= William S. Edmiston =

Canadian architect (1857–1903)

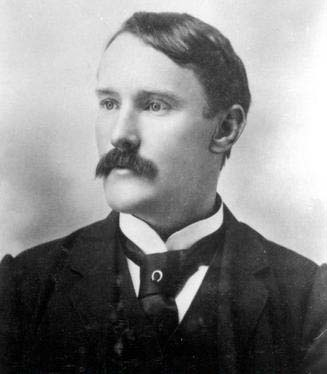

5th Mayor of Edmonton
- In office December 13, 1897 – December 11, 1899
- Preceded by: John Alexander McDougall
- Succeeded by: Kenneth W. MacKenzie

Alderman on the Edmonton Town Council
- In office January 14, 1895 – December 14, 1896

Personal details
- Born: November 10, 1857 Glasgow, Scotland
- Died: July 24, 1903 (aged 45) Edmonton, District of Alberta, North-West Territory, Canada
- Spouse: Georgina E. Edmiston
- Occupation: Architect

William Somerville Edmiston (November 10, 1857 – July 24, 1903) was an architect and politician in present-day Alberta, Canada. He was a member of the Edmonton Town Council and for two terms, the mayor of Edmonton.

Originally a native of Scotland, Edmiston came to Canada to settle in Clover Bar, Northwest Territories in the early 1880s. After living there for about ten years, he relocated to nearby Edmonton where he would employ himself as an architect, the first ever in the town. Engaging in a partnership with another fellow architect, his firm would design some of the first buildings in the newly developing town. He would also involve himself with the town's politics, sitting on the Edmonton Town Council, and later serving out two terms as Mayor of Edmonton, from 1897 to 1899. During his time as mayor, he involved himself in local affairs as well as run his architectural business. He would also lobby for a new bridge to be built over the North Saskatchewan River, connecting Edmonton with the town of Strathcona. He would voluntarily relinquish his position as mayor and not run in the 1899 election, opting to retire.

Edmiston was also very active in the sporting affairs of Edmonton, participating in and managing many sporting activities and clubs. He died after an accident which resulted in heart failure in 1903; an industrial park in Edmonton was subsequently named after him.

== Early life ==
Edmiston was born in 1857 at the Hutchesontown section of Glasgow, Scotland, the son of William Thomson and Jessie (née Mitchell) Edmiston. He immigrated to Canada in 1882, and settled in Clover Bar, Northwest Territories where he farmed. His siblings, Janet Hamilton Edmiston and Herbert William Edmiston had also immigrated to Canada. In Clover Bar, he was named justice of the peace, and served as a trustee in the local school board.

== Career ==
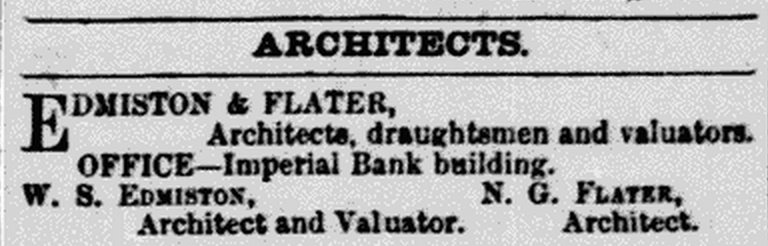
Advertisement for Edmiston & Flater, 1893

He relocated to the town of Edmonton in 1892, becoming the town's first architect. He also operated a brickyard upon settling. In 1892, Edmiston, working independently at the time, was contracted by the Edmonton Town Council to draft a map of the town. In that same year, he was also a member of a committee tasked with a project to establish a brewery in Edmonton. In 1893, he established a partnership with local architect Nathaniel G. Flater, and operated under the name Edmiston & Flater, headquartered at the Edmonton Imperial Bank Building. The firm designed many notable buildings for the town, including the first post office, the city's first brick school (for the Edmonton Public School District), the All Saints' Anglican Cathedral, a home for Herbert Charles Wilson, the McDougall & Secord retail store, and a fire hall. In 1899, he would end his partnership with Flater and enter into a new one, with Henry D. Johnson of Calgary, under the firm name Edmiston & Johnson Architects, Draughtsmen, Valuators and Insurance Agents. This firm was responsible for constructing, amongst many, a hospital building, a new Presbyterian church and making alterations to the Robertson Hall Theatre.

In 1900, an article was published in the Edmonton Bulletin, praising the firm Edmiston & Johnson, specifically for their "skill and artistic tastes", stating that they had "built for themselves a reputation that is second to none in their line".

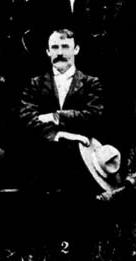
Edmiston in 1897, in the Diamond Jubilee planning committee group photo

William Edmiston was also briefly involved in the meat industry, establishing a pork packing business, the Edmonton Pork Packing Company, around 1896. During the 1890s he was also a director of the Edmonton District Railway Company.

=== Civic politics ===
In 1895, Edmiston was nominated for and subsequently elected to Edmonton Town Council, finishing first in the aldermanic race in a field of nine candidates, with 175 votes. He was re-elected in 1896, finishing second of eight candidates. During this term, Edmiston sat as the chair of the board of works. He also sat on the council's finance, public works and market committees. He did not seek re-election in the next election. In early 1897, he was a member of a planning committee for Queen Victoria's Diamond Jubilee celebrations within the town. In the ensuing December 1897 election, having been nominated for mayor by Colin Strang and George Roy, he was the only candidate put forth for the position, and thus was acclaimed to the position. In 1898, in response to getting nominated for re-election as mayor, Edmiston responded by purchasing an advertisement in the Edmonton Bulletin, stating:

As I have been requested by a large number of taxpayers to run for Mayor for 1899, I thank them for the honor and beg to say I have much pleasure and pride in accepting the nomination.

— Will S. Edmiston

He would be re-elected in the election later that year, defeating former mayor Cornelius Gallagher by 81 votes. He did not seek re-election in 1899, opting to retire. Following his last council meeting, after thanking members of the council, he treated members of the council and press members to "an excellent oyster supper" at a dining hall. During his two terms as mayor, he was involved in petitioning the dominion government for the bridge that became the Low Level Bridge, which would be constructed shortly after his final mayoral term, in 1900. He also introduced bylaws that permitted a new flour mill to operate with reduced taxation rates, authorized the widening of Queen Street, and provided for the purchase of additional property for the expansion of the town.

In May 1900, Edmiston, along with notables Alex Taylor, John Alexander McDougall, James McDonald, William Johnston Walker, Robert Manson, Thomas Bellamy, Herman McInnes, and Hedley C. Taylor, were named to The Edmonton Public Hospital corporate governing board, on the advice of the Legislative Assembly of the North-West Territories.

== Personal life ==
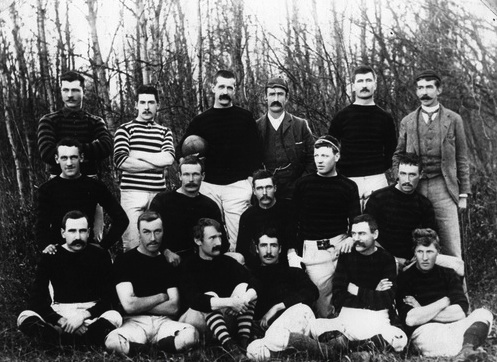
Edmonton Football Club in 1892, Edmiston is in the front row, third left

William Edmiston was a Mason and a member of the Old Timers' Association, the Sons of Scotland, Knights of Pythias, Edmonton Liberal-Conservative Association and Edmonton Board of Trade. Edmiston was active in the sporting community of Edmonton, serving on football and rugby committees in the 1890s, the honorary president of the Victoria Football Club, and as a member of the local hockey, curling and rifleman's clubs. He also played on a local cricket team in the 1890s and in local billiard tournaments. He resided in the Riverdale neighbourhood of Edmonton, where former mayor Matthew McCauley had also lived. At the time of the 1901 Census of Canada, Edmiston was living in Edmonton with his wife, Georgina Edmiston (born in New Brunswick), sister Janet Edmiston, and his two children, Kenneth William and Jessie Gertrude Edmiston. His son, Kenneth would serve in World War I with the 19th Alberta Dragoons.

== Death and legacy ==
Edmiston died suddenly of heart failure July 24, 1903, at his Cliffe Street home in Edmonton. He was 45 years old. He had been recovering from an accident suffered a week prior in which he sustained a broken leg. After his funeral on July 26, 1903, he was buried at the Edmonton Cemetery. His obituary lauded that he was a well-respected citizen who had "always taken a prominent part in all matters pertaining to the welfare of [Edmonton]."

Edmiston Industrial, an industrial park located in the Northwest portion of the Edmonton near the Yellowhead Trail, was named in his honour in 1975. The architectural firm of Edmiston & Johnson lasted up until the 1960s, changing partners multiple times, and ultimately folding in 1964 under the name Howard and Robert Bouey Architects.
