= January 1896 Edmonton municipal election =

Municipal election in Canada

The first of two 1896 municipal elections was held January 13, 1896 to elect the town council (consisting of a mayor and six aldermen, each elected for a one-year term), five trustees for the public school division and four trustees for the separate school division.

== Voter turnout ==
Voter turnout figures for the January 1896 municipal election are no longer available.

== Results ==
(bold indicates elected, italics indicate incumbent)

=== Mayor ===
Herbert Charles Wilson was acclaimed for a second term.

=== Aldermen ===
- **Matthew McCauley** - 144
- **William S. Edmiston** - 142
- **Thomas Bellamy** - 136
- **Isaac Cowie** - 127
- **Charles Sutter** - 116
- **John Kelly** - 103
- Joseph Henri Picard - 98
- Colin Strang - 75

=== Public school trustees ===
Thomas Bellamy, John Cameron, J McBride, Matthew McCauley, and Frank Oliver were elected. Detailed results are no longer available.

=== Separate (Catholic) school trustees ===
N D Beck, Sandy Larue, Antonio Prince, and Georges Roy were elected. Detailed results are no longer available.
