= 1895 Edmonton municipal election =

Municipal election in Alberta, Canada

The 1895 Edmonton municipal election was held on January 14, 1895 in Edmonton, Alberta to elect the town council (consisting of a mayor and six aldermen, each elected for a one-year term) and four trustees for each of the public and separate school divisions. This was the first election in Edmonton history in which there was a contested race for mayor, and also the first during which school trustee elections were held concurrently with those for town council.

Wilson, the successful mayoral candidate, was an opponent of Matthew McCauley and although he won against McDougall (McDougall was put up as a last-minute candidate by council members who supported McCauley, even though they expected Wilson to win), the majority of the elected town council were McCauley supporters.

== Voter turnout ==
Voter turnout figures for the 1895 municipal election are no longer available.

== Results ==
(bold indicates elected, italics indicate incumbent)

=== Mayor ===
| Candidate | Votes | % |
|---|---|---|
| **Herbert Charles Wilson** | **129** | **58.64%** |
| John Alexander McDougall | 91 | 41.36% |

=== Aldermen ===
| Candidate | Votes |
|---|---|
| **William S. Edmiston** | **175** |
| **John Kelly** | **120** |
| **Colin Strang** | **119** |
| **John Cameron** | **114** |
| **Thomas Bellamy** | **111** |
| **Joseph Henri Picard** | **110** |
| Charles Sutter | 108 |
| George Hutton | 105 |
| A. D. Osborne | 68 |

=== Public school trustees ===
| Candidate | Votes |
|---|---|
| **Matthew McCauley** | **103** |
| **John Cameron** | **99** |
| **Thomas Bellamy** | **93** |
| **James Lauder** | **87** |
| George Sanderson | 82 |
| John Alexander McDougall | 79 |
| Henry Goodridge | 73 |

=== St. Joachim Separate School District ===
| Candidate | Votes |
|---|---|
| **N. D. Beck** | **Acclaimed** |
| **J. G. Fairbanks** | **Acclaimed** |
| **John Kelly** | **Acclaimed** |
| **Sandy Larue** | **Acclaimed** |
