= Cornelius Gallagher =

Cornelius Gallagher may refer to:

- Cornelius Gallagher (American politician) (1921–2018), U.S. Representative from New Jersey
- Cornelius Gallagher (Canadian politician) (1854–1932), politician in Alberta, Canada, mayor of Edmonton
