= Charles Sutter =

Canadian politician (1856–1922)

Charles William Sutter
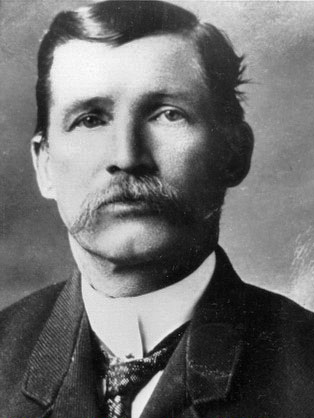

Alderman on the Edmonton Town Council
- In office January 2, 1894 – January 14, 1895
- In office January 13, 1896 – December 14, 1896

Personal details
- Born: November 19, 1856 Toronto, Canada West
- Died: August 23, 1922 (aged 65) Edmonton, Alberta
- Spouse: Mary Stewart (2 children)
- Profession: Tailor

Charles William Sutter (November 19, 1856 – August 23, 1922) was a politician in Alberta, Canada and a municipal councillor in Edmonton.

== Biography ==
Sutter was born in Toronto. As a child, his family moved to Perth County where his father died in 1867. Sutter worked on the family's farm for three years, and then was apprenticed as a tailor in Toronto for another four. In 1875, he moved to Winnipeg to work for the city's leading merchants, Higgins & Young.

In 1879, Sutter set out by foot for Edmonton with James Ross, one horse, and a Red River ox cart, arriving 76 days later. He became a partner in John Sinclair & Co. in the dry goods and grocery business until it dissolved in 1885. Sutter returned to Winnipeg and worked as a tailor for four years before returning again to Edmonton in 1891 to continue this work.

In 1885, he married Mary Stewart (sometimes spelled Stuart). They had two children.

He ran for Edmonton Town Council in 1894, finishing fifth of nine candidates in the race for alderman; he was one of six candidates elected. He was defeated in his bid for re-election in 1895, but did return to office in 1896, finishing fifth of eight candidates. He did not seek election at the conclusion of this term, and did not re-enter political life.

In 1896 he was appointed immigration agent, a position he filled in Edmonton for 12 years before being transferred to the United States where he remained until just before his death. Sutter was the President of the Old Timers' Club of Edmonton, organized Edmonton's first group of Masons, and was active with groups including the Order of Oddfellows, the United Workmen, and the Knights of Pythias.
