= 1892 Edmonton municipal election =

Municipal election in Canada

Matthew McCauley, who was acclaimed as mayor in the 1892 election
Colin Strang	Daniel Fraser
Edward Carey	James Goodridge
John Cameron	Philip Daly

The 1892 Edmonton municipal election, held February 10, 1892, was the first after the incorporation of Edmonton as a town in the North-West Territories on January 9, 1892, and was held to elect the new town's first town council (consisting of a mayor and six aldermen) for a one-year term. Matthew McCauley was acclaimed as Edmonton's first mayor, Voters elected six aldermen -Colin Strang, Daniel Fraser, Edward Carey, James Goodridge, John Cameron, and Philip Daly - from a field of fourteen candidates.

== Background ==
In 1891, the Canadian Pacific Railway's main line, which had passed across the prairies well south of Edmonton, grew a branch-line running north from Calgary, into Strathcona, then known as South Edmonton. Edmonton came to fear that the presence of the railway across the North Saskatchewan River would result in it being surpassed by its southern neighbour. Calls for a railway to be brought into Edmonton grew louder (this objective would be achieved in 1905). As part of these efforts, it was judged appropriate to apply for a town charter. The NWT government passed the incorporation bill on Dec. 29, 1891, to be effective Jan. 9, 1892. Incorporation came into practical effect after an elected town council assumed its responsibilities, upon being sworn into office on February 15, 1892.

The election of the first Edmonton town council was conducted on February 10.

== Candidates ==
Nomination day was February 3, one week before the election, and nominations were accepted between ten am and noon. All nominated candidates ran as independents, as political parties did not begin to make their appearance until after Edmonton was incorporated as a city in 1904.

=== Mayoral nominations ===
Matthew McCauley was nominated by George Sanderson and Colin Strang and was the only mayoral candidate nominated. As such, he was declared elected by acclamation.

=== Aldermanic nominations ===
Although there would eventually be fourteen candidates contesting the election, on nomination day there were seventeen nominated.

Candidate	Nominated By	
A. F. DeGagne	A. D. Osborne, John Kelly	Accepted
J. Knowles	John Kelly, T. H. Stewart, Thomas Henderson	Accepted
Kenneth McLeod	Thomas Henderson, John Kelly	Accepted, but withdrew just after the poll opened
George Sanderson	Thomas Henderson, S. S. Taylor	Accepted
James McDonald	W. S. Robertson, S. S. Taylor	Accepted
E. Rayner	M. S. Connor, J. G. Lauder, J. R. Michael	Declined
John Alexander McDougall	W. Fielders, S. S. Taylor	Accepted
Edward Carey	John Alexander McDougall, W. Fielders	Accepted
Colin Strang	W. Fielders, S. S. Taylor	Accepted
James Goodridge	Colin Strang, Edward Loopy	Accepted
John Cameron	Colin Strang, W. Johnstone Walker	Accepted
John Kelly	W. S. Robertson, Joseph Henri Picard	Accepted
Donald Ross	Alexander Taylor, J. G. Lauder	Accepted
Philip Daly	James Ross, E. Rayner, James McKernan	Accepted
James Ross	Robert Vance, W. McKay, Philip Daly, A. D. Osborne, Kenneth McLeod, John Kelly	Accepted
Daniel Fraser	W. S. Robertson, Charles Sanderson	Accepted
George Thompson	A. H. Goodwin, M. S. Connor, R. F. Shaw, T. G. Lauder, E. E. Rayner	Declined

== Issues ==
As Edmonton had yet to be incorporated at the time of election, most questions facing any municipality would have to be addressed in some form by the new council. The Edmonton Bulletin, in a February 6 editorial, listed several that it thought that candidates should be addressing:

- the level of taxation
- whether to incur liabilities for public purposes or to "live within our means"
- whether to implement some system of fire protection, or whether the substantial space between most of the town's buildings was sufficient protection itself against fire
- whether to levy taxes by a straight property tax, or whether to implement other taxes (such as dog taxes, drag taxes, boarding house taxes, poll taxes, etc.)
- how many municipal liquor licenses to issue
- what scheme of police protection to adopt
- how to establish productive industries

Additionally, in a February 13 editorial the Bulletin reminded the new council that the major purpose of incorporation had been to either construct a railroad bridge across the North Saskatchewan River or, in the event that Canadian Pacific Railway was not amenable to the idea, construct a traffic bridge to lead to the train station in South Edmonton.

== Campaign ==
=== Candidate activity ===
The campaign was a lacklustre one; the Bulletin claimed on February 6 that only Philip Daly had even bothered to release his policies and called upon the candidates to organize a public meeting on one of the campaign's last days. Several of the aldermanic candidates - Strang, Goodridge, Daly, and Fraser - made campaign speeches at the nomination meeting, but these were brief and promised only that the candidate would serve the town to the best of his ability if elected. On election day itself, the Bulletin reported "light canvassing" by several of the candidates, and none at all by others.

=== Endorsements ===
The Edmonton Bulletin, the town's only paper, did not make any specific endorsements. However, it did advise voters that

in municipal matters the only money handled comes directly sooner or later from the pockets of the individual ratepayers and therefore that a man who is liable for a large amount of taxes is more apt to be careful of expenditure than one whose taxes are not as important an item to him.

== The election ==
=== Voter turnout ===
Eligibility to vote in the election was restricted to "men, unmarried women and widows, being British subjects over 21 years of age, who have been owners or householders within the municipality for a period of not less than three months next preceding the day of voting". Of these, 234 cast ballots (although five of these were spoiled) out of an estimated eligible voter base of 200. Elections officials attributed this to an "unexpected population spurt".

=== Election staff ===
The election was overseen by Returning Officer A. G. Randall, who was assisted by Deputy Returning Officer E. J. Bangs, Election Clerk J. C. F. Brown, Poll Clerk J. R. Michael, and Constable F. Shaw (who provided a mounted police patrol at the poll through election day).

== Results ==
(bold indicates elected, italics indicate incumbent)

=== Mayor ===
Candidate	Votes	%
**Matthew McCauley**	**Acclaimed**	

=== Aldermen ===
All six of Edmonton's aldermen were elected in 1892, through Plurality block voting with each voter being able to cast as many as six votes. In total, 1111 votes were cast by the 234 who voted.

Candidate	Votes
**Colin Strang**	**134**
**Daniel Fraser**	**128**
**Edward Carey**	**124**
**James Goodridge**	**117**
**John Cameron**	**113**
**Philip Daly**	**107**
John Alexander McDougall	91
A. F. DeGagne	88
George Sanderson	88
Donald Ross	67
John Kelly	60
James Ross	55
James McDonald	37
J. Knowles	15

== Reaction ==
After McCauley's acclamation, the Bulletin commented that this event, "while, no doubt, very pleasing to gentleman, is not less satisfactory to the large majority of the ratepayers of the town" and praised the new mayor as a man of "energy and good judgment that, shown in lesser offices in the past, has won for him the public confidence."

Only a few months later, Mayor McCauley would lead a mob of Edmontonians in disrupting the operation of a federal office, in the "Rat Creek Rebellion."
