= Cornelius Gallagher (Canadian politician) =

Canadian politician

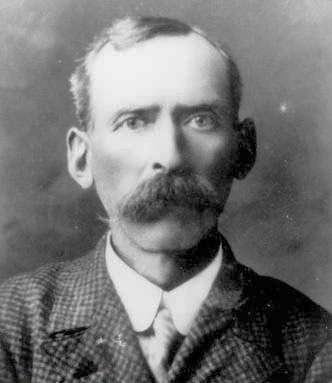
- Cornelius Gallagher circa 1905 as a member of the Edmonton Old Timers' Association

3rd Mayor of Edmonton
- In office October 27, 1896 – December 14, 1896
- Preceded by: Herbert Charles Wilson
- Succeeded by: John Alexander McDougall

Alderman on the Edmonton Town Council
- In office January 13, 1893 – January 14, 1895
- In office December 14, 1896 – December 13, 1897
- In office December 9, 1901 – December 14, 1903

Personal details
- Born: December 31, 1854 Saint John, New Brunswick, British North America
- Died: October 27, 1932 (aged 77) Edmonton, Alberta, Canada
- Spouse: Exilda Bourre (m. 1888)
- Children: 2 adopted children
- Profession: Butcher

Cornelius Gallagher (December 31, 1854 – October 27, 1932) was a Canadian meat merchant and politician in Alberta. He served as a municipal councillor and briefly as the third mayor of Edmonton.

Gallagher was born in New Brunswick in 1854, the son of an Irish immigrant father. After attending the schools of his birthplace, he moved west to Winnipeg with his family, and became involved in the family meat packing business, established by his father. He would soon move west again to what would later become the province of Saskatchewan, where he would continue his business, providing his product to the local police establishments and soldiers during the North-West Rebellion. After his contracts expired there, Gallagher would move again further west, to Edmonton, where he would permanently settle.

In Edmonton he established the developing town's largest meat packing business, upon land atop the banks of the North Saskatchewan River, overlooking the river valley. He would also get involved with the city's local politics, sitting on the Edmonton Town Council in the 1890s and early 1900s. In 1896, after the incumbent mayor had resigned, the town council selected Gallagher to briefly be the interim mayor until an election was held later that year. He served one more aldermanic term, but retired after defeat in the 1903 and 1907 elections. In 1911, he would also retire from his meat business. In retirement, Gallagher lived on a lavish estate on land he owned atop the Edmonton River Valley until his death in 1932.

== Early life and career ==
Gallagher was born on December 31, 1854, in Saint John, New Brunswick to Patrick and Katherine (née Maher) Gallagher. His father, Patrick came to Canada from Ireland at the age of 14, and worked in the meat industry, being a wholesale meat merchant and meat packer. His mother was a native of Saint John. Cornelius Gallagher would attend schooling during the 1870s in his hometown; later joining his father in his meat business. When his father relocated to Winnipeg in 1877, he established a wholesale and retail meat distribution business, P. Gallagher and Son, which Cornelius and his brother, Edward would work in. Cornelius Gallagher in 1888 moved to Battleford, North-West Territory (today in Saskatchewan) in 1888, where he bought out his father's firm's interests. There, he was on a contract to supply troops stationed in the aftermath of the suppression of the North-West Rebellion. In 1889, he moved south to Regina, where his business, Childs & Gallagher, supplied meat to the North-West Mounted Police. He remained there for two years, until 1891, when his contract with the Mounties expired.

== Career in Edmonton ==
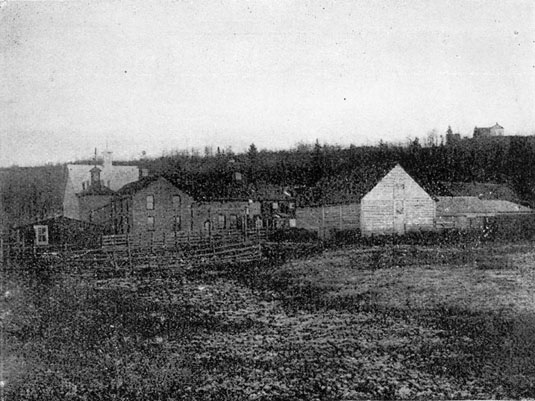
Gallagher-Hull meat processing plant in 1903

In 1891, Gallagher relocated, this time to Edmonton, also located in the then-Northwest Territories. He had been intrigued with the fact that majority of the territory's wheat and vegetable crops came from the Edmonton area, and scenting a business opportunity, decided to settle there. Purchasing a lot for his business less than 24 hours after arriving in Edmonton, Gallagher established with Calgary based businessman, William Roper Hull, the Gallagher-Hull Meat Company, a wholesale and retail butcher. Incorporated on January 6, 1900, the establishment was a two-storey brick building located on the banks of the North Saskatchewan River, from which the establishment relied on for its freshwater supply. It contained rooms for slaughtering the animals, storage, butchering and preparation of the meat. Offering a variety of different proteins, such as veal, beef, lamb, turkey, chicken, goose, and pork, the business rose to become the largest of its kind in the developing city of Edmonton, producing over 200,000 pounds (91,000 kg) of meat per year by the turn of the century. He would operate the establishment until his retirement in 1911. He also had interests in the brick industry, founding and serving as president of a local brick company.

=== Civic politics ===
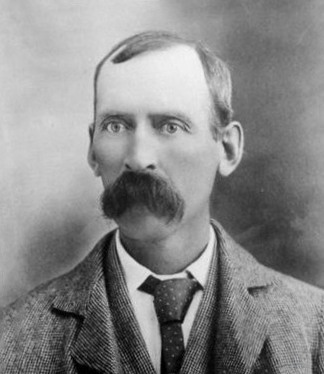
Gallagher as mayor of Edmonton in 1896

Gallagher first sought public office in 1893, when he was elected to Edmonton Town Council. In an aldermanic race in which the top six candidates were elected, he gained the final spot. On his first term on council he sat on the Licensing, and Health & Relief committees. He was re-elected in 1894, again placing sixth of nine candidates. Once this term expired in 1896, Gallagher stayed out of politics for several months until mayor Herbert Charles Wilson resigned over a dispute involving town funds. It fell to the council to fill the mayor's position. Gallagher was nominated by John Cameron and John Kelly; as there were no rival candidates, he won by acclamation. He was the first mayor of Edmonton never to be elected to that position; (Frederick John Mitchell and Terry Cavanagh would later join him in that distinction). He was sworn in at the town council meeting on October 27, 1896.

During his brief term as mayor, Gallagher oversaw the town during a time when many prospectors headed to the Klondike Gold Rush saw Edmonton as a stopover point. He also became the inaugural president of the Edmonton Hockey Club when it was founded on November 20, 1896.

In the ensuing election, Gallagher chose to run for alderman rather than seeking a full term as mayor. This remains the only time in the city's history that a sitting mayor has run for alderman. He was elected, placing fifth of nine candidates. During this term he sat on committees involved in issues relating to finance, police and utilities (fire, water and light). He did not seek re-election in the election in December 1897. In December 1898 Gallagher ran for mayor, but was defeated by William S. Edmiston. He stayed out of politics until 1901, when he was elected to a two-year term as alderman. He was defeated in his re-election bid in 1903, placing fifth of nine candidates (the staggered two year aldermanic terms meant that only three of the council's six aldermen were elected each election). His last bid for office took place during the 1907 election, when he placed eleventh of twelve candidates in the aldermanic race.

== Personal life ==
In Edmonton, Gallagher resided in a "grand house" at 9902 111 Street, overlooking Edmonton's river valley. He also owned land referred to as Gallagher's Flats, later renamed Cloverdale. In 1888, he married Exilda Bourre, and with her adopted two children, Mary and Marie. Avidly involved in community affairs, Gallagher was a member and president of both the Edmonton Board of Trade (1898) and Edmonton Exhibition Association. He was a member of the Conservative Party of Alberta and president of the Liberal-Conservative Association of Strathcona, and was of the Roman Catholic faith. He was also a member of the Swine Breeders' Association, Edmonton Club, and Old Timers' Association. Upon his retirement from his meat business, he embarked on a 6-month trip to South America with his wife.

=== Death and legacy ===
Gallagher died at Edmonton on October 27, 1932. He was 77 years old, and was buried at the Edmonton Roman Catholic Cemetery after his funeral at St. Joachim's Church, where he was a parishioner. He was survived by his wife, one daughter and seven siblings.

Known as one of the most prominent men in Western Canada, Gallagher was widely praised for his successful business career. The 1912 publication, History of the province of Alberta, states the following:

In view of success to which Cornelius Gallagher has attained, it is but just to enter somewhat in detail concerning the plans and methods he has followed and the characteristics which he has manifested in an industrial and commercial career marked by consecutive progress. His business connections from the beginning continually broadened in their scope and importance and force of character and well developed talents have made in a power in the field of commercial, industrial and financial activity. In business affairs he is energetic, prompt, and notably reliable, while his social qualities have rendered him very popular. Tireless energy, keen perception, honesty of purpose, a genius for devising and executing the right thing at the right time, joined every-day common sense, are his chief characteristics.

Gallagher Park (formerly named Grassy Hill), in the Cloverdale area in Edmonton is named in his honour. The park is known for hosting the annual Edmonton Folk Music Festival.

== Bibliography ==
- Aubrey, Merrily K. (2004), Naming Edmonton: From Ada to Zoie, Edmonton, Alberta: University of Alberta, ISBN 978-0-88864-423-7
- Legal, Emile Joseph (1914), Short sketches of the history of the Catholic churches and missions in central Alberta, Winnipeg, Manitoba: West Canada Publishing
- MacRae, Archibald Oswald (1912), History of the province of Alberta, vol. 2, Calgary, Alberta: Western Canada History Co
- Perry, Sandra E.; Footz, Valerie L. (2006), A Higher Duty : Speakers of the Legislative Assemblies of the North-West Territories and Alberta, 1888–2005, Edmonton, Alberta: Legislative Assembly of Alberta, ISBN 0-9689217-3-6
