= James Goodridge =

Canadian politician (1852–1900)

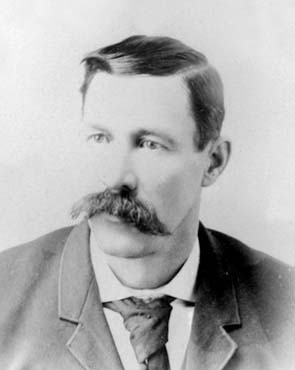

Alderman on the Edmonton Town Council
- In office February 10, 1892 – January 2, 1894

Personal details
- Born: 1852 Vaughan, Canada West
- Died: March 13, 1900 (aged 48) Edmonton, Alberta
- Profession: Hotelier

James Goodridge (1852 – March 13, 1900) was a politician in Alberta, Canada and a municipal councillor in Edmonton.

== Biography ==
Goodridge was born in 1852 in Vaughan, Canada West. He later moved to Winnipeg before coming west to Edmonton by ox-train in 1882. Once in Edmonton, he went into business as a boarding house-operator before building Jasper House, Edmonton's first brick hotel, the same year. Jasper House, which was eventually renovated into the Hub Hotel, also served as Goodridge's home.

He was elected to Edmonton's first town council in 1892, finishing fourth of fourteen candidates in the aldermanic race (the top six candidates were elected). He was re-elected in 1893, finishing fourth of nine candidates but was defeated in 1894, finishing seventh of nine candidates.

Goodridge continued to operate the Hub hotel until his death in 1900.
