= 1899 Edmonton municipal election =

Municipal election in Canada

The 1899 municipal election was held December 11, 1899. It was the first municipal election in which only a portion of the aldermen were to be elected; in 1898, three of the six aldermen elected were elected to two-year terms in preparation for a system in which only half of the aldermen would be up for election each year. Kenneth McLeod, Alfred Jackson, and Kenneth W. MacKenzie were all only halfway through their two-year terms at the time of the election. However, MacKenzie resigned in order to become mayor, leaving council with four vacancies. Only three were filled by the election; council appointed Henry Goodridge to fill the fourth seat until the 1900 election.

== Voter turnout ==
221 ballots were cast out of 613 eligible voters, for a turnout of 36.0%.

== Results ==
(bold indicates elected, italics indicate incumbent)

=== Mayor ===
Kenneth W. MacKenzie was acclaimed as mayor.

=== Aldermen ===
- **Robert Lee** - 156
- **Colin Strang** - 147
- **Alfred Brown** - 124

Information about defeated candidates for this election is no longer available.

=== Public school trustees ===
Matthew McCauley, William Short, Colin Strang, Alex Taylor, and Hedley C. Taylor were elected. Detailed results are no longer available.

=== Separate (Catholic) school trustees ===
Nicolas Dubois Dominic Beck, Joseph Henri Picard, Antonio Prince, and Georges Roy were elected. Detailed results are no longer available.
