= John Alexander McDougall =

Canadian politician

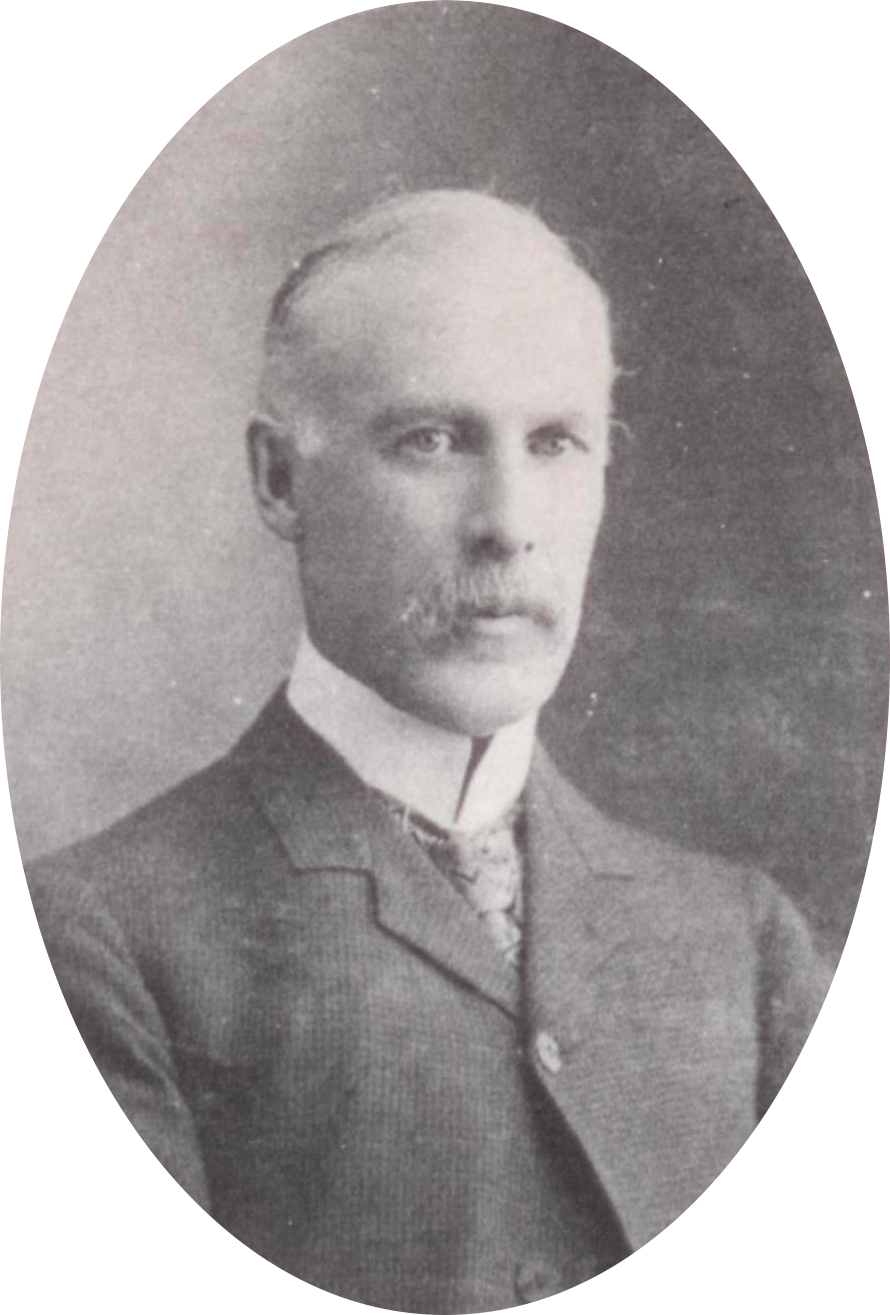

4th Mayor of Edmonton
- In office December 14, 1896 – December 13, 1897
- Preceded by: Cornelius Gallagher
- Succeeded by: William S. Edmiston
- In office December 9, 1907 – December 14, 1908
- Preceded by: William Antrobus Griesbach
- Succeeded by: Robert Lee

Member of the Legislative Assembly of Alberta for Edmonton
- In office March 23, 1909 – April 17, 1913
- Preceded by: Charles Wilson Cross
- Succeeded by: Charles Wilson Cross, Albert Ewing

Alderman on the Edmonton Town Council
- In office January 13, 1893 – January 14, 1895

Personal details
- Born: May 20, 1854 Oakwood, Canada West
- Died: December 17, 1928 (aged 74) Edmonton, Alberta
- Spouse: Lovisa Jane Amey (6 children)
- Parent(s): Alexander J. McDougall and Janet Cummings
- Profession: Merchant

John Alexander McDougall (May 20, 1854 – December 17, 1928) was a businessman and politician in Alberta, Canada, He served as a municipal councillor, mayor and a member of the Legislative Assembly of Alberta.

== Early life ==
John Alexander McDougall was born May 20, 1854, in Oakwood, Canada West (now Ontario) to Alexander J. McDougall and Janet Cummings. His father died in 1867 when John was thirteen. He left school and worked to support his family.

In 1873, he moved to Fort Garry (now Winnipeg) where he worked as a fur trader and completed his education at Manitoba College. In 1877 this work brought him to Edmonton, where he decided to settle, but not before returning to Ontario in 1878 to marry his high school sweetheart, Lovisa Jane Amey (1878-1943), with whom he had three sons and three daughters. The pair settled in Edmonton in 1879, where McDougall went into business, trading furs in competition with the Hudson's Bay Company, soon opening a general store.

In 1881, he was one of ten Edmontonians to guarantee the five hundred dollar annual salary of the settlement's first schoolteacher.

He became a justice of the peace in 1885.

== Business career ==
McDougall ran a general store in Edmonton starting in 1879. He specialized in buying and selling furs.

John McDougall was the first president of the Edmonton Board of Trade, in 1889.

In 1896, McDougall joined with fellow Edmonton pioneer businessman Richard Secord and founded McDougall & Secord. This business advertised itself as "general merchants, wholesale and retail; buyers and exporters of raw furs; dealers in land scrip and north west lands; outfitters for survey parties, traders, trappers, miners and others for the north, and suppliers for country stores." The two ran the company until 1907, when they sold it.

Besides the fur trade, McDougall & Secord did a major business in buying Metis scrip and re-selling them at a profit. Sometimes a scrip, a mere scrap paper, could be obtained for a bottle of whiskey, then could be used to obtain 160 acres of choice farmland, which then sold for $2 an acre. Alleged schemes that Secord used to secure scrip at that time are described in Rob Houle's research "Richard Henry Secord and Metis Scrip Speculation" (June 2016), available on-line.

With this business and their other lines, McDougall and Secord became millionaires by the time Alberta became a province in 1905.

In 1907, the two formed a financial house and mortgage corporation called McDougall & Secord, Limited. McDougall operated this company until his death, when its leadership was taken over by his son John Charles McDougall. It has now been closed permanently.

== Political career ==
In 1892, McDougall ran for alderman of Edmonton's first town council. He was narrowly defeated, finishing seventh place (16 votes behind sixth place Philip Daly) out of fourteen candidates in an election in which the top six candidates were elected.

He ran again in 1893, received the most votes among the nine candidates, and was among the six elected.

He was re-elected in 1894. He replaced second of nine candidates, behind Colin Strang). He was elected to the public school board the same year (he served one year).

In 1895 McDougall ran for mayor against Herbert Charles Wilson, but was defeated, 129 votes to 91.

He en for mayor again in 1896 and was elected. He did not seek re-election in 1897, and stayed out of politics for the next decade.

In 1907 McDougall was again elected mayor, defeating Joseph Henri Picard 1217 votes to 437. During this term as mayor, he installed an automatic telephone system in the city and oversaw the establishment of a street railway (streetcar) system for Edmonton and Strathcona. He did not seek re-election in 1908.

Running as a Liberal candidate in 1909, he was elected as one of the two Members of the Legislative Assembly in the Edmonton district. He did not seek re-election in 1913, when he was 59 years of age. Instead he devoted his energies to his business activities, the Edmonton economy being in recession at that time.

== Last years and legacy ==
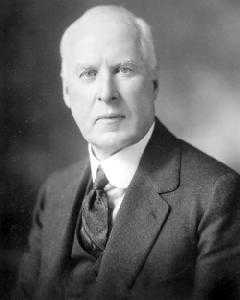
McDougall in his later years.

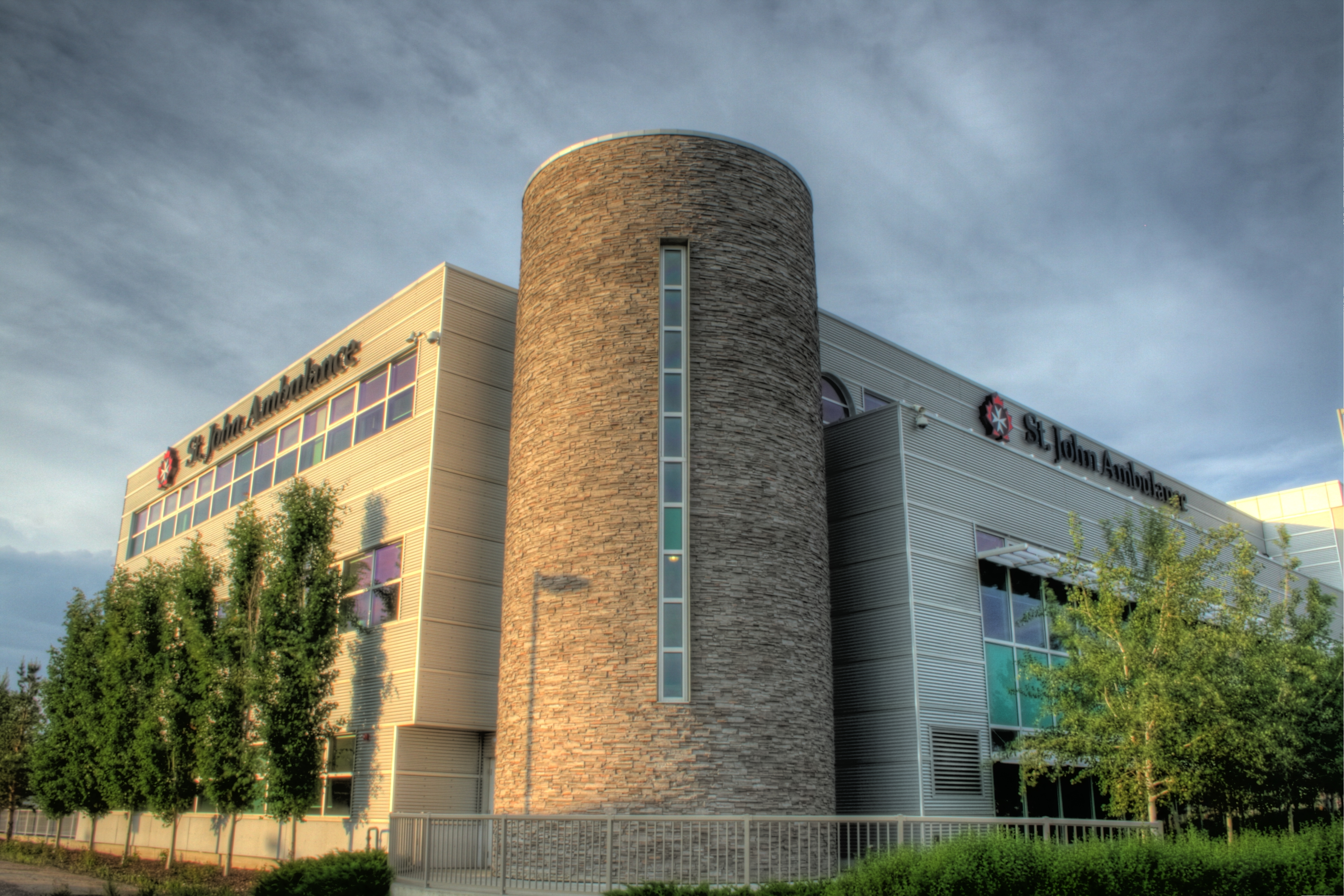
St John Ambulance building in Edmonton

McDougall spent many of his last years traveling the world with his wife. He died in Edmonton on December 17, 1928. He had been active with the Presbyterian Church, the Masonic Order and the Edmonton Club.

McDougall was one of the founders of St. John Ambulance in Alberta.

John A. McDougall School is named in his honour.

McDougall & Secord, Limited exists in Edmonton to this day, believed to be the oldest surviving company in Alberta. Its precursors—McDougall's General Store and Secord's Fur Store and Warehouse—are reproduced on 1885 Street in Fort Edmonton Park.

James G. MacGregor was author of his biography, Edmonton Trader, The Story of John A. McDougall.

== Footnotes ==
Political offices
Preceded by Cornelius Gallagher	Mayor of Edmonton; 1896–1897	Succeeded by William S. Edmiston
Preceded by William Antrobus Griesbach	Mayor of Edmonton; 1907–1908	Succeeded by Robert Lee
Legislative Assembly of Alberta
Preceded by Charles Wilson Cross	MLA Edmonton; 1909–1913	Succeeded by Charles Wilson Cross; Albert Ewing
