= Kenneth W. MacKenzie =

Canadian politician (1862–1929)

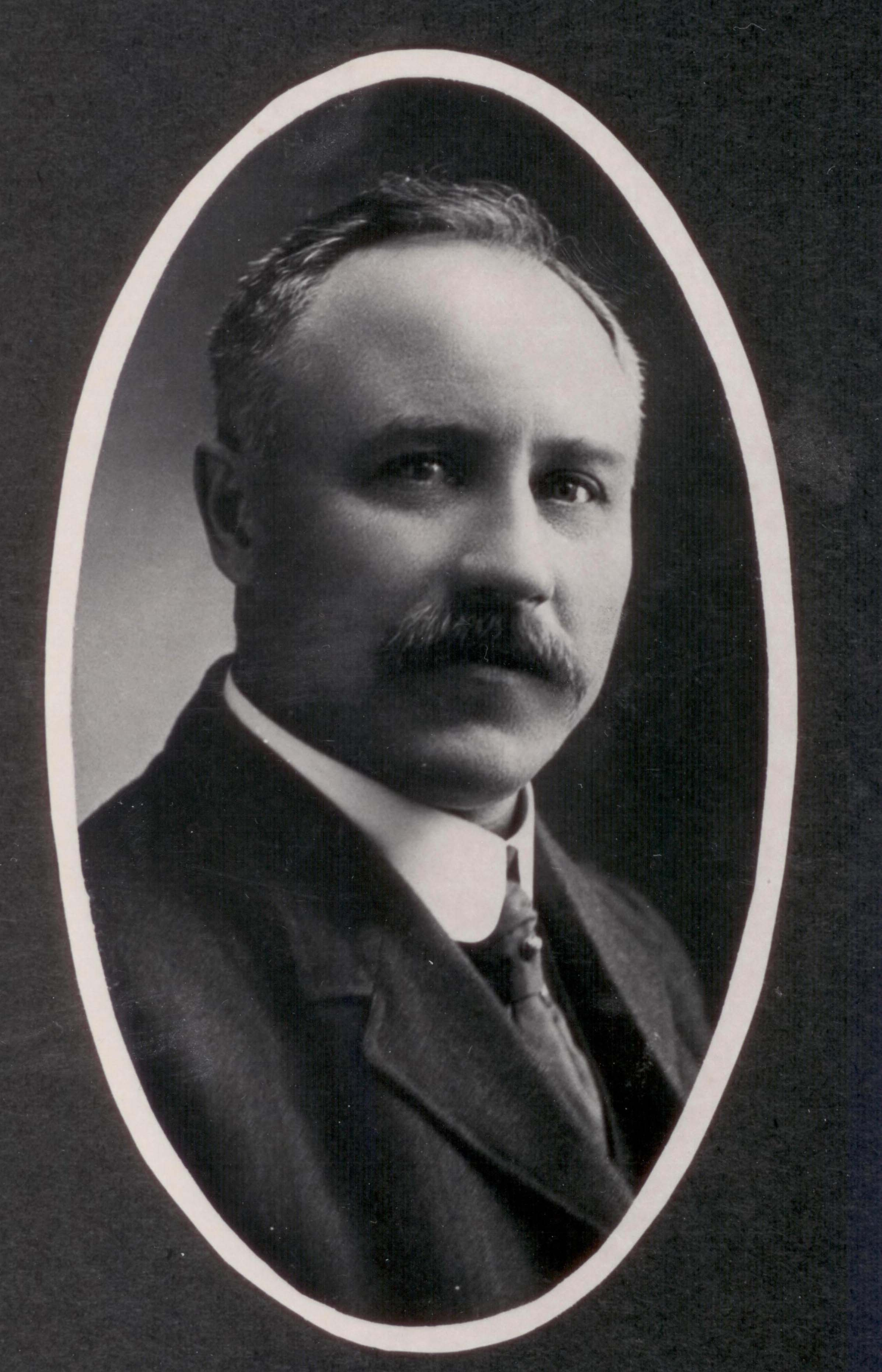

6th Mayor of Edmonton
- In office December 11, 1899 – December 9, 1901
- Preceded by: William S. Edmiston
- Succeeded by: William Short
- In office December 12, 1904 – December 11, 1905
- Preceded by: William Short
- Succeeded by: Charles May

Alderman on the Edmonton Town Council
- In office December 12, 1898 – December 11, 1899

Personal details
- Born: February 3, 1862 Lucknow, Canada West
- Died: October 9, 1929 (aged 67) Edmonton, Alberta
- Education: University of Toronto
- Profession: Teacher

Kenneth W. MacKenzie (February 3, 1862 – October 9, 1929) was a politician in Alberta, Canada and a two-time mayor of Edmonton.

== Biography ==
MacKenzie was born on a farm near Lucknow, Canada West on February 3, 1862. He left school during his early teens, but completed his schooling after losing the use of his left hand in an accident in 1883. He graduated from the University of Toronto with a Bachelor of Arts in 1893.

That same year, he moved to Lethbridge, Alberta, North-West Territories, where he spent two years as a school principal for two years before moving to Edmonton, Alberta in 1895. In Edmonton, he became principal of College Avenue High School, in which capacity he served until 1898 when he resigned to pursue a career as a bookseller and stationer.

In the 1898 election, MacKenzie was elected to Edmonton Town Council as an alderman. His term was for two years, but in 1899 he resigned from his position as alderman to run for mayor. He was acclaimed, and also faced no opposition to his 1900 re-election bid. At the conclusion of his term, he stayed out of municipal politics until the 1904 election, in which he was acclaimed to the office of mayor for a third time. This made him the first mayor of the city of Edmonton, which was incorporated in 1904 (Edmonton had hitherto been a town).

After this, his last term as mayor, expired, MacKenzie became land agent for the Government of Canada, in which capacity he served until 1913. His only return to electoral politics occurred in 1912, when he was elected to the public school board (finishing first of seven candidates). He served until the expiration of his two-year term, but did not seek re-election.

In 1913, MacKenzie returned to teaching as a math teacher at Victoria High School until his death. He also served on the Hospital Board, was president of the Edmonton Board of Trade in 1903, and was president of the Associated Boards of Trade of Western Canada in 1908.

Kenneth MacKenzie died of a cerebral hemorrhage on October 9, 1929. He was survived by his wife, one son, and two daughters.

Preceded by William S. Edmiston	Mayor of Edmonton; 1899–1901	Succeeded by William Short
Preceded by William Short	Mayor of Edmonton; 1904–1905	Succeeded by Charles May
