= Philip Daly =

Canadian politician (1860–1923)

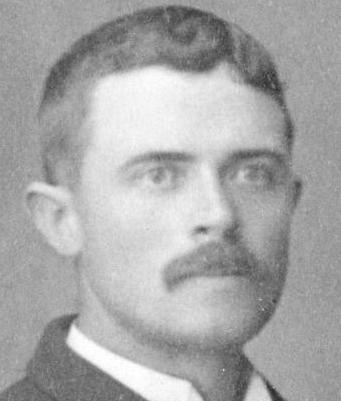

Alderman on the Edmonton Town Council
- In office February 10, 1892 – January 13, 1893

Personal details
- Born: December 1860 Neenah, Wisconsin, United States
- Died: January 22, 1923 (aged 62) Sebastian County, Arkansas
- Spouse: Lizzie
- Profession: Businessman, Pharmacist, Banker

Philip Ernest Daly (December 1860 – January 22, 1923) was a politician in Alberta, Canada and a municipal councillor in Edmonton.

== Biography ==
Philip Ernest Daly was born in Neenah, Wisconsin in December 1860 to Charles B. Daly, from Kingston, Canada West. As a young adult, he was employed with the Merchant's bank in Belleville and Woodstock, Ontario. He came to Edmonton from Winnipeg in 1886 and bought a pharmacy from Herbert Charles Wilson, which he operated, along with a bank, until 1890, after which he went into the flour and feed business.

He was elected to Edmonton's first town council in 1892, finishing sixth of fourteen candidates in an election in which the top six candidates were elected alderman. He did not seek re-election in 1893.

He died in Sebastian County, Arkansas on January 22, 1923.
