= 1894 Edmonton municipal election =

Municipal election in Canada

The 1894 Edmonton municipal election was held January 2, 1894 to elect the town council, consisting of a mayor and six aldermen, each elected for a one-year term.

The mayor was elected through First past the post; the aldermen were elected through Plurality block voting, with each voter able to cast as many as six votes. 175 voters voted, casting about 800 votes for aldermen.

== Voter turnout ==
Voter turnout was 175 out of 240 eligible voters, or 72.9%.

== Results ==
(bold indicates elected, italics indicate incumbent)

=== Mayor ===
Candidate	Votes	%
**Matthew McCauley**	**Acclaimed**	

=== Aldermen ===
Candidate	Votes
**Colin Strang**	**106**
**John Alexander McDougall**	**102**
**James Ross**	**101**
**Joseph Henri Picard**	**100**
**Charles Sutter**	**96**
**Cornelius Gallagher**	**81**
James Goodridge	78
George Sanderson	70
M. McLeod	46
