= John Kelly (Canadian politician) =

Canadian politician (1852–1934)

John Edmund Kelly
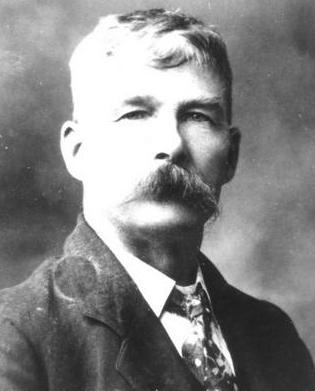

Alderman on the Edmonton Town Council
- In office January 14, 1895 – December 14, 1896

Personal details
- Born: July 2, 1852 Glengarry County, Canada West
- Died: September 1934 (aged 83) Edmonton, Alberta
- Profession: Engineer

John Edmund Kelly (1852 – 1934) was a Canadian politician in Northwest Territories who served as a municipal councillor in Edmonton in the final decade before it became the capital of the newly created province of Alberta.

== Biography ==
Kelly was born in Glengarry County, Canada West on July 2, 1852. He was trained as a marine and mechanical engineer. He settled in Fort Macleod, North-West Territories (NWT) in 1879, and subsequently built the first sawmill at Pincher Creek.

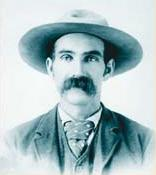
John Kelly

Kelly came to Edmonton, NWT, in 1883. In 1892, he ran for election to Edmonton's first town council as an alderman. He was defeated, placing eleventh of fourteen candidates (the top six were elected). He was successful in his second attempt, in 1895, and was re-elected in 1896, placing sixth of eight candidates. He did not seek re-election in December 1896, and stayed out of politics thereafter.

He was in charge of construction of Edmonton's first power plant in 1900. The province of Alberta was created out of the NWT in 1905, with Edmonton chosen as the capital. Kelly constructed an office building in downtown Edmonton in 1914, which came to be known as the Kelly Ramsey Building after it was conjoined with a building constructed in 1926 by James Ramsey.

Kelly moved to California circa 1920. He died at the age of 83, leaving behind seven children.
