= List of mayors of Edmonton =

Mayor of Edmonton
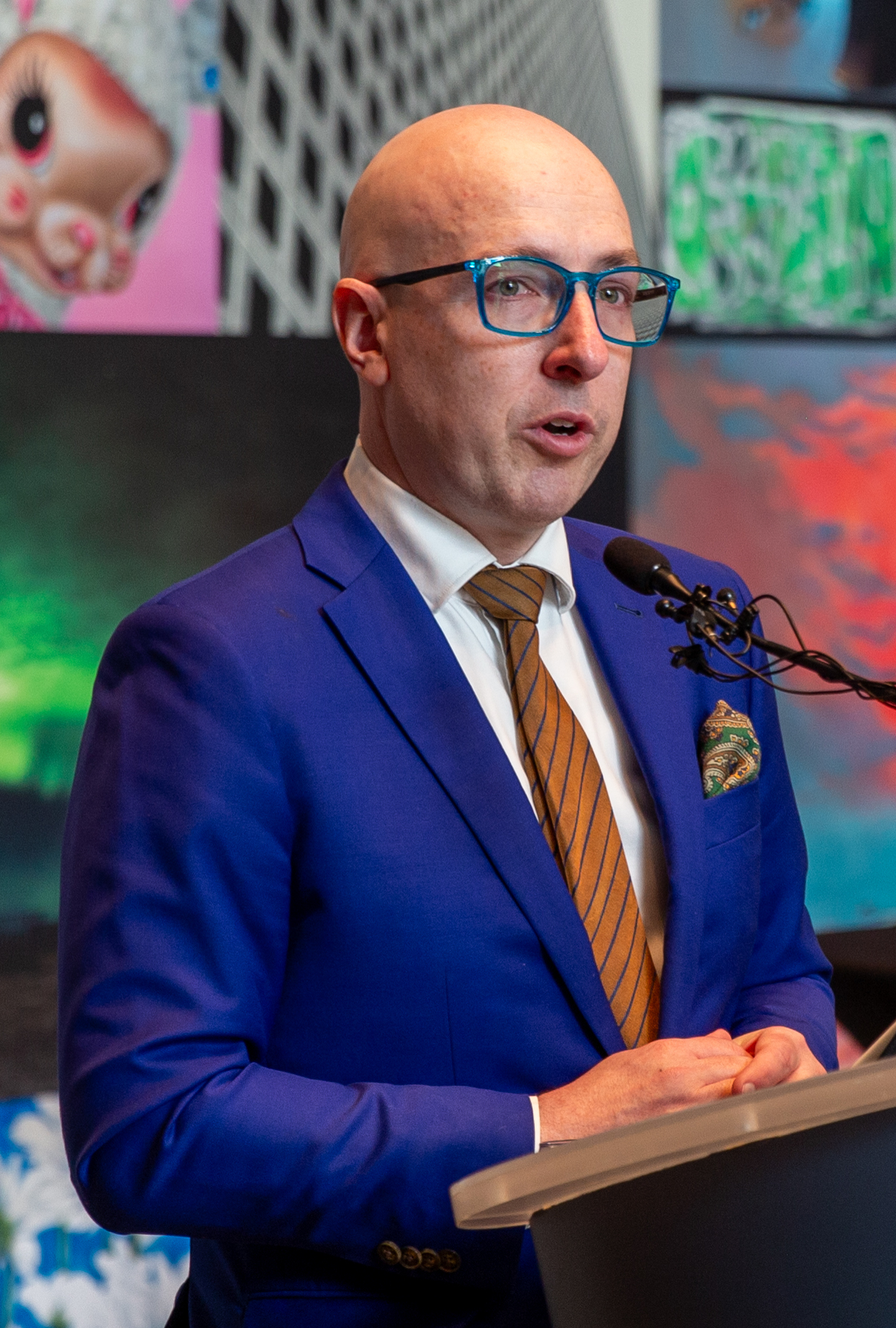
- Incumbent; Andrew Knack since October 29, 2025
- Style: Mayor, His/Her Worship
- Member of: City Council
- Reports to: City Council
- Seat: Edmonton City Hall, Edmonton, Alberta, Canada
- Appointer: Direct election by residents of Edmonton (Note: When a sitting mayor can not finish their term, Edmonton City Council itself votes for a replacement/interim mayor from within its own members)
- Term length: 4 years
- Formation: February 10, 1892; 134 years ago
- First holder: Matthew McCauley
- Website: The Mayor of Edmonton

This is a list of mayors of Edmonton, a city in Alberta, Canada.

Edmonton was incorporated as a town on January 9, 1892, with Matthew McCauley acclaimed as its first mayor during the town's first election, held February 10, 1892. On October 8, 1904, Edmonton became a city during the tenure of Mayor William Short. Edmonton was part of the North-West Territories until September 1, 1905, when it became the capital of the newly created province of Alberta, during the tenure of Mayor Kenneth W. MacKenzie. The longest serving mayor is William Hawrelak, who was elected as mayor seven times, serving for a total of 10 years 4 months over three periods: four consecutive terms starting 1951, resigned in 1959 during last month of fourth term; two consecutive terms starting 1963, expelled by the courts in 1964; one term starting in 1974, died in office in 1975.

== Mayors of Edmonton ==
Mayors of Edmonton
Mayor			Term began	Term Ended	Age at term start	Previous office
1	Portrait of Matthew McCauley	Matthew McCauley (1850–1930)	February 10, 1892	January 14, 1895	41 years, 214 days	Co-founder of the Edmonton Board of Trade
2	Portrait of Herbert Charles Wilson	Herbert Charles Wilson (1859–1909)	January 14, 1895	October 6, 1896	35 years, 38 days	Speaker of the Legislative Assembly of the North-West Territories (1888–1891)
3	Portrait of Cornelius Gallagher	Cornelius Gallagher (1854–1932)	October 27, 1896	December 14, 1896	41 years, 301 days	Alderman (1893–1895)
4	Portrait of John Alexander McDougall	John Alexander McDougall (1854–1928)	December 14, 1896	December 13, 1897	42 years, 208 days	Alderman (1893–1895)
5	Portrait of William S. Edmiston	William S. Edmiston (1857–1903)	December 13, 1897	December 11, 1899	40 years, 33 days	Alderman (1895–1896)
6	Portrait of Kenneth W. Mackenzie	Kenneth W. MacKenzie (1862–1929)	December 11, 1899	December 9, 1901	37 years, 311 days	Alderman (1898–1899)
7	Portrait of William Short in 1904	William Short (1866–1926)	December 9, 1901	December 12, 1904	35 years, 332 days	Public school trustee (1899–1901)
(6)	Portrait of Kenneth W. Mackenzie	Kenneth W. MacKenzie (1862–1929)	December 12, 1904	December 11, 1905	42 years, 313 days	Mayor of Edmonton (1899–1901)
8	Portrait of Charles May	Charles May (1858–1932)	December 11, 1905	December 10, 1906	47 years, 164 days	Alderman (1903–1905)
9	Portrait of William Griesbach	William Antrobus Griesbach (1878–1945)	December 10, 1906	December 9, 1907	28 years, 341 days	Alderman (1904–1906)
(4)	Portrait of John Alexander McDougall	John Alexander McDougall (1854–1928)	December 9, 1907	December 14, 1908	53 years, 203 days	Mayor of Edmonton (1896–1897)
10	Portrait of Robert Lee	Robert Lee (1862–1925)	December 14, 1908	December 12, 1910	46 years, 279 days	Alderman (1899–1901 & 1907–1908)
11	Portrait of George S. Armstrong	George S. Armstrong (1867–1947)	December 12, 1910	December 9, 1912	43 years, 210 days	Alderman (1907–1910)
(7)	Portrait of William Short in 1904	William Short (1866–1926)	December 9, 1912	December 8, 1913	46 years, 333 days	Mayor of Edmonton (1901–1904)
12	Portrait of William J. McNamara	William J. McNamara (1879–1947)	December 8, 1913	October 27, 1914	33 years, 346 days	Mayor of Wetaskiwin (1909–1910)
13	Portrait of William Thomas Henry	William Thomas Henry (1872–1952)	December 14, 1914	December 10, 1917	42 years, 346 days	Alderman (1900–1902)
14		Harry Marshall Erskine Evans (1876–1973)	December 10, 1917	December 9, 1918	41 years, 115 days	President of Edmonton Board of Trade (1916–1917)
15	Portrait of Joseph Clarke	Joseph Clarke (1869–1941)	December 9, 1918	December 13, 1920	49 years, 80 days	Alderman (1912 & 1913–1915)
16	Portrait of David Milwyn Duggan	David Milwyn Duggan (1879–1942)	December 13, 1920	December 10, 1923	41 years, 222 days	None
17	Portrait of Kenny Blatchford	Kenny Blatchford (1882–1933)	December 10, 1923	December 13, 1926	41 years, 280 days	Alderman (1921–1923)
18	Portrait of Ambrose Bury	Ambrose Bury (1869–1951)	December 13, 1926	December 9, 1929	57 years, 134 days	Member of Parliament for Edmonton East (1925–1926)
19	Portrait of James McCrie Douglas	James McCrie Douglas (1867–1950)	December 9, 1929	November 11, 1931	62 years, 307 days	Alderman (1923–1926)
20	Portrait of Dan Knott	Dan Knott (1879–1959)	November 11, 1931	November 14, 1934	52 years, 133 days	Alderman (1922–1926 & 1929–1931)
(15)	Portrait of Joseph Clarke	Joseph Clarke (1869–1941)	November 14, 1934	November 10, 1937	65 years, 55 days	Alderman (1924–1925)
21	Portrait of John Wesley Fry	John Wesley Fry (1876–1946)	November 10, 1937	November 7, 1945	60 years, 340 days	Alderman (1932–1937)
22		Harry Ainlay (1887–1970)	November 7, 1945	November 2, 1949	58 years, 308 days	Alderman (1931–1935 & 1941–1945)
23		Sidney Parsons (1893–1955)	November 2, 1949	November 7, 1951	56 years, 205 days	Alderman (1938–1949)
24		William Hawrelak (1915–1975)	November 7, 1951	September 9, 1959	36 years, 35 days	Alderman (1949–1951)
25		Frederick John Mitchell (1893–1979)	September 9, 1959	October 14, 1959	65 years, 279 days	Alderman (1940–1959)
26	Elmer Ernest Roper	Elmer Ernest Roper (1893–1994)	October 14, 1959	October 16, 1963	66 years, 132 days	Leader of Alberta Co-operative Commonwealth Federation (1942–1955)
(24)		William Hawrelak (1915–1975)	October 16, 1963	March 11, 1965	48 years, 13 days	Mayor of Edmonton (1951–1959)
27		Vincent Dantzer (1923–2001)	March 11, 1965	October 16, 1968	41 years, 160 days	Alderman (1962–1965)
28		Ivor Dent (1924–2009)	October 16, 1968	October 16, 1974	44 years, 252 days	Alderman (1963–1968)
(24)		William Hawrelak (1915–1975)	October 16, 1974	November 7, 1975	59 years, 13 days	Mayor of Edmonton (1951–1959 & 1963–1965)
29		Terry Cavanagh (1926–2017)	November 14, 1975*	October 19, 1977	49 years, 118 days	Alderman (1971–1975)
30		Cec Purves (b. 1933)	October 19, 1977	October 17, 1983	44 years, 1 day	Alderman (1966–1974)
31		Laurence Decore (1940–1999)	October 17, 1983	October 17, 1988	43 years, 111 days	Alderman (1974–1977)
(29)		Terry Cavanagh (1926–2017)	October 17, 1988*	October 16, 1989	62 years, 90 days	Alderman (1983–1988)
32		Jan Reimer (b. 1952)	October 16, 1989	October 16, 1995	37 years, 146 days	Alderman (1980–1989)
33		Bill Smith (b. 1934)	October 16, 1995	October 26, 2004	59 years, 309 days	None
34	Stephen Mandel	Stephen Mandel (b. 1945)	October 26, 2004	October 29, 2013	59 years, 100 days	City Councillor (2001–2004)
35	Don Iveson	Don Iveson (b. 1979)	October 29, 2013	October 26, 2021	34 years, 152 days	City Councillor (2007–2013)
36	Amarjeet Sohi	Amarjeet Sohi (b. 1964)	October 25, 2021	October 29, 2025	62 years, 183 days	City Councillor (2007–2015)
37	Andrew Knack	Andrew Knack (b. 1983/84)	October 29, 2025	Incumbent	41 or 42	City Councillor (2013–2025)

- Terry Cavanagh was never elected to the mayor's spot. Twice he sat in the mayor's chair. He was interim or acting mayor after Hawrelak's death and after Decore's resignation.

== See also ==
- List of mayors in Canada
- List of mayors of Strathcona, Alberta
- Timeline of Edmonton history
