= George Pringle Sanderson =

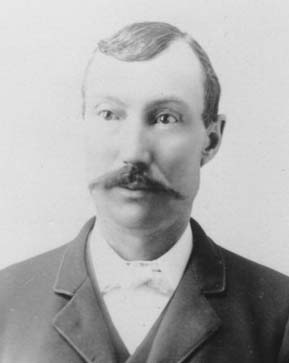

Alderman on the Edmonton Town Council
- In office January 3, 1893 – January 2, 1894
- In office July 1896 – December 14, 1896

Personal details
- Born: December 24, 1850 Carleton Place, Ontario
- Died: October 27, 1940 (aged 89) Edmonton, Alberta
- Spouse: Julia Simpson (4 children)
- Profession: Blacksmith, locksmith

George Pringle Sanderson (December 24, 1850 – October 27, 1940) was a politician in Alberta, Canada and a municipal councillor in Edmonton.

== Biography ==
George Sanderson was born December 24, 1850, in Carleton Place, Ontario. He moved to Winnipeg in 1877 to work as a blacksmith before moving further west, to Prince Albert, Saskatchewan by ox cart. He came to Edmonton in 1881 by buckboard. He became the settlement's second blacksmith and first locksmith. He returned temporarily to Winnipeg in 1883 to marry Julia Simpson, with whom he had four children.

He became Edmonton's first fire chief in 1892, the same year as he ran in Edmonton's first election for town council. He failed to become alderman, finishing in a tie for eighth of fourteen candidates (the top six were elected). He was more successful in 1893, when he finished fifth of nine candidates, but was defeated in his 1894 re-election bid, finishing eighth of nine candidates.

In 1896, alderman Isaac Cowie resigned, and Sanderson was appointed by Council to take his place. He did not seek re-election in the next election. His last foray into public life took place in 1905, when he finished last of ten candidates in a bid to return as an alderman.

George Pringle Sanderson died in October 1940. He was buried on October 30, 1940.
