= Herbert Charles Wilson =

Canadian politician (1859–1909)

The Honourable Herbert Charles Wilson
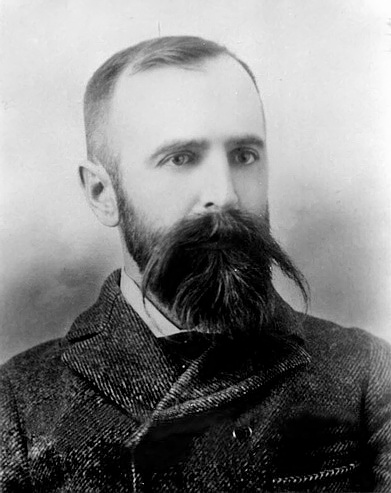
- H. C. Wilson in 1895

Speaker of the Legislative Assembly of the North-West Territories
- In office June 30, 1888 – November 7, 1891
- Preceded by: Edgar Dewdney
- Succeeded by: James H. Ross

2nd Mayor of Edmonton
- In office January 14, 1895 – October 6, 1896
- Preceded by: Matthew McCauley
- Succeeded by: Cornelius Gallagher

Member of Territorial Council for Edmonton
- In office September 15, 1885 – November 7, 1891
- Preceded by: Frank Oliver
- Succeeded by: Frank Oliver

Personal details
- Born: December 7, 1859 Picton, Province of Canada
- Died: December 17, 1909 (aged 50) Edmonton, Alberta, Canada
- Party: Independent; Liberal-Conservative
- Spouse: Emily Charlotte Lee (m. 1885)
- Occupation: Politician; physician

Herbert Charles Wilson (December 7, 1859 – December 17, 1909) was a Canadian politician and physician. He was an elected member of the Legislative Assembly of the North-West Territories, representing Edmonton and also served as mayor of the Town of Edmonton, 1895-1897.

Wilson was born in 1859 in Canada West (now Ontario). The son of a manufacturer, Wilson's family had extensive business interests in the area of Picton, Ontario. Wilson studied medicine and moved to Edmonton in 1882, one of the first physicians to settle there. He was appointed to official medical positions and, for several years, owned a drugstore in the hamlet. He served as a consultant to First Nations reserves near Edmonton and also became a director of many local corporations. He was elected to the Territorial council in 1885, and soon became its speaker. During his speakership, he helped to change the council's rules and procedures. He left territorial politics after six years, citing health reasons. He maintained a medical practice in town for many years, and went to considerable efforts to keep up with the latest practices.

Wilson interested himself in civic activities in Edmonton, and eventually ran for town mayor, winning election in 1895. He left office after less than two years in a dispute over town funds. He attempted a comeback in 1904, but was defeated in a run for the town council. He married in 1886, and had a son and two daughters. He died in 1909; an industrial park in the city is named for him.

== Early life and education ==
Wilson was born in Picton, Canada West (now Ontario), the only son of Charles Stewart (c. 1827–October 28, 1900) and Eliza Maria (née Biggar) (c. 1832–1867) Wilson. His father was a well-known manufacturer of carriages and sailing ships and a leading banker in his hometown. Additionally, he served as a councillor and mayor of Picton, and was a good friend of Prime Minister John A. Macdonald. Wilson's mother was a daughter of Charles Biggar, who, like Wilson's paternal grandfather, Stewart Charles Wilson, was of United Empire Loyalist descent. One of Wilson's uncles, James Lyons Biggar, was Member of Parliament for Northumberland East, Ontario. Wilson's mother died in February 1867 when he was seven years old. His father later rewed, marrying Louisa Maria Colley; they had a daughter, born in about 1870. The Wilson family was of Irish descent.

After attending public high schools in Picton, Wilson went on to study at the Upper Canada College, before graduating from the Ontario College of Pharmacy on February 7, 1878. He went on to attend Trinity Medical School in 1878 and achieved Bachelor of Medicine and Doctorate of Medicine degrees in 1882 and 1883 respectively.

== Early career ==
Wilson moved west to the town of Edmonton in the North-West Territories in 1882 and, shortly after arriving, became active in the local community. He was elected as Director of the Edmonton Literary Club in October 1882 and, in 1883, became a member of a Methodist church committee. He also served as president of the Edmonton Cricket Club, Edmonton Curling Club, Edmonton Gas and Oil Company and as director of the Edmonton Building and Investment Company.

Wilson registered as a medical practitioner in the North-West Territories in 1886 and again in 1906 when Alberta became the province of Alberta. As one of the first physicians in Edmonton, Wilson opened the first drug store, next to his office and served as a medical consultant to nearby First Nations reserves in addition to serving as the official police surgeon for the North-West Mounted Police district of Edmonton from 1886 to 1887, a coroner for Edmonton and the North-West Territories and an examiner for numerous insurance companies.

Pressed for time by his recent marriage to Emily Lee earlier in the year, an increase in practice due to the town's rapid population growth and his increasing political roles, Wilson sold his drug store in 1886 to Philip Daly, who himself later was a town alderman, . He then partnered with Herman McInnes in practice.

== Politics ==
Wilson entered territorial politics when he ran to be the elected representative for the Edmonton district on the Territorial Council. He was elected on September 15, 1885, at the age of 25, to become the youngest member of the council. He defeated the sitting member, Frank Oliver, by 120 votes to 111.

In 1886, Wilson, along with William Dell Perley and James Hamilton Ross, was part of a delegation sent to Ottawa by the North-West Territories to deliver a council-agreed reply to the Speech from the throne. He remained on the council until its abolition in 1888. That year the Council was re-constituted as an "Assembly" and he was elected to the first Legislative Assembly of the Northwest Territories, along with his onetime opponent and fellow Edmontonian Frank Oliver. (The Edmonton district elected two members at this time.)

=== Speaker of the Legislative Assembly ===
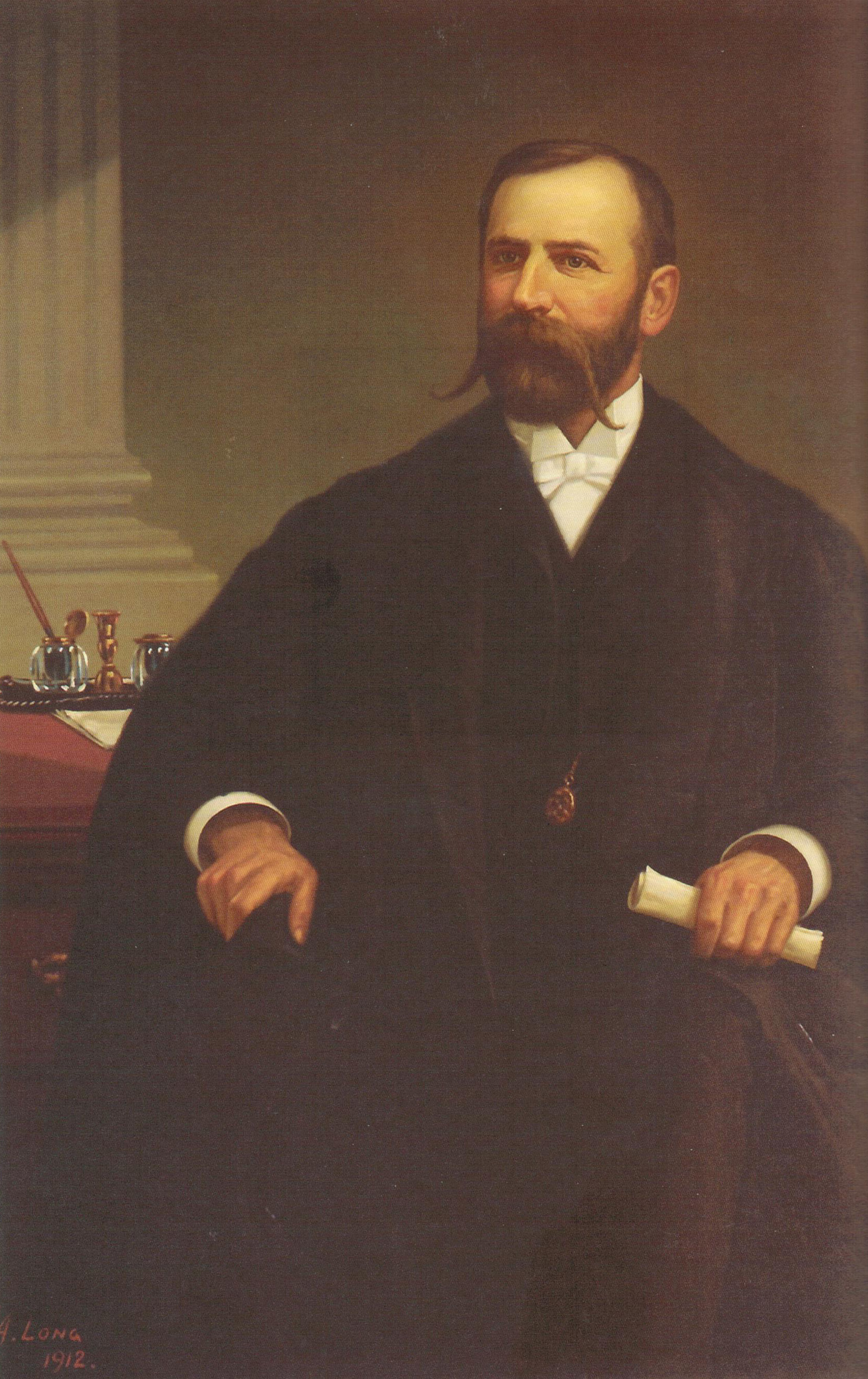
Wilson's official portrait as speaker of the Legislative Assembly, by Victor A. Long.

Wilson was nominated by Hugh Cayley, a member of the Legislative Assembly of the Northwest Territories from Calgary, for speaker of the Assembly prior to the opening of the first session, on October 31, 1888. It was commonly assumed that James H. Ross would be the first speaker, but Wilson's name was mentioned for the position and it was decided to hold a vote. After the first three ballots ended in ties, Ross called upon his supporters to vote for Wilson, who was then elected unanimously.

In 1888, Lieutenant Governor Joseph Royal presented Wilson with a petition against the controversial election of Hillyard Mitchell, member for Batoche, over opponent George L. Fisher. Wilson presented the petition, as well as a verbal message from Lieutenant-Governor Royal, initiating a discussion of proper procedures of receiving petitions in the Assembly. The petition was subsequently read, and sent to the Committee on Privileges and Elections. The Committee ruled in its report that the petitioners did not follow correct procedures, and Mitchell's victory was affirmed. On November 30, 1888, Wilson hosted a dinner for members and other guests in a hotel in Regina, the "first of the kind in the history of the North-West Legislative Assembly".

As Speaker, Wilson also helped revise the rules and forms of proceedings of the Legislative Assembly, and served on the Standing Committee on Standing Orders and Library. In 1891, Wilson left territorial politics after 6 years, citing health reasons. He was succeeded as speaker by James H. Ross.

== Post-territorial politics ==
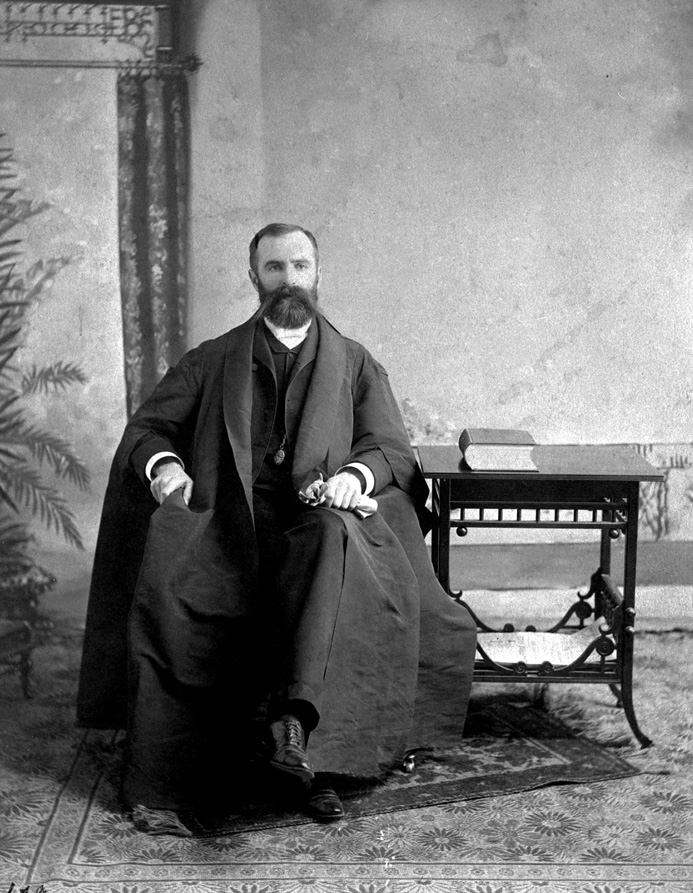
Herbert Charles Wilson photographed in 1885, about the time he was elected to the territorial council.

Wilson returned to Edmonton after his retirement as speaker and continued to be an active community member. He served as President of the Edmonton Liberal Conservative Association in 1892, and of the Upper Canada Boys' Association in Edmonton in 1909, the North Alberta Medical Society, and the Alberta Medical Association in 1907. He was also a member of many community organizations and corporations—the Edmonton Old Timers' Association, Council of the College Physicians and Surgeons of the North-West Territories, Edmonton Electric Lighting and Power Company (presently EPCOR). He was a patron of both the Edmonton and Fort Saskatchewan Rifle Associations.

Wilson spent a year in Europe with his wife and took post-graduate education in Edinburgh and London. In 1894, along with 5 other physicians, he sent a letter to Vital-Justin Grandin to support the building of a general hospital by the Grey Nuns, which was opened on December 15 of the next year. He served on the medical board, until his resignation in 1899 over a disagreement regarding patient admission. He was appointed Justice of Peace of Edmonton in 1895.

=== Mayor of Edmonton ===
In the 1895 municipal election, Wilson was elected mayor of Edmonton, defeating John Alexander McDougall. Important issues in the election included choosing a site for the building of the High Level Bridge, securing funds for a hospital, and lowering high insurance rates.

Wilson was acclaimed mayor in 1896, but resigned in October the same year due to a dispute over town funds, stating "I regret very much that this simple affair has assumed such a disgraceful form [and] had to be fought out in the manner".

He attempted a comeback in 1904 by running for alderman for the newly formed City of Edmonton, but he was defeated, finishing fourteenth of seventeen candidates.

== Personal life ==
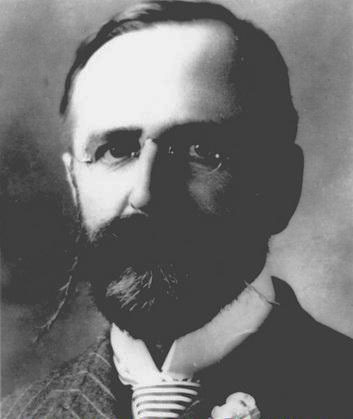
Wilson in 1904 as a member of the Edmonton Old Timer' Association.

In Toronto, on September 15, 1886, he married Emily Charlotte Lee in a traditional ceremony at St. Peter's Anglican Church. Emily Wilson owned a piano, one of the first in Edmonton, and it was used at various dances, an activity the couple enjoyed. The Wilsons were friends of many notable early leading Canadian figures, such as Father Albert Lacombe, Charles Tupper, and Amédée Forget.

The Wilsons had a son, Charles Arthur (born 1887), and two daughters, Violet Henrietta (born 1890) and Marjorie (born 1894). Charles like his father attended Upper Canada College, and became a law student at an Edmonton-based law firm. Charles Wilson Jr served in the 49th Battalion, and was killed in action at the Battle of Sanctuary Wood in 1916. Violet served overseas with the St. John's Ambulance Brigade as a voluntary aid worker. She later worked as an immigration officer, broadcaster, and author. The couple's younger daughter, Marjorie, was a nurse.

== Death and legacy ==
Wilson died in Edmonton on December 17, 1909, at the age of 50, following a stroke. He had a history of health problems, including a neurological disorder. His partner in medical practice, Herman McInnes, attended him in his final illness. Wilson's funeral, which was held on December 19, had a procession that "extended for half a mile [and comprised] nearly one-hundred vehicles". He was buried at the Edmonton Cemetery. In 1947, following the death of his wife, Emily, she was buried next to him.

After his death, a newspaper stated that Wilson was "in the best sense of the phrase, a great practitioner of the old school, he was not in any sense an 'old fogey' of a doctor, rather, he made it a practice to visit eastern hospitals at frequent [sic] to keep in touch with medical progress". He was also described as "an active, public-spirited citizen" of which "kindliness and geniality were outstanding qualities in his nature".

Wilson Industrial Park in Edmonton was named in his honor in 1975.

== Bibliography ==
- Perry, Sandra E.; Footz, Valerie L. (2006). A Higher Duty : Speakers of the Legislative Assemblies of the North-West Territories and Alberta, 1888–2005. Edmonton, Alberta: Legislative Assembly of Alberta. ISBN 0-9689217-3-6.

Political offices
Preceded by Matthew McCauley	Mayor of Edmonton; 1895–1896	Succeeded by Cornelius Gallagher
Legislative Assembly of the Northwest Territories
Preceded by Frank Oliver	MLA Edmonton; 1885–1891	Succeeded by Frank Oliver
Preceded by Edgar Dewdney	Speaker of the Legislative Assembly of Northwest Territories; 1888–1891	Succeeded by James Hamilton Ross
