= John Cameron (Alberta politician) =

Canadian politician (1846–1919)

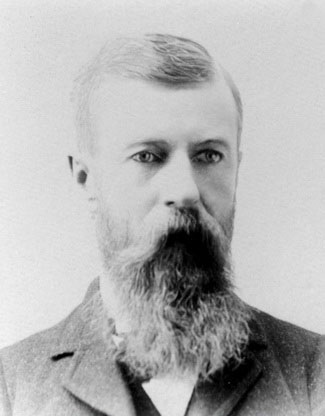

Alderman on the Edmonton Town Council
- In office February 10, 1892 – January 13, 1893
- In office January 14, 1895 – January 13, 1896

Personal details
- Born: May 28, 1846 East Hawkesbury, Province of Canada
- Died: October 6, 1919 (aged 73) Edmonton, Alberta, Canada
- Spouses: Jane Vogan (m. 1872, died) Elizabeth Ann McCann (m. 1875)
- Profession: Merchant

John Cameron^{[n1]} (May 28, 1846 – October 6, 1919) was a merchant and politician in Alberta, Canada and a municipal councillor in Edmonton. He is regarded as one of the city's pioneer citizens.

Born in Canada West (later Ontario), Cameron worked as a merchant in his birth province and Manitoba before coming to Edmonton in 1881. In Edmonton he continued as a merchant, owning and operating a store for 15 years. In Edmonton he quickly established himself as a prominent citizen, serving on the inaugural Edmonton Board of Trade as president, which he would remain for five years. Cameron also was involved in the development of the Edmonton Public School Board, serving on the board in the 1890s. He was also involved in the town's politics, winning election to Edmonton's first town council in 1892 and serving an additional term when elected in 1895. After his retirement from politics, he worked in the coal and real estate business until his death in 1919, at the age of 73. Upon his death, he was lauded as one of the pioneer citizens of Edmonton; a street, neighbourhood and ravine were named for him.

== Early life and career ==
John Cameron was born at East Hawkesbury, Canada West in 1846, the son of Colin and Anna (née McLaurin) Cameron. His brother was Sir Douglas Cameron, who also went into politics, serving in the Ontario Legislature and as Lieutenant Governor of Manitoba. John attended school in Hawkesbury and Renfrew and in 1871 became a merchant at Vankleek Hill, with a partner in the firm Cameron & Mode General Merchants. In 1876, he went west and relocated to Winnipeg, Manitoba to establish Cameron & Company general merchants, where he remained until 1881.

== Career in Edmonton ==
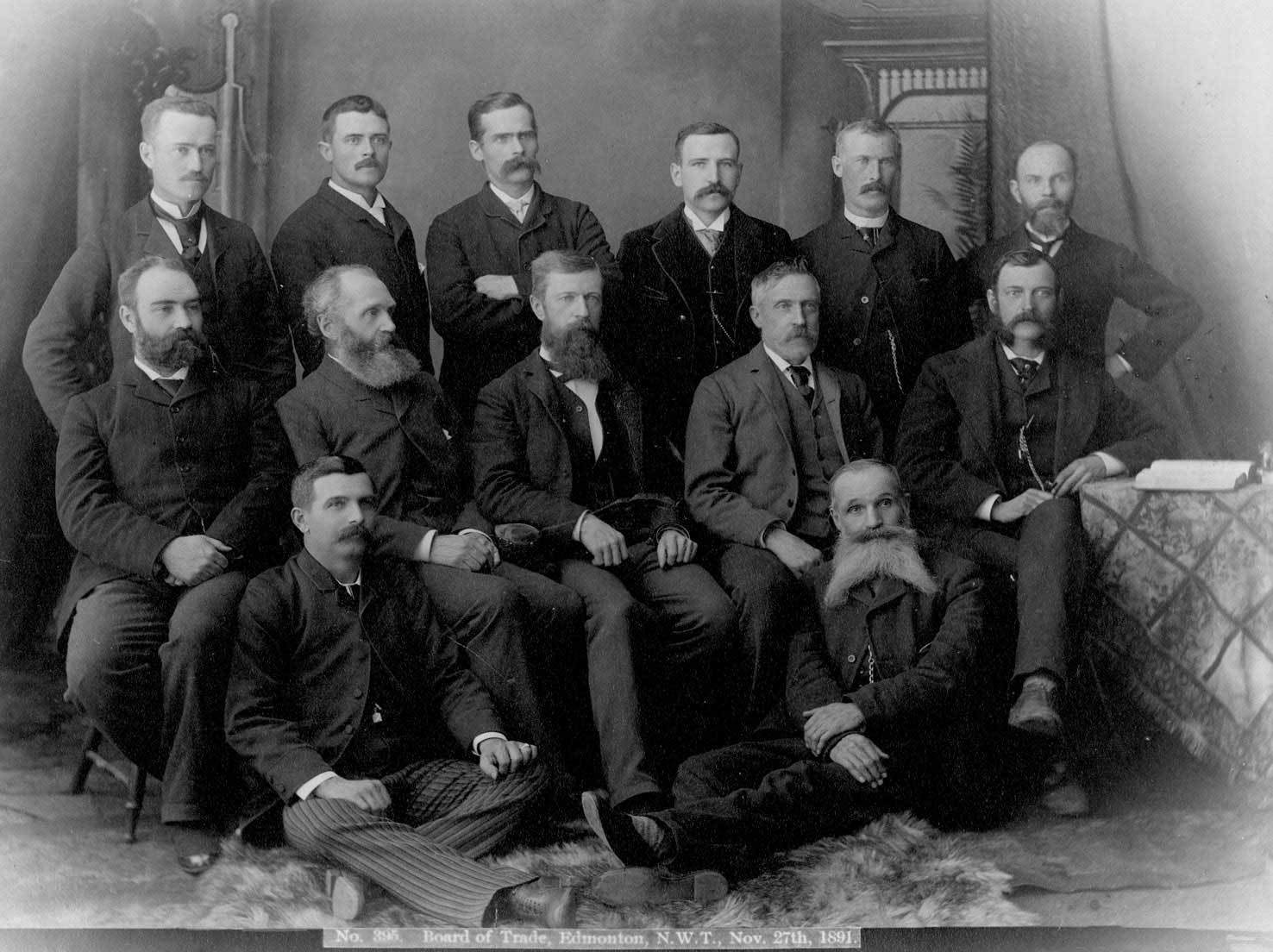
Edmonton Board of Trade, 1891. John Cameron is seated in the middle row, third left.

Cameron moved from Winnipeg to Edmonton in 1881 by ox-cart, travelling through Carlton and Battleford, bringing with him 96,000 pounds (44,000 kg) of freight on a journey that took three months. Once in Edmonton, he used this freight as the initial inventory of a store, the A. McDonald Company, where he entered into a partnership. In 1891, he would purchase the store from its original owner, A. McDonald. He moved into a new building in 1893, designed by architect William S. Edmiston and constructed by contractor Kenneth McLeod. The building, located on Jasper Avenue, included a cellar, main floor for merchandise and storage, and an upper storey, heated in its entirety by a furnace. He would operate until 1896. After the sale of the store, he entered into the real estate and coal business. In 1914, Cameron was serving as managing director and treasurer of Gainford Colleries Ltd. and as chairman of the provisional directors of the Canada Northwest Loan and Mortgage Company.

He was elected the first president of the Edmonton Board of Trade upon its founding in 1889. He served until 1894. He also played a vital role in the development of the school system in Edmonton, involving himself in education-related affairs as early as 1881, and serving on the public school board from 1886–87 and 1889 until 1897. In 1881, he was part of a group that provided funds for the first school teacher in the city. In 1886, with the school board, Cameron was responsible for introducing a fee for the parents of students attending schools in the Edmonton Public School District who did not live within the district, as district residents were taxed for the school's services. He would serve as secretary-treasurer from 1882 to 1884 and later as chairman of the school board from 1890 to 1892 and 1894.

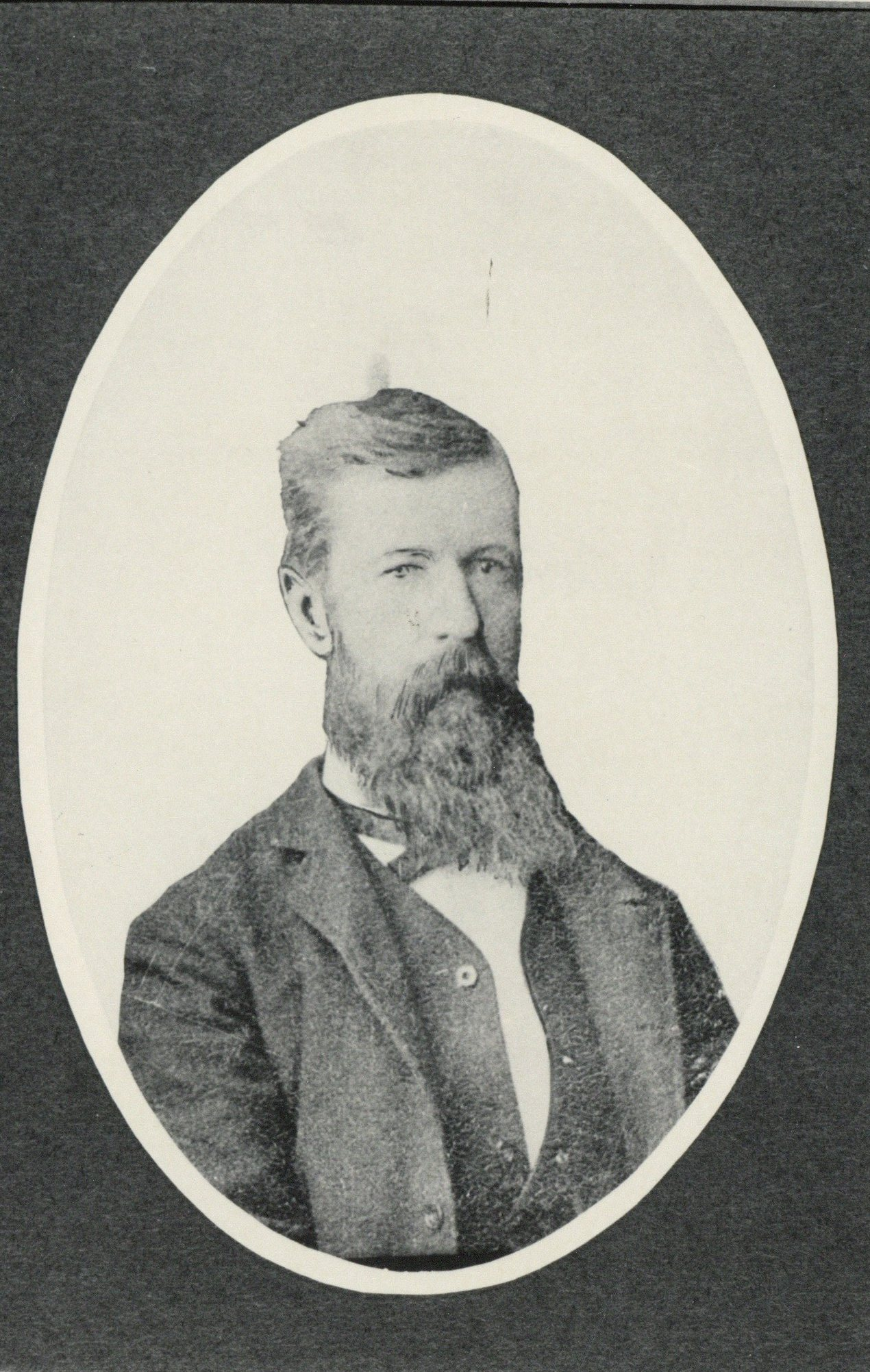
John Cameron during his time as a school board trustee

=== Civic politics ===
Cameron was one of six candidates elected as aldermen to Edmonton's first town council in 1892; he received the fifth most votes of the fourteen candidates. He was defeated in his 1893 re-election bid, in which he finished seventh of nine candidates. He briefly returned to the council after being elected again in 1895, but did not seek re-election the following year and remained out of politics thereafter. During his first term on the council, he was involved in an altercation in which the dominion government had made a decision to Dominion Land Office from Edmonton to Strathcona, at the time a separate town, south of the North Saskatchewan River. When news of the decision and crews to execute it arrived in Edmonton, angry citizens descended on the office and tore to pieces the wagon that the officer was packing with records for transportation. Led by mayor Matthew McCauley, Cameron was part of a group of prominent citizens that headed the resistance, eventually leading to the dominion reversing its decision.

== Personal life ==
At Vankleek Hill in 1872, he married Jane Vogan. She would die some time afterwards, and John Cameron, aged 29, would remarry Elizabeth Ann McCann on November 8, 1875. They had two sons, John Hilliard and Howard, and four daughters, Mabel, Florence, Alice and Jessie. He was a member of the Edmonton Old Timers' Association as well as the Edmonton Agricultural Society. He was an avid outdoorsman who enjoyed canoeing and hiking in the Edmonton North Saskatchewan River Valley. Along with his wife Elizabeth, he was an early member of the Presbyterian church in Edmonton, attending First Presbyterian Church, where he was an elder. Though he served as an independent on the Edmonton Town Council, he was a Liberal.

== Death and legacy ==
He died of heart failure in the morning of October 6, 1919 after a brief illness at his Edmonton home. He was survived by his wife and children. After his funeral at his home on Cameron Avenue, he was buried at the Edmonton Cemetery. At the time of his death, the Edmonton Bulletin praised Cameron for his efforts in establishing the foundations of the city Edmonton, and remarked that "the city owes much to him because of his strenuous efforts with others in maintaining this as the permanent site for the city". Elizabeth Cameron died in Edmonton in 1933 at the age of 79.

Cameron Street, the neighbourhood of Cameron Heights, and the Cameron Ravine (in the vicinity of Cameron Heights) in Edmonton are named in honour.

== Notes ==
- ^[n1]Not to be confused with John Cameron (1874–1912), a prominent Edmonton hotelier in the same time period

== Bibliography ==
- Aubrey, Merrily K. (2004), Naming Edmonton: From Ada to Zoie, Edmonton, Alberta: University of Alberta, ISBN 978-0-88864-423-7
- Bolwer, Jim (1968), "Matthew McCauley", Alberta Historical Review, vol. 20, pp. 11–17
- Munro, Kenneth (2007), First Presbyterian Church, Edmonton: A History, Victoria, British Columbia: Trafford Publishing, ISBN 9781412221986
- Kostek, Michael A. (1992), A Century and Ten: History of Edmonton Public Schools, Edmonton, Alberta: Edmonton Public Schools, ISBN 978-0-9697119-0-2
