= James Ross (Alberta politician) =

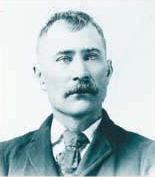

Alderman on the Edmonton Town Council
- In office January 2, 1894 – January 14, 1895
- In office December 13, 1897 – December 12, 1898
- In office December 8, 1902 – December 12, 1904

Personal details
- Born: August 14, 1851 Toronto, Ontario
- Died: July 21, 1936 (aged 84) Edmonton, Alberta
- Spouse: Ellen McBeath (7 children)
- Profession: Tinsmith

James Ross (August 14, 1851 – June 21, 1936) was a politician in Alberta, Canada and a municipal councillor in Edmonton.

== Biography ==
Ross was born August 14, 1851, in Toronto. He received his apprenticeship in tinsmithing and worked as a journeyman. He moved to Edmonton in 1878 and established a tinshop in 1882. In 1883, he created the Ross Brothers general hardware store with his brother, Frederick. They sold the business in 1912. He was director of the Western Canadian Vinegar Company and Vice President of the Alberta Milling Company.

James Ross married Ellen McBeath of Edmonton; the pair had seven children. He was active with the Freemasons, Methodist Church, and the Liberal Party of Alberta.

In 1892, Ross ran for alderman on Edmonton's first town council. He finished twelfth of fourteen candidates, and was not elected (the top six were). However, he was elected in his second attempt, in 1894, when he finished third of nine candidates. He served one year, and withdrew from politics until 1897, when he was elected to both the town council (on which he served one year) and the public school board (on which he served two years). His final foray into politics took place during the 1902 election, when he was elected to the town council for a third time. Aldermanic terms had been extended to two years, so Ross served until 1904. He did not seek re-election.

James Ross died June 21, 1936.
