= Colin Strang (politician) =

Canadian politician (1850–1900)

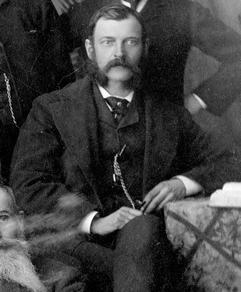

Alderman on the Edmonton Town Council
- In office February 10, 1892 – January 13, 1896
- In office December 11, 1899 – October 9, 1900

Personal details
- Born: June 25, 1850 Toronto, Canada West
- Died: December 10, 1900 (aged 50) Edmonton, Alberta
- Spouse: Emily Price
- Profession: Accountant

Colin Ferrie Strang (June 25, 1850 – December 10, 1900) was a politician in Alberta, Canada, and an alderman on Edmonton Town Council.

== Biography ==
Strang was born in 1850 in Toronto to Struthers Strang, originally from Scotland and Janet Ferrie. He was educated in Hamilton. After a period working for hardware dealers W. McGivern & Co., in 1871 he moved to Winnipeg, where he worked as a bookkeeper (eventually as the head of his own accounting office) until moving to Edmonton in 1883. He became Edmonton's leading city accountant, and also worked as bank manager for Lafferty & Moore in 1890 and as business manager for the Moore and MacDowell sawmill in 1893. He was part owner of Ross Bros., a hardware firm.

In 1892 he ran for alderman on Edmonton's first town council. He finished first of fourteen candidates (the top six were elected). He was re-elected in 1893, 1894, and 1895, but was defeated (finishing last of eight candidates) in 1896. Strang entered a partnership with James A. Stoval, with a firm name of Stoval & Strang, which he operated until his death.

In 1898 he ran for the public school board and was elected. He served as the board's secretary-treasurer, and was re-elected in 1899. During the same election, he returned to town council as an alderman. Aldermanic terms had been lengthened to two years, but his seat was declared vacant October 9, 1900. He did not seek public office again in his lifetime.

Colin Strang also served as secretary of both the board of trade and the Edmonton Rifle Association.

Strang died on December 10, 1900, after over a year of ill health. His final and fatal illness struck him on Friday, December 7, when he was bedridden and eventually lapsed into a coma. The news of the sudden death of his brother, Robert of Winnipeg came by telegraph just as Strang was dying. Another one of Strang's brothers, Andrew, has previously visited him in the previous fall, taking Colin, suffering from his illness at the time, back to visit Winnipeg, which resulted in Colin's health being "very much improved" upon his return to Edmonton. He was said to be "one of the best posted hardware men of the west". His wife, Emily Price, and one son survived him.
