= 1893 Edmonton municipal election =

Municipal election in Canada

Matthew McCauley, who was acclaimed as mayor in the 1893 election
John Alexander McDougall	Kenneth McLeod
Colin Strang	James Goodridge
George Sanderson	Cornelius Gallagher

The 1893 Edmonton municipal election was held January 3, 1893 to elect the town council (consisting of a mayor and six aldermen, each elected for a one-year term) and three trustees for each of the public and separate school divisions.

Mayor Matt McCauley was re-elected by acclamation so no vote was held this year to fill that position.

== Voter turnout ==
Voter turnout was 128 out of 268 eligible voters, or 47.7%.

Of those who were registered to vote, 176 were residents and 92 were non-residents (property-owners who did not live in Edmonton). No person was allowed to vote unless his taxes were paid.

== Results ==
(bold indicates elected, italics indicate incumbent)

=== Mayor ===
Candidate	Votes	%
**Matthew McCauley**	**Acclaimed**	

=== Aldermen ===
The alderman were elected through Plurality block voting with each voter being able to cast multiple votes.

Candidate	Votes
**John Alexander McDougall**	**107**
**Kenneth McLeod**	**84**
**Colin Strang**	**72**
**James Goodridge**	**64**
**George Sanderson**	**61**
**Cornelius Gallagher**	**58**
Daniel Fraser	49
John Cameron	48
A. F. DeGagne	46
