= Matthew McCauley (politician) =

Canadian politician (1850–1930)

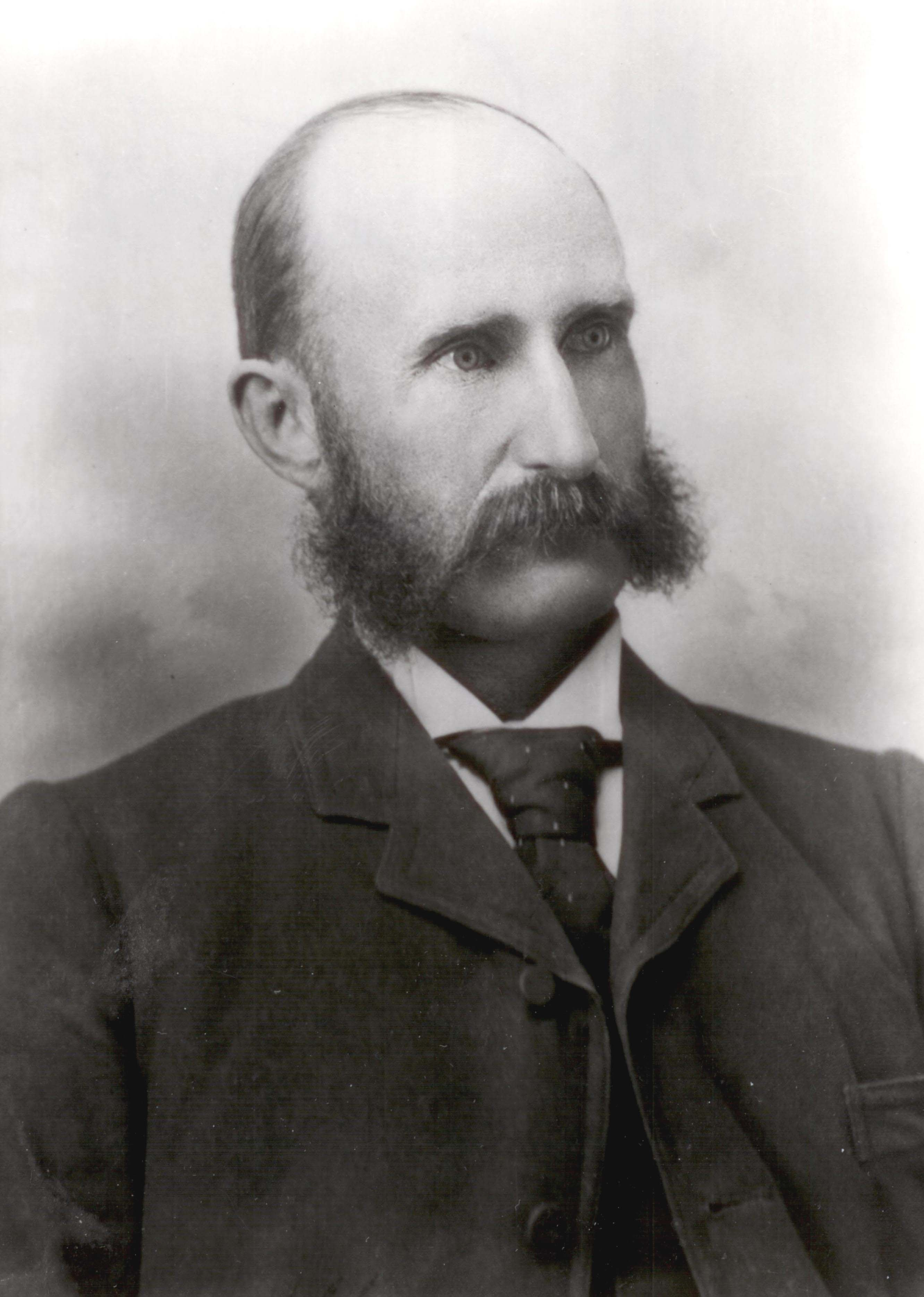

1st Mayor of Edmonton
- In office February 10, 1892 – January 14, 1895
- Succeeded by: Herbert Charles Wilson

Alderman on the Edmonton Town Council
- In office January 13, 1896 – December 14, 1896

Member of the Legislative Assembly of the Northwest Territories
- In office November 4, 1898 – May 21, 1902
- Preceded by: Frank Oliver
- Succeeded by: Richard Secord
- Constituency: Edmonton

Member of the Legislative Assembly of Alberta
- In office November 9, 1905 – March 22, 1909
- Preceded by: New District
- Succeeded by: James Bismark Holden
- Constituency: Vermilion

Personal details
- Born: July 11, 1850 Sydenham, Province of Canada
- Died: October 25, 1930 (aged 80) Sexsmith, Alberta, Canada
- Party: Alberta Liberal Party
- Spouses: Matilda Benson (m. 1875; died 1896) Annie Cookson (m. 1902)
- Profession: Businessman

Matthew McCauley (July 11, 1850 – October 25, 1930) was a Canadian farmer and politician who was the first mayor of the town of Edmonton, and a member of the legislative assemblies of both the Northwest Territories and the province of Alberta.

McCauley was born into a farming family in Sydenham, Canada West (what would become the province of Ontario) to an Irish father and Canadian mother. His restless nature and desire for adventure led him to travel west to Manitoba. In Manitoba, he established a livery business, which he ran until he set off for Edmonton in 1879. He farmed for two years in Fort Saskatchewan before finally moving to Edmonton, where he established the settlement's first livery and cartage business.

Along with a couple prominent Edmonton citizens, he formed an association aimed to restore order in the area, settling many disputes, including during the 1885 Riel Rebellion as its captain. He soon established a school board, recognizing the need for a school, which he served as president and trustee for 18 years. Shortly before Edmonton was incorporated as a town in 1892, he formed the Board of Trade. Upon the town's incorporation, he was acclaimed the town's first mayor in 1892, and the next two years. He did not run for re-election at the end of his third one-year term.

In 1896, he was elected as town alderman.

In August 1896, he ran for the seat representing Edmonton in the Territorial Legislature, which he held for six years. He ran for re-election in 1902, but Richard Secord tooks the seat.

Following this defeat he moved to Tofield, Alberta to farm. In 1905, he returned to Edmonton and was elected to the new Legislative Assembly of Alberta as the member for Vermilion. The following year, he resigned his seat to serve as the first warden of Alberta's first penitentiary. After five years as warden, he moved to British Columbia to own a fruit farm. He moved to a Sexsmith, Alberta farm 13 years later, where he died in 1930.

== Early life ==
Matthew McCauley was born July 11, 1850, in Owen Sound, Ontario, to Alexander and Eleanor (née Latimer) McCauley. His father Alexander was an Irish immigrant who was born in Antrim. He moved to Canada at the age of five, and went on to become a successful farmer. Though his early years were described as him being a "typical farm boy" of the time, he received schooling from the Owen Sound Public School. McCauley desired to follow in the footsteps of this father as a farmer after his completing his education, but his restless nature and passion for adventure set him off to the west, where he first set off to Fort Garry (later Winnipeg) in Manitoba.

McCauley established a livery business, the first of the kind in Fort Garry. He married Matilda Benson of Sarnia, Ontario, in 1875, and resided in Fort Garry with her for the next four years, where he continued to operate his livery business. After growing restless in Winnipeg in 1879, McCauley sold his business and traveled west, this time to Edmonton. McCauley arrived in Edmonton in the fall of 1879 after 21 days of travelling by ox cart. He purchased a farm in Fort Saskatchewan the following spring, and farmed for two years before moving to Edmonton in 1882. In Edmonton, he opened the town's first livery and cartage business, the Edmonton Cartage Company, and a butcher shop in 1883.

== Early activities in Edmonton ==
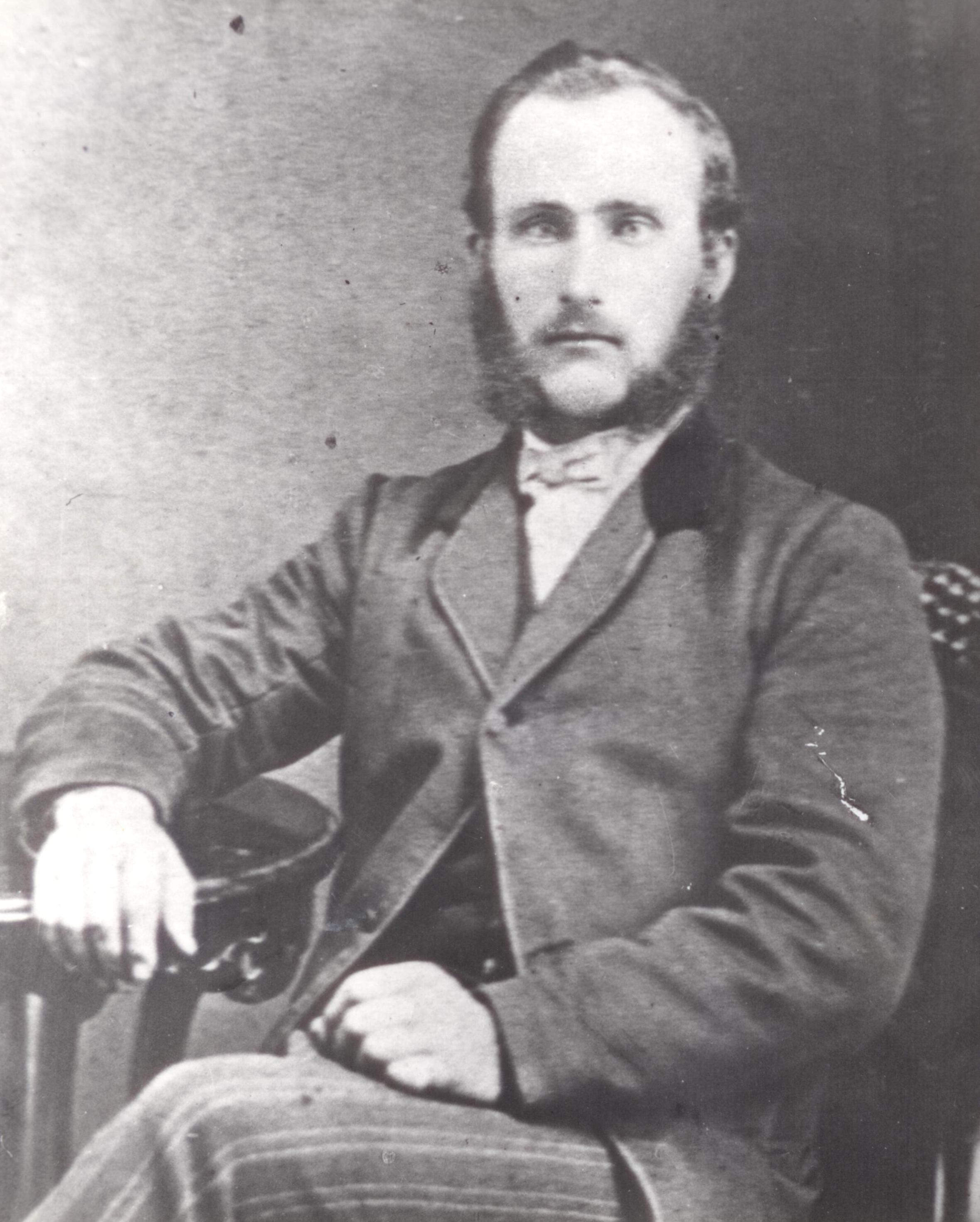
McCauley in his younger years.

=== Vigilance Committeen ===
McCauley arrived in Edmonton at the time of what has been described "one of the biggest conflicts ever" in Edmonton. The Hudson's Bay Company had recently surveyed lots of land that were intended to be sold as property, however word broke out that itsland was the only land surveyed in the district. Some people arriving in the area were unable to afford land, and therefore built shacks on land they said they believed was available. Earlier settlers requested that they move three or four miles outwards, but they refused. McCauley sent urgent requests to Ottawa to have authorities take action to settle the disputes in a civil manner, but to no avail. As a result of the government not doing anything and the lack of a law enforcement agency in the town (the NWMP being stationed in Fort Saskatchewan), a group of prominent citizens formed a "Vigilance Committee" (AKA "Protective Association") as an attempt to ensure that property would not be taken away from early settlers holding land by mere possession with no formal title yet being established. McCauley, then still in his 20s, was elected its captain.

As captain, McCauley tried to settle local land disputes and to reach a compromise with claim-jumpers but they "had no desire for a peaceful settlement." He was involved in a brief altercation with a claim jumper, J.M. Bannerman, whom he approached and ordered to move. The man was armed with two revolvers and refused to move, therefore McCauley and his crew jacked the shack off its foundation and sent it down the riverbank. Up on charges, they were found not guilty.

McCauley and the other members of the Committee were sued for damages by the claim jumper J.M. Bannerman, for "willful damage to property." McCauley was fined 40 dollars. Six other members of the committee were also found guilty, but being let off with court costs and an order to replace the damaged property. The Protective Association continued their vigilance in Edmonton, and claim jumpers eventually decided that the area was not the place to build on once the land in the area was surveyed by the Dominion Land Survey and the Hudson's Bay Company.

=== Edmonton School Board ===
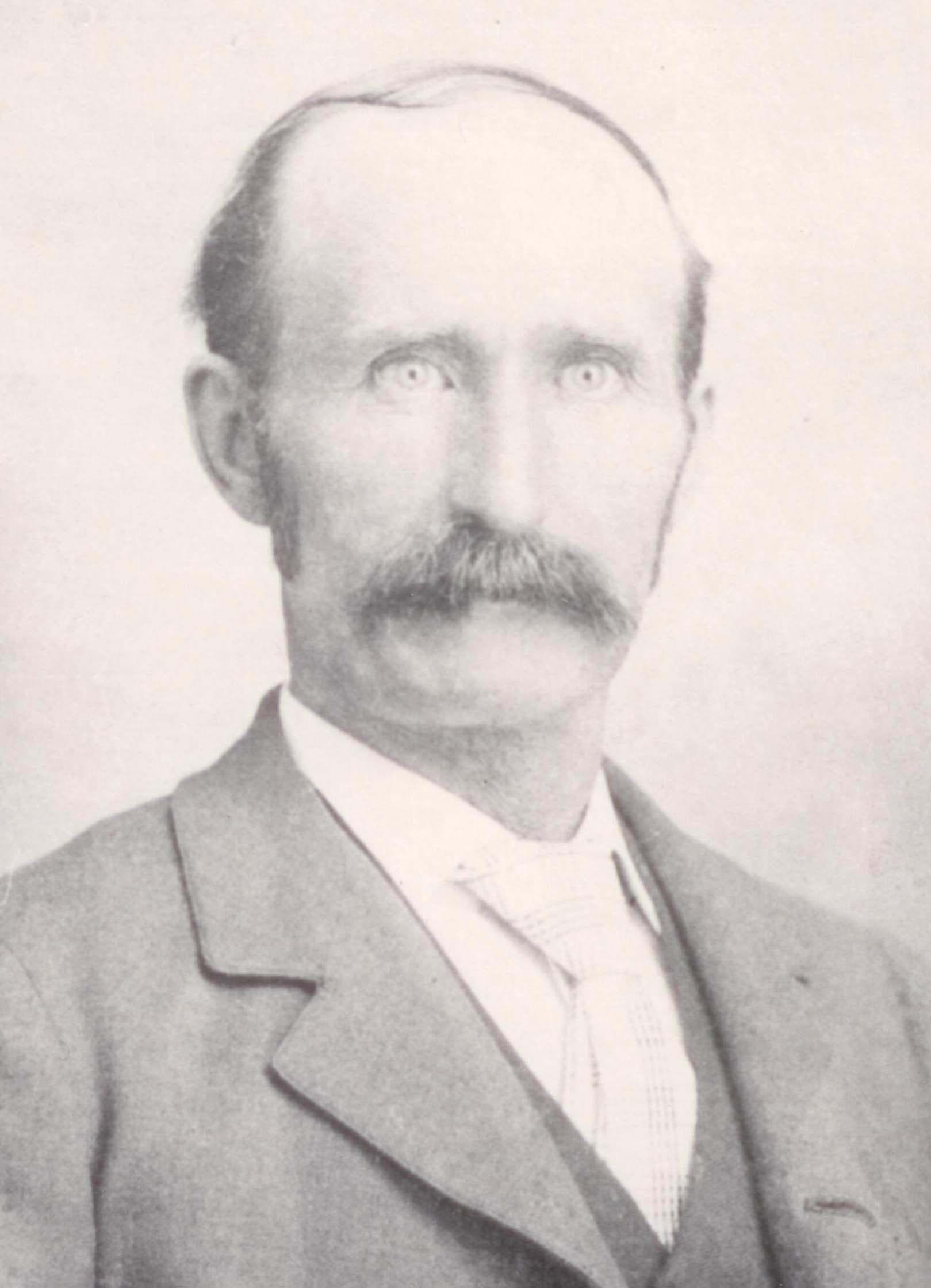
McCauley in 1910 as a member of the school board

After realizing Edmonton as a suitable place for raising his children, McCauley soon recognized the community's need for a school. McCauley led a group of prominent men and arranged for a school to be built on land donated by the Hudson's Bay Company. The school opened in on January 2, 1882. Three years after the opening of the school, McCauley found himself and a small group of people paying off bills for the school. Initially, McCauley suggested that land owners be taxed with the funds going to the school, but protest followed. McCauley then decided to propose that Edmonton be designated as an official school district by the government in Ottawa, which was voted in favor of following a close vote. The school district was successfully negotiated with Ottawa, and it became the first of its kind in the North-West Territories.

Edmonton became known as having the "finest school system in the west of Portage la Prairie" that set an example for many other following cities. McCauley served as chairman of the newly formed School Board from 1885 to 1888, when he stepped down, although he served as a trustee for 18 years following. He was nicknamed "Edmonton's Father of Education" in honour of his efforts to bring an education system to the community.

=== 1885 Riel Rebellion ===
During the Riel Rebellion in 1885, news of the Frog Lake Massacre spread to Edmonton, invoking fear in many residents. McCauley, concerned for the safety of Edmonton residents, organized a militia "Home Guard", as protection from attack until the arrival of the Alberta Field Force, led by Thomas Bland Strange, including Alberta militia-men and the Fusiliers Mont-Royal from Montreal. Edmonton did not suffer the ravages suffered by Saskatchewan centres.

== Political career ==
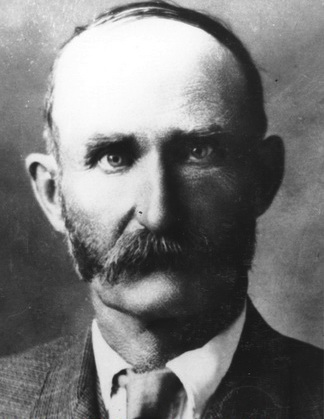
McCauley in 1905

=== Mayor of Edmonton ===
In 1889, McCauley co-founded (with Frank Oliver and John Alexander McDougall) the Edmonton Board of Trade, forerunner to the Chamber of Commerce.

After Edmonton was incorporated as a town on January 9, 1892, it held its first election. McCauley was acclaimed as mayor as no other candidates put their names forth. Among his concerns during his first term were to "establish order" among the scattered shacks near the trading post, and widening various roads around the town, in preparation for what he envisioned in the future of Edmonton becoming a "busy metropolitan".

He led the "Rat Creek Rebellion" of 1892 to prevent an important federal office moving to the rival community of South Edmonton (later City of Strathcona). The Canadian government decided to move the Dominion Land Office from Edmonton to the railway station on the south side of the North Saskatchewan River, at Strathcona, at the time a separate community. When government officials began to carry out the move, town residents armed themselves and led by McCauley and other prominent Edmontonians, including councillor John Cameron stopped it. The angry mob descended on the office, cut the horses loose and dismantled the wagon that the official was packing with records for transportation. The situation move was stopped. Mounties were summoned from Fort Saskatchewan, their nearest headquarters. McCauley took the mob of armed townspeople to the bridge over Rat Creek (on the site of today's Commonwealth Stadium). He stood off the police, and they returned to Fort Saskatchewan to request instructions. The government reversed its decision to move the office. Instead it simply opened an additional office in South Edmonton. The Mounties refused to try to enforce law and order in Edmonton for a short time after this, and the Town of Edmonton hired its own constable.

McCauley was re-elected by acclaimation in both the 1893 and 1894 elections He stepped aside voluntarily after his third term, never having been contested in an election.

In 1893, he went to Ottawa to negotiate with the federal government for the building of a bridge, to be used by a railway and a street railway system. Edmonton's streetcar system, which began operations in 1908, was the first in the west.

The federal government agreed to assist in building a railway bridge over the North Saskatchewan River needed for a rail connection between Edmonton and Calgary. The bridge's construction was finished in 1900, with the Edmonton Yukon and Pacific Railway being built to the northside in 1902.

McCauley also saw Edmonton's need for a hospital, and established what later became Grey Nuns Hospital, arranging for the Grey Nuns to establish at the town, along with a nurse.

In 1896, McCauley sought election to the Town Council, this time as alderman. He was easily elected, finishing first of eight candidates in an election in which the top six were elected (Block Voting was used in this election). He served only a single term, soon seeking a seat at the territorial level.

=== Territorial and provincial ===
In 1896, McCauley sought to be Edmonton's representative in the North-West Territories Legislature. In the 1896 election, he defeated Alexander Cameron Rutherford and was elected with official Patrons of Industry backing.

During his term as representative, he worked to upgrade Edmonton's school system, along with upgrading the town's trade and industry. McCauley was re-elected in 1898, defeating Rutherford and a third candidate, Harry H. Robertson. Credible allegations were made that the election map was gerrymandered in his favor. He served as Edmonton's member at Regina until 1902, when he was defeated by Richard Secord. During his time in office, McCauley kept his focus on his development of the school system, introducing a single tax bill intended to give school boards power to adopt the single tax as a form of property tax.

As MLA, he accompanied Peter Kropotkin when the Russian anarchist visited Edmonton in 1897.

In 1901, McCauley sold Edmonton Cartage Company and used the proceeds to buy one thousand acres (4 km²) of farmland at Beaver Lake, near Tofield, Alberta, where he farmed until returning to Edmonton in 1905. While in Tofield, he married Annie Cookson - his first wife, Matilda, had died in 1896 - with whom he had four children, bringing his total to twelve.

Upon Alberta becoming a province in 1905, McCauley returned to Edmonton and was elected as a Liberal member to the Legislative Assembly of Alberta in the riding of Vermilion in the province's first general election. During his tenure, he had introduced many bills in the house, and advocated for a provincial university to be founded.

McCauley played a vital role in Edmonton being chosen as the provincial capital. In a speech, he pointed out the ongoing development at the northern town of Peace River, Alberta, and how Edmonton would be the "logical centre of the province".

== Later career ==
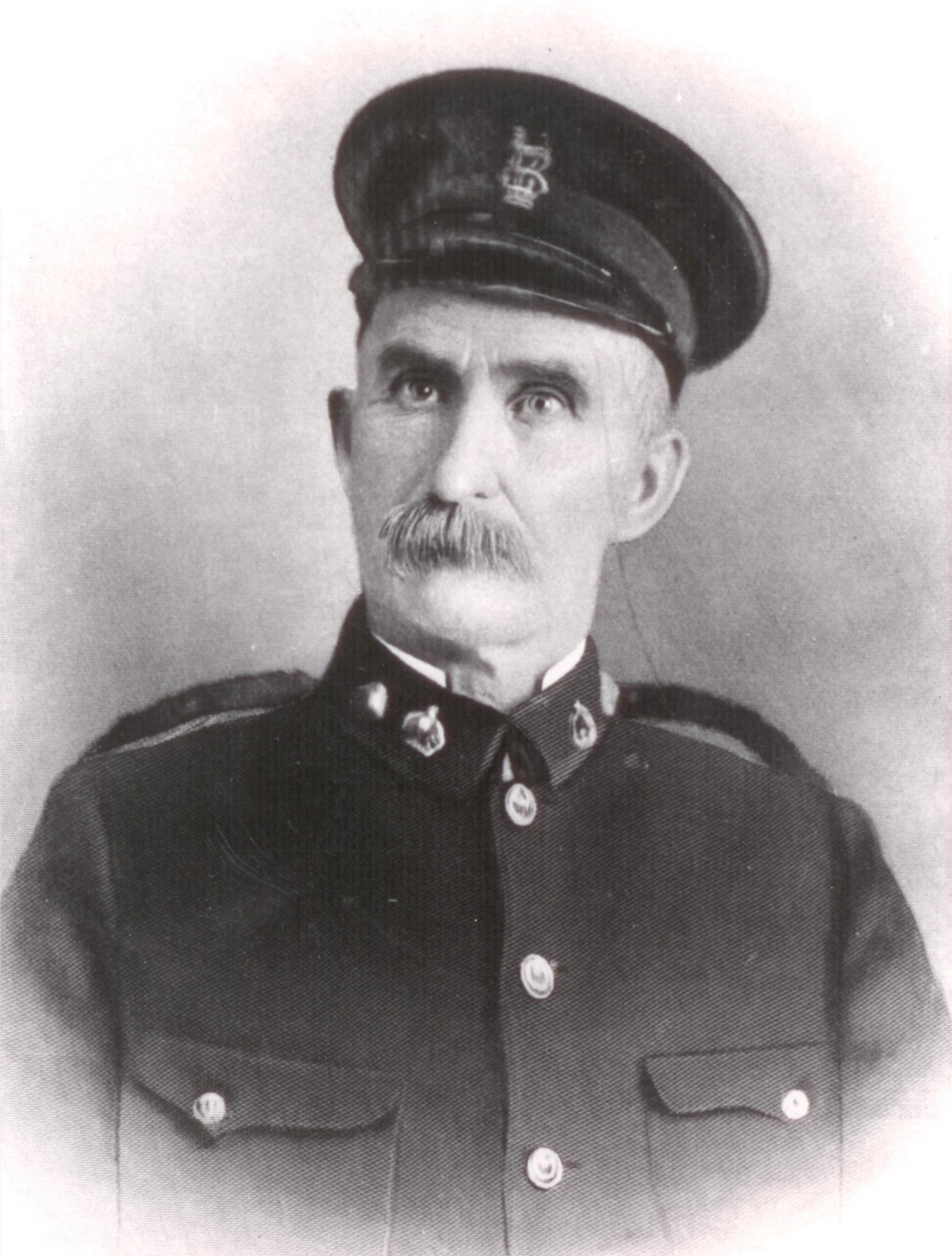
McCauley as the warden of the Edmonton Penitentiary.

McCauley resigned his seat in the Legislature in 1906, after being appointed warden of the Edmonton Penitentiary, the first of its kind in Alberta. It was said that his reputation of "honesty, fairness and ability to keep law and order" was a contributing factor in his appointment. In the years he served in the capacity, McCauley instituted a number of new practices, including creating labour jobs for prisoners, such as manufacturing bricks, concrete, clothing and tools. Prisoners were also made to garden to grow their own food. By the end of his tenure as warden, a coal mine had been put into operation, on the edge of today's downtown Edmonton. He was greatly respected by his colleagues, and it was said that "he never once had a complaint against him from either staff nor inmates."

McCauley resigned as warden in 1912 to become a fruit farmer in Penticton in the Okanagan valley. After thirteen years farming in Penticton, he moved to Sexsmith, Alberta to farm on a recently bought 1000-acre farm.

== Personal life ==
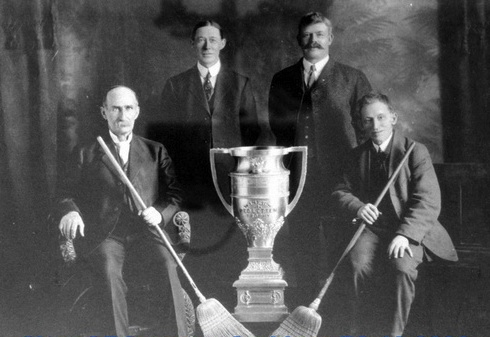
McCauley (bottom left) and curling team

McCauley married Matilda Benson of Sarnia, Ontario in 1875, in which he would remain married to until her sudden death in 1896. He married once again in 1902, to Annie Cookson, originally from Manchester, England. He had seven children with his first wife Matilda – Alexander, Lilly Bell, Margaret Alberta, Mabel, Maud, Frank and May. With Annie Cookson he had four children, Georgina, John, Raymond and Ada.

McCauley was an active member of the Edmonton community. He served as a director of the Edmonton Agricultural Association for 16 years. The association brought the Edmonton Exhibition to Edmonton, one of the prominent fairs of the west at the time. As telephone service was brought to Edmonton, McCauley was one of the first to receive one installed. His telephone number was #1. When John Hamilton-Gordon, 1st Marquess of Aberdeen and Temair would visit Edmonton for business, McCauley and his wife would usually be the ones to entertain him. Also an avid curler, McCauley was a founder of the Royal Curling Club in Edmonton and led his curling team where he served as a skip. He also enjoyed other sports, including horse carriage racing.

McCauley School was named his honour in 1912, for his work in pioneering the public school board.

== Death and legacy ==
McCauley died in Sexsmith on October 25, 1930, following a long illness. He was survived by his second wife, Annie Cookson, and 11 children and step-children. Upon learning of his death, all school flags in Edmonton were ordered to fly at half-staff. Almost 600 students from McCauley School, which was named in his honour, stood in "solemn salute". McCauley's body was brought back to Edmonton, where he was laid in state on October 30 at the First Presbyterian Church, where his funeral services were later conducted. He was interred at the Edmonton Cemetery.

McCauley was often called "Honest Matt McCauley". It was said that he "has a strong personality, high ideals and indomitable will and was generous to a fault." Edmonton's McCauley neighbourhood is named for him. What was known as McCauley Plaza was also built on the site of his home, overlooking the North Saskatchewan River. It has since however been renamed Telus Plaza.

== Bibliography ==
- Allan, Iris (June 1975). "Edmonton's First Mayor". Heritage.
- Aylen-van de Sande, Marjorie (April 3, 1992). "Matthew McCauley - Edmonton's Eminent Pioneer".
- Bolwer, Jim (Winter 1972). "Matthew McCauley". Alberta Historical Review. 20 (1): 11–17.
- Keane, Irene (January 25, 1913). "Matthew McCauley, Old Timer". Edmonton Capital.
- MacRae, Archibald Oswald (1912). History of the province of Alberta, Volume 1. Calgary, Alberta: Western Canada History Co.
- McDonald, Jac (1987). Historic Edmonton: an architectural and pictorial guide. Edmonton, Alberta: Lone Pine Publishing. ISBN 9780919433335.
- von Heyking, Amy (2005). "McCauley, Mathew". In Cook, Ramsay; Bélanger, Réal (eds.). Dictionary of Canadian Biography. Vol. XV (1921–1930) (online ed.). University of Toronto Press.
