= 97 Street =

Major road in Edmonton, Alberta

- Heroes Boulevard
- Start/End points of 97 Street
- Former name: Namayo Avenue
- Part of: Highway 28
- Maintained by: the City of Edmonton
- Length: 12.1 km (7.5 mi)
- Location: Edmonton
- South end: Jasper Avenue
- Major junctions: 107A Avenue, 111 Avenue, 118 Avenue, Yellowhead Trail, 137 Avenue, 153 Avenue, 167 Avenue, Anthony Henday Drive
- North end: City Limits

97 Street is a major arterial road in north Edmonton, Alberta. It is used to take vehicles in and out of Downtown Edmonton to the city's northern suburban neighbourhoods and to the region's main military installation, CFB Edmonton. North of Anthony Henday Drive (Highway 216), it is designated as part of Highway 28.

The road has existed in some form since Edmonton was a small agricultural community. At its southern terminus it connects with Jasper Avenue, early Edmonton's main street, at the location of the Edmonton Convention Centre and Canada Place the main federal government offices in Alberta since 1988 and the former site of the Alberta Hotel. Proceeding north, 97 Street passes the Francis Winspear Centre for Music, and the Law Courts, as well as the Chinatown gate in Chinatown and Little Italy. Like all early roads in eastern Edmonton, Namayo Avenue as it was called, ran at a slight angle to a true north–south line, being more NNW-SSE. During later development (north of 110A Avenue) it switches to a straight north–south course.

The neighbourhood along the west side, between 137 and 153 Avenues, Griesbach, used to be designated for homes for the families of the base. This has since been redeveloped by the Canada Lands Company. 97 Street is still used as the Canadian Forces parade to the base upon return of duty of the troops. A portion of 97 street between 137 Avenue and Anthony Henday Drive has been given the honorary name, " Canadian Forces Trail" and was approved in 2018, the proposal submitted by Ward 3 City Councillor Jon Dziadyk. This has prompted the light standards being tied with yellow ribbons and the street nicknamed Heroes Boulevard. This honorary name was the idea of local dentist Randy Crowell as a tribute to all past and present members of Edmontons' military family. 10,000 names were gathered through radio media outlets and presented to City Hall in support of the Heroes Boulevard tribute.

== Neighbourhoods ==
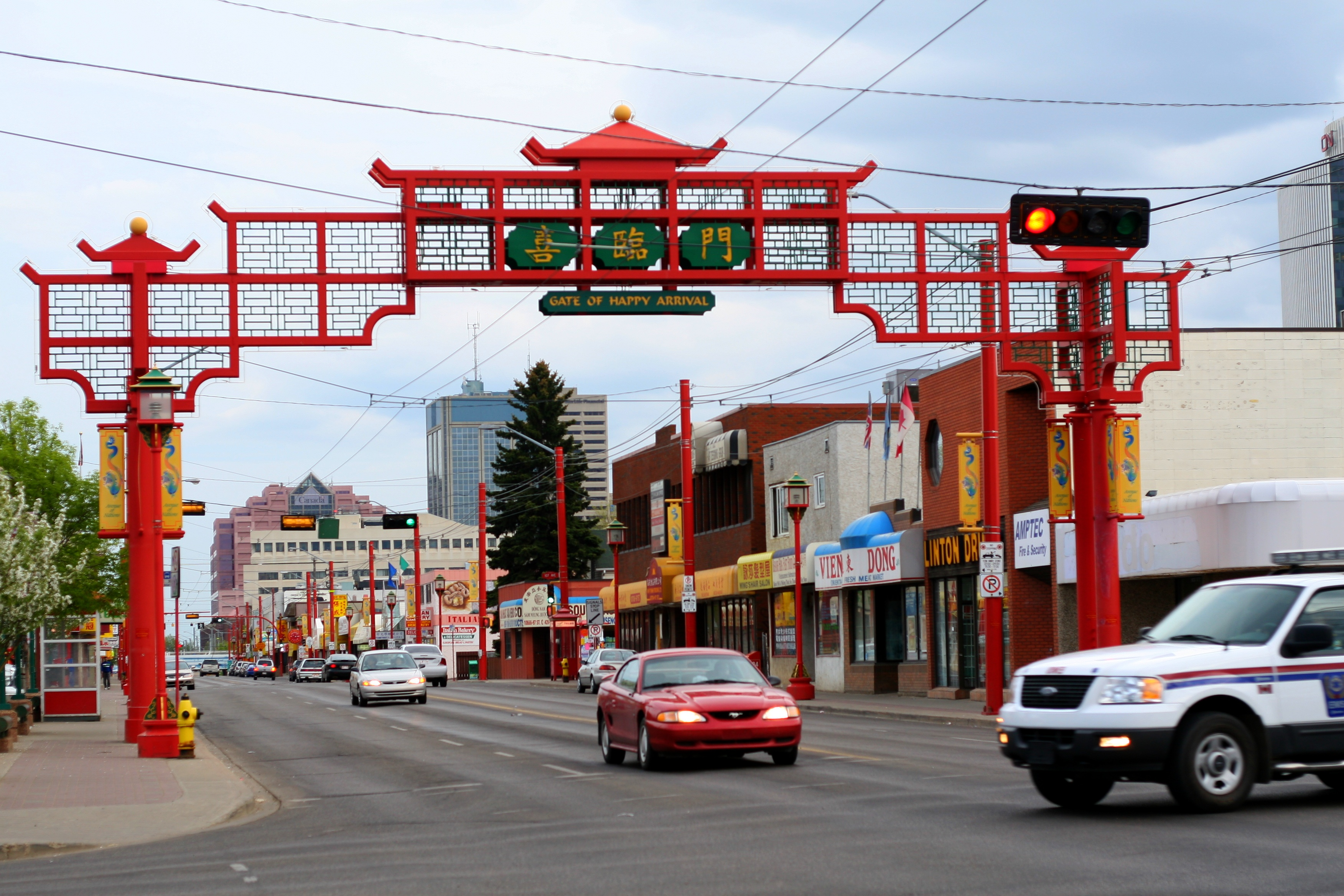
Gate of Happy Arrival over 97 Street, just south of 107A Avenue.

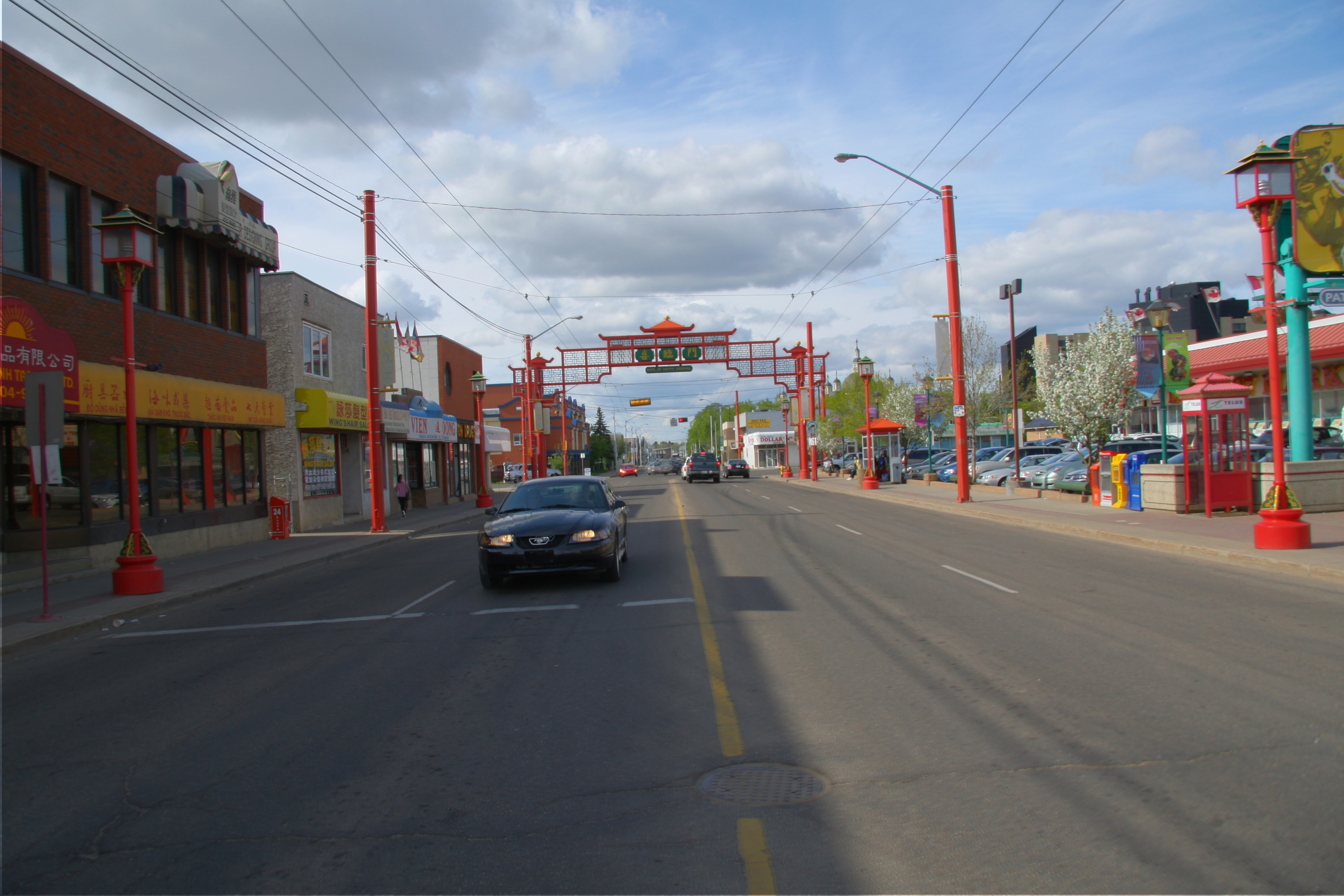
97 Street passing through Chinatown.

List of neighbourhoods 94 street in order from south to north.

- Boyle Street
- Central McDougall
- McCauley
- Spruce Avenue
- Alberta Avenue
- Westwood
- Delton
- Killarney
- Lauderdale
- Glengarry
- Rosslyn
- Northmount
- Griesbach
- Evansdale
- Beaumaris
- Eaux Claires
- Lorelei
- Baturyn
- Lago Lindo
- Elsinore

== Major intersections ==
This is a list of major intersections, starting at the south end of 97 Street. The entire route is in Edmonton.

km	mi	Destinations	Notes
0.0	0.0	Jasper Avenue	Near Shaw Conference Centre and Canada Place
0.5	0.31	103A Avenue	
1.2	0.75	107A Avenue (Avenue of Nations)	
1.9	1.2	111 Avenue (Norwood Boulevard)	
3.2	2.0	118 (Alberta) Avenue	To Northern Alberta Institute of Technology
3.2	2.0	South end of Lane control (3 reversible lanes)	
4.4	2.7	Yellowhead Trail (Highway 16)	Single-point urban interchange (traffic lights); Highway 16 exit 389; former Highway 28 southern terminus
4.8	3.0	127 Avenue	At-grade (traffic lights); quadrant roadway via 101 St & 128 Ave
4.8	3.0	North end of Lane control (3 reversible lanes)	
6.4	4.0	137 Avenue	Passes Northgate Centre and North Town Centre
8.1	5.0	153 Avenue	
9.7	6.0	Castle Downs Road / 167 Avenue	
11.7	7.3	Anthony Henday Drive (Highway 216); Highway 28 begins	Partial cloverleaf interchange (traffic lights); Highway 216 exit 39; Highway 28 southern terminus
12.1	7.5	Highway 28 north – Cold Lake, Fort McMurray	Edmonton city limits; continues into Sturgeon County
1.000 mi = 1.609 km; 1.000 km = 0.621 mi: Concurrency terminus; Route transition

== See also ==
- List of streets in Edmonton
- Transportation in Edmonton
