= 1907 Edmonton municipal election =

Municipal election in Alberta, Canada

The 1907 municipal election was held on December 9, 1907, for the purpose of electing a mayor and five aldermen to sit on the Edmonton City Council, Alberta, Canada as well as five public school trustees and six separate school trustees. There were also four proposed bylaws put to a vote of the electorate concurrently with the election.

== Positions to be elected ==
There were eight aldermen on city council, but three of the positions were already filled: Cameron Anderson, Wilfrid Gariépy and James Walker had been elected to two-year terms in 1906, and were still in office. (Soon after the election, James Walker resigned, and the resulting by-election, held on December 30, 1907, elected D.R. Fraser.)

Alderman Morton MacAuley had resigned in October 1907, and G.M. Manual won the resulting by-election, held on August 26, 1907. His term ended in December 1907.

Thomas Daly had been elected to a two-year term in 1906 but had resigned.

Accordingly, five seats were filled in this election by plurality. The four most-popular were elected to two year terms. The fifth-place aldermanic candidate - Herman McInnis - was elected to serve out the remaining year of Daly's term.

in the mayor's election, each voter had just one vote. In the aldermanic elections each voter could cast up to five votes. The 1221 voters who voted in this election cast 6000 votes in the aldermanic contest.

In early November, three incumbent aldermen - G.M. Manual, S.H. Smith and R.J. Manson - said they would not run for re-election, citing demands of business and other duties. Daly said he would resign partway through his term. Picard said he would not run for his aldermanic seat but instead for mayor. One pundit despaired about the dearth of experience expected in the new council. Manson later changed his mind and ran for re-election, to receive the most votes of any aldermanic candidate.

== Mayoral nominations ==
The candidates for mayor were former mayor John Alexander McDougall and incumbent councillor Joseph Henri Picard. McDougall was nominated by William Short, Arthur Cushing, J C Dowsett, W R West, A E Jackson, and J W Huff. Picard was nominated by William Antrobus Griesbach, Thomas Bellamy, George Manuel, William Thomas Henry, W J Graves, T P Hobson, and G K Allen.

== Campaign ==
The election showed some signs of nastiness, as an anonymous letter (signed by a Mr. "Graybrook") attacking mayoral candidate McDougall was published in the Edmonton Journal. The letter accused McDougall of demanding an unfairly inflated price for land the city intended to buy from him, and of making pledges to reduce municipal taxes without being sufficiently familiar with the city's financial situation. The letter's writer was eventually exposed as being incumbent mayor William Antrobus Griesbach, who was not seeking re-election but who was supporting McDougall's opponent, Picard.

== Endorsements ==
The East End Ratepayers' Association endorsed George S. Armstrong, John Galbraith, William Clegg, and Isaac Lane for election as aldermen. All four men had signed on to the association's platform, which included

- allowing non-property owners (tenants) to vote in elections, although not on money bylaws;
- stricter supervision of the city's sanitary standards;
- more widely distributed and more easily understood city financial statements;
- allowing a majority of a district's residents to petition for improvements to the district, preventing non-residents from having a veto over such improvements;
- the insertion of a fair wage clause into all city contracts;
- opposition to inflation of assessment of property values [to reduce property taxes imposed on property owner]; and
- public ownership of all utilities, except as otherwise decided by a popular vote.

(John Galbraith was the author of the 1897 utopian futuristic novel In the New Capital.)

== Voter turnout ==
A total of 1679 ballots were cast in the 1907 municipal election. The number of eligible voters is no longer available, but the Edmonton Bulletin noted on the day of the election that "both Mssrs. McDougall and Picard have excellent organizations, and almost every available vote is being brought in." It further asserted that the city's two polling stations were inadequate, and that the new council should create additional polling stations.

== Electoral system ==
The mayor was elected through first-past-the-post voting.

The aldermen and school board trustees were elected through plurality block voting.

== Results ==
(bold indicates elected, italics indicate incumbent)

=== Mayor ===
- **John Alexander McDougall** - 1217
- Joseph Henri Picard - 437

=== Aldermen ===
- **Robert Manson** - 783
- **George S. Armstrong** - 774 (only member of East End ticket to be elected)
- **Thomas Bellamy** - 736
- **Robert Lee** - 696
- **Herman McInnes** - 674
- D.R. Fraser - 614
- E B Edwards - 565
- William Clegg - 425 East End ticket
- John Galbraith - 399 East End ticket
- John Calhoun - 378
- Isaac Lane - 372 East End ticket
- Cornelius Gallagher - 302
- W.S. Weeks - 181
- H D Johnson - 51

=== Public school trustees ===
A Butchart, W D Ferris, H A Gray, A E May, and Alex Taylor were elected. Detailed results are no longer available.

=== Separate (Catholic) school trustees ===
Wilfrid Gariépy, E J Hart, Prosper-Edmond Lessard, Joseph Henri Picard, S Schultz, and O Tessier were elected. Detailed results are no longer available.

=== Bylaws ===
The following bylaws were voted on concurrently with the 1907 election:

==== Bylaw 153 ====
A bylaw to authorize an agreement between the Municipality and American Oil Co.

- For: 1,208
- Against: 643

==== Bylaw 112 ====
A bylaw to grant Cyrus S. Eaton and Matt E. Springer a special franchise.

- For: 973
- Against: 247

==== Bylaw 111 ====
A bylaw to grant N.W. Gas and Co. a special franchise.

- For: 325
- Against: 670

==== Bylaw 105 ====
A bylaw to raise the sum of $50,000 to be paid to City Hospital by way of a bonus.

- For: 1,083
- Against: 124
