= Dickinsfield, Edmonton =

Dickinsfield
- Area
- Location of Dickinsfield in Edmonton
- Coordinates: 53.608°N 113.478°W
- Country: Canada
- Province: Alberta
- City: Edmonton
- Quadrant: NW
- Ward: tastawiyiniwak

Government
  - Administrative body: Edmonton City Council
  - Councillors: Karen Principe
- Elevation: 680 m (2,230 ft)

Dickinsfield is a residential area in northeast Edmonton, Alberta, Canada that consists of the neighbourhoods of Evansdale and Northmount.

The area, the Dickinsfield Junior High School, and the Dickinsfield Extended Care Centre are all named after aviator Clennell Haggerston "Punch" Dickins. Dickins was the first pilot inducted into the Canada's Aviation Hall of Fame.

== Geography ==
Located in northeast Edmonton, the Dickinsfield area is bounded by 97 Street (Highway 28) to the west, 137 Avenue to the south, 82 Street to the east, and 153 Avenue to the north. The area is bisected by 144 Avenue. Evansdale comprises the part of the area north of 144 Avenue, while Northmount comprises the balance to the south of 144 Avenue. Access to Edmonton's downtown to the south and CFB Edmonton to the north is available by 97 Street.

The Londonderry area is located beyond 82 Street to the east, while the Lake District (Edmonton North) area is beyond 153 Avenue to the north. The Griesbach neighbourhood is located across 97 Street to the west, while the Glengarry neighbourhood is across 137 Avenue to the south.

== Housing ==
Housing in both neighbourhoods is predominantly single-family dwellings with just over half (54%) of the homes in Evansdale and seven out of ten (69%) of the homes in Northmount being of this type. Evansdale has a significant portion of residences (24%) in walk-up apartment buildings, while approximately one in five residences (20%) in both neighbourhoods are row houses.

Housing Type	Evansdale	Northmount	Dickinsfield
Apartments With Five Or More Stories	0%	0%	0%
Apartments With Fewer Than Five Stories	24%	2%	16%
Duplexes	3%	0%	2%
Rooming Houses	0%	7%	3%
Row Houses	19%	21%	20%
Single Family Dwelling	54%	69%	60%
Total	100%	100%	100%

== Schools ==
There are six schools operated by Edmonton Public Schools and Edmonton Catholic Schools in Dickinsfield, three in Evansdale and three in Northmount. Two are junior high schools and four are elementary schools. In addition, there are two other educational facilities located in Dickinsfield Mall.

Schools in Evansdale

- Edmonton Public Schools
  - Evansdale Elementary School
- Edmonton Catholic Schools
  - Cardinal Leger Catholic Junior High School
  - St. Philip Catholic Elementary School

Schools in Northmount

- Edmonton Public Schools
  - Dickinsfield Junior High School
  - Northmount Elementary School
- Edmonton Catholic Schools
  - St. Anne Catholic Elementary School

== Shopping ==
There are two shopping malls in Dickinsfield. One is the Dickinsfield Mall. The other is North Town Centre, located at the southwest corner of Northmount. Immediately across 137 Avenue from the North Town Centre is Northgate Centre. The Northgate Transit Centre is located next to North Town Mall on the north side of 137 Avenue.

== Amenities ==
Parks within Evansdale include Evansdale Park and St. Olga Park, while Northmount Park is located within Northmount.

== Health care services ==
The Dickinsfield Extended Care Hospital is located in the Northmount neighbourhood.
