= Mayliewan, Edmonton =

Mayliewan
- Neighbourhood
- Location of Mayliewan in Edmonton
- Coordinates: 53.623°N 113.461°W
- Country: Canada
- Province: Alberta
- City: Edmonton
- Quadrant: NW
- Ward: tastawiyiniwak
- Sector: North
- Area: Lake District

Government
  - Administrative body: Edmonton City Council
  - Councillor: Karen Principe

Area
  - Total: 1.19 km^{2} (0.46 sq mi)
- Elevation: 686 m (2,251 ft)

Population (2012)
  - Total: 4,206
  - Density: 3,534.5/km^{2} (9,154/sq mi)
  - Change (2009–12): ▼−1.5%
  - Dwellings: 1,279

Mayliewan is a neighbourhood in northeast Edmonton, Alberta, Canada. Subdivision and development of the neighbourhood are guided by the Mayliewan Neighbourhood Structure Plan (NSP).

It is located within Edmonton's Lake District and was originally considered Neighbourhood 7 within the Edmonton North Area Structure Plan (ASP).

Mayliewan is bounded by the Belle Rive neighbourhood across 82 Street to the west, the Schonsee neighbourhood across 167 Avenue to the north, the Ozerna neighbourhood to the east, and the Kilkenny neighbourhood across 153 Avenue to the south.

== Demographics ==
In the City of Edmonton's 2012 municipal census, Mayliewan had a population of 4,206 living in 1,279 dwellings, a -1.5% change from its 2009 population of 4,272. With a land area of 1.19 km^{2} (0.46 sq mi), it had a population density of 3,534.5 people/km^{2} in 2012.

== Housing ==
In 2005, Mayliewan's housing breakdown consisted of 97% single-family dwellings and 3% duplexes.

== Education ==
The St. John Bosco Elementary School, operated by Edmonton Catholic Schools, is located in Mayliewan.
