= Charles May (Canadian politician) =

Canadian politician (1858–1932)

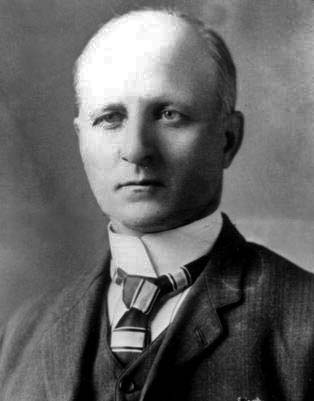

8th Mayor of Edmonton
- In office December 11, 1905 – December 10, 1906
- Preceded by: Kenneth W. MacKenzie
- Succeeded by: William Antrobus Griesbach

Alderman on the Edmonton City Council^{[n]}
- In office December 14, 1903 – December 11, 1905

Personal details
- Born: June 30, 1858 Wellington County, Province of Canada
- Died: March 1, 1932 (aged 73) Vancouver, British Columbia, Canada
- Spouses: Ann Galbraith (m. 1882; died 1897) Margaret Henderson (m. 1901)
- Profession: Carpenter, contractor
- ^[n]Known as the Edmonton Town Council from 1903 to 1904

Charles May (June 30, 1858 – March 1, 1932) was a Canadian contractor and politician. He served on the Edmonton City Council and later as Mayor of Edmonton from 1905 to 1906.

A native of what later became the province of Ontario, May moved to Manitoba soon after completing education in his hometown. In Manitoba, he briefly took to farming, before entering into the construction industry, which he established prominence in. After doing work for the railway, he moved to Winnipeg where he joined a contracting firm and become involved in the construction of many buildings. After moving west and living briefly in Carberry, Manitoba, May came to Edmonton in 1902.

In Edmonton, he rose to become one of the city's most prominent contractors, constructing many of the city's landmark buildings, as well as houses for its prominent residents. Long interested in municipal affairs, he entered civic politics with his election to the Edmonton Town Council in 1903. After an aldermanic term that saw the inclusion of Alberta as a province in Canada, in 1905 he was elected as mayor of the newly incorporated city; during his term he oversaw many improvements and advances to the city. Retiring after one term in office and returning to his contracting firm, he eventually left Edmonton in 1922 for Vancouver, where he lived for 10 years leading up to his death in 1932. An active community man, May also founded and oversaw many local organizations. A Liberal in politics, he is remembered as a progressive mayor whose policies helped the accelerate development of city of Edmonton.

== Early life and career ==
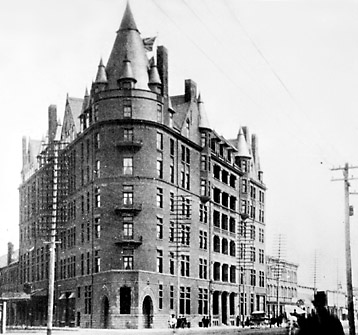
The Manitoba Hotel in Winnipeg, prior to its destruction in an 1899 fire

May was born in Wellington County, Canada West in 1858, to John and Helen (née Esson) May. Both of his parents were immigrants who had come to Canada early in their lives, his father originally from County Londonderry, Ireland, was a veteran of the 1837 Upper Canada Rebellion, and his mother a native of Aberdeenshire, Scotland. Charles attended and completed public schooling in Wellington County, and around 1871 the May family relocated to Paisley, Ontario. Upon the death of his father shortly thereafter, May was tasked with the responsibilities of heading and providing for his family, along with a brother, Thomas.

In 1880, after the closing of his father's estate and sale his father's property, he moved west to homestead and farm at Manitoba, in the Little Saskatchewan district, near Minnedosa. A few years later, he had come to the realization that farming was not an efficient means of business for him; his farm had been situated in an area that was so far removed from a town that travel to deliver his products had been cumbersome. He then gained employment as a carpenter and builder with the Manitoba and North Western Railway, where he was tasked with building rail bridges and stations. He later moved to Winnipeg, where he continued working in his field. He joined the contracting firm of Murray & McDermot, serving as foreman on various projects, including the building of the Manitoba Hotel. After some 13 years, he went to Carberry, Manitoba where he continued contracting, this time also entering the furniture business. In 1902, he was also involved in the construction of the Union Bank building there.

== Career in Edmonton ==
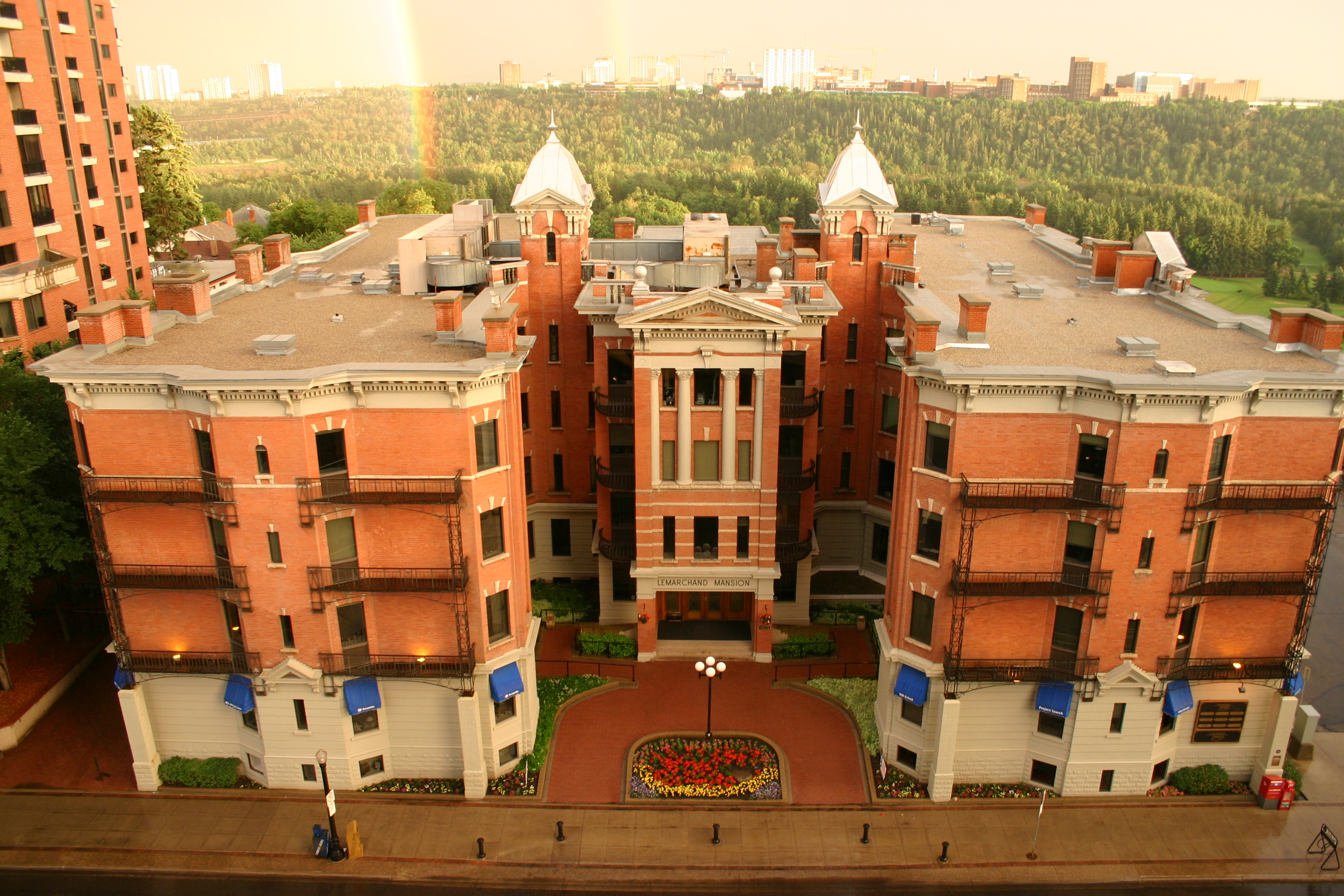
The LeMarchand Mansion in Edmonton, which May's firm was involved in the construction of in the late 1910s

Later in 1902, May once again moved, this time further west to the town of Edmonton, in the North-West Territory. Upon his arrival there, he purchased several lots of land on which constructed a series of cottages, houses and terraces that he later sold. In Edmonton, he established himself as a prominent contractor, building many notable early buildings of the town, and later city. He partnered with Charles W. Sharpe and established the May-Sharpe Construction company. With his firm, buildings he was involved in constructing included the town's first Canadian Northern Railway station, a post office, the Bank of Montreal, Merchants' Bank and Bank of Commerce buildings, the Hudson's Bay Company store, the first provincial penitentiary building, and the residences of city notables Richard Secord, Frank Oliver and Edward Ainslie Braithwaite. He was also involved in the construction of the Clover Bar railway bridge, for which he set the concrete piers and foundation, as well as the Land Titles Building in Regina, Saskatchewan. From 1909 to 1912, May also constructed the still-standing LeMarchand mansion, atop the North Saskatchewan River Valley as well as assist in the construction of McDougall United Church. The LeMarchand mansion construction however bankrupted him and forced him to move to a cottage on Koney Island on Cooking Lake, beside the present day Edmonton/Cooking Lake Water Aerodrome in Strathcona County, until his debts were settled. In 1921, he did work at Fort Smith, Northwest Territories, as superintendent of the Windsor Transportation Company.

=== Civic politics ===
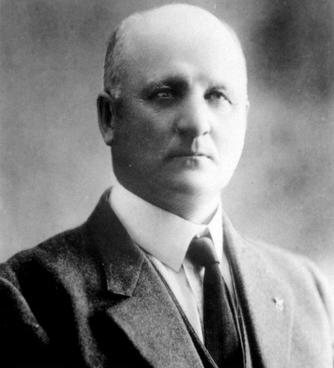
Charles May, undated

Keenly interested in the well-being of citizens and affairs related to the development of the growing town, he was nominated for and eventually elected to Edmonton Town Council as an alderman in 1903, finishing first of nine candidates, with 421 votes. His term was to last two years, but was truncated by a year by Edmonton's incorporation as a city, which meant that the entire city council was elected afresh in the 1904 election. In that election he was again elected to a two-year term, finishing first of seventeen candidates, but this time resigned one year into his term in order to run for mayor in the 1905 election. May's time on council included the time in which Alberta was incorporated as a province; as an alderman he voiced his support for a lavish celebration to be in Edmonton, which was to be the capital city of the new province. While sitting on council, he also voted against a proposed bylaw that would have permitted suffrage for women in civic elections; he had initially voted in favour of the law, but had later reconsidered and reversed his vote, effectively killing the bill. The vote previously had been in favour of the bill, by a margin of one vote.

As the popular choice leading into the election, he handily defeated fellow councillor Arthur Cushing by a count of 627 votes to 355, and thus became mayor of Edmonton. He served in this capacity for one term of one year, but did not seek re-election in 1906 and retired from political life thereafter. It was during May's term as mayor in which the municipal foundations of Edmonton were set; he oversaw the purchase of the road maintenance equipment, the city's first telephone system as well as the upgrade of the street car system to steel rails and posts, purchase of land for municipal use, paving of roads, and negotiations for the establishment of a manufacturing plant in the city. He also travelled to Toronto to lobby for a new union railway station in Edmonton to be constructed for use by the Grand Trunk, Canadian Northern and Canadian Pacific Railways. It was also during May's term which the Alberta Legislature Building first opened its doors, and he participated in its opening ceremonies. In 1911, he was named a returning officer for Edmonton, in charge of overseeing the 1911 Canadian federal election.

== Personal life ==
May was active with the Masonic Order, the Presbyterian Church, and the Liberal Party of Alberta. He also was a member of the Edmonton Exhibition Association, Old Timers' Association as well as a director and manager with the Alberta Lumber Company, founder and president of the Edmonton Kennel Club, and one of the founders of a local contractors' association. In 1906, May was involved in the planning of the first provincial fair in Alberta. May married Ann Galbraith at Saugeen, Ontario in 1882; they had two children and remained married until she died suddenly in 1897. He remarried in 1901, to Margaret Henderson with whom he had three additional children. One son, Norman was killed in an accident while working on the Grand Trunk Railway in Wolf Creek, Alberta.

Charles May was also the uncle of famed aviator and flying ace Wop May, the latter being a son of his brother, Alexander Esson May. Alexander May was a former mayor of Carberry, Manitoba, postmaster of Edmonton, as well as an unsuccessful Liberal Candidate in the 1917 Canadian federal election, in the riding of Edmonton East.

=== Death and legacy ===
He moved to Vancouver, British Columbia in 1922, and following a long period of illness, he died of stomach cancer there on March 1, 1932, aged 73. He was survived by his wife, a daughter and four sons. Margeret May later died in 1949. Regarded as a progressive and energetic mayor, upon his death, the Edmonton Bulletin noted regarding his mayoral term that "his progressive and constructive policies did much to advance the progress of Edmonton". The 1912 publication, History of the province of Alberta, praised May's stern and ambitious personality, stating that "in the most adverse circumstances [he] endured with fortitude".

== Bibliography ==
- MacRae, Archibald Oswald (1912), History of the province of Alberta, vol. 2, Calgary, Alberta: Western Canada History Co
