= Castle Downs, Edmonton =

Castle Downs
- Area
- Location of Castle Downs in Edmonton
- Coordinates: 53.625°N 113.517°W
- Country: Canada
- Province: Alberta
- City: Edmonton
- Quadrant: NW
- Ward: Anirniq & tastawiyiniwak

Government
  - Administrative body: Edmonton City Council
  - Councillors: Erin Rutherford & Karen Principe
- Elevation: 683 m (2,241 ft)

Population
  - Total: 42,162

Castle Downs is a residential area in the northwest portion of the City of Edmonton in Alberta, Canada. The area was originally to be called Athabasca Downs, but when the city rejected the name, the developer used their second choice: Castle Downs. The names of the communities were based on European castles, and Castle Downs became the first area in Edmonton to be named in a thematic way. According to former Names Committee secretary Nancy Diettrich “The castles were chosen to recognize the different ethnic groups in the area.” It was originally established in 1971 through Edmonton City Council's adoption of the Castle Downs Outline Plan, and then extended northward in 1983 through the adoption of the Caste Downs Extension Area Structure Plan. Combined, these two plans guide the overall development of the area.

== Geography ==
Located in northwest Edmonton, the Castle Downs area is bounded by 127 Street to the west and Anthony Henday Drive (Highway 216) to the north. On the east, it is bounded by 97 Street (Highway 28) to the north of 153 Avenue and Castle Downs Road (113A Street) to the south of 153 Avenue. On the south, it is bounded by 137 Avenue to the west of Castle Downs Road and 153 Avenue to the east of Castle Downs Road. The area is also bisected by 167 Avenue and 112 Street.

The Griesbach neighbourhood is located east of Castle Downs Road and south of 153 Avenue to the southeast. The Lake District (Edmonton North) area is located beyond 97 Street to the east, while the Kensington neighbourhood is beyond 137 Avenue to the south. The Palisades area is located across 127 Street to the west, while the future Goodridge Corners neighbourhood is beyond Anthony Henday Drive to the northwest. Sturgeon County is located beyond Goodridge Corners to the northwest and 1.2 km (0.75 mi) beyond Anthony Henday Drive to the north.

== Neighbourhoods ==
The Castle Downs Outline Plan and the Castle Downs Extension Area Structure Plan originally planned for a combined 10 separate residential neighbourhoods. Today, Castle Downs includes the following 11 neighbourhoods:

- Baranow;
- Baturyn;
- Beaumaris;
- Caernarvon;
- Canossa;
- Carlisle;
- Chambery;
- Dunluce;
- Elsinore;
- Lorelei; and
- Rapperswill.

== Land use plans ==
In addition to the Castle Downs Outline Plan and the Castle Downs Extension Area Structure Plan, the following plans were adopted to further guide development of certain portions of the Castle Downs area:

- the Castle Downs Outline Plan (Baranow Area) in 1977, which applies to the Baranow neighbourhood and portions of Caernarvon, Carlisle and Dunluce;
- the Canossa Neighbourhood Structure Plan (NSP) in 1984, which applies to the Canossa neighbourhood;
- the Chambery NSP in 1985, which applies to the Chambery neighbourhood;
- the Elsinore NSP in 1985, which applies to the Elsinore neighbourhood; and
- the Rapperswill NSP in 2010, which applies to the Rapperswill neighbourhood.

== Castle Downs Transit Centre ==
Castle Downs Transit Centre
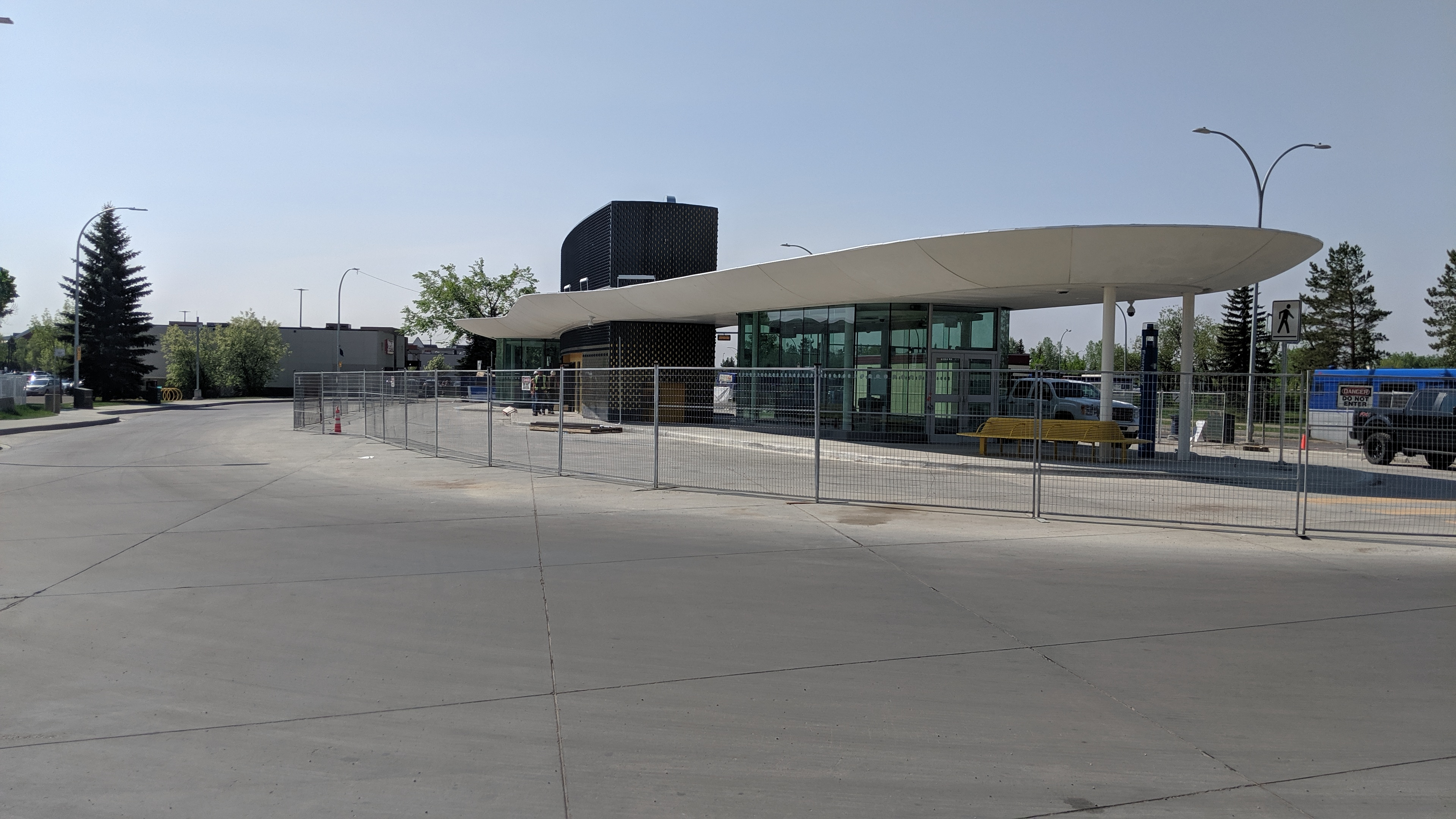
- Castle downs under construction in 2019

General information
- Location: Canada
- System: ETS
- Operator: City of edmonton
- Transit authority: Edmonton transit service
- Platforms: 11 bus bays
- Tram routes: Metro line (future)

Construction
- Structure type: At-grade
- Parking: No
- Cycle facilities: Yes
- Accessible: Yes

Other information
- Website: Castle Downs Transit Centre

History
- Opened: 1981
- Rebuilt: 2019
- Electrified: 2019
Location

The Castle Downs Transit Centre is located on 153 Avenue and Castle Downs Road. Amenities at this transit centre include bike racks, a large shelter and washrooms. There are no vending machines, or park and ride available at this transit centre.

The transit centre underwent an overhaul, completed in July 2019, as part of a citywide $37.75 million transit centre improvement project. The federal government provided $4.86 million in funding for the Castle Downs Transit Centre renewal project.

The following bus routes serve the transit centre:

To/From	Routes
Calder	51, 103
Canossa	112
Carlton	109
Downtown	150X
Eaux Claires Transit Centre	103, 124
Government Centre Transit Centre	150X
Griesbach	109
Northgate Transit Centre	109, 127
Rapperswill	112
University Transit Centre	51
Westmount Transit Centre	51

== Surrounding areas ==
Griesbach

Lake District

The Palisades

Kensington
