= Rosslyn, Edmonton =

Rosslyn
- Neighbourhood
- Location of Rosslyn in Edmonton
- Coordinates: 53.596°N 113.500°W
- Country: Canada
- Province: Alberta
- City: Edmonton
- Quadrant: NW
- Ward: Anirniq
- Sector: Mature area

Government
  - Administrative body: Edmonton City Council
  - Councillor: Erin Rutherford

Area
  - Total: 1.34 km^{2} (0.52 sq mi)
- Elevation: 677 m (2,221 ft)

Population (2012)
  - Total: 2,902
  - Density: 2,165.7/km^{2} (5,609/sq mi)
  - Change (2009–12): ▼−0.2%
  - Dwellings: 1,388

Rosslyn is a residential neighbourhood in north west Edmonton, Alberta, Canada. The neighbourhood has good access to shopping services at Northgate Centre and North Town Mall.

The neighbourhood is bounded on the north by 137 Avenue, on the east by 97 Street, on the south by 132 Avenue and on the west by 113 A Street. Travel south along 97 Street provides direct access to the downtown core and to the Northern Alberta Institute of Technology. Travel north along 97 Street provides access to CFB Edmonton.

The community is represented by the Rosslyn Community League, established in 1961, which maintains a community hall and outdoor rink located at 110 Street and 134 Avenue.

== Demographics ==
In the City of Edmonton's 2012 municipal census, Rosslyn had a population of 2,902 living in 1,388 dwellings, a -0.2% change from its 2009 population of 2,907. With a land area of 1.34 km^{2} (0.52 sq mi), it had a population density of 2,165.7 people/km^{2} in 2012.

== Residential development ==
According to the 2001 federal census, substantially all of the residential development in the neighbourhood occurred between the end of World War II and 1980. One in three residences (32.7%) were built between 1946 and 1960. Just over half (52%) of the residences were built during the 1960s. Most of the remaining residences (12.1% or one in eight) were built during the 1970s.

The most common type of residence in the neighbourhood, according to the 2005 municipal census, is the single-family dwelling. These account for roughly three out of every four (73%) of all residences in the neighbourhood. Rented apartments in low-rise buildings and duplexes each account one residence in ten (11% for apartments and 11% for duplexes). The remaining five percent of residences are row houses. Three out of four (74%) of residences are owner occupies while only one residence in four (26%) are rented.

== Schools ==
There are three schools in the neighbourhood.

The Scott Robertson Elementary School and the Rosslyn Junior High School are both operated by the Edmonton Public School System.

The other school is the Choice For Change Junior Senior High School.

== See also ==
- Edmonton Federation of Community Leagues
