= Cameron Anderson =

Cameron Anderson may refer to:

- Cameron Anderson (politician)
- Cameron Anderson (rugby union)
