= Lauderdale, Edmonton =

Lauderdale
- Neighbourhood
- Location of Lauderdale in Edmonton
- Coordinates: 53.588°N 113.505°W
- Country: Canada
- Province: Alberta
- City: Edmonton
- Quadrant: NW
- Ward: Anirniq
- Sector: Mature area

Government
  - Administrative body: Edmonton City Council
  - Councillor: Erin Rutherford

Area
  - Total: 1.3 km^{2} (0.50 sq mi)
- Elevation: 674 m (2,211 ft)

Population (2012)
  - Total: 2,733
  - Density: 2,102.3/km^{2} (5,445/sq mi)
  - Change (2009–12): ▼−4.9%
  - Dwellings: 1,333

Lauderdale is a residential neighbourhood in north west Edmonton, Alberta, Canada. It is named for "James Lauder who farmed and owned land near the neighbourhood before the turn of the 20th century".

The neighbourhood is bounded on the east by 97 Street, on the west by 113 A Street, on the north by 132 Avenue, and on the south by 127 Avenue. Shopping services at Northgate Centre and North Town Mall are located just to the north along 97 Street. Access to CFB Edmonton to the north is also provided by 97 Street. Travel south along 97 Street provides access to the downtown core and the Northern Alberta Institute of Technology.

The community is represented by the Lauderdale Community League, established in 1957, which maintains a community hall and outdoor rink located at 107 Street and 129 Avenue.

== Demographics ==
In the City of Edmonton's 2012 municipal census, Lauderdale had a population of 2,733 living in 1,333 dwellings, a -4.9% change from its 2009 population of 2,875. With a land area of 1.3 km^{2} (0.50 sq mi), it had a population density of 2,102.3 people/km^{2} in 2012.

== Residential development ==
According to the 2001 federal census, most of the residential development in the neighbourhood occurred after the end of World War II. Two out of every five (42.9%) of all residences were built between 1946 and 1960. Another one in three (32.5%) of all residences were built during the 1960s. One in six (16.5%) of residences were built during the 1970s. Residential development was substantially complete by 1980.

The most common type of residence in the neighbourhood, according to the 2005 municipal census, is the single-family dwelling. These account for three out of every five (57%) of all residences in the neighbourhood. One residence in five (18%) are rented apartments in low-rise buildings with fewer than five stories. One residence in eight (13%) are duplexes and one in eight (12%) are row houses. Three out of every four residences (57%) are owner-occupied while two out of five residences (43%) are rented.

== Population mobility ==
The population of the neighbourhood is somewhat mobile. According to the 2005 municipal census, one in six residents (16.3%) had moved within the previous twelve months. Another one in five (21.1%) had moved within the previous one to three years. Half of all residents (49.5%) had lived at the same address for at least five years.

== Schools and recreation ==
There are two schools in the neighbourhood. Lauderdale Elementary School is operated by the Edmonton Public School System. Ecole Pere-Lacombe (Francophone) is operated by the Greater North Central Francophone Education Region No. 2

The Grand Trunk Arena and the Grand Trunk Fitness and Leisure Centre are both located near the north west corner of the neighbourhood.

== Surrounding neighbourhoods ==
The neighbourhood of Westwood and the Edmonton City Centre Airport is located to the south of the neighbourhood on the south side of the Yellowhead Corridor.

== See also ==
- Edmonton Federation of Community Leagues
