= Crystallina Nera East, Edmonton =

Crystallina Nera East Joviz
- Neighbourhood
- Location of Crystallina Nera East in Edmonton
- Coordinates: 53.640°N 113.449°W
- Country: Canada
- Province: Alberta
- City: Edmonton
- Quadrant: NW
- Ward: tastawiyiniwak
- Sector: North
- Area: Lake District

Government
  - Administrative body: Edmonton City Council
  - Councillor: Karen Principe
- Elevation: 688 m (2,257 ft)

Crystallina Nera East is a neighbourhood in northeast Edmonton, Alberta, Canada. Subdivision and development of the neighbourhood is guided by the Crystallina Nera East Neighbourhood Structure Plan (NSP), which was originally adopted as the Joviz NSP by Edmonton City Council on September 2, 2011.

It is located within Lake District and was originally considered Neighbourhood 4 within the Edmonton North Area Structure Plan (ASP).

Crystallina Nera East is bounded on the west by the Crystallina Nera neighbourhood, north by Anthony Henday Drive, east by 66 Street, and south by the Schonsee neighbourhood.

Originally named Joviz, the neighbourhood was renamed to Crystallina Nera East in 2011 by the City of Edmonton Naming Committee.
