= Evansdale, Edmonton =

Evansdale
- Neighbourhood
- Location of Evansdale in Edmonton
- Coordinates: 53.612°N 113.477°W
- Country: Canada
- Province: Alberta
- City: Edmonton
- Quadrant: NW
- Ward: tastawiyiniwak
- Sector: Mature area
- Area: Dickinsfield

Government
  - Administrative body: Edmonton City Council
  - Councillor: Karen Principe

Area
  - Total: 1.57 km^{2} (0.61 sq mi)

Population (2012)
  - Total: 5,660
  - Density: 3,605.1/km^{2} (9,337/sq mi)
  - Change (2009–12): ▲0.2%
  - Dwellings: 2,147

Evansdale is a neighbourhood in northeast Edmonton, Alberta, Canada. It and the Northmount neighbourhood to the south comprise Edmonton's Dickinsfield community.

Evansdale is bounded by the Griesbach neighbourhood across 97 Street to the west, the Eaux Claires and Belle Rive neighbourhoods across 153 Avenue to the north, the Kilkenny neighbourhood across 82 Street to the east, and the Northmount neighbourhood across 144 Avenue to the south.

The community is represented by the Evansdale Community League, established in 1971, which maintains a community hall and outdoor rink located at 91 Street and 150 Avenue.

== Demographics ==
In the City of Edmonton's 2012 municipal census, Evansdale had a population of 5,660 living in 2,147 dwellings, a 0.2% change from its 2009 population of 5,647. With a land area of 1.57 km^{2} (0.61 sq mi), it had a population density of 3,605.1 people/km^{2} in 2012.

== Housing ==
In 2005, Evandale's housing breakdown consisted of 54% single-family dwellings, 24% low-rise apartments (fewer than five storeys), 19% row houses, and 3% duplexes.

== Education ==
There are three schools in Evansdale including Evansdale Elementary School operated by Edmonton Public Schools and Cardinal Leger Catholic Junior High School and St. Philip Catholic Elementary School operated by Edmonton Catholic Schools.

== See also ==
- Edmonton Federation of Community Leagues
