= Crystallina Nera, Edmonton =

Crystallina Nera
- Neighbourhood
- Location of Crystallina Nera in Edmonton
- Coordinates: 53.640°N 113.460°W
- Country: Canada
- Province: Alberta
- City: Edmonton
- Quadrant: NW
- Ward: tastawiyiniwak
- Sector: North
- Area: Lake District

Government
  - Administrative body: Edmonton City Council
  - Councillor: Karen Principe

Area
  - Total: 0.38 km^{2} (0.15 sq mi)
- Elevation: 686 m (2,251 ft)

Crystallina Nera is a neighbourhood in northeast Edmonton, Alberta, Canada that was established in 2007 through the adoption of the Crystallina Nera Neighbourhood Structure Plan (NSP).

It is located within Lake District and was originally considered Neighbourhood 3 within the Edmonton North Area Structure Plan (ASP).

Crystallina Nera is bounded on the west by 82 Street, north by Anthony Henday Drive, east by the future Crystallina Nera East neighbourhood, and south by the Schonsee neighbourhood.
