= Ozerna, Edmonton =

Ozerna
- Neighbourhood
- Location of Ozerna in Edmonton
- Coordinates: 53.622°N 113.450°W
- Country: Canada
- Province: Alberta
- City: Edmonton
- Quadrant: NW
- Ward: tastawiyiniwak
- Sector: North
- Area: Lake District

Government
  - Administrative body: Edmonton City Council
  - Councillor: Karen Principe

Area
  - Total: 1.12 km^{2} (0.43 sq mi)
- Elevation: 686 m (2,251 ft)

Population (2012)
  - Total: 4,495
  - Density: 4,013.4/km^{2} (10,395/sq mi)
  - Change (2009–12): ▼−1.3%
  - Dwellings: 1,394

Ozerna is a neighbourhood in northeast Edmonton, Alberta, Canada. Subdivision and development of the neighbourhood is guided by the Ozerna Neighbourhood Structure Plan (NSP).

It is located within Edmonton's Lake District and was originally considered Neighbourhood 6 within the Edmonton North Area Structure Plan (ASP).

Ozerna is bounded by the Mayliewan neighbourhood to the west, the Schonsee neighbourhood across 167 Avenue to the north, the Matt Berry neighbourhood across 66 Street to the east, and the Kilkenny neighbourhood across 153 Avenue to the south.

As with all neighbourhoods located within the Lake District, which are named after a body of water or a term for water in a language other than English, Ozerna is a Ukrainian word that means “lake area.”

== Demographics ==
In the City of Edmonton's 2012 municipal census, Ozerna had a population of 4,495 living in 1,394 dwellings, a -1.3% change from its 2009 population of 4,552. With a land area of 1.12 km^{2} (0.43 sq mi), it had a population density of 4,013.4 people/km^{2} in 2012.

== Housing ==
In 2005, Ozerna's housing breakdown consisted of 78% single-family dwellings, 12% duplexes, 10% low-rise apartments (fewer than five storeys), and 1% row houses.

== See also ==
- List of Canadian place names of Ukrainian origin
