= Killarney, Edmonton =

Killarney
- Neighbourhood
- Location of Killarney in Edmonton
- Coordinates: 53.588°N 113.483°W
- Country: Canada
- Province: Alberta
- City: Edmonton
- Quadrant: NW
- Ward: tastawiyiniwak
- Sector: Mature area
- Named for: Killarney, Ireland

Government
  - Administrative body: Edmonton City Council
  - Councillor: Karen Principe

Area
  - Total: 1.33 km^{2} (0.51 sq mi)
- Elevation: 674 m (2,211 ft)

Population (2012)
  - Total: 4,014
  - Density: 3,018/km^{2} (7,820/sq mi)
  - Change (2009–12): ▲2.2%
  - Dwellings: 1,895

Killarney is a residential neighbourhood located in north east Edmonton, Alberta, Canada. While the area became part of Edmonton in 1913, residential development did not occur until the 1950s and 1960s. The neighbourhood is named after Killarney, Ireland.

Killarney is bounded on the north by 132 Avenue, on the east by 82 Street, on the south by 127 Avenue, and on the west by 97 Street. Travel north along 97 Street provides access to shopping and services at Northgate Centre and North Town Mall. Travel south along 97 Street provides access to the downtown core.

The community is represented by the Killarney Community League, established in 1960, which maintains a community hall and outdoor rink located at 87 Street and 130A Avenue.

== Demographics ==
In the City of Edmonton's 2012 municipal census, Killarney had a population of 4,014 living in 1,895 dwellings, a 2.2% change from its 2009 population of 3,929. With a land area of 1.33 km^{2} (0.51 sq mi), it had a population density of 3,018 people/km^{2} in 2012.

== Residential development ==
According to the 2001 federal census, substantially all residential development in the neighbourhood occurred in the first 25 years following World War II. Approximately one residence in three (36.2%) was built between 1946 and 1960. Half of all residences (50.6%) of all residences were built during the 1960s and one residence in ten (9.8%) were built during the 1970s.

The neighbourhood contains a mixture of residence types, with the most common type according to the 2005 municipal census being the single-family dwelling. Single-family dwellings account for one out of every three residences. Duplexes and rented apartments each account for roughly one out of every four residences. Almost all remaining residences are row houses. Approximately three out of every five (60%) residences are rented while only two out of every five (40%) residences are owner-occupied.

Type of Residence	Proportion
Single-family dwelling	34%
Duplexes	26%
Apartments	24%
Row Houses	16%
Total	100%

== Population mobility ==
The population of Killarney is relatively mobile. According to the 2005 municipal census, approximately one resident in five (21.0%) had moved within the previous twelve months. One out of every four (23.4%) residents had moved within the previous one to three years. Only two out of every five residents (41.5%) had lived at the same address for five or more years.

== Schools ==
There are four schools in the neighbourhood.

The Edmonton Public School System operates Killarney Junior High School and Queen Elizabeth High School.

The Edmonton Catholic School System operates St. Matthew Catholic Elementary School. The Catholic system's Archbishop Oleary High School is located to the north of Killarney in the adjoining neighbourhood of Glengarry.

The Mee-Yah-Noh Elementary School is also located in the neighbourhood. Mee-Yah-Noh or ᒥᔺᓄᕽ is a Plains Cree word for "in a good place".

== Surrounding neighbourhoods ==
To the south of the Yellowhead Corridor is the residential neighbourhood of Delton.

== See also ==
- Edmonton Federation of Community Leagues
