= Rapperswill, Edmonton =

Rapperswill
- Neighbourhood
- Location of Rapperswill in Edmonton
- Coordinates: 53.634°N 113.532°W
- Country: Canada
- Province: Alberta
- City: Edmonton
- Quadrant: NW
- Ward: Anirniq
- Sector: North
- Area: Castle Downs

Government
  - Administrative body: Edmonton City Council
  - Councillor: Erin Rutherford

Area
  - Total: 1.03 km^{2} (0.40 sq mi)
- Elevation: 685 m (2,247 ft)

Rapperswill is a new neighbourhood in the Castledowns area of north west Edmonton, Alberta, Canada. It is bounded on the west by 127 Street and on the south by 167 Avenue. The eastern boundary is one half block west of 119 Street. To the north is Edmonton's Rural North West.

As of September 23, 2007, the city of Edmonton utility contained virtually no data on this area. As this area develops, more data should become available.
