= Joseph Morris (Alberta politician) =

Joseph Henry Morris
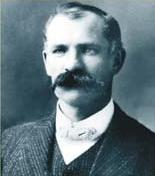

Alderman on the Edmonton Town Council
- In office December 10, 1900 – December 8, 1902

Personal details
- Born: July 12, 1868 Blenheim, Ontario, Canada
- Died: April 19, 1939 (aged 71) Edmonton, Alberta, Canada
- Spouse: Margaret Drummond Jardine (4 children)
- Profession: Grocer

Joseph Henry Morris (July 12, 1867 – April 19, 1939) was a politician and municipal councillor in Edmonton, Alberta.

== Biography ==
Morris was born in Blenheim, Ontario on July 12, 1868. He attended public schools in Ontario, and moved to Medicine Hat, Alberta upon graduating. He relocated to Lethbridge shortly thereafter. In Lethbridge, he was manager for general merchant J. H. Cavanagh until 1895 and also served on the Lethbridge City Council as an alderman and as president of the Lethbridge Board of Trade. He married Margaret Drummond Jardine in June 1895; the pair had four children.

He came to Edmonton in 1897 to open J. H. Morris & Company. The following year he also established a wholesale grocery. He ran for Edmonton Town Council in the 1900 municipal election, and finished second of eight candidates, making him one of three people elected to two year terms as aldermen. He completed his term, but did not seek re-election at its expiration.

Morris served as president of the Edmonton Board of Trade (now the Edmonton Chamber of Commerce) and the Edmonton Exhibition Association. He was also active in the Anglican Church, the Masonic Order, and the Independent Order of Foresters.

Joseph Morris was the owner of Edmonton's first automobile, a 1903 Ford Model A that he brought to town on May 25, 1904. Accordingly, he was granted license place number one. According to legend, until 1905 motorists in what later became Alberta were responsible for making their own license plates, and Morris elected to use a broomstick. He was brought into court for having an unsatisfactory license plate, but was able to convince the judge that displaying the broomstick vertically at the back of the car satisfied the requirement that his license number be displayed. Whether the legend is true or not, in 1905 Morris was issued with a leather license plate with the number one.

Joseph Morris died in 1939.
