= CFB Griesbach =

Location
- Location of CFB Griesbach
- Coordinates: 53.608°N 113.504°W

Former Location of CFB Griesbach in Edmonton

CFB Griesbach (Griesbach Barracks) was an army base that was located in the north end of Edmonton, Alberta, Canada. The site was named after Major-General William Antrobus Griesbach (1878–1945), a veteran of the Second Boer War, the First World War and the Second World War. Griesbach was also an Edmonton alderman and mayor, and served as a Member of Parliament and a Senator.

== History ==
The base was established in 1950 as Griesbach Barracks. In 1958, No. 14 Service Prison and Detention Barracks opened at the base and the 2nd Battalion Princess Patricia's Canadian Light Infantry was relocated to Griesbach from Currie Barracks in Calgary, Alberta. On 1 April 1966 Griesbach Barracks and RCAF Station Namao were designated CFB Edmonton. In 1970 the Canadian Parachute Training Centre (CPTC) was moved to CFB Greisbach from RCAF Station Rivers, Manitoba, and the 3rd Battalion Princess Patricia's Canadian Light Infantry was stood up to full strength from being a 10/90 battalion in 1996 and was relocated to Griesbach into the former CPTC lines from Chilliwack, British Columbia.

The site is no longer administered by the Department of National Defence, but was transferred to the Canada Lands Company in 2001 for $17.5 million, considered fair market value at the time. Former lodger units located here included the Canadian Airborne Centre and the Canadian Forces Parachute Maintenance Depot, both of which were moved to CFB Trenton in the mid 1990s, as plans to close the runway at Namao (CFB Edmonton) accelerated.

Much of the former Griesbach Barracks site underwent major redevelopment, with the entire 2.5 km^{2} (620 acres) fully re-developed in 2018. Part of the land was purchased from Canada Lands in 2003 by the Capital Care Group, and is now used as a long-term care centre: the Kipnes Centre for Veterans, which was opened in November 2005.

== See also ==
- Griesbach, Edmonton
- CFB Edmonton

== External sources ==
- DND Site for CFB Edmonton
- Kipnes Centre for Veterans
