= Northmount, Edmonton =

Northmount
- Neighbourhood
- Location of Northmount in Edmonton
- Coordinates: 53.602°N 113.479°W
- Country: Canada
- Province: Alberta
- City: Edmonton
- Quadrant: NW
- Ward: tastawiyiniwak
- Sector: Mature area
- Area: Dickinsfield

Government
  - Administrative body: Edmonton City Council
  - Councillor: Karen Principe

Area
  - Total: 1.22 km^{2} (0.47 sq mi)
- Elevation: 678 m (2,224 ft)

Population (2012)
  - Total: 3,247
  - Density: 2,661.5/km^{2} (6,893/sq mi)
  - Change (2009–12): ▼−3%
  - Dwellings: 1,191

Northmount is a neighbourhood in northwest Edmonton, Alberta, Canada. It and the Evansdale neighbourhood to the north comprise Edmonton's Dickinsfield community.

Northmount is bounded by the Griesbach neighbourhood across 97 Street to the west, the Evansdale neighbourhood across 144 Avenue to the north, the Kildare neighbourhood across 82 Street to the east, and the Glengarry neighbourhood across 137 Avenue to the south.

The community is represented by the Northmount Community League, established in 1971, which maintains a community hall and outdoor rink located at 92 Street and 140 Avenue.

== Demographics ==
In the City of Edmonton's 2012 municipal census, Northmount had a population of 3,247 living in 1,191 dwellings, a -3% change from its 2009 population of 3,346. With a land area of 1.22 km^{2} (0.47 sq mi), it had a population density of 2,661.5 people/km^{2} in 2012.

== Housing ==
In 2005, Northmount's housing breakdown consisted of 69% single-family dwellings, 21% row houses, 7% rooming houses, and 2% low-rise apartments (fewer than five storeys).

== Schools ==
There are three schools in Northmount including Dickinsfield Junior High School and Northmount Elementary School operated by Edmonton Public Schools and St. Anne Catholic Elementary School operated by Edmonton Catholic Schools.

== Shopping ==
North Town Centre is located at the southwest corner of Northmount. Northgate Centre is located across 137 Avenue from North Town Centre to the south in Glengarry.

== Health care ==
The Dickinsfield Extended Care Hospital is located in the Northmount.

== Northgate Transit Centre ==
Northgate Transit Centre

General information
- Platforms: 10 bus bays

Construction
- Parking: No
- Accessible: Yes

Other information
- Website: Northgate Transit Centre

History
- Opened: January 16, 1987
Location

The Northgate Transit Centre, opened on January 16, 1987, is located on the north side of 137 Avenue on 97 Street in front of North Town Centre across from Northgate Centre. This transit centre has public washrooms, a convenience store, a large shelter and a pay phone. There is no park & ride, drop off area, or vending machines at this transit centre.

The original 1986 transit centre shelter was replaced in 2013. The new shelter, built as a part of $4.575 million in upgrades to the transit centre that year, won an "award of merit" from the Prairie Design Awards in 2014 partly for the use of brightly coloured panels on the building facade.

The following bus routes serve the transit centre:

To/From	Routes
Belvedere Transit Centre	106
Carlton	109
Castle Downs Transit Centre	109, 127
Century Park Transit Centre	9-Owl
Christy's Corner	52, 54, 905
Clareview Transit Centre	54, 113, 114
Coliseum Transit Centre	114
Cumberland	109
Downtown	9, 110X, 120X
Eaux Claires Transit Centre	9, 110X, 120X
Government Centre Transit Centre	110X, 120X
Griesbach	109
Jasper Place Transit Centre	52
Londonderry	54, 113, 114, 128
NAIT	9, 110X
Southgate Transit Centre	9
West Edmonton Mall Transit Centre	52, 54
Westmount Transit Centre	52, 905

== See also ==
- Edmonton Federation of Community Leagues
- Edmonton Transit System
