= Glengarry, Edmonton =

Glengarry
- Neighbourhood
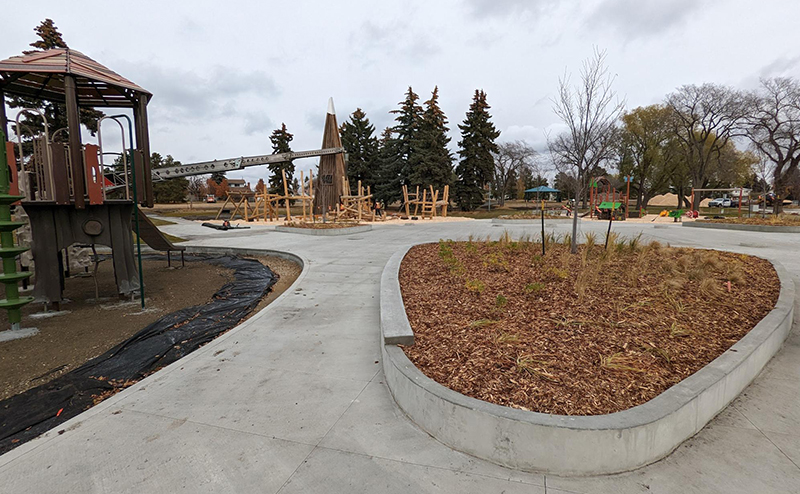
- Glengarry Park

- Location of Glengarry in Edmonton
- Coordinates: 53.596°N 113.479°W
- Country: Canada
- Province: Alberta
- City: Edmonton
- Quadrant: NW
- Ward: tastawiyiniwak
- Sector: Mature area

Government
  - Administrative body: Edmonton City Council
  - Councillor: Karen Principe

Area
  - Total: 1.34 km^{2} (0.52 sq mi)
- Elevation: 678 m (2,224 ft)

Population (2019)
  - Total: 3,131
  - Density: 2,336.6/km^{2} (6,052/sq mi)
  - Change (2016–19): ▲+4.1%
  - Dwellings: 1,302

Glengarry is a residential neighbourhood located in northeast Edmonton, Alberta, Canada. Northgate Centre is a major shopping mall in the neighbourhood's northwest corner. North Town Mall is located immediately north of Glengarry in the neighbourhood of Northmount.

The neighbourhood is bounded on the north by 137 Avenue, on the south by 132 Avenue, on the east by 82 Street and on the west by 97 Street.

The Glengarry Community League, established in 1964, represents the community, which maintains a community hall and outdoor rink at 9 Street and 133 Avenue.

== Demographics ==
In the City of Edmonton's 2019 municipal census, Glengarry had a population of 3,131 living in 1,302 dwellings, a +4.1% change from its 2016 population of 3,009. With a land area of 1.34 km^{2} (0.52 sq mi), it had a population density of 2,336.6 people/km^{2} in 2019.

== Residential development ==
Residential development in Glengarry largely dates back to after World War II and was completed in 1985. According to the 2001 federal census, approximately one in seven (15.2%) residences were built between 1946 and 1960. Most of the development was during the 1960s, with seven out of every ten (70.8%) residences being constructed between 1961 and 1970. The remaining one in eight (12.6%) residences were built between 1971 and 1985.

The single-family dwelling is the most common type of residence in the neighbourhood, accounting for just over half (55%) of all residences according to the 2005 municipal census. Another one in five (21%) residences are row houses. Rented apartments in both low-rise and high-rise buildings account for another 17%. Duplexes account for the remaining 7%. Approximately three out of every four (73%) residences are owner-occupied, while the remaining one out of every four (27%) are rented.

== Population mobility ==
The population of the neighbourhood is comparatively stable. According to the 2005 municipal census, approximately two out of every three residents (63.9%) had lived at the same address for five years or more.

== Schools ==
There are four schools in Glengarry. St. Cecilia Junior High School and Archbishop O'Leary High School are operated by the Edmonton Catholic School System. The Edmonton Public School System operates Glengarry Elementary School. The Fresh Start Outreach High School is also located in the neighbourhood.

Queen Elizabeth High School is located just south of Glengarry in the adjoining neighbourhood of Killarney.

== See also ==
- Edmonton Federation of Community Leagues
