= Edmund Grierson =

Canadian politician (1860–1922)

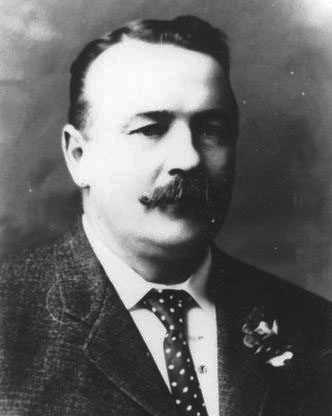

Alderman on the Edmonton Town Council
- In office December 9, 1901 – December 12, 1904

Personal details
- Born: April 2, 1860 Cavan, Canada West
- Died: March 4, 1922 (aged 61) Victoria, British Columbia
- Spouse: Lola Booth
- Profession: Hotelier

Edmund Edward DeLesert Grierson (April 2, 1860 – March 4, 1922) was a politician in Alberta, Canada and a municipal councillor in Edmonton.

== Biography ==
Grierson was born in Cavan, Canada West on April 2, 1860. He left home when he was eleven years old and worked a variety of jobs in western Ontario until 1878. He subsequently moved to Michigan and worked in the lumbering and railroad businesses; upon his return to Canada in 1883, he worked on constructing the Canadian Pacific Railway line westward from Winnipeg, Manitoba. He worked for the Canadian Anthracite Coal Company for eight years, and then helped with the construction of the CPR Hotel in Banff.

He moved to Edmonton in 1893 and purchased the Queen's Hotel with business partner Fred Jackson. He managed it for three years before buying the Alberta Hotel in 1897, on to which he added an addition which made it the first four-storey structure in Edmonton.

He first ran for office in the 1901 Edmonton election, when he was elected to a two-year term as alderman on Edmonton Town Council. He was re-elected in the 1903 election, finishing second of nine candidates, but did not seek re-election after his term was truncated by Edmonton's incorporation as a city the following year.

In 1904, Grierson married Lola Booth. The couple moved to Victoria, British Columbia in 1909.

Grierson died March 4, 1922. Grierson Hill in Edmonton is named in his honour.
