= Lake District, Edmonton =

Lake District
- Area
- Location of Lake District in Edmonton
- Coordinates: 53.628°N 113.468°W
- Country: Canada
- Province: Alberta
- City: Edmonton
- Quadrant: NW
- Ward: tastawiyiniwak

Government
  - Administrative body: Edmonton City Council
  - Councillor: Karen Principe
- Elevation: 684 m (2,244 ft)

Population
  - Total: 27,276

Lake District or Edmonton North is a residential area in the northeast portion of the City of Edmonton in Alberta, Canada. It was established in 1979 through Edmonton City Council's adoption of the Edmonton North Area Structure Plan, which guides the overall development of the area.

== Geography ==
Located in northeast Edmonton, the Lake District area is bounded by 97 Street (Highway 28) to the west, 153 Avenue to the south, and Anthony Henday Drive (Highway 216) to the north and east. The area is bisected by 167 Avenue and 82 Street.

The Castle Downs area lies beyond 97 Street to the west, while the Dickinsfield and Londonderry areas are beyond 153 Avenue to the south and the Pilot Sound area is beyond 66 Street to the east. CFB Edmonton is located 1.2 km (0.75 mi) to the north of Anthony Henday Drive within Sturgeon County.

== Neighbourhoods ==
The Edmonton North Area Structure Plan originally planned for nine separate residential neighbourhoods for the Lake District area. Today, the Lake District area includes the following:

- Belle Rive;
- Crystallina Nera;
- Crystallina Nera East;
- Eaux Claires;
- Klarvatten;
- Lago Lindo;
- Mayliewan;
- Ozerna;
- Schonsee;
- McConachie; and
- Cy Becker.

== Land use plans ==
In addition to the Edmonton North Area Structure Plan, the following plans were adopted to further guide development of certain portions of the Lake District area:

- the Belle Rive Neighbourhood Structure Plan (NSP) in 1982, which applies to the Belle Rive neighbourhood;
- the Crystallina Nera NSP in 2007, which applies to the Crystallina Nera neighbourhood;
- the Eaux Claires NSP in 1986, which applies to the Eaux Claires neighbourhood;
- the Joviz NSP in 2011, which applies to the Joviz neighbourhood;
- the Klarvatten NSP in 1982, which applies to the Klarvatten neighbourhood;
- the Lago Lindo NSP in 1980, which applies to the Lago Lindo neighbourhood;
- the Mayliewan NSP in 1983, which applies to the Mayliewan neighbourhood;
- the Ozerna NSP in 1981, which applies to the Ozerna neighbourhood; and
- the Schonsee NSP in 2002, which applies to the Schonsee neighbourhood.
