= John Coleman Calhoun =

Canadian politician (1871–1950)

John C. Calhoun
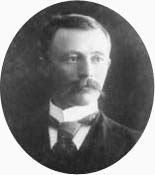

Alderman on the Edmonton City Council
- In office May 1906 – December 10, 1906

Personal details
- Born: March 1871 Albert County, New Brunswick, Canada
- Died: September 28, 1950 (aged 79) Edmonton, Alberta, Canada
- Profession: Hotelier, rancher

John Coleman Calhoun (March 1871 – September 28, 1950) was a politician in Alberta, Canada and a municipal councillor in Edmonton in 1906. He was an Edmonton businessman, operating Edmonton's leading hotel at the time.

== Biography ==
Calhoun was born in 1871 in Albert County, New Brunswick, where he remained until he moved to British Columbia in 1885. He stayed there for ten years before moving to Alberta to engage in ranching and fur trading. He moved to Edmonton in 1895 where he worked in real estate and horse trading. In 1906, he built the King Edward Hotel, which would become Edmonton's leading hotel after a 1910 expansion.

Calhoun made his first bid for elected office in the 1905 election, when finished ninth out of ten candidates for alderman, thus missing out on any of the four seats available. However, on May 7, 1906, John R. Boyle resigned from Edmonton City Council, and Calhoun was elected to finish his term (which ran until December of that year). He did not seek re-election, but did run in the 1907 election, once he was a year removed from office. He was a part of a group of city businessmen that acquired the first gas franchise for the city. He finished ninth of twelve, and did not try to re-enter politics again.

Calhoun sold the King Edward Hotel in 1940, and retired, splitting his time between a home in British Columbia and his home in Edmonton. Calhoun died in an Edmonton hospital on September 28, 1950. He was survived by his wife, three sons and two daughters and was cremated shortly after his funeral service.

John Calhoun was a long-time member of the Independent Order of Foresters.
