= Canossa, Edmonton =

Canossa
- Neighbourhood
- Location of Canossa in Edmonton
- Coordinates: 53.636°N 113.524°W
- Country: Canada
- Province: Alberta
- City: Edmonton
- Quadrant: NW
- Ward: Anirniq
- Sector: North
- Area: Castle Downs

Government
  - Administrative body: Edmonton City Council
  - Councillor: Erin Rutherford

Area
  - Total: 1.3 km^{2} (0.50 sq mi)
- Elevation: 684 m (2,244 ft)

Population (2012)
  - Total: 3,214
  - Density: 2,472.3/km^{2} (6,403/sq mi)
  - Change (2009–12): ▲5.9%
  - Dwellings: 1,042

Canossa is a residential neighbourhood in the Castledowns area of north Edmonton, Alberta, Canada. As with all north end neighbourhoods, its location makes it an attractive place for people who work on CFB Edmonton, but choose to live off base.

Canossa is a newer neighbourhood. According to the 2001 federal census, all residential construction in the neighbourhood occurred after 1990, with two-thirds of the construction being completed during the second half of the decade.

According to the 2005 municipal census, the most common type of residence in the neighbourhood is the single-family dwelling. These make up 84% of all the residences in the neighbourhood. The remaining residences are duplexes (11%) and row houses (5%). Substantially all residences (97%) are owner-occupied.

== Demographics ==
In the City of Edmonton's 2012 municipal census, Canossa had a population of 3,214 living in 1,042 dwellings, a 5.9% change from its 2009 population of 3,034. With a land area of 1.3 km^{2} (0.50 sq mi), it had a population density of 2,472.3 people/km^{2} in 2012.

The average household income in Canossa is significantly higher than the average household income for the City of Edmonton.

Income By Household - 2001 Census
Income Range ($)	Canossa	Edmonton
	(% of Households)	(% of Households)
Under $10,000	0.0%	6.3%
$10,000-$19,999	0.0%	12.4%
$20,000-$29,999	3.1%	11.9%
$30,000-$39,999	6.3%	11.8%
$40,000-$49,999	6.3%	10.9%
$50,000-$59,999	14.1%	9.5%
$60,000-$69,999	12.5%	8.3%
$70,000-$79,999	15.5%	6.7%
$80,000-$89,999	4.7%	5.4%
$90,000-$99,999	9.4%	4.2%%
$100,000 and over	28.1%	12.6%%
Average household income	$81,757	$57,360

It is bounded on the east by 112 Street, on the south by 167 Avenue, on the west by a north-south line half a block west of 119 Street, and on the north by rural farmland.
