= 1907 Edmonton municipal by-election =

Municipal election in Alberta, Canada

Two by-elections were held to fill empty aldermanic seats on the Edmonton city council in 1907.

== August 26, 1907 by-election ==
On August 6, 1907, Morton MacAuley, an alderman on Edmonton City Council, resigned from council. Since his term was not due to expire until December, the city held a by-election on August 26. George Manuel defeated James D. Blayney by a count of 482 votes to 370 votes, and was elected to fulfill Macauley's term.

== December 30, 1907 by-election ==
J.B. Walker, elected in 1906, resigned after just one year of his two-year term.

Polling for the by-election was conducted at City Hall on December 30, 1907.

Three candidates ran to replace him. D.R. Fraser was elected, and Col. E.B. Edwards and John Galbraith were unsuccessful. Fraser got more votes than the other two put together.
