= William Antrobus Griesbach =

Canadian politician (1878–1945)

Major General the Honourable William Antrobus Griesbach CB CMG DSO VD KC
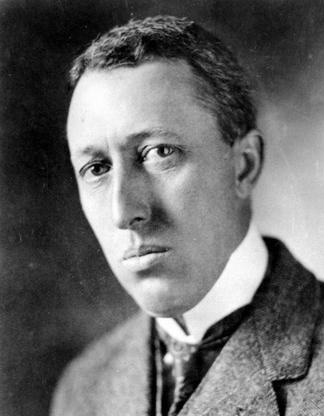

Canadian Senator from Alberta
- In office September 15, 1921 – January 21, 1945
- Preceded by: Peter Talbot
- Succeeded by: Frederick William Gershaw

Member of Parliament for Edmonton West
- In office December 17, 1917 – September 15, 1921
- Preceded by: New district
- Succeeded by: Donald MacBeth Kennedy

9th Mayor of Edmonton
- In office December 10, 1906 – December 9, 1907
- Preceded by: Charles May
- Succeeded by: John Alexander McDougall

Alderman on the Edmonton City Council
- In office December 12, 1904 – December 10, 1906

Personal details
- Born: January 3, 1878 Fort Qu'Appelle, North-West Territories, Canada
- Died: January 21, 1945 (aged 67) Edmonton, Alberta, Canada
- Party: Conservative Party of Canada
- Other political affiliations: Unionist Party of Canada, Progressive Conservative Party of Alberta
- Spouse: Janet Scott McDonald Lauder
- Profession: Politician; lawyer; soldier

Military service
- Allegiance: Canada
- Branch/service: Canadian Army
- Years of service: 1899–1901; 1906–1918; 1940–1943
- Rank: Major general
- Unit: Canadian Mounted Rifles; 19th Alberta Dragoons
- Commands: 1st Canadian Brigade; 49th Battalion (Edmonton Regiment), CEF
- Battles/wars: World War I; World War II

Major General William Antrobus Griesbach, CB, CMG, DSO & Bar, VD, KC (January 3, 1878 – January 21, 1945) was a Canadian politician, decorated soldier, mayor of Edmonton, and member of the House of Commons and of the Senate.

== Early life ==
Griesbach was born in Fort Qu'Appelle, North-West Territories, the son of Arthur Henry Griesbach, a North-West Mounted Police officer. Henry was on the NWMP's famous 1874 March West, finishing the march in Edmonton. In 1883, Arthur was transferred to command Fort Saskatchewan; the family travelled on the Canadian Pacific Railway to Calgary and then by wagon train to Edmonton and Fort Saskatchewan, on occasion having to build or repair bridges in order to cross rivers.

William Griesbach left the rest of the family in 1891 in order to attend St. John's College in Winnipeg, from which he graduated in 1895. Upon graduating, he returned to Edmonton and worked in a law firm for two years and in the Imperial Bank of Canada for one year, before returning to Fort Saskatchewan to work in a milling business for six months. He returned to Edmonton to study law.

== Boer War and legal career ==
Griesbach enlisted with the Canadian Mounted Rifles in 1899 to fight in the Second Boer War. He knew from being weighed in at boxing tournaments that he fell short of the minimum 140-pound (64 kg) weight to enlist, so on his way to being weighed he surreptitiously grabbed a large piece of coal from the enlistment centre's coal box and held it behind his back while he stood on the scales. During his service, he was awarded the Queen's South Africa Medal and received four bars.

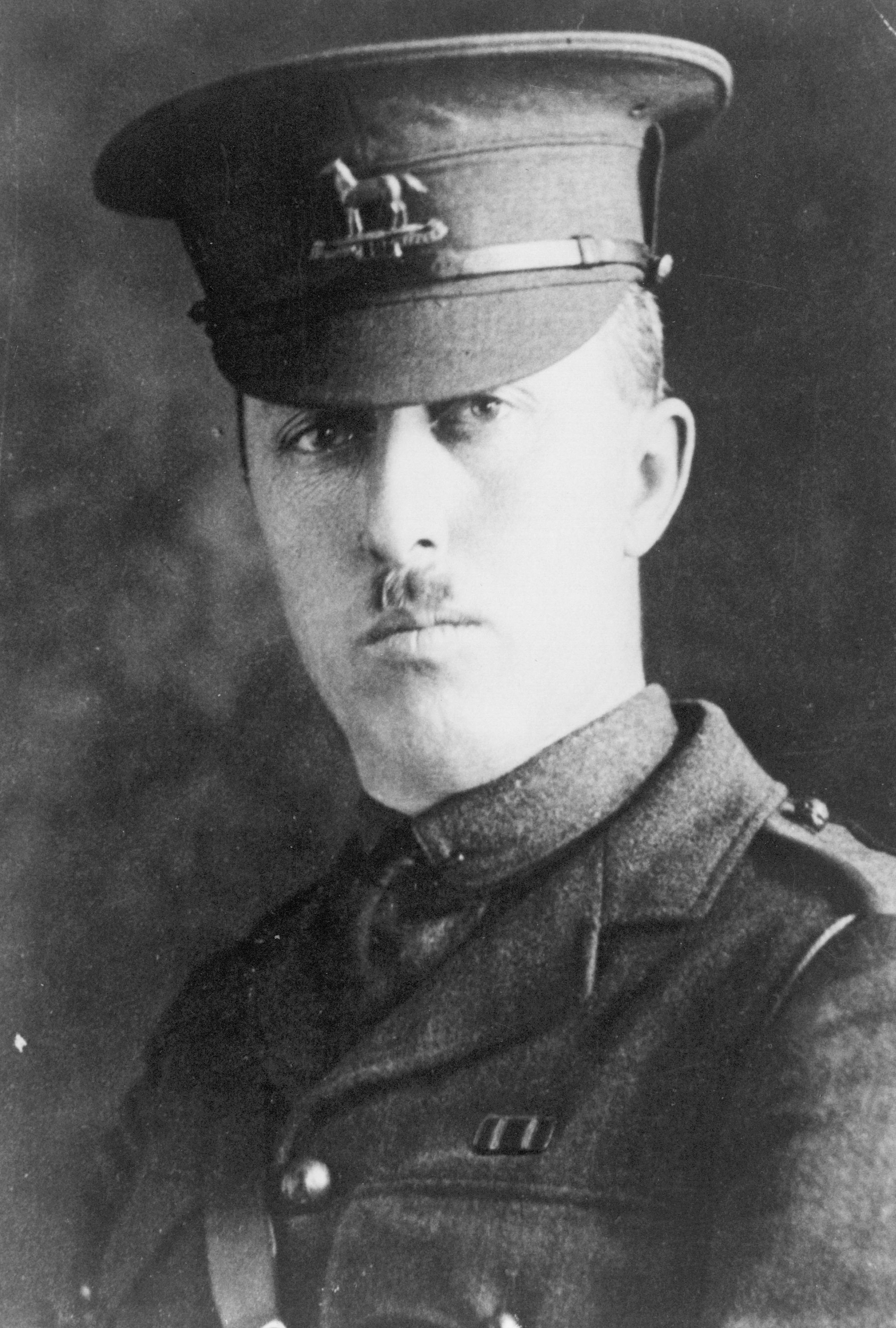
Griesbach as a member of the 19th Alberta Dragoons

Upon his return in 1901, he opened a law office of his own. An Edmonton Bulletin article in 1927 quoted him as saying of these early years

My rent was $12 a month. The first month I didn't make anything; the second I made exactly $12, and the third I went up to $17. Most of my callers in those days were people who wanted to sell me books.

== Pre-war political career ==
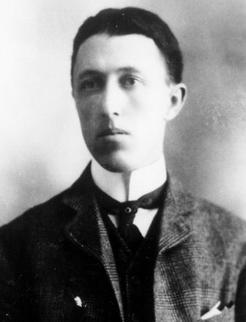
Griesbach in his earlier days

Griesbach's first bid for political office took place in the 1903 Edmonton election, when he made an unsuccessful bid for election to Edmonton Town Council, placing fourth of nine candidates in an election in which the top three were elected. In 1904, he was elected to a one-year term as an alderman on Edmonton's first city council placing eighth of seventeen candidates. (In that first election as a city, Edmonton elected four aldermen to two year terms and four to one year terms, with the idea that four of the city's eight aldermen would be elected to two year terms each year, in staggered terms). He was re-elected to a two-year term in 1905, finishing first of ten candidates.

Previously that same year, he had run as a Conservative in the constituency of Edmonton in Alberta's first provincial election. Defeated by Liberal Charles Cross, he continued his service on city council.

Griesbach resigned as alderman one year into his term in order to run for mayor in the 1906 election. He was victorious, collecting more than sixty percent of the vote in a three-person race and becoming, at twenty-eight years old, the youngest mayor in the city's history, before or since. He served a one-year term, but did not seek re-election and stayed out of municipal politics thereafter.

He ran as a Conservative in the 1911 federal election, finishing second of three candidates in the riding of Edmonton. (The victorious candidate was Liberal Frank Oliver).

Griesbach's final involvement in provincial politics came during the 1913 election, when he ran as a Conservative in the Edmonton district. He finished fourth of five candidates, missing out on either of the district's two seats.

== World War I and World War II ==
In 1906, Griesbach was commissioned as a lieutenant in the 19th Alberta Dragoons. He was promoted to captain in 1907

When World War I broke out, the Dragoons were ordered to embark to the war. In December of that year, Griesbach was promoted to major assigned to command the 49th Battalion. He recruited 1000 men in eight days in January 1915. The unit fought in the Battle of Vimy Ridge, the Battle of Arras, the Battle of Passchendaele, and the liberation of Mons.

In February 1917, Griesbach was promoted to temporary brigadier general and assigned command of the 1st Canadian Infantry Brigade of the 1st Canadian Division in succession to Garnet Hughes.

He was awarded the Distinguished Service Order twice and the Colonial Auxiliary Forces Officers' Decoration for long service. He was appointed Companion of the Order of the Bath and Companion of the Order of St. Michael and St. George. The citation for his DSO appeared in The London Gazette in June 1916 and reads as follows:

For conspicuous gallantry and skill in the handling of his battalion during a heavy bombardment and subsequent attack by the enemy. On another occasion by his prompt action and fine example, he was largely responsible for the rescue of several men who had been buried by shell fire.

For actions taken during Canada's Hundred Days, he was awarded a bar to his DSO. His citation stated the following:

For brilliant leadership and great gallantry in the operations of 8th August, 1918, south-east of Amiens; 2nd and 3rd September, 1918, east of Arras; and 27th/28th September, 1918, west and north-west of Cambrai in the crossing of the Canal du Nord and attack on Bourlon Wood; and during operations 17th/21st October. He made several personal reconnaissances, and his presence amongst the attacking troops and his coolness under critical conditions were largely responsible for the success that attended the operations.

During World War II, he was made Inspector General of the Canadian Army for Western Canada and was promoted to the rank of major-general. He retired from that position in 1943.

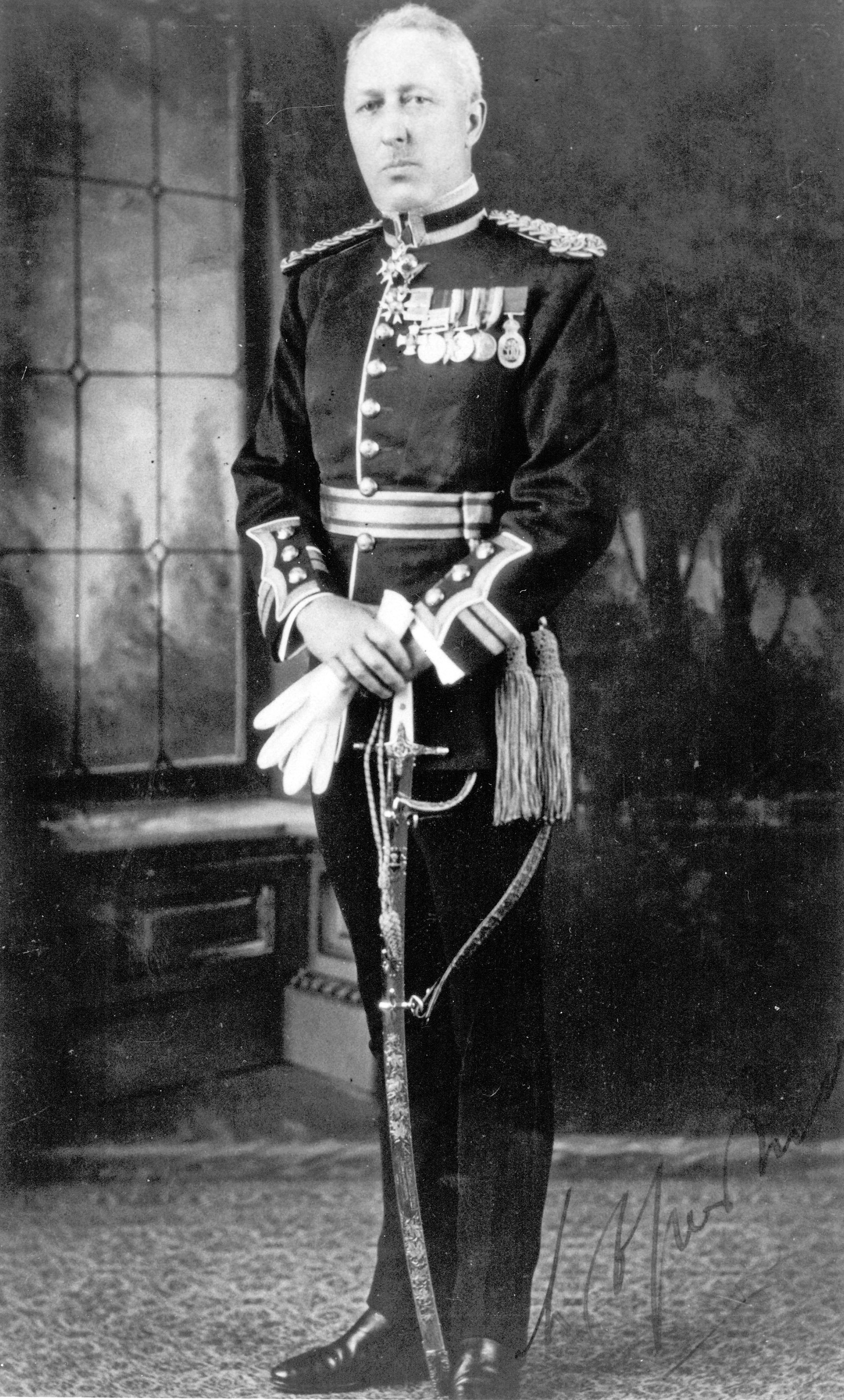
Griesbach in full dress as Inspector-General

== Federal Parliament ==
William Griesbach was elected to the House of Commons as a Government member for the riding of Edmonton West in the 1917 election, defeating incumbent Laurier Liberal Frank Oliver. He served until September 15, 1921 (less than three months before the 1921 election), when he was appointed to the Senate, in which he served until his death.

== Personal life, death, and legacy ==
Griesbach was an accomplished cyclist and played ice hockey and soccer for Edmonton teams. He was a member of the Masonic Order, the Oddfellows, the Edmonton Veteran Association, the Canadian Club, and the Northern Alberta Pioneer and Old Timers' Association.

In 1906, he married Janet Scott McDonald Lauder.

William Antrobus Griesbach died in Edmonton on January 21, 1945, of a sudden heart attack.

CFB Griesbach, the Griesbach Garrison (part of CFB Edmonton), Griesbach Masonic Lodge, and Edmonton's Griesbach neighbourhood are named in his honour. Mount Griesbach in the Victoria Cross Ranges of Jasper National Park is also named in his honour.

He was author of I Remember (1946) about his life and Observations on Cavalry Duties: Some Hints for Western Canadian Cavalry Men (1914).

Political offices
| Preceded by Charles May | Mayor of Edmonton; 1907 | Succeeded by John Alexander McDougall |
Parliament of Canada
| Preceded by New district | Member of Parliament Edmonton West; 1917–1921 | Succeeded by Donald Macbeth Kennedy |
| Preceded by Peter Talbot | Senator Alberta; 1921–1945 | Succeeded by Frederick William Gershaw |
