= Thomas Daly (Alberta politician) =

Canadian politician

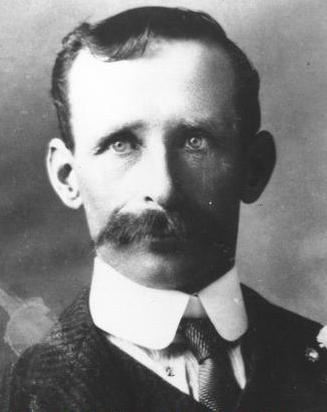

Alderman on the Edmonton City Council
- In office December 10, 1906 – 1907

Personal details
- Born: February 21, 1861; Letterbreen, Ireland
- Died: November 17, 1908 (aged 47); Edmonton, Alberta
- Spouse: Jessie Gray (deceased October 1908)
- Profession: Farmer

Thomas Daly (February 21, 1861 – November 17, 1908) was an Irish-born Canadian Politician and a municipal councillor in Edmonton. He was also a prize-winning farmer in the Clover Bar area.

== Biography ==
Daly was born in Letterbreen, Ireland and immigrated to Canada in 1881. He spent two years in Manitoba and moved to Alberta in 1883 to homestead at Clover Bar. He exhibited his oats at the 1893 Chicago World's Fair and won first prize; he is sometimes credited with establishing Alberta's reputation as an oats producer. He later turned to apple farming. In 1894, he married Jessie Gray.

In the 1906 Edmonton election, Daly ran for Edmonton City Council as an alderman. He finished second of twelve candidates and was elected to a two-year term, but resigned less than a year into his term. He said with regret that the duties in connection with his farm at Clover Bar demanded that he should move to live there.

Jessie, his wife, died in October 1908. Thomas Daly died just a month later on November 17, 1908.

Daly Grove, an Edmonton neighbourhood, is named in his honour.
