= Delton, Edmonton =

Delton
- Neighbourhood
- Location of Delton in Edmonton
- Coordinates: 53.579°N 113.482°W
- Country: Canada
- Province: Alberta
- City: Edmonton
- Quadrant: NW
- Ward: Métis
- Sector: Mature area

Government
  - Administrative body: Edmonton City Council
  - Councillor: Ashley Salvador

Area
  - Total: 0.68 km^{2} (0.26 sq mi)
- Elevation: 669 m (2,195 ft)

Population (2012)
  - Total: 2,032
  - Density: 2,988.2/km^{2} (7,739/sq mi)
  - Change (2009–12): ▲0.8%
  - Dwellings: 977

Delton is a neighbourhood located in north central Edmonton, Alberta, Canada. It is named after Edmonton businessman and former alderman Edmund Del Grierson. An older area in Edmonton, some houses dating back to 1904. The neighbourhood is bounded on the north by the CN Railway tracks, on the west by 97 Street, on the east by 86 Street, and on the south by 122 Avenue.

Surrounding neighbourhoods are Eastwood to the east and south east, Alberta Avenue to the south, and Westwood to the west. North of Delton, on the far side of the Yellowhead corridor, is the neighbourhood of Killarney.

The community is represented by the Delton Community League, established in 1961, which maintains a community hall and outdoor rink located at 88 Street and 123 Avenue.

== Demographics ==
In the City of Edmonton's 2012 municipal census, Delton had a population of 2,032 living in 977 dwellings, a plus 0.8% change from its 2009 population of 2,016. With a land area of 0.68 km^{2} (0.26 sq mi), it had a population density of 2,988.2 people/km^{2} in 2012.

Incomes in Delton are lower than the city average.

Income By Household - 2001 Census
Income Range ($)	Delton	Edmonton
	(% of Households)	(% of Households)
Under $10,000	2.4%	6.3%
$10,000-$19,999	10.1%	12.4%
$20,000-$29,999	19.0%	11.9%
$30,000-$39,999	12.5%	11.8%
$40,000-$49,999	14.9%	10.9%
$50,000-$59,999	8.3%	9.5%
$60,000-$69,999	13.1%	8.3%
$70,000-$79,999	7.2%	6.7%
$80,000-$89,999	3.6%	5.4%
$90,000-$99,999	1.2%	4.2%%
$100,000 and over	7.7%	12.6%%
Average household income	$49,205	$57,360

Example.jpg|Caption1 Example.jpg|Caption2

== Images ==
Delton Grocery east side

The entrance of Delton Grocery in Edmonton, Canada

The north side of Delton Grocery in Edmonton, Canada

Delton Grocery Municipal Historic Resource designation plaque

Delton Park, Edmonton

== See also ==
- Edmonton Federation of Community Leagues
