= 1906 Edmonton municipal election =

Municipal election in Alberta, Canada

The 1906 municipal election was held December 10, 1906 for the purpose of electing a mayor and five aldermen to sit on the Edmonton City Council, as well as five public school trustees and six separate school trustees.

There were eight aldermen on city council, but three of the positions were already filled: Robert Manson, Joseph Henri Picard, and Samuel Smith had been elected to two-year terms in 1905, and were still in office. William Antrobus Griesbach had also been elected to a two-year term in 1905, but resigned to run for mayor. Accordingly, five were to be elected, with the fifth place aldermanic candidate - Morton MacAuley - to be elected to serve out the remaining year of Griesbach's term. (MacAuley and Walker resigned the following year, each causing a by-election.

In the election of mayor, each voter had one vote. ln the aldermanic and schoolboard elections, each voter could cast as many votes as the number of empty seats. Edmonton had no wards at that time.

== Voter turnout ==
In total, 1221 voters voted in the 1906 municipal election. The number of eligible voters is no longer available.

== Results ==
(bold indicates elected, italics indicate incumbent)

=== Mayor ===
- **William Antrobus Griesbach** - 717
- Thomas Bellamy - 301
- H J Dawson - 144

(Thomas Bellamy stated he was in favour of municipal ownership.)

=== Aldermen ===
- **Wilfrid Gariépy** - 585
- **Thomas Daly** - 564 (East End candidate)
- **James Walker** - 559
- **Cameron Anderson** - 480 (East End candidate)
- **Morton MacAuley** - 417 (East End candidate)
- Gustave Koerman - 399
- Wade Stuart - 312
- Lucien Dubuc - 305
- A H Allen - 276
- W S Weeks - 260
- J R Hetherington - 91
- F M Lannic - 77

=== Public school trustees ===
W D Ferris, H A Gray, A E May, Alex Taylor, and Hedley C. Taylor were elected. Detailed results are no longer available.

=== Separate (Catholic) school trustees ===
Wilfrid Gariépy, E J Hart, Prosper-Edmond Lessard, Joseph Henri Picard, S Schultz, and O Tessier were elected. Detailed results are no longer available.
