= James Walker (Alberta politician) =

James Burns Walker
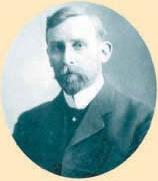

Alderman on the Edmonton City Council
- In office December 10, 1906 – 1907

Personal details
- Born: March 23, 1874 Alberton, Ontario, Canada
- Profession: Businessman

James Burns Walker (born March 23, 1874 – ?) was a Canadian politician in Alberta, and a municipal councillor in Edmonton.

== Biography ==
Walker was born March 23, 1874, in Alberton, Ontario. He worked in the insurance and finance businesses in Hamilton before relocating to Montreal, where he spent seven years as a wholesaler. In April, 1904, he came to Edmonton and worked as an insurance and financial broker. In the 1906 Edmonton election he ran for Edmonton City Council as an alderman. He was elected to a two-year term after placing third of twelve candidates. He resigned a year into his term. A by-election held in late December 1907 secured Daniel Fraser as replacement.

James Walker was active with the Edmonton Board of Trade (which later became the Edmonton Chamber of Commerce) and the Liberal Party of Canada.

== Sources ==
- Edmonton Public Library biography of James Walker
- City of Edmonton biography of James Walker
