= List of historic places in Regina =

This article is a list of historic places in Regina, Saskatchewan entered on the Canadian Register of Historic Places, whether they are federal, provincial, or municipal.

== List of historic places ==
Name	Address	Coordinates	Government recognition (CRHP №)	Wikidata ID	Image
2241 Victoria Avenue	2241 Victoria Avenue; Regina SK	50°26′50″N 104°36′48″W	Regina municipality (7056)		Upload Photo
2320 Lorne Street	2320 Lorne Street; Regina SK	50°26′31″N 104°36′49″W	Regina municipality (10758)		Upload Photo
2528 Retallack Street	2528 Retallack Street; Regina SK	50°26′21″N 104°37′21″W	Regina municipality (6148)		Upload Photo
Last Mountain Lake Bird Sanctuary National Historic Site of Canada	Regina SK	51°21′06″N 105°14′24″W	Federal (13003)	Q18555478	Upload Photo
St. Matthew's Anglican Church	2165 Winnipeg Street; Regina SK	50°26′00″N 104°35′02″W	Regina municipality (13887)		
Leader Building	1853 Hamilton Street; Regina SK	50°27′00″N 104°36′32″W	Regina municipality (1133)		
Diocese of Qu'Appelle	College Avenue; Regina SK	50°26′25″N 104°36′14″W	Saskatchewan (1312)		
Canada Life Assurance Building	2201 - 11th Avenue; Regina SK	50°27′01″N 104°36′47″W	Saskatchewan (1336)	Q130551593	More images
Federal Building	1975 Scarth Street; Regina SK	50°26′51″N 104°36′39″W	Federal (4265)		
Land Titles Building	2205 Victoria Avenue; Regina SK	50°26′50″N 104°36′47″W	Saskatchewan (1337)	Q102227833	More images
Northern Crown Bank	1819 Scarth Street; Regina SK	50°26′59″N 104°36′40″W	Saskatchewan (1342)	Q130551605	More images
Saskatchewan Government Telephones Head Office	2340 Albert Street; Regina SK	50°26′28″N 104°36′58″W	Saskatchewan (2069)		
Balfour Apartments	2305 Victoria Avenue; Regina SK	50°26′50″N 104°36′50″W	Saskatchewan (2875), Regina municipality (2709)	Q102457137	More images
Regina Telephone Exchange	1870 Lorne Street; Regina SK	50°26′56″N 104°36′50″W	Saskatchewan (2776)	Q102424813	More images
Union Station	1880 Saskatchewan Drive; Regina SK	50°27′10″N 104°36′29″W	Federal (6706), Saskatchewan (2782)	Q5048872	More images
Saskatchewan Revenue Building	1871 Smith Street; Regina SK	50°26′57″N 104°36′54″W	Saskatchewan (2878)	Q102474458	More images
2216 Lorne Street	2216 Lorne Street; Regina SK	50°26′37″N 104°36′50″W	Regina municipality (3002)		
Hutcheson Residence	2200 Montague Street; Regina SK	50°26′38″N 104°37′47″W	Regina municipality (16369)		Upload Photo
Qu'Appelle Apartments	2105 Hamilton Street; Regina SK	50°26′43″N 104°36′29″W	Regina municipality (3004)	Q131740236	More images
Motherwell Building	1901 Victoria Avenue; Regina SK	50°26′51″N 104°36′29″W	Regina municipality (3005)		Upload Photo
Willoughby and Duncan Building	1839-51 Scarth Street; Regina SK	50°26′59″N 104°36′40″W	Regina municipality (3068)		
Travellers Building	1833-43 Broad Street; Regina SK	50°26′59″N 104°35′42″W	Regina municipality (3069)		
Mitchell Building	1852/56 Scarth Street; Regina SK	50°26′57″N 104°36′40″W	Regina municipality (3071)		
Armstrong, Smyth and Dowswell Building	1834 Scarth Street; Regina SK	50°26′57″N 104°36′40″W	Regina municipality (3073)	Q102485968	More images
1901-14th Avenue	1901 14th Avenue; Regina SK	50°26′38″N 104°36′29″W	Regina municipality (3085)		
2330 15th Avenue	2330 15th Avenue; Regina SK	50°26′33″N 104°36′54″W	Regina municipality (3086)		
1820 Cornwall Street	1820 Cornwall Street; Regina SK	50°26′58″N 104°36′43″W	Regina municipality (5775)		
2305 Cornwall Street	2305 Cornwall Street; Regina SK	50°26′25″N 104°36′40″W	Regina municipality (5822)		
St. Paul's Cathedral	1861 McIntyre Street; Regina SK	50°26′49″N 104°36′58″W	Regina municipality (5823)		
2201 14th Avenue	2201 14th Avenue; Regina SK	50°26′46″N 104°36′50″W	Regina municipality (6395)		
Knox-Metropolitan United Church	2340 Victoria Avenue; Regina SK	50°26′51″N 104°36′50″W	Regina municipality (7044)	Q6423506	More images
2326 College Avenue	2326 College Avenue; Regina SK	50°26′28″N 104°36′54″W	Regina municipality (7045)		
2125 Victoria Avenue	2125 Victoria Avenue; Regina SK	50°26′48″N 104°36′43″W	Regina municipality (7053)	Q5911949	More images
2020 - 11th Avenue	2020 11th Avenue; Regina SK	50°27′18″N 104°36′40″W	Regina municipality (10757)		Upload Photo
1503 Victoria Avenue	1503 Victoria Avenue; Regina SK	50°26′49″N 104°36′07″W	Regina municipality (11857)		Upload Photo
2220 Lorne Street	2220 Lorne Street; Regina SK	50°26′37″N 104°36′22″W	Regina municipality (11921)		
1400 College Avenue	1400 College Avenue; Regina SK	50°26′28″N 104°36′04″W	Regina municipality (11922)		Upload Photo
Donahue Building	2300 11th Avenue; Regina SK	50°27′18″N 104°37′01″W	Regina municipality (13886)		
Strathdee Warehouse	2206 Dewdney Avenue; Regina SK	50°27′19″N 104°36′47″W	Regina municipality (1293)		
John Deere Plow Company Limited Building	1275 Broad Street; Regina SK	50°27′31″N 104°36′22″W	Regina municipality (3072)		
2128/2132 Dewdney Avenue	2128/32 Dewdney Avenue; Regina SK	50°27′19″N 104°36′43″W	Regina municipality (5832)		Upload Photo
1150 Rose Street	1150 Rose Street; Regina SK	50°27′36″N 104°36′29″W	Regina municipality (6397)		Upload Photo
Saskatchewan Legislative Building and Grounds National Historic Site of Canada	2405 Legislative Drive; Regina SK	50°25′59″N 104°36′54″W	Federal (13054), Saskatchewan (3764)	Q3579114	More images
Albert Memorial Bridge	Albert Street; Regina SK	50°25′59″N 104°37′01″W	Regina municipality (5804)	Q4710833	More images
Old Post Office-City Hall	1801 Scarth Street; Regina SK	50°27′00″N 104°36′39″W	Regina municipality (6147)	Q7243889	More images
Queen Building	1200 Broad Avenue South; Regina SK	50°26′04″N 104°36′21″W	Federal (9543)		Upload Photo
Royal Canadian Mounted Police Depot, A Block	3 Dewdney Ave. Regina SK	50°26′56″N 104°40′26″W	Federal (16701)		Upload Photo
RCMP Training Academy - B Block	6101 Dewdney Ave. West; Regina SK	50°27′15″N 104°40′05″W	Federal (19447)		Upload Photo
RCMP Training Academy - C Block	6101 Dewdney Ave. West; Regina SK	50°27′15″N 104°40′02″W	Federal (19468)		Upload Photo
Regina Armoury	1600 Elphinstone Avenue; Regina SK	50°27′10″N 104°37′52″W	Federal (9583)		Upload Photo
Whitmore Warehouse	1708 8th Avenue; Regina SK	50°27′24″N 104°36′19″W	Regina municipality (16291)		Upload Photo
2812 McCallum Avenue	2812 McCallum Avenue; Regina SK	50°25′54″N 104°37′16″W	Regina municipality (6396)		
2990 Albert Street	2990 Albert Street; Regina SK	50°25′52″N 104°37′08″W	Regina municipality (7046)		
217 Angus Crescent	217 Angus Crescent; Regina SK	50°26′23″N 104°38′24″W	Regina municipality (10816)		Upload Photo
Government House, Regina	4607 Dewdney Avenue; Regina SK	50°27′17″N 104°38′49″W	Saskatchewan (2775)	Q5588909	More images
Territorial Administration Building	3304 Dewdney Avenue; Regina SK	50°27′19″N 104°37′44″W	Saskatchewan (2777)	Q131566934	More images
Albert Public Library	1401 Robinson Street; Regina SK	50°26′37″N 104°37′23″W	Regina municipality (5577)		More images
Connaught Library	3435 13th Avenue; Regina SK	50°26′37″N 104°37′48″W	Regina municipality (5584)		Upload Photo
269 Leopold Crescent	269 Leopold Crescent; Regina SK	50°26′18″N 104°37′26″W	Regina municipality (5839)		Upload Photo
Kenora Apartments	2601 14th Avenue; Regina SK	50°26′39″N 104°37′08″W	Regina municipality (6145)		Upload Photo
2915 14th Avenue	2915 14th Avenue; Regina SK	50°26′39″N 104°37′23″W	Regina municipality (6146)		Upload Photo
Beta Apartments	2925 14th Avenue; Regina SK	50°26′38″N 104°37′23″W	Regina municipality (6154)		Upload Photo
Henderson Terrace	3038 to 3060 18th Avenue; Regina SK	50°26′18″N 104°37′30″W	Regina municipality (7043)		Upload Photo
3225 - 13th Avenue	3225 13th Avenue; Regina SK	50°26′43″N 104°37′41″W	Regina municipality (7054)		Upload Photo
3025 - 13th Avenue	3025 13th Avenue; Regina SK	50°26′43″N 104°37′30″W	Regina municipality (7055)		Upload Photo
Government House National Historic Site of Canada	4601 Dewdney Avenue; Regina SK	50°27′18″N 104°38′49″W	Federal (7620)	Q5588909	More images
Albert Cook Row Houses	2008-2018 Athol Street; Regina SK	50°26′49″N 104°37′41″W	Regina municipality (10759)		Upload Photo
1862 Retallack Street	1862 Retallack Street; Regina SK	50°26′57″N 104°37′23″W	Regina municipality (10760)		Upload Photo
223 Leopold Crescent	223 Leopold Crescent; Regina SK	50°26′16″N 104°37′19″W	Regina municipality (10815)		Upload Photo
Simson Residence	205 Leopold Crescent; Regina SK	50°26′29″N 104°37′26″W	Regina municipality (13888)		Upload Photo
Sherwood Department Store	2006 Albert Street; Regina SK	50°26′50″N 104°37′05″W	Regina municipality (1294)		Upload Photo
Royal Canadian Mounted Police Depot, Gymnasium and Pool	9 Dewdney Avenue; Regina SK	50°27′08″N 104°39′50″W	Federal (9852)		Upload Photo
Royal Canadian Mounted Police Depot, Drill Hall	Regina SK	50°26′59″N 104°39′50″W	Federal (10071)		Upload Photo
Royal Canadian Mounted Police Depot, Chapel	Dewdney Avenue; Regina SK	50°26′58″N 104°40′16″W	Federal (15982)		Upload Photo
Thornton Residence	2341 McIntyre Street; Regina SK	50°26′30″N 104°36′50″W	Regina municipality (16290)		Upload Photo

== See also ==
- List of National Historic Sites of Canada in Saskatchewan
