= Morton MacAuley =

Canadian politician

Morton W. Macauley
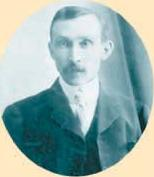

Alderman on the Edmonton City Council
- In office December 10, 1906 – August 6, 1907

Personal details
- Education: Dalhousie University
- Profession: Medical doctor

Morton W. MacAuley, usually known as M. W. MacAuley was a politician in Alberta, Canada and a municipal councillor in Edmonton.

== Biography ==
MacAuley was born in Inverness County, Nova Scotia on Cape Breton. He studied medicine at Dalhousie University, and worked as a surgeon in Halifax and practiced medicine in Pictou County for ten years before coming to Edmonton. He ran in the 1906 Edmonton election, and was elected to a one-year term as alderman on Edmonton City Council by finishing fifth of twelve candidates. He resigned eight months into his term, on August 6, 1907, and did not re-enter politics thereafter.
