= Belle Rive, Edmonton =

Belle Rive
- Neighbourhood
- Location of Belle Rive in Edmonton
- Coordinates: 53.623°N 113.475°W
- Country: Canada
- Province: Alberta
- City: Edmonton
- Quadrant: NW
- Ward: tastawiyiniwak
- Sector: North
- Area: Lake District

Government
  - Administrative body: Edmonton City Council
  - Councillor: Karen Principe

Area
  - Total: 1.17 km^{2} (0.45 sq mi)
- Elevation: 683 m (2,241 ft)

Population (2012)
  - Total: 3,945
  - Density: 3,371.8/km^{2} (8,733/sq mi)
  - Change (2009–12): ▲0.6%
  - Dwellings: 1,182

Belle Rive is a residential neighbourhood in north Edmonton, Alberta, Canada.

It is bounded on the north by 167 Avenue, on the south by 153 Avenue, and on the east by 82 Street. The western boundary, which it shares with Eaux Claires runs along a line located between 89 Street and 90 Street.

Housing in the neighbourhood is a mixture of single-family dwellings (93%), duplexes (4%) and row houses (3%). Substantially all residences in the neighbourhood are owner-occupied.

The neighbourhood was initially intended to be named Belle Riva, to honour the city's large Italian community, however the spelling error was never corrected.

== Demographics ==
In the City of Edmonton's 2012 municipal census, Belle Rive had a population of 3,945 living in 1,182 dwellings, a 0.6% change from its 2009 population of 3,921. With a land area of 1.17 km^{2} (0.45 sq mi), it had a population density of 3,371.8 people/km^{2} in 2012.
