= Griesbach, Edmonton =

Griesbach
- Neighbourhood
- Location of Griesbach in Edmonton
- Coordinates: 53.607°N 113.501°W
- Country: Canada
- Province: Alberta
- City: Edmonton
- Quadrant: NW
- Ward: Anirniq
- Sector: North

Government
  - MP: Kerry Diotte
  - MLA: David Eggen
  - Councillor: Karen Principe

Area
  - Total: 2.69 km^{2} (1.04 sq mi)
- Elevation: 677 m (2,221 ft)

Population (2016)
  - Total: 4,714
  - Density: 1,752.4/km^{2} (4,539/sq mi)
  - Change (2014–16): ▲24.6%
  - Dwellings: 1,754

Griesbach is a developing community in Edmonton, Alberta, Canada. This mainly residential neighbourhood was formerly the site of the CFB Griesbach military base and is named after William Griesbach. The land was transferred to Canada Lands Company to redevelop it. It remains a project of the Crown corporation.

The neighbourhood is bounded on the north by 153 Avenue, on the east by 97 Street, on the south by 137 Avenue, and on the west by Castle Downs Road. Travel north along 97 Street provides access to the current CFB Edmonton. Travel south along 97 Street provides access to the downtown core and the Northern Alberta Institute of Technology. The area is expected to be accessible by the Metro Line LRT in the future.

Shopping and services are available just east of the neighbourhood at Northgate Centre and North Town Centre. Both malls are located at the intersection of 137 Avenue and 97 Street at Griesbach's south east corner.

The community is represented by the Griesbach Community League.

== Demography ==
According to the City of Edmonton's 2005 municipal census, the most common type of residence in Griesbach were single-family dwellings. These accounted for four out of ten (41%) of all residences in the neighbourhood. Row houses accounted for another three out of ten (30%) of residences. Duplexes accounted for the remaining three out of ten (29%). Nine out of every ten (91%) were rented with only one in ten (9%) being owner occupied.

In the 2016 municipal census, Griesbach had a population of 4,714 living in 1,754 dwellings, a 24.6% change from its 2014 population of 3,752. With a land area of 2.69 km^{2} (1.04 sq mi), it had a population density of 1,752.4 people/km^{2} in 2016.

== See also ==
- CFB Griesbach
- Edmonton Federation of Community Leagues
