= Cameron Anderson (politician) =

Canadian politician (1857–1926)

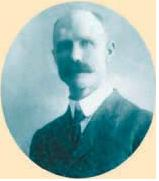

Alderman on the Edmonton City Council
- In office December 10, 1906 – December 14, 1908

Personal details
- Born: May 1857 Canada
- Died: March 23, 1926 (aged 68) Edmonton, Alberta, Canada
- Resting place: Edmonton Municipal Cemetery; Edmonton, Alberta, Canada
- Spouse: Merran McLean
- Profession: Contractor

Cameron Anderson (May 1857 – March 22, 1926) was a politician in Alberta, Canada and a municipal councillor in Edmonton.

== Biography ==
Anderson came to Edmonton prior to 1901 from North Dakota. Anderson was a long-time Edmonton resident and a building contractor. In the 1906 municipal election he was elected to a two-year term on Edmonton City Council as an alderman, placing fourth of twelve candidates. He sought re-election in the 1908 election, but finished seventh of thirteen candidates in an election in which there were only six vacancies. He did not seek political office thereafter.

Anderson died at noon on March 23, 1926, after contacting pneumonia. He was survived by his wife, Merran, four daughters and a son, and William Anderson, his brother.
