= Schonsee, Edmonton =

Schonsee
- Neighbourhood
- Location of Schonsee in Edmonton
- Coordinates: 53.633°N 113.455°W
- Country: Canada
- Province: Alberta
- City: Edmonton
- Quadrant: NW
- Ward: tastawiyiniwak
- Sector: North
- Area: Lake District

Government
  - Administrative body: Edmonton City Council
  - Councillor: Karen Principe

Area
  - Total: 1.24 km^{2} (0.48 sq mi)
- Elevation: 687 m (2,254 ft)

Population (2012)
  - Total: 1,712
  - Density: 1,380.6/km^{2} (3,576/sq mi)
  - Change (2009–12): ▲84.1%
  - Dwellings: 679

Schonsee is a new neighbourhood in north east Edmonton, Alberta, Canada. It is bounded on the south by 167 Avenue, on the east by 66 Street, and on the west by 82 Street. To the north is an undeveloped rural area of Edmonton.

As of October 27, 2007, the City of Edmonton map utility contained virtually no data on this area. As this area develops, more data should become available.

== Demographics ==
In the City of Edmonton's 2012 municipal census, Schonsee had a population of 1,712 living in 679 dwellings, an 84.1% change from its 2009 population of 930. With a land area of 1.24 km^{2} (0.48 sq mi), it had a population density of 1,380.6 people/km^{2} in 2012.
