= Northgate Centre =

- Location: Edmonton, Alberta, Canada
- Coordinates: 53°35′53″N 113°29′19″W
- Opened: 1965
- Manager: Adam Elsafadi
- Owner: First Capital Realty
- Num. of stores: Over 70
- Num. of anchor tenants: 2
- Floor area: 511,000 square feet (47,500 m^{2})
- Floors: 2
- Parking: 1,800
- Public transit: Northgate Transit Centre
- Website: northgatecentre.ca

Northgate Centre is a shopping mall located in the northern part of Edmonton, Alberta. It contains more than 70 stores and services. Its main anchor tenants are Safeway and Walmart.

== History ==
The mall first opened in April 1965 as Northgate Shopping Centre and was home to the Woodward's department store. A major renovation was completed in 1986, adding a second story and twin two-level parkades on the northwest and southwest corners, and the mall was renamed Northwood Mall. In 1994, Kmart opened a new larger location after closing at North Town Mall; however, this store would not last long, as it closed in 1998, and Zellers opened in its space. The same year, First Capital Realty took ownership of the mall and a year later began a three-year redevelopment that was completed in 2002. The project included new locations for existing tenants Future Shop and Safeway, expanded space for Zellers, and a refurbished second-floor food court. The name was changed to Northgate Centre.

In 2007, during neighboring North Town Mall's redevelopment, McDonald's relocated to the Northgate Centre food court after its original North Town location was closed and demolished. In 2011, Walmart announced that it had acquired the lease for the location of the Zellers anchor store, which subsequently closed. In October 2012, the Walmart Supercentre opened. In the same year, Sport Mart closed to become Ardene. In the next year, Lammle's Western Wear and Tackle closed, and Rexall opened in its former space the same year. Subsequently, the Service Canada location was closed. On March 28, 2015, the Future Shop closed. In 2017, Game City, a local video game store, moved from Londonderry Mall to Northgate, and Marshalls opened in Future Shop's former space the same year. In May 2018, the Rexall location closed, as well as the Chili's outparcel the same year. Game City relocated to a former Coles in 2019. Around 2019-2020, the mall's McDonald's relocated to a new outparcel from the food court, returning to an outparcel location. In 2020, Healthcare Solutions relocated to Rexall's former space, and in its former location, Dollarama opened, now having two Dollarama stores across from each other in the area, with one in North Town Centre across 137 Ave. In 2024, Clare Beauty Supply opened; however, Ardene closed, and Game City relocated back to Londonderry Mall. Safeway also underwent a renovation. In 2025, Wing Snob opened in the former M&M Meat Shops location, Smitty's closed, the mall's parking garage was demolished, Healthcare Solutions relocated again into Ardene's former location and Marshalls moved to North Town Centre on October 6. In 2026, Canada Computers opened in the former Healthcare Solutions/Rexall and Chick-fil-A is planned to open on former site of the Chili's outparcel.

== Gallery ==
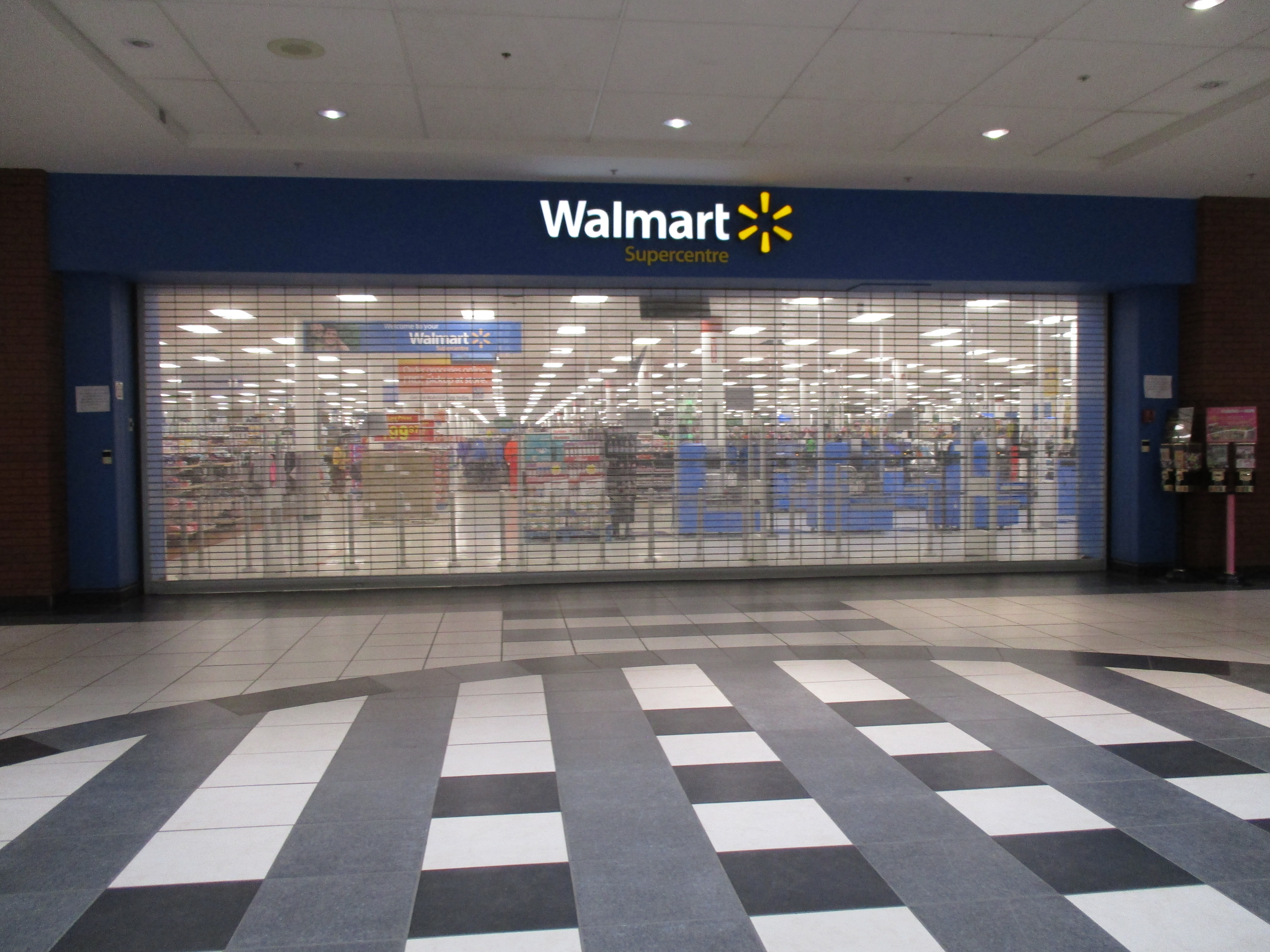
Walmart

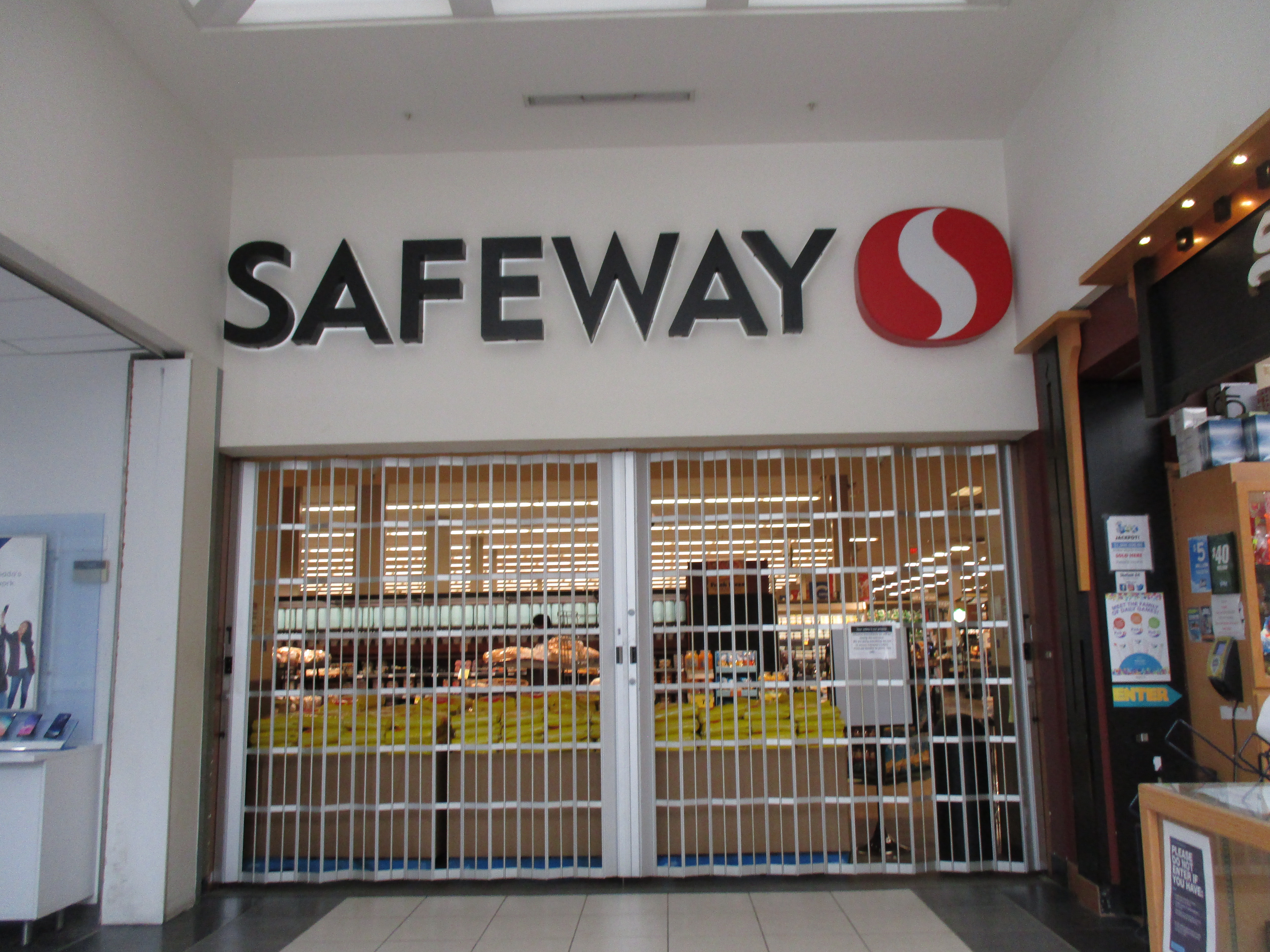
Safeway

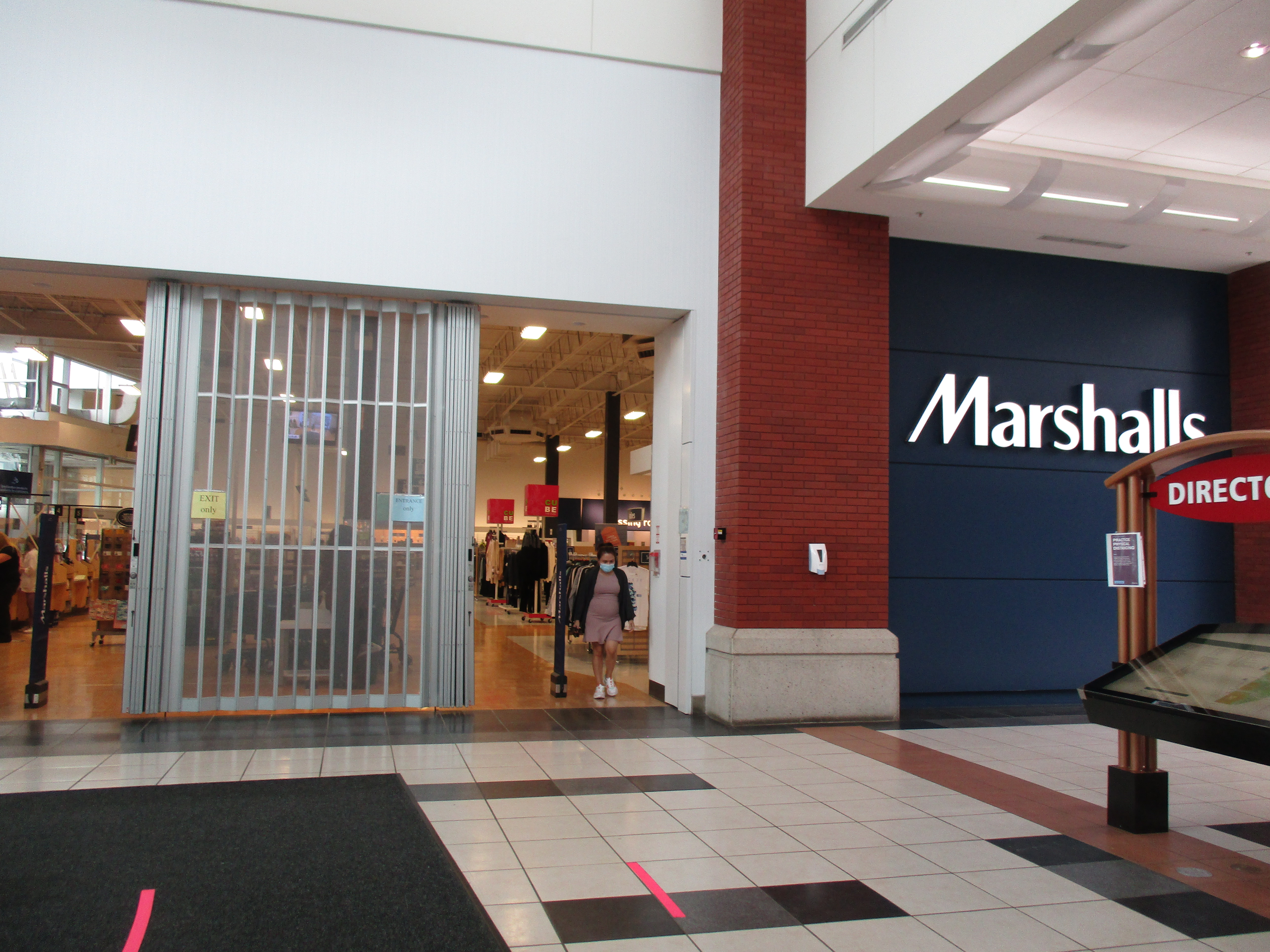
Former Marshalls

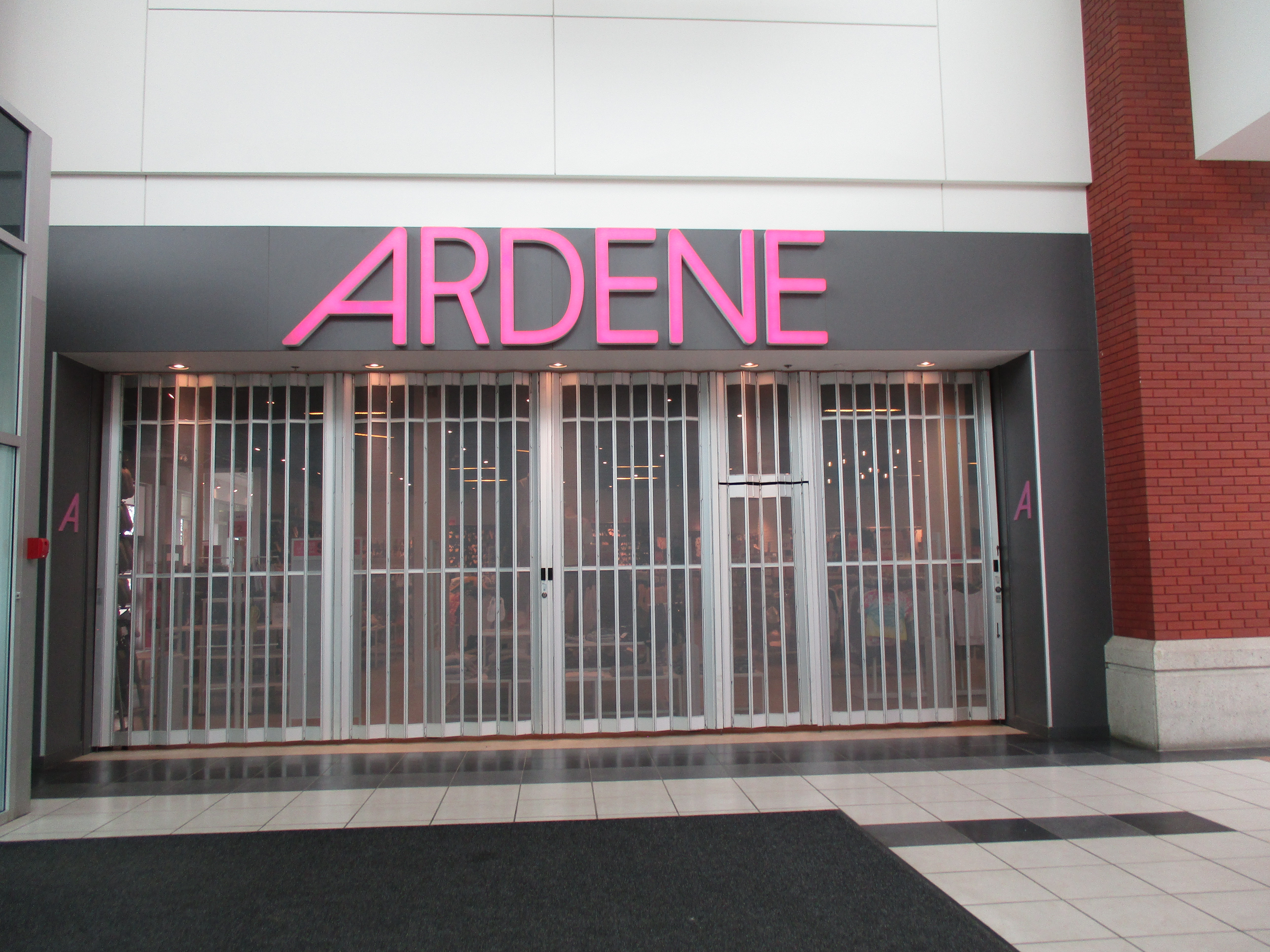
Former Ardene
