= North Town Centre =

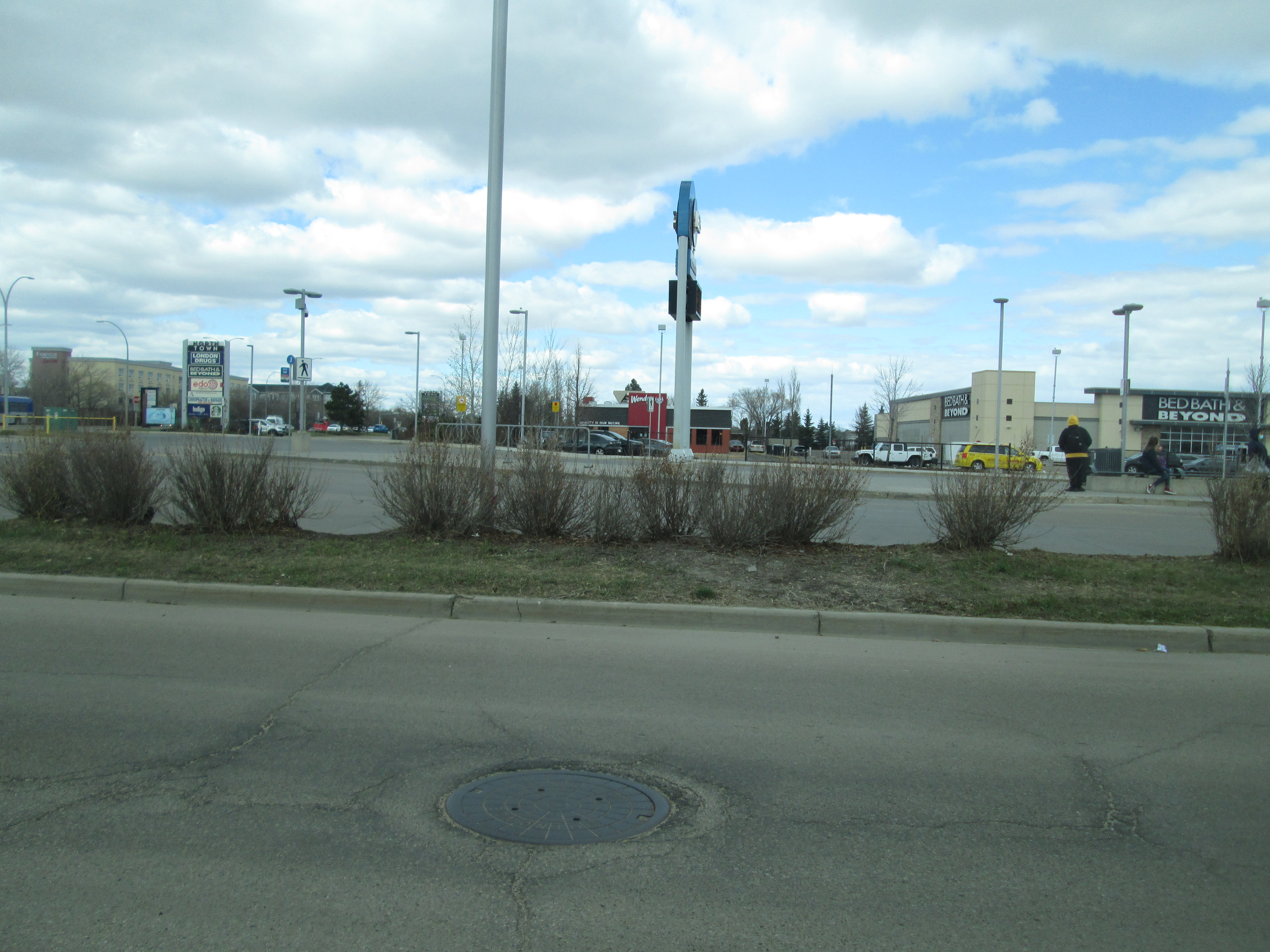
- The west end of North Town Centre in 2021.
- Location: Edmonton, Alberta, Canada
- Coordinates: 53°36′03″N 113°29′20″W
- Opened: May 26, 1976
- Previous names: North Town Mall (1976–2009)
- Developer: Triple Five Group
- Manager: Anthem Properties
- Owner: Anthem Properties
- Num. of stores: Over 31
- Num. of anchor tenants: 4
- Floor area: 255,952 square feet (23,778.7 m^{2})
- Floors: 2
- Public transit: Northgate Transit Centre
- Website: northtowncentre.com

North Town Centre is a shopping centre located in the northern part of Edmonton, Alberta, Canada. Major tenants include Indigo Books and Music, London Drugs, Marshalls, Dollarama, PetSmart, Miniso, and T&T Supermarket.

== History ==
In February 1974, Triple Five Group proposed a 200,000 square feet (19,000 m^{2}) shopping centre at 137 Avenue between 93 and 97 Street, just north of Northgate Centre. The following month, the City of Edmonton signed an agreement with Triple Five in which the city agreed to sell three acres of land to the developer, that Triple Five pay a 10 percent interest on the land, and that preliminary work could start on the site prior to the land transfer. Preliminary construction work began shortly after but a stop work order was issued due to Triple Five not satisfying the terms of the March agreement which included owning over $1 million in development fees to the city. The city initially denied a 45-day extension requested by Triple Five to pay the fees but was later reduced to 30 days. Triple Five faced a potential second stop work order in January 1975 after failing to pay the money owed following the expiration of the extension. Construction resumed in June of that year after financial issues were resolved and that the mall would be a joint venture between Triple Five and Batoni-Bowlen Enterprises.

The mall, then-called North Town Mall, officially opened on May 26, 1976 with Kmart, Beaver Home Centre, Consumers Distributing, IGA, London Drugs, and McDonald's as the major tenants. The mall's second floor, containing medical, dental, and law offices, opened the following month. In 1977, a pedestrian overpass over 137 Avenue was proposed to connect the mall with Northgate Centre. An office addition to the mall was approved in 1979 on the condition the pedway must be connected to it but the latter was not constructed for unknown reasons. On April 1, 1988, the mall was purchased by Toronto-based Northtown Mall Investments and underwent a three-year, $1.5 million renovation that included new exterior canopies and upgrades to the second floor. In August 1994, Kmart closed after moving to a larger location in Northgate Centre.

In May 2006, Anthem Properties purchased the property and in the following year, began a two-year redevelopment that saw North Town converted from an enclosed mall to a power-centre-style mall and expanded to 270,000 sq ft (25,000 m^{2}) with new buildings pads built in its parking lot. Existing tenants such as CIBC, Rogers Plus, Wendy's, and the professional offices on the second floor would remain where they are. Work on the first phase was completed in April 2008 with opening of the re-built London Drugs store. The mall was also re-branded as North Town Centre to coincide with the project. The mall's redevelopment was completed in the summer of 2009 with the opening of Edmonton's first Bed Bath & Beyond (at the space formerly occupied by Save-On-Foods) in June 2009, following by the city's second T&T Supermarket location and an Indigo Books and Music in July 2009. In 2023, Bed Bath & Beyond closed after its parent company filed for bankruptcy protection. Marshalls moved across from Northgate Centre in the former Bed Bath & Beyond on October 6, 2025.

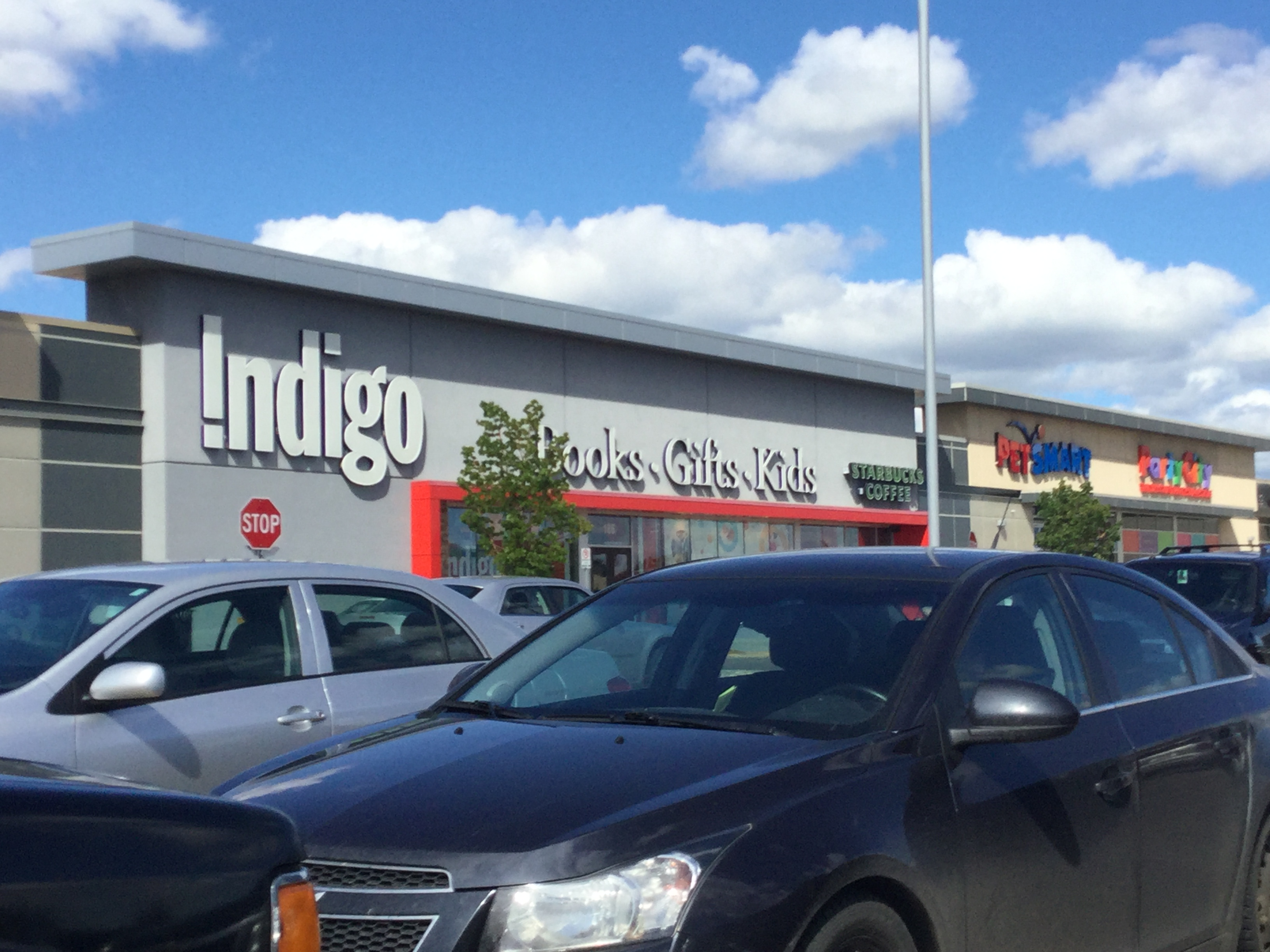
Indigo at North Town Centre in 2017, along with PetSmart and the former Party City

== Transit ==
The Northgate Transit Centre is located on the northeast corner of 137 Avenue and 97 Street in front of the mall.
