= 1913 Edmonton municipal election =

Municipal election in Alberta, Canada

The 1913 municipal election was held December 8, 1913 to elect a mayor and five aldermen to sit on Edmonton City Council, trustees to sit on the public school board, and four trustees to sit on the separate school board.

There were ten aldermen on city council, but five of the positions were already filled: Hugh Calder, Joseph Driscoll, James East, Gustave May, and Harry Smith had all been elected to two-year terms in 1912 and were still in office. Each voter could cast up to five votes - the system used was Plurality block voting.

There were eight trustees on the public school board, but three of the positions were already filled: Alex Butchart, K W MacKenzie, and J J McKenzie had been elected to two-year terms in 1912. The election of five trustees in 1913 would bring the board's size to eight, an increase from seven. To keep an equal number of trustees elected each year, L D Parney was acclaimed to a one-year term.

There were seven positions on the separate board, but three of them were already filled: Wilfrid Gariépy, M J O'Farrell, and Milton Martin had been acclaimed to two-year terms in 1912, and were still in office. The election of four trustees in 1913 would bring the board's size to seven, an increase from six.

The 1913 election was the first election in Edmonton's history to see an incumbent mayor defeated. It is also the closest mayoral race in the city's history as measured by percentage of the vote, although the absolute difference in votes between candidates in the 1903 election was smaller.

== Voter turnout ==
8916 voters cast ballots. There were 27672 eligible voters, for a voter turnout of 32.2%.

== Results ==
- **bold** indicates elected
- italics indicate incumbent
- South Side indicates representative for Edmonton's South Side, with a minimum South Side representation instituted after the city of Strathcona, south of the North Saskatchewan River, amalgamated into Edmonton on February 1, 1912.

=== Mayoral election ===
- **William J. McNamara - 4,376 (50.21%)**
- William Short - 4,340 (49.79%)

=== Aldermanic election ===
Aldermanic election conducted using Plurality block voting. Each voter could cast up to five votes.

- **Joseph Clarke** - 3617 (elected)
- **Alexander Campbell** - 3559 (elected)
- **Rice Sheppard** - 3525 (elected) (south side)
- **J. A. Kinney** - 3319 (union support) (South Side) (elected)*
- **Robert Douglas** - 3288 (elected)
- **J.R. McIntosh** - 3287
- **Dr. Campbell** - 2850
- **C. Gowan** - 2790
- **A.T. Mode** - 2788
- **T.J. Walsh** - 2707
- **S.H.Smith** - 2730
- **John Cook** - 1037

Total number of votes cast in aldermanic contest: 34,994 All elected were white males.

- James Kinney was the first alderman elected with direct labour union endorsement, from the Edmonton Trades and Labour Council. James East and Rice Sheppard had been previously elected but although holding pro-labour views had not been actual Labour candidates.

=== Public school board election ===
Five trustees were elected. Each voter could cast up to five votes (Plurality block voting).

- **Walter Ramsey** - 4111 (elected)
- **A E May** - 3343 (elected)
- **J Hill** - 3287 (elected)
- **Samuel Barnes** - 3173 (elected)
- **Dr. Park** - 2583 (elected)
- **Dr. Frank Crang** - 2314
- **T.H. Miller** - 1645
- **Louise Moore** - 1491
- **Alice Hill** - 867

=== Separate (Catholic) school board election ===
Each voter could cast up to three votes.

- **Joseph Henri Picard** - 448 (elected)
- **J O'Neill** - 321 (elected)
- **D J Gilmurray** - 310 (elected)
- **E P O'Donnell** - 262 (elected)
- **J.W. Heffernan** - 248
- **J.W. Connelly** - 230
