= 1915 Edmonton municipal election =

Municipal election in Alberta, Canada

The 1915 municipal election was held December 13, 1915 to elect a mayor and five aldermen to sit on Edmonton City Council and four trustees to sit on each of the public and separate school boards.

There were ten aldermen on city council, but five of the positions were already filled: Hugh Calder, R N Frith, Joseph Henri Picard, James Ramsey, and Samuel Williamson were all elected to two-year terms in 1914 and were still in office.

There were seven trustees on the public school board, but three of the positions were already filled: Charles Gibbs, J J McKenzie, and William Rea had been elected to two-year terms in 1914. The same was true of the separate board, where A H Esch, Joseph Gariépy, and M J O'Farrell were continuing.

== Electoral System ==
The election of mayor was conducted by First past the post.

The election of aldermen was conducted through Plurality block voting, with each voter having ability to cast as many as five votes, no more than one per candidate.

== Voter turnout ==
There were 7235 ballots cast out of 17990 eligible voters, for a voter turnout of 40.2%.

== Results ==
- **bold** indicates elected
- italics indicate incumbent
- Data for 1915 is unavailable regarding South Side representatives, instituted after the city of Strathcona, south of the North Saskatchewan River, amalgamated into Edmonton on February 1, 1912.

=== Mayor ===
William Thomas Henry was acclaimed for a second term as mayor.

=== Aldermen ===
Each successful candidate was elected to two-year term.

- **Robert Douglas** - 5,488
- **James Macfie MacDonald** - 3,504
- **Orlando Bush** - 3,339
- **Charles Wilson** - 3,300
- **William Campbell McArthur** - 2,933
- James Kinney - 2,857
- C C Tatham - 2,428
- Joseph Clarke - 1,633
- Joseph Driscoll - 1,523
- Rice Sheppard - 1,379
- H H Hull - 1,359
- Joseph Adair - 1,146
- Adevdat Boileau - 872
- Frederick C. Humberstone - 461

=== Public school trustees ===
- **Walter Ramsey** - 4180
- **Samuel Barnes** - 3942
- **Henry Douglas** - 3261
- **J A McPherson** - 3200
- W A Lewis - 2124
- J S Wright - 2010
- Avery Smith - 1353
- Amy Keane - 601
- Marion Seymour - 591

=== Separate (Catholic) school trustees ===
- **Joseph Henri Picard** - 444
- **I. Tremblay** - 404
- **Joseph O'Neill** - 389
- **M. J. Kelly** - 359

== Referendum ==
Following the election, city burgesses (property-owners) were asked if they endorsed the city operating the power plant or whether it should go into private hands. about 7000 voted in favour of privatization, 5000 against. As by-law did not receive two-thirds support, the city maintained its power plant. The City created a city-owned corporation, "EPCOR", in 1996.
