= December 1912 Edmonton municipal election =

Municipal election in Alberta, Canada

The second of two 1912 municipal elections was held December 9, 1912 to elect a mayor and five aldermen to sit on Edmonton City Council and three trustees to sit on each of the public and separate school boards.

There were, at the time, ten aldermen on city council, but five of them were already filled. Henry Douglas, John Tipton, John Lundy, and Thomas J. Walsh had been elected to two-year terms earlier in the year and were still in office. Charles Gowan had also been elected to a two-year term, but had resigned May 14 and had been replaced in a by-election by Alexander Livingstone, who was also still in office.

There were continuing members of both boards of trustees as well: Samuel Barnes, Frank Crang, B H Nichols, and Walter Ramsey were in the midst of two-year terms on the public board, while John Cashman, James Collisson, and Joseph Henri Picard were still in office on the public board.

The election of three trustees to the separate system brought the total number of separate trustees to six, where it had previously been five.

== Voter turnout ==
There were 6060 ballots cast out of 17000 eligible voters, for a voter turnout of 35.6%.

== Results ==
- **bold** indicates elected
- italics indicate incumbent
- South Side indicates representative for Edmonton's South Side, with a minimum South Side representation instituted after the city of Strathcona, south of the North Saskatchewan River, amalgamated into Edmonton on February 1, 1912.

=== Mayor ===
- **William Short** - 3732
- W J Magrath - 1220
- Joseph Clarke - 1111

=== Aldermen ===
Aldermanic election was conducted using Plurality block voting. Each voter could cast up to five votes. Most popular southside candidate was guaranteed election.

Elected

- **Harry Smith** - 3369
- **James East** - 2662 (re-elected)
- **Joseph Driscoll** - 2437
- **Gustave May** - 2128 (re-elected)
- **Hugh Calder** - 1162 (South Side)

not elected

- James Macfie MacDonald - 1475
- Alex Stuart - 1306
- Charles Gowan - 1223
- Samuel Williamson - 1120
- C B Beats - 958
- William Vogel - 881
- F M McQueen - 714
- William Campbell McArthur - 668
- F Sillitoe, of the Bricklayers' Union - 562
- E S McQuaid - 560
- William Murray - 466
- John Hoyle - 303

=== Public school trustees ===
Three to be elected

- **Kenneth W. MacKenzie** - 2,413
- **Alex Butchart** - 2390
- John Park - 2053
- **J G McKenzie** - 1930 (South Side)
- J M Clindinin - 1591
- Herbert Crawford - 1563
- D McLeod - 813

=== Separate (Catholic) school trustees ===
Wilfrid Gariépy, M J O'Farrell, and Milton Martin were acclaimed.
