= George S. Armstrong =

Canadian politician

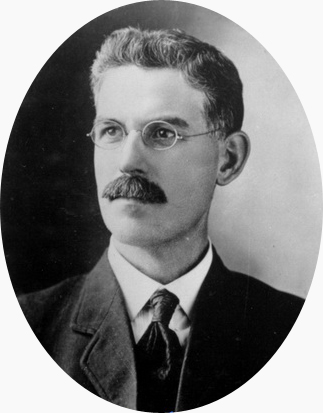

11th Mayor of Edmonton
- In office December 12, 1910 – December 9, 1912
- Preceded by: Robert Lee
- Succeeded by: William Short

Alderman on the Edmonton City Council
- In office December 9, 1907 – December 12, 1910

Personal details
- Born: May 16, 1867 Hopeville, Grey County, Canada West
- Died: June 9, 1947 (aged 80) Edmonton, Alberta, Canada
- Party: Conservative Party of Canada
- Spouses: Margaret Irene McFarlane (m. 1893, died) Jessie Mathieson (m. 1897)
- Children: 3
- Profession: Druggist, businessman

George Seale Armstrong (May 16, 1867 – June 9, 1947) was a Canadian businessman and politician. He served on the Edmonton City Council from 1907 to 1910 and as Mayor of Edmonton from 1910 to 1912.

Armstrong was born in what would soon become the province of Ontario in 1867. After briefly teaching school, he entered the business industry, as a druggist. After initially gaining experience in politics on the council of Eastnor Township, he relocated west to the city of Edmonton, Alberta. In Edmonton, he established his pharmaceutical business once again and worked briefly with his brother on real estate and construction projects. In 1907, he ran for election to the Edmonton City Council and was elected to a two-year term. In 1910, he decided to run for the mayoralty in the municipal election; uncontested as the only nominated candidate on election day, Armstrong was acclaimed to the mayor's chair for the upcoming year. During his term, several issues were brought up to attention, including the city's need of a new civic building and the possibility of two new gas plants for the city.

His first term as mayor also saw the issue of possible amalgamation of the "twin cities" of Edmonton and Strathcona, an issue that had been spoken of as a possibility in the previous few years. Approved by councils of both cities, a successful plebiscite was held, and bylaws permitting the merge were passed and Edmonton's annex of Strathcona came into effect in February 1912. Armstrong put his name up once again in the mayoral election mandated by the agreement and defeated his rival candidate, and thus became the first post-amalgamation mayor of the city of Edmonton. During his term, he introduced a new hospital, improvements to the street rail system, and commissioning a report on the expansion of the city. Another election was held later that December, and he did not stand for re-election.

Armstrong later gained employment with the Edmonton post office after leaving the office of mayor, in which he would later rise to the position of postmaster, which he served in for 14 years. Armstrong also operated his drug store once again. He remained at the post office until his retirement in 1937, and died ten years later in Edmonton at the age of 80.

== Early life and career ==
Armstrong was born in 1867 at Hopeville, Canada West, to William and Sarah (née Seale) Armstrong. After attending schools in Mount Forest, Ontario, Armstrong briefly became a schoolteacher before moving to Lion's Head, Ontario, where he entered the pharmacy business. Armstrong would also spend some time at Eastnor Township, Ontario, where he served on the town council and as treasurer, from 1903 to 1905. He then moved west and settle at the city of Edmonton, Alberta, in 1906. That same year he opened up the Armstrong Drug Store, on Namayo Avenue and Boyle Street (presently 97 Street and 103 Avenue). In his early years in Edmonton, he also involved himself in several real estate ventures and construction projects along with his brother, Gordon.

== Early political career ==
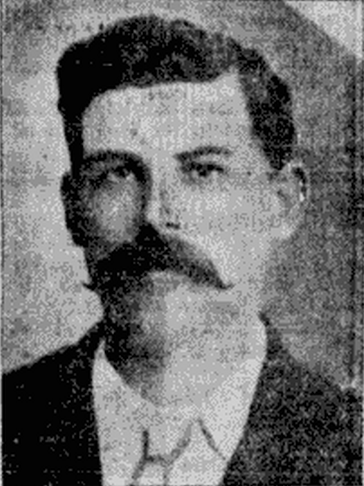
George Armstrong as pictured in a 1907 newspaper

In 1906, at a citizen's meeting at a local store, Armstrong's name was speculated as a possible candidate for alderman for the upcoming 1906 election. Armstrong, despite being a newcomer to the city, was open to the fact of running in the election, but ultimately did not run. Armstrong would however decide to run for council as an alderman in the 1907 election, on a platform based on assuring the availabilities of utilities to the people of Edmonton, as well as ensuring a sense of openness as a council to the people. During the time leading up to the election, he also voiced his opposition to the city's arbitrary divisions into sections. He was elected to council for a two-year term, receiving 774 votes, finishing second in a field of 12 candidates. Despite being a preferred candidate for the mayoralty in 1909, he opted to run for council instead and was re-elected for another two-year term in the 1909 election. In 1910, his name was once again speculated to run for the mayoralty of the city in the upcoming election, with many citizens approaching him to run. He later decided in favour of running, publishing an acceptance letter in the Edmonton Bulletin stating:

To the Electors of the City of Edmonton,
Ladies and Gentleman—At the request of a large number of ratepayers I have consented to be a candidate for Mayor at the coming municipal election. My platform and address to the elctorate will appear in the press in a few days.
Respectfully yours,.

— Geo. S. Armstrong

His platform would consist of the main points of leading the city out of debt, assuring the completion of city projects that were in progress before introducing news ones, and again, ensuring that utilities were available to everyone and were of high quality. He had also expressed desire to amalgamate the existing city of Edmonton with the city of Strathcona, which was divided from Edmonton by the North Saskatchewan River, situated on the south. Though former councillor William Harold Clark was urged to run by a group of citizens, Armstrong would be the only nominated mayoral candidate when nomination deadline day came, and thus he was acclaimed mayor; the first occurrence since Kenneth W. MacKenzie was acclaimed in 1900. Amongst his supporters for his candidacy were outgoing mayor Robert Lee and former mayor Charles May.

== First mayoral term, 1911 ==
During his first term as mayor, Armstrong oversaw many issues that concerned the city. In March 1911, he expressed his support for a new city hall building to be built, expressing his dissatisfaction with the existing building that housed the council and civic employees, mentioning the ever-expanding number of staff. Later in that year, a committee would be formed concerning the issue, and a new structure would be planned with a planned cost of one million dollars. In July of that same year, he would sign a bylaw that would allow an American entrepreneur to establish a gas plant in the city, an issue that had been presented to council for debate several months prior. Later that year, the prospect of a municipal gas plant would also be supplied to city council. In July 1911, when, along with the city council, he dismissed a pair of city commissioners after months of debate. The firing triggered a by-election when alderman James H. McKinley would resign in protest to the action. In 1911, he also served as a vice president of the Union of Alberta Municipalities. Involved in national and provincial affairs, he voiced his support for a canal to be constructed in the Georgian Bay of Lake Huron, stating that the presence of such canal would improve the trading relations of Canada with the United States by allowing an easier route between the two countries. He also was in favour of a hydroelectric project in the Athabasca River. Additionally, during this first term as mayor, Armstrong also oversaw the city's festivities on George V's coronation and moved to form a municipal purchasing department.

=== Amalgamation of Edmonton ===
Amalgamation plebiscite results
City	Yes	No
Edmonton	667	96
Strathcona	518	178

Another issue presented to council during his first term in office was that of potential amalgamation with the city south of the North Saskatchewan River, Strathcona. Regarding the issue, Armstrong would gauge public interest as in favour of it, stating he was "satisfied that [it] would carry". The particular issue had been in works as early as 1909, when draft versions of a bylaw permitting the two cities to join were presented to each respective city council, but serious talks had not begun until this particular year. Plans for the action were set out by negotiations of a committee of both cities, reaching an agreement with conditions including an election to be held after the amalgamation law takes place, a new bridge to be constructed over the river separating the two cities, and the expansion of the street rail system to cover the land of the unified cities. It was also hoped at the time that being a larger city would lower taxes. A plebiscite was held in both Edmonton and Strathcona on September 26, 1911, with results at both municipalities overwhelmingly in favour of the joining of the two "twin cities". With the law passed by council on December 19, 1911, and approved by the Legislative Assembly of Alberta, the amalgamation was set for February 1, 1912, with the first combined election to take place on February 16. The population of the new combined city would rise to over 40,000 people.

== Second term in office, 1912 ==
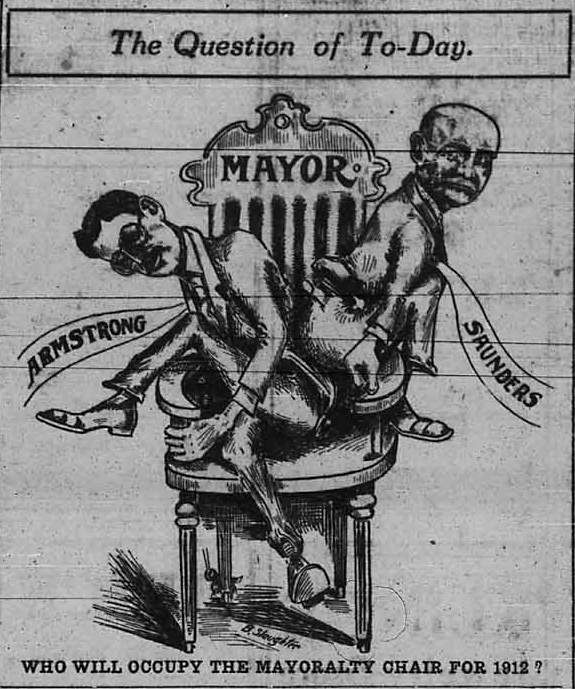
Cartoon that appeared Edmonton Bulletin on the morning of the 1912 election

Armstrong would later declare his candidacy for that particular election (the February 1912 Edmonton municipal election), for the position of what was referred to as the first mayor of "Greater Edmonton" Stating that in his belief, 1911 was one of the most successful years in the history of the city, he ran on the premise that he had unfinished work from his first term, stating, "I ask for a continuance of your confidence, support and influence to allow me an opportunity to complete those undertakings which are in the best interests of Greater Edmonton". His opponent, Bryce J. Saunders charged that the city had long lacked efficiency in its utilities, particular the water supply, which he believed in the public ownership of. Armstrong would later go on to defeat Saunders in the general election, 1791 votes to Saunders' 1072, a margin of just over 700, with a voter turnout of around 30 percent.

During his brief second term as mayor in 1912, Armstrong and council approved a plan to construct 110 miles of electric railway lines in the city, considered legislation permitting band concerts on Sundays, oversaw the opening of the Royal Alexandra Hospital, advocated for the availability of housing accommodations for all Edmontonians in the face of an influx of new settlers, and welcomed a visit from Governor General of Canada Prince Arthur, Duke of Connaught and Strathearn to the city, planning a grand celebration. It was also in 1912 that the Hudson's Bay Company put its Edmonton land holdings on the market, the first bridge across the North Saskatchewan River in the city's east end opened, and that Armstrong commissioned a master plan for the newly amalgamated city, from an American firm based out of Minneapolis named Morell and Nichols. Among the suggestions in the report was the recommendation for a civic square to be built, which was opened 53 years later as Sir Winston Churchill Square. In his final week as mayor, the retiring Armstrong delivered the city's annual report at an annual meeting, thanked the people of Edmonton for entrusting him as mayor, and advised his successor to be fiscally responsible; stating, "If a reckless administration gets in next year, Edmonton will become a city like I was in recently, where they could not borrow enough money to clean their streets." In the election held later that week, he would be succeeded by former mayor from 1901 to 1904, William Short, whom he supported and campaigned for. Armstrong was later honoured with an informal gathering in the city council chamber where he was presented with a gift of silverware; with the city fire chief proclaiming that "Mayor Armstrong is bound to become a historical character".

== Post mayoral career ==
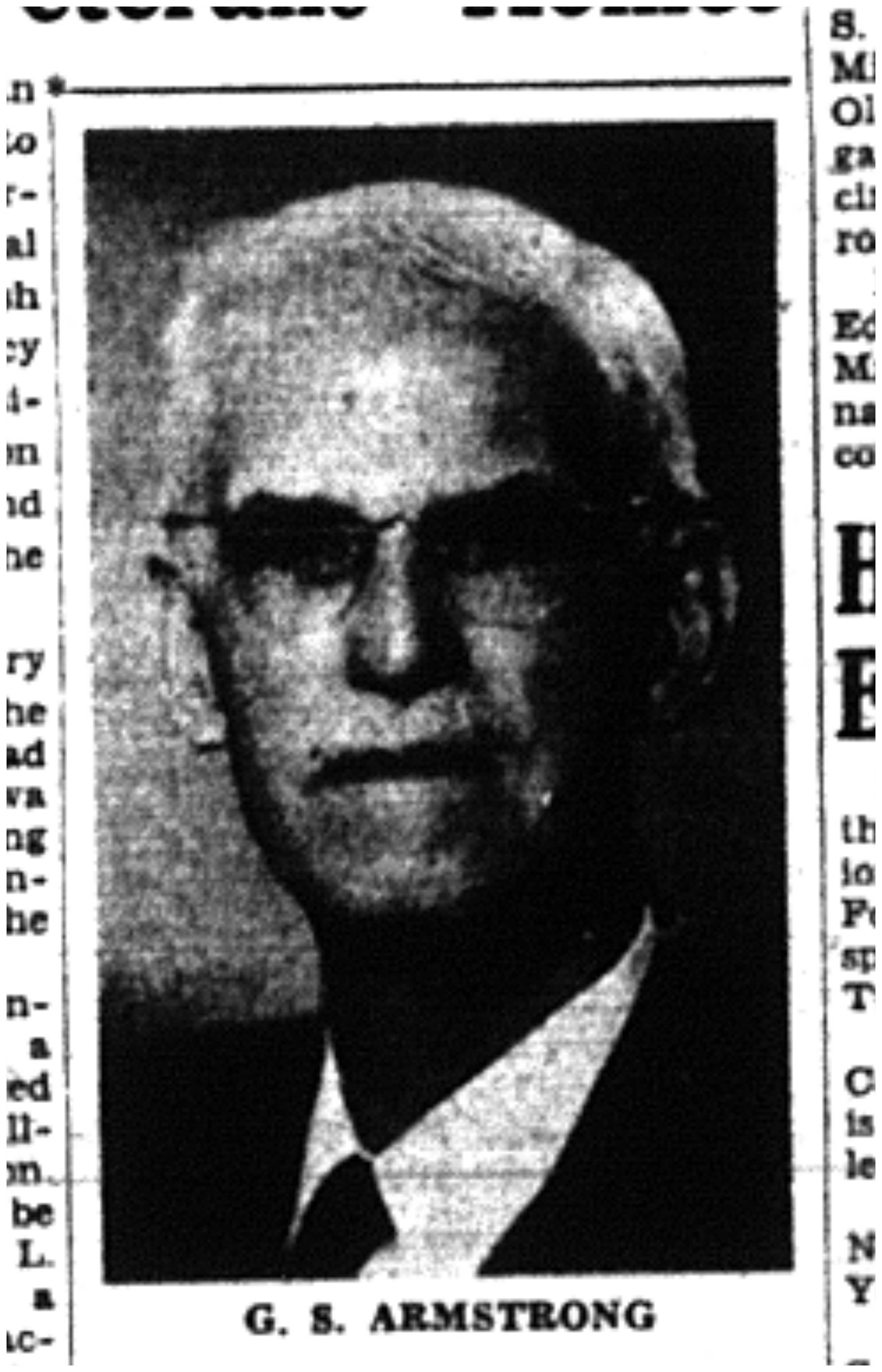
Armstrong pictured in his later years

The year after he left office as mayor, Armstrong began work with the Edmonton post office. After being recommended for the position by city notables, he was named postmaster of the city on November 12, 1913. In the same year he oversaw the construction of a new building on Namayo Avenue, the Fairbairn Block, mainly for use by his business but with additional space for offices and housing in the upper levels. In 1920, Armstrong was involved in a legal case involving his office as postmaster when he was accused in the 1919 disappearance of a sum of $50,000 from the post office. Although exonerated in 1920, he would again be arrested in 1923 and charged with theft. During the trial, it was testified that a witness had seen Armstrong on the day of the robbery, with only a paper in his hand as if he were heading out. Armstrong, who had proclaimed his innocence, and provided evidence for the trial was eventually acquitted and found not guilty of the charges in a decision made on May 29, which was followed by an eruption of applause. Later in 1923, Armstrong was appointed postmaster of the Strathcona (south side) Post Office. He remained with the post office until he retired in January 1937. At the time of his retirement he was serving as postmaster of the south post office. In his years with the post office, he served a total of 14 years as postmaster. The Armstrong Drug Store would later go through multiple owners until its closing on December 10, 1993.

== Personal life ==
Armstrong married Margaret Irene McFarlane in 1893 at Greenock (Bruce County), Ontario. They had one daughter, Helen Laverne Armstrong. After Margaret died, George remarried to Jessie Mathieson at Elora, Ontario, in 1897. With her he had a son and daughter, William Sloan Seale Armstrong and Jessie Eileen Armstrong Watson. He was a member of a hospital board, the Edmonton Exhibition Board and the Masonic Order. He was affiliated with the Presbyterian Church and later the United Church of Canada, attending Robertson United Church in Edmonton, where he served as an elder. Politically, he aligned himself with the Conservative Party of Canada. In his free time he enjoyed the sports of baseball and football. He died at a hospital in Edmonton on June 9, 1947, at the age of 80, after an illness of two weeks. He was survived by his wife and children as well as a brother. He was later interred at the Edmonton Cemetery after his funeral held at Robertson United Church. His wife Jessie died in 1952 and was interred next to him. The Edmonton Historical Board states that Armstrong was remembered as " hardworking, fair and honest person who served our city well during a time of rapid change and growth".

Armstrong Industrial, an Edmonton industrial park located in the northwestern part of the city near the Yellowhead Trail, is named in his honour. His former residence, located at 10050 117 Street in Edmonton was designated as a Heritage Building by the Edmonton Historical Board.
