= 1909 Edmonton municipal election =

Municipal election in Alberta, Canada

The 1909 municipal election was held December 13, 1909 for the purpose of electing a mayor and four aldermen to sit on the Edmonton City Council, as well as three public school trustees and five separate school trustees. There were also eight proposed bylaws put to a vote of the electorate concurrently with the election.

== Positions to be elected ==
There were eight aldermen on city council, but four of the positions were already filled: Wilfrid Gariépy, John Lundy, Herman McInnes, and James McKinley had been elected to two-year terms in 1908 and were still in office.

There were six trustees on the public board of trustees, but three of the positions were already occupied: William Clark, Allan Gray, and W Ramsey had been elected to two-year terms in 1908 and were still in office.

== Mayoral candidates ==
In early November 1909, incumbent mayor Robert Lee announced that he would not seek re-election, a position he re-affirmed November 25 after being petitioned to reconsider. Subsequent to this, alderman Robert Manson confirmed that he would run. Some expected him to be challenged by alderman Wilfrid Gariépy, but the latter announced that he had no interest in running, and would support Manson provided that he endorsed some reforms to the city's commission. Manson was expected to win by acclamation until December, when Lee announced that he would run after all.

=== Platforms ===
==== Robert Lee ====
Lee promised to devote his entire time to serving as mayor, as he had done during his first term, despite his earlier statements that he was not running because he did not feel confident that he would be able to do so. He opposed the gravity water scheme on the grounds that it would result in the cost of water to Edmontonians more than doubling.

==== Robert Manson ====
Manson supported restraint in infrastructure spending - emphasizing that the city's street railway should be extended only when warranted by business, and not merely to exploit vacant property - and offered his conditional support for a gravity water system. He favoured moving the city's penitentiary to the outskirts to make better use of prime residential land, and supported selecting the city's commissioners on the basis of business acumen rather than technical expertise. He also planned to eliminate the deficits that the city's utilities ran by instituting a system of "frontage assessment".

=== Endorsements ===
Manson was endorsed by former mayor William Antrobus Griesbach, who blamed Lee for the city's recent financial difficulties and believed that Manson's plan to deal with city utilities would prevent the sale of municipal bonds being necessary.

== Voter turnout ==
There were 2200 ballots cast out of 5682 eligible voters, for a voter turnout of 38.7%.

== Results ==
(bold indicates elected, italics indicate incumbent)

=== Mayor ===
- **Robert Lee** - 1076
- Robert Manson - 1027

=== Aldermen ===
- **George S. Armstrong** - 1422
- **James Hyndman** - 1402
- **James Mould** - 801
- **John H. Millar** - 568
- Edward Withinshaw - 475
- Eli Taylor - 469
- Andrew Allan - 451
- John Yuill - 445
- William Brown - 384
- Edward Mathers - 281

=== Public school trustees ===
- **Arthur Cushing** - 1095
- **A Butchart** - 821
- **William Ferris** - 761
- J D Blayney - 449
- J St. Clair-Blackett - 429
- H D Johnson - 407
- A G Harlan - 152

=== Separate (Catholic) school trustees ===
James Collisson, Wilfrid Gariépy, Prosper-Edmond Lessard, J McAllister, and Joseph Henri Picard were elected. Detailed results are no longer available.

=== Bylaws ===
The following bylaws were voted on concurrently with the 1909 election:

==== Bylaw 224 ====
A bylaw to provide for the raising of the sum of $151,000 for the purpose of providing the estimated amount for the proportion to be borne by the Municipality for the paving of part of Jasper Avenue.

- For: 321
- Against: 708

==== Bylaw 225 ====
A bylaw to provide for the raising of the sum of $1,000 for the purpose of providing the estimated amount for the proportion to be borne by the Municipality for the paving of part of 1st Street.

- For: 321
- Against: 748

==== Bylaw 226 ====
A bylaw to provide for the raising of the sum of $1,000 for the purpose of providing the estimated amount for the proportion to be borne by the Municipality for the paving of Namayo Street.

- For: 380
- Against: 744

==== Bylaw 227 ====
A bylaw to provide for the raising of the sum of $25,900 for the purpose of providing the estimated amount for the proportion to be borne by the Municipality for the paving of part of Jasper Avenue and constructing a street railway thereon.

- For: 317
- Against: 746

==== Bylaw 228 ====
A bylaw to provide for the raising of the sum of $13,000 for the purpose of providing the estimated amount for the proportion to be borne by the Municipality for the paving of part of 1st Street and construction of a street railway thereon.

- For: 316
- Against: 761

==== Bylaw 229 ====
A bylaw to provide for the raising of the sum of $57,900 for the purpose of providing the estimated amount of the proportion to be borne by the Street Railway Department of the cost of paving Namayo Avenue.

- For: 358
- Against: 758

==== Bylaw 230 ====
A bylaw to grant Pinisch Compressing Co., a special franchise for the supply of Artificial Gas for the lighting of railway coaches.

- For: 663
- Against: 375

==== Bylaw 231 ====
A bylaw to change the place of payment of certain debentures issued under Bylaws 143 and 185 of the City of Edmonton

- For: 645
- Against: 407
