= 1918 Edmonton municipal election =

Municipal election in Alberta, Canada

The 1918 municipal election was held December 9, 1918 to elect a mayor and six aldermen to sit on Edmonton City Council, three trustees to sit on the public school board, and four trustees to sit on the separate school board.

City council held ten aldermen, but four of the positions were already filled: Matthew Esdale, James Kinney, Warren Prevey, and Orlando Bush had been elected to two-year terms in 1917 and were still in office for another year. Charles Wilson also had been elected to a two-year term in 1917, but had resigned to run for mayor. Accordingly, Charles Grant, the sixth most polar candidate in this election, was elected to finish the last year of Wilson's term.

In this election, the candidates on the labour ticket were Farmilo, Fielde, Findlay and White, with Scott running as a labour candidate for school board. Other candidates also appealed for the labour vote in 1918 included Wilson (running for mayor), Clarke, Martin, Joseph Duggan, Scott, and Mackenzie. Many labour voters supported alderman McCoppen, who in 1917 had been elected for one year with endorsement of the Labour Representation League and now was running for re-election.

The public school board held seven trustees, but four of the positions were already filled: Henry Douglas, J A McPherson, Arthur Cushing, and E T Bishop had been elected to two-year terms in 1917.

On the eight member separate board, four of the positions were filled: M Kelly, F A French, Joseph Henri Picard, and H J Roche had been elected to two-year terms in 1917. To keep the terms properly staggered with half (four) elected each year, Paul Jenvrin was elected to a one-year term.

== Voter turnout ==
There were 9046 ballots cast out of 10825 eligible voters, for a voter turnout of 83.5%.

== Results ==
- bold or ✓ indicates elected
- italics indicate incumbent
- "SS", where data is available, indicates representative for Edmonton's South Side, with a minimum South Side representation instituted after the city of Strathcona, south of the North Saskatchewan River, amalgamated into Edmonton on February 1, 1912.

=== Mayor ===
Party	Candidate	Votes	%
Labour	Joseph Clarke	4,762	52.71%
Independent	Charles Wilson	4,273	47.29%

=== Aldermen ===
Party	Candidate	Votes
Independent	Charles Hepburn	4,861
Independent	Samuel McCoppen	4,090
Independent	Henri Martin	4,029
Independent	John McKenzie	3,825
Independent	Andrew McLennan	3,599
Independent	Charles Grant	3,530
Independent	Abraham Cristall	3,324
Independent	William Martin	3,277
Labour	Alfred Farmilo	3,119
Labour	William Spencer Fielde	2,615
Labour	James Findlay	2,591
Labour	J. E. White	2,466

=== Public school trustees ===
Party	Candidate	Votes
Labour	Joseph Duggan	5,153
Independent	William Rea	4,588
Independent	Frank Crang	3,286
Labour	Frank Scott	2,217
Independent	C. Frost	2,029

=== Separate (Catholic) school trustees ===
Party	Candidate	Votes		Elected
Independent	Joseph Driscoll	563		✓
Independent	Joseph Gariépy	464		✓
Independent	Paul Jenvrin	423		✓
Independent	G. W. Curtis	302		
Independent	J. J. Murray	203	SS	✓

Under the minimum South Side representation rule, Murray was elected over Curtis.
