= 1914 Edmonton municipal election =

Municipal election in Alberta, Canada

The 1914 municipal election was held December 14, 1914 to elect a mayor and six aldermen to sit on Edmonton City Council and three trustees to sit on each of the public and separate school boards.

There were ten aldermen on city council, but four of the positions were already filled: Joseph Clarke, Rice Sheppard, J. A. Kinney, and Robert Douglas were all elected to two-year terms in 1913 and were still in office. Alexander Campbell had also been elected to a two-year term, but had resigned. Six were elected this year, with at least one having to be elected from the southside. Accordingly, the top four plus the most popular southside candidate were elected to two-year terms. The fifth-place finisher from the north side of the North Saskatchewan River - W C Mcarthur - was elected to a one-year term to replace Campbell.

There were seven trustees on the public school board, but four of the positions were already filled: Walter Ramsey, Samuel Barnes, A E May, and J S Hill had been elected to two-year terms in 1913. The same was true of the separate board, where D J Gilmurray, J O'Neill, Joseph Henri Picard, and E P O'Donnell were continuing.

Voters voted on whether to change to Elective Commission form of city government. A majority voted against the change. The question would come up again in 1920, 1921 and 1926 -- each time a majority were opposed. Voters also voted on whether to change to using wards. A majority voted to stay with city-wide districting for election of councillors. Wards would not come into use until 1971.

== Voter turnout ==
There were 10220 ballots cast out of 32246 eligible voters, for a voter turnout of 31.4%.

== Results ==
- **bold** indicates elected
- italics indicate incumbent
- South Side indicates representative for Edmonton's South Side, with a minimum South Side representation instituted after the city of Strathcona, south of the North Saskatchewan River, amalgamated into Edmonton on February 1, 1912.

=== Mayor ===
- **William Thomas Henry** - 8021
- Joseph Adair - 1964

=== Aldermen ===
- **James Ramsey** - 7286
- **Samuel Wallace Williamson** - 5,905
- **Robert Neville Frith** - 5836
- **Joseph Henri Picard** - 5814
- **William Campbell McArthur** - 5506
- **Hugh Alfred Calder** - 4871 (South Side)
- Archibald Menzies McDonald - 3,166
- Joseph Driscoll - 2,546
- Alexander Clubb - 2,049
- James East - 1,908
- Charles Gowan - 1,700
- Isidore Tremblay - 1,114
- John Hilton Treble - 844
- Tom Fraser Mayson - 470

=== Public school trustees ===
Charles Gibbs, J J McKenzie, and William Rea were elected. Detailed information is no longer available.

=== Separate (Catholic) school trustees ===
A H Esch, Joseph Gariépy, and M J O'Farrell were elected. Detailed results are no longer available.
