= Alexander Livingstone (Alberta politician) =

Canadian politician

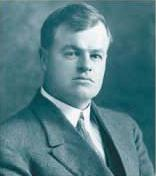

Alderman on the Edmonton City Council
- In office June 7, 1912 – December 8, 1913

Personal details
- Born: August 2, 1884 Bathgate, Scotland
- Died: October 26, 1944 (aged 60) Los Angeles, California, USA
- Profession: Draper, merchant

Alexander Livingstone (August 2, 1884 – October 26, 1944) was a Canadian politician and municipal councillor in Edmonton, Alberta.

== Early life ==
Livingstone was born in Bathgate, Scotland in 1884, and emigrated to Canada in 1904. There he established himself as a draper. He started operating out of his home, but eventually built a four-storey department store - the Caledonian Department Stores - that was one of the foremost in Edmonton.

== Political career ==
In May 1912, Herman McInnes and Charles Gowan resigned from the Edmonton City Council. In the ensuing by-election, Livingstone topped a field of six candidates and was elected to fulfill Gowan's term, which lasted until the 1913 election. Livingstone did not seek re-election at the term's conclusion.

In the 1922 election, Livingstone was one of five candidates to challenge incumbent mayor David Duggan's bid for re-election. He finished third, behind Duggan and former and future mayor Joseph Clarke. He did not re-enter politics thereafter.
