= Thomas J. Walsh (Alberta politician) =

Canadian politician (1875–1915)

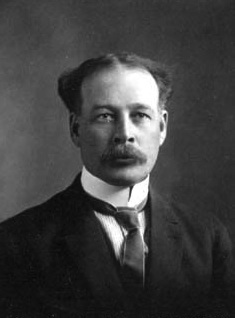

Alderman on the Edmonton City Council
- In office February 16, 1912 – December 8, 1913

Personal details
- Born: August 10, 1875 Keene, Canada West
- Died: July 11, 1915 (aged 39) Edmonton, Alberta
- Spouse: Maude Clara Bell (m. 1902)
- Profession: Teacher, hotelier, real estate developer

Thomas James Walsh (August 10, 1875 – July 11, 1915) was a politician in Alberta, Canada. He served as alderman on the Edmonton City Council from 1912 until 1913.

A native of what would later become Ontario, Walsh was an educator upon his arrival in the Edmonton/Strathcona area around 1898. Later serving as a customs officer and real estate man, Walsh would become a prominent voice in advocating for the amalgamation of Edmonton and Strathcona (then two separate cities) in the early 1910s. When the amalgamation was later passed, Walsh ran for city council and would be elected, serving out one term. He died in 1915.

== Early life and career ==
Walsh was born in 1875 at Keene, Canada West (later Ontario), a son of Timothy and Catherine (née Buck) Walsh. His father was a farmer in the Otonabee Township area. Thomas Walsh attended schooling in Norwood, Ontario, and later moved to Alberta in 1898, becoming a teacher. After arriving, he first taught at Camilla School, near Rivière Qui Barre, Sturgeon County. He returned briefly to Ontario in 1902 to wed Maude Clara Bell, a former classmate in high school. Returning to Alberta, he resumed teaching, this time at another school north of the town of Edmonton, then at Strathcona. He was also at a time the first principal of St. Anthony's, the city's separate (Roman Catholic) school. In 1907 he became a customs officer at Strathcona, serving in that capacity until 1911, when he entered the real estate profession. In the real estate field, he was known for building the Commercial Hotel, located on Whyte Avenue, in 1912, a structure that still stands presently. Walsh was a member of the Strathcona Hospital Board as well as a devout Roman Catholic, attending St. Anthony's Roman Catholic Church. He was also active in the Catholic Mutual Benefit Association, serving as an organizer and as the first president of that group at his church. Walsh was also a member of Strathcona's curling club.

== Political activities ==
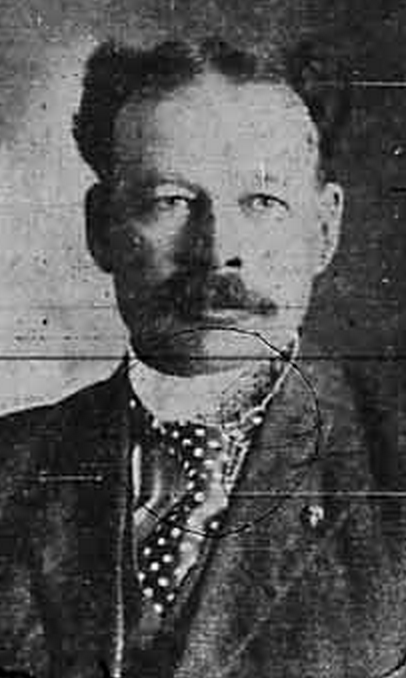
Thomas Walsh

Active in municipal affairs of Strathcona, Walsh was a leader of a group of Strathcona residents that lobbied for the amalgamation of Strathcona with the city of Edmonton, which was situated north of the North Saskatchewan River. After the amalgamation happened in February 1912, friends urged Walsh to run for alderman in the February 1912 municipal election and decided to stand. He ran campaign advertisements in the Edmonton Bulletin, noting his involvement with the amalgamation negotiations of the two cities, stating that he "was one worked strenuously and conscientsciously [sic] for it until its final consummation". He chose to run without a platform, stating "I prefer not to make any pre-election promises or to attempt now to formulate a civic policy, as undoubtedly the best civic policy will be ultimately be evolved by the mayor and council acting together on suggestions probably to come from you, the electors."

In the February 1912 municipal election, Walsh finished eighth of eighteen candidates. Ten were to be elected - fiveto serve until December 1913 and five to serve just until Dec 1912. The terms of the amalgamation between Edmonton and Strathcona, which had been effected days before the election (with Walsh's support), required that two of the five councillors elected to two-year terms had to come from the southside. Walsh was the second-most popular southside candidate so was elected to a two-year term, while fifth-place finisher James East, a northsider, received only one year. The other southside candidates elected were John G. Tipton and Hugh Calder.

During his term as alderman, Walsh opposed a proposed increase to salaries of city employees, and supported a proposal to extend the street railway system (the streetcar system). During the 1912-1913 term, Edmonton city council considered a proposed contract of the Pelican Oil and Gas Company to supply their product to the city. Walsh offered the view that it was ultimately up to the citizens to decide on the contract.

Walsh also sat briefly on the council's parks committee.

He served out his term and offered for election again in 1913, however it is unclear if he would withdraw or be defeated for re-election as names of defeated candidates are no longer available.

== Death and funeral ==
Walsh died in the morning of July 11, 1915 after suffering a stroke of paralysis one week previous, having been unconscious for a week. He was survived by his wife, Clara and their two children, Thomas and Clara, aged 12 and 10 respectively at the time. Other survivors included his father as well as eight siblings, four brothers and four sisters. After his funeral, which was held at St. Anthony's Church and attended by former mayor William Short, former mayor of Strathcona John J. Duggan, Walsh's city council colleagues whom he served with, as well as representatives from the Knights of Columbus and Catholic Mutual Benefit Association; he was buried at the St. Anthony's Church Cemetery, Mount Pleasant.
