= 1912 Edmonton municipal by-election =

Municipal election in Alberta, Canada

| ← February 1912 | June 7, 1912 | December 1912 → |

2 councillors to Edmonton City Council

On May 7, 1912 Herman McInnes resigned from Edmonton City Council. One week later, on May 14, Charles Gowan did the same. Two by-elections were held on June 7 to replace the aldermen. Both by-elections used first-past-the-post voting.

One contest was held to replace Gowan, who had been elected to a two-year term in February.

The other contest was held to replace McInnis, who had been elected to a one-year term.

In addition, eight bylaws were put to property-owners on the same day.

== Results ==
Bold indicates elected.

=== Aldermanic Race for Gowan's two-year position ===
- **Alexander Livingstone** - 700 elected
- J E Theriault - 577

=== Aldermanic Race for McInnis's one-year position ===
- **James Macfie MacDonald** - 585 elected
- D B Campbell - 259
- E H Cotterell - 208
- J J Denman - 181

=== Bylaws ===
==== Bylaw 371 ====
To provide by issue of debentures $210,240.00 for improving and further extending Municipal Power House and Plant.

- For: 877
- Against: 105

==== Bylaw 376 ====
To provide by issue of debentures $200,020.00 to pay City share of paving certain streets.

- For: 376
- Against: 45

==== Bylaw 427 ====
To provide for the raising by the issue of debentures the sum of $50,126.67 for the purchasing of a site whereon to erect car barns in connection with the municipal street railway of the City of Edmonton.

- For: 920
- Against: 107

==== Bylaw 428 ====
To raise by the issue of debentures the sum on $25,100.00 for the purchase of bridging two certain ravines of Forty-second Street or Carleton Street

- For: 701
- Against: 330

==== Bylaw 429 ====
To authorize the establishment of a gas plant for the manufacture, distribution and supply of gas and to provide by the issue of debentures of the sum of $770,880.00 for such purposes.

- For: 197
- Against: 836

==== Bylaw 430 ====
To provide by the issue of debentures the sum of $21,900.00 for the purchase of a telephone sub-station.

- For: 850
- Against: 119

==== Bylaw 431 ====
To provide for the raising by the issue of debentures the sum of $150,380.00 for acquiring certain lands to extend the Park and Driveway System of the City of Edmonton.

- For: 774
- Against: 241

==== Bylaw 435 ====
To provide by the issue of debentures the sum of $66,000.00 to purchase certain lands for warehouse and storage yards south of the Saskatchewan River.

- For: 772
- Against: 212
