= Harry Douglas (disambiguation) =

Harry Douglas (born 1984) is an American football player.

Harry Douglas(s) may also refer to:

- Harry Douglas (English footballer) (fl. 1900s), Darlington full back of the 1900s
- Harry Douglass (1902–1978), British trade unionist

== See also ==
- Harold Douglas (disambiguation)
- Henry Douglas (disambiguation)
