= Percy Abbott =

Percy Abbott may refer to:

- Percy Abbott (Australian politician) (1869–1940), Australian soldier, politician and solicitor
- Percy Abbott (Canadian politician) (1882–1942)
- Percy Abbott (magician) (1886–1960), Australian magician and magic dealer
