= Henry Douglas =

Henry Douglas may refer to:

- Henry Douglas (American football) (born 1977), American professional football player
- Henry Edward Manning Douglas (1875–1939), British soldier and recipient of the Victoria Cross
- Henry Douglas (Alberta politician) (1873–1944), politician and businessman in Alberta, Canada
- Henry Douglas (bishop) (1821–1875), Anglican bishop in India
- Henry Douglas (sport shooter) (1882–1954), British Olympic sports shooter
- Henry Douglas-Scott-Montagu, 1st Baron Montagu of Beaulieu (1832–1905), British politician
- Henry Douglas (Queensland politician) (1879–1952), Australian businessman and member of the Queensland Legislative Assembly
- Henry Douglas, Earl of Drumlanrig(1722–1754)
- Henry Kyd Douglas (1838–1903), Confederate staff officer during the American Civil War and memoirist

== See also ==
- Harry Douglas (disambiguation)
