= Thomas Bennett (Canadian politician) =

Canadian politician

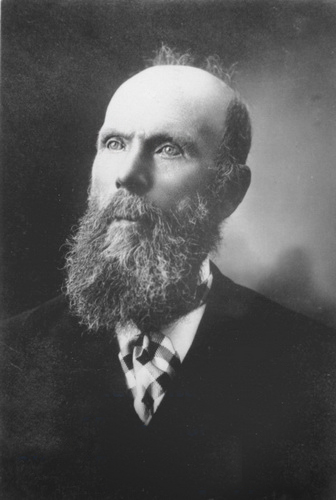

Mayor of Strathcona
- In office 1899–1900
- Succeeded by: Robert Ritchie

Personal details
- Born: November 14, 1835 Ireland, United Kingdom
- Died: January 27, 1908 (aged 72) Strathcona, Alberta
- Spouse: Wilhelmina C. Bennett
- Profession: Immigration agent

Thomas Bennett (November 14, 1835 – January 27, 1908) was an Irish-born Canadian politician. He served as the first mayor of Strathcona, Alberta.

Bennett was born in Ireland in 1835. After immigrating to Canada, he served on the city council and as mayor of Bury, Quebec. He was also a warden in Compton County, Quebec. Bennett moved to South Edmonton (renamed Strathcona in 1899) in 1895 as an immigration agent. Upon Strathcona's incorporation as a town, Bennett would be elected as the town's first mayor in an election with around 700 votes cast. His council would consist of prominent Strathcona residents, including future Premier of Alberta, Alexander Cameron Rutherford and future Strathcona mayor John J. Duggan. As mayor, Bennett took a conservative approach to affairs, in hopes of preventing debt to the town. He was an early pioneer of the education system in Strathcona, serving on the town's school board as a trustee which also included a stint as chairman. He died at his home in Strathcona in 1908 after a long illness; his body would later be taken by train to Sherbrooke, Quebec for interment after his funeral in Strathcona, which was attended by many citizens, as well as the incumbent city council and mayor. At the time of his death, he was serving as immigration agent for Strathcona once again. Built in 1912, the Bennett Centre, formerly known as Bennett School, which is located in present-day Edmonton, is named in Thomas Bennett's honour.

== Bibliography ==
- Butler, Terry (1982), 75 years of Strathcona High Schools, Strathcona Triunion Association
- Foster, John Elgin (1983), The Developing West: Essays on Canadian History in Honor of Lewis H. Thomas, Edmonton, Alberta: University of Alberta, ISBN 9780888640352
- Gilpin, John F. (1978), The City of Strathcona, 1891–1912: "We see just ahead the glory of the sun in his might", Edmonton, Alberta: University of Alberta
