= 1910 Edmonton municipal election =

Municipal election in Alberta, Canada

The 1910 municipal election was held December 12, 1910 for the purpose of electing a mayor and five aldermen to sit on the Edmonton City Council, as well as three public school trustees and five separate school trustees. There were also four proposed bylaws put to a vote of the electorate concurrently with the election.

== Positions to be elected ==
There were eight aldermen on city council, but three of the positions were already filled: James Hyndman, John H. Millar, and James Mould had been elected to two-year terms in 1909 and were still in office. George S. Armstrong had also been elected to a two-year term, but had resigned to run for mayor. Accordingly, the fifth-place finisher in the 1910 election - James McKinley - was elected to a one-year term to complete Armstrong's aldermanic term. McKinley resigned in 1911, occasioning a by-election.

There were six trustees on the public board of trustees, but three of the positions were already occupied: A Butchart, Arthur Cushing, and William Ferris had been elected to two-year terms in 1909 and were still in office.

== Voter turnout ==
There were 2149 ballots cast. Information about the number of eligible voters is no longer available.

== Results ==
(bold indicates elected, italics indicate incumbent)

=== Mayor ===
George S. Armstrong was acclaimed as mayor.

=== Aldermen ===
Each voter could cast five votes (plurality block voting) so a total of about 5600 votes were cast by the 2100 voters who voted.

- **John Lundy** - 854
- **Thomas Grindley** - 670
- **Herman McInnes** - 616
- **Charles Gowan** - 601
- **James McKinley** - 570
- Alex Stuart - 530
- J C MacDonald - 525
- A E Potter - 429
- Charles Gibbs - 369
- Gustave May - 251
- F C Humberstone - 122

=== Public school trustees ===
- **Walter Ramsey** - 813
- **William Clark** - 658
- **Samuel Barnes** - 563
- Harry Smith - 498
- E T Bishop - 355
- J St. Clair-Blackett - 263

=== Separate (Catholic) school trustees ===
John Cashman, James Collisson. Wilfrid Gariépy, Milton Martin, and Joseph Henri Picard were elected. Detailed results are no longer available.

=== Bylaws ===
The following bylaws were voted on concurrently with the 1910 election:

==== Bylaw 279 ====
A bylaw to grant Pinisch Compressing Co., a special franchise for the supply of artificial gas for the lighting of railway coaches.

- For: 1,239
- Against: 245

==== Bylaw 280 ====
A bylaw to provide for the sum of $75,000 to supplement the sum of $75,000 granted by bylaw 248 for improving East End Park and Exhibition Grounds.

- For: 1,557
- Against: 184

==== Bylaw 281 ====
A bylaw to provide for the raising of the further sum of $175,000 to be paid to the City Hospital by way of a bonus.

- For: 1,610
- Against: 196

==== Bylaw 282 ====
A bylaw to provide $2,300 for the purchase of machinery and an addition to the City Warehouse.

- For: 1,188
- Against: 459
