= John J. Duggan =

Canadian businessman, politician, and pioneer farmer

John Joseph Duggan
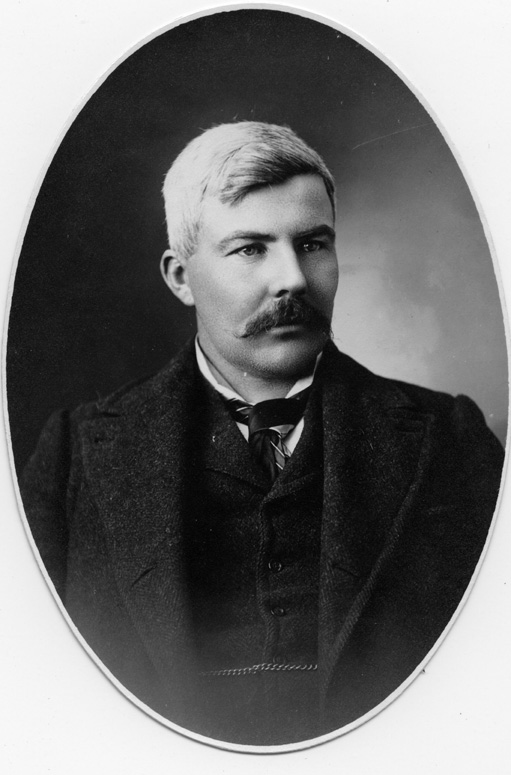
- John Joseph Duggan (1899)

Mayor of Strathcona
- In office 1901–1903
- Preceded by: Robert Ritchie (1901)
- Succeeded by: John James Mackenzie (1903)
- In office 1908–1910
- Succeeded by: Arthur Davies (1910)
- Preceded by: Nelson Darius Mills (1908)

Personal details
- Born: 16 May 1868 Fenelon Falls, Ontario
- Died: 1 December 1952 (aged 84) Edmonton, Alberta
- Spouse: Margaret Belle MacDonald (m. 1894, died 1945)
- Children: 2
- Profession: Businessman, Farmer, Real estate investor

John Joseph Duggan (16 May 1868 – 1 December 1952) was a prominent Edmonton, Canada-area businessman, farmer, and former mayor of Strathcona from 1901 to 1903, and from May 1908 to 1910.

== Early life ==
John Joseph Duggan was born to John and Jane (nee Powers) Duggan on 16 May 1868, in Fenelon Falls, Ontario. He was educated in local schools and completed high school, but did not attend university. He moved west to the Northwest Territories in 1890 with his family who settled on a farm near Camrose.

Duggan relocated from Camrose to South Edmonton (renamed Strathcona in 1899) in 1891 to work for his uncle, Cornelius J. Duggan, a British Columbia lumberman, at his lumber yard. He served as the manager for the lumber yard for three years before purchasing the business in 1894. As many local farmers were unable to pay in cash for prepared lumber, Duggan regularly traded his lumber for oats, cattle, and other farm goods which he re-sold.

Duggan expanded his business in 1898 when he opened a farming implement company and became a dealer for the International Harvesting Machine Company and the Cockshutt Plow Company. It was around this time that he opened a piggery and served as a live stock purchasing agent for the P. Burns and Company, in addition to selling large numbers of animals to the company.

In 1894, Duggan began construction on a two-story brick office building called the Duggan Block on Whyte Avenue. The building was used as the headquarters for his businesses. It was enlarged in 1907 and continued to stand on Whyte Avenue until a devastating fire destroyed the building in 1997.

Outside of his businesses, Duggan served on various boards, including the board of the South Edmonton Agricultural Society. He was also an active member of the local Catholic community and he helped found the St. Anthony's Church.

In 1894, Duggan married Belle (nee MacDonald) Duggan. Together, the couple had two children.

== Political career ==
Following the creation of the town of Strathcona on 29 May 1899, Duggan was elected to a two and a half year term on the town council with 87 votes; the most of any council candidate. During his time on the Strathcona Town Council, Duggan helped oversee various infrastructure projects, including the construction of the town's first fire hall and water tower (destroyed 1909).

=== 1902 election ===
Following his two-year term on the Strathcona town council, Duggan was elected mayor of Strathcona on 9 December 1901. As mayor, he oversaw much early development for the growing town. This included the expansion of the town's waterworks and sewage system, and the establishment of a municipally owned power plant. During his tenure, the town also passed a by-law prohibiting the construction of wooden buildings on sections of Whyte Avenue due to several costly fires. He was elected by acclamation on 8 December 1902 for a second term, but did not seek re-election in 1903.

=== 1908 re-election ===
Strathcona Fire Hall No. 1 (constructed 1909).

In 1908, Strathcona City Council was divided over the suitability of Strathcona's Police Chief Henry Patterson, to continue on as chief given allegations of personal misconduct, including drinking while on duty and charges of graft. Strathcona mayor Nelson Mills led the campaign seeking Patterson's dismissal. Mills was defeated in council on a motion to dismiss Chief Patterson and resigned as mayor on 21 April 1908 in protest. Duggan, although originally declining to run to fill the mayoral vacancy, was nominated as Mills' replacement and was elected by acclamation on 21 May 1908. He was elected twice more in December 1908 and December 1909 respectively.

As mayor, he oversaw the introduction of the legislation to establish the first public library in the region. This library, the Strathcona Library, was completed in 1913. He also oversaw the improvement of much city infrastructure, including the expansion of Strathcona Station and construction of Strathcona Fire Hall No. 1.

== Personal life ==
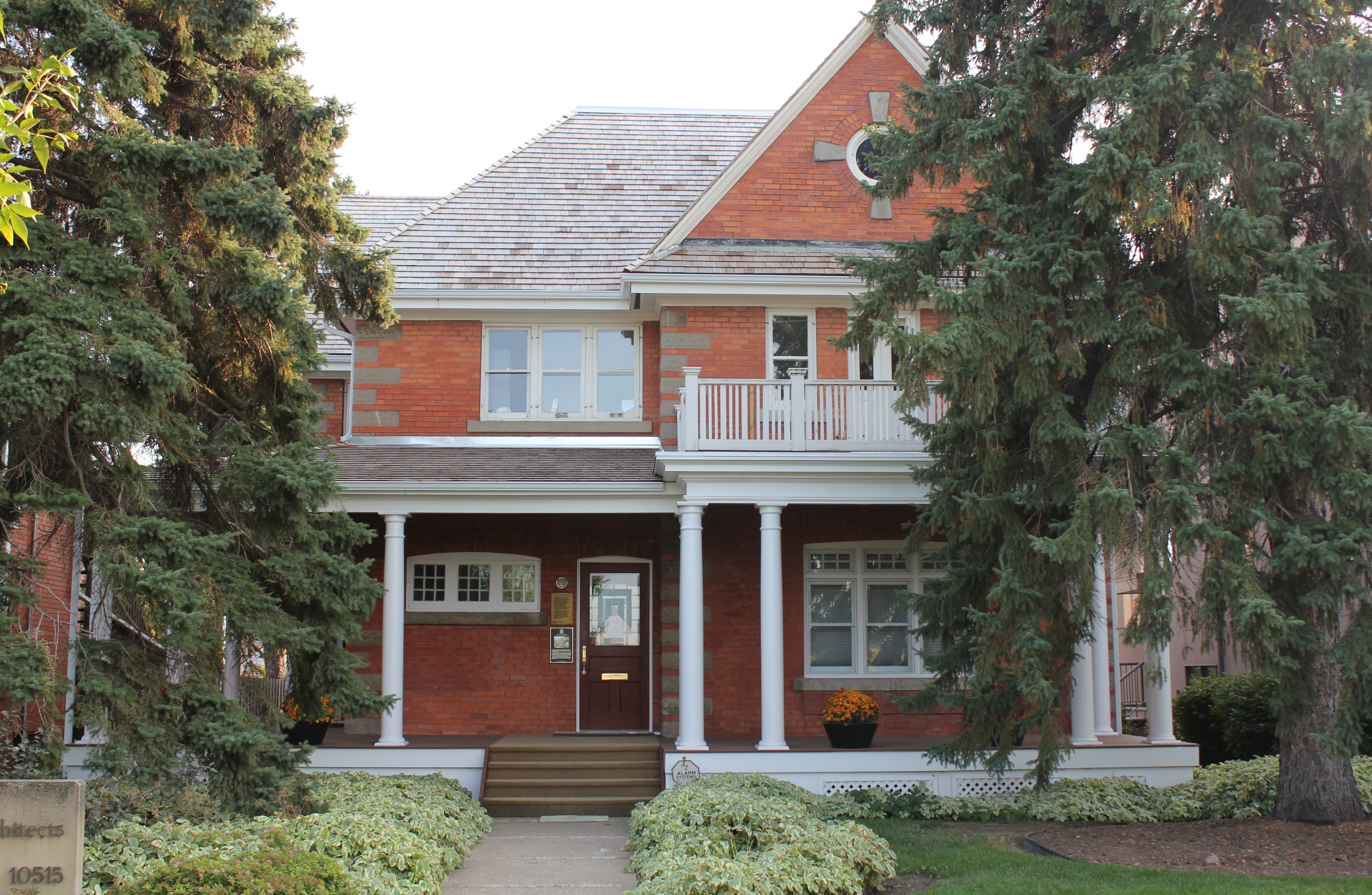
John J. Duggan House (2012).

In 1906, Duggan purchased a cattle ranch near Hay Lakes, Alberta and a large farm south of Strathcona. The land near Strathcona was formerly part of the Papaschase reserve. He sold his farming implement business, lumberyard, and Duggan Block in 1908 to concentrate on his farming ventures. He used the connections he made from his previous ventures to find success in farming, and quickly grew his land holdings to include over 320 acres near Edmonton and a further 1000 acres near Hay Lakes, in addition to several properties in Edmonton. This included several additional parcels of land south of Edmonton which are now part of the Duggan neighbourhood in Edmonton.

In 1907, Duggan built a two-story brick residence in Strathcona on Saskatchewan Drive. The street was home to many prominent Strathcona residents, including Colonel Frederick Jamieson, Edmonton mayor James McCrie Douglas, and Alberta premier Alexander Cameron Rutherford. Duggan's home, known locally as Duggan House, was lived in by the family for 25 years before being sold to the city of Edmonton. The city planned to demolish the home to make room for road construction, but the project was cancelled before demolition took place. In 1981, the Alberta Association of Architects purchased the home and undertook restoration of the property. It was named a Provincial Historic Resource by the Government of Alberta in 1982 and a Municipal Historic Resource by the City of Edmonton in 2013.

Duggan also remained involved in the community. In 1932, he served as president of the Northern Alberta Pioneers' and Old Timers' Association. He also served on the organization's board for several years and continued to involve himself in charity work associated with St. Anthony's Church.

== Death ==
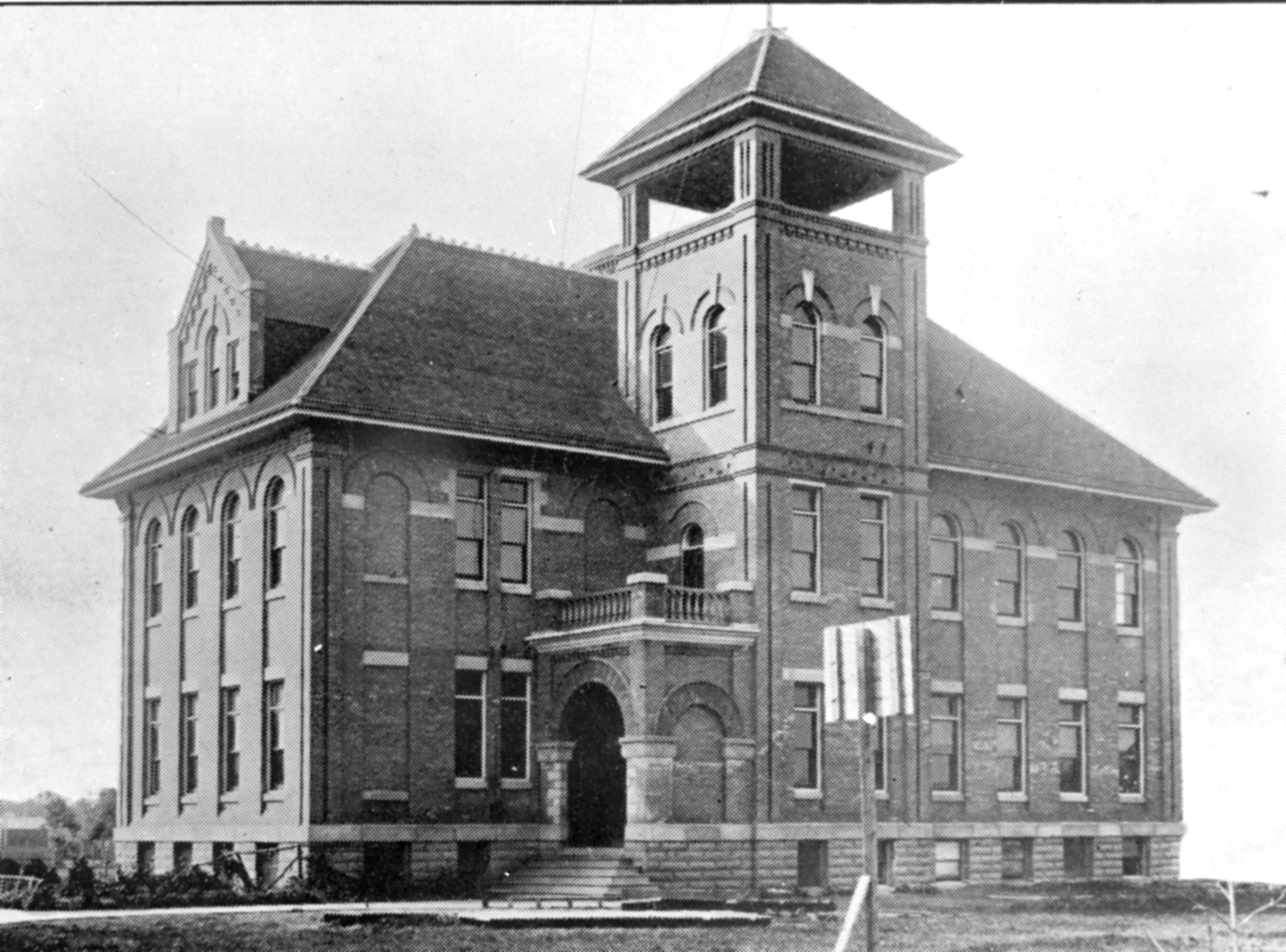
Duggan Street School (now Queen Alexandra School), 1908.

On 1 December 1952, following a brief illness, Duggan died in hospital in Edmonton. He is buried in the Mount Pleasant Cemetery.

== Honours ==
In 1906, the town of Strathcona named the Duggan Street School in Duggan's honour. The school was renamed the Queen Alexandra School in 1910.

The neighbourhood of Duggan in Edmonton is named in Duggan's honour. Although initially south of Edmonton's borders, it was annexed in the 1960's as the city expanded. The Duggan Community league, formed in 1971, also bears his name, as does the Duggan Bridge on Saskatchewan Drive in Edmonton.
