= James Hyndman =

James Hyndman may refer to:

- James Hyndman (politician) (1874–1971), Canadian politician, lawyer, and judge
- James Hyndman (actor) (born 1962), Canadian actor
