= John Tipton (disambiguation) =

John Tipton may refer to:

- John Tipton (Tennessee frontiersman) (1730–1813), American frontiersman and prominent figure in Tennessee's pre-statehood period
- John Tipton (1786-1839), United States Senator from Indiana
- John Tipton (Alberta politician) (1849-1914), politician and coal miner in Alberta, Canada
- John Beresford Tipton, a fictional character in the American TV series The Millionaire
