= 1908 Edmonton municipal election =

Municipal election in Alberta, Canada

The 1908 municipal election was held December 14, 1908 for the purpose of electing a mayor and six aldermen to sit on the Edmonton City Council, as well as three public school trustees and five separate school trustees. There were also five proposed bylaws put to a vote of the electorate concurrently with the election.

== Positions to be elected ==
There were eight aldermen on city council, normally four elected each year. Daniel Fraser, who had been elected to a one-year term in a December 1907 by-election, and other aldermen elected to two year terms in 1906 were all leaving. Two of the other seats were already filled: George S. Armstrong and Robert Manson had been elected to two-year terms in 1907 and were still in office.

Robert Lee and Thomas Bellamy had also been elected to two-year terms in 1907 but were resigning to run for mayor.

Accordingly, the top four finishers in the 1908 aldermanic race were elected to two year terms; the fifth and sixth-place finishers - Andrew Agar and Daniel Fraser - were elected to one-year terms.

There were five trustees on the public board of trustees, but two of the positions were already occupied: A E May and Alex Taylor had been elected to two-year terms in 1907 and were still in office.

== Campaign ==
The campaign's major issue was how to best increase the city's water supply. Mayoral candidate Robert Lee supported enhancing the capacity of the existing plant, while his opponent, Thomas Bellamy, favoured constructing a new plant. According to the Edmonton Bulletin, Lee's earlier entry into the race and early success at recruiting prominent citizens as his public supporters was a decisive factor in his defeat of Bellamy, who entered the race later.

== Voter turnout ==
There were 1942 ballots cast in the 1908 municipal election. The number of eligible voters is no longer available.

== Results ==
(bold indicates elected, italics indicate incumbent)

=== Mayor ===
- **Robert Lee** - 1303
- Thomas Bellamy - 639

=== Aldermen ===
- **Wilfrid Gariépy** - 1,424
- **John Lundy** - 1020
- **Herman McInnes** - 1,010
- **James McKinley** - 902
- **Andrew Agar** - 891
- **Daniel Fraser** - 812
- Cameron Anderson - 742
- A E Potter - 560
- Alex McSporan - 462
- James Francis - 353
- Frank Ball - 296
- John Galbraith - 274
- Thomas Killips - 115

=== Public School Trustees ===
- **Walter Ramsey** - 818
- **Allan Gray** - 780
- **William Clark** - 761
- William Ferris - 533
- J G M Sloan - 489
- Gregory Krikewsky - 273
- William Eastwood - 229

=== Separate (Catholic) School Trustees ===
James Collisson, Wilfrid Gariépy, Prosper-Edmond Lessard, J McAllister, and Joseph Henri Picard were elected. Detailed results are no longer available.

=== Bylaws ===
The following bylaws were voted on concurrently with the 1908 election:

==== Bylaw 161 ====
A bylaw to raise $42,500 to pay for part of a traffic deck on the C.P.R. Bridge.

- For: 1,072
- Against: 47

==== Bylaw 164 ====
A bylaw to raise $30,000 to supplement $49,000 to pay for street railway material.

- For: 921
- Against: 110

==== Bylaw 165 ====
A bylaw to raise $40,000 for improvement in and extensions to the Municipal Telephone System.

- For: 1,022
- Against: 34

==== Bylaw 166 ====
A bylaw to raise the sum of $60,000 for improvement in and extensions to Municipal Electric Plant.

- For: 1,019
- Against: 33

==== Bylaw 167 ====
A bylaw to raise $5,000 to supplement previous amounts for an Isolation Hospital.

- For: 841
- Against: 89
