= Robert Lee (Canadian politician) =

Canadian politician

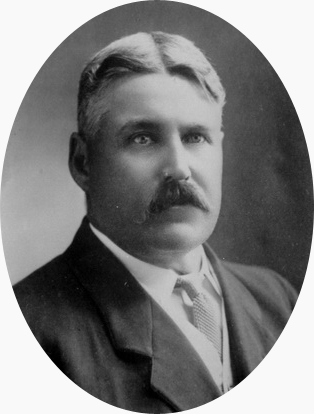

10th Mayor of Edmonton
- In office December 14, 1908 – December 12, 1910
- Preceded by: John Alexander McDougall
- Succeeded by: George S. Armstrong

Alderman on the Edmonton Town Council
- In office December 11, 1899 – December 9, 1901

Alderman on the Edmonton City Council
- In office December 9, 1907 – December 14, 1908

Personal details
- Born: March 10, 1862 Lanark County, Canada West
- Died: August 5, 1925 (aged 63) Edmonton, Alberta
- Spouse(s): Annette Wilson (1 daughter, 2 sons)
- Profession: Businessman

Robert Lee (March 10, 1862 – August 5, 1925) was a politician in Alberta, Canada and a mayor of Edmonton.

== Biography ==
Lee was born in Lanark County, Canada West (Ontario), on March 10, 1862. He graduated from the Dominion Business College in Kingston. He married Annette Wilson, with whom he had a daughter and two sons, in 1897. He served as a member of the Lanark City Council from 1892 until 1898, after which he moved to Edmonton. He was in partnership with John Ross in grain trading, insurance, and loans under the name Ross & Lee until 1902, after which he partnered with W I Crafts in real estate, timber, and coal mining under the name Crafts & Lee (another partner was admitted in 1905 as they became Crafts, Lee & Gallinger). He served on the public school board from 1902 until 1904.

He first sought municipal office in 1907, when he was elected to a two-year term as alderman on Edmonton City Council, finishing fourth of twelve candidates in an election in which the top five candidates were elected. He resigned midway through his term to run for mayor in the 1908 election, when he defeated Thomas Bellamy by 1303 votes to 639. He was re-elected in 1909, defeating Robert Manson, but did not seek re-election in 1910 and stayed out of municipal politics thereafter.

In 1905 he erected the Lee Block on the corner of Jasper Avenue and Second Street (102 Street). The building housed, among other businesses, Reed's Bazaar. It was destroyed by fire in 1913 but a reconstruction of the building now stands at Fort Edmonton Park. He was active with the Presbyterian Church and the Liberal Party of Alberta.

Robert Lee died August 5, 1925.

Preceded by John Alexander McDougall	Mayor of Edmonton; 1908–1910	Succeeded by George S. Armstrong
