= Gustave May =

Canadian photographer and politician (1881–1943)

Gustave Henry May
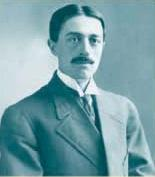

Alderman on the Edmonton City Council
- In office February 16, 1912 – December 14, 1914

Personal details
- Born: June 2, 1881 New York City, New York
- Died: May 31, 1943 (aged 61) Paramus, New Jersey
- Spouse: Florence Mabel Byron (d. before 1959)
- Relations: Percy Claude Byron (brother in-law); Joseph Byron (father in-law)
- Children: Gilbert B. (1906–2001); Joseph Henry (1908–1983); Gustave E. (1909–?); George A. (1914–1990)
- Profession: Photo engraver

Gustave Henry May (June 2, 1881 – May 31, 1943) was a photographer and politician in Alberta, Canada. He co-operated the first photo-engraving business in western Canada and served on the Edmonton City Council from 1912 until 1914.

== Biography ==
Gustave May was born in New York City in 1881 to Gustave Charles May (1845–1896) and Estelle Lebrethon, both of French ancestry. He came to Edmonton in 1904, where he became a partner with his brother-in-law Percy Byron in the Byron-May company, the first photo-engraving business in the Canadian west. In the 1910 municipal election he ran for alderman on the Edmonton City Council, but finished tenth of eleven candidates. He was elected to a one-year term in the next election on a single-plank platform of increasing the availability of water within the city, and was re-elected to a two-year term in 1912. Having suffered a nervous breakdown earlier in the year, he did not seek re-election at the conclusion of this term in 1914.

At the time of the 1911 Census of Canada, he was living in Edmonton with his wife, Florence, and their sons, Gilbert, Joseph and Gustave. His occupation was listed as photographer. At the time of the 1916 Canada Census of Manitoba, Saskatchewan, and Alberta, May was living in Edmonton with his wife, Florence, and their sons, Gilbert (age 10), Joseph (age 8), Gustave (age 6), and George (age 1). The census recorded him being in the photo business.

May moved back to the United States in 1918. In a draft registration card completed at the time of World War I, May indicated that he was living on Park Avenue in Fairview, Bergen County, New Jersey, and working as a salesman for the Triumph Lamp Co., and a special reporter for a newspaper called the Dispatch. At the time of the 1920 United States census, he was living on Third Street in Fairview Borough in Bergen County, New Jersey, and working as a newspaper reporter. He was living with his wife, Florence, and their children, Gilbert (age 13), Joseph (age 11), Gustave (age 10), and George (age 5). At the time of the 1930 United States census, he was working as a newspaper journalist and living in Ridgefield Park, New Jersey, with his wife, Florence, and their sons, Gilbert, Gustave and George. At the start of World War II in 1942, May was living with his son, Joseph May, at 184 Teaneck Road in Ridgefield Park, New Jersey. He indicated at the time that he was "unemployed due to illness."

Gustave Henry May died on May 31, 1943, at the Bergen County Hospital in Paramus, New Jersey, of an epithelioma. He was buried at Maple Grove Park Cemetery in Hackensack.
