= Hugh Calder =

Real estate developer and politician (1872–1964)

Hugh Alfred Calder
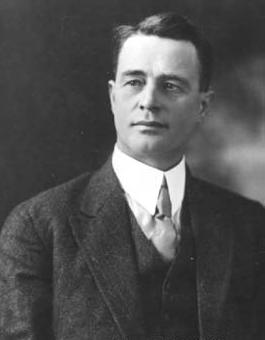

Alderman on the Edmonton City Council
- In office February 16, 1912 – December 11, 1916

Personal details
- Born: December 25, 1872 Bridgewater, Nova Scotia
- Died: August 6, 1964 (aged 91) Vancouver, British Columbia
- Profession: Businessman

Hugh Alfred Calder (December 25, 1872 – August 6, 1964) was a real estate developer and politician in Alberta, Canada. He served as an alderman on Edmonton City Council between 1912 and 1916 and was a principal founder of the Village of West Edmonton.

== Early life ==
Calder was born in Bridgewater, Nova Scotia in 1873, and grew up there before moving to Labrador, where he started its first lumber company. In 1902, he moved to Edmonton, where he spent five years scouting suitable timber for ties for the Grand Trunk Railway. In 1907 he co-founded Foster and Calder, one of the city's first real estate firms, which developed the Village of West Edmonton, much of what is now the Calder neighbourhood in Edmonton. He also, as a member of the United Church of Canada, helped construct the first building to house the Knox United Church.

== Politics ==
Calder's first bid for political office took place during the February 1912 municipal election, when he ran to fill one of ten aldermanic seats available on Edmonton City Council. He finished eleventh of eighteen, but the terms of the just-effected merger between Edmonton and Strathcona stipulated that at least three of the aldermen come from the south side of the North Saskatchewan River. Only two of the top ten (John Tipton and Thomas J. Walsh) were, so Calder was elected to the third spot instead of the tenth place D. B. Campbell. Because of the amalgamation, an entire new council was being elected (Edmonton's councils were normally elected five members at a time for two-year terms) and the five councillors with the fewest votes were only elected to one-year terms, meaning that Calder had to seek re-election in December of that year. He finished eighth of seventeen candidates; only five councillors were to be elected, but Calder benefited again from the provision requiring south side representation; since none of the candidates to finish ahead of him were from the south side, Calder was re-elected.

He was up for re-election again in the 1914 election, in which there were six, rather than five, seat available due to the resignation of Alexander Campbell. Calder finished sixth, good enough to win Campbell's seat and serve the remaining year in his term; however, Calder was instead elected to a two-year term as the top finishing south side candidate. He did not seek re-election at the conclusion of this term.

== Post-political career ==
In 1916, he went to Scotland as a Major in the 19th Alberta Dragoons, where he commanded a Canadian Forestry Battalion. Upon his return, he retired to his farm in south Edmonton. He died in Vancouver August 6, 1964, survived by three daughters and one son.

Hugh Calder was involved in Edmonton Exhibition Board and the Masonic Lodge.
