= William J. McNamara =

Canadian politician

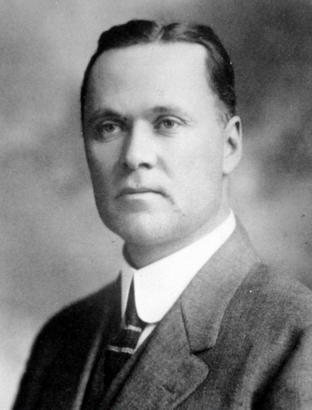

12th Mayor of Edmonton
- In office December 8, 1913 – October 27, 1914
- Preceded by: William Short
- Succeeded by: William Thomas Henry

Personal details
- Born: December 27, 1879 Renfrew, Ontario, Canada
- Died: January 1, 1947 (aged 67) Phoenix, Arizona, US
- Spouse: Anna G. McNamara
- Profession: Teacher, real estate agent

William James McNamara (December 27, 1879 – January 1, 1947) was a politician in Alberta, Canada, a mayor of both Edmonton and Wetaskiwin, Alberta, and the first mayor of Edmonton to be forced from office over a scandal.

== Biography ==
McNamara was born in Renfrew, Ontario on December 27, 1879. He was educated at Saint Laurent College in Montreal and came to Edmonton in 1886. In 1900 he was hired as the first teacher at Lone Spruce School, an Edmonton boys' school. In 1905 he formed a real estate partnership with Lorne York that acquired real estate in Camrose, Wetaskiwin, and Edmonton.

He was elected mayor of Wetaskiwin in 1909. After returning to Edmonton, he ran for mayor in the 1913 election, in which he defeated incumbent William Short, receiving 50.2% of the vote in the two person race. In doing so, he became both the first person in Edmonton's history to defeat a sitting mayor and the winner of the closest mayor election in the city's history, a record that still stands.

In office, he formed an alliance with future mayor Joseph Clarke (then an alderman) against those who wanted to drive prostitution and gambling out of the city. McNamara fired both the police chief and the head of the morality squad. His alliance with Clarke ended when the two came to blows in a meeting of Edmonton City Council.

Later in his term, he was convicted by Justice William Ives of voting on a matter in which he had a pecuniary interest and was, along with alderman James East, expelled from office on October 27, 1914. He stayed out of politics thereafter. He moved to Detroit, Michigan on November 19, 1915.

McNamara died on January 1, 1947, at 3:55 pm in Phoenix, Arizona, of heart failure.

Preceded by William Short	Mayor of Edmonton; 1913–1914	Succeeded by William Thomas Henry (after being left vacant for two months)
