= Andrew Agar =

Canadian politician (1865–1948)

Andrew B. Agar
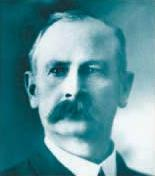

Alderman on the Edmonton City Council
- In office December 14, 1908 – December 13, 1909

Personal details
- Born: January 9, 1865 St. Vincent, Canada West
- Died: August 13, 1948 (aged 83) Edmonton, Alberta, Canada
- Spouse: Clara Louisa Zinken

Andrew B. Agar (January 9, 1865 – August 13, 1948) was a politician in Alberta, Canada and a municipal councillor in Edmonton.

Agar was born in Canada West in 1865. He came to Edmonton and established a hardware business in 1907 with his brother, James, which he ran from then until 1911. He was elected to the Edmonton City Council to a one-year term in the 1908 municipal election, and did not seek re-election at the conclusion of his term. He became the city commissioner for the City of Edmonton in 1911. In 1917, he moved to a farm 6 miles southwest of Edmonton, where he lived up until his retirement in 1938. Prior to his retirement, Agar lived in a summer home in Seba Beach, Alberta, and in the winters with his daughter, Frances in Edmonton.

Agar had 3 sons and 1 daughter. One son, Egan, was killed in World War I while serving in the 202 Sportsmen's Battalion and Royal Flying Corps in 1917. Another son, Edward Lloyd died in 1936. His daughter, Frances of Edmonton, and son Carlyle "Carl" of Penticton, British Columbia, survived him at the time of his death in 1948.

Agar died on Friday, August 13, 1948, at the Royal Alexandria Hospital after an illness that had him hospitalized for about 2 weeks before his death. He had trouble hearing for several years. He was interred in the Edmonton Cemetery. Agar and his wife, Clara had celebrated their 50th wedding anniversary 7 years earlier. His wife, Clara died in January 1955.
