= Percy Claude Byron =

English photographer (1878–1959)

Percy Claude Byron (Clayton)
- Born: September 21, 1878; Nottingham, England
- Died: June 9, 1959 (aged 80); Cranford, New Jersey
- Employer: Byron Company
- Children: Joseph M. Byron; Grace Byron Murtaugh; Elizabeth Byron Luce
- Parent: Joseph Byron
- Relatives: Gustave May (brother in-law)

Perciful Claude Byron (September 21, 1878 – June 9, 1959) was an English photographer at the Byron Company in Manhattan. Percy was "the premier maritime photographer of his generation".

== Biography ==
His father, Joseph Byron, was born in England in 1847 and opened the Byron Company in Manhattan in 1892. Perciful Claude Byron was born on September 21, 1878, in England. In 1935 he was the official photographer for the maiden voyage of the SS Normandie. Percy was born in 1878 in Nottingham, England. He founded the first photoengraving plant in Edmonton, Alberta, Canada (1906–16). He returned to his father's studio in 1917, Since 1917 he specialized in maritime photography while he lived on Staten Island. In 1942 he closed the family studio because of World War II. He then went to work for the Essex Art Engraving Company of Newark, New Jersey, until he retired in December 1958 because of his ill health. He died in 1959 in Cranford, New Jersey.

== Publication ==
- Byron, Percy Claude (1958). Once Upon a City: New York from 1890 to 1910. Macmillan Publishers.

== Archive ==
- 22,000 photos at the Museum of the City of New York between 1890 and 1942. The collection was donated by Percy Claude Byron in 1942.
