= Byron Company =

- Industry: Photography; Commercial photography
- Founded: 1892
- Founder: Joseph Byron
- Defunct: 1942
- Fate: Closed during World War II
- Successor: Byron Photography
- Headquarters: Manhattan, New York City, United States
- Key people: Joseph Byron; Percy Claude Byron
- Services: Stage/theatrical photography; Maritime/ship photography; City life documentation
- Website: www.byronphoto.com

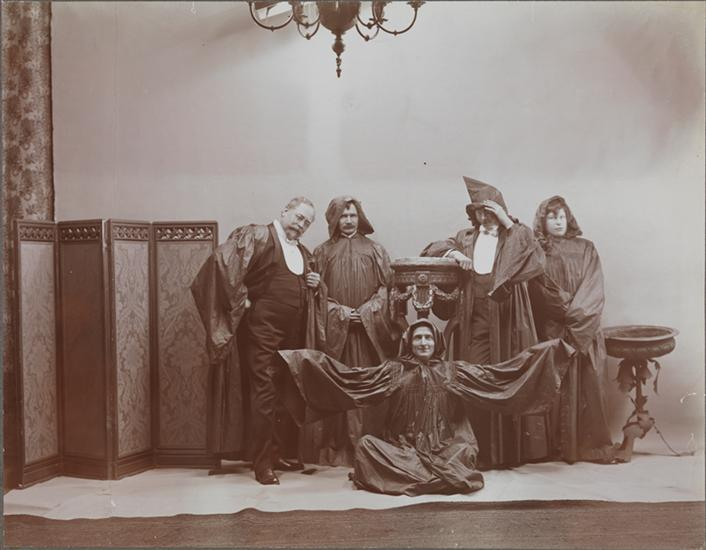
Byron photographic staff 1905

The Byron Company is a New York City photography studio in Manhattan that was founded in 1892. It is "one of New York's pre-eminent commercial photography studios" that "documented the essence of New York City life". Percy Byron, the son of the founder, was "the premier maritime photography of his generation".

== History ==
Joseph Byron was born in London in 1847 to a commercial photographer, and he opened the Byron Company in Manhattan in 1892. He took on as his partner his son, Percy Claude Byron. Since 1917 Percy specialized in maritime photography and lived on Staten Island. Byron died in 1923, and Percy died in 1959. In 1942 Percy closed the family studio because of World War II. He then went to work for the Essex Art Engraving Company of Newark, New Jersey until he retired in December 1958 because of his ill health.

== Legacy ==
The descendants operate as Byron Photography with 7th generation photographer, Thomas Byron and his son, 8th generation photographer, Mark Byron.

== Archive ==
- 24,175 photos at the Museum of the City of New York taken between 1890 and 1942.
