= Duggan House =

Historic house in Edmonton, Alberta, built 1907

Coordinates: 53°31′23″N 113°30′05″W

J. J. Duggan Residence
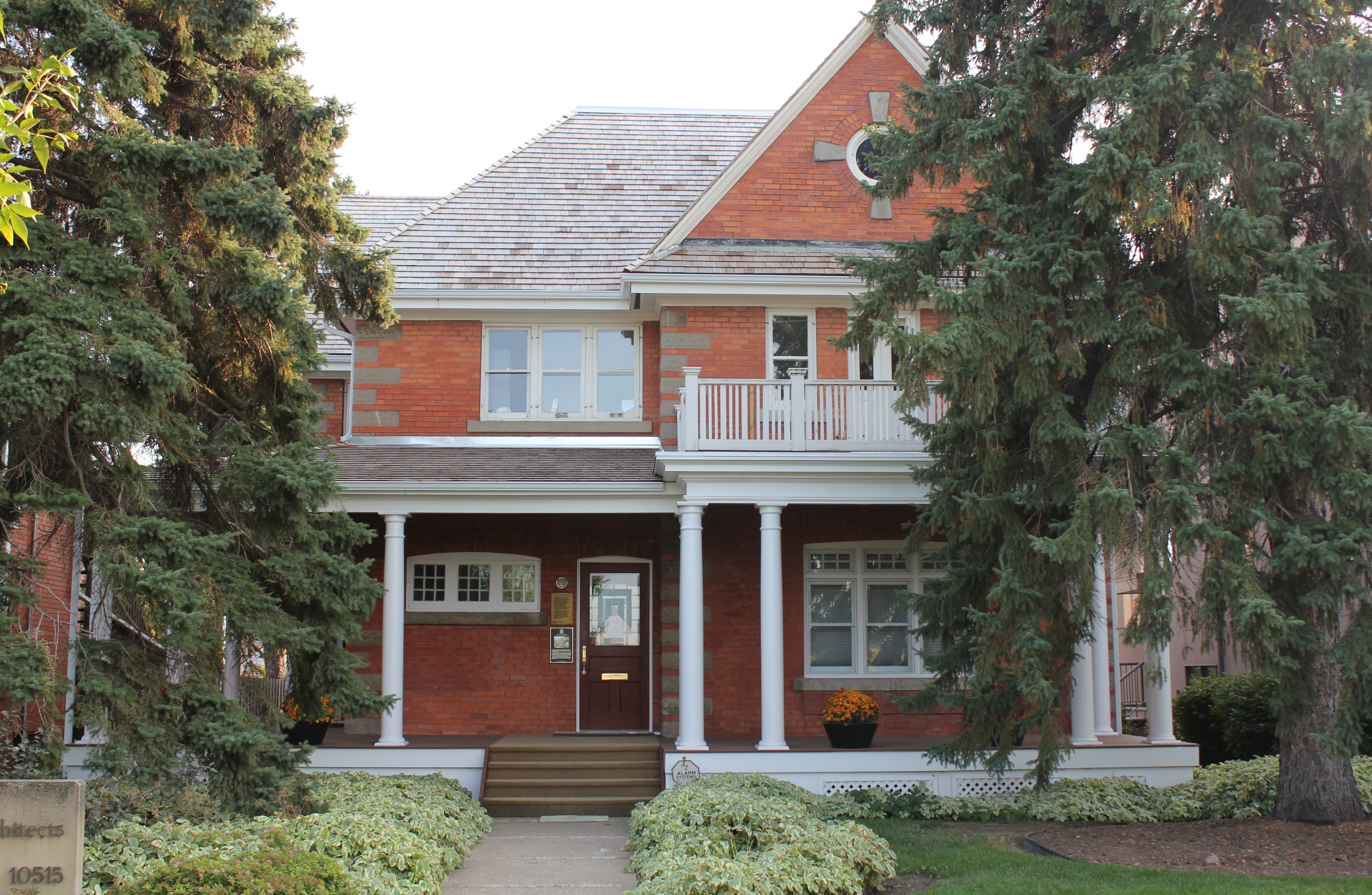
- J. J. Duggan House (2012)
- Interactive map of the J. J. Duggan Residence area
- Alternative names: Duggan House John. J. Duggan Residence

General information
- Architectural style: Queen Anne
- Location: 10515 Saskatchewan Drive, Edmonton, Alberta, T6E, Canada, Edmonton, Canada
- Year built: 1907
- Cost: $8000 (1907)

The Duggan House, officially the J. J. Duggan Residence, is a brick building in Edmonton, Alberta, Canada, that is a both a Provincial Historic Resource and a Municipal Historic Resource. It was listed on the Canadian Register of Historic Places in 2008. Located in Edmonton's Old Strathcona district, it was built in 1907 for John Joseph Duggan, two-time mayor of the then city of Strathcona, and a longtime Edmonton businessman. Duggan lived there with his family for 25 years, and then the house was sold to the city and slated for demolition.

Since the early 1980s it has been home to the Alberta Association of Architects, who purchased and restored it as part of an Alberta 75th anniversary initiative. It was further restored by David Murray Architects in 2013.
