= Harold Douglas =

Harold Douglas may refer to:

- Hal Douglas, American voice actor
- Harold Douglas of Proston, Queensland
- J. Harold Douglas of Dublin Chamber of Commerce

== See also ==
- Harry Douglas (disambiguation)
