= Harry Douglas (English footballer) =

English footballer

Personal information
- Full name: Harry Douglas
- Place of birth: Hartlepool, England
- Position: Outside right

Senior career*
Years	Team	Apps	(Gls)
1???–1903	South Bank		
1903–190?	Middlesbrough	4	(0)
1904–1905	Darlington		
–	Bishop Auckland		
- * Club domestic league appearances and goals

Harry Douglas (active 1900s) was an English football outside right who played in the Football League for Middlesbrough and in non-league football for South Bank, Darlington and Bishop Auckland.

== Life and career ==
Douglas was born in Hartlepool. He played football for Northern League club South Bank, and was included in the North Riding FA team for an inter-association match against West Yorkshire in September 1902, before signing for Football League First Division club Middlesbrough in January 1903. The move was controversial: the South Bank club took the matter to the Northern League committee, claiming that proper procedures had not been followed, but the meeting ruled that "there was no question of poaching" and that Douglas had requested a transfer. Meanwhile, he made his Football League debut on 17 January, standing in at outside right for the injured Robert Watson for the visit to West Bromwich Albion; Middlesbrough lost 1–0. Douglas played in three of the next four matches, but those were his last. He had remained an amateur while playing for Middlesbrough, and resumed his Northern League career with Darlington – for whom he scored twice in the 1904–05 FA Cup – and then Bishop Auckland.
