= Percy Abbott (Canadian politician) =

Canadian politician (1882–1942)

Percy W. Abbott
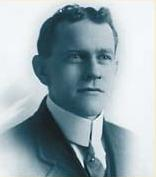

Alderman on the Edmonton City Council
- In office December 8, 1919 – December 12, 1921

Personal details
- Born: April 29, 1882 Lucan, Ontario
- Died: November 7, 1942 (aged 60)
- Party: Citizens Committee
- Spouse: Margaret McIntyre
- Children: Three daughters
- Profession: Teacher, lawyer

Percy W. Abbott (April 29, 1882 – November 7, 1942) was an alderman in Edmonton, Alberta, Canada.

== Biography ==
Abbott was born in Lucan, Ontario, where he attended school. He later moved to Regina, Saskatchewan and attended the Regina Normal School. He moved to Stony Plain, Alberta, where he taught school for two years, before being admitted to the Law Society of Alberta in 1909. In 1908 he married Margaret McIntyre of Edmonton. The couple had three daughters.

He opened a law office in Edmonton, and later established the partnerships Abbott and McLaughlin (1917-1933) and Abbott and Auxier (1933-1942). In 1919 he was elected alderman on Edmonton City Council, finishing fourth out of twelve candidates (the top five were elected). He served a two-year term, but did not seek reelection in 1921.

Percy W. Abbott died in 1942 at the age of 60. He had been a member of the Independent Order of Foresters, the YMCA, the Edmonton Club, and the Masonic Order.
