= Robert Manson =

Canadian politician

Robert John Manson
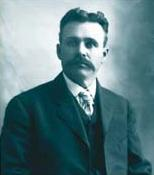

Alderman on the Edmonton City Council
- In office December 11, 1905 – December 13, 1909

Personal details
- Died: May 10, 1932 (aged 65) Woodbend, Alberta
- Spouse: M. Rogers
- Children: One daughter
- Profession: Contractor

Robert John Manson (1866 or 1867 – May 10, 1932) was a politician in Alberta, Canada and a municipal councillor in Edmonton, 1906–1909.

== Biography ==
Manson came to Edmonton from Renfrew County, Ontario in 1891. He fast became one of the city's leading contractors, and was responsible for the creation of buildings including the Alberta Hotel and the MacKay Avenue school. He was also a director of the Edmonton Brick Co. and the Sand-lime Brick Co.

He first sought political office during the 1905 municipal election, when he ran for and was elected alderman on Edmonton City Council, finishing second of eleven candidates. He won re-election in the 1907 election, finishing first of twelve candidates.

Rather than seek a third term, he challenged incumbent mayor Robert Lee in the 1909 election and finished only forty-nine votes back.

He sought the UFA nomination in the West Edmonton riding in preparation for the 1921 federal election. Sitting MLA D.M. Kennedy won the nomination and the seat.

After this defeat, he did not seek public office again.

In 1920, Manson left Edmonton to farm in Woodbend, Alberta, where he married M. Rogers, with whom he had a daughter. On May 10, 1932, Manson and two hired hands set out on a raft down the North Saskatchewan River in search of some missing cattle. The wind blew the raft into a deep part of the river, where Manson, a non-swimmer, fell out and drowned. His body was recovered thirteen days later.
