= William Harold Clark =

Canadian politician

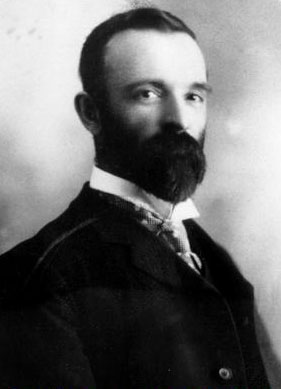

Alderman on the Edmonton City Council
- In office December 12, 1904 – December 11, 1905

Personal details
- Born: July 1, 1869 London, England
- Died: December 24, 1913 (aged 44) Edmonton, Alberta, Canada
- Spouse: Agnes Jane Robson
- Children: Three sons, one daughter
- Profession: Builder, woodworker
- Awards: Edward Longstreth Medal (1894)

William Harold Clark (July 1, 1869 – December 24, 1913) was an English-born Canadian businessman and politician. He was a municipal councillor in Edmonton, Alberta.

== Biography ==
William Clark was born in London, England on July 1, 1869. After being educated in London's public schools, he went to work for his father at age sixteen in the building and contracting business.

He moved to Toronto, Ontario, Canada in 1889 and on to Edmonton in 1895. In Edmonton, he founded W. H. Clark & Company, which produced sash, doors, and interior furnishings. In this capacity, he did the millwork for many significant buildings, including the Civic Block, the medical building at the University of Alberta, and several hospital units.

In 1898, he married Agnes Jane Robson, with whom he had three sons and a daughter.

In the 1904 municipal election, Clark ran for Edmonton City Council as an alderman. He finished fifth of seventeen, and was one of four candidates elected to one year terms (the top four candidates were elected to two year terms, the next four to one year terms). He sought re-election in the 1905 election, but finished fifth of ten candidates; only four were elected.

Clark established the Edmonton Lumber Company in 1905, which logged on the North Saskatchewan River. He was also President of the Edmonton Brick Company.

In the 1908 municipal election he ran for the public school board, and was one of three candidates elected (he placed third of seven candidates). He was re-elected in 1910 to what was nominally a two-year term, but all municipal officials had their terms truncated by the merger of Edmonton with Strathcona. Accordingly, Clark sought re-election in the February 1912 election, and was elected to a one-year term. He did not seek re-election at its conclusion.

Clark was a director of the YMCA, and a member of the Independent Order of Odd Fellows, the Sons of England, the Edmonton Club, and the Masonic Lodge. He died December 24, 1913, from tuberculosis.
