= Harry Smith (Alberta politician) =

Henry Richard Smith
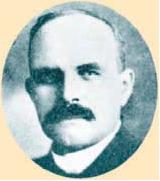

Alderman on the Edmonton City Council
- In office December 9, 1912 – December 14, 1914

Personal details
- Born: September 11, 1873 New Hamburg, Ontario
- Died: October 24, 1928 (aged 55)
- Spouse(s): Martha Doyle (died 1903), Mabel Rife
- Children: Martha (with Doyle), Howard, Constance, and Margaret (with Rife)
- Education: Trinity University
- Profession: Physician

Henry Richard Smith (September 11, 1873 – October 24, 1928) was a politician and physician in Alberta, Canada. He served on Edmonton City Council from 1912 until 1914 and as president of the Edmonton Conservative Association and the Alberta Medical Association.

== Early life ==
Harry Smith was born September 11, 1873, in New Hamburg, Ontario. He was educated in Oxford County and at the Woodstock Collegiate Institute in Woodstock, Ontario, and studied medicine at Trinity University in Toronto, from which he graduated in 1899. He did post-graduate work in Edinburgh, Scotland, and London, England, and was house surgeon at Toronto General Hospital upon his return.

In 1901, he moved west to Alberta and practiced medicine in Star for a year and a half before relocating again to Edmonton. There he specialized in surgery. In 1910 he was elected president of the Alberta Medical Association, and in 1912 was appointed to the board of directors of Alberta College.

In 1901, he married Martha Doyle, with whom he had a daughter. Martha died in January 1901, and Smith married Mabel Rife, with whom he had a son and a daughter.

== Politics ==
Smith ran for the Edmonton public school board in the 1910 municipal election, but was defeated, finishing fourth of six candidates in an election in which the top three were elected. In 1912 he ran for and was elected as alderman on the Edmonton City Council, finishing first of seventeen candidates. He did not seek re-election at the conclusion of his two-year term.

== Later life and death ==
In 1921, after several years as city coroner, Smith was appointed medical superintendent for the Royal Alexandra Hospital, where he was credited with vastly improving the hospital's financial position and with advocating for the creation of a children's hospital. He remained active with the Masons and the Independent Order of Odd Fellows, and was a Methodist.

He was taken with erysipelas October 21, 1928, and died three days later.
