= John Egbert Lundy =

Canadian politician (1872–1949)

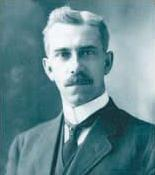

Alderman on the Edmonton City Council
- In office December 14, 1908 – December 8, 1913

Personal details
- Born: September 18, 1872
- Died: October 13, 1949 (aged 77)
- Profession: Businessman

John Egbert Lundy (September 18, 1872 – October 13, 1949) was a politician in Alberta, Canada and a municipal councillor in Edmonton.

== Biography ==
Lundy was born in Halton County, Ontario. He went to high school in Brampton, and upon graduation worked in wholesale and retail hardware in Guelph. He came west during the Klondike Gold Rush, and eventually came to Edmonton to work for the Ross Brothers hardware firm, which was co-owned by city alderman James Ross. He later partnered with George MacLeod to form Lundy & McLeod, a real estate firm.

He was elected to Edmonton City Council in the 1908 Edmonton election, when he finished second of thirteen candidates in the race for alderman. He was re-elected in the 1910 election, when he finished first of eleven candidates, but this two-year term was truncated by Edmonton's amalgamation with Strathcona, which meant that Lundy had to seek re-election in the February 1912 election. He did, and won another two-year term. He did not re-enter politics at this term's conclusion.

While an alderman, he chaired the parks and industries committee and was instrumental in the design, acquisition, and development of the 50 Mile River Drive.
