= William Short (Alberta politician) =

Canadian politician

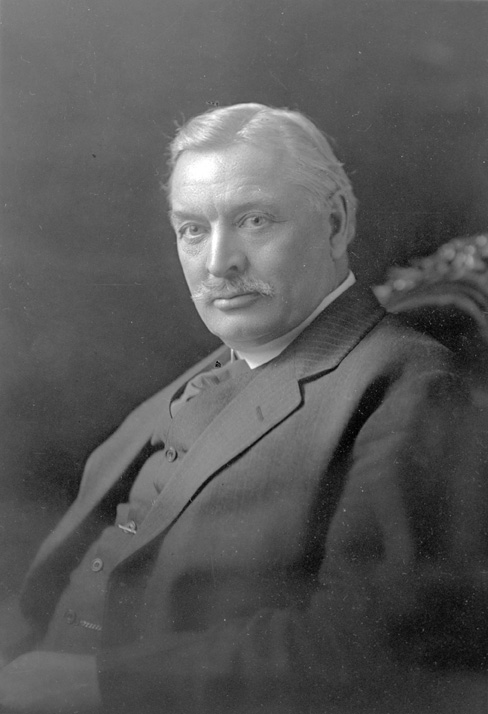

7th Mayor of Edmonton
- In office December 9, 1901 – December 12, 1904
- Preceded by: Kenneth W. MacKenzie
- Succeeded by: Kenneth W. MacKenzie
- In office December 9, 1912 – December 8, 1913
- Preceded by: George S. Armstrong
- Succeeded by: William J. McNamara

Personal details
- Born: January 11, 1866 Elora, Canada West
- Died: January 27, 1926 (aged 60) Edmonton, Alberta
- Spouse(s): Henrietta McMaster (one son, one daughter)
- Education: University of Toronto
- Profession: Lawyer

William Short (January 11, 1866 – January 27, 1926) was a politician in Alberta, Canada and a two time mayor of Edmonton.

== Biography ==
Short was born July 11, 1866, near Elora, Canada West and studied law at the University of Toronto before coming to Alberta in 1889. He articled to James Alexander Lougheed from 1891 until 1894, when he was called to the provincial bar. That year, he moved to Edmonton and opened a law practice before partnering with Charles Cross in 1900 to form Short & Cross (which still exists today under the name Duncan Craig LLP). He married Henrietta McMaster on February 7, 1900; the pair had one son and one daughter.

In 1899, Short was elected to sit as a public school trustee, which he did until he was acclaimed as mayor during the 1901 election. He faced no opposition to his re-election bid in 1902, and defeated his former school board colleague H. C. Taylor in the 1903 election to retain the title. This allowed him to be mayor when Edmonton's status changed from town to city in 1904, and to author the city charter. He did not seek another term in the 1904 election. During this first stint as mayor, Short oversaw the extension of the railroad to the north side of the North Saskatchewan River in 1902 (an event which occasioned the proclamation of a civic holiday by Mayor Short).

He returned to the mayoralty in December 1912 by defeating two candidates, including future mayor Joseph Clarke. His re-election bid in 1913 was foiled by William McNamara, making him the first mayor in Edmonton's history to lose a re-election bid. After this defeat, Short did not return to politics.

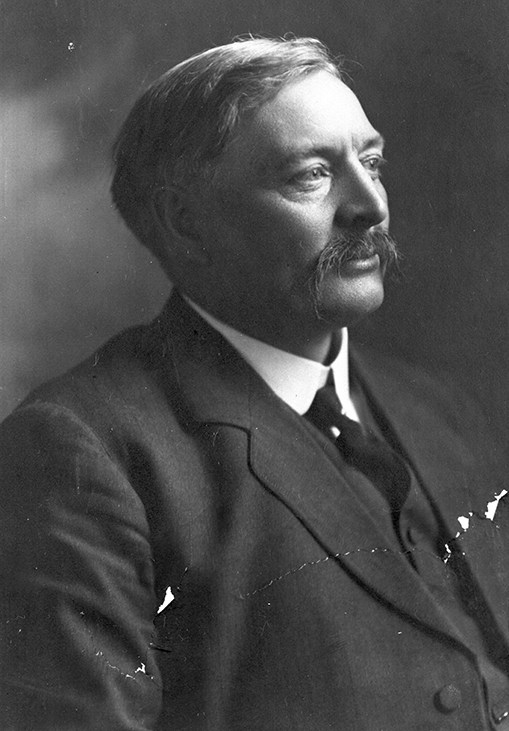
William Short.

William Short was active with the Masons, the Edmonton Board of Trade, and the Conservative Party of Alberta. He was also an enthusiastic motorist and owned one of Edmonton's first automobiles. He died January 27, 1926.

William Short Road in Edmonton is named in his honour.

== Sources ==
- Edmonton Public Library biography of William Short
- City of Edmonton biography of William Short
- History of Duncan & Craig law firm
- Real Estate Weekly account of the history of the railroad in Edmonton
