= Alberta Association of Architects =

Logo of the association

The Alberta Association of Architects (AAA) is the regulatory body responsible for registering and licensing all architects and interior designers legally entitled to practice in the Province of Alberta in Canada. They are sometimes involved in legal discussion between Alberta and individual architects regarding their conduct.

== History ==
Alberta's Architects Act, which established AAA, was among the first passed when the Alberta legislature met in 1906. Since 1978, AAA have been based in the Duggan House. AAA are members of Regulatory Organizations of Architecture in Canada, a body made up of each provincial architectural licensing organisation.

AAA opened to women in 1925 when Esther Hill, Canada's first female architect was admitted after being denied in 1921. Nearly fifty years later, Freda O’Conner became AAA's first female president and the first among any Canadian architects' association.

In 2020, AAA expanded their remit with the Experienced Interior Designers Pathway, a temporary program meant to expedite licensure for interior designers, which built on their 1982 inclusion.

== Awards ==
They issue the Tom Sutherland award annually in memorial to an Edmonton architect and collaborate with neighboring provinces on the Prairie Design Awards.
