= James Mould (politician) =

Canadian politician (1870–1944)

James William Mould
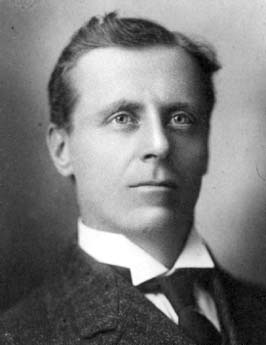

Alderman on the Edmonton City Council
- In office December 13, 1909 – February 16, 1912

Personal details
- Born: December 8, 1870 Kent, England, UK
- Died: February 21, 1944 (aged 73) Edmonton, Alberta, Canada
- Spouse: Margaret Lefley
- Children: Seven
- Profession: Plumber

James William Mould (December 8, 1870 – February 21, 1944) was a politician in Alberta, Canada and a municipal councillor in Edmonton.

== Early life ==
Mould was born in Kent on December 8, 1870. His family immigrated to Canada in 1872, taking up residence in Winnipeg, where Mould attended North Ward School. He apprenticed as a plumber with Plaxton Brothers in Winnipeg, where he worked until 1889. In 1901, he started his own business, Winnipeg Plumbing & Heating Company. It joined with three other firms in 1904 to form Standard Plumbing & Heating Company, which had offices in Winnipeg and Edmonton. In 1905, he moved to Edmonton, and became manager of the Edmonton office in April 1906.

In 1895 he married Margaret Lefley, with whom he would have seven children.

== Political career ==
Mould sought election to the Edmonton City Council in the 1909 municipal election. He finished third of ten candidates, and became one of four elected to a two-year term. He did not seek re-election at its conclusion.

== Personal life and death ==
Mould was active with the Masons, the Baptist Church, and the Liberal Party of Canada.

James William Mould died in 1944.
