= Charles Gowan =

American judge (1850–1938)

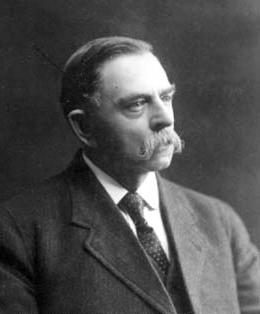

Alderman on the Edmonton City Council
- In office December 12, 1910 – May 14, 1912

Personal details
- Born: February 6, 1850 New York
- Died: July 3, 1938 (aged 88) Edmonton, Alberta
- Spouse: Harriet Howland
- Profession: Logger, rancher

Charles Gowan (February 6, 1850 – July 3, 1938) was an American and Canadian pioneer and politician. He served as mayor of Antigo, Wisconsin and as a municipal councillor in Edmonton, Alberta.

== Biography ==
Charles Gowan was born in New York and migrated to Wisconsin early in life. There, he became a justice of the peace and one of the first school officers in Shawano County He served as mayor of Antigo and married Harriet Howland in 1869 before emigrating to Canada in 1900 at the age of 50. He settled near Namao, Alberta, then moved to Edmonton in 1904 where he engaged in logging and ranching.

Gowan ran for alderman on the Edmonton City Council during the 1910 election. He was elected to a two-year term by finishing fourth of eleven candidates (Edmonton elected five that year). His term, along with those of his colleagues, was truncated by the merger of Edmonton and Strathcona in early 1912. He was re-elected to another two-year term in the amalgamated city's first election, finishing second of eighteen candidates (Edmonton elected ten that year) but resigned three months into this term.

He sought election again later that year, but finished seventh out of seventeen candidates (Edmonton electing five that year) and was unsuccessful.

In his final bid for elected office, he finished fifteenth of eighteen in the 1914 election, when Edmonton elected six.

Charles Gowan died in Edmonton July 3, 1938.
