= 1911 Edmonton municipal by-election =

Municipal election in Alberta, Canada

In 1911, James McKinley, an alderman on Edmonton City Council since 1910, resigned his position to protest the firing of two city commissioners. A by-election to fill the vacancy he left was held on August 14 of that year. McKinley himself was a candidate, as was Thomas Bellamy. Bellamy defeated McKinley, 966 votes to 576.
