= Joseph Driscoll (Canadian politician) =

Canadian politician (1876–1942)

Daniel Joseph Driscoll
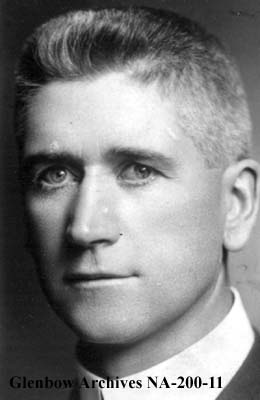

Alderman on the Edmonton City Council
- In office December 9, 1912 – December 14, 1914

Personal details
- Born: June 11, 1876 Arthur, Ontario, Canada
- Died: January 2, 1942 (aged 65) Edmonton, Alberta, Canada
- Party: Alberta Liberal Party
- Spouse: Emma Johnson
- Children: 3 sons (Daniel, Emmett, Joseph) and 5 daughters (Helen, Aileen, Josephine, Mary, Genevieve)

Daniel Joseph Driscoll (June 11, 1876 – January 2, 1942) was a Canadian politician and a municipal councillor in Edmonton, Alberta.

== Early life ==
Driscoll was born on June 11, 1876, in Arthur, Ontario to Daniel Driscoll and Bridget Roach, a New Brunswicker of Irish descent. After being educated in Arthur, he served as a court clerk before coming to Edmonton in 1906. There he opened the Joe Driscoll Sporting Goods Company and became prominent in the city's sporting community.

He married Emma Johnson on August 11, 1908. The pair had three sons and five daughters.

== Political career ==
Driscoll first sought political office in the December 1912 municipal election, when he was elected to the Edmonton City Council for a two-year term by placing third of seventeen candidates. His eighth-place finish (out of fourteen candidates) in the 1914 election was not good enough to get him re-elected. He made an attempt to return to office in the 1915 election, when he placed ninth.

After this defeat, he shifted focus, running for a seat on the separate (Roman Catholic) school board in the 1918 election. He finished first of five candidates, but did not seek re-election at the conclusion of his two-year term.

== Later life ==
Driscoll continued to serve a prominent role in Edmonton's sporting community, and was president of the Edmonton Eskimos at the time of their first Grey Cup appearance in 1921. He also served as President of the Alberta branch of the Amateur Athletic Union of Canada and or the Canadian Amateur Hockey Association. Politically, he was president of the Edmonton Liberal Association.

Joseph Driscoll died in Edmonton on January 2, 1942, at the age of 65.
