= Joseph Byron =

English photographer

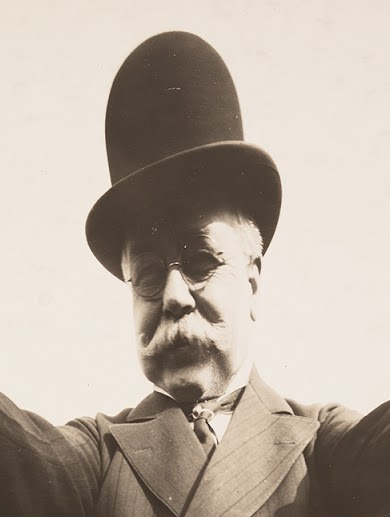
- Byron in a self portrait circa 1909 in a distorted wide angle lens
- Born: January 1847; Nottingham, England
- Died: May 28, 1923 (aged 76); New York City
- Occupation: Photographer
- Employer: Byron Company
- Spouse: Julia Lewin
- Children: Percy Claude Byron (1878–1959); Mrs. Herbert Horne; Mrs. David Stott; Florence Mabel Byron

Joseph Byron (January 1847 – May 28, 1923) was an English photographer who founded the Byron Company in Manhattan.

== Biography ==
Byron was born in England in January 1847. His father, grandfather, and great-grandfather were all great photographers. He received a commission from the British government to photograph the conditions in English coal mines. He emigrated to the United States in 1888 with his children, Percy Claude Byron, Florence Mabel Byron (1880–?), and Georgina Byron (1883–?). In 1892 he opened his commercial studio in Manhattan.

Byron's specialty was photographing Broadway shows and other stage productions. Byron also documented life in New York City with his camera: street scenes, theater performances, leisure activities and the American upper class. He also captured other scenes from New York in photographs: capturing tenement interiors, industrial zones, pastoral yards, and riverscapes.

His son was the photographer Percy Claude Byron. Percy was "the premier maritime photographer of his generation". Byron worked for The New York Times in the 1890s. He died on May 28, 1923, in Manhattan.

== Archive ==
- 22,000 photos at the Museum of the City of New York from between 1890 and 1942.
