= James Hyndman (politician) =

Canadian politician (1874–1971)

James Duncan Hyndman
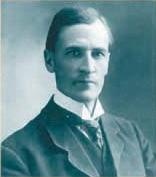

Alderman on the Edmonton City Council
- In office December 13, 1909 – February 16, 1912

Personal details
- Born: July 29, 1874 Charlottetown, Prince Edward Island
- Died: October 11, 1971 (aged 97) Ottawa, Ontario
- Party: Independent (municipally)
- Other political affiliations: Conservative Party of Alberta, Conservative Party of Canada
- Spouse: Ethel Davies
- Children: Five
- Education: Prince of Wales College
- Profession: Lawyer

James Duncan Hyndman, CBE (July 29, 1874 – October 11, 1971) was a Canadian politician, lawyer, and judge. He served as a municipal councillor in Edmonton, Alberta, and was the youngest person ever appointed to the Supreme Court of Alberta.

== Early life ==
Hyndman was born in Charlottetown, Prince Edward Island on July 29, 1874. He graduated from the Prince of Wales College in Charlottetown and articled as a lawyer with Angus Alexander McLean, the Member of Parliament for Queen's, and was called to the Prince Edward Island bar in 1899. The same year, he moved to Portage la Prairie, Manitoba, where he practised law with his uncle in the firm MacDonald and Hyndman. He came to Edmonton in 1903, and worked with the firm Kennedy and Hyndman (which would become Hyndman and Hyndman in 1905).

In 1902 he married Ethel Davies, with whom he would have five children.

== Political career ==
Hyndman served as president of the Alberta Conservative Association from 1907 until 1909. During this time, he ran unsuccessfully for the House of Commons of Canada as a Conservative candidate in the riding of Edmonton; he finished second to Liberal Frank Oliver in a two-person race.

He ran for Edmonton City Council in the 1909 election and was elected to a two-year term, finishing second of ten candidates. He did not run for re-election at the term's conclusion. He ran for the Legislative Assembly of Alberta in the 1913 provincial election as a Conservative in Sturgeon, but was defeated by Liberal John R. Boyle (himself a former Edmonton alderman). This was his last attempt at elected office.

== Judicial career ==
In 1914, Hyndman became the youngest person ever to be appointed a judge of the Supreme Court of Alberta. He served in this capacity until 1931, when he became the President of the Canadian Pension Appeal Court in Ottawa, a position he held until 1940. From 1940 until 1942 he served as Wartime Rental and Salaries Controller, in which capacity he heard appeals by German and Italian prisoners in Canada and supervised the Excess Profits Tax Act.

Between 1951 and 1954, Hyndman served as deputy judge of the Exchequer Court of Canada. He was also commissioner of the War Claims Commission and the Great Lakes Security Acts Board. In 1961-1962 he advised Finance Minister Donald Fleming on claims by Canadians against Japan as a result of the Second Sino-Japanese War.

== Personal life, death, and legacy ==
Hyndman was an active Mason. He was inducted as a Commander of the Order of the British Empire in 1948.

His grandson, Lou Hyndman, served as a Progressive Conservative member of the Legislative Assembly of Alberta (representing Edmonton West from 1967 until 1971 and Edmonton-Glenora from 1971 until 1986) and provincial treasurer.

James Duncan Hyndman died October 11, 1971, at the age of 97. Hyndman Crescent and Road, streets in Edmonton, are named in his honour.
