= Herman McInnes =

Canadian politician (1862–1923)

Herman Lewis McInnes
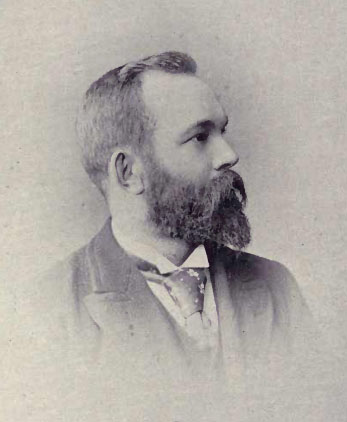

Alderman on the Edmonton City Council
- In office December 9, 1907 – May 7, 1912

Personal details
- Born: October 13, 1862 Saint John, New Brunswick
- Died: July 16, 1923 (aged 60) Edmonton, Alberta
- Party: Conservative
- Education: Manitoba Medical College (now part of the University of Manitoba
- Profession: Medical doctor

Herman Lewis McInnes (also Hermon McInnes or Herman McInnis) (October 13, 1862 – July 16, 1923) was a Canadian politician from Alberta, who served as a municipal councilor in Edmonton.

== Biography ==
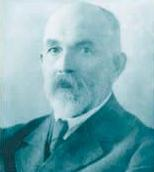
H. L. McInnes

Herman McInnes was born in Saint John, New Brunswick and educated in Fredericton. He worked as a druggist for five years in that city and in Winnipeg after graduating high school. He studied medicine at the Manitoba Medical College — now part of the University of Manitoba - from which he graduated in 1886. He served as an assistant surgeon during the North-West Rebellion.

He came to Edmonton in 1886 and took up the practice of medicine before going to Europe for further study from 1889 until 1892. He resumed his practice upon his return and also founded McInnes Lumber Company in 1902.

== Political career ==
He was elected to Edmonton City Council for a one-year term as an alderman in the 1907 municipal election, in which he finished fifth out of twelve candidates. He was re-elected to two year terms in the 1908 election (finishing third of thirteen candidates) and the 1910 election (finishing third of eleven candidates).

However, the latter term was truncated when Edmonton amalgamated with Strathcona and elections were held for an entirely new council. McInnes was re-elected for a one-year term in the 1912 Edmonton municipal election, but he resigned May 7, 1912.

== Later life and death ==
In 1912, McInnes retired from the practice of medicine to look after his other interests, which included the lumber company (which he sold in 1914) and prospecting for oil. He died in 1923.

=== Affiliations ===
He was a member of the Independent Order of Odd Fellows, the Masonic Order, the Conservative Party, and the Edmonton Philharmonic Society.
