= James McKinley (politician) =

Canadian politician (1877–1954)

James H. McKinley
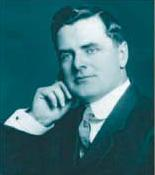

Alderman on the Edmonton City Council
- In office December 12, 1910 – 1911

Personal details
- Born: June 17, 1877 Lanark County, Ontario
- Died: August 25, 1954 (aged 77) New Westminster, British Columbia
- Spouse: Agnes Mary Barr

James Henry McKinley (June 17, 1877 – August 25, 1954) was a politician in Alberta, Canada and a municipal councillor in Edmonton.

He was born in Lanark County, Ontario on June 17, 1877 to William Henry McKinley and Jessie Burns. He married Agnes Mary Barr. He came to Edmonton in 1903 and opened the undertaking firm Connolly & McKinley in 1908. He was elected to Edmonton City Council in the municipal election that same year, finishing fourth of thirteen candidates in the race for alderman and winning a two-year term.

He was re-elected to a one-year term in the 1910 election, when he finished fifth of eleven candidates, but resigned in 1911 to protest the firing of two city commissioners. He ran in the ensuing by-election, but was defeated in a two person race by Thomas Bellamy. McKinley stayed out of politics thereafter. He died in New Westminster, British Columbia on August 25, 1954.
