= February 1912 Edmonton municipal election =

Municipal election in Alberta, Canada

- February 16, 1912

1 mayor and 10 councillors to Edmonton City Council
Candidate	George S. Armstrong	Bryce J. Saunders
Popular vote	1,791	1,072
Percentage	62.56	37.44
Mayor before election
Robert Lee
Elected mayor
George S. Armstrong

Creating a change in the normal pattern of autumn elections, Edmonton held a municipal election in February 1912 following the amalgamation of the cities of Strathcona and Edmonton. An unusually large number of city councillors and public school board trustees were elected at this time.

On September 27, 1911, the voters of Edmonton approved by plebiscite the amalgamation of Edmonton with Strathcona. A majority of Strathcona voters also voted in favour of amalgamation.

Amalgamation came into effect on February 1, 1912. In anticipation of this, no election was held December 11, 1911 as would normally have been required (municipal elections in Edmonton at the time being held the second Monday of every December). Instead, an elections was scheduled for February 16, 1912.

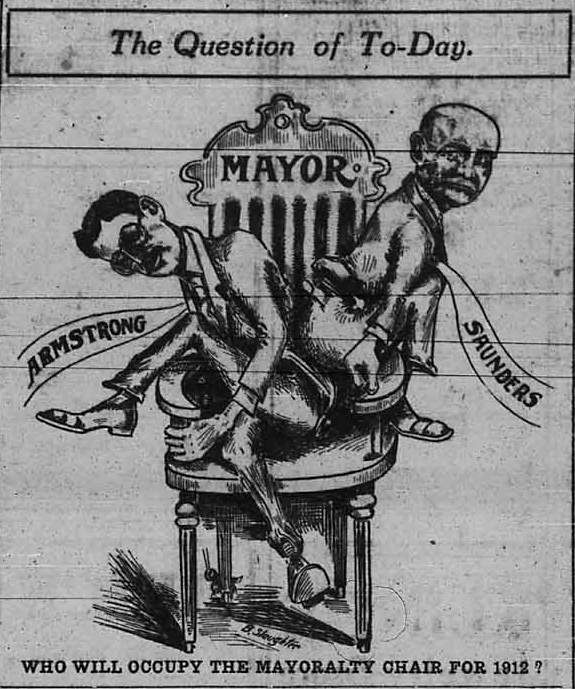
A cartoon appearing in the Edmonton Bulletin on the morning of the election, depicting George S. Armstrong and B.J. Saunders vying for the mayoralty.

== Positions to be elected ==
With the amalgamation, Council's size was increased by two members, bringing the total number of aldermen to ten. No wards were used. The councillors were elected at-large. and all ten positions were filled at the same time in February 1912.

Plurality block voting was used, with each voter casting up to ten votes. Due to a clause in the amalgamation agreement, in this election (and in each council hereafter to 1960) at least two of the elected councillors were required to come from the south side of the North Saskatchewan River.

In order to re-establish staggered terms for aldermen, the five most-popular of the aldermen elected in this election, (Henry Douglas, Charles Gowan, John Tipton, John Lundy, and Thomas J. Walsh), were elected to two-year terms, and the next five to one-year terms. The exception being that the most-popular southside candidate was elected to a two-year term and the least-popular of the elected southside candidates was elected to a one-year term. McInnis and Gowan, who were elected in February 1912, resigned in May, occasioning two by-elections in June.

In addition to electing city council, the February 1912 elections also elected the entirety of the seven-member board of trustees for the public school district (four members - Walter Ramsey, Bessie Nichols (the first woman to serve on a government body in Edmonton), Samuel Barnes, and Frank Crang - to two-year terms, three others to one-year terms) and three of five members of the board of trustees for the separate school board (Wilfrid Gariépy and Milton Martin having been elected to two-year terms in 1910).

== Voter turnout ==
There were 2870 ballots cast. Information about the number of eligible voters is no longer available.

Many of the voters on the voters list lived elsewhere but owned property in Edmonton. The previous year the proportion of absentee voters was estimated to be 25 percent in Edmonton and 40 percent in Strathcona.

== Results ==
(bold indicates elected, italics indicate incumbent)

=== Mayor ===
- **George S. Armstrong** - 1791
- Bryce J Saunders - 1072

=== Aldermen ===
Ten aldermen were elected at this time. The aldermanic election was conducted using Plurality block voting. Each voter could cast up to ten votes, About 17,000 votes were cast by the 2870 voters who participated in this election.

Elected

- **Henry Douglas** - 1640 elected to two year term (candidate for the Retail Merchants Association)
- **Charles Gowan** - 1230 elected to two year term
- **John Tipton** - 1227 (South Side) (Strath Board of Trade candidate elected to two year term
- **John Lundy** - 1220 elected to two year term
- **James East** (Labour-affiliated) - 1214 elected to one year term
- **Joseph Clarke** - 1174 elected to one year term
- **Herman McInnes** - 1164 elected to one year term
- **Thomas J. Walsh** - 1049 (South Side) elected to two year term
- **Gustave May** - 993 elected to one year term
- **Hugh Calder** - 795 (South Side) elected to one year term (Strath Board of Trade candidate)

Not elected

- D. B. Campbell - 835
- J. H. McDonald - 779 (South Side) (Strath Board of Trade candidate
- J. J. Denman - 757
- Thomas Grindley - 708
- Thomas Malone - 707 (South Side) (candidate for the Retail Merchants Association)
- J. Pollard - 659 (South Side)
- George Elliott - 526 (South Side) (Strath Board of Trade candidate
- A. Boileau - 297

=== Public School Trustees ===
Election was conducted using Plurality block voting. Each voter could cast up to seven votes.

- **Walter Ramsey** - 1531
- **Bessie H Nichols*** - 1446
- **S.A.G. Barnes** - 1348 (later Social Credit MLA)
- **William Clark** - 1145
- **John Park** - 1139
- **Frank Crang** - 839 (South Side) (father of Margaret Crang)
- **J G MacKenzie** - 610 (South Side)

(unsuccessful candidates not shown here)

- Bessie Nichols was the first woman to run for public office in Edmonton. As a property owner or tenant, she was able to vote and she owned property in Edmonton so was not barred from running for that reason but her candidacy was not secure until an amendment to the city charter was rushed through the Alberta Legislature just before the election was held.

=== Separate (Catholic) School Trustees ===
John Cashman, James Collisson, and Joseph Henri Picard were elected. Details are no longer available.
