= Henry Douglas (Alberta politician) =

Henry Ward Beecher Douglas
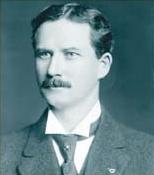

Alderman on the Edmonton City Council
- In office February 16, 1912 – December 8, 1913

Personal details
- Born: February 2, 1873 Kemptville, Ontario
- Died: April 6, 1944 (aged 71)
- Party: Independent
- Spouse: Marian Lockhart
- Children: 6
- Education: Manitoba College
- Profession: Businessman

Henry Ward Beecher Douglas (February 2, 1873 – April 6, 1944) was a businessman and politician in Alberta, Canada. He served as an alderman on the Edmonton City Council from 1912 until 1913.

== Early life ==
Douglas was born in Kemptville, Ontario on February 2, 1873. His family moved to Manitoba when he was a child, as his father was a pioneer missionary. He was educated in public schools in Winnipeg before studying classics at Manitoba College. He graduated with honours in 1898, whereupon he partnered with W. W. Miller to open a book and stationery business in Portage-la-Prairie. In 1902 he came to Edmonton and continued his business, incorporating as The Douglas Company Limited in 1905 (the company later changed its name to Douglas Printing Co. Ltd.).

== Politics ==
Douglas first sought political office in Edmonton's February 1912 municipal election, when he was elected to Edmonton City Council on the strength of first-place finish in an eighteen candidate field. He did not run for re-election at the conclusion of his term in December 1913.

In the 1915 election, Douglas was elected as a public school trustee after a third-place finish out of nine candidates. He was re-elected in 1917, when he topped the field of seven candidates. However, in the 1919 election, the Labour Party ran a full slate of candidates for the first time, and swept the school board elections. Douglas, running as an independent (as were all of the other non-Labour candidates) finished sixth of eight candidates and was defeated. He did not re-enter public life thereafter.

== Private life and death ==
Douglas was active with the Masons, the Kiwanis Club, the Edmonton Board of Trade, the Presbyterian Church, and the Liberals. He died April 6, 1944.
