= John Tipton (Alberta politician) =

Canadian and American politician, lawyer and coal miner

John Gaddis Tipton
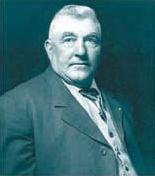

Alderman on the Edmonton City Council
- In office February 16, 1912 – December 8, 1913

Alderman on the Strathcona City Council
- In office 1908–1911

Personal details
- Born: January 27, 1849 Fairview, Illinois
- Died: October 9, 1914 (aged 65)
- Profession: Lawyer, coal miner, financier

John Gaddis Tipton (January 27, 1849 – October 9, 1914) was a Canadian and American politician, lawyer, and coal miner. He was an alderman in Strathcona from 1908 until 1911 and on Edmonton City Council from 1912 until 1913, and was a major force for the amalgamation of the two cities, which was effected February 1, 1912.

== Early life ==
Tipton was born in Fairview, Illinois January 27, 1849. He studied at Hedding College in Abingdon, and was admitted to the Illinois bar in 1874. He migrated to Alberta in 1894 and established a coal mine. He was admitted to the Law Society of Alberta in 1904, and also founded a real estate and insurance firm, Tipton & Sons Investment Company.

== Politics ==
He was elected to the city council of Strathcona in 1908, and served until 1911, when plebiscites in that city and Edmonton voted to merge the cities. Tipton had been a vocal advocate for this amalgamation, and was elected to the new city's first council in the 1912 election, when he placed third of eighteen candidates. He did not seek re-election at the term's conclusion in December 1913, and died less than a year later, on October 9, 1914, of liver cancer. He was survived by a wife and two sons.

== Honours ==
Tipton park in Edmonton is named in his honour.
