= James Kinney (politician) =

Canadian politician (1869–1941)

James A. Kinney
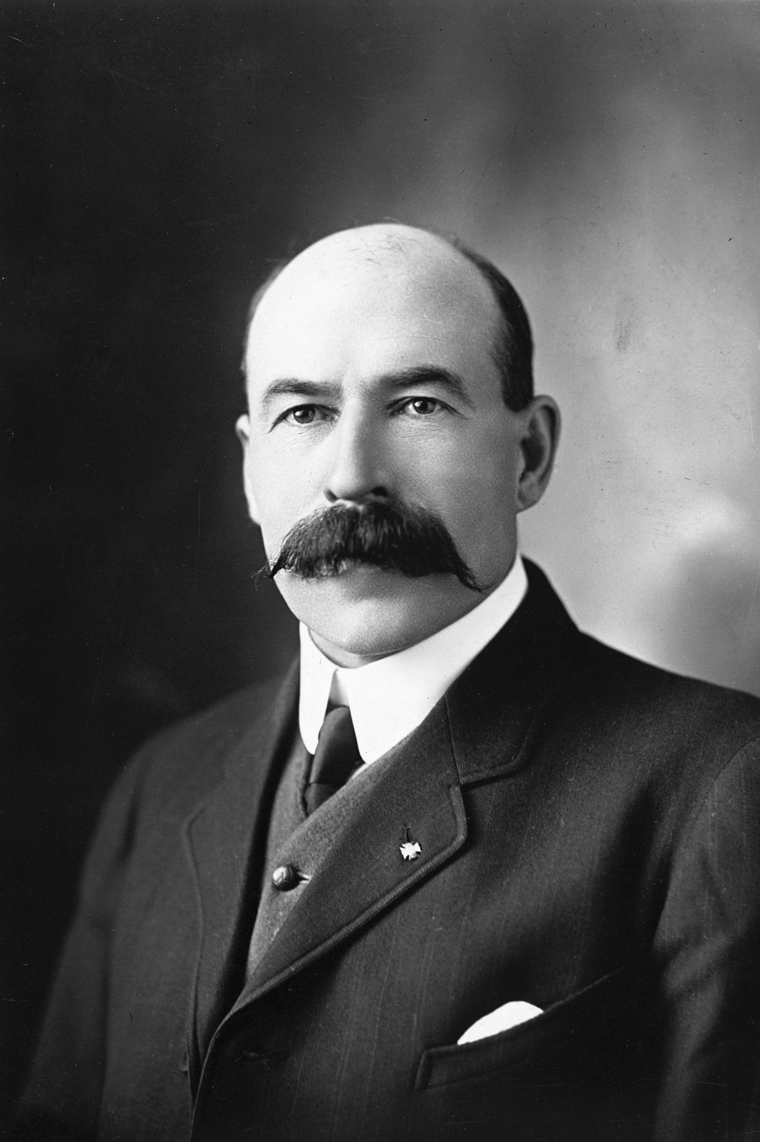

Alderman on the Edmonton City Council
- In office Jan. 1, 1914 – December 31, 1915
- In office Jan. 1, 1917 – December 1920

Personal details
- Born: December 10, 1869 Ontario, Canada
- Died: June 10, 1941 (aged 71) Edmonton, Alberta, Canada
- Party: Labour
- Spouse: Olive I. Kinney
- Profession: Carpenter, Labour leader

James Andrew Kinney (December 10, 1869 – June 10, 1941) was a politician in Alberta, Canada and the first Labour member of the Edmonton City Council.

Kinney was born in Ontario in 1869. He served as the first president of the Edmonton Trades and Labour Council in 1906, and was one of the first secretaries of the Edmonton Lodge of the International Brotherhood of Carpenters and Joiners in 1913, in which he served "many years", and at one time, being western Canada's representative for the International Carpenters' Union.

He served on the Edmonton city council 1914 to 1915 and 1917 to 1920.

He served as member of the Alberta Workmen's Compensation Board from 1918 to 1935, and was president of the Alberta Labour Federation in 1920.

Kinney died at his Edmonton home in 1941 following a brief illness. His remains were cremated
