= Strathcona, Alberta =

Former city in Canada

Strathcona South Edmonton (1891–1899)
- Former city
- Location of Strathcona in Edmonton
- Coordinates: 53.518°N 113.497°W
- Country: Canada
- Province: Alberta
- City: Edmonton
- Founded: September 25, 1891
- Incorporated
  - Town: May 29, 1899
  - City: March 15, 1907
- Amalgamated: February 1, 1912

Government
  - Administrative body: Edmonton City Council
- Elevation: 673 m (2,208 ft)

Strathcona was a city in Alberta, Canada, on the south side of the North Saskatchewan River. Originally founded in 1891 as a railway centre, it became a town in 1899, then a city in 1907. It amalgamated with the City of Edmonton in 1912.

== History ==
Population history
Year	Pop.	±%
1895	505	—
1899	1,156	+128.9%
1901	1,550	+34.1%
1906	2,921	+88.5%
1911	5,579	+91.0%
Sources: North-West Mounted Police (1895), Town of Strathcona (1899), and Statistics Canada (1901–1911)

Strathcona's recorded history began in the 1870s. Its first residents were an offshoot of the hangers-on and self-employed contractors who resided near the old Fort Edmonton on the north side of the river. This mixed community of British (especially Orkney), Québécois, Cree and Metis fur trade employees, pioneer farmers, hunters, and their families, was mostly replaced by eastern Canadian pioneer farmers (and land speculators) in the 1880s. This notably included the Papaschase First Nation, who were initially granted approximately 40 square miles (100 km^{2}) of reserve lands in the area through Treaty 6, but were allegedly dispersed in 1888 due to pressure from settlers who wanted to develop the land.

The Calgary and Edmonton Railway arrived in 1891, establishing South Edmonton centred on what is now Whyte Avenue. The townsite "Plan I" was registered September 25, 1891. Businesses, at first in quickly-built primitive shacks, some made of logs, provided goods and services to a flood of immigrants from eastern Canada, Britain and continental Europe, U.S. and other parts of the world that came by train to the area. It was thought that "South Edmonton" would overwhelm "Old Edmonton" on the north side but Strathcona's geographic difficulties prevented this. However, South Edmonton was in good enough position for businesses near the railway station to prosper. Over the following 20 years most of the community's primitive buildings were replaced by more substantial two-storey wood or even brick buildings, many of which exist to this day. The original Strathcona Hotel building and the Ross Block, both made larger in the intervening years, are survivors from the late 1800s.

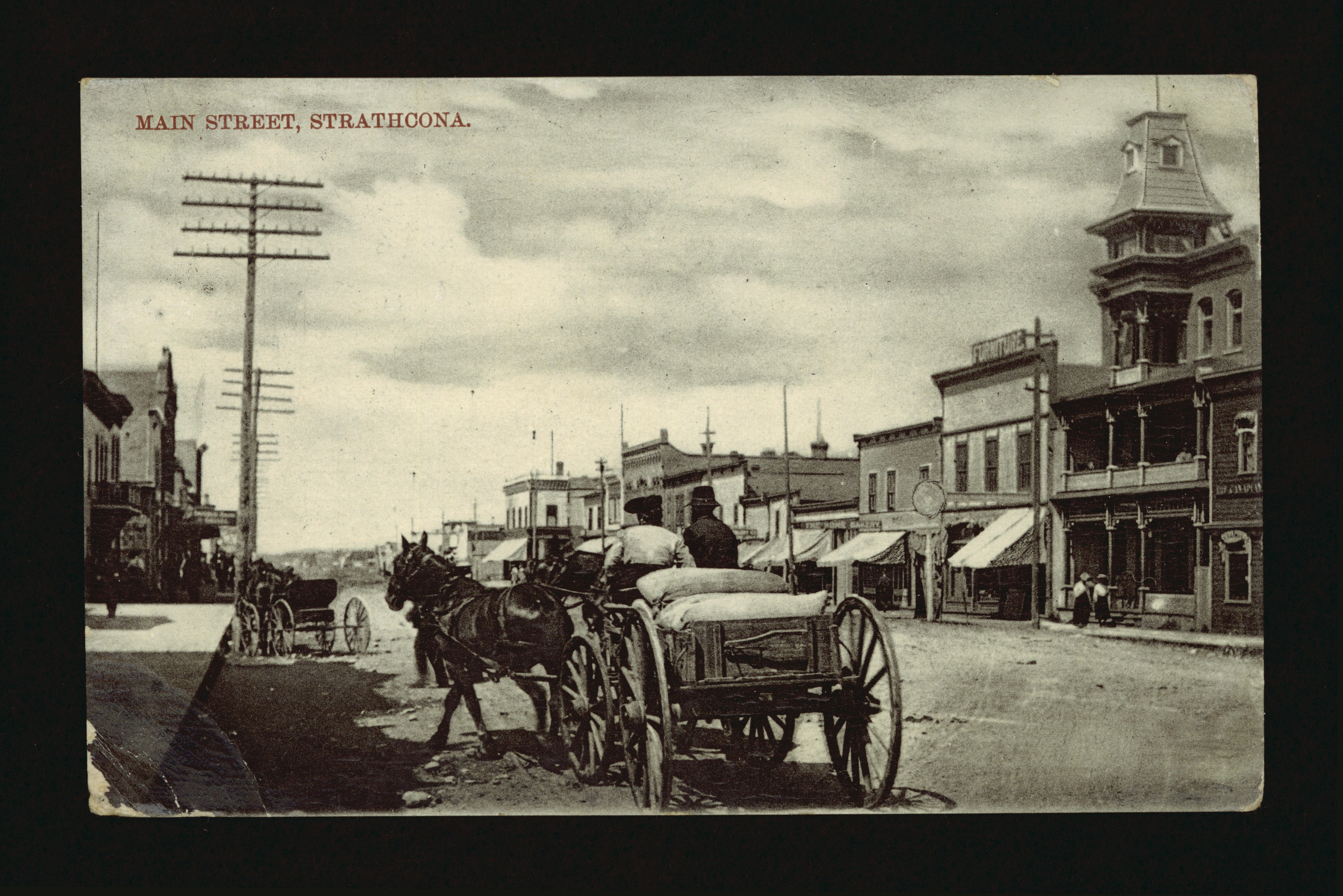
Storefronts along Main Street (later named Whyte Avenue)

On May 29, 1899, South Edmonton was incorporated as the Town of Strathcona, named after Lord Strathcona, Donald A. Smith. Smith was a prominent official in the Hudson's Bay Company and the Canadian Pacific Railway, which operated the Calgary and Edmonton Railway, the community's lifeline. The first mayor of Strathcona was Thomas Bennett. The town's original boundaries included all the numbered riverlots south of the river between No. 9 and No. 17, corresponding to the area from present-day 109 Street in the west to 97 Street in the east and from the river south to University Avenue, an area of 1,000 acres (4.0 km^{2}).

In 1902, alarmed by fires that swept through many prairie communities at the time, Strathcona's town council passed an ordinance requiring that all buildings be constructed of fire-resistant materials, such as brick. This, along with the limited municipal redevelopment occurring south of the river after amalgamation, means that Whyte Avenue and the surrounding area have one of the largest stocks of vintage buildings in western Canada.

After Strathcona became a city on March 15, 1907, Premier Alexander Cameron Rutherford, Strathcona's MLA, established the University of Alberta in Strathcona in 1907, with the purchase of riverlot No. 5 for the campus on the city's west edge. The land, consisting of 258 acres (1.04 km^{2}), cost the province $150,000. Until the first campus buildings were completed, the university found a home in the Queen Alexandra Public School, still standing on 106 Street, then in the building that is now Old Scona Academic High School.

In the 1911 census, Strathcona had a population of 5,579, while Edmonton had a population of 24,900. In anticipation of lower taxes and other benefits of being a larger city, an amalgamation of the two cities was proposed, in which Strathcona and Edmonton residents voted 667-96 and 518–178 in favour of the merger respectively. The amalgamation of the two cities went into effect on February 1, 1912, resulting in increased policing and more affordable transit for Strathconians crossing the river. At the time of the merger, Strathcona's boundaries were the North Saskatchewan River to the west and north, 91 Street to the east, and a combination of 62 Avenue and 68 Avenue to the south, with 111 Street forming the brief jog between the two avenues. Whitemud Creek made up the brief portion of the city's west boundary between 68 Avenue and the river. This included land annexed by Strathcona that was not developed until after the Second World War, well after the merger.

Today's neighbourhood of Strathcona covers the portion of the former City of Strathcona lying east of 107 Street, north of Whyte Avenue, west of the Mill Creek ravine and south of the North Saskatchewan River valley. Also, the historic commercial core of the former City of Strathcona has been designated as the Old Strathcona Provincial Historic Area.

== Government ==
Mayor of Strathcona
- Style: Mayor, His Worship
- Member of: Strathcona City Council
- Term length: 1 year
- Formation: May 29, 1899
- First holder: Thomas Bennett
- Final holder: Arthur Davies
- Abolished: February 1, 1912 (12 years)
- Succession: Mayor of Edmonton

Strathcona had seven mayors over nine stints in its over 12-year history as an incorporated municipality prior to amalgamating with the City of Edmonton in early 1912.

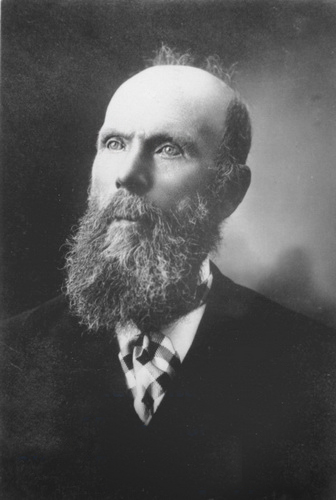
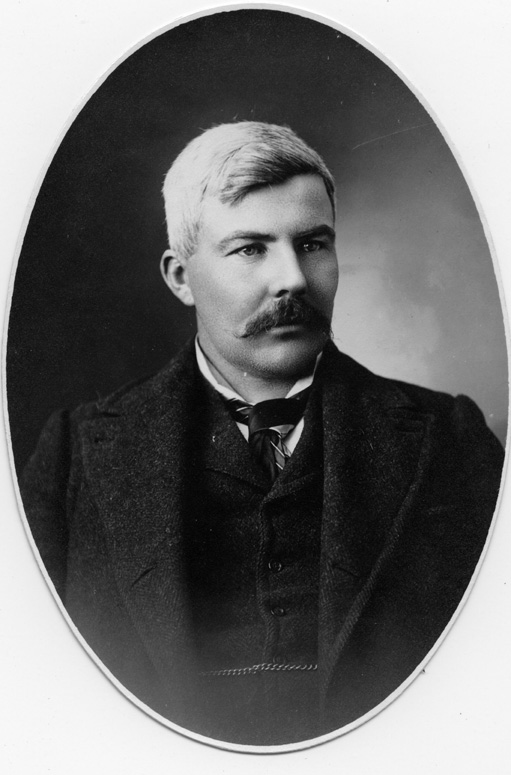
Thomas Bennett (left) was Strathcona's first mayor. John J. Duggan (right) served as mayor twice.

Mayors of Strathcona
Mayor	Elected	Term ended
Thomas Bennett	December 1899	December 1900
Robert Ritchie	December 1900	December 1901
John Joseph Duggan	December 1901	December 1903
John James Mackenzie	December 1903	December 1904
Arthur Davies	December 1904	December 1905
William Henry Sheppard	December 1905	December 1906
Nelson Darius Mills	December 1906	May 1908 (resigned)
John Joseph Duggan	May 1908	December 1910
Arthur Davies	December 1910	February 1912

== See also ==
- Edmonton annexations
- List of former urban municipalities in Alberta
