= 1901 Edmonton municipal election =

Municipal election in Canada

The 1901 municipal election was held December 9, 1901 for the purpose of electing a mayor and four aldermen to sit on the Edmonton Town Council, as well as five public school trustees and five separate school trustees.

There were six aldermanic positions on the council at the time, but two of them were already filled: William Thomas Henry and Joseph Morris had both been elected for a two-year term in 1900, and were still in office. Henry Goodridge had also been elected for a two-year term, but had resigned; accordingly, one of the positions up for election in 1901 - the one filled by Goodridge himself - was for only a one-year term.

== Voter turnout ==
Voter turnout figures for the 1901 municipal election are no longer available.

== Results ==
(bold indicates elected, italics indicate incumbent)

=== Mayor ===
William Short was acclaimed as mayor.

=== Aldermen ===
Cornelius Gallagher, Henry Goodridge, Edmund Grierson, and Phillip Heiminck were elected. Information about defeated candidates for this election is no longer available.

=== Public school trustees ===
Thomas Bellamy, Matthew McCauley, Kenneth McLeod, Alex Taylor, and Hedley C. Taylor were elected. Detailed results are no longer available.

=== Separate (Catholic) school trustees ===
Nicolas Dubois Dominic Beck, H Morel, Joseph Henri Picard, J Pomerleau, and Antonio Prince were elected. Detailed results are no longer available.
