= 1905 Edmonton municipal election =

Municipal election in Alberta, Canada

The 1905 municipal election was held December 11, 1905 for the purpose of electing a mayor and four aldermen to sit on the Edmonton City Council, as well as five public school trustees and five separate school trustees. As well the vote tallies were used to appoint two candidates to city council to fill two vacant seats. This was the second election to be held since Edmonton became a city.

There were eight aldermen on city council. Two of the positions were already filled: John R. Boyle and Thomas Bellamy were both elected to two-year terms in 1904 and were still in office (Boyle had been elected MLA in the 1905 provincial election and would resign as alderman in March 1906).

Charles May and Kenneth McLeod had also been elected to two years terms in 1904 but had resigned partway through their terms, leaving two seats vacant. May resigned to run for the mayor's post and was elected.

City council filled these seats after the 1905 election by appointment of the two most popular unsuccessful candidates - Robert Mays and David Latta. This equivalency of electing six members by relative vote standings while each voter only had four votes meant the election was an example of limited voting. In early 1906 the provincial Legislature passed amendments to the city charter, and since then, vacant seats are filled by a by-election, or during the period when staggered terms were used, as part of a general municipal election.

== 1906 by-election ==
On March 7, 1906, Alderman Boyle resigned from council when his move to fire city engineer was voted down.

Since his term was not due to expire until December, the city held a by-election on June 1 to fill his seat. John Calhoun defeated John McLennan and C.V. Semerad and was elected to serve out Boyle's term (to sit on council until December 1906). The vote tallies were Calhoun 188, McLennan 187, Semerad 146. (John McLennan was struck by lightning only a month after the by-election.)

== Electoral system ==
The mayor was elected through First-past-the-post voting.

The aldermen were elected through Plurality block voting, where each voter could cast up to four votes.

== Voter turnout ==
There were 993 ballots cast out of 1900 eligible voters, for a voter turnout of 52.3%.

== Results ==
(bold indicates elected, italics indicate incumbent)

=== Mayor ===
- **Charles May** - 627
- Arthur Cushing - 355

=== Aldermen ===
Four seats were to be filled

- **William Antrobus Griesbach** - 536
- **Robert Manson** - 477
- **Samuel Smith** - 324
- **Joseph Henri Picard** - 299
- Robert Mays - 296
- David Latta - 250
- William Clark - 237
- A York - 228
- Peter Butchart - 210
- Daniel Fraser - 167
- John Calhoun - 124
- George Sanderson - 121

== Two aldermen appointed ==
Following the election, the two most popular unsuccessful candidates in the aldermanic election - Robert Mays and David Latta - were named by council to fill the two seats left empty by the resignation of Charles May and Kenneth McLeod. May and McLeod had been elected for two years in 1904 but had resigned prior to the end of the first year in office. May had resigned to run for mayor.

== Aldermanic candidates' platforms ==
A. York said he was in favour of a better police force and fire brigade. "More should be hired and better pay offered. I stand strongly for municipal ownership of public utilities. The city currently has too many commissioners, One should be enough."

P.E. Butchart said he favoured municipal ownership of public utilities and also of making them the very best available, and would give all the aid he could to the betterment of the city's electric, light, telephone and waterworks systems. "I believe that having the executive work in connection with city government done by commissioners is the correct idea but the powers of the council and the commissioners should be more clearly defined, the council always being the governing body." He said vacancies occurring in the council should be filled by the people (by election, not by appointment as was done to fill the empty seats of Charles May and Kenneth McLeod).

York and Butchart signed Clark's nomination papers. Four seats being filled, the candidates were not in direct competition.

=== Public school trustees ===
W D Ferris, H A Gray, A E May, Alex Taylor, and Hedley C. Taylor were elected. Detailed results are no longer available.

=== Separate (Catholic) school trustees ===
Nicolas Dubois Dominic Beck, J Bilodeau, Wilfrid Gariépy, Joseph Henri Picard, and O Tessier were elected. Detailed results are no longer available.
