= 1898 Edmonton municipal election =

Municipal election in Alberta, Canada

The 1898 municipal election was held December 12, 1898. In previous elections, an entire town council had been elected at once for a one-year term. In 1898 Edmton began to use staggered aldermanic terms, such that half of the six aldermen would be elected each year to two-year terms. The mayor continued to be elected annually.

Because in the previous election all six aldermen had been elected to a one-year term, it was necessary to elect six aldermen in 1898. In order to set up the staggered terms, three were elected to one-year terms, and three to two-year terms.

In addition to the city council, five public school trustees and four private school trustees were elected.

== Voter turnout ==
Voter turnout figures for the 1898 municipal election are no longer available.

== Results ==
(bold indicates elected, italics indicate incumbent)

=== Mayor ===
Candidate	Votes	%
**William S. Edmiston**	**170**	**63.43%**
Cornelius Gallagher	98	36.57%

=== Aldermen ===
The election was held using Plurality block voting, where each voter could cast as many as six votes.

Candidate	Votes
**Kenneth McLeod**	**162**
**Kenneth W. MacKenzie**	**157**
**Alfred Jackson**	**126**
**Joseph Henri Picard**	**115**
**Alfred Brown**	**113**
**Richard Secord**	**106**
James Ross	101
N. White	98
Thomas Hourston	97
R. Hockley	80
Phillip Heiminck	78

=== Public school trustees ===
Thomas Bellamy, James Ross, Colin Strang, Alex Taylor, and Hedley C. Taylor were elected. Detailed results are no longer available.

=== Separate (Catholic) school trustees ===
N D Beck, Sandy Larue, Antonio Prince, and Georges Roy were elected. Detailed results are no longer available.
