= 1902 Edmonton municipal election =

Municipal election in Canada

The 1902 municipal election was held December 8, 1902 for the purpose of electing a mayor and three aldermen to sit on the Edmonton Town Council, as well as five public school trustees and five separate school trustees. There were six aldermanic positions on the council at the time, but three of them were already filled: Cornelius Gallagher, Edmund Grierson, and Phillip Heiminck had been elected for two-year terms in 1901, and were still in office.

== Voter turnout ==
Voter turnout figures for the 1902 municipal election are no longer available.

== Results ==
(bold indicates elected, italics indicate incumbent)

=== Mayor ===
William Short was acclaimed as mayor.

=== Aldermen ===
- **Daniel Fraser** - 200
- **James Ross** - 192
- **Arthur Cushing** - 166
- W H Heathcoate
- Joseph Henri Picard

Vote totals for defeated candidates are no longer available.

=== Public school trustees ===
H A Gray, Robert Lee, Kenneth McLeod, Alex Taylor, and Hedley C. Taylor were elected. Detailed results are no longer available.

=== Separate (Catholic) school trustees ===
Nicolas Dubois Dominic Beck, H Morel, Joseph Henri Picard, J Pomerleau, and Antonio Prince were elected. Detailed results are no longer available.
