= 1903 Edmonton municipal election =

Municipal election in Canada

The 1903 municipal election was held December 14, 1903 for the purpose of electing a mayor and three aldermen to sit on the Edmonton Town Council, as well as five public school trustees and five separate school trustees. There were six aldermanic positions on the council at the time, but three of them were already filled: Arthur Cushing, Daniel Fraser, and James Ross had been elected for two-year terms in 1902, and were still in office.

The 1903 election was the last to occur while Edmonton was still a town; the following year, it was incorporated as a city.

== Voter turnout ==
Voter turnout figures for the 1903 municipal election are no longer available.

== Results ==
(bold indicates elected, italics indicate incumbent)

=== Mayor ===
- **William Short** - 277
- Hedley C. Taylor - 246

=== Aldermen ===
- **Charles May** - 421
- **Edmund Grierson** - 282
- **Joseph Henri Picard** - 171
- William Antrobus Griesbach - 126
- Cornelius Gallagher - 122
- W J Bourchier - 108
- Samuel C Paton - 100
- W H Heathcoate - 39
- W J Webster - 31

=== Public school trustees ===
Arthur Cushing, Robert Lee, Kenneth McLeod, Alex Taylor, and Hedley C. Taylor were elected. Detailed results are no longer available.

=== Separate (Catholic) school trustees ===
Nicolas Dubois Dominic Beck, H Morel, Joseph Henri Picard, J Pomerleau, and Antonio Prince were elected. Detailed results are no longer available.
