= John Robert Boyle =

Canadian politician and judge (1871–1936)

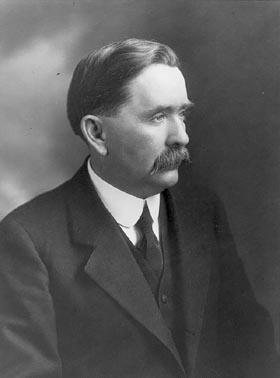

Leader of the Official Opposition in Alberta
- In office February 2, 1922 – April 12, 1924
- Preceded by: Albert Ewing
- Succeeded by: Charles R. Mitchell

Leader of the Alberta Liberal Party
- In office 1922–1924
- Preceded by: Charles Stewart
- Succeeded by: Charles R. Mitchell

Alberta Attorney General
- In office August 23, 1918 – July 18, 1921
- Preceded by: Charles Wilson Cross
- Succeeded by: John Edward Brownlee

Alberta Minister of Education
- In office May 4, 1912 – August 26, 1918
- Preceded by: Charles R. Mitchell
- Succeeded by: George P. Smith

Member of the Legislative Assembly of Alberta
- In office July 18, 1921 – August 27, 1924
- Constituency: Edmonton
- In office November 9, 1905 – July 18, 1921
- Preceded by: New District
- Succeeded by: Samuel Carson
- Constituency: Sturgeon

Alderman on the Edmonton City Council
- In office December 12, 1904 – May 7, 1906

Personal details
- Born: February 1 or 3, 1870 or 1871 Sykeston, Ontario
- Died: February 15, 1936 (aged 65–66) Ottawa, Ontario
- Party: Alberta Liberal Party
- Spouse: Dora Shaw (2 children)
- Profession: Lawyer

John Robert Boyle KC (February 3, 1871 – February 15, 1936) was a Canadian politician and jurist who served as a Member of the Legislative Assembly of Alberta, a cabinet minister in the Government of Alberta, and a judge on the Supreme Court of Alberta. Born in Ontario, he came west and eventually settled in Edmonton, where he practiced law. After a brief stint on Edmonton's first city council, he was elected in Alberta's inaugural provincial election as a Liberal. During the Alberta and Great Waterways Railway scandal, he was a leader of the Liberal insurgency that forced Premier Alexander Cameron Rutherford from office.

Though initially left out of cabinet by Arthur Sifton, Rutherford's successor, Boyle was named Minister of Education in 1912. He served in this capacity until 1918, during which time he alienated many non-English speakers by insisting on a unilingual English school system. In 1918 he was made Attorney-General. He retained his seat in the legislature after the Liberal defeat in the 1921 election and briefly served as leader of the Liberal opposition, but was appointed to the bench in 1924. He was still a judge when he died in 1936.

== Early life ==
Boyle was born in Sykeston, Ontario on February 3, 1871, of Scottish and Irish descent. His father died in 1884, and Boyle had to leave school to support his family; he eventually completed high school at Sarnia Collegiate Institute in 1888 and 1889. Following graduation, he taught school for three years in Lambton County. In 1894, he came west, though accounts vary as to exactly where he settled and for what purpose: he either studied law in Regina, taught school in Pilot Butte, or settled in Edmonton. He was reported to be teaching at Partridge Hill School near Horse Hills in 1896.

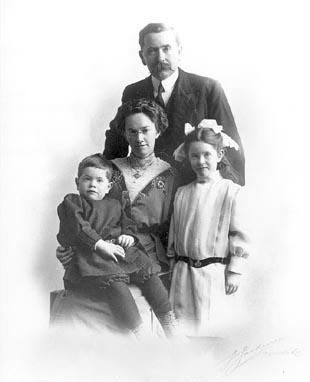
Boyle and his family

Sources agree that he was in the Edmonton area by 1896, and that he taught school there before being called to the bar in 1899. In 1902 he married Dora Christina Shaw at High River, Alberta, with whom he had three children (Helen, Frederick and Jean). He partnered with Hedley C. Taylor to form Taylor & Boyle, which was later known as Boyle, Parlee, Freeman, Abbott & Mustard; the firm was a forerunner of the present day Parlee McLaws. Boyle was made King's Counsel in 1913.

He ran in the 1904 Edmonton municipal election to elect the first Edmonton City Council (Edmonton had hitherto been a town). He finished second of seventeen candidates in the aldermanic race, and was elected to a two-year term. (Note: At the time, the city council included eight aldermen on staggered two-year terms. In the 1904 election, the top four finishers were elected to two-year terms, and the next four to one-year terms.) He resigned in 1906, before the completion of his term, causing a municipal by-election.

== Provincial politics ==
=== Early provincial career ===
In 1905, Boyle ran in Alberta's inaugural provincial election as the Liberal candidate in Sturgeon, where he defeated Conservative Frank Knight by a wide margin. Boyle served as Deputy Speaker in the 1st Alberta Legislative Assembly. (To focus on government affairs, Boyle resigned as Edmonton alderman on May 7, 1906, and a by-election was held to fill his empty seat.)

During his first term, Boyle supported the selection of Edmonton (over rival Calgary) as the new province's capital, and supported the Liberal government of Alexander Cameron Rutherford in its decision to borrow money to finance the creation of Alberta Government Telephones (abandoning its usual "pay as you go" approach). Boyle predicted that "Alberta, the first to undertake [a provincial government telephone system] will become a model for every province in the Dominion." He also sided with the government in its rejection of Conservative demands that it build and operate railways, as he felt that doing so would not be viable as long as the trunk lines were in private hands. He enthusiastically backed private construction of railways, however, and greeted the announcement of the Alberta and Great Waterways Railway—which was to run northward from Edmonton to Lac la Biche and later Fort McMurray—with what historian L. G. Thomas describes as "an extravagant eulogy...[speaking] of Lac la Biche as another Lake Louise, of Pullmans running from New Orleans to the Arctic circle, and of northern Alberta as a second Cobalt region."

=== Alberta and Great Waterways Railway scandal ===
The Rutherford government was comfortably re-elected in the 1909 election; Boyle himself was acclaimed in Sturgeon. Shortly after the elections, rumours began to spread that all was not well with the Alberta and Great Waterways Railway (A&GWR), to which the government had given loan guarantees and on whose behalf it had sold bonds in the London bond market. When the new legislature convened in February 1910, Boyle tabled a list of eleven questions for the government about the A&GWR. Rutherford, Minister of Railways as well as Premier, duly answered them in writing. Boyle found these answers unsatisfactory, and on February 21 gave notice of a motion to expropriate the A&GWR's bond money; he held that the government had raised more money for the A&GWR than was needed for construction. He also alleged that S. B. Woods, deputy to Attorney-General Charles Wilson Cross, had removed key components from the government's files on the A&GWR, in advance of their having been inspected by Boyle and Conservative leader R. B. Bennett.

Boyle's resolution rapidly divided the Liberal members between insurgents, led by Boyle and William Henry Cushing (who resigned his position as Minister of Public Works over the A&GWR issue), and loyalists, led by Rutherford and his remaining cabinet ministers, especially Cross. In the ensuing debate, several charges were levelled against Boyle himself: Agriculture Minister Duncan Marshall accused him of being motivated by his rejection for the position of A&GWR solicitor. Boyle admitted applying for the position, but denied that it had anything to do with his attacks on the government. The Edmonton Bulletin accused him of approaching two Liberal members who were also hotel keepers, Lucien Boudreau and Robert L. Shaw, and offering them immunity from prosecution for liquor offenses if they helped bring down Rutherford's government and replace it with one, led by Cushing, in which Boyle would be Attorney-General.

Though Rutherford survived a motion of non-confidence (moved by Ezra Riley and seconded by Boyle) by three votes, he was successfully pressured to resign by Lieutenant-Governor of Alberta George Bulyea. It had been expected that Cushing would replace Rutherford if the latter was defeated, but Bulyea and other prominent Liberals did not have confidence in him, and instead selected Arthur Sifton, Alberta's Chief Justice.

=== Minister of the Crown ===
Sifton left all major figures of the A&GWR affair, including Boyle, out of his first cabinet, and instead appointed fellow judge Charles R. Mitchell Attorney-General. However, in 1912 he decided that enough time had passed for old wounds to heal, and re-appointed Cross as Attorney-General. At the same time, he brought Boyle into his cabinet as Minister of Education. The law required that members newly admitted to cabinet resign their seats in the legislature and immediately contest a by-election; Boyle was re-elected in Sturgeon by a safe margin.

Boyle's time as Education Minister was tumultuous: many teachers enlisted to fight in World War I, and many others left the profession for more lucrative opportunities elsewhere. In its members' handbook, the Alberta Teachers' Association describes Boyle's efforts to remedy this situation as "heroic", citing in particular his convincing the legislature to set a minimum teachers' salary of $840 per year. Another of Boyle's tactics to alleviate the teacher shortage was to make it easier for teachers qualified in Quebec to teach in Alberta. However, this liberalization was subject to applicants' English proficiency: Boyle insisted that all instruction in Alberta schools be delivered in English. A Québécois teacher who passed an English language proficiency exam would be granted a temporary teaching license, which could be upgraded to a full Alberta Teaching Certificate with five months' study at a normal school. Boyle's insistence that Alberta was English offended not only the province's French Canadian minority, but also its Ukrainian-speaking population; an editorial in a Ukrainian newspaper maintained angrily that "the minister of education lies when he says that Alberta is an English province. Alberta is a Canadian province, where everyone has equal rights, including the Ukrainians." During a by-election in Whitford Boyle accused the Conservatives of promising Ukrainian language schools to court the immigrant vote.

In 1918, new premier Charles Stewart, who had succeeded Sifton when the latter entered federal politics in 1917, fired Cross and appointed Boyle Attorney-General. The following year Boyle introduced legislation formally making English Alberta's only official language. At the time, he boasted that in the past election "my majority came from English electors" in contrast to a Conservative who supported "Russian schools for Russian people". As Attorney-General, he also supported unsuccessful legislation to allow Imperial Oil to construct a pipeline in Alberta; in response to bipartisan opposition calling for pipelines to be common carriers, he said that to adopt such a course would be to tell oil companies that they "were free to spend vast sums in exploration work but if oil were found, they were not to pipe it out."

One of Boyle's chief responsibilities as Attorney-General was to enforce Alberta's recently enacted prohibition. This proved difficult, as the law was widely disparaged—not least by judges, who reputedly presided over liquor trials while hungover. In 1921, Boyle estimated that bootleggers were profiting from prohibition to the tune of Can$7 million. He was denounced by supporters of prohibition for his ineffectiveness at enforcing it, and by its opponents for "arrogating to himself the powers of a czar."

In the 1921 election, Boyle both sought re-election in Sturgeon and election in the new multi-member constituency of Edmonton. He was defeated in the former but victorious in the latter, making him one of two members from the 1st Alberta Legislative Assembly to be elected to the 5th; the other was Cross, Boyle's predecessor as Attorney-General and rival from the Alberta and Great Waterways Affair. (Note: Boyle's 1924 resignation would leave Cross as the sole survivor for slightly over a year, until he too resigned.) Provincially, the Liberals were soundly defeated by the United Farmers of Alberta (UFA), which, contesting their first election, won 39 seats to the Liberals' 14.

=== Leader of the Alberta Liberals ===
Late in Stewart's term as premier, there had been speculation that he would resign due to ill-health, and Boyle was among the candidates mentioned as possible successors. When Stewart did resign, immediately following the 1921 election, Boyle was selected to replace him. In the assessment of Lakeland College historian Franklin Foster, Boyle "showed vigour" in the legislature, where he presented a strong opposition to the new UFA government of Herbert Greenfield. Even so, he showed some private courtesy: when John Edward Brownlee, Greenfield's Attorney-General and his strongman in the legislature, missed a session due to illness, Boyle assured him that the Liberals would not attack the government too vigorously in his absence.

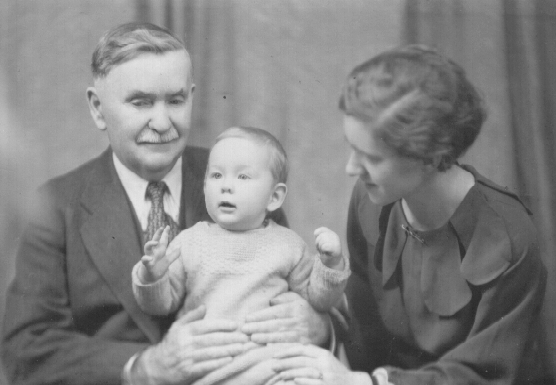
Boyle in 1935 with his daughter, Helen, and grandson, Ian

As leader of the Alberta Liberals, Boyle corresponded extensively with Liberal Party of Canada leader (and Prime Minister of Canada) William Lyon Mackenzie King; according to Foster, Boyle's letters to King were "a mixture of useless information and pleas to be rescued by an appointment to the bench." It is possible that one of his letters had some impact on history, however: in 1924, while Greenfield was attempting to negotiate control of Alberta's natural resources from King's federal government, Boyle sent King a letter warning him that the UFA was doomed in the next election unless "something extraordinary happens. That extraordinary thing which Greenfield wants to happen now is obtaining from you the natural resources at once." King drew out negotiations until Greenfield returned to Alberta empty-handed; soon after, Greenfield was forced from office by his own backbenchers, and replaced by Brownlee.

== Judicial career and later life ==
In 1924, Boyle was appointed to the Supreme Court of Alberta, and resigned from the legislature. He was succeeded as Liberal leader by another former Attorney-General, Charles R. Mitchell. As judge, Boyle once refused to issue an injunction to end a coal miners' strike that had turned violent, because he believed that the Alberta Provincial Police could contain the violence if properly instructed (another judge later issued the injunction). It was also before Boyle that the statement of claim was filed in MacMillan v. Brownlee, the case that forced Brownlee to resign as premier. (Note: Boyle did not preside over the case itself, which was tried by William Carlos Ives.)

Boyle was a member of the Presbyterian Church, the Masonic Order, and the Independent Order of Odd Fellows. He was still sitting as a judge when he died February 15, 1936, on his way to Jamaica. The Edmonton neighbourhood of Boyle Street and the village of Boyle are named in his honour; perhaps ironically, the latter lies on what was once the Alberta and Great Waterways Railway line.

== Electoral record ==
1921 Alberta general election: Edmonton
Party	Candidate	Votes	%	Elected
Liberal	Andrew Robert McLennan	6,498	36.20%	✓
Liberal	John Campbell Bowen	5,803	32.33%	✓
Liberal	Nellie McClung	5,388	30.02%	✓
Liberal	John Robert Boyle	5,361	29.86%	✓
Liberal	Jeremiah Wilfred Heffernan	5,289	29.46%	✓
United Farmers	William Jackman	4,978	27.73%	–
Conservative	Albert Freeman Ewing	4,777	26.61%	–
Labour	A. A. Campbell	3,736	20.81%	–
Conservative	Herbert Howard Crawford	3,553	19.79%	–
Conservative	Elizabeth Ferris	3,188	17.76%	–
Labour	Robert McCreath	2,931	16.33%	–
Independent	Joseph Woods Adair	2,571	14.32%	–
Labour	Elmer Roper	2,515	14.01%	–
Conservative	Ambrose Upton Gledstanes Bury	2,509	13.98%	–
Conservative	William A. Wells	2,329	12.97%	–
Independent	James Kennedy Cornwall	2,082	11.60%	–
Independent	A. L. Marks	1,744	9.72%	–
Independent Liberal	Gerald Pelton	1,467	8.17%	–
Independent	William Short	1,447	8.06%	–
Independent Labour	William R. Ball	1,409	7.85%	–
Independent	A. Boileau	1,226	6.83%	–
Independent Labour	Mary Cantin	1,133	6.31%	–
Independent Labour	Ernest Brown	1,073	5.98%	–
Independent Labour	James Bailey	941	5.24%	–
Independent Labour	Joe E. White	927	5.16%	–
Labour Socialist	Marie Millard	883	4.92%	–
Total votes cast		17,951	–	–
Rejected, spoiled and declined		N/A	–	–
Eligible electors / turnout		N/A	N/A	N/A
Source(s) Source: "Edmonton Official Results 1921 Alberta general election". Alberta Heritage Community Foundation. Election held under multiple non-transferable vote for five members to the Legislative Assembly.

1921 Alberta general election: Sturgeon
Party	Candidate	Votes	%	±%
United Farmers	Samuel Allen Carson	2,815	59.09%	–
Liberal	John Robert Boyle	1,949	40.91%	-6.28%
Total		4,764	–	–
Rejected, spoiled and declined		N/A	–	–
Eligible electors / turnout		6,299	75.63%	-17.94%
United Farmers gain from Liberal		Swing		3.99%
Source(s) Source: "Sturgeon Official Results 1921 Alberta general election". Alberta Heritage Community Foundation.

1917 Alberta general election results (Sturgeon)		Turnout 93.5%	
Liberal	John Robert Boyle	1,546	47.19%
Conservative	J. Sutherland	1,212	37.00%
Independent	H. Mickleson	518	15.81%
1913 Alberta general election results (Sturgeon)		Turnout 69.9%	
Liberal	John Robert Boyle	936	62.73%
Conservative	James Duncan Hyndman	556	37.27%
1912 by-election results (Sturgeon)		Turnout N.A.	
Liberal	John Robert Boyle	1,173	66.08%
Conservative	A. W. Taylor	602	33.92%
1909 Alberta general election results (Sturgeon)		Turnout N/A	
Liberal	John Robert Boyle	Acclaimed	
1905 Alberta general election results (Sturgeon)		Turnout N.A.	
Liberal	John Robert Boyle	721	76.78%
Conservative	Frank Knight	218	23.22%
1904 Edmonton municipal election results (aldermanic candidates) (eight elected)		Turnout N.A.	
	Charles May	471	63.39%
	John Robert Boyle	349	46.97%
	Kenneth McLeod	330	44.41%
	Thomas Bellamy	310	41.72%
	William Clark	277	37.28%
	Joseph Henri Picard	262	35.26%
	Daniel Fraser	257	34.59%
	William Antrobus Griesbach	239	32.17%
	Thomas Grindley	231	31.09%
	Gustave Koerman	224	30.15%
	Peter Butchart	204	27.46%
	Donald MacDonald	171	23.01%
	William Deyl	170	22.88%
	Herbert Charles Wilson	162	21.80%
	Frank Haldane	161	21.67%
	Samuel Paton	143	19.25%
	W. S. Weeks	80	10.77%

== Works cited ==
- Aunger, Edmund A. (2004). "Legislating Language Use in Alberta: A Century of Incidental Provisions for a Fundamental Matter". Alberta Law Review. 42 (2).
- Aunger, Edmund A. (2005). "One Language and One Nationality". In Connors, Richard; Law, John M. (eds.). Forging Alberta's Constitutional Framework. Edmonton, Alberta: University of Alberta Centre for Constitutional Studies. ISBN 978-0-88864-458-9.
- Breen, David (1993). Alberta's petroleum industry and the Conservation Board. Edmonton, Alberta: University of Alberta Press. ISBN 978-0-88864-245-5.
- Foster, Franklin L. (1981). John E. Brownlee: A Biography. Lloydminster, Alberta: Foster Learning Inc. ISBN 978-1-55220-004-9.
- Fudge, Judy; Tucker, Eric (2004). Labour Before the Law: The Regulation of Workers' Collective Action in Canada, 1900-1948. Toronto, Ontario: University of Toronto Press. ISBN 978-0-8020-3793-0.
- Hoerder, Dirk (1999). Creating societies: immigrant lives in Canada. Montreal, Quebec: McGill-Queens Press. ISBN 978-0-7735-1882-7.
- Mahe, Yvette T. M. (Fall 2002). "French Teacher Shortages and Cultural Continuity in Alberta Districts, 1892-1940". Historical Studies in Education. Archived from the original on 2011-07-16.
- Thomas, Lewis Gwynne (1959). The Liberal Party in Alberta. Toronto, Ontario: University of Toronto Press. ISBN 9780802050830.
