= 1904 Edmonton municipal election =

Municipal election in Alberta, Canada

The 1904 municipal election was held December 12, 1904 for the purpose of electing a mayor and eight aldermen to sit on the Edmonton City Council, as well as five public school trustees and five separate school trustees. It was Edmonton's first election as a city, and the first in which there were eight aldermanic positions instead of six. Because of this new composition of city council, all aldermanic positions were elected instead of only half as had been the case in previous elections and would again be the case in subsequent elections. Accordingly, even though Edmund Grierson, Charles May, and Joseph Henri Picard had been elected to two-year terms in the 1903 election, their terms were truncated. May and Picard decided to stand for re-election, while Grierson did not.

In order to re-establish staggered aldermanic terms, the top four finishers were elected to two-year terms ending in December 1906, while the next four were elected to one-year terms that ended in December 1905.

== Voter turnout ==
There were 743 ballots cast in the 1904 election. Information on the number of eligible voters is no longer available.

== Results ==
(bold indicates elected, italics indicate incumbent)

=== Mayor ===
Kenneth W. MacKenzie was acclaimed as mayor.

=== Aldermen ===
(each voter could cast up to eight votes)

- **Charles May** - 471
- **John Boyle** - 349
- **Kenneth McLeod** - 330
- **Thomas Bellamy** - 310
- **William Clark** - 277
- **Joseph Henri Picard** - 262
- **Daniel Fraser** - 257
- **William Antrobus Griesbach** - 239
- Thomas Grindley - 231
- Gustave Koerman
- Peter Butchart - 204
- Donald MacDonald - 171
- William Deyl - 170
- Herbert Charles Wilson - 162
- Frank Haldane - 161
- Samuel Paton - 143
- W S Weeks - 80

=== Public school trustees ===
Arthur Cushing, H A Gray, Kenneth McLeod, Alex Taylor, and Hedley C. Taylor were elected. Detailed results are no longer available.

=== Separate (Catholic) school trustees ===
Nicolas Dubois Dominic Beck, J Bilodeau, H Morel, Joseph Henri Picard, and J Pomerleau were elected. Detailed results are no longer available.
