= 1917 Edmonton municipal election =

Municipal election in Alberta, Canada

The 1917 municipal election was held December 10, 1917, to elect a mayor and seven aldermen to sit on Edmonton City Council and four trustees to sit on each of the public and separate school boards. There were also two plebiscite questions asked.

There were ten aldermen on city council, but three of the positions were already filled: George Pheasey, William Martin, and Charles Grant were all elected to two-year terms in 1916 and were still in office. Thomas Bellamy and James Macfie MacDonald were also elected to two-year terms in 1916, but both resigned to run for mayor. Two Southside candidates were guaranteed to win seats so to finish off Bellamy's and MacDonald's terms, the fourth-most-popular and fifth-most-popular northside candidates were elected to one year terms. Samuel McCoppen and Henri Martin were elected to one-year terms.

Kinney and McCoppen belonged to the Labour slate put forward by the Labour Representation League and were elected. The Labour slate was filled out by candidates White, Field and Scott, all unsuccessful.

The Southside was guaranteed to elect two members and as only two southsiders - Orlando Bush and W.W. Prevey - were running, they were secured of victory. Their names were kept on the ballot anyway.

Hyman King announced that he would be running for an aldermanic seat but he withdrew his nomination before election day.

There was no Business slate but at least two candidates had a relationship. Esdale published a list of women and men who endorsed his candidacy. The list included fellow candidate W.W. Prevey. As each voter could cast multiple votes, there was no direct competition between Esdale and Prevey.

There were seven trustees on the public school board, but three of the positions were already filled: Joseph Duggan, C. Frost, and William Rea had all been elected to two-year terms in 1915. The same was true of the separate board, where Joseph Gariépy, M. J. O'Farrell, and G. W. Curtis were all continuing.

The five mayoral candidates were the most in Edmonton's history up to that point. But despite the potential vote splitting, Evans was elected with a majority of votes.

== Electoral System ==
Mayor was elected through First-past-the-post voting.

Councillors were elected through Plurality block voting, with each voter allowed to cast as many as seven votes.

== Voter turnout ==
A total of 7895 ballots were cast out of 11,271 eligible voters, for a voter turnout of 70.0%.

== Results ==
- **bold** indicates elected
- italics indicate incumbent
- South Side indicates, where data is available, a representative for Edmonton's South Side, with a minimum South Side representation instituted after the city of Strathcona, south of the North Saskatchewan River, amalgamated into Edmonton on February 1, 1912.

=== Mayor ===
Party	Candidate	Votes	%
**Independent**	**Harry Marshall Erskine Evans**	**3,799**	**50.10%**
Independent	Joseph Clarke	1,791	23.62%
Independent	Samuel Barnes	788	10.39%
Independent	Thomas Bellamy	757	9.98%
Independent	James Macfie MacDonald	448	5.91%
	Total	7583	

=== Aldermen ===
Labour = Labour Representation League

Party	Candidate	Votes
**Independent**	**Matthew Esdale**	**4,199**
**Labour**	**James Kinney**	**4,190**
**Independent**	**Charles Wilson**	**4,000**
**Labour**	**Samuel McCoppen**	**3,578** (elected for one year
**Independent**	**Henri Martin**	**3,327** (elected for one year)
**Independent**	**Warren Prevey** (South Side)	**3,022**
**Independent**	**Orlando Bush** (South Side)	**2,921**
Labour	T. Scott	2,258
Labour	S. W. Field	2,068
Labour	J. E. White	1,791
Independent	S. Freeman	990
	Total	32,344

=== Public school trustees ===
Party	Candidate	Votes
**Independent**	**Henry Douglas**	**4,854**
**Independent**	**J. A. McPherson**	**3,815**
**Independent**	**Arthur Cushing**	**3,121**
**Independent**	**E. T. Bishop**	**2,894**
Labour	Alfred Farmilo	2,147
Independent	A. L. Marks	1,916
Independent	Joseph Clarke	1,502

=== Separate (Catholic) school trustees ===
Party	Candidate	Votes
**Independent**	**M. Kelly**	**497**
**Independent**	**F. A. French**	**490**
**Independent**	**Joseph Henri Picard**	**417**
**Independent**	**H. J. Roche**	**387**
Independent	Richard Crossland	178

=== Plebiscites ===
	Votes	%
**Are you in favour of the assessment of** **buildings and improvements at a percentage** **value not exceeding 25 percent?**
For	1,552	46.12%
**Against**	**1,813**	**53.88%**
**Are you in favour of a business assessment** **equal to the full amount of rental value** **of the premises wherein business is carried?**
**For**	**3,555**	**61.36%**
Against	2,239	38.64%
