= 1897 Edmonton municipal election =

Municipal election in Canada

The 1897 municipal election was held December 13, 1897. This was the last election to elect a full town council for a one-year term, as the 1898 election was conducted under a staggered system. The election was to elect the town council (consisting of a mayor and six aldermen, each elected for a one-year term), five trustees for the public school division and four trustees for the separate school division.

== Voter turnout ==
Voter turnout figures for the 1897 municipal election are no longer available.

== Results ==
(bold indicates elected, italics indicate incumbent)

=== Mayor ===
William S. Edmiston was acclaimed as mayor.

=== Aldermen ===
Election conducted using Plurality block voting, with each voter casting as many as six votes. Those elected were to serve one-year terms.

Elected

- **Kenneth McLeod** - 86
- **James Ross** - 80
- **Joseph Henri Picard** - 80
- **Thomas Hourston** - 75
- **Alfred Jackson** (A.E. Jackson) - 75
- **William Humberstone** - 74

Not elected

- Phillip Heiminck - 60
- J V E Carpenter - 58
- Joseph Gariépy - 57

=== Public school trustees ===
Thomas Bellamy, R J W Mathers, A G Randall, James Ross, and Hedley C. Taylor were elected. Detailed results are no longer available.

=== Separate (Catholic) school trustees ===
N D Beck, Sandy Larue, Antonio Prince, and Georges Roy were elected. Detailed results are no longer available.
