= 1900 Edmonton municipal election =

Municipal election in Alberta, Canada

The 1900 municipal election was held December 10, 1900 for the purpose of electing a mayor and three aldermen to sit on the Edmonton Town Council, as well as five public school trustees and four separate school trustees.

There were six aldermanic positions on the council at the time, but three of them were already filled. Robert Lee and Alfred Brown had both been elected for a two-year term in 1899, and were still in office. Colin Strang had also been elected for a two-year term, but had resigned; James Blowey had been appointed by council to fill his seat, and he was still in office.

== Voter turnout ==
212 voters voted out of 400 eligible voters, for a turnout of 53.0%.

== Results ==
(bold indicates elected, italics indicate incumbent)

=== Mayor ===
Kenneth W. MacKenzie was acclaimed as mayor.

=== Aldermen ===
- **William Thomas Henry** - 142
- **Joseph Morris** - 110
- **Henry Goodridge** - 109
- Joseph Gariépy
- Phillip Heiminck
- William Harold Clark
- Thomas Bellamy
- Hedley C. Taylor

Vote totals for defeated candidates for this election are no longer available. The vote count exceeded the number of people who voted because each voter could cast up to three votes under the Block Voting system.

=== Public school trustees ===
Thomas Bellamy, Matthew McCauley, William Short, Alex Taylor, and Hedley C. Taylor were elected. Detailed results are no longer available.

=== Separate (Catholic) school trustees ===
Nicolas Dubois Dominic Beck, Joseph Henri Picard, Antonio Prince, and Georges Roy were elected. Detailed results are no longer available.
