= Daniel R. Fraser =

Canadian politician (1851–1920)

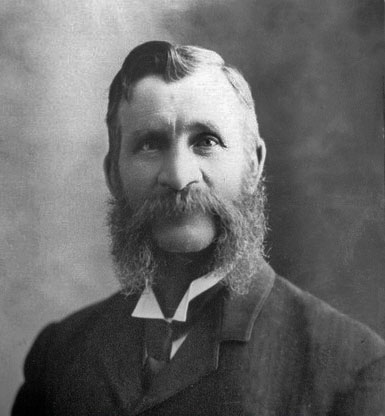

Alderman on the Edmonton Town Council
- In office February 10, 1892 – January 13, 1893
- In office December 14, 1896 – December 13, 1897
- In office December 8, 1902 – December 12, 1904

Alderman on the Edmonton City Council
- In office December 12, 1904 – December 11, 1905
- In office 1906 – December 13, 1909

Personal details
- Born: August 26, 1851 Edinburgh, Scotland
- Died: January 12, 1920 (aged 68) Edmonton, Alberta
- Spouse: Jane McCann
- Children: 4 children
- Profession: Businessman, Miller

Daniel Robert Fraser (August 26, 1851 – January 12, 1920) was a pioneer businessman and an alderman in Edmonton in the years 1897, 1903-1905 and 1908-1909.

== Biography ==
Daniel Fraser was born in Edinburgh, Scotland and emigrated to New York and then Canada as a child. He was educated in Huron County, Ontario. He apprenticed as a millwright, joiner, and carpenter before moving to Manitoba in 1874 to work for the Hudson's Bay Company and later McCauley & Jarvis. In 1880 he returned to the Hudson's Bay Company, for whom he built a saw and flour mill in Edmonton and a flour mill in Prince Albert, Saskatchewan.

He moved to Edmonton in 1881 and operated his own mill under the name D R Fraser & Company Limited before becoming President of Alberta Milling Co., which operated four flour mills, and later Edmonton Pressed Brick Co. He married Jane McCann in 1891; the couple had four children.

In February 1892, Fraser was elected as an alderman to Edmonton's inaugural Town Council, finishing second of fourteen candidates (the top six were elected). However, he was defeated in his 1893 re-election bid, finishing last of nine candidates. He returned to public office in 1896. Six aldermen were elected and he squeaked back into office by finishing sixth of nine candidates (three votes ahead of future mayor William Thomas Henry). He did not seek re-election in 1898, and removed himself from politics once again until 1902.

In 1902 Fraser was elected to a two year term on council. He received the most votes of any candidate in the aldermanic race.

Fraser sought re-election in 1904, the year of Edmonton's incorporation as a city rather than a town. The number of aldermen was increased from six to eight. In order to maintain the system of staggered two year aldermanic terms, it was decided that the four candidates receiving the most votes in the 1904 election would be elected to two year terms, while the next four in popularity would be elected to one year terms. Fraser finished seventh of seventeen candidates, and was therefore elected to a one-year term.

He was defeated in his 1905 bid for re-election, finishing eighth of ten candidates.

In December 1907, he ran for an aldermanic seat again but finished sixth - only five were elected.

In a byelection held just weeks after the December 1907 election, he was elected to fill a seat on council.

In 1908 he ran again and finished sixth of thirteen candidates. Since the electoral system at the time normally had four aldermen elected to two year terms each year, Fraser's sixth place showing normally would have been insufficient to be elected. However, two of the aldermen elected in 1907 (Robert Lee and Thomas Bellamy) had resigned in order to run for the mayor's chair, allowing Fraser and fifth-place finisher Andrew Agar to be elected to serve out the remaining one year of their terms.

Fraser did not seek re-election in 1909 and stayed out of politics thereafter.

He died in 1920.
