= David Latta =

David Latta may refer to:

- David Latta (politician) (1869–1948), politician from Alberta, Canada
- David Latta (ice hockey) (born 1967), Canadian ice hockey player
- David Latta (rugby union), New Zealand rugby union player
