= December 1896 Edmonton municipal election =

Municipal election in Alberta, Canada

The second of two 1896 municipal elections was held December 14, 1896. This was the first election to take place on the second Monday of December instead of the second Monday in January. The election was to elect the town council (consisting of a mayor and six aldermen, each elected for a one-year term), five trustees for the public school division and four trustees for the separate school division.

== Voter turnout ==
Voter turnout figures for the December 1896 municipal election are no longer available.

== Results ==
(bold indicates elected, italics indicate incumbent)

=== Mayor ===
John Alexander McDougall was acclaimed as mayor.

=== Aldermen ===
- **Kenneth McLeod** - 111
- **Joseph Gariépy** - 109
- **Thomas Hourston** - 105
- **Alfred Jackson** - 103
- **Cornelius Gallagher** - 96 (former mayor)
- **Daniel Fraser** - 90
- William Thomas Henry - 87
- Alfred Brown - 84
- Joseph Henri Picard - 84

=== Public school trustees ===
Thomas Bellamy, John Cameron, J Lauder, Matthew McCauley, and Hedley C. Taylor were elected. Detailed results are no longer available.

=== Separate (Catholic) school trustees ===
N D Beck, Sandy Larue, Antonio Prince, and Georges Roy were elected. Detailed results are no longer available.
