= Henry Goodridge (politician) =

Canadian politician

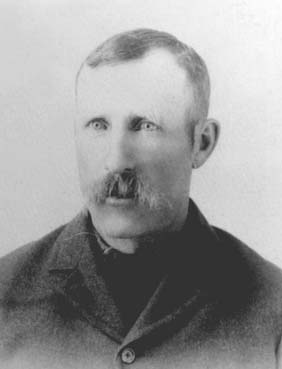

Alderman on the Edmonton Town Council
- In office 1899–1901
- In office December 9, 1901 – December 8, 1902

Personal details
- Born: October 26, 1849 Ontario, Canada
- Died: February 25, 1914 (aged 64) Sexsmith, Alberta, Canada
- Spouse: D. S. McKay
- Children: 6 sons

Henry Goodridge (October 26, 1849 – February 25, 1914) was a politician and municipal councillor in Edmonton, Alberta, Canada.

== Biography ==
Goodridge first came to Edmonton in 1874 with a troop of soldiers, visiting a settlement that had only recently started to expand beyond the confines of Fort Edmonton, near the present site of the Alberta Legislature Building.

Goodridge returned in 1876, becoming the first white settler in the area that is now the neighbourhoods of the former Town of Jasper Place, roughly 8 kilometres (5.0 miles) west of Fort Edmonton. When his fiancé, D. S. McKay, arrived some time later, they married and homesteaded a farm roughly 35 kilometres (22 miles) west of Fort Edmonton, near what is now Stony Plain. He later worked for a time in the implement trade. He and his wife would have six sons together.

In 1892, Edmonton was incorporated as a town. Sometime before 1899, Goodridge had moved into Edmonton, as he was appointed as an alderman to Edmonton Town Council that year to replace Kenneth W. MacKenzie, who had resigned to run for mayor. Goodridge was re-elected in the 1900 election, in which he placed third of eight candidates, but resigned in 1901. In the 1901 election, he was elected to complete the term to which he had originally been elected. He did not seek re-election at the conclusion of that term in 1902.

In 1908, Goodridge moved to Entwistle, Alberta to operate a lumber business. He retired in 1913, and died of a stroke February 25, 1914.

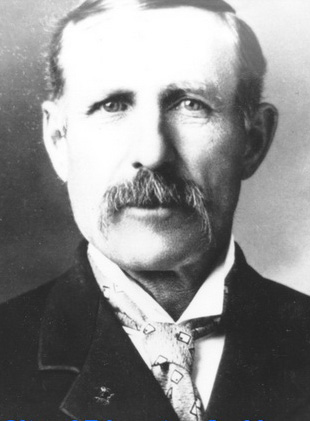
Goodridge in 1904
