= Gurney Evans =

Canadian politician

Edward Gurney Vaux Evans (September 3, 1907 – January 8, 1987) was a politician in Manitoba, Canada. He was a Progressive Conservative member of the Legislative Assembly of Manitoba from 1953 to 1969, and served as a cabinet minister in the governments of Dufferin Roblin and Walter Weir. His uncle, Harry Evans, was an Edmonton mayor.

He was born in Winnipeg, Manitoba, the son of William Sanford Evans, a Winnipeg mayor and Conservative MLA and party leader, and Irene Gurney, Evans was educated at Ridley College and the University of Manitoba, receiving a Bachelor of Arts degree. He became a publisher at his father's firm of Sanford Evans & Co. Ltd., and was assistant director of Ordnance Services in the Canadian Army from 1942 to 1946, reaching the rank of lieutenant colonel. He received the Order of the British Empire, and was a member of the Canadian Empire Club.

Evans served as executive director for the Carswell-Shaw Commission which assessed Manitoba flood damages in 1950 and was executive director of the Red River Valley Board following the 1950 flood. He was also chairman of the Manitoba Civil Service Commission.

Evans was a longtime friend of Dufferin Roblin, and was personally encouraged by Roblin to run for the provincial Progressive Conservatives. He was first elected to the Manitoba legislature in the 1953 provincial election, in the riding of Winnipeg South. This riding elected four members by preferential balloting; Evans finished fourth on the first ballot, was declared elected on the sixth and final count. In 1954, members of the Winnipeg Press Gallery unanimously endorsed him as the "most dignified man in the house" at their annual dinner.

He was re-elected in the 1958 provincial election, easily winning in the redistributed single-member constituency of Fort Rouge. The Progressive Conservatives formed a minority government after this election, and Evans was named Minister of Industry and Commerce and Minister of Mines and Natural Resources on June 30, 1958.

The PCs won a majority government in the 1959 election. Evans, easily returned, was relieved of the MNR portfolio on August 7, 1959, and named Provincial Secretary on December 21.

Evans was re-elected again in the provincial elections of 1962 and 1966. He stopped serving as Provincial Secretary on June 12, 1963. On July 22, 1966, was promoted from Industry and Commerce to the high-profile position of Provincial Treasurer and Minister of Mines and Natural Resources. Walter Weir retained Evans in these positions when he replaced Roblin as Premier in 1967. As Treasurer, Evans suggested separating capital from operating in the budget.

The Progressive Conservatives were defeated in the 1969 provincial election, and Evans lost his seat to Cy Gonick of the New Democratic Party by 273 votes in the redistributed riding of Crescentwood. He did not seek a return to provincial office after this time.
