= Thomas Hourston =

Canadian politician (1854–1905)

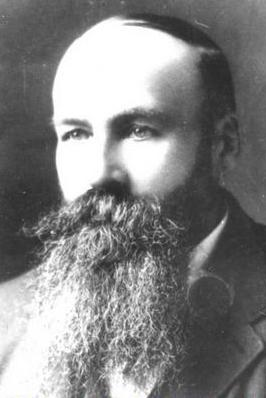

Alderman on the Edmonton Town Council
- In office December 14, 1896 – December 12, 1898

Personal details
- Born: February 12, 1854 Birsay, Orkney, Scotland
- Died: April 11, 1905 (aged 51) Guelph, Ontario
- Spouse: Maria Annal
- Children: 2 children
- Profession: Merchant, farmer

Thomas Hourston (February 12, 1854 – April 11, 1905) was a Scots-born pioneer businessman and politician in Alberta, Canada. He served as a town councillor in Edmonton 1897-1898.

== Biography ==
Hourston was born in Birsay, Orkney, Scotland and emigrated to Canada as a young man. He settled in Edmonton, at the time just a pioneer settlement. Once in Edmonton, he became manager of Norris & Carey, the store co-owned by Edward Carey. He and William Humberstone operated a brickyard in 1881. He later opened a fur store and started the area's first dairy farm.

In 1881 he married Maria Annal; they had two children, one of whom died in infancy.

In 1896 he was elected to Edmonton Town Council as an alderman, finishing fourth of nine candidates in an election in which the top six candidates were elected Plurality block voting. He was re-elected in 1897 and served until his term expired in 1898. He did not seek elected office thereafter.

Thomas Hourston died in Guelph, Ontario April 11, 1905. He is buried in Edmonton.
