= 1981 Edmonton municipal plebiscite =

Referendum in Edmonton, Alberta, Canada

On June 19, 1981, Edmonton voters were asked to vote on several plebiscite questions. Voters voted on three questions - a yes or no question on designation of the old city hall as a historic resource; a choice of three options for how to house city hall workers (plurality winner), and a two-part question on the ward system - first a yes or no question on wards, then if you voted in favor of wards, whether you wanted one-seat wards, two-seat wards or wards that had more than two seats. (Wards had been adopted in 1971 after a favorable vote in a plebiscite held in 1968.

Plebiscites held aside from the municipal elections were uncommon in Edmonton's history - the previous ones being held in 1918 and 1979.

== Background ==
During the fall of 1980, a group calling itself the Save City Hall Committee presented a petition to Cal McGonigle, Edmonton's City Clerk, asking that the City Hall be designated as a municipal historic building. McGonigle rejected the petition on the basis of insufficient signatures. This decision was overruled by the Court of Queen's Bench of Alberta in January 1981, and the petition was declared valid. McGonigle, acting independently of City Council, appealed the ruling on the basis that it could cause "ambiguity about the authority of all city clerks in Alberta in respect to legislation governing petitions."

Council gave first reading to the plebiscite on April 8, with the vote to be held May 10; this date was changed to June 19 when Council discovered that information on the design of the proposed new city hall would not be available in time for a May 10 plebiscite.

In addition to the question on which the Save City Hall Committee had sought a vote, council added two questions of its own, the first dealing with how the city should deal with the need for increased municipal office space and the second asking for the electorate's views on the ward system.

== Results ==
=== Designating City Hall as a Historical Building ===
Are you in favour of bylaw No. 6403, a bylaw to designate a building within the City of Edmonton and known as the "City Hall", a Municipal Historic Building to be preserved and used by the City?

- Yes - 21172
- No - 21867

=== Municipal Office Space ===
There are three basic options to house the Civic Government in the downtown area. These are listed below. Please choose one only.

a. Build a new City Hall on same site, according to the design selected in the recent Architectural Competition - 14126

b. Retain and renovate the present City Hall and construct an extension to use the space between 102A Avenue and the CN Tower to incorporate the theme of the design selected in the recent Architectural Competition - 19115

c. Retain the present City Hall and continue to lease office space as required - 11099

520 ballots were rejected.

=== Ward System ===
Before 1971, no wards divided the city electorate. City councillors were elected at large using plurality block voting, except for a period in the 1920s when single transferable voting was used. At-large districting means that if there were 32 candidates for seats on city council (other than mayor), all 38 names appeared on the ballot and use of block voting meant the 12 receiving the largest number of votes were elected, whether that number was a majority of votes cast or not. In 1971, four wards with three city councillors each were set up. Voters in each ward voted only for one, two or three of the candidates among those competing for the positions in that ward. In 1980, the number of wards was increased to six, with two city councillors each.

Are you in favour of the Ward System? (VOTE YES or NO ONLY)

- Yes - 35,711
- No - 7988

117 ballots were rejected.

If your answer is yes, do you favour one of the following? (Vote for one if you voted "Yes" above)

- Existing Ward Size - 17,383
- Smaller Wards - 14,315
- Larger Wards - 2502

There were 2853 ballots rejected.
