= William Sanford Evans =

Canadian politician

Member of the Manitoba Legislative Assembly for Winnipeg
- In office 1922–1936

22nd Mayor of Winnipeg
- In office 1909–1911
- Preceded by: James Henry Ashdown
- Succeeded by: Richard Deans Waugh

Personal details
- Born: December 18, 1869 Spencerville, Ontario
- Died: June 27, 1949 (aged 79) Winnipeg, Manitoba, Canada
- Party: Progressive Conservative Party of Manitoba
- Spouse: Mary Irene Gurney (m. 1900)
- Relations: Harry Marshall Erskine Evans (brother)
- Children: Gurney Evans
- Education: Victoria University; Columbia University
- Profession: publisher

William Sanford Evans (December 18, 1869 – June 27, 1949) was a Manitoba politician. Between 1933 and 1936, he was the leader of Manitoba's Conservative Party caucus.

Evans was born in Spencerville, Ontario, the son of Rev. J.S. Evans and Mary Jane Vaux. He was educated at the Collegiate Institute in Hamilton, Ontario, Victoria University and Columbia University. He subsequently moved to Manitoba.

Evans was active in the publishing industry of his new province, founding the Winnipeg Telegram and writing a book on Canadian Imperialism during the Second Boer War. In 1920, he co-founded a publishing firm specializing in grain industry news. He married Mary Irene Gurney, a noted pianist, in 1900.

Evans ran for the federal Conservatives in Winnipeg in 1904, but was defeated by Liberal David Bole. He was elected Mayor of Winnipeg in 1909, and served in that position until 1911.

Evans was first elected to the Manitoba legislature in 1922, leading the Conservative party list in Winnipeg (which elected ten MLAs through preferential balloting). He was re-elected in 1927 and 1932, topping the Winnipeg ballot on the latter occasion. Evans was chosen as Conservative party parliamentary leader following the resignation of Col. Fawcett Taylor in 1933. He did not run against Errick F. Willis for the party leadership in 1936 and did not run for reelection in the provincial election which followed.

In 1931, while still serving in the Manitoba legislature, Evans was appointed by British Columbia Premier Simon F. Tolmie to head a commission investigating that province's fruit-growing cooperatives. The commission's report recommended a return to open competition and was opposed by many within the industry.

He was president of the first Canadian Club, formed in Hamilton, and helped form the Canadian Club of Winnipeg, also serving as its president.

Evans continued to publish grain industry news following his retirement from parliament. He died in 1949.

Notably, Evans's brother Harry M.E. Evans served as Mayor of Edmonton, Alberta. As well, Evans's son Gurney Evans served as a cabinet minister in the governments of Dufferin Roblin and Walter Weir in Manitoba.
