= 1979 Edmonton municipal plebiscite =

Referendum in Edmonton, Alberta, Canada

On November 30, 1979 residents of Edmonton were asked whether they wished to repeal the municipal bylaw authorizing construction of a Trade and Convention Centre. This building is now known as the Edmonton Convention Centre. Construction of the centre was supported by the mayor, Cec Purves.

As the question was about repealing a bylaw that allowed the construction of a Convention Centre, those favouring construction were required to vote "no" on the ballot. In order to avoid confusion, the pro-Convention Centre campaign propagated the slogan "No means go".

A majority voted against rescinding the bylaw. The project went on to completion and opened in 1983.

Plebiscites held aside from the municipal elections were uncommon in Edmonton's history - the other ones being held in 1918 and 1981.

== Voter turnout ==
There were 81,832 ballots cast out of 300,000 eligible voters, for a voter turnout of 27.3%.

== Results ==
Are you in favour of the repealing of bylaw No. 5384, a bylaw authorizing the construction and maintenance of a Trade and Convention Centre?

- Yes – 29,491
- No – 51,611

There were 730 ballots rejected.
