= Irene Gurney =

Canadian pianist and clubwoman

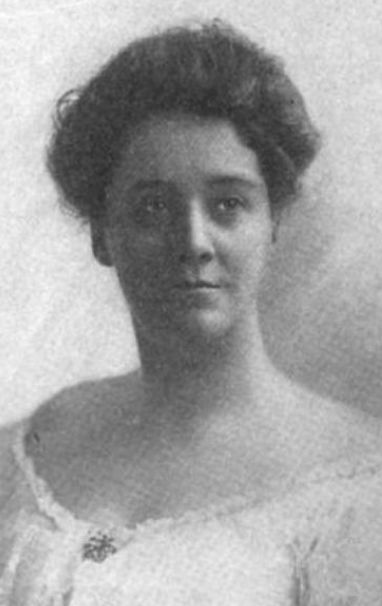
Irene Gurney Evans, from a 1908 publication

Mary Irene Gurney Evans (c. 1870 – August 29, 1951) was a pianist and clubwoman in Manitoba.

== Biography ==
Gurney was born in Toronto, the daughter of Edward Gurney and Mary Frances Cromwell, and was educated there and at the New England Conservatory of Music. She helped found the Women's Musical Club of Toronto and served as its vice-president. In 1900, she married William Sanford Evans and came to Winnipeg the following year. She was president of the Women's Musical Club of Winnipeg and was the first president of the Women's Canadian Club of Winnipeg. She died in Winnipeg in 1951.

Her son Gurney Evans served in the Manitoba legislature.
