= Samuel Hardman Smith =

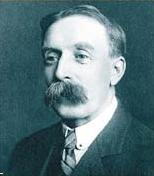

Alderman on the Edmonton City Council
- In office December 11, 1905 – December 9, 1907

Personal details
- Born: July 22, 1868 The Grange, Hethersett, Norfolk, England
- Died: February 21, 1956 (aged 92) Edmonton, Alberta, Canada
- Spouse: Florence White
- Profession: Farmer

Samuel Hardman Smith (July 22, 1868 – February 21, 1956) was a politician in Alberta, Canada, and a municipal councillor in Edmonton.

== Biography ==
Samuel Smith was born at The Grange, Hethersett, Norfolk, England, on July 22, 1868. His family moved to Iowa in 1880 to farm near LeMars, where Smith attended high school. Upon graduating, he farmed with his father until 1897 when he and his brother moved to Carberry, Manitoba. There, Smith farmed and later entered the real estate business.

He moved to Edmonton in 1901. He formed a real estate company - Western Realty Company, Ltd. - and had interests in coal mining and other businesses. He was vice president of Western Clays, Ltd. and of Sandeman & Cope Company, Ltd.

In the 1905 municipal election, he ran for alderman on Edmonton City Council. He placed third of ten candidates, and was one four candidates elected to a two-year term. He completed his term, but did not seek re-election at its expiration and did not re-enter politics thereafter.

In 1907 he married Florence White.

Samuel Smith was active with the Edmonton Club, the Anglican Church, and the Liberal Party.
