= Edmonton City Council =

Governing body in Alberta, Canada

Type
- Type: City Council of Edmonton

History
- Founded: October 8, 1904; 121 years ago (City); February 10, 1892; 134 years ago (Town)
- New session started: November 2025

Leadership
- Mayor of Edmonton: Andrew Knack, Independent since October 29, 2025

Structure
- Seats: 13 (12 Councillors+Mayor)
- Political groups: Independents (IND) (12) Better Edmonton (BE) (1)
- Committees: Boards, Commissions and Committees

Elections
- Voting system: FPTP
- Last election: October 20, 2025
- Next election: October 2029

Meeting place
- Edmonton City Hall

Website
- www.edmonton.ca

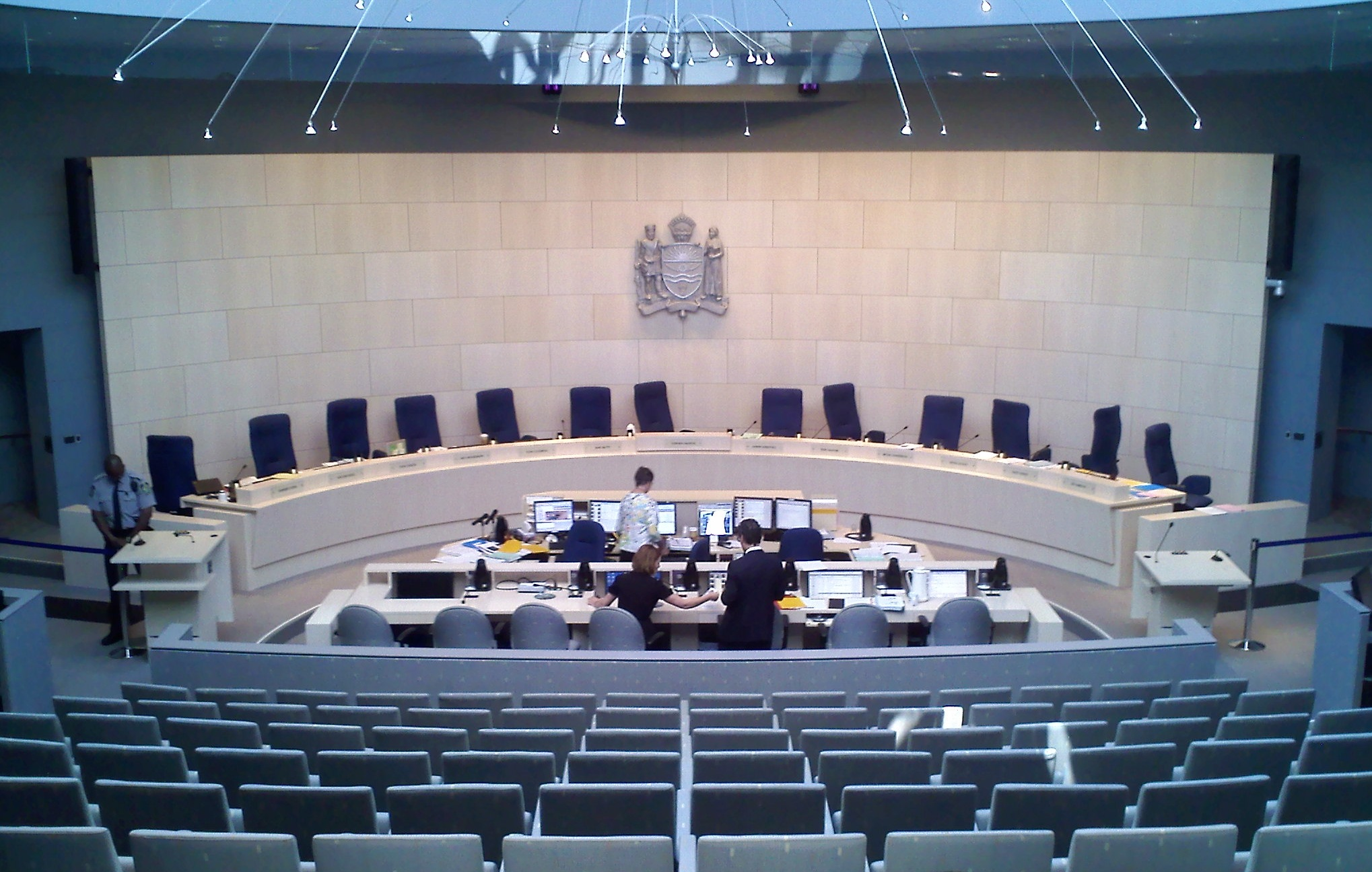
Council chambers at the Edmonton City Hall

Edmonton City Council is the governing body of the City of Edmonton, Alberta, Canada.

Edmonton currently has one mayor and twelve city councillors. Elections are held every four years. The most recent was held in 2025, and the next is in 2029. The mayor is elected across the whole city, through the First Past the Post plurality election system. Councillors are elected one per ward, a division of the city, also through the First Past the Post plurality election system.

On July 22, 2009, City Council voted to change from having six 2-seat wards to a system of 12 single-member wards. Each ward is represented by a single councillor. The changes took effect in the 2010 election. In the 2010 election, Edmonton was divided into 12 wards each electing one councillor.

Before 2010, the city at different times used a variety of electoral systems for the election of its councillors: at-large elections with Block Voting; at-large elections using Single Transferable Voting (when the mayor was elected through Alternative Voting; and two different systems of multi-member wards, using Block Voting system (when the mayor was elected through First past the post).

In May 2019, Edmonton's Ward Boundary Commission began reviewing the geographical boundaries of the city's wards. The final report was delivered on May 25, 2020. On December 7, 2020, Bylaw 19366 was passed which included the new geographical boundaries and new Indigenous ward names. The Indigenous ward names were determined by the Committee of Indigenous Matriarchs and came into effect on October 18, 2021, the date of the 2021 municipal election. The Committee of Indigenous Matriarchs, also referred to as the naming committee, was composed of 17 women representing communities from treaty territories 6, 7 and 8, along with Métis and Inuit representation.

Voters were given the opportunity to vote on specific laws and measures at various times in Edmonton's history, through holding of plebiscites. Also ratepayers (property owners) voted on money proposals in the early years.

== Councils ==
=== Since 2025 ===
In 2025, the city adopted municipal political parties.

Year Elected	Mayor	Ward Nakota Isga	Ward Anirniq	Ward tastawiyiniwak (ᑕᐢᑕᐃᐧᔨᓂᐊᐧᐠ)	Ward Dene	Ward O-day’min	Ward papastew	Ward sipiwiyiniwak	Ward Métis	Ward pihêsiwin	Ward Ipiihkoohkanipiaohtsi	Ward Karhiio	Ward Sspomitapi	Notes
2025	Andrew Knack (IND)	Reed Clarke (IND)	Erin Rutherford (IND)	Karen Principe (BE)	Aaron Paquette (IND)	Anne Stevenson (IND)	Michael Janz (IND)	Thu Parmar (IND)	Ashley Salvador (IND)	Michael Elliott (IND)	Jon Morgan (IND)	Keren Tang (IND)	Jo-Anne Wright (IND)	(Note: Reed Clarke and Michael Elliott ran under the Better Edmonton banner and were elected, but in November 2025, announced that they would be independent councillors.)

=== From 2021 until 2025 ===
In 2021, the twelve ward boundaries were modified and the wards were given indigenous names in place of numbers.

Year Elected	Mayor	Ward Nakota Isga	Ward Anirniq	Ward tastawiyiniwak (ᑕᐢᑕᐃᐧᔨᓂᐊᐧᐠ)	Ward Dene	Ward O-day’min	Ward papastew	Ward sipiwiyiniwak	Ward Métis	Ward pihêsiwin	Ward Ipiihkoohkanipiaohtsi	Ward Karhiio	Ward Sspomitapi	Notes
2021	Amarjeet Sohi	Andrew Knack	Erin Rutherford	Karen Principe	Aaron Paquette	Anne Stevenson	Michael Janz	Sarah Hamilton	Ashley Salvador	Tim Cartmell	Jennifer Rice	Keren Tang	Jo-Anne Wright	

=== From 2010 until 2021 ===
In 2010, Edmonton adopted a ward system in which one councillor was elected from each of twelve wards through first past the post. (This was the first time in the history of Edmonton that councillors were elected one by one through first past the post.)

The mayor was elected from the city at-large through first past the post.

In 2010, council was elected to serve three years. In 2013 and 2017 they were elected to serve for four years.

Year Elected	Mayor	Ward 1	Ward 2	Ward 3	Ward 4	Ward 5	Ward 6	Ward 7	Ward 8	Ward 9	Ward 10	Ward 11	Ward 12	Notes
2017	Don Iveson	Andrew Knack	Bev Esslinger	Jon Dziadyk	Aaron Paquette	Sarah Hamilton	Scott McKeen	Tony Caterina	Ben Henderson	Tim Cartmell	Michael Walters	Mike Nickel	Mohinder Banga	
2013	Don Iveson	Andrew Knack	Bev Esslinger	Dave Loken	Ed Gibbons	Michael Oshry	Scott McKeen	Tony Caterina	Ben Henderson	Bryan Anderson	Michael Walters	Mike Nickel	Amarjeet Sohi (2013–15); Mohinder Banga (2015)	
2010	Stephen Mandel	Linda Sloan	Kim Krushell	Dave Loken	Ed Gibbons	Karen Leibovici	Jane Batty	Tony Caterina	Ben Henderson	Bryan Anderson	Don Iveson	Kerry Diotte	Amarjeet Sohi	

=== From 1980 until 2010 ===
In 1980, Edmonton adopted a ward system in which two councillors (aldermen until 1995) were elected from each of six wards through Plurality block voting. These wards were more organic (based on natural boundaries and divisions within the city) than the previous four-ward system.

The mayor was elected at-large through first past the post. Those elected served for three years.

Year Elected	Mayor	Ward 1	Ward 2	Ward 3	Ward 4	Ward 5	Ward 6	Notes
2007	Stephen Mandel	Karen Leibovici, Linda Sloan	Ron Hayter, Kim Krushell	Tony Caterina, Ed Gibbons	Jane Batty, Ben Henderson	Bryan Anderson, Don Iveson	Amarjeet Sohi, Dave Thiele	
2004	Stephen Mandel	Karen Leibovici, Linda Sloan	Ron Hayter, Kim Krushell	Ed Gibbons, Janice Melnychuk	Jane Batty, Michael Phair	Bryan Anderson, Mike Nickel	Terry Cavanagh, Dave Thiele	
2001	Bill Smith	Karen Leibovici, Stephen Mandel	Allan Bolstad, Ron Hayter	Ed Gibbons, Janice Melnychuk	Jane Batty, Michael Phair	Bryan Anderson, Larry Langley	Terry Cavanagh, Dave Thiele	
1998	Bill Smith	Leroy Chahley, Wendy Kinsella	Allan Bolstad, Rose Rosenberger	Brian Mason, Robert Noce	Michael Phair, Jim Taylor	Bryan Anderson, Larry Langley	Terry Cavanagh, Dave Thiele	
1995	Bill Smith	Leroy Chahley, Wendy Kinsella	Allan Bolstad, Rose Rosenberger	Brian Mason, Robert Noce	Michael Phair, Jim Taylor	Larry Langley, Brent Maitson	Terry Cavanagh, Dick Mather	
1992	Jan Reimer	Bruce Campbell, Leroy Chahley	Allan Bolstad, Ron Hayter	Judy Bethel, Brian Mason	Michael Phair, Tooker Gomberg	Patricia MacKenzie, Lillian Staroszik	Terry Cavanagh, Sheila McKay	
1989	Jan Reimer	Bruce Campbell, Helen Paull	Catherine Chichak, Ron Hayter	Judy Bethel, Brian Mason	Mel Binder, Lance White	Patricia MacKenzie, Lillian Staroszik	Ken Kozak, Sheila McKay	
1986	Laurence Decore	Bruce Campbell, Helen Paull	Ron Hayter, Jan Reimer	Judy Bethel, Julian Kinisky	Mel Binder, Lance White	Patricia MacKenzie, Lillian Staroszik	Terry Cavanagh, Ken Kozak	
1983	Laurence Decore	Olivia Butti, G. Lyall Roper	Ron Hayter, Jan Reimer	Ed Ewasiuk, Julian Kinisky	Ed Leger, Lance White	Lillian Staroszik, Percy Wickman	Terry Cavanagh, Bettie Hewes	
1980	Cec Purves	Olivia Butti, Kenneth Newman	Ron Hayter, Jan Reimer	June Cavanagh, Ed Ewasiuk	Paul Norris, Gerry Wright	Lois Campbell, Percy Wickman	Bettie Hewes, Ed Leger	

=== From 1971 until 1980 ===
In 1971, Edmonton adopted a ward system in which three aldermen were elected from each of four wards through Plurality block voting. Each ward was a north–south slice of the city so each contained territories on both sides of the river.

Mayor was elected through first past the post.

Still the mayor and the councillors were to serve for three years.

Year Elected	Mayor	Ward 1	Ward 2	Ward 3	Ward 4	Notes
1977	Cec Purves	Lois Campbell, Kenneth Newman, Paul Norris	Olivia Butti, Gene Dub, Percy Wickman	Ron Hayter, Edward Kennedy, Ed Leger	William Chmiliar, Bettie Hewes, Buck Olsen	
1974	William Hawrelak	Robert Matheson, Kenneth Newman, Ches Tanner	Olivia Butti, Laurence Decore, David Leadbeater	Ron Hayter, Edward Kennedy, Ed Leger	Terry Cavanagh, Bettie Hewes, Buck Olsen	
1971	Ivor Dent	Dudley Menzies, Kenneth Newman, Ches Tanner	Alex Fallow, Cec Purves, David Ward	Ron Hayter, Ed Leger, William McLean	Terry Cavanagh, Una Evans, Buck Olsen	

=== 1968 ===
The 1968 Edmonton city election was different from the one before and the one after. Like the 1966 election the mayor and all the city councillors were up for election, councillors elected at large through Block Voting. Mayor elected through first past the post.

Unlike 1968 they were to serve for three years.

In 1968 Alberta's legislation had been changed to require elections every three years in all of the province's municipalities.

Year Elected	Mayor	Aldermen	Notes
1968	Ivor Dent	James Bateman, Neil Crawford, Una Evans, Julia Kiniski, Ed Leger, Kathleen McCallum, Kenneth Newman, Terry Nugent, Cec Purves, Ches Tanner, David Ward, Morris Weinlos	

=== From 1964 until 1966 ===
In 1964 two new aldermanic positions were added, bringing the total to twelve. As well Edmonton unstaggered its terms for city officials, meaning that all the council seats would be up for election each election, held every two years. In preparation for this, in 1964 the mayor and all aldermanic positions up for re-election were elected to one-year terms. All aldermen continued to be elected at-large through block voting, mayor through first past the post.

Year Elected	Mayor	Aldermen	Notes
1966	Vincent M. Dantzer	James Bateman, John Leslie Bodie, Neil Crawford, Ivor Dent, Reginald Easton, Frank Edwards, Una Evans, Julia Kiniski, Ed Leger, Angus McGugan, Cec Purves, Morris Weinlos	
1964	William Hawrelak	John Leslie Bodie, Vincent M. Dantzer, [vor Dent, Frank Edwards, Julia Kiniski, Robert Franklin Lambert, Ed Leger, Kathleen McCallum, Angus McGugan, Kenneth Newman, Morris Weinlos, Ethel Wilson	

=== From 1948 until 1963 ===
In 1948, the mayor began to be elected for a two-year term. the mayor was elected through first past the post.

Annual elections were still used to elect half the council each year through Plurality block voting at-large (no wards). The council continued to be elected at-large to staggered two-year terms until 1963, when the council seats up for election were filled just for one year (to prepare for the change in 1964 to all seats being up for election each election.

From 1912 to 1960, seats were guaranteed to southsiders. The guaranteed representation for the southside was cancelled after a 1960 referendum. (But in 1971 with the introduction of wards altogether south of the river, southside representation was re-established.)

Year Elected	Mayor	North side	South side	Notes
1963	William Hawrelak	John Leslie Bodie, Ivor Dent, Julia Kiniski, Ed Leger, Gordon McClary, McKim Ross		
1962		Vincent M. Dantzer, Frederick John Mitchell, Morris Weinlos, Ethel Wilson	George Prudham	
1961	Elmer Ernest Roper	John Leslie Bodie, Gordon McClary	Angus McGugan, Stanley Milner, McKim Ross	
1960		Milton Ezra Lazerte, Frederick John Mitchell, Morris Weinlos, Ethel Wilson	George Prudham	
1959	Elmer Ernest Roper	Ed Leger, Gordon McClary, McKim Ross	William Henning, Angus McGugan	
1958		Donald Bowen, Laurette Douglas, William Henning, Frederick John Mitchell, Ethel Wilson	George Prudham	
1957	William Hawrelak	William Connelly, Reginald Easton, J F Falconer	Hu Harries, Cliffard Roy	
1956		Donald Bowen, Laurette Douglas, Frederick John Mitchell, Ethel Wilson	Giffard Main	
1955	William Hawrelak	William Connelly, James Falconer, Abe Miller	Hu Harries, Cliffard Roy	
1954		Edwin Clarke, Laurette Douglas, Frederick John Mitchell, Ethel Wilson	Giffard Main	
1953	William Hawrelak	Rupert Clare, Abe Miller, Charles Simmonds	Hu Harries, Cliffard Roy, Harold Tanner	
1952		Edwin Clarke, Richmond Francis Hanna, Frederick John Mitchell, Ethel Wilson	James MacDonald	
1951	William Hawrelak	Rupert Clare, Violet Field, Al Larson, Abe Miller	Harold Tanner	
1950		Athelstan Bissett, Edwin Clarke, Richmond Francis Hanna, Frederick John Mitchell	Duncan Innes	
1949	Sidney Parsons	Rupert Clare, Edwin Clarke, Francis Ford, Kenneth Lawson	William Hawrelak, Harold Tanner	
1948		Sidney Bowcott, Richmond Francis Hanna, Frederick John Mitchell, Sidney Parsons	Athelstan Bissett	
1947	Harry Dean Ainlay	Francis Ford, Charles Gariepy, George Gleave	James McCrie Douglas, Harold Tanner	

=== From 1928 until 1947 ===
In this period, following a referendum in 1927, the city returned to using block voting to elect councillors at-large (in one city-wide district). Aldermen continued to be elected on staggered two-year terms.

The mayor was elected every year to a one-year term through first past the post.

There was still guaranteed minimum representation for the south side of the North Saskatchewan River. This number increased over time. It was two until 1936, and three thereafter, to 1960.

Year Elected	Mayor	North side	South side	Notes
1946	Harry Dean Ainlay (Civic Democratic Alliance)	Sidney Bowcott, Frederick John Mitchell, James Harwood Ogilvie, Sidney Parsons	Athelstan Bissett, Harold Tanner	
1945	Harry Dean Ainlay	James McCrie Douglas, Charles Gariepy, John Gillies, John Munro	Ethel Browne	
1944	John Wesley Fry	Sidney Bowcott, Frederick John Mitchell, James Harwood Ogilvie, Sidney Parsons	Athelstan Bissett	
1943	John Wesley Fry	Harry Dean Ainlay (CCF), Charles Gariepy, R W Hamilton	James McCrie Douglas, Melvin Downey	
1942	John Wesley Fry	Sidney Bowcott, Frederick John Mitchell, James Harwood Ogilvie, Sidney Parsons	Athelstan Bissett	
1941	John Wesley Fry	Gwendolen Clarke, Charles Gariepy, Guy Patterson	Harry Dean Ainlay, James McCrie Douglas	
1940	John Wesley Fry	Sidney Bowcott, Charles Gariepy, Frederick John Mitchell, James Harwood Ogilvie, Sidney Parsons	Athelstan Bissett, Blair Paterson	
1939	John Wesley Fry	Edward Brown, Frederick Casselman, Daniel Kennedy Knott	George Campbell, Douglas Grout	
1938	John Wesley Fry	Hugh Macdonald (Citizens Committee), Mack McColl (Citizens Committee), James Harwood Ogilvie (Citizens Committee), Sidney Parsons (Citizens Committee)	Blair Paterson (Citizens Committee)	
1937	John Wesley Fry	Edward Brown (Citizens Committee), Frederick Casselman(Citizens Committee), Daniel Kennedy Knott (Citizens Committee)	George Campbell (Citizens Committee), Douglas Grout (Citizens Committee), Blair Paterson (Citizens Committee)	
1936	Joseph Clarke	Hugh Macdonald, John McCreath, James Harwood Ogilvie	Athelstan Bissett, John Wesley Fry	
1935	Joseph Clarke (Civic Youth Association)	Walter Clevely (Civic Youth Association), Elisha East (Social Credit), Guy Patterson (Social Credit)	Margaret Crang (Labour), Charles Gould (Social Credit)	
1934	Joseph Clarke	James East (Labour), Dick Foote, John Wesley Fry, Hugh Macdonald, John McCreath	Athelstand Bissett	
1933	Daniel Kennedy Knott (Labour)	Ralph Bellamy, James Findlay (Labour)	Harry Dean Ainlay (Labour), Margaret Crang (Labour), Rice Sheppard (Labour)	
1932	Daniel Kennedy Knott (Labour)	James East (Labour), John Wesley Fry, Charles Gibbs (Labour), John McCreath, James Harwood Ogilvie		
1931	Daniel Kennedy Knott	Herbert Baker, James Findlay	Harry Dean Ainlay, Arthur Gainer, Rice Sheppard	
1930	James McCrie Douglas	James Collisson (Civic Government Association), Charles Gibbs (Labour Party), Frederick Keillor (Civic Government Association), Donald Lake (Civic Government Association), Charles Gerald O'Connor (Civic Government Association)		
1929	James McCrie Douglas	Herbert Baker, Ralph Bellamy, Daniel Kennedy Knott	Arthur Gainer, Rice Sheppard	
1928	Ambrose Bury	James Collisson, Alfred Farmilo, James Findlay, Charles Gibbs	Frederick Keillor, Rice Sheppard	

=== From 1923 until 1927 ===
In this period, following a successful referendum in 1922, the city used Single Transferable Voting, a form of proportional representation, to elect councillors. The effect was that no one party took all the seats up for election. Alternative Voting was used to elect mayors to ensure that the successful candidate had to have a majority of the votes to win. (No votes were transferred if one candidate took a majority on the first count such as is a certainty when only two candidates are in the running.)

The southside still had guaranteed representation, of at least two councillors.

The mayor continued to be elected annually, and aldermen continued to be elected to staggered two-year terms, with half up for election each year.

In 1927 a majority of voters voted to return to block voting to elect city councillors and first past the post to elect the mayor.

Year Elected	Mayor	North side	South side	Notes
1927	Ambrose Bury	Ralph Bellamy, John Bowen, James East (Labour), A C Sloane	L S C Dineen (Labour)	
1926	Ambrose Bury	Herbert Baker, Alfred Farmilo (Labour), Charles Gibbs (Labour), Charles Robson	L S C Dineen (Labour), George Hazlett	
1925	Kenneth Alexander Blatchford	James East (Labour), Alfred Farmilo (Labour), James Findlay (Labour), Charles Robson, A C Sloane	James McCrie Douglas, Frederick Keillor	
1924	Kenneth Alexander Blatchford	Joseph Clarke (Labour), James Collisson, Charles Gibbs (Labour), Daniel Kennedy Knott (Labour)	Will Werner	
1923	Kenneth Alexander Blatchford	Ambrose Bury, James McCrie Douglas, James East (Labour), James Findlay (Labour), William Rea	Joseph J. Duggan	

=== From 1912 until 1922 ===
As part of the amalgamation agreement between the cities of Edmonton and Strathcona south of the river in 1912, council was expanded to ten members and adopted guaranteed representation, of at least two seats, for the south side. (Wards were not established, but at least two southsiders had to be elected.)

The mayor continued to be elected annually through first past the post, and aldermen continued to be elected to staggered two-year terms, through Plurality block voting.

Izena Ross, elected in 1921, was the first woman to serve on council.

Political parties - the Labour Party and the business-oriented Citizens Committee - first appeared in civil elections. (Candidates had run on shared platforms even previous to that.) Parties were eventually written out of city elections in the 1980s and then re-emerged in 2025.

Year Elected	Mayoral term	Mayor	North side	South side	Notes
1922	1923	David Milwyn Duggan	Joseph Adair, Kenneth Alexander Blatchford, James Collisson, Daniel Kennedy Knott	Valentine Richards (1-year term), Rice Sheppard	
1921	1922	David Milwyn Duggan	Kenneth Alexander Blatchford (1-year term), Ambrose Bury, James East, Izena Ross (1-year term), Charles Weaver	Thomas Malone, Bickerton Pratt	
1920	1921	David Milwyn Duggan	Joseph Adair, James Collisson, W C McArthur, Andrew McLennan (all of the Citizens Committee)	Samuel McCoppen (Labour)(1-year term), Valentine Richards (Citizens Committee)	
1919	1920	Joseph Clarke (Labour)	Percy Abbott, James East (Labour), J. A. Kinney (Labour)	John Bowen, Rice Sheppard (Labour)	
1918	1919	Joseph Clarke	Charles Hepburn, Henri Martin, Samuel McCoppen (Labour), Andrew McLennan	Charles Grant, John J. McKenzie (Labour)	
1917	1918	Harry Marshall Erskine Evans	Matthew Esdale, J. A. Kinney, Henri Martin, Samuel McCoppen, Charles Wilson	Orlando Bush, Warren Prevey	
1916	1917	William Thomas Henry	Thomas Bellamy, J. A. Kinney, James Macfie MacDonald, William Martin, George Pheasey	Charles Grant	
1915	1916	William Thomas Henry	James Macfie MacDonald, W C McArthur, Charles Wilson	Orlando Bush, Robert Blyth Douglas	
1914	1915	William Thomas Henry	R N Frith, W C McArthur (1-year term), Joseph Henri Picard, James Ramsey, Samuel Williamson	Hugh Calder	
1913	1914	William McNamara	Alexander Campbell, Joseph Clarke, Robert Blyth Douglas	J. A. Kinney, Rice Sheppard	
Dec 1912	1913	William Short	Joseph Driscoll, James East, Gustave May, Harry Smith	Hugh Calder	
Feb 1912	1912	George S. Armstrong	Joseph Clarke, Henry Douglas, James East, Charles Gowan, John Lundy, Gustave May, Herman McInnes	Hugh Calder, John Tipton, Thomas J. Walsh	

=== From 1904 until 1911 ===
Edmonton was incorporated as a city in 1904. The size of council was set at eight alderman plus the mayor, with the mayor being elected annually through first past the post and the aldermen being elected at-large (no wards) on staggered two-year terms, with half the seats filled each year through Plurality block voting.

Year Elected	Mayor	Aldermen	Notes
1910	George S. Armstrong	Charles Gowan, Thomas Grindley, John Lundy, Herman McInnes, James McKinley	
1909	Robert Lee	George S. Armstrong, James Hyndman, John H. Millar, James Mould	
1908	John Alexander McDougall	Andrew Agar, Daniel Fraser, Wilfrid Gariépy, John Lundy, Herman McInnes, James McKinley	
1907	John Alexander McDougall	George S. Armstrong, Thomas Bellamy, Robert Lee, Robert Manson, Herman McInnes	
1906	William Antrobus Griesbach	Cameron Anderson, Thomas Daly, Wilfrid Gariépy, Morton MacAuley, James Walker	
1905	Charles May	William Antrobus Griesbach, Robert Manson, Joseph Henri Picard, Samuel Smith	
1904	Kenneth W. MacKenzie	Thomas Bellamy, John Boyle, William Clark, Daniel Fraser, William Antrobus Griesbach, Charles May, Kenneth McLeod, Joseph Henri Picard	

== Edmonton Town Council ==
=== From 1898 until 1904 ===
The Edmonton Town Council was the governing body of Edmonton, Northwest Territories, from 1892 until 1904, when Edmonton was incorporated as a city and the council became Edmonton City Council. Throughout its history it included a mayor and six aldermen.

The mayor was elected annually throughout the town's history, but beginning in 1898 they were elected to staggered two-year terms, with half of them elected each year.

Year Elected	Mayor	Aldermen	Notes
1903	William Short	Edmund Grierson, Charles May, Joseph Henri Picard	
1902	William Short	Arthur Cushing, Daniel Fraser, James Ross	
1901	William Short	Cornelius Gallagher, Henry Goodridge, Edmund Grierson, Phillip Heiminck	
1900	Kenneth W. MacKenzie	James Blowey, Henry Goodridge, William Thomas Henry, Joseph Morris	
1899	Kenneth W. MacKenzie	Alfred Brown, Henry Goodridge, Robert Lee, Colin Strang	
1898	William S. Edmiston	Alfred Brown, Alfred Jackson, Kenneth W. MacKenzie, Kenneth McLeod, Joseph Henri Picard, Richard Secord	

=== From 1892 until 1898 ===
The mayor and aldermen were elected annually from 1892 to 1898.

Year Elected	Mayor	Aldermen	Notes
1897	William S. Edmiston	Thomas Hourston, William Humberstone, Alfred Jackson, Kenneth McLeod, Joseph Henri Picard, James Ross	
Dec 1896	John Alexander McDougall	Daniel Fraser, Cornelius Gallagher, Joseph Gariépy, Thomas Hourston, Alfred Jackson, Kenneth McLeod	
Jan 1896	Herbert Charles Wilson	Thomas Bellamy, Isaac Cowie, William S. Edmiston, John Kelly, Matthew McCauley, Charles Sutter	
1895	Herbert Charles Wilson	Thomas Bellamy, John Cameron, William S. Edmiston, John Kelly, Joseph Henri Picard, Colin Strang	
1894	Matthew McCauley	Cornelius Gallagher, John Alexander McDougall, Joseph Henri Picard, James Ross, Colin Strang, Charles Sutter	
1893	Matthew McCauley	Cornelius Gallagher, James Goodridge, John Alexander McDougall, Kenneth McLeod, George Sanderson, Colin Strang	
1892	Matthew McCauley	John Cameron, Edward Carey, Philip Daly, Daniel Fraser, James Goodridge, Colin Strang	

== Plebiscites ==
Voter opinion was frequently polled in plebiscite questions held at time of elections. This happened in many cases including 1961, 1968, 1970 and 1974. Plebiscites held aside from the municipal elections were uncommon in Edmonton's history. The only ones were held in 1918, 1979 and 1981.

On March 4, 1918, a vote was held on the question of whether council was right in its hiring of an outside man to be fire chief, against wishes of the firefighters. The firefighters went on strike on the issue. A majority of city voters voted in favor of the firefighters' position; the final vote tallies being 6539 against the council's decision to 2250 in favour. The total turnout was larger than had been cast in the previous city election to fill the mayor's post.

In 1979, voters voted on cancelling a municipal law passed authorizing construction of a Trade and Convention Centre. Despite an adverse vote, the project was built and is now known as the Edmonton Convention Centre.

In 1981, voters voted on three questions - a yes or no question on designation of the old city hall as a historic resource (No won); a choice of three options for how to house city hall offices (retaining city hall to use for offices won), and a two-part question on the ward system - first a yes or no question on wards, then if you voted in favor of wards, whether you wanted one-seat wards, two-seat wards, or wards that had more than two seats (two-seat wards won). (Wards had been adopted in 1971 after a favorable vote in a plebiscite held in 1968. Two-seat wards were in effect until the 2010 Edmonton municipal election.)

As well, in the early years ratepayers (property owners) voted on money proposals alongside many municipal elections and at other times as well.
