= David Latta (politician) =

Canadian politician (1869–1948)

David Gilliland Latta
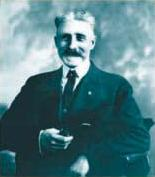

Alderman on the Edmonton City Council
- In office 1905 – December 10, 1906

Personal details
- Born: June 6, 1869 Ballycarny, County Wexford, Ireland
- Died: November 11, 1948 (aged 79) Edmonton, Alberta
- Spouses: Jessie Scott (m. 1896; died 1899) Emily Decoteau (m. 1900–1948)
- Profession: Blacksmith, farmer, carriagemaker

David Gilliland Latta (June 6, 1869 – November 11, 1948) was a politician in Alberta, Canada and a municipal councillor in Edmonton.

== Biography ==
David Latta was born June 6, 1869, in Ballycarny, County Wexford, Ireland. He was educated in nearby Enniscorthy, and came to Canada in 1889. He settled briefly in Ontario before moving to Whitemouth, Manitoba, where he joined the North-West Mounted Police in 1890. He was stationed near South Battleford, Saskatchewan, where he founded a sheep farm after being discharged in 1893. While there, he married Jessie Scott. In 1897 he sold the farm and moved to Edmonton, lured by the Klondike Gold Rush.

In Edmonton, he worked as a carriage maker for three years, during which time his wife died in childbirth. He remarried in 1899 to Emily Decoteau, sister of athlete and officer Alex Decoteau. In 1900 he established a blacksmith and carriage shop, which would become Latta and Lyons Company after he partnered with John H. Lyons in 1902.

In December 1905, Latta and Robert Mays were appointed to Edmonton City Council to complete the terms of Kenneth McLeod and Charles May, who had resigned. Latta served until the 1906 municipal election, in which he did not run, and did not return to politics thereafter, disillusioned by the bickering of his fellow council members.

In 1912, Latta's partnership with Lyons ended, as the latter left to found Lyons Motors Ltd. The old company continued business as D. G. Latta Ltd. It did well, and developed a specialty and shoeing racehorses to improve their speed. Latta shifted his focus to selling blacksmith supplies wholesale after many of his staff enlisted to fight in World War I. In 1918, Latta founded Belatta Collie Kennels; dogs from the kennel captured prizes at dog shows in Alberta and British Columbia.

In 1931, Latta retired and moved to Vancouver with his wife, leaving the business in the hands of his accountant. He suffered a stroke in January 1948, and returned to Edmonton where he died November 11. He was survived by his second wife, four daughters, and five sons.

In 1952, Latta Bridge in Edmonton was named in his honour.
