= 1916 Edmonton municipal election =

Municipal election in Alberta, Canada

The 1916 municipal election was held December 11, 1916 to elect a mayor and six aldermen to sit on Edmonton City Council, three trustees to sit on the public school board, and four trustees to sit on the separate school board.

There were ten aldermen on city council, but four of the positions were already filled: Orlando Bush, Robert Douglas, William Campbell McArthur, and Charles Wilson were all elected to two-year terms in 1915 and were still in office. James Macfie MacDonald was also elected to a two-year term in 1915, but resigned to run for mayor but then stood aside for Henry. He was elected to a two-year term and a less popular northside candidate, J. A. Kinney, was elected to a one year term to fill out his term. Kinney ran as a candidate for the Labour Party; all other candidates ran without any stated connection to a slate or party.

There were seven trustees on the public school board, while four of the positions were already filled: Walter Ramsey, Samuel Barnes, Henry Douglas, and J. A. McPherson had all been elected to two-year terms in 1915. There were also seven positions on the separate board, with three of them filled. Because one was vacant by reason of a resignation, O Derome was elected to a one-year term.

== Electoral System ==
The election of mayor was conducted by First past the post.

The election of aldermen was conducted through Plurality block voting, with each voter having ability to cast as many as six votes, no more than one per candidate.

== Voter turnout ==
There were 7745 ballots cast out of 11717 eligible voters, for a voter turnout of 66.1%.

== Results ==
- bold or ✓ indicates elected
- italics indicate incumbent
- "SS", where data is available, indicates representative for Edmonton's South Side, with a minimum South Side representation instituted after the city of Strathcona, south of the North Saskatchewan River, amalgamated into Edmonton on February 1, 1912.

=== Mayor ===
Party	Candidate	Votes	%
Independent	William Thomas Henry	6,186	79.88%
Independent	Joseph Clarke	1,558	20.12%

=== Aldermen ===
One Southsider had to be elected to a two year term.

The least popular candidate, otherwise, was elected to a one-year term.

Party	Candidate	Votes		Elected
Independent	Thomas Bellamy	4,219		✓
Independent	George Pheasey	4,126		✓
Independent	William Martin	3,837		✓
Independent	James Macfie MacDonald	3,730		✓
Labour	J. A. Kinney	3,666		✓
Independent	Joseph Henri Picard	3,617		
Independent	Charles Grant	3,345	SS	✓
Independent	James Collisson	2,686		
Independent	Andrew McLennan	2,535		
Independent	R. L. Carter	2,018		
Independent	P. D. McGrath	1,040		

Under the minimum South Side representation rule, Grant was elected instead of more popular Picard.

=== Public school trustees ===
Party	Candidate	Votes
Independent	William Rea	4,075
Independent	Joseph Duggan	2,665
Independent	Charles Frost	2,634
Independent	L. T. Barclay	2,258
Independent	D. H. MacKinnon	1,912
Independent	Samuel McCoppen	1,837
Independent	James Findlay	1,091
Independent	Charles Sandles	971

=== Separate (Catholic) school trustees ===
Party	Candidate	Votes
Independent	Joseph Gariépy	407
Independent	M. J. O'Farrell	400
Independent	G. W. Curtis	299
Independent	O. Derome	264
Independent	J. A. Trudeau	229
Independent	Richard Crossland	183
