= William Humberstone =

Canadian politician (1836–1922)

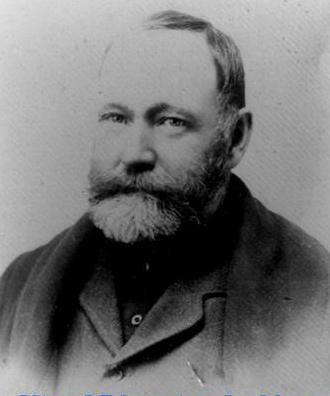

Alderman on the Edmonton Town Council
- In office December 13, 1897 – December 12, 1898

Personal details
- Born: October 20, 1836 Niagara Region, Ontario, Canada
- Died: April 2, 1922 (aged 85) Edmonton, Alberta, Canada
- Spouse: Beata Bader
- Profession: Prospector

William Humberstone (October 20, 1836 – April 2, 1922) was a Canadian businessman and politician. He was a municipal councillor in Edmonton, Alberta.

== Biography ==
Humberstone was born in Niagara Region, Ontario in 1836. He moved to Winnipeg, Manitoba in the 1870s, and in July 1880 left for Edmonton on foot with an ox and a Red River cart. He arrived three months later.

Soon after his arrival in Edmonton, he started a coal mine on the banks of the North Saskatchewan River (near today's Chinatown) and a brickyard in Riverdale, under the name Humberstone Brick & Coal Company.

He also went into partnership with John Walter to operate a sawmill, under the name Walter & Humberstone. This partnership ended in 1901.

He was elected to the Edmonton Town Council as an alderman in the 1897 municipal election, finishing sixth of nine candidates, (the election was conducted using Plurality block voting). He did not seek re-election at the conclusion of his term.

In 1899, he married Beata, a German immigrant. Not long after the wedding, flooding in the river washed away his mining infrastructure. They rebuilt the mine the following year, but two factors forced them to decide to move their mine's location—Edmonton had grown and continuing to mine so close in was discouraged; the river valley wall slumped severely in 1901.

They then operated a mine on the south bank. Then he and Beata bought land at today's Rundle Park. and started a mine there. By 1915, William was suffering from health issues and old age. Beata took over management of the mine, becoming one of the first women to run a large business in Edmonton. She continued to run the mine until 1934 when it closed due to lack of custom during he Great Depression.

He was also a hunter, killing a black bear in 1900 and bringing the cubs into Edmonton.

William Humberstone died in Edmonton on April 2, 1922.
