= James Blowey =

James T. Blowey
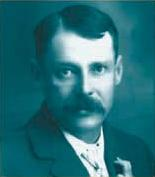

Alderman on the Edmonton Town Council
- In office 1900–1901

Personal details
- Born: March 21, 1853 England
- Died: August 1, 1934 (aged 81) Vancouver, British Columbia
- Profession: Businessman

James Thomas Blowey (March 21, 1853 – August 1, 1934) was a politician and municipal councillor in Edmonton, Alberta.

== Biography ==
Blowey was born in 1853 in England. When he was a child, his family immigrated to Canada and settled in Ontario. In 1878, Blowey moved to Old Nelson, Manitoba, and relocated to Edmonton in 1893.

In Edmonton, he started a furniture business. In 1900, he was appointed to the Edmonton Town Council to replace Colin Strang, who had resigned. He did not seek re-election at the conclusion of his term in 1901.

In 1906, he partnered with William Thomas Henry to form Blowey-Henry Ltd., furniture dealers. In 1915 Henry bought out Blowey, and the latter retired to Vancouver, British Columbia, where he died August 1, 1934. He was survived by two sons, Harry and Fresno.

James Blowey was a charter member of the Edmonton Club and the Edmonton Golf and Country Club, and was a longtime member of the Edmonton Board of Trade (now called the Edmonton Chamber of Commerce).
