= Thomas Grindley =

Canadian politician (1864–1929)

Thomas Maltby Grindley
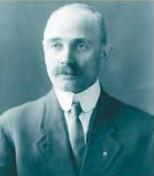

Alderman on the Edmonton City Council
- In office December 12, 1910 – February 1, 1912

Personal details
- Born: November 8, 1864 Laxey, Isle of Man
- Died: October 20, 1929 (aged 64) Vancouver, British Columbia
- Spouse: Mary Jane Furnivale
- Children: 2
- Profession: Soldier, merchant

Thomas Maltby Grindley (November 8, 1864 – October 20, 1929) was a politician in Alberta, Canada and a municipal councillor in Edmonton.

== Biography ==
Grindley was born November 8, 1864, in Laxey on the Isle of Man. He was educated there and immigrated to Canada in 1882. He moved to the country's west as a trading agent for the Chipman Brother of Halifax. He joined the military and took part in suppressing the North-West Rebellion in 1885, serving under Sam Steele.

In 1886, he left the Chipam Brothers and opened a general store in Fort Saskatchewan, where he also served as a school trustee. The following year, he became buyer and manager for Ross Brothers Hardware Company, co-owned by James Ross.

In 1888 he married Mary Jane Furnivale, with whom he had two children.

In 1903 he left the Ross Brothers to join the Revillon Brothers, where he remained until 1905 when he established Gorman, Clancey & Grindley, a mercantile house in Edmonton.

In the 1904 municipal election, Grindley ran for alderman on Edmonton City Council. He finished ninth of seventeen candidates, and was defeated. He was more successful in the 1910 election, when he finished second of eleven candidates and was elected to what was intended to be a two-year term. However, Edmonton's merger with Strathcona necessitated an entire new Council to be elected in February 1912, and Grindley's term was truncated. He was unsuccessful in his attempts to win it back, as he finished fourteenth of eighteen candidates.

While residing in Edmonton, Grindley built a large mansion, now known as the Grindley Suites, on 121 Street and 102 Ave. Although his ownership of the building was short lived, the building itself has a rich history, which includes housing the Edmonton Grads, an internationally successful women's basketball team.

Grindley was involved with the Anglican Church, the Freemasons, and the Liberal Party.
