= William Thomas Henry =

Canadian politician (1871–1952)

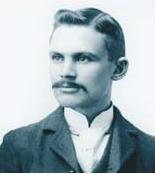

Alderman on the Edmonton Town Council
- In office December 10, 1900 – December 8, 1902

13th Mayor of Edmonton
- In office December 14, 1914 – December 10, 1917
- Preceded by: William McNamara
- Succeeded by: Harry Evans

Member of the Legislative Assembly of Alberta
- In office October 27, 1924 – June 28, 1926 Serving with John Bowen, Jeremiah Heffernan, Nellie McClung and Andrew McLennan
- Preceded by: John Boyle
- Succeeded by: John Lymburn, Charles Weaver, Charles Gibbs, Warren Prevey and David Duggan
- Constituency: Edmonton

Personal details
- Born: January 2, 1871 Prince Edward Island
- Died: March 12, 1952 (aged 81) Hollywood, California, U.S.
- Party: Alberta Liberal Party
- Spouse: Ada C. Battrick
- Children: 4 children
- Profession: Businessman, real estate agent and politician

William Thomas Henry (January 2, 1871 – March 12, 1952) was a politician, real estate agent and businessman in Alberta, Canada. He served numerous years on Edmonton City Council as an Alderman from 1900 to 1902 and later as mayor from 1914 to 1917. He also served as a member of the Legislative Assembly of Alberta from 1924 to 1926 sitting with the Liberal caucus.

== Early life ==
Henry was born in Prince Edward Island January 2, 1872. He moved to Calgary, Alberta, in 1890 and entered the dry goods business. Three years later, he moved to Edmonton and opened W. T. Henry and Co., Clothing, Boots and Shoes which outfitted parties going to the Klondike Gold Rush.

In 1903 Henry left the clothing business and went into real estate for three years before partnering with James Blowey to form Blowey, Henry Ltd., a wholesale and retail furniture company.

== Political career ==
=== Municipal ===
Henry sought election to the Edmonton Town Council as an alderman in 1896 but was defeated, finishing seventh of nine candidates.

Henry was more successful in his next second attempt to run for municipal council. He was elected to a two-year term as alderman in the 1900 election. He completed his term in 1902, but did not seek re-election.

The 1914 municipal election would see Henry return to municipal politics. He stood for Mayor and was elected handily defeating Joseph Adair in a landslide. Henry was returned by acclamation to mayoralty in the 1915 election.

The election held in 1916 would be contested. Henry easily defeated future mayor Joseph Clarke with another landslide majority. While mayor, Henry helped arrange for the acquisition of weapons by the Edmonton branch of the Legion of Frontiersmen for home defense during World War I, after his request to the army was turned down.

Mayor Henry did not seek re-election in the 1917 election, and turned his attention to provincial politics.

=== Provincial ===
Henry ran for a seat to the Alberta Legislature, seeking election as a Liberal candidate in the 1917 Alberta general election. He ran in the riding of West Edmonton but was defeated by Conservative incumbent Albert Ewing in a hotly contested two-way race.

Henry ran for his second time in a by-election held on in the Edmonton electoral district caused by John Boyle's appointment as a judge. Two years later he sought re-election in the 1926 election, but finished fifteenth of twenty-three candidates, he did not return to public office.

== Late life ==
Henry took his company Henry Ltd.'s out of the retail furniture business (in favour of wholesaling), Henry co-founded Henry, Graham and Reid in 1931. He also served as chairman of the Edmonton Hospital Board, and was a member of the Masonic Order, the Edmonton Board of Trade, the Methodist Church, and the Alberta College's first board. He played and refereed hockey. He was married to Ada C. Battrick, with whom he had four children.

Henry died March 12, 1952, in Hollywood, California, where he had travelled to for the winter. He was buried at the Edmonton Municipal Cemetery. Henry Avenue in Edmonton is named in his honour.
