= Harry Marshall Erskine Evans =

Canadian politician

H. M. E. Evans
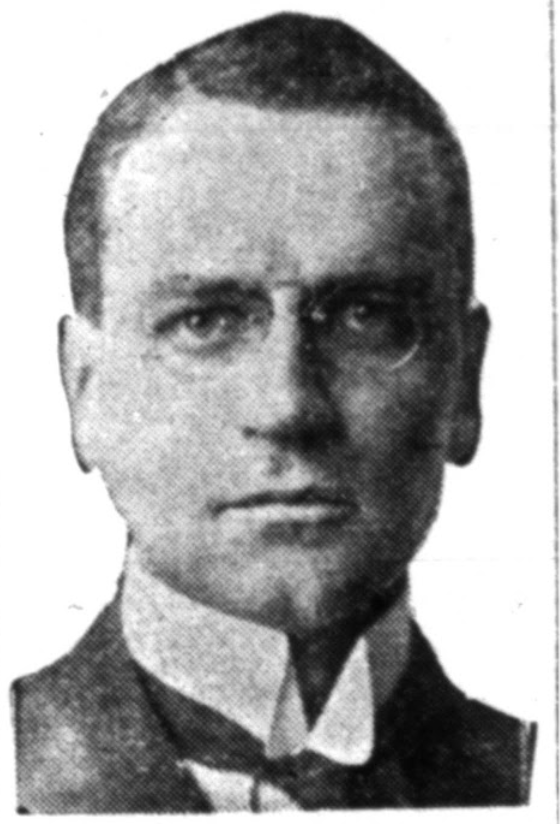

14th Mayor of Edmonton
- In office December 10, 1917 – December 9, 1918
- Preceded by: William Thomas Henry
- Succeeded by: Joseph Clarke

Personal details
- Born: August 17, 1876 Davenport (now part of Toronto), Ontario
- Died: September 20, 1973 (aged 97) Edmonton, Alberta
- Spouse: Edith Isabel Gifford Jackson
- Children: One son, four daughters
- Education: Michigan Technological University, University of Toronto
- Profession: Businessman, prospector

Henry Marshall Erskine Evans (August 17, 1876 – September 20, 1973) was a politician in Alberta, Canada, and successful businessman. He served as mayor of Edmonton in 1918.

== Biography ==
Harry Evans was born on August 17, 1876, in Davenport, Ontario, now part of Toronto, the son of Rev. J. S. Evans and Mary Jane Evans (née Vaux). He was educated in Hamilton before earning a Bachelor of Arts from the University of Toronto in 1897. After graduating, he attended the Michigan School of Mines in Houghton, Michigan.

He mined in Mexico for fifteen months before moving to Winnipeg where he was Business Manager for the Winnipeg Telegram (which had been founded by his brother William Sanford Evans, who went on to become mayor of Winnipeg and leader of the Conservative Party of Manitoba) from 1900 until 1904. After leaving the telegram, he worked for the Manitoba Land & Investment Company for two years.

Evans moved to Alberta in 1906 to prospect coal seams on the Pembina River. He moved to Edmonton the following year and managed the Pembina Coal Co. until 1908. He was the Canadian manager of a financial house in London, England, until it went bankrupt in 1912, when he founded the H. M. E. Evans Company, Ltd., which dealt in bonds, insurance, and real estate. In 1910, he married Edith Isabel Gifford Jackson, with whom he had one son and four daughters.

He was elected mayor in the 1917 municipal election, finishing first in a five candidate field. He did not seek re-election at the expiration of his one-year term. Immediately before his term as mayor, he was president of the Edmonton Board of Trade.

In 1925, he was appointed chairman of the Alberta Coal Commission. He served as a financial advisor to the Government of Alberta from 1931 until 1937. He was admitted to the Order of the British Empire on July 2, 1946, for meritorious service in war work.

Evans was involved with the Edmonton Rotary Club, the Manitoba Club, the Edmonton Board of Public Welfare, the Anglican Church, and the Conservative Party.

Harry Marshall Erskine Evans died in Edmonton September 20, 1973. Evansburg, Alberta, which he founded, and Evansdale, Edmonton, a neighbourhood, are named in his honour.

Notably, Evans's brother William Sanford Evans served as mayor of Winnipeg and leader of the Manitoba Conservative Party, and his nephew Gurney Evans was Minister of Finance amongst other portfolios in Manitoba. Evans's daughter Sylvia Evans was amongst the few women who served in the Royal Canadian Air Force during World War II.

== Notes ==
Preceded by William Thomas Henry	Mayor of Edmonton; 1917–1918	Succeeded by Joseph Clarke
