= Arthur Cushing =

Canadian politician (1869–1944)

Arthur Thompson Cushing
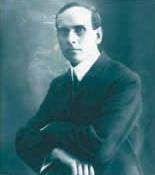

Alderman on the Edmonton Town Council
- In office December 8, 1902 – December 12, 1904

Personal details
- Born: February 10, 1869 Kenilworth, Ontario
- Died: March 26, 1944 (aged 75) Vancouver, British Columbia
- Spouse: Annie Nelson
- Children: 5 children
- Education: University of Toronto
- Profession: Businessman

Arthur Thompson Cushing (February 10, 1869 – March 26, 1944) was a politician in Alberta, Canada and a municipal councillor in Edmonton. His brother, William Henry Cushing, was a mayor of Calgary, while another brother, Alfred Cushing, served as alderman in that city.

== Biography ==
Cushing was born in Kenilworth, Ontario February 10, 1869. He was educated at Essec High School, and earned a B.A. from the University of Toronto in 1898. He moved to Edmonton in 1900 to manage his brother's lumber business. In 1902 he became manager of the Edmonton branch of Cushing Bros. Ltd., which he would manage until retiring in 1927. The same year, he married Annie Nelson, with whom he would have five children.

He first ran for office in the 1902 municipal election, when he finished third of five candidates in the race for alderman and was therefore one of three elected to the Edmonton Town Council for a two-year term. At the expiration of his term, at the 1904 election he chose to run for the public school board rather than seeking re-election as alderman. He was elected, and served for one year before running for mayor in the 1905 election. He was defeated by Charles May, and took a hiatus from politics.

He returned for the 1909 election, when he was again elected to the public school board, finishing first of seven candidates. He did not run for re-election at the conclusion of his two year term, devoting himself to the construction of a new factory in 1911. He was again elected to the board in the 1917 election, finishing third of seven candidates, but again declined to seek re-election after serving his two year term.

In the 1927 election, newly retired from his business, Arthur Cushing returned for a third and final stint as a school trustee. He was re-elected in the 1929 and 1931 elections. He did not seek re-election when his last term ended in 1933.

Cushing also served as the president of the Edmonton Board of Trade (now the Edmonton Chamber of Commerce) and the Edmonton Public Hospital. He died in Vancouver on March 26, 1944.
