= Phillip Heiminck =

Canadian politician (1849–1922)

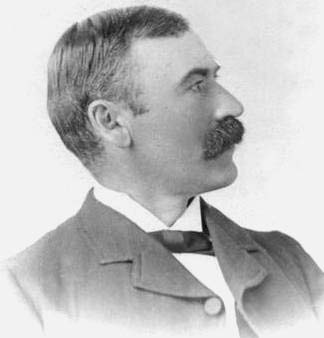

Alderman on the Edmonton Town Council
- In office December 9, 1901 – December 14, 1903

Personal details
- Born: May 17, 1849 Simcoe, Ontario
- Died: September 11, 1922 (aged 73) Edmonton, Alberta
- Profession: Real estate developer

Phillip Heimink (May 17, 1849 – September 11, 1922) was a politician in Alberta, Canada and a municipal councillor in Edmonton.

== Biography ==
Heiminck was born in Simcoe, Ontario, and moved to Winnipeg in 1870. There he married Isabella Green in 1873 and was involved in mercantilism before moving to Edmonton in 1881. In 1883 he moved to Fort Saskatchewan for ten years, returning to Edmonton in 1893. Upon his return, he engaged in real estate, building among other things the so-called "Heiminck Block" in downtown Edmonton.

He first ran for office in the 1897 municipal election, running for alderman on the Edmonton Town Council. He was defeated, finishing seventh of nine candidates in a race in which the top six were elected. He was similarly unsuccessful in the 1900 election, when he finished fifth among eight candidates; owing to Edmonton's newly staggered aldermanic terms only the top three candidates were elected in that election.

He was finally elected to a two-year term in the 1903 election. He did not seek re-election at its conclusion.

Phillip Heiminck died September 11, 1922. He was survived by his wife, one son, and two daughters.
