= Joseph Gariépy =

Canadian politician (1852–1927)

Joseph Hormidas Gariépy
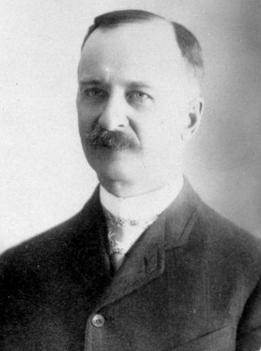

Alderman on the Edmonton Town Council
- In office December 14, 1896 – December 13, 1897

Personal details
- Born: December 3, 1852 L'Assomption County, Canada East
- Died: July 6, 1927 (aged 74) Edmonton, Alberta, Canada
- Spouse: Etudienne Boissonault
- Children: 7 children
- Profession: Merchant

Joseph Hormidas Gariépy (December 3, 1852 – July 6, 1927) was a politician in Alberta, Canada and a municipal councillor in Edmonton.

== Biography ==
Gariépy was born in L'Assomption County, Canada East on December 3, 1852. At age sixteen, he moved to Montreal where he lived for twenty-four years, working in the grocery business. He married Etudienne Boissoneault in 1872. The pair would have seven children; two of these, Wilfred and Charles, would enter politics themselves. In 1893 Joseph Gariépy moved to Edmonton bought a block of land for $1200 - the most expensive real estate traded in Edmonton to that date. On it, he opened a general store known successively as Gariépy & Chenier, Gariépy & Borsseau, and Gariépy & Lessard; a second store in Morinville followed in 1908.

Gariépy partnered with Prosper-Edmond Lessard, a former employee who would later become his son-in-law by marrying Emily Gariépy, both through his general store and through subsequent real estate ventures which saw both men become wealthy.

In 1896, Gariépy was elected as an alderman to Edmonton Town Council, finishing second of nine candidates in an election in which the top six candidates were elected. However, he was defeated in his 1897 re-election bid, finishing last of nine candidates. He attempted a comeback in 1900, and finished fourth of eight candidates. Unfortunately, aldermanic terms had, in the interim, become staggered, meaning that only half of the six seats were elected each year, so Gariépy was not elected.

He did not seek municipal office again during his lifetime, although he did sit as a Catholic school trustee between 1914 and 1924.

Gariépy was a founding member and president of the Edmonton Board of Trade, a member of the Knights of Columbus, and involved with the Liberal Party of Canada. He died July 6, 1927.
