= Thomas Bellamy (politician) =

Canadian politician (1853–1926)

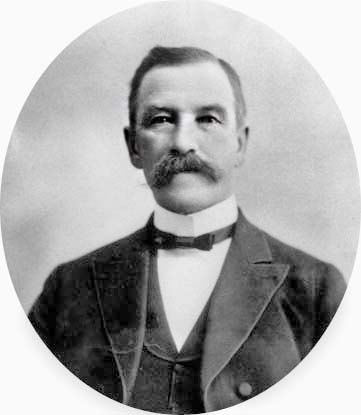

Alderman on the Edmonton Town Council
- In office January 14, 1895 – December 14, 1896

Alderman on the Edmonton City Council
- In office December 12, 1904 – December 10, 1906
- In office December 9, 1907 – December 14, 1908
- In office August 14, 1911 – February 16, 1912
- In office December 11, 1916 – December 10, 1917

Personal details
- Born: June 6, 1853 Durham County, Canada West
- Died: October 11, 1926 (aged 73) Edmonton, Alberta, Canada
- Party: Liberal
- Spouse: Lorinda Jane Davis (m. 1875)
- Children: 4
- Profession: Businessman

Thomas Bellamy (June 6, 1853 – October 11, 1926) was a politician in Alberta, Canada and a municipal councillor in Edmonton.

Bellamy was born at Canada West, which would later be the province of Ontario. The son of an English immigrant, he entered the woodworking industry after finishing school. After returning to farming briefly, he moved to Manitoba where established an agricultural product dealing business and later worked for the Massey Harris agricultural supply company. His employment with that company would bring him to Edmonton where he continued to work for them until he left to start his own business, the Bellamy Company, which manufactured agricultural products, establishing himself as a prominent Edmonton businessperson.

Involved with civic affairs upon his arrival in Edmonton, Bellamy would serve terms on the school board, and eventually city council, being first elected in 1895. He also would be elected to council again in 1904, 1907, 1911 and 1916. During his time on council, he was a supporter of municipal ownership. He also worked to change taxation policies to lessen the burden on the citizens of the city. He would stand as a candidate for mayor on three separate occasions, in 1906, 1908 and 1917, unsuccessful on each occasion. Upon his defeat in his final bid for mayor in 1917, he would retire from the civic politics scene.

Active in the masonic lodge and the Baptist Church, which he helped establish in Edmonton along with his wife, Bellamy would continue to reside in Edmonton up until his death in 1927 at the age of 73. Bellamy Hill in Edmonton's downtown core is named after him.

== Early life, career ==
Bellamy was born in Durham County, Canada West (later Ontario) in 1853, to George and Elizabeth (née Woolhouse) Bellamy. He was of English descent; his father was a farmer originally England, coming to Canada in 1830. Thomas Bellamy attended schools in his hometown, where he would also take a course in business. He then entered the carpentry/hardware industry, moving to Guelph, and later Bowmanville. In Bowmanville he apprenticed in a cabinet manufacturing business. After a short time there, he would later return to his family's farm in his birthplace as his "health became impaired". Bellamy farmed with his family until 1881, when he moved west to Portage la Prairie, Manitoba, where he established an agricultural supply business. He remained there until mid-1883, when he became an agent of an agricultural supply producer, A. Harris, Son, and Company, which prompted a move to Pilot Mound, Manitoba. He was transferred to Winnipeg in 1890, and lived there until he moved to Edmonton in 1892 where he selected a new office for the company, located on Howard and Jasper Avenue. In Edmonton, Bellamy remained with the company, now the newly amalgamated firm of the Massey Harris Company, until 1896.

He established the Bellamy Company, producers of agricultural products such as implements, wagons and carriages, in Edmonton in 1896. In addition, he sold seeds, also introducing lilacs to the city. He was also involved with the Edmonton Printing and Publishing Company. During his time in Edmonton he would establish himself as one of the city's most prominent businessmen.

== Civic politics ==
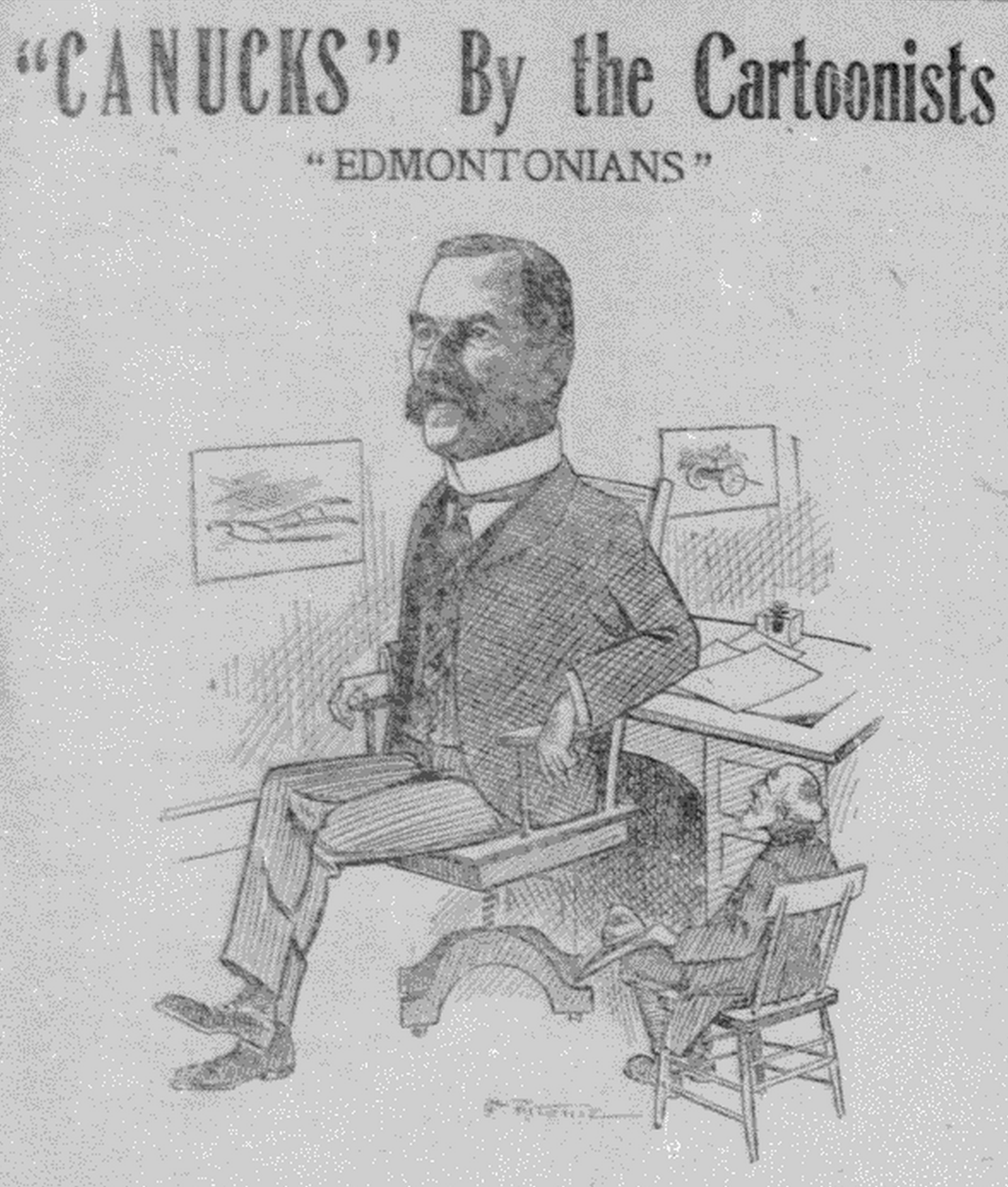
Cartoon of Bellamy in the Edmonton Bulletin, 1906

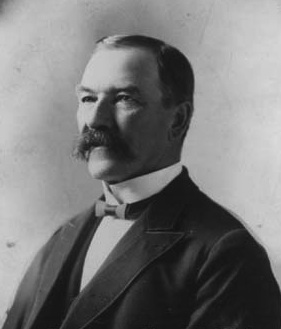
Bellamy in 1911

Bellamy was first involved in Edmonton politics when served on the public school board as a trustee in 1893. He would also later serve the board again from 1895 to 1896, 1898 to 1899, and a last time from 1901 to 1902.

He began his career in municipal politics in 1895 when he was elected to Edmonton Town Council as an alderman. He was re-elected in 1896, finishing third of eight candidates (the top six were elected), but did not seek re-election the following election. During these early years on the town council, Bellamy was a member of the council's finance committee.

He attempted to make a return to council in 1900, having been nominated by William Thomas Henry and Hedley C. Taylor, but lost, placing seventh of eight candidates (only three being elected).

His next effort, in 1904, was more successful, as he placed fourth of seventeen candidates and became one of four aldermen elected to a two-year term on Edmonton's first city council.

During this term, Bellamy served as the chairman of the council's finance committee and as a member of the streets and parks, as well as the police and licensing committees. During the term, notably, council discussed the issue of the firing of the city engineer, proposed by Alderman Robert Mays, who argued that he was "not onto his job". During the council vote, which required two thirds majority to pass, Bellamy exercised his vote in the capacity of alderman and acting mayor, giving him two votes, which defeated the motion. The defeat of the motion caused alderman John Robert Boyle, who had been in favour of it, to resign. During the 1906 term, Bellamy also voted in favour of an annual Edmonton Exhibition, the installation of a new incinerator for the city's waste, and a contract for a new sewage company, Canadian White, Co. of Montreal. The 1906 session also saw negotiations for the future High Level Bridge and Grand Trunk Pacific Railway. A supporter of municipal ownership, he was also a staunch opponent of the sale of the street rail system to a private company. Politically, he was a Liberal.

At the conclusion of this term, in the 1906 election, Bellamy made his first of three bids for mayor. During his campaign, he emphasized the city's need to build and expand the street rail system and the importance and possible expansion of the parks system. He also reaffirmed his previous support for municipal ownership, stating that it had helped Edmonton to become "one of the most advanced cities in Canada". His campaign was supported by the main city newspaper at the time, The Edmonton Bulletin, which stated their belief that the city was at a crucial developmental state which required many improvements to its facilities and utilities, and that "[Edmonton] needs the oldest seaman at the wheel", citing Bellamy's extensive experience in municipal affairs. He finished second of three candidates, being defeated by William Antrobus Griesbach, 717 to 301 votes. Later the next year, he returned to council as an alderman in the next election when he placed third of twelve candidates (five were being elected).

He resigned halfway through his two-year term to contest the mayoral race in 1908 election, after John Alexander McDougall said he would not run for re-election. He lost again, being defeated by Robert Lee.

Bellamy took a hiatus from politics, but when James McKinley resigned his seat in 1911 to protest the firing of two city commissioners, Bellamy, who declared his support for the firing of the commissioners, ran against him during the ensuing by-election and defeated him by 966 votes to 576. During this term, in late 1911, he served a stint as acting mayor of Edmonton. He did not seek re-election the following year. In the 1916 Edmonton municipal election, Bellamy initially announced intentions to once again run for mayor, but withdrew from the race when incumbent William Thomas Henry announced his plans to run for another term. He elected instead to run for alderman, returning for a final stint on council after the election, when he placed first of eleven aldermanic candidates, accumulating 4219 votes. This campaign he had focussed on the issue of taxation, proposing to lower taxes by postponing payments into a sinking fund, and to seek alternate methods of taxation. During the term, he would keep to his campaign promise and introduce a plan to council aimed at lowering taxes. Petitioned to do so, he once again resigned halfway through his two-year term to run for mayor. He ran again on a platform of reducing taxation, but finished fourth of five candidates in the election. He did not return to political life thereafter.

== Personal life ==
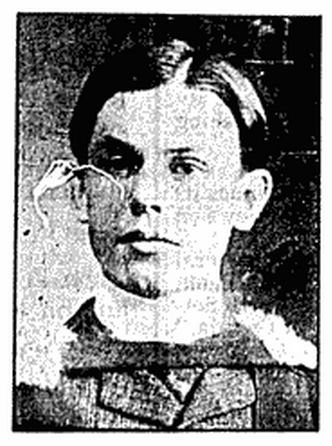
Ralph Bellamy, Alberta's first Rhodes Scholar

He married Lorinda Jane Davis, of Durham County, on January 1, 1875. The pair had three daughters and one son; Ralph Victor, Edith Elmira, Winnifred and Annie Evelyn. Alice Winnifred died while the Bellamys were living in Winnipeg, aged five years. Their son, Ralph Victor Bellamy was a Rhodes Scholar, the first ever in Alberta; he would also go on to become a school board trustee and city councillor in Edmonton himself. His wife, known as Lora, was active in the First Baptist Church, forming the first women's missionary society, the Edmonton YWCA, and Women's Christian Temperance Union.

Bellamy was a Mason, and served as lodge treasurer for twenty years. He had a reputation as an excellent ritualist. According to legend, this was because his business required him to travel extensively by horse and buggy. Bellamy would recite the rituals aloud on such journeys, and his horse eventually became so familiar with them that if Bellamy erred in reciting them, it would stop and refuse to proceed until he got it right. He was also active in the Edmonton Board of Trade, and the Edmonton Exhibition Association, serving on the latter's board of directors. Bellamy was also involved in the city's sporting scene, serving on a track committee playing on a curling team. Him and his wife would also be among the first Baptists in the Edmonton area; upon their arrival in Edmonton they organized the first meeting of other people in the city of that same religion.

== Death and legacy ==
Bellamy died of after recent years of declining health, at his Edmonton home on October 11, 1926. He was 73 years old. He was survived by his wife, whom he had celebrated his 50th wedding anniversary with one year prior, as well as their three children. After his funeral, which was overseen by the First Baptist Church and Masonic Order, he was buried at a family plot Edmonton Cemetery. Lora Bellamy died in 1937 and was buried next to him. A 1912 publication, History of the province of Alberta, praised his business career and, describing him as "a man of distinct and forceful individuality, [and] of broad mentality and mature judgement". In 1906, he was described as "unwaveringly faithful to the trust committed to him, and during his tenure of the office he so acceptably fills, has given city affairs his most careful and serviceable attention."

Bellamy Hill in, a road on a hill in Downtown Edmonton, the site of his former residence (99 Avenue and 102 Street), was named in his honour in 1973. The road is also situated near other roads named for other former council members, John Robert Boyle, William Harold Clark, Joseph Henri Picard and William Antrobus Griesbach.

== Bibliography ==
- Aubrey, Merrily K. (2004), Naming Edmonton: From Ada to Zoie, Edmonton, Alberta: University of Alberta, ISBN 978-0-88864-423-7
- Bellamy, Lora Davis (1925), Pioneer days of the first Baptist church in northern Alberta, Edmonton, Alberta
- Kostek, Michael A. (1992), A Century and Ten: History of Edmonton Public Schools, Edmonton, Alberta: Edmonton Public Schools, ISBN 9780969711902
- MacRae, Archibald Oswald (1912), History of the province of Alberta, vol. 2, Calgary, Alberta: Western Canada History Co
- Salesman Publishing Company (1906), Souvenir of Alberta: Being a general résumé of the province, with portraits, engravings and biographies of a number of men who have helped to build this great new province of the West, Winnipeg, Manitoba: Salesman Publishing Company
