= Kenneth McLeod =

Canadian politician (1858–1940)

Kenneth A. McLeod
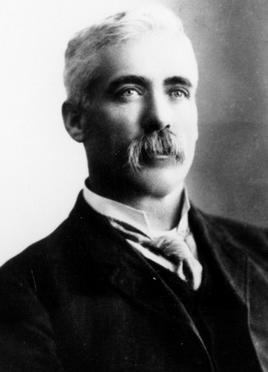
- Kenneth Archibald McLeod, builder of the McLeod Building, Edmonton's first skyscraper (completed 1915)

Alderman on the Edmonton Town Council
- In office January 3, 1893 – January 2, 1894
- In office December 14, 1896 – December 10, 1900

Alderman on the Edmonton City Council
- In office December 12, 1904 – 1905

Personal details
- Born: September 7, 1858 Port Elgin, Canada West
- Died: July 27, 1940 (aged 81) Vancouver, British Columbia
- Spouse(s): Anne Logar Lauder (d. 1927), Mary Belle McKinnon
- Children: 9
- Occupation: Builder

Kenneth Archibald McLeod (September 7, 1858 – July 27, 1940), was a politician in Alberta, Canada and a municipal councillor in Edmonton. He was also the builder of the McLeod Building, Edmonton's first skyscraper.

== Early life and career ==
McLeod was born September 7, 1858, in Port Elgin, Canada West. His family moved to Kansas in 1870 and homesteaded near Solomon three years before moving to Lynchburg, Virginia. McLeod worked with his father in the lumber and construction businesses.

In 1879, he moved to Winnipeg, where he stayed for two years before setting out for Edmonton August 5, 1881. His journey was on foot, in the company of two other men with three oxen, three Red River carts, a buckboard, and a pony. After ninety-one days of travel, he arrived in Edmonton November 3.

In Edmonton, he worked as a carpenter and builder until 1888. In 1893, he opened the first sash and door factory and planing mill in the city, which he operated for seven years before selling it in 1900. Also in 1893, he built Fire Hall No. 1, which served as home to the city's fire brigade, police department, town offices, and court house.

== Municipal politics ==
McLeod entered municipal politics in 1893 by running for alderman on the Edmonton Town Council. He was elected, finishing second of nine candidates in a race in which the top six were elected. He did not seek re-election in 1894, but returned to council in 1896, when he placed first of nine candidates for alderman. He was re-elected in 1897 (again placing first of nine candidates) and 1898, when he was one of three candidates elected to a two-year term as part of Edmonton's plans to stagger aldermanic terms.

He did not seek re-election when this term expired in 1900, but returned to municipal politics as part of Edmonton's first city council by running in the 1904 election. He finished third of seventeen candidates in this election (to fill eight seats). He was elected to a two-year term but resigned in 1905. He did not return to political life thereafter.

In addition to his municipal activities, McLeod sat on the public school board from 1901 until 1905.

== The McLeod Building ==
In 1912, McLeod announced the construction of the nine storey McLeod building, planned to be the tallest in the city. Modeled after Spokane's Polson Building, it was completed in 1915 at a cost of six hundred thousand dollars. It required twelve hundred tons of steel, primarily because McLeod insisted on building it with footings large enough for a fifty-storey building. It was the first building in Edmonton to be wired with conduits, and remains standing to this day.

== Family life and other interests ==
In 1894, McLeod married Anne Logar Lauder; the couple had nine children before she died in 1927.

McLeod was active with the Freemasons, the Edmonton Board of Trade, the Presbyterian Church, and the Liberal Party of Alberta. He was also a founding member of the Kony Island Sporting Company in 1894 at South Cooking Lake alongside William Short (Alberta politician), and Arthur Cushing.

In 1930 McLeod retired to Vancouver, British Columbia, where he remarried (to Mary Belle McKinnon). He died July 27, 1940.
