= Joseph Henri Picard =

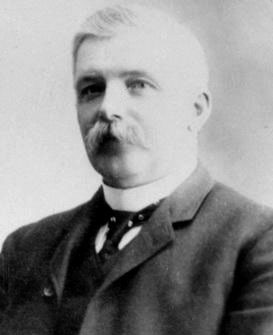

Alderman on the Edmonton Town Council
- In office January 2, 1894 – January 13, 1896
- In office December 13, 1897 – December 11, 1899
- In office December 14, 1903 – December 12, 1904

Alderman on the Edmonton City Council
- In office December 12, 1904 – December 9, 1907
- In office December 4, 1914 – December 11, 1916

Personal details
- Born: February 18, 1857 Saint-Jean-de-Matha, Quebec
- Died: May 23, 1934 (aged 77) Edmonton, Alberta, Canada
- Spouse: Martine Voyer
- Children: 2 sons
- Profession: Merchant

Joseph Henri Picard (February 18, 1857 – May 23, 1934) was a politician in Alberta, Canada and a municipal councillor in Edmonton.

Picard was born in Saint-Jean-de-Matha, Canada East, on February 18, 1857. He apprenticed as a carpenter before coming west in 1884 to Fort Qu'Appelle and then Regina. In Calgary, he met Father Albert Lacombe, who suggested to him that he move to Edmonton, which he did in 1887. Once in Edmonton, he opened a general store, Larue & Picard; it was sold in 1907 when both he and his partner retired.

In 1903, he married Martine Voyer. The couple had two sons.

His political career began in 1894 when he was elected as an alderman to Edmonton Town Council, finishing fifth of nine candidates in an election in which the top six were elected. He was re-elected in 1895, but defeated in 1896, placing seventh of eight candidates. He placed dead last of nine candidates in the following election, but returned to council in 1897, placing third of nine candidates.

In 1898, when staggered aldermanic terms were introduced, the top three finishers in the election were elected to two year terms, while the bottom three were elected to one year terms. Picard was one of the latter, and his term as alderman expired in December 1899.

He tried for election again in 1902, when he placed last of five candidates (three being elected).

He was elected in 1903, coming in third of nine candidates (three being elected to two year terms). However, this term was truncated when Edmonton became a city in 1904 and a new, eight member city council was needed to be elected.

In Edmonton's first city election, in 1904, Picard was elected to a one year term (the top four candidates won two year terms; the next four just one year terms). In 1905, he placed fourth of ten candidates and won a two year term.

At the expiration of this term in December 1907, Picard ran for mayor but was defeated by John Alexander McDougall. He stayed out of politics for seven years thereafter.

In 1914, Picard returned to office, finishing fourth of fourteen candidates. He and four others won two year terms. He was defeated in his 1916 re-election bid, finishing seventh of eleven candidates (six being elected). This marked the end of his career in municipal politics.

Joseph Henri Picard was a member of the Catholic school board from 1899 until 1925 and was also active with the Board of Trade, the Catholic Mutual Benefit Association, the Edmonton Club, the Edmonton Exhibition Board, l'Alliance Française, La Société Saint-Jean Baptiste, La Société du Parler Français, and the Liberal Party of Alberta.

Picard died May 23, 1934. École J. H. Picard School in Edmonton is named in his honour.
