= Alex Taylor (businessman) =

Canadian entrepreneur, inventor and politician

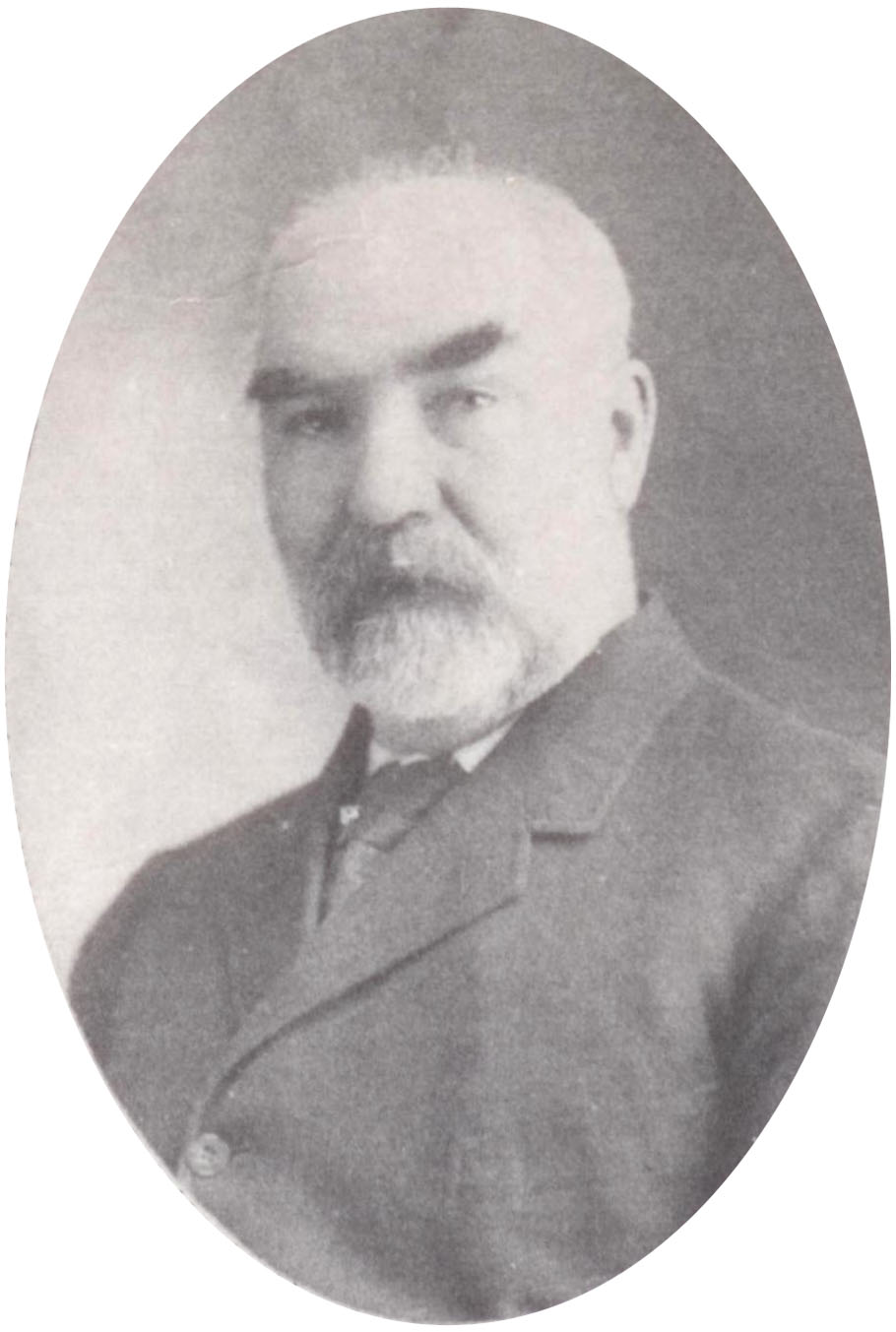
- Born: Alexander Taylor; May 17, 1853; Ottawa, Ontario, Canada
- Died: February 16, 1916 (aged 62); Edmonton, Alberta, Canada
- Occupations: telegrapher, meteorologist

Alexander Taylor (May 17, 1853 – February 12, 1916) was a Canadian entrepreneur, inventor and politician. A pioneer of early Alberta, he is credited as being one of the founders of the city of Edmonton. He established the first telephone and electricity systems in Edmonton.

Taylor was born in on May 17, 1853, in Ottawa, Canada West, and came to Edmonton in 1877. Shortly after his arrival in Edmonton, Taylor, worked as Dominion Telegraph Agent for the Dominion Telegraph and Signal Service.

Taylor and Frank Oliver co-founded Edmonton's first newspaper, the Edmonton Bulletin in 1880.

Taylor established the first telephone system in Edmonton. Taylor asked the Bell Telephone Company to provide services in 1883. When it refused to open operations in Edmonton, Taylor bought two telephones made of Spanish mahogany and began his own telephone operation. He asked store owner Henry William McKenney of St. Albert, Alberta to have one device and proposed running a telephone line from his telegraph office in Edmonton to McKenny's store. McKenny agreed, and on January 3, 1885, the two tested the line by making the first telephone call in Northern Alberta. In 1892, Taylor installed a switchboard. Jennie Lauder became Edmonton's first telephone operator, overseeing 14 telephones. In 1893, the Edmonton District Telephone Company was granted a charter, and less than a decade later it was operational 24 hours a day and provided service to nearby rural areas as well as the Town of Edmonton.

In 1891, Taylor co-founded Edmonton's first electric company, the Edmonton Electric Lighting and Power Company.

Taylor served on the Edmonton Public School Board from 1899 to 1909 and was the chairman of the board in 1907.

In 1904, ill health prompted Taylor to sell his telephone company to the City of Edmonton for $17,000. It later became known as Edmonton Telephones.

Taylor died on February 12, 1916. He is buried in the Edmonton Cemetery.
