= Hedley C. Taylor =

Canadian politician

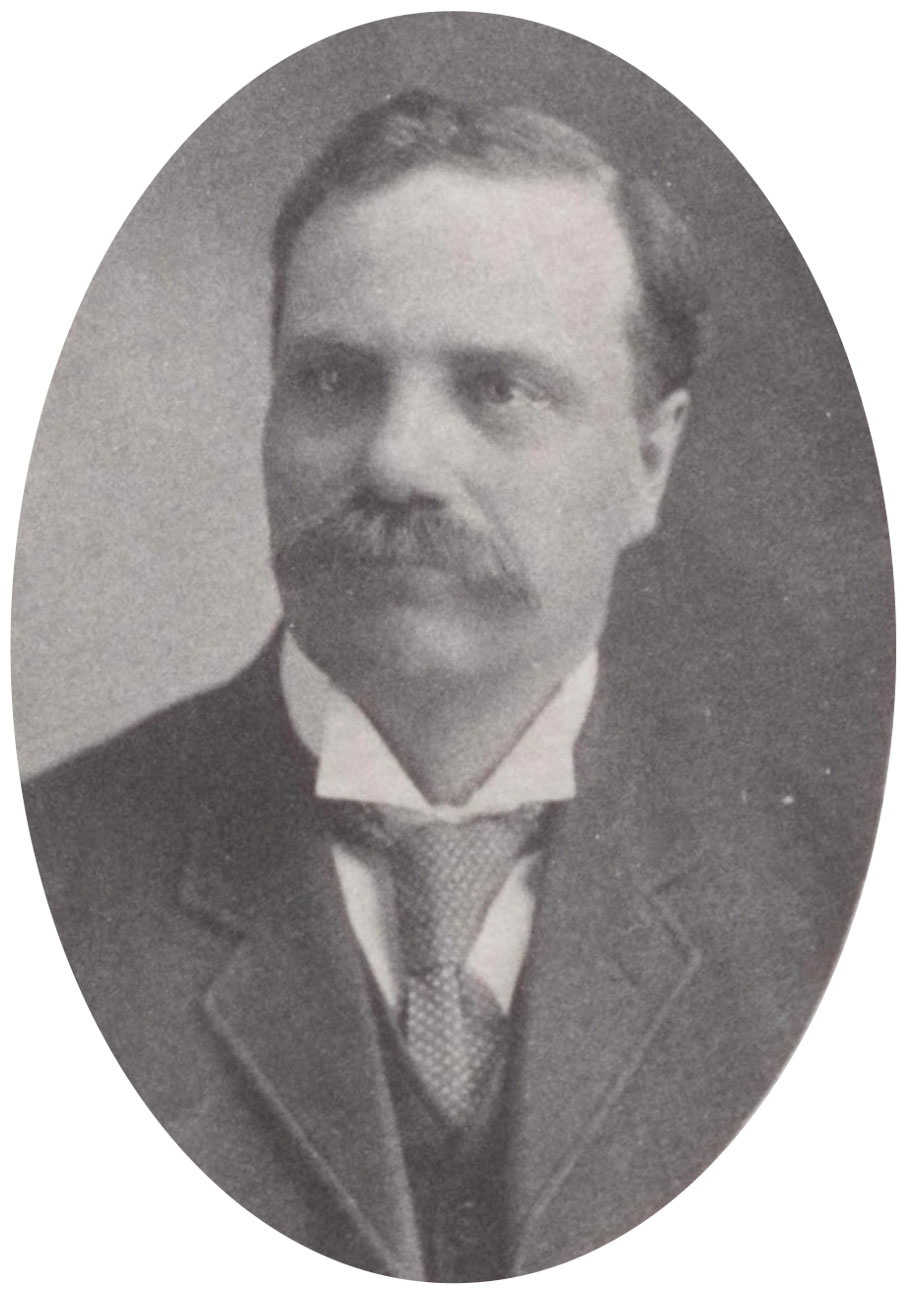

District Judge for Edmonton
- In office 1907–1931

Personal details
- Born: September 20, 1864; Sheffield, New Brunswick
- Died: February 23, 1931 (aged 66); Victoria, British Columbia
- Spouse: Bessie Taylor

Hedley Clarence Taylor (September 20, 1864 – February 23, 1931) was a Canadian politician and judge. Taylor was born in Sheffield, New Brunswick in 1864. He studied law at Mt. Alison University and the University of Michigan, in 1891. He partnered with John R. Boyle to form the firm of Taylor & Boyle, which later became Boyle, Parlee, Freeman, Abbott & Mustard. He served as a district judge for the city of Edmonton, ran unsuccessfully for alderman and mayor in several Edmonton municipal elections, and served multiple terms on the Edmonton Public School Board. He died in Victoria, British Columbia in 1931 of pneumonia.
