= John Lymburn =

Canadian politician (1926–1935)

John Lymburn QC
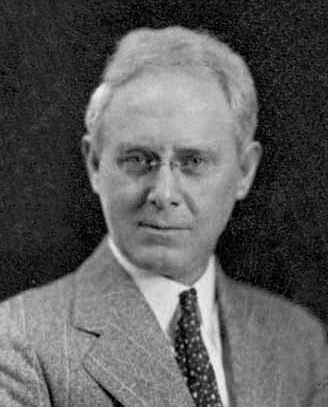

Member of the Legislative Assembly of Alberta
- In office June 28, 1926 – August 22, 1935 Serving with: David Duggan (1926–1935); Charles Gibbs (1926–1935); William Atkinson (1930–1935); William R. Howson (1930–1935); Frederick C. Jamieson (1931–1935); Charles Weaver (1926–1930); Warren Prevey (1926–1930)
- Preceded by: John Bowen; Jeremiah Heffernan; William Henry; Nellie McClung; Andrew McLennan
- Succeeded by: Samuel Barnes; David Duggan; William R. Howson; David Mullen; Charles Gerald O'Connor; George Van Allen
- Constituency: Edmonton

Attorney-General of Alberta
- In office June 5, 1926 – September 3, 1935
- Preceded by: John Edward Brownlee
- Succeeded by: John Hugill

Personal details
- Born: September 25, 1880 Ayr, Scotland
- Died: November 25, 1969 (aged 89) Edmonton, Alberta, Canada
- Party: United Farmers of Alberta (1926–mid-1930s)
- Spouse: Isabella Marguerite Clark (m. 1912; died 1958)
- Children: 3
- Education: University of Glasgow
- Occupation: Lawyer, Attorney-General of Alberta, and King's Counsel.

John Farquhar Lymburn QC (September 25, 1880 – November 25, 1969) was a Canadian politician who served as Attorney-General of Alberta from 1926 until 1935. Born and educated in Scotland, he came to Canada in 1911 and practised law in Edmonton (the capital of Alberta). In 1925, John Edward Brownlee became Premier of Alberta, and sought a lawyer without partisan affiliation to succeed him as attorney-general. Lymburn accepted the position, and was elected to the Legislative Assembly of Alberta in the 1926 election. As attorney-general, Lymburn took part in negotiations between the Alberta and federal governments over natural resource rights, prepared Alberta's submission in the Persons case, and played a minor role in the sex scandal that forced Brownlee from office. In the 1935 provincial election, Lymburn and all other United Farmers of Alberta candidates were defeated, as William Aberhart led the Social Credit League to victory. Lymburn made an unsuccessful attempt to return to the legislature in 1942, and briefly returned to prominence during the Bankers' Toadies incident, before dying in 1969.

== Early life ==
Lymburn was born in Ayr, Scotland, to William and Margaret (Farquhar) Lymburn. He attended Ayr Grammar School and Ayr Academy before studying law at Glasgow University. After graduating, he apprenticed with Dougall, Gouldie, and Douglas; he qualified as a solicitor in 1903. In 1911, he emigrated to Canada, settling in Edmonton, where he joined Short, Cross, and Biggar. Two years later, he co-founded Lymburn, Mackenzie, and Cooke (later renamed Lymburn, Reid, and Cobbledick). In the interim, he had married fellow Scot Isabella Marguerite Clark on July 19, 1912. The couple had three daughters: Marguerite Dormer, Mary Doreen Farquhar, and Constance Clark. John Lymburn was made a King's Counsel in 1926 (then automatically became Queen's Counsel in 1952 with the accession of Queen Elizabeth II).

== Attorney-general ==
In 1925, attorney-general John Edward Brownlee succeeded Herbert Greenfield as the leader of the United Farmers of Alberta (UFA)'s provincial caucus and Premier of Alberta. Brownlee was the only lawyer in the UFA caucus, which was dominated by farmers. In appointing an attorney-general to replace himself, he looked outside his caucus and appointed Lymburn, in part because of his lack of affiliation with any provincial political party. By convention, all cabinet ministers, including attorneys-general, were expected to sit in the Legislative Assembly of Alberta. Accordingly, Lymburn ran in the 1926 provincial election in Edmonton as a UFA candidate. He finished first of eighteen candidates in Edmonton, and became one of Edmonton's five members of the Legislative Assembly (MLAs). He was re-elected in 1930.

As attorney-general, Lymburn was involved in many of the Brownlee government's most important initiatives. He was a major figure in securing the transfer of resource rights from the federal government to the Alberta government. As the Great Depression bred labour militancy, at Brownlee's request he prepared a list of known Communist leaders so that the government could take action to deport them.

When Alberta became the only province to support the Famous Five, appellants in the Persons case, Lymburn was responsible for the province's submission.

He was also involved in scandal: the former head of the Liquor Investigation Bureau made allegations against him after Lymburn eliminated the Bureau to save money, though the charges had little effect either in the legal system or in the public eye. During the John Brownlee sex scandal, in which Brownlee was sued for the seduction of a family friend, Lymburn became the focus of controversy after his department hired a private investigator to look into claims that a Liberal lawyer had offered a young woman money to "put Mr. Brownlee in such a position that Mrs. Brownlee could get a divorce". Taking the stand during the trial, Lymburn stated that the investigation had been initiated not to aid in the premier's defence, but because the alleged solicitation was a criminal offence. He noted further that Brownlee had insisted on refunding to the government the cost of the investigator.

After the scandal forced Brownlee's resignation as premier, Lymburn stayed on as attorney-general in the short-lived government of Premier Richard Gavin Reid. The conservative Reid government was losing popularity as a result of the Great Depression. Radical economic theories, most notably the version of social credit espoused by Calgary evangelist William Aberhart, were gaining currency among the public. The government's position was that Aberhart's proposals were beyond the legal authority of the provincial government, since they involved banking, which the Constitution of Canada makes a responsibility of the federal government. As attorney-general, Lymburn played a major role in defending this position. When the government brought social credit founder C. H. Douglas from the United Kingdom as an advisor, Lymburn provided him with a copy of one of Aberhart's speeches and asked him to critique it; Douglas concluded that Aberhart's proposals did not align with "Douglasite" social credit, and that many of them would not have the desired effect.

== Later life ==
In the 1935 provincial election, the UFA was wiped out of the legislature by Aberhart's upstart Social Credit League. As historian Franklin Foster has noted, "it was an ironic footnote to the demise of the most politically successful farmers' group in history that the one UFA candidate who came closest to re-election was lawyer John Lymburn in the City of Edmonton." After defeat, Lymburn remained active in community life as an elder in Edmonton's First Presbyterian Church, chairman of the Advisory Board of the Students' Christian Movement, chairman of the board of directors of the Beulah Home for unmarried mothers, and president of the Edmonton Scottish Society. He was also a long-standing member of the Mayfair Golf and Country Club. He was an aficionado of the work of fellow Ayrshire native Robbie Burns, whose poetry he could recite in Gaelic, and often spoke at Burns suppers.

Lymburn briefly re-entered the public eye in 1937, when he was named in a Social Credit-produced pamphlet as one of eight "Bankers' Toadies" who should be "exterminated"; Social Credit whip Joseph Unwin was convicted of criminal libel in relation to the pamphlet. In 1942, Lymburn contested a by-election in Edmonton; he came in third of five candidates in the first round of counting. Elmer Roper of the Cooperative Commonwealth Federation emerged victorious.

Marguerite Lymburn died in 1958. John Lymburn died eleven years later, on November 25, 1969.

== Electoral record ==
1926 Alberta general election: Edmonton
Party	Candidate	Votes 1st count	%	Votes final count	Elected
United Farmers	John Lymburn	3,046	16.27%	3,026	✓
Conservative	Charles Yardley Weaver	2,202	11.76%	3,026	✓
Liberal	Warren Prevey	1,517	8.10%	2,940	✓
Independent Liberal	Joseph Clarke	1,179	6.30%	–	–
Liberal	John C. Bowen	1,147	6.13%	–	–
Independent	Samuel Barnes	1,060	5.66%	–	–
Labour	Alfred Farmilo	973	5.20%	–	–
Conservative	F. J. Folinsbee	881	4.71%	–	–
Labour	Charles Gibbs	879	4.70%	3,026	✓
Liberal	William Thomas Henry	858	4.58%	–	–
Conservative	David Duggan	857	4.58%	2,265	✓
Conservative	Herbert Crawford	782	4.18%	–	–
Labour	James W. Findlay	628	3.35%	–	–
Labour	Jan Lakeman	605	3.23%	–	–
Liberal	William Rae	561	3.00%	–	–
Labour	Elmer Roper	478	2.55%	–	–
Conservative	Mark W. Robertson	361	1.93%	–	–
Independent	John W. Leedy	140	0.75%	–	–
Total		18,154	–	–	–
Rejected, spoiled and declined		567	–	–	–
Eligible electors / turnout		33,741	55.48%	–	–
Source(s) Source: "Edmonton Official Results 1926 Alberta general election". Alberta Heritage Community Foundation. Election held under single transferable vote with a quota of 3,026 to elect five members to the Legislative Assembly.

1930 Alberta general election: Edmonton
Party	Candidate	Votes 1st count	%	Votes final count	Elected
United Farmers	John Lymburn	3,230	14.76%	3,028	✓
Conservative	David Duggan	2,665	12.18%	3,028	✓
Labour	Charles Gibbs	2,262	10.34%	3,028	✓
Conservative	Charles Weaver	2,013	9.20%	2,903	✓
Liberal	William R. Howson	1,835	8.39%	2,915	✓
Conservative	William Atkinson	1,786	8.16%	2,360	✓
Liberal	Warren Prevey	1,331	6.08%	–	–
Liberal	James Collisson	1,040	4.75%	–	–
Labour	Alfred Farmilo	832	3.80%	–	–
Labour	Samuel Barnes	818	3.74%	–	–
Independent	Jan Lakeman	752	3.44%	–	–
Labour	Daniel Kennedy Knott	745	3.41%	–	–
Conservative	N. C. Willson	451	2.06%	–	–
Liberal	G. V. Pelton	442	2.02%	–	–
Conservative	J. A. Buchanan	424	1.94%	–	–
Independent	Joseph Clarke	374	1.71%	–	–
Conservative	R. D. Tighe	189	0.86%	–	–
Total		21,189	–	–	–
Rejected, spoiled and declined		690	–	–	–
Eligible electors / turnout		39,209	55.80%	–	–
Source(s) Source: "Edmonton Official Results 1930 Alberta general election". Alberta Heritage Community Foundation. Election held under single transferable vote with a quota of 3,028 to elect six members to the Legislative Assembly.

1935 Alberta general election: Edmonton
Party	Candidate	Votes 1st count	%	Votes final count	Elected
Liberal	William Howson	9,139	24.52%	5,324	✓
Social Credit	Samuel A. Barnes	4,476	12.01%	5,324	✓
Social Credit	W. S. Hall	2,818	7.56%	–	–
Social Credit	David B. Mullen	2,500	6.71%	4,932	✓
United Farmers	John Farquhar Lymburnn	2,092	5.61%	–	–
Social Credit	Orvis A. Kennedy	1,781	4.78%	–	–
Conservative	David Milwyn Duggan	1,466	3.93%	5,078	✓
Liberal	George Van Allen	1,255	3.37%	5,324	✓
Social Credit	Mark W. Robertson	1,243	3.34%	–	–
Liberal	Marion Conroy	1,238	3.32%	–	–
Conservative	William Atkinson	1,220	3.27%	–	–
Liberal	Gerald O'Connor	1,116	2.99%	4,922	✓
Communist	Jan Lakeman	1,096	2.94%	–	–
Conservative	Frederick Jamieson	1,029	2.76%	–	–
Social Credit	G. L. King	843	2.26%	–	–
Liberal	J. C. M. Marshall	673	1.81%	–	–
Conservative	J. E. Basarab	671	1.80%	–	–
Liberal	Walter Morrish	612	1.64%	–	–
Labour	James East	505	1.36%	–	–
Conservative	Emily Fitzsimon	363	0.97%	–	–
Labour	James W. Findlay	331	0.89%	–	–
Economic Reconstruction	Elsie Wright	192	0.52%	–	–
Labour	Carl Berg	192	0.52%	–	–
Labour	Sidney Bowcott	166	0.45%	–	–
Labour	Alfred Farmilo	127	0.34%	–	–
Conservative	D. M. Ramsay	71	0.19%	–	–
Labour	Sidney Parsons	52	0.14%	–	–
Total		37,267	–	–	–
Rejected, spoiled and declined		785	–	–	–
Eligible electors / turnout		49,212	77.32%	–	–
Source(s) Source: "Edmonton Official Results 1935 Alberta general election". Alberta Heritage Community Foundation. Election held under single transferable vote to elect six members to the Legislative Assembly.

1942 by-election results (Edmonton)		Turnout N/A	
Co-operative Commonwealth	Elmer Roper	4,834	24.76%
Social Credit	G. B. Giles	4,432	22.70%
Independent	John Lymburn	4,032	20.65%
Soldier Representative	W. Griffin	3,389	17.36%
Liberal	N. V. Buchanan	2,838	14.53%

== See also ==
- Premiership of John Brownlee
