= 1935 Alberta general election =

8th general election

- August 22, 1935

63 seats in the Legislative Assembly of Alberta 32 seats were needed for a majority
- Turnout: 81.8%
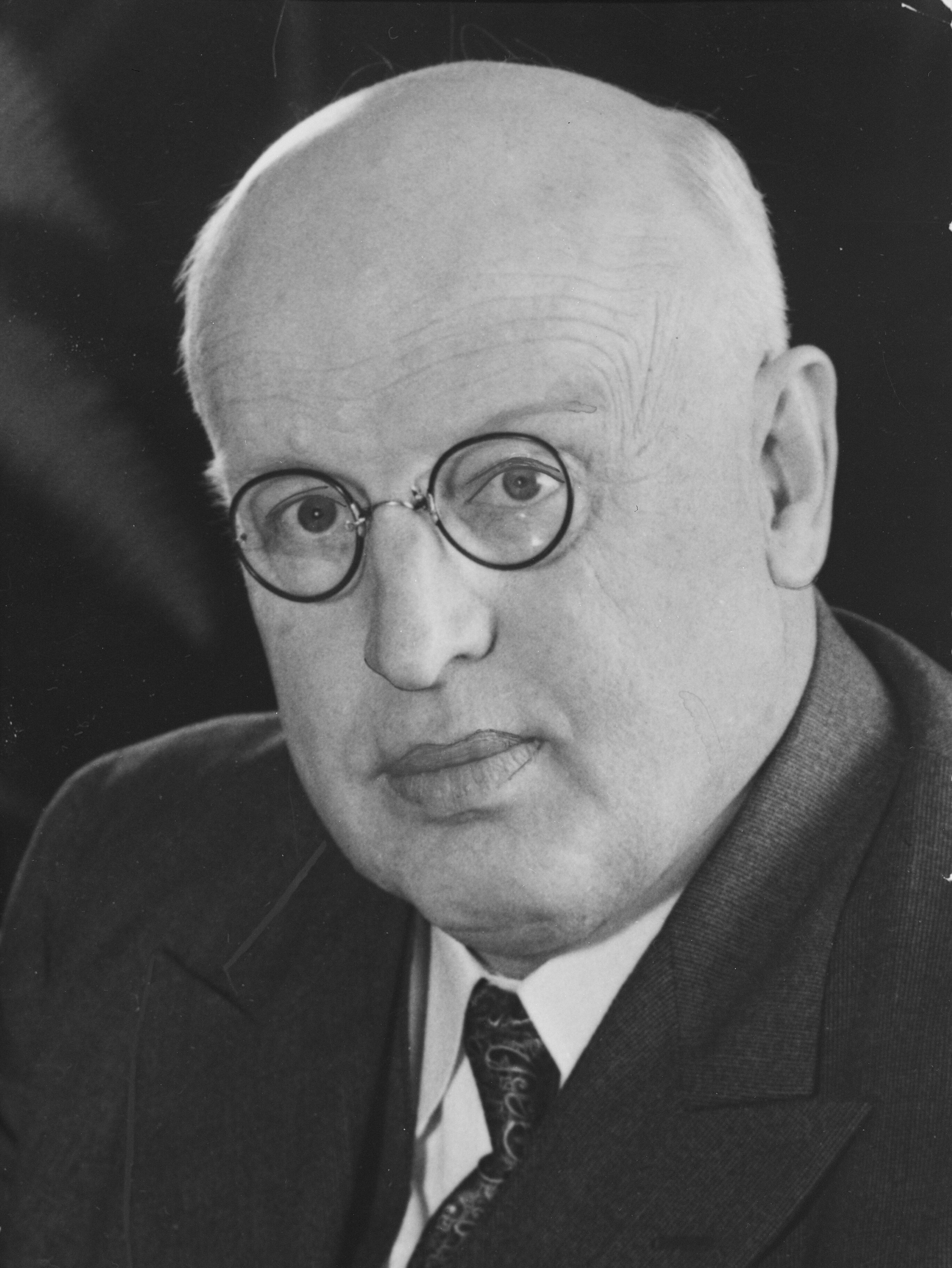

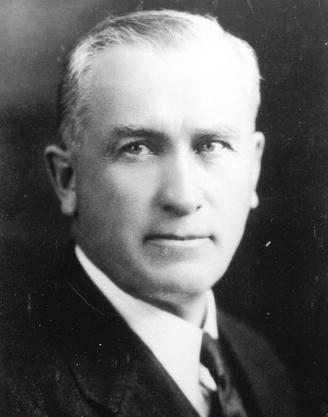

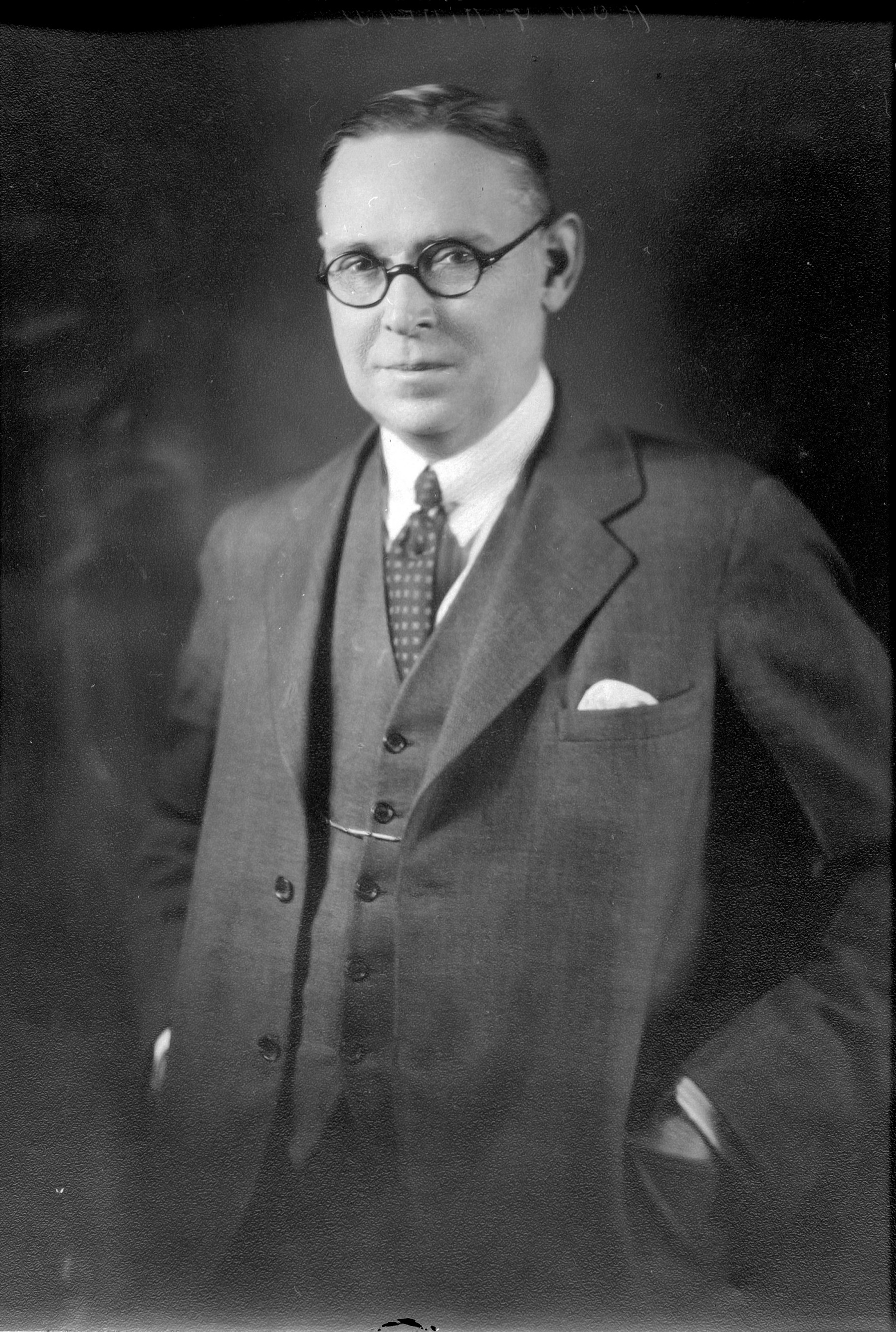

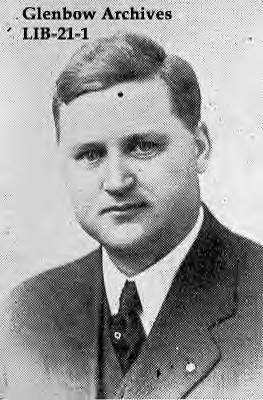
	Majority party	Minority party	Third party
		LIB
Leader	William Aberhart (de facto)	William R. Howson	David M. Duggan
Party	Social Credit	Liberal	Conservative
Leader since	September 3, 1935	October 21, 1932	1930
Leader's seat	Did not run	Edmonton	Edmonton
Last election	pre-creation	11 seats, 24.6%	6 seats, 14.8%
Seats before	0	13	6
Seats won	56	5	2
Seat change	▲56	▼8	▼4
Popular vote	163,700	69,845	19,358
Percentage	54.2%	23.1%	6.4%
Swing	—	▼1.5%	▼8.4%
	Fourth party	Fifth party
Leader	Richard G. Reid	Fred J. White
Party	United Farmers	Dominion Labor
Leader since	1934	between 1921 & 1926
Leader's seat	Vermilion (lost re-election)
Last election	39 seats, 39.4%	4 seats, 7.6%
Seats before	36	4
Seats won	0	0
Seat change	▼36	▼4
Popular vote	33,063	5,086
Percentage	11.0%	1.7%
Swing	▼28.4%	▼5.9%
Premier before election
Richard G. Reid
United Farmers
Premier after election
William Aberhart
Social Credit

The 1935 Alberta general election was held on August 22, 1935, to elect members of the 8th Alberta Legislature in the Legislative Assembly of Alberta. The newly founded Social Credit Party of Alberta won a sweeping victory, unseating the 14-year government of the United Farmers of Alberta. It was one of only five times that Alberta has changed governments.

Premier John E. Brownlee had resigned on July 10, 1934, when he was sued and found liable for the seduction of a young clerk working in the Attorney-General's office. Although the verdict was immediately set aside by the presiding judge, the scandal seriously damaged the UFA's reputation among socially conservative Albertans. Provincial Treasurer Richard G. Reid succeeded him, but was unable to change the party's fortunes. The government had fallen into disfavour as it had proven unable to address the Depression, which had hit Alberta particularly hard, and due to the government's unwillingness to accede to demands to adopt Social Credit policies and programs.

Social Credit won 56 of the 63 seats in the legislature, and over 50% of the popular vote, well beyond even the most optimistic Socred projections. Many of those gains came at the expense of the UFA, which lost all of its seats in one of the worst defeats ever suffered by a provincial government in Canada. Reid and Brownlee, for instance, were heavily defeated by Socred challengers, with Reid being pushed into third place. The UFA did receive 11 per cent of the vote so its due share was about ten members - the province's limited use of PR did not ensure that it won any seats at all.

The UFA's wipeout happened just a month after the Prince Edward Island Tories lost all 18 of their seats at that year's provincial election. A similar wipeout would not happen again until the 1987 New Brunswick general election, when the governing New Brunswick Tories lost all 39 of their seats.

The Alberta Liberals in this election ran with the tactically fatal slogan, the "rest of Canada can't be wrong"—referring to the popularity of the Liberal Party in the rest of the country. It did not work; they had their seat count cut in half. However, due to the UFA being swept from the legislature, the Liberals wound up as the Official Opposition. The Conservatives lost four of their six seats.

The Socreds' expectations for the election had been so low that they had not even named a formal leader for the campaign. When the newly elected Socred MLAs held their first caucus meeting, the first order of business was to select a leader and premier-designate. The obvious choice was the party's founder and guiding force, Calgary-based Baptist pastor William Aberhart. Persuaded to accept the mantle of leadership, Aberhart was sworn in as premier on September 3.

This provincial election, like the previous two, saw district-level proportional representation (Single transferable voting) used to elect the MLAs of Edmonton and Calgary. City-wide districts were used to elect multiple MLAs in the cities. All the other MLAs were elected in single-member districts through Instant-runoff voting.

The turnout of the 1935 election topped 80%, and no election in Alberta has come close to this mark.

This election campaign is seen as the most negative in Alberta's history, with reports of Social Credit members, operating openly and on Aberhart's directives, defacing the campaign signs of opponents and drowning their speeches by honking car horns. Many campaign ads also focused mostly on attacking the opposing parties.

After the 1935 election results were in, newspapers across North America took notice, with the Boston Herald running the headline "Alberta Goes Crazy!".

This shift marked the first in Social Credit's nine consecutive election victories, for a total of 36 years in office–one of the longest unbroken runs in government in the Commonwealth. The UFA never recovered from this wipeout defeat, withdrawing from politics altogether in 1937. Many of UFA's erstwhile supporters shifted to supporting the CCF, whose full name "CCF (Farmer-Labour-Socialist)" indicates how it was a merging of UFA and other previous farmer and labor parties.

== Results ==
Elections to the 8th Alberta Legislative Assembly (1935)
Party	Leader	Candidates	First-preference votes				Seats		
Party	Leader	Candidates	Votes	±	% Fpv	Change (pp)	1930	1935	±
Social Credit	William Aberhart	63	163,700	163,700▲	54.25	54.25	–	56 / 63	56▲
United Farmers	Richard G. Reid	45	33,063	41,124▲	11.00	-28.41	39	0 / 63	39▼
Liberal	William R. Howson	61	69,845	23,570▲	23.14	-1.45	11	5 / 63	6▼
Conservative	David M. Duggan	39	19,358	8,596▼	6.41	-8.44	6	2 / 63	4▼
Dominion Labor	Fred J. White	11	5,086	9,268▼	1.68	-5.95	4	0 / 63	4▼
Independent		7	2,740	20,526▼	0.90	-11.46	3	0 / 63	3▼
Communist	Jan Lakeman	9	5,771	3,588▲	1.91	0.75			
Independent Liberal		1	955	955▲	0.31				
United Front		1	560	560▲	0.19				
Independent Conservative		1	258	258▲	0.08				
Independent Labour		1	224	224▲	0.07				
Reconstruction		1	192	192▲	0.06				
Total		240	301,752		100.00%				
Rejected ballots			8,269	562▲					
Turnout			310,021	114,095▲	81.8%	15.1▲			
Registered voters			378,249	84,454▲					

== MLAs elected ==
Acadia: Norman James
Alexandra: Selmer Berg
Athabasca: Clarence Tade
Beaver River: Lucien Maynard
Bow Valley: Wilson Cain
Calgary: Fred Anderson
Calgary: John J. Bowlen
Calgary: Edith Gostick
Calgary: John Hugill
Calgary: John Irwin
Calgary: Ernest Manning
Camrose: William Chant
Cardston: Nathan Eldon Tanner
Clover Bar: Floyd Baker
Cochrane: William King
Coronation: Glenville MacLachlan
Cypress: August Flamme
Didsbury: Edward P. Foster
Drumheller: Herbert Ingrey
Edmonton: Samuel Barnes
Edmonton: David Milwyn Duggan
Edmonton: William Howson
Edmonton: David Mullen
Edmonton: Gerald O'Connor
Edmonton: George Van Allen
Edson: Joseph Unwin
Empress: David Lush
Gleichen: Isaac McCune
Grande Prairie: William Sharpe
Grouard: Leonidas Giroux
Hand Hills: Wallace Warren Cross
Innisfail: Alban MacLellan
Lac Ste. Anne: Albert Bourcier
Lacombe: Duncan MacMillan
Leduc: Ronald Ansley
Lethbridge: Hans Wight
Little Bow: Peter Dawson
Macleod: James Hartley
Medicine Hat: John Lyle Robinson
Nanton-Claresholm: Harry Haslam
Okotoks-High River: William Morrison
Olds: Herbert Ash
Peace River: William Lampley
Pembina: Harry Knowlton Brown
Pincher Creek: Roy Taylor
Ponoka: Edith Rogers
Red Deer: Alfred Hooke
Ribstone: Albert Blue
Rocky Mountain: Ernest Duke
St. Albert: Charles Holder
St. Paul: Joseph Beaudry
Sedgewick: Albert Fee
Stettler: Charles Cockroft
Stony Plain: William Hayes
Sturgeon: James Popil
Taber: James Hansen
Vegreville: James McPherson
Vermilion: William Fallow
Victoria: Samuel Calvert
Wainwright: William Masson
Warner: Solon Low
Wetaskiwin: John Wingblade
Whitford: Isidore Goresky

=== Synopsis of results ===
Results by riding – 1935 Alberta general election (all except Calgary and Edmonton)
Riding	First-preference votes								Turnout (Note: including spoilt ballots)	Final counts				Winning party	
Name	SC	UFA	Lib	Con	Lab	Comm	Ind	Total	Turnout	SC	UFA	Lib	I-Lib	1930	1935
Acadia	1,834	628	289	–	–	–	–	2,751	90.3%	Elected on 1st count				UFA	SC
Alexandra	2,479	924	561	202	–	197	–	4,363	78.3%	Elected on 1st count				UFA	SC
Athabasca	1,764	–	950	315	–	–	–	3,029	71.0%	Elected on 1st count				Lib	SC
Beaver River	1,751	572	775	147	–	–	–	3,245	66.8%	Elected on 1st count				Lib	SC
Bow Valley	1,776	401	591	–	–	–	204	2,972	85.9%	Elected on 1st count				Ind	SC
Camrose	4,335	1,039	1,395	–	–	–	–	6,769	86.7%	Elected on 1st count				UFA	SC
Cardston	2,027	565	471	–	–	–	–	3,063	95.4%	Elected on 1st count				UFA	SC
Clover Bar	2,503	844	1,105	264	–	–	–	4,716	86.0%	Elected on 1st count				UFA	SC
Cochrane	1,880	591	628	337	–	–	–	3,436	87.9%	Elected on 1st count				UFA	SC
Coronation	2,674	844	625	–	–	–	–	4,143	87.4%	Elected on 1st count				UFA	SC
Cypress	1,689	587	798	–	–	–	51	3,125	83.0%	Elected on 1st count				UFA	SC
Didsbury	2,731	610	607	303	–	–	–	4,251	85.0%	Elected on 1st count				UFA	SC
Drumheller	2,158	–	341	–	–	342	778	3,619	84.4%	Elected on 1st count				Ind	SC
Edson	2,154	–	1,620 (Note: John Sedgwick Cowper was previously a member of the Legislative Assembly of British Columbia.)	–	1,414	–	–	5,188	76.0%	2,443	–	2,068	–	Lab	SC
Empress	1,453	324	239	–	–	–	–	2,016	84.5%	Elected on 1st count				UFA	SC
Gleichen	2,093	895	569	439	–	–	–	3,996	84.3%	Elected on 1st count				UFA	SC
Grande Prairie	2,741	1,809	2,387	464	–	–	–	7,401	75.6%	3,142	–	3,061	–	UFA	SC
Grouard	1,447	346	2,272	–	–	–	–	4,065	78.1%	Elected on 1st count				Lib	Lib
Hand Hills	3,270	707	552	–	–	–	–	4,529	86.5%	Elected on 1st count				UFA	SC
Innisfail	2,805	386	583	318	–	–	–	4,092	87.5%	Elected on 1st count				UFA	SC
Lac Ste. Anne	1,668	1,080	897	133	–	–	–	3,778	75.6%	1,791	1,518	–	–	UFA	SC
Lacombe	3,483	721	838	519	–	–	–	5,561	86.6%	Elected on 1st count				UFA	SC
Leduc	2,940	357	1,305	166	–	–	–	4,768	82.0%	Elected on 1st count				Lib	SC
Lethbridge	3,700	–	1,946	341	654	–	–	6,641	81.6%	Elected on 1st count				Lab	SC
Little Bow	2,322	704	474	–	–	–	–	3,500	87.9%	Elected on 1st count				UFA	SC
Macleod	1,680	650	387	–	–	–	–	2,717	86.1%	Elected on 1st count				UFA	SC
Medicine Hat	3,236	–	1,252	653	–	–	–	5,141	83.3%	Elected on 1st count				Lib	SC
Nanton-Claresholm	1,767	612	512	269	–	–	–	3,165	86.3%	Elected on 1st count				UFA	SC
Okotoks-High River	3,062	1,005	970	452	–	–	–	5,489	85.8%	Elected on 1st count				UFA	SC
Olds	3,538	694	955	167	–	–	–	5,354	91.6%	Elected on 1st count				UFA	SC
Peace River	2,474	994	1,389	308	–	–	–	5,165	69.6%	2,269	–	1,898	–	UFA	SC
Pembina	3,133	1,030	1,145	183	–	–	–	5,491	80.1%	Elected on 1st count				UFA	SC
Pincher Creek	1,214	296	528	312	–	–	–	2,350	88.4%	Elected on 1st count				Lib	SC
Ponoka	2,295	879	696	–	–	–	–	3,870	86.6%	Elected on 1st count				UFA	SC
Red Deer	3,565	–	788	612	–	291	622	5,878	85.6%	Elected on 1st count				UFA	SC
Ribstone	2,684	499	589	–	–	–	–	3,772	87.3%	Elected on 1st count				UFA	SC
Rocky Mountain	2,996	–	1,033	–	–	1,080	389	5,498	82.0%	Elected on 1st count				Ind	SC
St. Albert	1,431	116	446	–	–	–	1,253 (Note: Lucien Boudreau (Ind-Liberal) - 955 votes; A.S. McRae (Ind-Conservative) - 258 votes.)	3,206	86.4%	1,619	–	–	1,445	UFA	SC
St. Paul	2,567	946	1,963	–	–	–	–	5,476	82.2%	2,679	–	2,364	–	Lib	SC
Sedgewick	3,642	933	632	–	–	–	–	5,107	88.7%	Elected on 1st count				UFA	SC
Stettler	3,603	522	882	271	–	–	–	5,278	89.9%	Elected on 1st count				UFA	SC
Stony Plain	2,832	312	1,472	171	–	–	–	4,787	82.8%	Elected on 1st count				UFA	SC
Sturgeon	2,465	857	1,533	361	–	–	560	5,776	80.8%	2,729	–	2,053	–	UFA	SC
Taber	2,879	757	642	–	–	–	–	4,278	79.9%	Elected on 1st count				UFA	SC
Vegreville	2,817	995	1,681	109	–	–	–	5,602	82.5%	3,047	–	2,065	–	UFA	SC
Vermilion	2,452	876	1,062	244	–	838	–	5,472	82.8%	2,664	–	1,437	–	UFA	SC
Victoria	2,045	319	1,181	141	–	–	–	3,686	77.8%	Elected on 1st count				UFA	SC
Wainwright	2,382	811	953	194	–	–	–	4,340	83.6%	Elected on 1st count				UFA	SC
Warner	1,702	588	534	–	–	–	227	3,051	82.7%	Elected on 1st count				UFA	SC
Wetaskiwin	2,762	506	1,149	187	–	141	–	4,745	85.7%	Elected on 1st count				Lib	SC
Whitford	1,265	940	615	–	–	966	–	3,786	77.8%	1,370	1,121	–	–	UFA	SC

= Open seat
= turnout is above provincial average
= Candidate was in previous Legislature
= Incumbent had switched allegiance
= Previously incumbent in another riding
= Not incumbent; was previously elected to the Legislature
= Incumbency arose from by-election gain
= previously an MP in the House of Commons of Canada
= Multiple candidates

=== Multi-member districts ===
District	Seats won (in order declared)
Calgary	
Edmonton	

Social Credit
Liberal
Conservative

= Candidate was in previous Legislature
= First-time MLA
= Previously incumbent in another district.

== STV analysis ==
=== Exhausted votes ===
Twelve districts went beyond first-preference counts in order to determine winning candidates:

Exhausted votes (1935)
District	Counts		Exhausted	
District	1st preference	Final	Votes	% of 1st pref
Calgary	41,193	37,827	3,366	8.17
Edmonton	37,267	35,625	1,642	4.41
Edson	5,188	4,511	677	13.05
Grande Prairie	7,401	6,203	1,198	16.19
Lac Ste. Anne	3,778	3,309	469	12.41
Peace River	5,165	4,167	998	19.32
St. Albert	3,206	3,064	142	4.43
St. Paul	5,476	5,043	433	7.91
Sturgeon	5,776	4,782	994	17.21
Vegreville	5,602	5,112	490	8.75
Vermilion	5,472	4,101	1,371	25.05
Whitford	3,786	2,491	1,295	34.20

=== Calgary ===
There were more contestants in the race compared to 1930, but only Social Credit ran a full slate of candidates:

Party	Candidates			MLAs elected		
Party	1935	1930	±	1935	1930	±
Conservative	4	4	Steady	1	3	2▼
Dominion Labor	3	3	Steady	–	1	1▼
Liberal	4	3	1▲	1	2	1▼
Social Credit	6	–	6▲	4	–	4▲
Communist	1	1	Steady	–	–	–
Independent Labour	1	–	1▲	–	–	–
Independent	1	2	1▼	–	–	–
Total	20	13	7▲	6	6	Steady

Eighteen counts were needed to determine the outcome, but count-by-count results are not available. (Note: Actual figures are only available at the Provincial Archives of Alberta.) There are only detailed results for the later counts. (Note: Published reports did not contain the final count for W. Little at the 18th round, but academic work suggests a value of 4,002 (ie, quota of 5,885 * 0.68), which is used in the following table. Other counts are derived from the reports.) Manning, Irwin, Anderson, Bowlen and Gostick achieved quota, and Hugill obtained the next best result on the final count.

Calgary (1935 Alberta general election) (analysis of transferred votes, sorted by maximum votes, detailed results from 13th count onward)
Party	Candidate	Maximum round	Maximum votes	Share in maximum round	Maximum votes First round votes Transfer votes
Liberal	John J. Bowlen	17	8,478	21.50%	
Social Credit	Fred Anderson	15	6,638	16.60%	
Conservative	John Irwin	13	6,092	15.19%	
Social Credit	Ernest Manning	1	6,087	14.78%	
Social Credit	Edith Gostick	18	5,886	15.56%	
Social Credit	John Hugill	18	4,399	11.63%	
Social Credit	W. Little (not elected)	18	4,002	10.58%	
Liberal	Robert Weir (not elected)	16	3,327	8.32%	
Social Credit	Oscar Devenish (not elected)	14	3,182	7.94%	
Exhausted votes			3,366	8.17%	

=== Edmonton ===
The 1935 race had a broader field of candidates compared to 1930:

Party	Candidates			MLAs elected		
Party	1935	1930	±	1935	1930	±
Conservative	6	6	Steady	1	3	2▼
Dominion Labor	6	4	2▲	–	1	1▼
Liberal	6	4	2▲	3	1	2▲
Social Credit	6	–	6▲	2	–	2▲
United Farmers	1	1	Steady	–	1	1▼
Communist	1	1	Steady	–	–	–
Reconstruction	1	–	1▲	–	–	–
Independent	–	1	1▼	–	–	–
Total	27	17	10▲	6	6	Steady

As a result, the number of counts needed to select the six MLAs expanded from 14 to 23. Howson, Barnes and Van Allen won on achieving quota; Duggan, Mullen and O'Connor had the best results in the final round.

Edmonton (1935 Alberta general election) (six members elected, candidates ranked in order of 1st preference)
Party	Candidate	FPv%	Count																						
Party	Candidate	FPv%	1	2	3	4	5	6	7	8	9	10	11	12	13	14	15	16	17	18	19	20	21	22	23
Liberal	William Howson	24.52%	9,139																						
Social Credit	Samuel A. Barnes	12.01%	4,476	4,492	4,492	4,495	4,500	4,513	4,524	4,524	4,533	4,597	4,703	4,809	4,828	4,855	5,357								
Social Credit	W. S. Hall	7.56%	2,818	2,830	2,830	2,831	2,832	2,837	2,841	2,850	2,856	2,906	2,985	3,029	3,040	3,051	3,223	3,248	3,373	3,390	3,468	3,509	4,542	4,719	4,721
Social Credit	David B. Mullen	6.71%	2,500	2,510	2,512	2,514	2,517	2,520	2,522	2,526	2,529	2,546	2,838	2,857	2,870	2,877	3,244	3,247	3,323	3,332	3,361	3,407	4,785	4,928	4,932
United Farmers	John Lymburn	5.61%	2,092	2,150	2,151	2,158	2,168	2,205	2,209	2,218	2,229	2,283	2,286	2,522	2,556	2,680	2,688	2,688	2,887	2,919	3,180	3,267	3,305		
Social Credit	Orvis A. Kennedy	4.78%	1,781	1,791	1,793	1,799	1,799	1,802	1,802	1,804	1,810	1,826	2,106	2,118	2,122	2,142	2,407	2,412	2,501	2,511	2,547	2,584			
Conservative	David Duggan	3.93%	1,466	1,497	1,524	1,528	1,532	1,533	1,540	1,658	1,659	1,745	1,747	1,776	1,791	2,205	2,206	2,206	2,231	2,252	3,334	3,496	3,516	5,042	5,078
Liberal	George Van Allen	3.37%	1,255	2,862	2,866	2,869	2,874	2,881	2,886	2,893	2,899	2,946	2,946	2,955	3,336	3,422	3,434	3,434	3,579	4,080	4,224	4,980	4,996	5,468	
Social Credit	Mark W. Robertson	3.34%	1,243	1,248	1,252	1,252	1,253	1,257	1,257	1,259	1,266	1,272	1,351	1,366	1,369	1,372									
Liberal	Marion Conroy	3.32%	1,238	1,678	1,679	1,680	1,695	1,700	1,719	1,727	1,732	1,848	1,853	1,895	1,986	2,007	2,014	2,014	2,108	2,327	2,483				
Conservative	William Atkinson	3.27%	1,220	1,242	1,261	1,265	1,266	1,273	1,278	1,351	1,359	1,398	1,401	1,454	1,492	1,950	1,954	1,954	2,005	2,025					
Liberal	Gerald O'Connor	2.99%	1,116	1,641	1,644	1,645	1,649	1,653	1,656	1,663	1,668	1,675	1,679	1,722	2,009	2,066	2,069	2,069	2,122	2,834	2,974	4,161	4,182	4,820	4,922
Communist	Jan Lakeman	2.94%	1,096	1,105	1,109	1,110	1,114	1,146	1,158	1,158	1,186	1,217	1,220	1,456	1,473	1,484	1,491	1,491							
Conservative	Frederick Jamieson	2.76%	1,029	1,069	1,080	1,080	1,085	1,086	1,086	1,173	1,178	1,186	1,188	1,249	1,280										
Social Credit	G. L. King	2.26%	843	845	846	846	849	849	850	852	855	871													
Liberal	J. C. M. Marshall	1.81%	673	1,186	1,188	1,190	1,192	1,196	1,198	1,210	1,215	1,243	1,247	1,293	1,560	1,589	1,593	1,593	1,642						
Conservative	J. E. Basarab	1.80%	671	681	682	683	684	685	686	695	696														
Liberal	Walter Morrish	1.64%	612	1,078	1,079	1,083	1,096	1,100	1,102	1,112	1,121	1,157	1,158	1,211											
Dominion Labor	James East	1.36%	505	515	523	556	608	651	775	781	1,125	1,140	1,141												
Conservative	Emily Fitzsimon	0.97%	363	365	371	372	372	375	375																
Dominion Labor	James W. Findlay	0.89%	331	337	350	376	408	431	462	464															
Reconstruction	Elsie Wright	0.52%	192	196	200	201	205																		
Dominion Labor	Carl Berg	0.52%	192	194	197	220	235	238																	
Dominion Labor	Sidney Bowcott	0.45%	166	172	181	186																			
Dominion Labor	Alfred Farmilo	0.34%	127	129	129																				
Conservative	D. M. Ramsay	0.19%	71	72																					
Dominion Labor	Sidney Parsons	0.14%	52	54																					
Exhausted ballots		—	—	4	4	4	10	12	17	25	27	87	94	231	231	243	263	263	848	949	1,048	1,215	1,293	1,642	1,642
Electorate: 49,212 Valid: 37,267 Spoilt: 785 Quota: 5,324 Turnout: 38,052 (77.3%)

Edmonton (1935 Alberta general election) (analysis of transferred votes, candidates ranked in order of 1st preference)
Party	Candidate	Maximum round	Maximum votes	Share in maximum round	Maximum votes First round votes Transfer votes
Liberal	William R. Howson	1	9,139	24.52%	
Social Credit	Samuel Barnes	15	5,357	14.48%	
Social Credit	W. S. Hall	23	4,721	13.25%	
Social Credit	David B. Mullen	23	4,932	13.84%	
UFA	John Lymburn	21	3,305	9.19%	
Social Credit	Orvis A. Kennedy	20	2,584	7.17%	
Conservative	David Duggan	23	5,078	14.25%	
Liberal	George Van Allen	22	5,468	15.35%	
Social Credit	Mark W. Robertson	14	1,372	3.71%	
Liberal	Marion Conroy	19	2,483	6.86%	
Conservative	William Atkinson	18	2,025	5.58%	
Liberal	Gerald O'Connor	23	4,922	13.82%	
Communist	Jan Lakeman	16	1,491	6.52%	
Conservative	Frederick Jamieson	13	1,280	3.46%	
Social Credit	G. L. King	10	871	2.34%	
Liberal	J. C. M. Marshall	17	1,642	4.51%	
Conservative	J. E. Basarab	9	696	1.87%	
Liberal	Walter Morrish	12	1,211	3.27%	
Dominion Labor	James East	11	1,141	3.07%	
Conservative	Emily Fitzsimon	7	375	1.01%	
Dominion Labor	James W. Findlay	8	464	1.25%	
Reconstruction	Elsie Wright	5	205	0.55%	
Dominion Labor	Carl Berg	6	238	0.64%	
Dominion Labor	Sidney Bowcott	4	186	0.50%	
Dominion Labor	Alfred Farmilo	3	129	0.35%	
Conservative	D. M. Ramsay	2	72	0.19%	
Dominion Labor	Sidney Parsons	2	54	0.14%	
Exhausted votes			1,642	4.41%	

Initial terminal transfer rates for votes (1930)
Transferred from	Non-transferrable	% transferred to							Total
Transferred from	Non-transferrable	Socred	Liberal	UFA	Conservative	Dominion Labor	Communist	Reconstruction	Total
█ Liberal (Howson)	4	55	3,551	58	106	28	9	4	3,815
█ Liberal (Howson)	0.10%	1.44%	93.08%	1.52%	2.78%	0.73%	0.24%	0.10%	100.00%
█ Conservative (Jamieson)	12	68	193	124	872	–	11	–	1,280
█ Conservative (Jamieson)	0.94%	5.31%	15.08%	9.69%	68.13%	–	0.86%	–	100.00%
█ Social Credit (King)	7	836	14	3	7	1	3	–	871
█ Social Credit (King)	0.80%	95.98%	1.61%	0.34%	0.80%	0.11%	0.34%	–	100.00%
█ United Farmers (Lymburn)	349	320	1,110	–	1,526	–	–	–	3,305
█ United Farmers (Lymburn)	10.56%	9.68%	33.59%	–	46.17%	–	–	–	100.00%
█ Communist (Lakeman)	585	290	341	199	76	–	–	–	1,491
█ Communist (Lakeman)	39.24%	19.45%	22.87%	13.35%	5.10%	–	–	–	100.00%

== See also ==
- List of Alberta political parties
