= 8th Alberta Legislature =

Canadian Legislative Assembly

- Majority parliament
- Feb. 6, 1936 – Feb. 16, 1940

Parliament leaders
- Premier: William Aberhart; September 3, 1935 – May 23, 1943
- Cabinet: Aberhart cabinet

Party caucuses
- Government: Social Credit Party of Alberta
- Opposition: Liberal Party
- Crossbench: Conservative Party

Legislative Assembly
- Speaker of the Assembly: Nathan Eldon Tanner; February 6, 1936 – January 4, 1937
- Peter Dawson; February 25, 1937 – March 24, 1963
- Members: 63 MLA seats

Sovereign
- Monarch: Edward VIII; January 20, 1936 – December 11, 1936
- George VI; December 11, 1936 – February 6, 1952
- Lieutenant governor: Hon. William L. Walsh; May 5, 1931 – October 1, 1936
- Hon. Philip Carteret Hill Primrose; October 1, 1936 – March 17, 1937
- Hon. John Campbell Bowen; March 23, 1937 – February 1, 1950

Sessions
- 1st session February 6, 1936 – April 7, 1936
- 2nd session August 25, 1936 – September 1, 1936
- 3rd session February 25, 1937 – June 17, 1937
- 4th session August 3, 1937 – August 6, 1937
- 5th session September 24, 1937 – October 5, 1937
- 6th session February 10, 1938 – April 8, 1938
- 7th session November 15, 1938 – November 22, 1938
← 7th	→ 9th

The 8th Alberta Legislative Assembly was in session from February 6, 1936, to February 16, 1940, with the membership of the assembly determined by the results of the 1935 Alberta general election held on August 22, 1935. The Legislature officially resumed on February 6, 1936, and continued until the ninth session was prorogued and dissolved on February 16, 1940, prior to the 1940 Alberta general election.

Alberta's sixth government was controlled by the majority Social Credit Party of Alberta for the first time, led by Premier William Aberhart. There was no Official Opposition in Alberta between 1926 and 1941 due to the Independent Movement which saw a majority of non-UFA candidates elected as independents. The Speaker was Nathan Eldon Tanner who would resign in 1937 and be replaced by Peter Dawson.

The previous government formed by United Farmers of Alberta would lose every seat in the 1935 election following the John Edward Brownlee sex scandal, and the upstart Social Credit dynasty would begin.

== 1937 Social Credit backbenchers' revolt ==
The Social Credit backbenchers' revolt was a rebellion against Premier William Aberhart by a group of backbench (not part of the cabinet) members of the Legislative Assembly (MLAs) from his Social Credit League during the third session. The dissidents were unhappy with Aberhart's failure to provide Albertans with Can$25 monthly dividends through social credit as he had promised before his 1935 election. When the government's 1937 budget made no move to implement the dividends, many MLAs revolted openly and threatened to defeat the government in a confidence vote.

The revolt took place in a period of turmoil for Aberhart and his government: besides the dissident backbenchers, half of the cabinet resigned or was fired over a period of less than a year. Aberhart also faced criticism for planning to attend the coronation of George VI at the province's expense and for stifling a recall attempt against him by the voters of his constituency.

After a stormy debate in which the survival of the government was called into question, a compromise was reached whereby Aberhart's government relinquished considerable power to a committee of backbenchers. This committee, dominated by insurgents, recruited two British social credit experts to come to Alberta and advise on the implementation of social credit. Among the experts' first moves was to require a loyalty pledge from Social Credit MLAs. Almost all signed, thus ending the crisis, though most of the legislation the experts proposed was ultimately disallowed or struck down as unconstitutional.

== Bills ==
=== Reduction and Settlement of Debts Act ===
The Reduction and Settlement of Debts Act (Bill 15) was the first controversial bills passed during the 8th Legislature under the Social Credit government occurred during the second session in 1936. The Bill originally titled An Act to Provide for the Reduction and Settlement of Certain Indebtedness sought to eliminate compound interest on debts, make Foreclosures on farms and homes increasingly difficult, and restrict the ability for municipalities to seize land for property tax arrears. Lieutenant Governor William L. Walsh expressed concerns over the bills “ruthless” way that the Act proposed to deal with the rights of creditors. Walsh provided the Premier with three options: delay the bill until the next session, send the legislation for review to the Supreme Court of Alberta or do nothing in which case the Lieutenant Governor would likely withhold Royal Assent of the bill. The government chose to send the bill for review by the Supreme Court of Alberta and in February 1937, Justice Albert Ewing of the Supreme Court of Alberta ruled the Reduction and Settlement of Debts Act unconstitutional. The government appealed the decision but those appeals were unsuccessful.

=== Accurate News and Information Act ===
The Accurate News and Information Act, introduced as An Act to ensure the Publication of Accurate News and Information was a statute introduced by Provincial Treasurer Solon Earl Low and passed by the Legislative Assembly of Alberta in the fifth session of the Eighth Legislature on October 4, 1937, at the instigation of William Aberhart's Social Credit government. It would have required newspapers to print "clarifications" of stories that a committee of Social Credit legislators deemed inaccurate, and to reveal their sources on demand.

The act was a result of the stormy relationship between Aberhart and the press, which dated to before the 1935 election, in which the Social Credit League was elected to government. Virtually all of Alberta's newspapers—especially the Calgary Herald—were critical of Social Credit, as were a number of publications from elsewhere in Canada. Even the American media had greeted Aberhart's election with derision.

Though the act won easy passage through the Social Credit-dominated legislature, Lieutenant-Governor of Alberta John C. Bowen reserved royal assent until the Supreme Court of Canada evaluated the act's legality. In 1938's Reference re Alberta Statutes, the court found that it was unconstitutional, and it never became law.

=== Métis Population Betterment Act ===
The Métis Population Betterment Act (Bill 6) was a statute passed by the Legislative Assembly of Alberta in the seventh session in 1938 that created a committee of members of the Métis and the government to plot out lands for allocation to the Métis. Twelve areas were mapped out for this purpose, with the idea of creating ongoing cooperation between the Métis and Crown representatives toward the improvement of quality of life for the Métis. It came to light that certain lands given to the Métis were insufficient to create a living for the people placed there, and these settlements were rescinded. By 1960, only eight of the original lands were still in the hands of the Métis.

The Act came as a result of the findings of the Royal Commission on the Condition of the Halfbreed Population of the Province of Alberta (Ewing Commission) chaired by Justice Albert Ewing and included members James McCrie Douglas and Dr. Edward A. Brathwaite. The Commission recommended that Alberta's Métis should have land reservations for farming colonies/settlements, homes, and schools. Additionally, in recognition that the Métis were the original inhabitants of the proposed land allotments, the Commission acknowledged group rights and acknowledged that settlement Métis should have preference over nonresidents in harvesting fish, fur, and game.

=== The Recall Act ===
As part of Aberhart's mandate, the Social Credit government sought to bring recall petitions to Alberta. The Speech from the Throne on February 6, 1936 included a statement promising the government would introduce recall provisions for Members of the Legislative Assembly. On March 13, 1936, Provincial Secretary Ernest Manning introduced An Act providing for the Recall of Members of the Legislative Assembly (Bill 76) and subsequently passed third reading on April 3, 1936.

Recall did not last long in Alberta, by the fifth session in 1937 a recall petition had started against Premier William Aberhart and members of the opposition unsuccessfully introduced motions in the house to reduce the percentage of the electorate required to successfully recall a MLA. On September 30, 1937 backbench MLA Ernest Duke introduced An Act to repeal The Legislative Assembly (Recall) Act (Bill 11). The bill passed on October 5, 1937, and was retroactive to invalidate any previous recall activities, protecting Premier Aberhart from the active recall activities in his constituency.

== Membership in the 8th Alberta Legislature ==
District	Member	Party	First elected/ previously elected	No.# of term(s)
Acadia	Norman James	Social Credit	1935	1st term
Alexandra	Selmer Berg	Social Credit	1935	1st term
Athabasca	Clarence Tade	Social Credit	1935	1st term
Athabasca	Charles Ross (1935)	Social Credit	1935	1st term
Athabasca	Clarence Tade (1938)	Social Credit	1935, 1938	2nd term*
Beaver River	Lucien Maynard	Social Credit	1935	1st term
Bow Valley	Wilson Cain	Social Credit	1935	1st term
Calgary	Edith Gostick	Social Credit	1935	1st term
Calgary	Ernest Manning	Social Credit	1935	1st term
Calgary	John Irwin	Conservative	1926	3rd term
Calgary	Fred Anderson	Social Credit	1935	1st term
Calgary	John J. Bowlen	Liberal	1930	2nd term
Calgary	John Hugill	Social Credit	1935	1st term
Calgary	John Hugill	Independent Social Credit	1935	1st term
Camrose	William Chant	Social Credit	1935	1st term
Camrose	William Chant	Independent Progressive	1935	1st term
Cardston	Nathan Eldon Tanner	Social Credit	1935	1st term
Clover Bar	Floyd Baker	Social Credit	1935	1st term
Cochrane	William King	Social Credit	1935	1st term
Coronation	Glenville MacLachlan	Social Credit	1935	1st term
Cypress	August Flamme	Social Credit	1935	1st term
Didsbury	Edward P. Foster	Social Credit	1935	1st term
Drumheller	Herbert Ingrey	Social Credit	1935	1st term
Edmonton	William Howson	Liberal	1930	2nd term
Edmonton	Samuel Barnes	Social Credit	1935	1st term
Edmonton	Samuel Barnes	Independent Progressive	1935	1st term
Edmonton	George Van Allen (1935)	Liberal	1935	1st term
Edmonton	David Milwyn Duggan	Conservative	1926	3rd term
Edmonton	David Mullen	Social Credit	1935	1st term
Edmonton	Gerald O'Connor	Liberal	1935	1st term
Edmonton	Walter Morrish (1936)	Liberal	1936	1st term
Edmonton	Edward Gray (1937)	Liberal	1937	1st term
Edson	Joseph Unwin	Social Credit	1935	1st term
Empress	David Lush	Social Credit	1935	1st term
Gleichen	Isaac McCune	Social Credit	1935	1st term
Grande Prairie	William Sharpe	Social Credit	1935	1st term
Grouard	Leonidas Giroux	Liberal	1924	4th term
Grouard	Joseph Tremblay (1936)	Liberal	1936	1st term
Hand Hills	Wallace Warren Cross	Social Credit	1935	1st term
Innisfail	Alban MacLellan	Social Credit	1935	1st term
Innisfail	Alban MacLellan	Independent Progressive	1935	1st term
Lac Ste. Anne	Albert Bourcier	Social Credit	1935	1st term
Lacombe	Duncan MacMillan	Social Credit	1935	1st term
Leduc	Ronald Ansley	Social Credit	1935	1st term
Lethbridge	Hans Wight	Social Credit	1935	1st term
Lethbridge	Peter M. Campbell (1937)	Independent Progressive	1937	1st term
Little Bow	Peter Dawson	Social Credit	1935	1st term
Macleod	James Hartley	Social Credit	1935	1st term
Medicine Hat	John Lyle Robinson	Social Credit	1935	1st term
Nanton-Claresholm	Harry Haslam	Social Credit	1935	1st term
Okotoks-High River	William Morrison	Social Credit	1935	1st term
Okotoks-High River	William Aberhart (1935)	Social Credit	1935	1st term
Olds	Herbert Ash	Social Credit	1935	1st term
Peace River	William Lampley	Social Credit	1935	1st term
Pembina	Harry Knowlton Brown	Social Credit	1935	1st term
Pincher Creek	Roy Taylor	Social Credit	1935	1st term
Ponoka	Edith Rogers	Social Credit	1935	1st term
Red Deer	Alfred Hooke	Social Credit	1935	1st term
Ribstone	Albert Blue	Social Credit	1935	1st term
Rocky Mountain	Ernest Duke	Social Credit	1935	1st term
Sedgewick	Albert Fee	Social Credit	1935	1st term
St. Albert	Charles Holder	Social Credit	1935	1st term
St. Paul	Joseph Beaudry	Social Credit	1935	1st term
Stettler	Charles Cockroft	Social Credit	1935	1st term
Stettler	Charles Cockroft	Independent Progressive	1935	1st term
Stony Plain	William Hayes	Social Credit	1935	1st term
Sturgeon	James Popil	Social Credit	1935	1st term
Taber	James Hansen	Social Credit	1935	1st term
Vegreville	James McPherson	Social Credit	1935	1st term
Vermilion	William Fallow	Social Credit	1935	1st term
Victoria	Samuel Calvert	Social Credit	1935	1st term
Wainwright	William Masson	Social Credit	1935	1st term
Warner	Solon Low	Social Credit	1935	1st term
Wetaskiwin	John Wingblade	Social Credit	1935	1st term
Whitford	William Tomyn	Social Credit	1935	1st term

== Composition at election ==
Number of members per party by date	1935				1936				1937							1938			1939		1940		
Number of members per party by date	Aug 22	Oct 5	Oct 8	Nov 4	Mar 2	Jun 22	Sep 7	Dec 7	?	May 1	?	Aug 9	Oct 7	Sep 2	Dec 2	?	?	Nov 7	Apr 2	Jul 19	Feb 5	?	?
Social Credit	56	55	54	56					55	54		53		52		51	50	51	50	49		48	47
Liberal	5				4	5	4	5			4		5		6								
Conservative	2																						
Independent	0								1	2		3											
Independent Social Credit	0																1				0		
Independent Progressive	0																			1	2	3	4
Total members	63	62	61	63	62	63	62	63			62		63	62	63	62		63	62				
Vacant	0	1	2	0	1	0	1	0			1		0	1	0	1		0	1				
Government Majority	49	48	47	49	50	49	50	49	47	45	46	44	43	42	41	40	38	39	38	36		34	32

Membership changes in the 8th Assembly
Date	Member Name	District	Party	Reason
August 22, 1935	See List of Members			Election day of the 8th Alberta general election
October 5, 1935	William Morrison	Okotoks-High River	Social Credit	Resigned to make room for the Premier.
October 8, 1935	Clarence Tade	Athabasca	Social Credit	Resigned to make room for a cabinet minister.
November 4, 1935	William Aberhart	Okotoks-High River	Social Credit	Acclaimed in a by-election
November 4, 1935	Charles Ross	Athabasca	Social Credit	Acclaimed in a by-election
March 2, 1936	William Howson	Edmonton	Liberal	Appointed to the Supreme Court of Alberta
June 22, 1936	Walter Morrish	Edmonton	Liberal	Elected in a by-election
September 7, 1936	Leonidas Giroux	Grouard	Liberal	Died with an undisclosed illness at Mayo Clinic.
December 7, 1936	Joseph Tremblay	Grouard	Liberal	Elected in a by-election
?	James Hansen	Taber	Independent	
May 1, 1937	William Chant	Camrose	Independent	Forced out of Ministerial position by Order in Council.
1937	George Van Allen	Edmonton	Liberal	Died
August 9, 1937	John Hugill	Calgary	Independent	Resigned as Attorney General and sits as an independent
October 7, 1937	Edward Gray	Edmonton	Liberal	Elected in a by-election
September 2, 1937	Hans Wight	Lethbridge	Social Credit	Resigned seat to accept private sector job.
December 2, 1937	Peter Campbell	Lethbridge	Unity	Elected in a by-election
1938	Charles Ross	Athabasca	Social Credit	Died
< March 1938	Samuel Barnes	Edmonton	Independent Social Credit	Was removed from the Social Credit caucus, to sit as an independent-SC MLA
November 7, 1938	Clarence Tade	Athabasca	Social Credit	Elected in a by-election
April 2, 1939	William Hayes	Stony Plain	Social Credit	Died from heart seizure.
July 19, 1939	Alban MacLellan	Innisfail	Independent Progressive	Nominated as an Independent Progressive candidate
February 5, 1940	Samuel Barnes	Edmonton	Independent Progressive	Picked as President of the Independent Progressives
?	Charles Cockroft	Stettler	Independent Progressive	Joined the Independent Progressives
September 24, 1937	William Chant	Camrose	Independent Progressive	Joined the Independent Progressives
