= Premiership of John Edward Brownlee =

1925–1934 premiership of Alberta, Canada

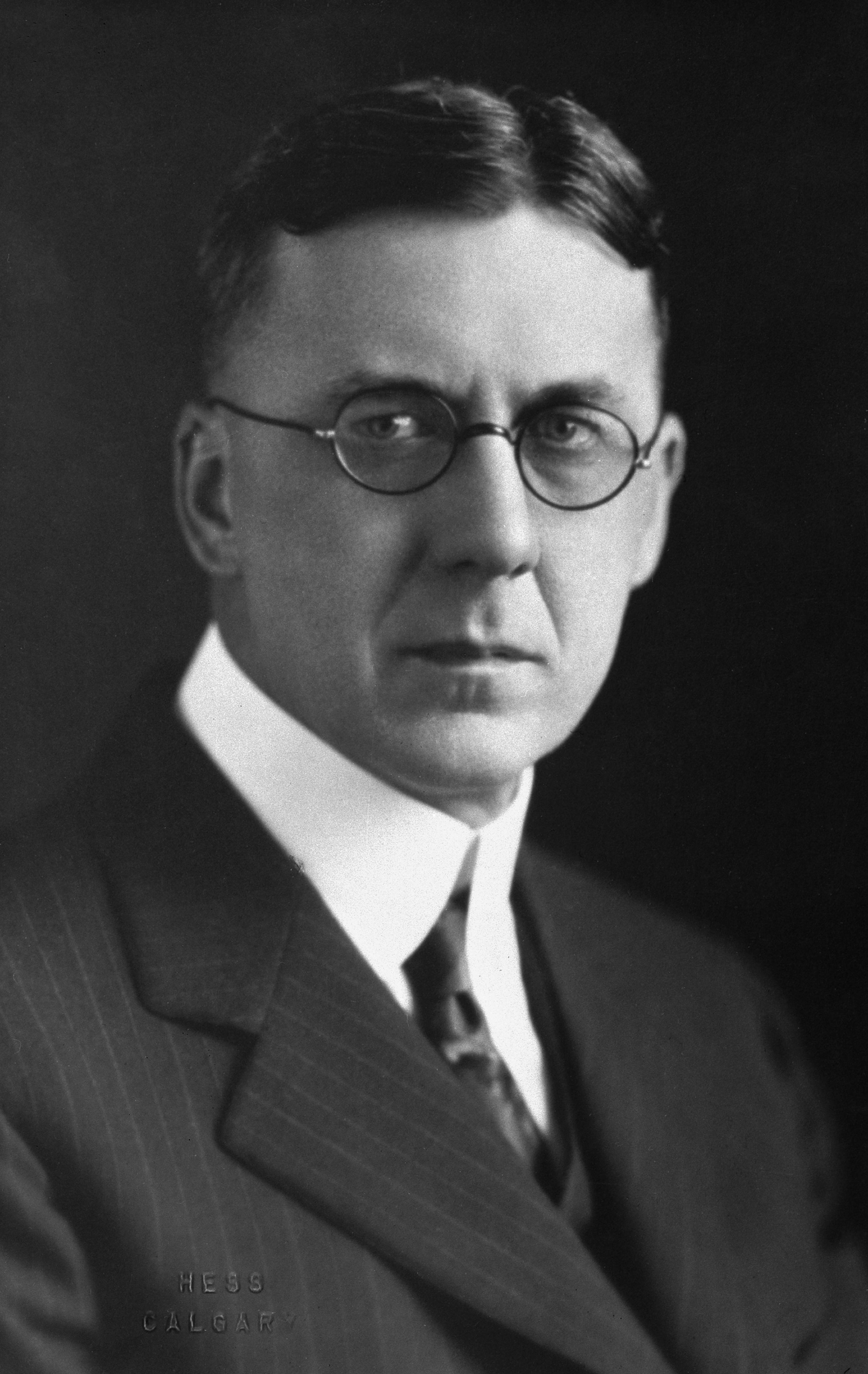
- Premiership of John Edward Brownlee; November 23, 1925 – July 10, 1934
- Monarch: George V
- Premier: John Edward Brownlee
- Cabinet: Brownlee ministry
- Party: United Farmers
- Election: 1926, 1930
- Appointed by: William Egbert
- Seat: Alberta Legislature Building
- Constituency: Ponoka

John Edward Brownlee was Premier of Alberta, Canada, from 1925 to 1934 as leader of the United Farmers of Alberta (UFA) caucus in the Legislative Assembly of Alberta. After a number of early successes, his popularity and his government's suffered from the hardships of the Great Depression. In 1934, he was embroiled in a sex scandal when a family friend sued him for seduction. Though Brownlee denied the events she alleged, when the jury found in her favour he announced his resignation as premier.

Brownlee became premier on November 23, 1925, when, at the request of the UFA caucus, he took over from the indecisive Herbert Greenfield, in whose cabinet he had served as attorney-general. After winning the 1926 election for the UFA, Brownlee achieved a number of successes. In 1929 he signed an agreement with the federal government that transferred control of Alberta's natural resources to its provincial government, which had been a priority of his three immediate predecessors as premier. In 1928 he divested the government of the money-losing railways it had acquired after the syndicates that founded them went out of business, by selling them to Canadian Pacific and Canadian National. This was part of his program to balance the provincial budget, at which he was successful beginning in 1925. His government also introduced a controversial sexual sterilization program to prevent the mentally disabled from procreating.

His government's fortunes entered a decline following the 1930 election. Agricultural prices collapsed, throwing many of Alberta's farmers into abject poverty. Urban unemployment shot up, and the government had no choice but to return to deficit spending. Brownlee tried to broker deals between farmers and banks, but found neither side eager to compromise. Political radicalism increased, as communism, the new Co-operative Commonwealth Federation, and William Aberhart's social credit movement gained new adherents. The UFA itself elected as its president radical socialist Robert Gardiner. In 1933, Prime Minister R. B. Bennett named Brownlee to the Royal Commission on Banking and Currency as a representative of western interests and unorthodox viewpoints. In this capacity, Brownlee travelled the country questioning witnesses, especially bankers and farmers. While he concurred with the commission's ultimate recommendation for the creation of a central bank, he also made a series of recommendations of his own, including that the central bank be controlled entirely by the government.

In 1934 Brownlee was sued for the seduction of Vivian MacMillan, a family friend and a secretary in his government's attorney-general's office. MacMillan claimed that she and Brownlee had carried on an affair for three years. Though Brownlee denied MacMillan's story completely, and though his lawyer exposed inconsistencies in cross-examination, the jury sided with MacMillan. In deference to public outrage over the charges, John Brownlee resigned as premier July 10, 1934, and was succeeded by Richard Gavin Reid.

== Road to prosperity (1925–29) ==
=== 1926 election ===
Brownlee became Premier on November 23, 1925, when Lieutenant Governor of Alberta William Egbert, at the behest of much of the UFA caucus, asked him to form a government. Previously, Brownlee had been Attorney-General in the government of Herbert Greenfield. Greenfield was a weak and indecisive premier, and UFA Members of the Legislative Assembly (MLAs) began increasingly to look to Brownlee to leadership. Though Brownlee resisted early calls to assume the premiership out of loyalty to Greenfield, he was eventually persuaded by the advice of UFA President Henry Wise Wood and Greenfield's assurances that he would happily step aside in Brownlee's favour.

When Brownlee became premier it had already been more than four years since the last election. The law required an election at least every five years, and Brownlee called one for June 28, 1926. The Liberals were the official opposition and the UFA's major opponent in the election; in 1924, with Greenfield still premier, Liberal leader John R. Boyle had predicted a Liberal victory. Boyle had since been appointed to the bench, and the party was now led by Joseph Tweed Shaw. Shaw had served as the Labour Member of Parliament for Calgary West from 1921 until 1925; in this capacity he had been endorsed by and enjoyed warm relations with the UFA. Now, running against the UFA government, this previous relationship and his recorded sentiments about it were handicaps.

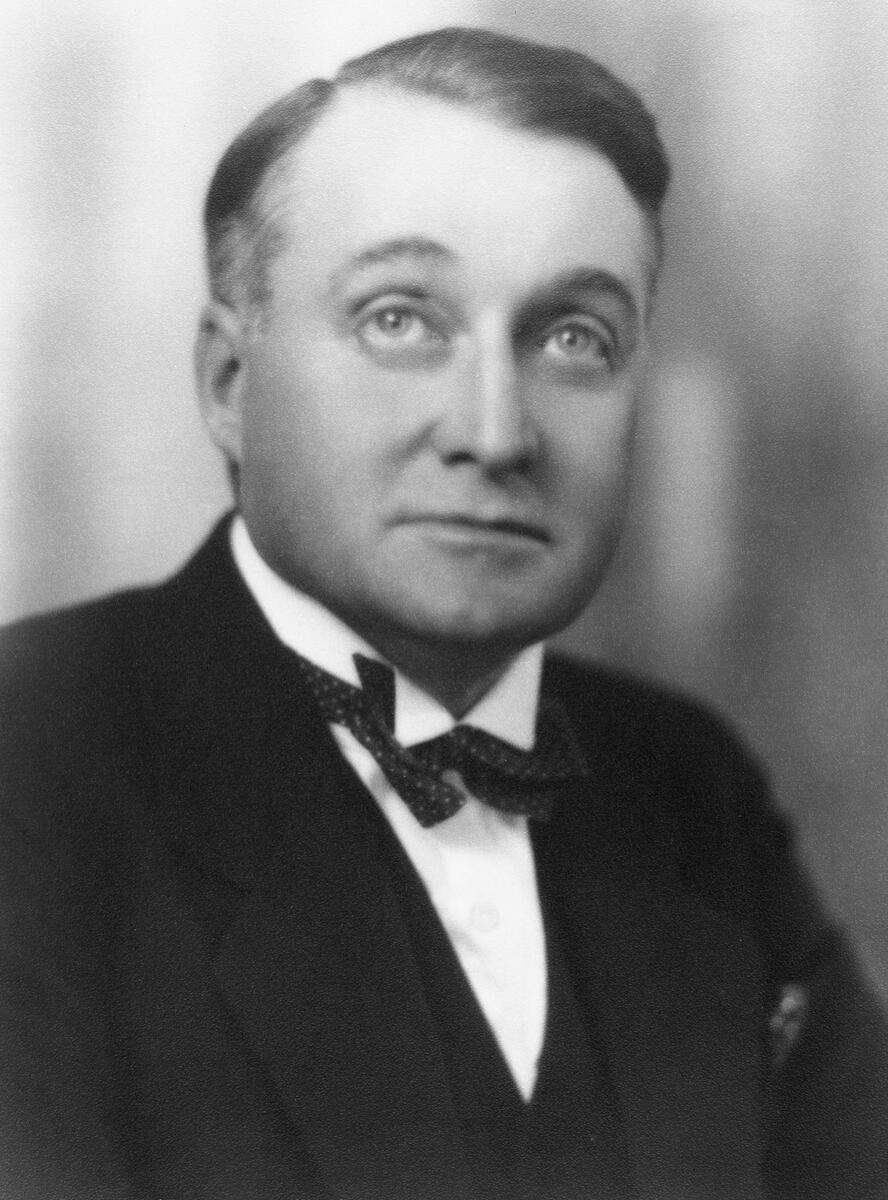
The Conservatives were led by Brownlee's friend A. A. McGillivray in the 1926 election.

The Conservatives were led by A. A. McGillivray, an outstanding courtroom lawyer and friend of Brownlee's who the latter had, as attorney-general, hired to prosecute Emilio Picariello. McGillivray had released his party's entire platform shortly after becoming leader in 1925, and so had little new to say during the campaign. While Brownlee admired his intellect, he considered that he was out of touch with voters' views, likening him to federal Conservative leader Arthur Meighen.

During the campaign, Brownlee travelled the province speaking to public meetings. He emphasized his record and the UFA's, pointing to the province's improving financial position and to its involvement in the establishment of the Alberta Wheat Pool. He touted the period since the last election as "five years of progress". In keeping with the UFA's view of good government as being the non-partisan administration of business rather than any clash of ideologies, he concluded his speeches by asking "Are we going to return in this Province to Government based on the two-party system, or are we going to continue to work for a better [way]?"

The UFA contested 46 of Alberta's 60 seats, including lawyer John Lymburn's candidacy in Edmonton (the first time the rural UFA had run a candidate in either of the province's two major cities). Of these 46 candidates, 43—including Lymburn and Brownlee, who was acclaimed in his Ponoka riding—were elected. This was an increase from the 38 who were elected in 1921. Seven Liberals and four Conservatives were elected. The remaining six seats went to Labour candidates who were generally friendly with the UFA, though Labour MLA Alex Ross, who had served in Brownlee's cabinet, was defeated in Calgary.

=== Relationship with King government ===
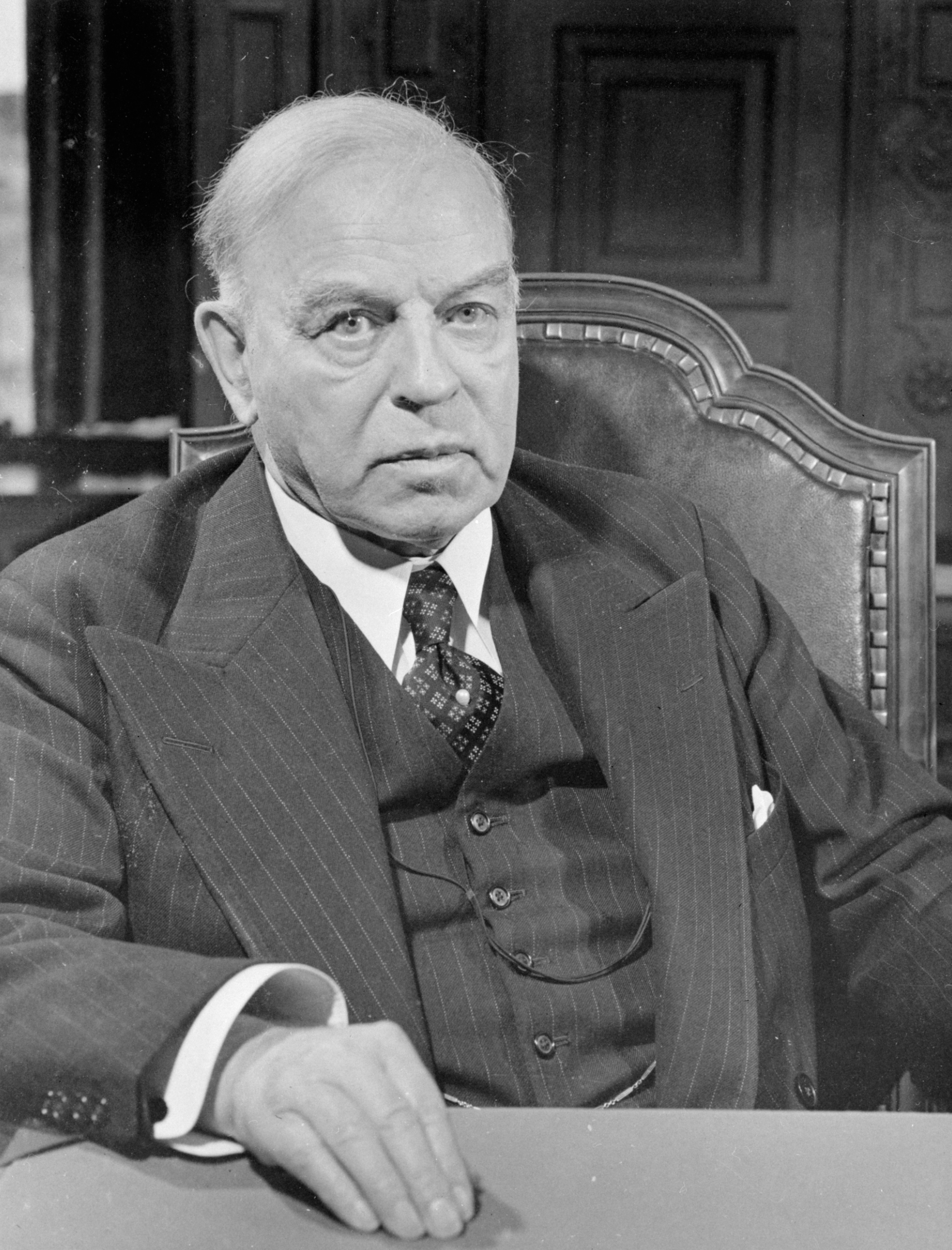
Brownlee enjoyed good relations with Prime Minister William Lyon Mackenzie King.

At the time that Brownlee became premier, provincial governments were still the junior partners in the Canadian federation. Amendments to the Constitution of Canada expanding provincial powers were still years in the future, as was the advent of the welfare state, which expanded the importance of such provincial responsibilities as health care and education. Brownlee was reliant on cooperation from the federal government for virtually all of his major objectives. Liberal William Lyon Mackenzie King was Prime Minister of Canada for almost all of the first five years of Brownlee's premiership.

During this period King led a minority government that relied for its survival in the House of Commons of Canada on a block of Progressive and allied members of Parliament (MPs). Eleven of this group sat as members of the UFA, and Brownlee met with several of them shortly after taking office to coordinate strategy on Alberta's objectives. These MPs were doubly influential with King because of his desire to absorb them into the Liberal Party; he viewed Progressives as "Liberals in a hurry". In Saskatchewan, Liberal Premier Charles Avery Dunning remained in office with the support of the progressive farmers' movement, but in Alberta Brownlee and the UFA were strong enough to govern without the support of the provincial Liberals, who remained bitter opponents of his government.

The relationship between Brownlee and King was helped by the former's preference for the Liberals over the Conservatives. After King lost his seat in the 1925 federal election, he sought and received Brownlee's advice on running in a by-election in any of the four Liberal-controlled Alberta constituencies. Brownlee's preferences were not shared by all in the UFA: his Railways Minister, Vernor Smith, was accused of actively lobbying UFA MPs to vote with Arthur Meighen's Conservatives during the King–Byng Crisis. Moreover, not all of King's ministers shared his desire to cooperate with Progressives: his cabinet's Alberta representative, Charles Stewart, was implacably opposed to Brownlee and the UFA, which had defeated him in the 1921 provincial election when he was the Liberal Premier of Alberta.

King held Brownlee in high regard: he considered recruiting him to his cabinet as a replacement for Stewart in 1925. He put this plan on hold when Brownlee became premier, but did not abandon it. When he made another attempt in 1929, Brownlee expressed interest, reasserting his support for the federal Liberals, but indicated that he was not politically ambitious and that he would expect the right to resign if he disagreed with government policy. King found this response discouraging, and decided to await the results of the 1930 election before pressing the issue. King's defeat in the 1930 federal election rendered the question moot.

=== Natural resources ===
On no issue was Brownlee's relationship with the King government more critical than it was for the control of natural resources. The terms under which Alberta, like Saskatchewan and Manitoba, entered Canada left control of its natural resources with the federal government; the British North America Act gave control of the older provinces' natural resources to their provincial governments. While Alberta did receive compensation in the form of an annual grant, Brownlee, like his three immediate predecessors, felt that it was insufficient. The federal government had been committed since 1920 to the principle of transferring resource control to the province; only the specific terms of the transfer remained to be established. Alberta, though willing to give up the grant, felt that it was owed compensation for land grants and mineral leases that were made by the federal government, but which Alberta would be expected to honour after the resources were transferred.

After years of wrangling between the federal government and Herbert Greenfield's Alberta government—wrangling in which Brownlee, as Greenfield's attorney-general, played a major role—it initially appeared that the transfer was agreed upon: Brownlee met with King in Ottawa in January 1926 and signed the agreement (subject to ratification by the federal Parliament and the Legislative Assembly of Alberta). However, the next month federal lawyer O. M. Biggar came to Edmonton to discuss minor changes to the agreement. One of these changes was a requirement that Alberta administer school lands and the school lands fund "for the support of schools organized and carried on therein, in accordance with the provisions of Section 17 of the Alberta Act". Understanding this to mean only that the province would be required to use the school lands fund to support schools—a proposition to which Brownlee had no objection—he agreed. It soon emerged that what was actually intended was that Alberta continue to support separate Roman Catholic schools. Brownlee took exception to this, less from any objection to funding Catholic schools than on the principle that education was a matter of provincial jurisdiction, but King would not allow him to rescind his agreement. In fact, the change had been made at the instigation of Ernest Lapointe, King's Quebec lieutenant, who wanted to placate Quebec nationalist leader Henri Bourassa, and in Tim Byrne's opinion "was obviously a political move that had little to do with the agreement". Brownlee countered by putting a modified version of the agreement to his legislature, one that replaced the offending language with "organized in accordance with the laws of the Province". It passed unanimously.

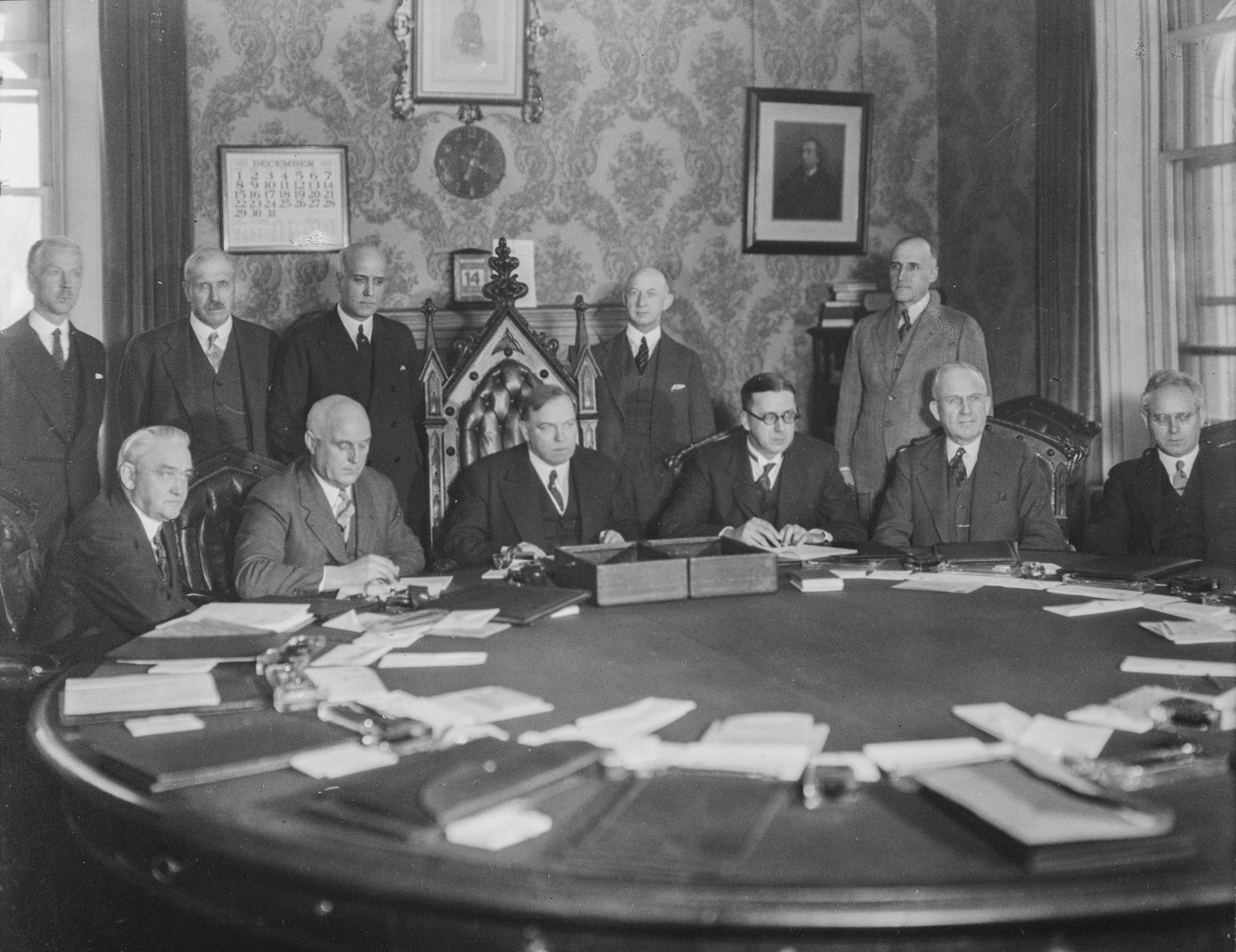
The natural resources agreement between Alberta and the federal government was signed December 14, 1929.

This remained a point of contention until 1929, when Brownlee and King agreed on a new wording: "organized in accordance with the laws of the Province, but in keeping with the letter and the spirit of the constitution." The federal government had already agreed to continue the resource subsidy in perpetuity, but Brownlee objected to its plans to base the amount on Alberta's 1929 population, which would see it receive less than Saskatchewan in perpetuity despite having a much faster-growing population. When the federal Turgeon Commission recommended that Manitoba, in addition to a perpetual subsidy, receive a one-time payment of more than $4 million, Brownlee demanded the same for Alberta. King countered that the purpose of that one time payment was to compensate Manitoba for years during which it, unlike Alberta and Saskatchewan, did not receive a subsidy; Brownlee responded that the federal government had given away more than three times as much of Alberta's land as Manitoba's to the railways. King left the meeting in protest against this new demand, but he was determined to settle with Manitoba and Alberta in order to isolate Saskatchewan Premier James Thomas Milton Anderson and his more extravagant demands. He eventually accepted Brownlee's terms, and an agreement was signed December 14, 1929. The agreement provided for an annual subsidy of $562,000 until Alberta's population reached 800,000 and $750,000 until it reached 1,200,000, after which it would be $1,125,000.

Brownlee was hailed as a hero in Alberta; he had succeeded where every previous premier had failed. Despite sub-zero temperatures, 3,000 people greeted him at the railway station on his return to Edmonton, where he was feted by a band, a bonfire, and fireworks. As Lakeland College historian and Brownlee biographer Franklin Foster wrote, Brownlee was "at the peak of his political career". In Byrne's view, "this was the greatest achievement of Brownlee's career as premier" and would, had he retired at the time, allowed him to "[enter] history as one of Alberta's great premiers".

=== Railways ===
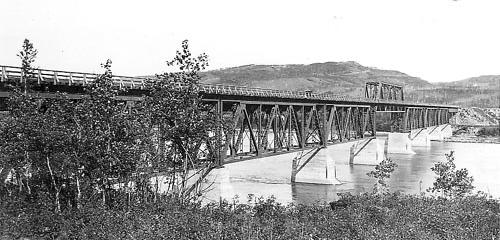
An Edmonton, Dunvegan and British Columbia Railway bridge in Peace River

In 1925, the Alberta government owned four small railways whose founding syndicates, on whose behalf the government had made guarantees to financiers, had collapsed. The Greenfield government's attempts to sell these lines to one or both of Canadian Pacific (CP) or Canadian National (CN) had failed. By 1925, the money-losing lines represented an annual drain of $1.5 million on the provincial budget. Brownlee reprised old attempts in January 1926, making direct offers to CN President Henry Thornton and CP President Edward Wentworth Beatty, but neither was interested, owing to the Alberta lines' debts and operating losses. Faced with no buyers, potential leasers willing to operate the lines only on terms unfavourable to the province, and in Vernor Smith a Minister of Railways who vigorously supported public ownership, Brownlee's government opted to take over direct operation of the lines in 1927. It also moved its contract for the transcontinental transport of the lines' freight from CP to CN, in the hopes that doing so would ensure that both companies would have firsthand knowledge of the lines' freight levels and be interested in acquiring them in better economic times.

Late in 1927, Brownlee began to advocate for joint acquisition of the lines by CN and CP. When, in early 1928, the lines began to show a profit thanks to the management of Deputy Minister of Railways John Callaghan, he began to pursue the idea with more vigour. One of the lines, the Lacombe and North Western, was sold to CP for $1.5 million, and CP and CN made a joint offer of $15 million for the Edmonton, Dunvegan and British Columbia, the largest of the lines. Brownlee recommended against acceptance of the latter offer, believing that the price was too low, the terms of payment too unfavourable (none would be made until 1930, and the interest rate applied was only one and a half percent—less than Brownlee believed that the province could earn in operating profits by keeping the railway), and the result of Alberta being left with a department of railways responsible for a single railway too undesirable.

This caution paid off later in the year when the province received and accepted a $25 million offer from CP (with CN holding an option to acquire 50% ownership) to purchase the remaining lines. Brownlee's negotiating skill was widely praised in the aftermath of the deal.

=== Budget and fiscal policy ===
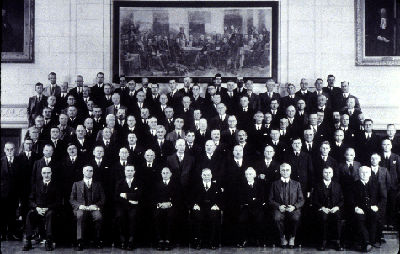
The 1927 Dominion-Provincial conference

As attorney-general in the Greenfield government, Brownlee had been critical of its large deficits, and putting a stop to them was one of his priorities on taking office. He accomplished this objective sooner than he might have expected: though the government had projected a deficit for 1925, on February 11, 1926, he announced to the legislature that the year's accounts had actually recorded a surplus of $188,019. A second small surplus was recorded in 1926. Securing control of natural resources and disposing of the railways were two elements of Brownlee's strategy for ensuring that these surpluses continued, but he also took other measures. For example, on a trip to the United Kingdom in the summer of 1927, he met with international financiers in an effort to increase their confidence in the creditworthiness of his government.

Brownlee advocated austerity despite surpluses. In November 1927, at a First Ministers' conference, he complained of increased public demand for spending in areas of provincial jurisdiction, such as education, health, and welfare. In the meantime, the federal government's relatively reduced role in public spending allowed it the political credit that comes with running surpluses, reducing its debt, and cutting taxes. The following year he recommended that Alberta not opt into the new federal-provincial old age pension program because he felt that Alberta's share was too onerous. The legislature accepted his recommendation for one year, to give him time to persuade the federal government to take on a greater share of the cost, but opted into the program after that even though no greater commitment from the federal government was forthcoming.

In 1928, the Alberta government ran a surplus of $1,578,823, the largest in its history and the second largest in the country. Despite this, Brownlee held firm to his desire to limit spending, warning of serious problems if the economy should go into recession. His resulting "Scrooge-like" reputation began to take a toll on his popularity.

=== Agricultural policy ===
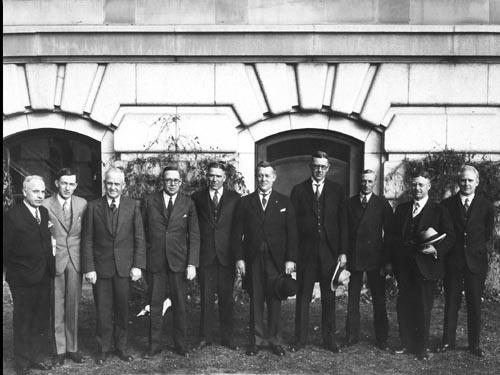
The cabinets of Alberta and Saskatchewan: Brownlee stands fourth from the right.

At Brownlee's instigation, the Greenfield government had implemented a Debt Adjustment Act, which allowed farmers in Alberta's drought-stricken southeast to access credit counselling services and provided a way to settle creditors' claims without ruining farmers or resorting to litigation. At the time, Brownlee had wanted to extend it province-wide, but had been dissuaded by the opposition of moneylenders. In 1928, as premier, Brownlee tried again. Lending institutions again objected, and threatened to withdraw from the province if the act was extended. Brownlee felt that these threats were disingenuous, noting that similar measures already existed to protect merchants. However, it was a prosperous time for farmers, and so mobilized support for the legislation was in shorter supply than it might have been during a time of economic hardship; Brownlee, newly disillusioned with bankers, withdrew the bill.

In autumn 1928, an early frost reduced farm incomes by between ten and 25 percent. Farmers began to demand the extension of the Debt Adjustment Act over the entire province, along with more radical measures. Citing the example of R. W. Barritt, a farmer near Mirror who had lost his farm at the end of 1928 to Canada Permanent Mortgage Corporation despite diligent efforts to pay off his debt, they demanded legislation that would spread the burden of failed crops between debtor and creditor, rather than leaving it all on farmers. Brownlee rejected such calls: "Unless we are to say that individuals or companies who lend money in this Province in good faith must wait indefinitely for repayment, whatever may be the contract or agreement at the time, there comes a limit to the extent to which the Government is justified in interfering".

As attorney-general, Brownlee had played a major role in the creation of the Alberta Wheat Pool. As premier, he continued his support of it. In May 1927 he attended the Second International Cooperative Wheat Pool Conference in Kansas City, where he spoke on the importance of wheat pools in ensuring that farmers received "not occasionally, but with reasonable regularity, the cost of production plus an adequate and substantial return for [their] labor and investment". On his return to Alberta, he participated in a rally to encourage farmers to sign on with the pool; the effort enticed several new farmers, including the manager of the Prince of Wales' ranch, to join. On a July 1927 trip to Europe, he investigated the possibility of marketing Alberta wheat directly to European millers, rather than passing it through multiple grain buyers, exporters, shippers, and importers, but found that European millers feared that buying directly from foreign sources would alienate domestic producers.

=== Educational policy ===
In 1927, Perren Baker, Brownlee's Minister of Education, had announced as his priorities improving the quality of teaching and ensuring that sufficient schools existed for the growing number of students wishing to earn a high school diploma. In pursuit of these objectives, he released a new School Act in 1929, whose major initiative was to consolidate Alberta's thousands of autonomous school districts, each with control over its own finances, into a smaller number of school divisions. The act also moved responsibility for teacher salaries and employment conditions from the school districts to the provincial government and standardized educational mill rates across the province. Educational reformers supported the legislation as a vehicle for coherent reform of the sort that was impossible under the decentralized status quo, but a large majority of rural residents, the staple of the UFA's support base, opposed it for fear that it would lead to the closure of local schools and greater travel distances for rural students. While Brownlee strongly supported the bill, he ordered it withdrawn in deference to public opinion.

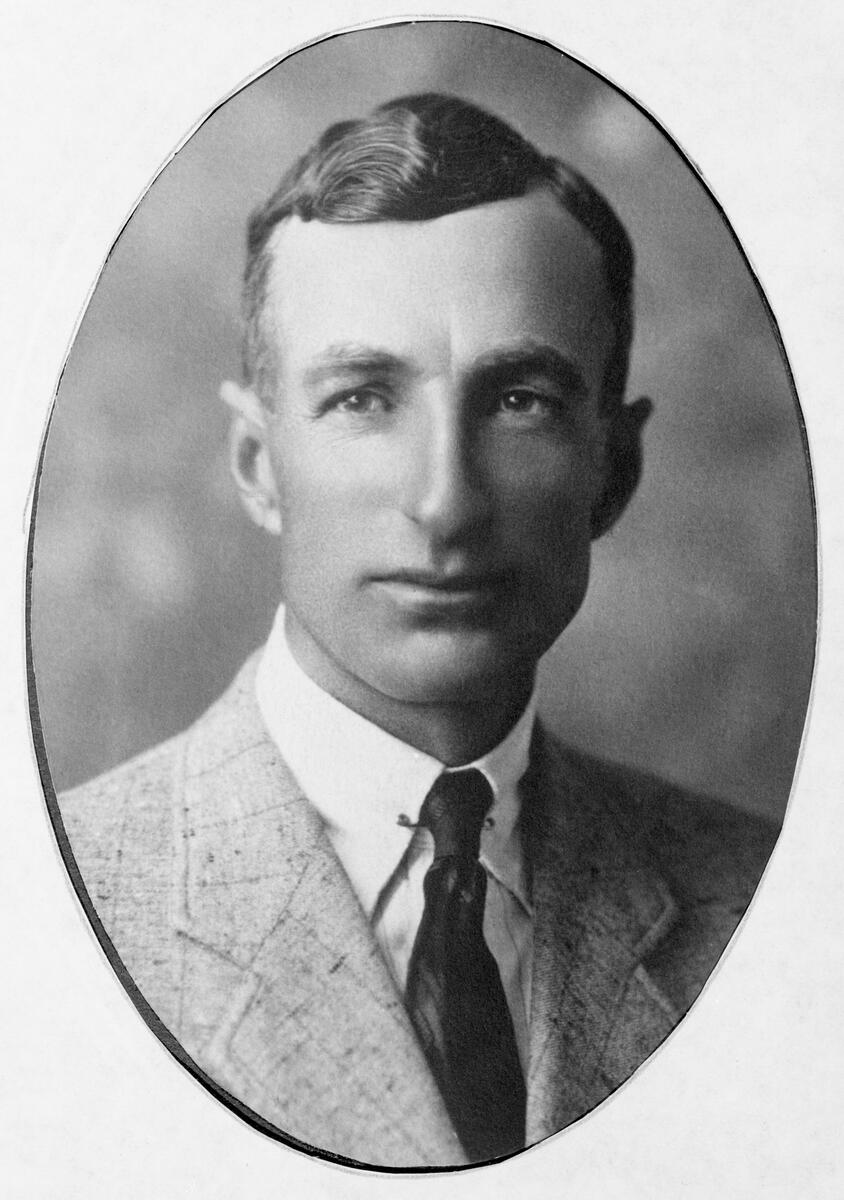
Perren Baker was the Minister of Education for the UFA's entire time in office.

In 1928, Brownlee's government had to select a replacement for Henry Marshall Tory, the first President of the University of Alberta, who was leaving to become the first head of the National Research Council. After narrowing the candidates to Premier of Manitoba John Bracken and University of Manitoba geologist Robert Charles Wallace, Brownlee privately consulted friend and former Progressive leader Thomas Crerar, who knew both men. Crerar reported that in his opinion and those of his close friends Bracken was the better choice, owing to his superior administrative experience. Brownlee eventually opted for Wallace, both because of concern for Bracken's health and for fear that he would be seen as a political appointment.

=== Sexual sterilization ===
The 1920s Progressive movement of which the Brownlee government was a part advocated eugenics, including the sexual sterilization of so-called "mental defectives" to improve the genetic quality of the human race. First-wave feminists such as Nellie McClung made public appeals to "save" intellectually disabled girls from pregnancy. The medical profession suggested that many inmates of insane asylums could be safely released but for the concern that they would procreate. In 1928, the Brownlee government introduced the Sexual Sterilization Act, allowing a Board of Examination—jointly nominated by the University of Alberta Senate and the College of Physicians—to mandate the sterilization of any psychiatric patient if it was "unanimously of the opinion that the patient might be safely discharged if the danger of procreation with its attendant risk of multiplication of the evil by transmission of the disability to progeny were eliminated". Permission of the patient was nominally required, but permission of the nearest relative could be substituted in cases where the board considered the patient not mentally competent.

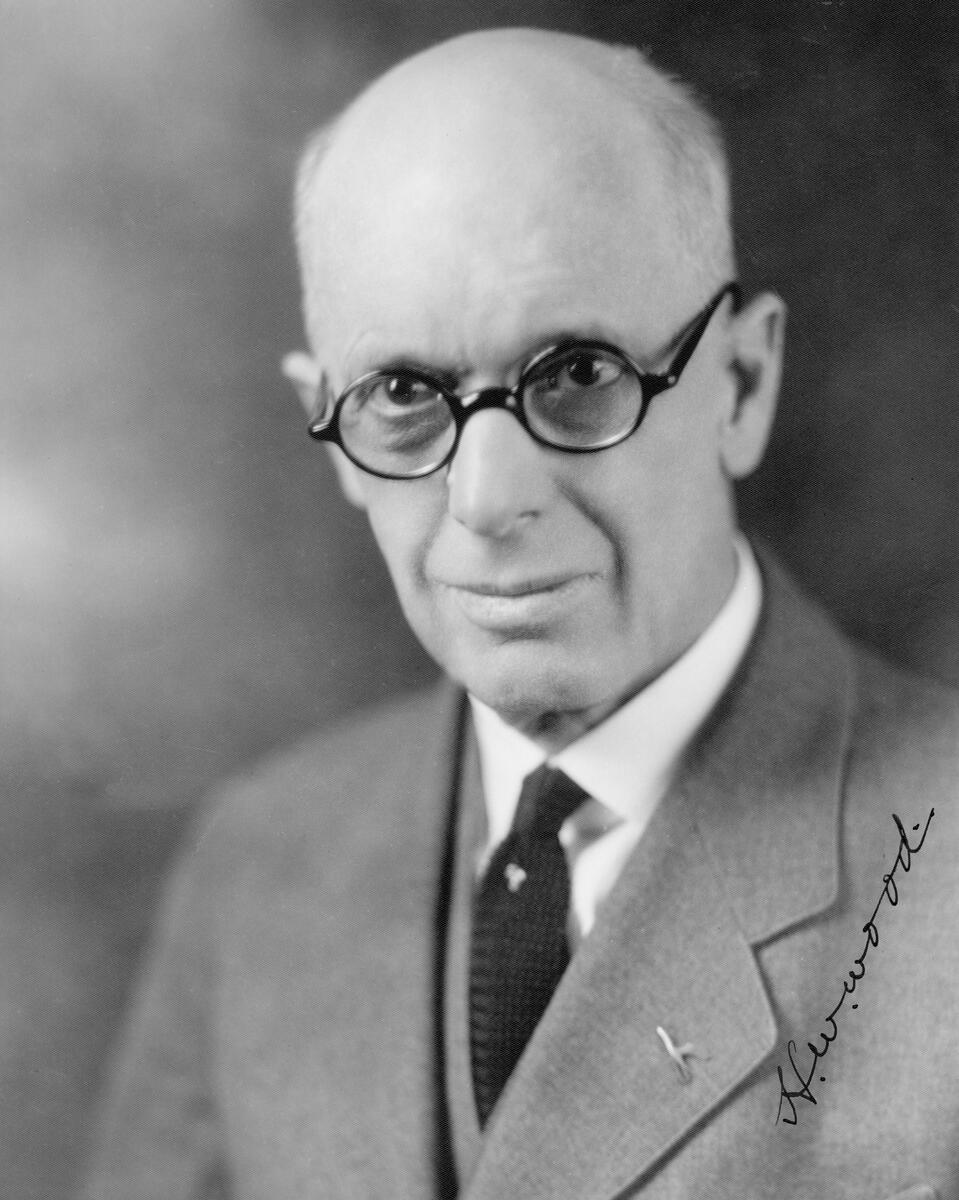
Henry Wise Wood was an important ally of Brownlee's in the UFA.

The Liberals and Conservatives opposed the bill, as did two of the five Labour members. Nor were the UFA members unanimous in the legislation's support: Maurice Conner abstained, and thirteen others—including Archibald Matheson, who had made early attempts to have the bill die on the order paper—were absent for the final vote. Even so, the bill passed by a vote of 31 to 11. The next day, posters appeared along Jasper Avenue advocating the sterilization of George Hoadley, Brownlee's Minister of Health and the bill's sponsor.

=== Relationship with the UFA ===
During the first part of Brownlee's premiership, the presidency of the UFA was still held by his old friend and ally Henry Wise Wood. Wood's considerable influence helped hold in check the organization's more radical elements, who were generally antagonistic to the cautious and conservative Brownlee. Even so, Foster and Byrne suggest that towards the beginning of Brownlee's term, he started to replace Wood as the "centre" of the UFA in a way that Greenfield had not. Despite this, his relationship with the UFA grassroots was sometimes stormy. The 1929 UFA convention saw vocal criticisms of Brownlee's failure to adopt the old age pension and his decision to withdraw the Debt Adjustment Act in the face of opposition from banks. He also rejected the notion, dear to many UFA members, that a UFA government should be bound by the resolutions of the UFA membership. He felt that the heated atmosphere of UFA conventions did not lend itself to the development of prudent policy, and that the government of Alberta ought to be accountable not only to UFA members but to the population at large.

Not helping matters, the UFA, once a populist mass movement, was beginning to lose touch with its grassroots. In advance of the 1926 election, several constituencies had trouble generating the interest necessary for a nomination meeting. While the UFA membership strongly endorsed Baker's proposed educational reforms, it soon emerged that a large majority of farmers opposed them. Such incidents only reinforced Brownlee's disinclination to accept marching orders from UFA convention resolutions.

== Depression and scandal (1930–34) ==
=== 1930 election ===
Brownlee wanted to call an election in 1929 after his government won control of Alberta's natural resources, but could not convince his cabinet or his caucus. Taking advantage of a period of increased popularity to call an early election was considered immoral by many in the UFA, the sort of thing that the old-style parties might try but which the UFA had been elected to hold itself above. As such, an election was not held until June 19, 1930, four years less nine days after the previous one.

Brownlee was the campaign's dominant figure, and gave 67 speeches around the province. He stressed the UFA government's experience and contrasted it with the Liberals' and Conservatives' lack thereof. Having signed the resource agreement, he asked for a mandate to administer its implementation. In response to claims that a strong opposition was needed to exercise a check on his certain-to-be-re-elected government, he restated his view of government as "the administration of business" by saying "an opposition is a thing that is no more needed in the public business of this Province ... than in the management of the affairs of any of our large corporations." Byrne suggests that Brownlee arrived at this belief rationally but, once he had done so, "adhered to [it] with an almost religious conviction".

The election gave the UFA a slightly reduced majority, with 39 of the legislature's 63 seats. Labour candidates, on behalf of many of whom Brownlee campaigned, won a further four. The Liberals remained the official opposition with eleven members, while the Conservatives returned six. The remaining three seats were won by independent candidates.

=== Collapse of agricultural prices ===
In the 1920s and 1930s, Alberta's economy was heavily reliant on wheat, and in 1930 the price of wheat began to fall drastically. From its peak of $1.78 per bushel in summer 1929, by February 1930 it had fallen to $1.07 because of world oversupply and dumping by the Soviet Union and Argentina. By March it had reached $1.00, a level at which most Alberta wheat farmers could not profit. By the fall, it had fallen below $0.60 and by the end of the year to $0.45. Other agricultural products, especially cattle, poultry, and eggs, saw similar or greater price decreases.

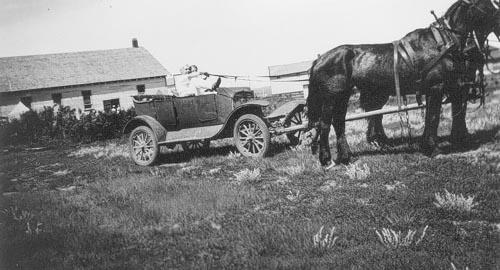
As the depression worsened, "Bennett buggies" became a common sight. Cars with their engines removed because their owners couldn't afford gas, they were named after the increasingly unpopular Prime Minister.

In February 1930 Brownlee advocated a federally guaranteed minimum price to farmers of $0.70 per bushel of wheat. In November he asked new Prime Minister R. B. Bennett, with whom he had practiced law in Calgary nearly twenty years previous, to stabilize wheat "at some reasonable price". Bennett replied that price decreases were inevitable in the face of a global oversupply of 400 million bushels. Brownlee also sought assistance from Bennett in dealing with banks' increasing reluctance to lend money to farmers, many of whom would not be able to purchase seed for the 1931 crop without loans. Brownlee himself offered such farmers limited assistance, but only quietly and only in the last resort; he was concerned that a well-publicized and widespread program of loan guarantees would induce banks to lend money under predatory terms, knowing that if the farmers could not make the repayments the province would. When he reluctantly agreed to guarantee banks' loans to farmers for binder twine, he insisted that these guarantees be kept secret to discourage farmers from shifting loans that they could pay off themselves to the provincial government. To address the problem of farmers being forced to pledge one third of their crop as security on loans, he threatened to implement legislation capping such crop share guarantees at one quarter. As he had hoped, this threat enhanced lenders' willingness to negotiate with his government for less radical solutions; these eventually included caps that applied only in low yield areas of the province and an agreement to give three to four weeks notice before initiating foreclosures and to initiate them only where farmers' payments did not even cover interest. Despite these minor successes, Brownlee's strategy of negotiation and relying on the reasonableness of all parties rather than imposing strong legislation left his popularity among farmers diminished. It was not enhanced when he supported unpopular federal legislation requiring farmers to plant less wheat, part of an international agreement aimed at addressing worldwide oversupply.

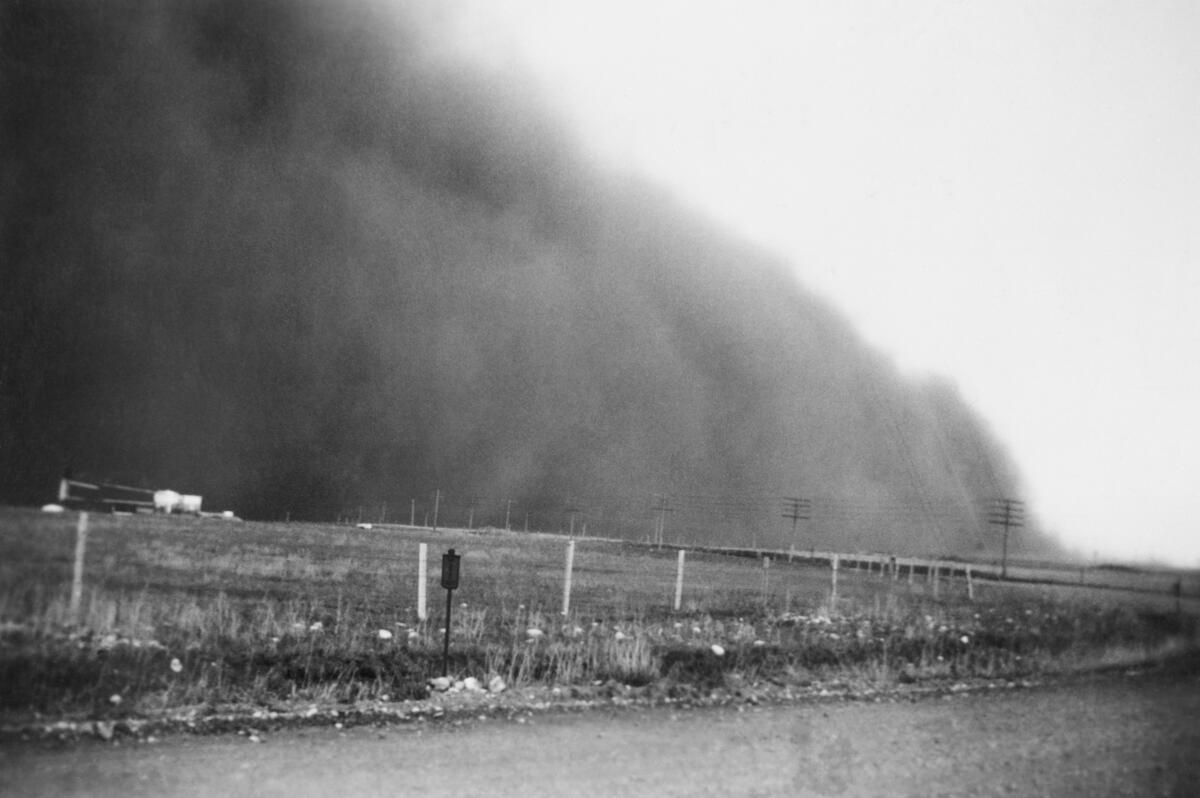
Conditions during the "Dirty Thirties" sometimes gave rise to dust storms, such as this July 1933 storm near Okotoks.

A second consequence of collapsing wheat prices was the threat they posed to the Alberta Wheat Pool (AWP). Falling prices and the attendant tightened credit conditions led the Pool, along with its counterparts in Saskatchewan and Manitoba, to seek help from its provincial government in 1930. Brownlee guaranteed loans to the Pool, but told the legislature that he did not expect this guarantee to prove necessary, since the large portions of the 1929 crop already sold at higher prices would provide sufficient cushioning unless wheat prices fell "to a level never reached on Canadian markets". In October 1930, with the Pool receiving a price for its wheat well below the $1.00 per bushel that it guaranteed its farmers, the banks refused to lend more money unless the Pool appointed to its Central Selling Agency (CSA) a general manager acceptable to the banks. Brownlee and Premiers John Bracken of Manitoba and James Thomas Milton Anderson of Saskatchewan met in Ottawa with acting Prime Minister Sir George Perley, seeking direct federal aid to the Pools. The premiers' pleas rejected, CSA President Alexander James McPhail offered the banks the names of two possible general managers. The first was John McFarland, former president of the Alberta Pacific Grain Company. The second was Brownlee. The banks chose McFarland. Brownlee too imposed conditions on the AWP as a condition of provincial assistance: he wanted the provincial government to be consulted on all AWP managerial decisions and given the right to veto capital expenditures, and he required it to increase its sales commission from three quarters of a cent per bushel to one cent. While these conditions met with resistance from farmer leaders who believed that they would transform the AWP from a farmers' organization to a grain company like any other, Brownlee was supported by UFA President Henry Wise Wood, the AWP was reliant on provincial support, and the conditions were accepted.

=== Urban unemployment ===
The effects of the Great Depression were not felt only on Alberta's farms. By the winter of 1930–1931, unemployment in Edmonton and Calgary was at record levels, which were only exacerbated by a migration of farmers' offspring, hoping to find work, to the cities. Brownlee, who had long advocated curtailed immigration to the western provinces, urged the federal government to prevent new migrants from swelling the ranks of Alberta's unemployed. He also asked that it shoulder a greater share of ever-rising relief payments; by 1932, it started to do so.

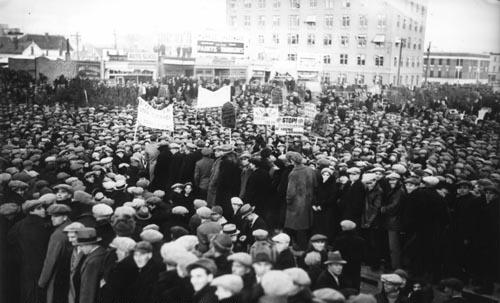
The hunger march in Edmonton, December 1932

Unemployment bred labour militancy. In December 1930, Brownlee asked John Lymburn, his attorney-general, to prepare a list of known communist leaders so he could arrange for their deportation where possible. He staunchly opposed the activities of organizations that he viewed as communist, including the Ukrainian Labour Farmer Temple Association and the Farmers' Unity League. In December 1932, labour organizers staged a "Hunger March", at which 1,000 unemployed met in Edmonton's Market Square and marched to the legislature building. Brownlee refused to grant permission for the march and requested and received police assistance in breaking it up. While he pronounced himself willing to meet with a delegation of the march's leaders, he believed that the atmosphere at the march would be dangerously volatile and refused to address it. One participant said "A lot of us understood that [Brownlee] couldn't do too much, but we figured since it's a farmers' government, least he can do is come out and explain. But they wouldn't let us near the Parliament Building."

=== Deteriorating provincial finances ===
The shrinking provincial economy and increasing relief payments brought about the return of public deficits to Alberta. Brownlee, a fiscal conservative in good times, became still more aggressive in cutting spending. In 1931 the government closed all but two of the province's agricultural colleges, the creation of which by the Liberal government of Arthur Sifton had been a major UFA victory. The civil service shrank from 2,566 at the beginning of 1930 to 1,600 at the end of 1931. Government spending on advertising fell from $36,000 in 1929 to less than $8,000 in 1932. In 1932 the government disbanded the Alberta Provincial Police and asked the Royal Canadian Mounted Police to take over policing in the province. The same year, government employees earning more than $100 per month took 10% pay cuts; in Brownlee's case, this translated into an annual reduction of nearly $1,500.

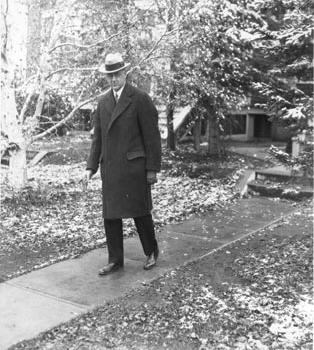
Brownlee leaving his home in 1930

Brownlee's government also took action to increase government revenues: the 1932 budget increased corporate taxes and imposed a new personal income tax on individuals earning more than $750 per year and couples earning more than $1,500; fewer than 100 farmers in the province earned enough to pay it. In 1933 he joined Bracken and Anderson in protesting to Bennett that nothing more could be done: in Brownlee's view, the province's impoverished people could not pay more taxes, and yet expectations of provincial governments were constantly growing. Left to their own devices, the premiers said, they would have to either drastically cut relief payments or default on debt payments. They asked that the federal government increase its share of unemployment relief from one third to one half and that it lend the provinces the money they needed to pay their share. Bennett replied by chastising the premiers for not doing enough to "work into a position of self-reliance" and decreed that federal support would be cut off unless budget deficits were limited to $1 million. In a separate letter to Brownlee, he praised him for doing "better than any one of the Western Provinces" but said that, in the interests of equality, he was imposing the same conditions on Alberta as on the others.

Despite Brownlee's efforts, Alberta's budgetary position worsened. In 1931 the government ran a deficit of $2.5 million, the first of Brownlee's premiership; 1932's deficit surpassed $4 million. Also in 1932, the Alberta government came within hours of defaulting on a $3 million bond, and was saved only by a loan from the federal government. Over the longer-term, it funded its operations by a $15 million issue at record interest rates; even this was taken up only because of guarantees from the federal government.

=== Political radicalism ===
Henry Wise Wood declined to seek re-election as UFA President at its 1931 convention, and was replaced by Robert Gardiner. In contrast to Wood, Gardiner was firmly entrenched on the progressive movement's left-wing. He denounced Brownlee's approach to economic policy, saying that his austerity only exacerbated the problem of underconsumption. Under Gardiner, the UFA moved increasingly to the left, well out of step with the Brownlee government, and passed resolutions calling for the nationalization of land, radio broadcasting, and hydroelectricity, along with the cancellation of interest payments as long as the price of agricultural commodities was less than the cost of their production. In 1932, prominent UFA members—including MP William Irvine—attended the founding convention of the Co-operative Commonwealth Federation in Calgary. This new federal party advocated socialism and considered itself a partnership between farmers and labourers; Brownlee wanted no part of its policies.

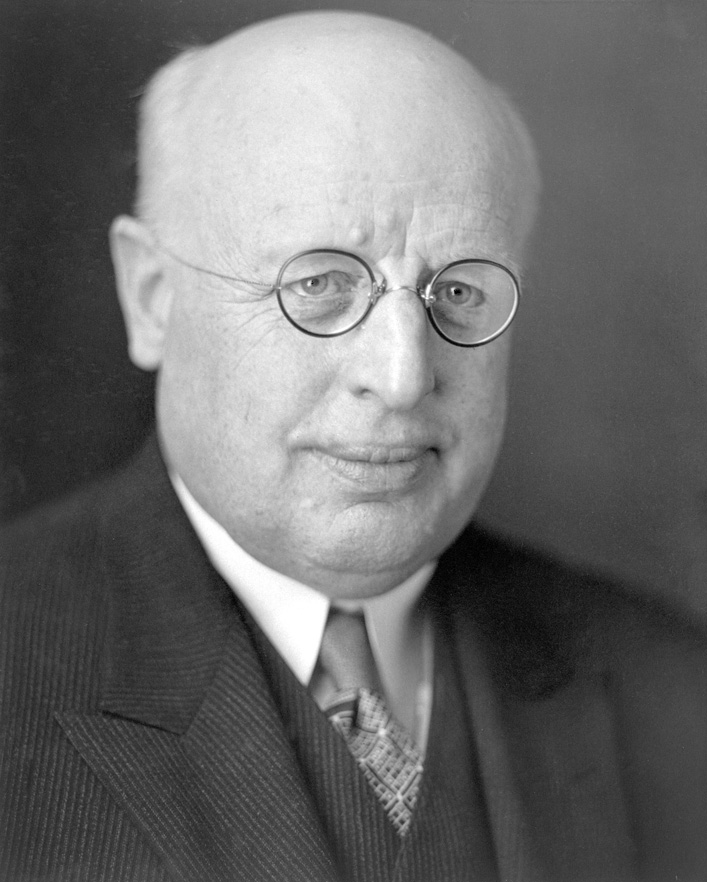
Evangelist William Aberhart's social credit theories gained popularity towards the end of Brownlee's premiership.

At around the same time, Calgary radio evangelist William Aberhart began to preach a new economic theory called social credit. Though the theory required control of monetary policy, a federal responsibility, it became increasingly popular among former UFA supporters who, following Aberhart's instructions, began to form local social credit "study groups". Brownlee argued against social credit on the basis that its application by a provincial government would be unconstitutional and that it would do nothing to create markets for Alberta's unsold wheat, which he viewed as the source of Alberta's woes. The legislature held a series of hearings to investigate the theory, and both Aberhart and C. H. Douglas, the theory's originator, testified at them. Brownlee questioned both on how the introduction of "credit certificates" issued by the Alberta government could help people so heavily dependent on interprovincial and international trade; neither answered the question to his satisfaction.

In defending his conservatism, Brownlee emphasized that "history has yet to record a single instance of the revolutionary method that has not resulted in a welter of discord and misery" and mused that "if the results were not so tragical, [sic] I would like to see Canada put under the most extreme form of socialistic or communistic Government in order that our people could have the actual experience of what would happen and learn for themselves the lesson that in our present day world situation, one nation cannot fashion for itself any level of prosperity regardless of the position of the rest of the world". Even as he rejected the radical solutions posed by others, Brownlee had no solutions of his own to offer but government thrift and moderate debt adjustment.

=== Royal commission ===
While Brownlee was viewed as an orthodox conservative in his approach to economic matters within Alberta, elsewhere in Canada he was still regarded as a leader of the country's radical farmer movement. Accordingly, when Bennett struck a royal commission to examine the government's role in economic and monetary management, he asked Brownlee to serve on it as a representative of Western and unorthodox views. Though he was concerned that the commission's other two Canadian members, Beaudry Leman and William Thomas White, were involved in the banking industry, Brownlee agreed to the appointment. He was formally appointed with the rest of the members July 31, 1933, and the commission began its work in Ottawa on August 8.

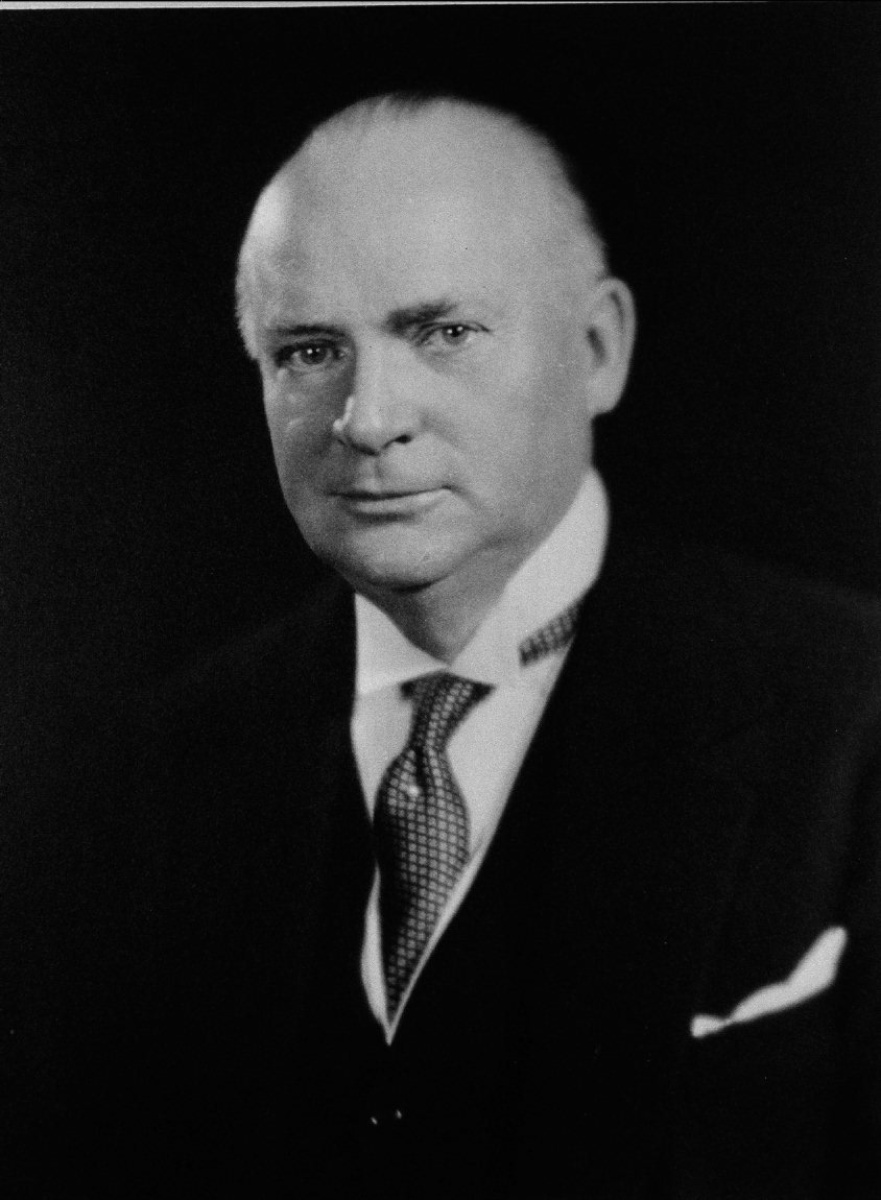
Brownlee was appointed to the royal commission by his old principal R. B. Bennett.

The royal commission conducted hearings across the country. In Victoria, Brownlee questioned witnesses on how poverty among prairie farmers was hurting British Columbia's lumber and salmon packing industries. In Calgary he drew testimony from farmers that farming conditions were excellent—in contrast with the wide belief in eastern Canada that western farmers' troubles were caused by drought and land unsuited for agriculture—and that the problem was "not due to Acts of God but to Acts of Man".

The UFA's submission, presented in Calgary by Gardiner, emphasized these points and accused the banks of charging predatory interest rates. It called on the commission to recommend a government-owned central bank and controls on interest, and concluded that "the monetary system has failed". Brownlee himself wrote the Alberta government's submission, though it was presented at the commission's Edmonton hearings by Acting Premier George Hoadley. It echoed the UFA's points about interest rates and the importance of a government-owned central bank, and accused the banks of treating the west unequally to the east. The commission concluded its hearings in Ottawa in September, where representatives of the banks testified. Brownlee criticized them for "discounting", a practice whereby banks charged higher de facto interest rates than the legal maximum by requiring loan recipients to consent to having a portion of their loan withheld.

The commission's report, issued September 29, recommended the establishment of a central bank and an inquiry on the availability of credit to farmers. Brownlee supported both recommendations, and attached a minority report calling for banks to end their disparate treatment of eastern and western debtors, urging that a statutory maximum interest rate be maintained and possibly lowered, and recommending that the proposed central bank be entirely government owned and controlled. This last recommendation came to pass in 1938, when the Bank of Canada, originally controlled by a mix of public and private interests, was reorganized as a federal Crown corporation.

=== Political intrigue ===
Provincially, Brownlee had always enjoyed better relations with the Conservatives than the Liberals. A. A. McGillivray, Conservative leader from 1925 until 1929, was a friend of his, as was his successor David Duggan. The Liberals despised Brownlee and the UFA, and in 1932 selected William R. Howson, one of their most militant MLAs, as leader. Howson was aggressive in trying to uncover evidence of scandal and malfeasance, including the sensational divorce of Oran McPherson. He was aided in these attacks by the unabashedly Liberal Edmonton Bulletin, which distributed free copies of issues containing coverage of the divorce in McPherson's southern Little Bow riding. As the depression and, later, Brownlee's sex scandal took their toll on Brownlee's government, Howson was certain that he would imminently become premier.

Brownlee's relations with the federal parties were somewhat more harmonious. While he personally preferred the Liberals, his history with Bennett led to a cordial working relationship. Both parties made overtures towards Brownlee: King had invited him to join his cabinet while he was still attorney-general, and in 1932 sent an emissary to encourage union of all political parties opposed to the Conservatives. Brownlee reiterated his policy to deal "equally with Liberals and Conservatives in Ottawa", and declined King's overtures. So too did Alberta Liberals, led by Howson and Charles Stewart, who sought to replace Brownlee rather than join with him. In 1934, the Conservatives sent H. R. Milner to raise the possibility of the UFA and the Conservatives joining together against the Liberals and Co-operative Commonwealth Federation; Brownlee expressed interest, but made no move to enact such a coalition. A frustrated Bennett dismissed him as "a time server whose one object, apparently, is to retain office."

=== Sex scandal ===
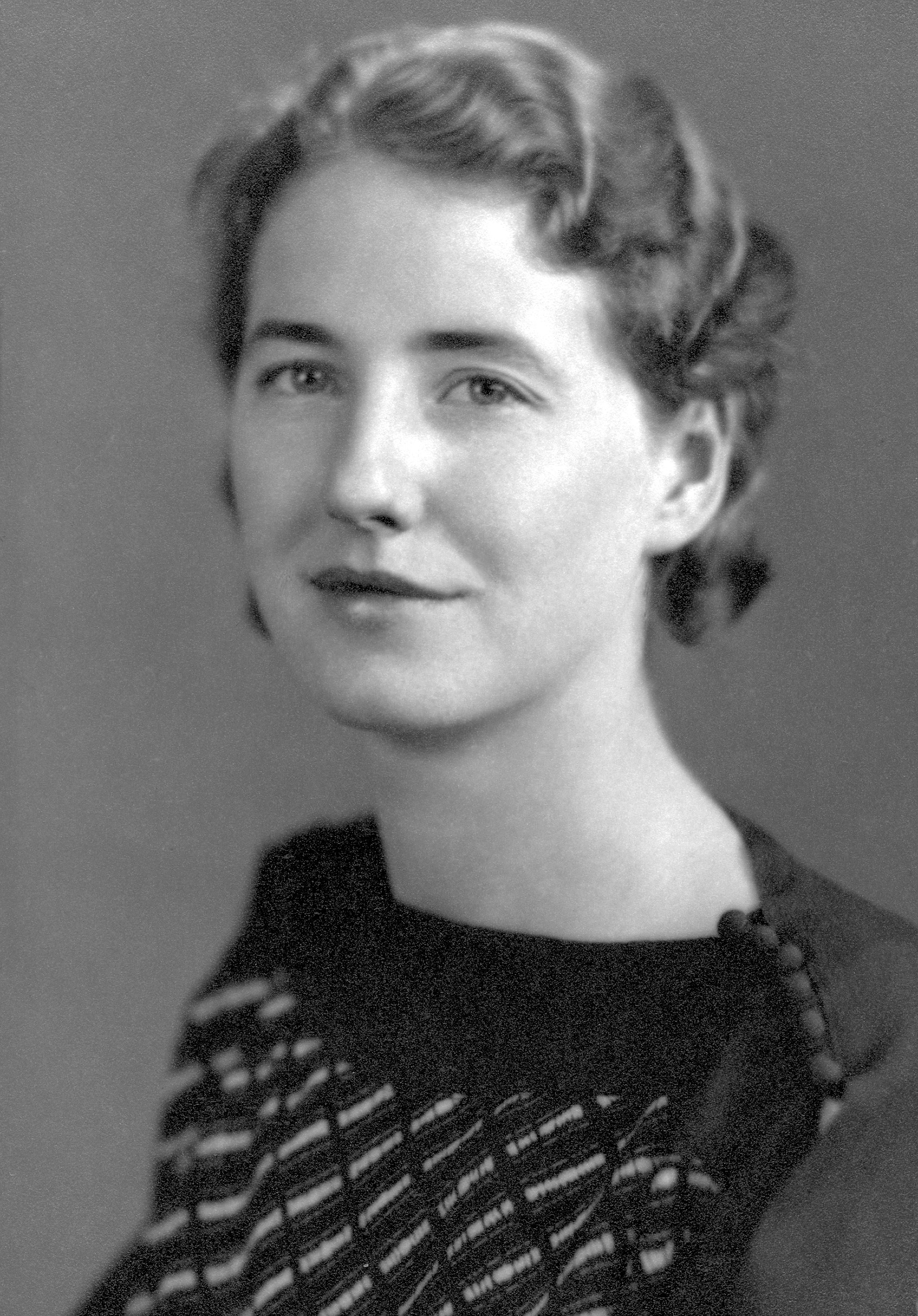
Vivian MacMillan, whom Brownlee was accused of seducing

On September 22, 1933, Liberal lawyer Neil MacLean filed a statement of claim on behalf of Vivian MacMillan and her father Allan MacMillan, suing Brownlee for the seduction of Vivian. It alleged that Brownlee had lured her to Edmonton from her home in Edson in 1930 with the promise of a job in the provincial attorney-general's office. Upon her arrival, she had become a close friend of the family's. One night Brownlee had told her that because of his wife Florence's ill health, they were unable to have a sexual relationship, and that MacMillan must yield to him to prevent him from resuming a sexual relationship with Florence that would likely kill her. MacMillan had eventually yielded, and the ensuing affair lasted until July 1933. Brownlee denied MacMillan's story completely and counter-sued MacMillan and her fiance, John Caldwell, for conspiracy.

A sensational trial ensued in June 1934, which was reported in lurid detail by the Bulletin. Despite Brownlee's exposure of contradictions in MacMillan's story, the jury found in favour of the plaintiffs and awarded Vivian $10,000 and her father $5,000. Trial judge William Carlos Ives disagreed with the jury's finding and ruled that even if Vivian MacMillan's story had been true, as a matter of law there could be no successful suit for seduction without damages being proved. He overturned the jury's finding and ruled in Brownlee's favour. The case was eventually appealed to the Judicial Committee of the British Privy Council, at the time Canada's highest court of appeal, which found in favour of the plaintiffs.

The legal processes and arguments were irrelevant to John Brownlee's political career: as soon as the jury found that he had seduced Vivian MacMillan, he announced that he would resign as premier as soon as a successor could be found. On July 10, 1934, he was succeeded as Premier of Alberta by Richard Gavin Reid.

== See also ==
- Great Depression in Canada
