= Frederick Jamieson =

Canadian politician

Frederick Charles Jamieson KC

Member of the Legislative Assembly of Alberta
- In office January 9, 1931 – August 22, 1935
- Constituency: Edmonton
- Preceded by: Charles Weaver
- Succeeded by: Samuel Barnes, David Mullen, Gerald O'Connor and George Van Allen

Personal details
- Born: May 18, 1875 North Gower, Ontario
- Died: October 4, 1966 (aged 91) Edmonton, Alberta
- Party: Conservative
- Spouse: Anne Virginia Catherine McLeod
- Children: Kenneth Richard Jamieson
- Occupation: politician

Military service
- Rank: Colonel

Frederick Charles Jamieson (May 18, 1875 – October 4, 1966) was a provincial politician, lawyer, and veteran from Alberta, Canada. He served as a member of the Legislative Assembly of Alberta from 1931 until 1935 sitting with the Conservative caucus in opposition. Jamieson was a veteran of the Second Boer War and the First World War and achieved the rank of lieutenant colonel. He died at age 91 on October 4, 1966.

== Early life ==
Jamieson was born on May 18, 1875, in North Gower, Ontario, the sixth child of James and Mary Jamieson. After attending local schools, he taught in Fallowfield, Ontario, for two years.

In 1895, Jamieson moved with his family to Lacombe, Alberta, to homestead before relocating to Strathcona to article under Alexander Cameron Rutherford in 1899. In 1902, he married Anne Virginia Catherine McLeod, the sister of politician Kenneth McLeod. In 1905, Anne gave birth to the couple's only son, Kenneth Richard Jamieson.

== Professional Life ==
=== Military career ===
On December 30, 1899, Jamieson enlisted for service in South Africa. He was discharged upon his return to Edmonton in January 1901. Jamieson would later join the independent squadrons of Canadian Mounted Rifles that would later form the 19th Alberta Mounted Rifles. When the First World War broke out, Jamieson was appointed as commanding officer of the 1st Special Service Squadron of the 19th Alberta Dragoons. He served in France and Belgium from 1914 until 1916 with the 19th Alberta Dragoons, when he was recalled for staff duty. In 1916, Jamieson was appointed to the British Canadian Recruiting Mission in the United States, which aimed to encourage Americans to join the war. In 1918, he assumed command of the 260th Battalion and later served in Siberia in 1919. Following his return in 1919, Jamieson continued to practice with Canadian reservists, eventually commanding the Edmonton Garrison as Brigade Commander of the 79th Infantry Brigade. During the Second World War, he established and served with the Veterans Volunteer Reserves in Edmonton.

=== Legal career ===
Jamieson led a successful career as a lawyer in Edmonton, Alberta. He joined the law firm of Alexander Cameron Rutherford, Alberta's first premier, on August 7, 1899, creating the partnership of Rutherford and Jamieson. Rutherford and Jamieson continued as partners until Jamieson formed his own firm in 1925. He served as the solicitor for the city of Strathcona from 1905 to 1912 (succeeding Rutherford), when the city of Strathcona was amalgamated with Edmonton. He continued to practice law in Edmonton until 1962.

=== Political career ===
Jamieson ran unsuccessfully for a seat to the Alberta Legislature in 1926 and 1930. Jamieson was elected during a by-election held on January 9, 1931, as a Conservative candidate in the electoral district of Edmonton. He faced three other high-profile opponents including former MLA John Bowen and Elmer Roper. On election night Jamieson won the seat on the third vote to hold it for the Conservatives.

Jamieson ran for a second term in the 1935 Alberta general election but was defeated finishing in fourteenth place on the first vote count.

=== Later Life and Honors ===
Jamieson continued to practice law in Edmonton until the 1970s. Outside of his legal work, he was an active member of the Historical Society of Alberta , serving in various capacities with the organization, including on the executive committee, as vice-president, as honorary vice-president. He also wrote extensively for the Historical Society of Alberta's history journal, the Alberta Historical Review, now Alberta History.

In 1919, Jamieson was appointed to the King's Counsel. In recognition of his decades of legal service, he was presented with a lifetime membership to the Edmonton Bar Association in 1953.
