= William Albert Atkinson =

Canadian politician

Member of the Legislative Assembly of Alberta
- In office June 19, 1930 – August 22, 1935
- Preceded by: Warren Prevey
- Succeeded by: Samuel Barnes, David Mullen, Gerald O'Connor and George Van Allen
- Constituency: Edmonton

Personal details
- Born: May 18, 1876 Guthrie, Ontario
- Died: April 29, 1948 (aged 71)
- Party: Conservative
- Occupation: politician

William Albert Atkinson (1876-1948) was a provincial politician from Alberta, Canada. He served as a member of the Legislative Assembly of Alberta from 1930 to 1935 sitting with the Conservative caucus in opposition.

== Political career ==
Atkinson ran for a seat to the Alberta Legislature in the 1930 Alberta general election in the Edmonton electoral district. Although not a winning candidate in the first count, the election used single transferrable voting so he picked up enough later votes to take the last open seat to be elected.

Atkinson ran for a second term in office. He came in eleventh place on the first vote count and was unable to win enough vote transfers to take a seat this time.
