= Gerald O'Connor =

Canadian politician

C. Gerald O'Connor KC
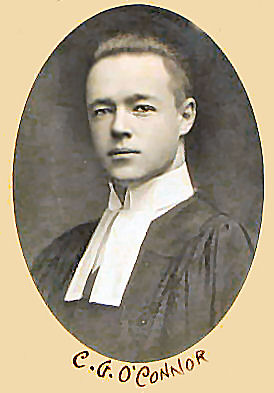

Member of the Legislative Assembly of Alberta
- In office August 22, 1935 – March 20, 1940
- Constituency: Edmonton

Personal details
- Born: December 3, 1890 Walkerton, Ontario
- Died: November 16, 1949 (aged 58) Ottawa, Ontario
- Party: Liberal
- Spouse: Victoria Smith
- Relatives: George Bligh O'Connor (1883-1956) (Brother); George Hamilton (Great-grandfather)
- Education: Osgoode Hall Law School
- Occupation: lawyer, judge

Military service
- Allegiance: Canada
- Branch/service: Canadian Expeditionary Force
- Rank: Captain
- Unit: 138th Battalion
- Battles/wars: First World War

Charles Gerald O'Connor KC (December 3, 1890 – November 16, 1949) was a provincial politician and judge from Alberta, Canada. He served as a member of the Legislative Assembly of Alberta from 1935 to 1940, sitting with the Liberal caucus in government. He also served on the Edmonton City Council in 1931 and 1932 and a federal court judge.

== Early life ==
Charles Gerald O'Connor was born December 3, 1890, at Walkerton, Ontario, to Frederick Shepherd O'Connor, a lawyer in Walkerton and later Sheriff of Bruce County, and Maria Isabella O'Connor (née Hamilton), the granddaughter of George Hamilton, the founder of Hamilton, Ontario. He was educated in Edmonton and attended Osgoode Hall Law School at York University. He joined his older brother George Bligh O'Connor and his partner William Antrobus Griesbach to form the legal firm Griesback, O'Connor & O'Connor.

O'Connor enlisted in the 138th Battalion of the Canadian Expeditionary Force during the First World War, serving as a lieutenant. He served in France and was wounded at the Battle of Passchendaele. O'Connor briefly returned to Edmonton in 1918, then returned to the front as the Aide-de-camp to Major General Archibald Cameron Macdonell, and was amongst the forces which marched into Germany at the end of the war. O'Connor left the war as a captain.

He married Victoria Smith on September 5, 1920, and together had two children.

== Political life ==
=== Edmonton City Council ===
O'Conner was elected to Edmonton City Council for a two-year term in the 1930 Edmonton municipal election as a member of the Civic Government Association.

=== Member of the Legislative Assembly of Alberta ===
O'Connor was elected to the 8th Alberta Legislature in the 1935 Alberta general election for the Edmonton electoral district. O'Connor was one of six members returned from the district through the single transferable vote, and although he finished the first round of balloting with 1,116 votes, good enough for 12th of 27 candidates, the subsequent counts through vote transfers saw O'Connor elected. He joined William R. Howson and George Van Allen as the elected Liberal members.

O'Connor ran for re-election in 1940 as a member of the Independent Movement, a collation of opposition parties against the Social Credit movement. O'Conner was not reelected, receiving 3,392 votes, while fellow Independent Movement candidates John Percy Page, Hugh John Macdonald, and David Milwyn Duggan were elected. Future Premier Ernest Manning and Socred Norman B. James were also elected in Edmonton.

== Judicial career ==
O'Connor was appointed a Justice of the Exchequer Court of Canada at Ottawa, appointed Puisne Judge on April 19, 1945, until his death on November 16, 1949.

== Family ==
Gerald's older brother George Bligh O'Connor (1883-1956) was appointed to the Supreme Court of Alberta, and later served as Chief Justice.
