= George Van Allen =

Canadian politician

George Van Allen KC

Member of the Legislative Assembly of Alberta
- In office August 22, 1935 – June 15, 1937
- Constituency: Edmonton

Personal details
- Born: June 22, 1890 Morrisburg, Ontario, Canada
- Died: June 15, 1937 (aged 46) Rochester, Minnesota, United States
- Party: Liberal
- Spouse: Ruby Thomer
- Children: 4
- Education: University of Alberta
- Occupation: lawyer

George Harold Van Allen KC (June 22, 1890 – June 15, 1937) was a Canadian provincial politician from Alberta. He served as a member of the Legislative Assembly of Alberta from 1935 to his death in 1937, sitting with the Liberal caucus in government.

== Early life ==
George Harold Van Allen was born June 22, 1890, at Crysler's Farm in Morrisburg, Ontario to Wilbur Van Allen and Florence Louise Hayunga, descended from United Empire Loyalists. Van Allen attended Morrisburg High School and was educated to become a teacher. He moved to Lethbridge in 1912 to become a principal, and soon after relocated to Edmonton to attend the University of Alberta where he completed his Bachelor of Laws. Van Allen was admitted to the bar in 1915, formed his own practice in 1919 and was named King's Counsel in 1929. He married Ruby Thomer on December 23, 1926, and together had three sons and one daughter. Van Allen served as government counsel during the Royal Commission on Grain Freight Rates in 1923–1924, and as the President of the Edmonton Chamber of Commerce in 1928-1929.

== Political life ==
George Van Allen was elected to the 8th Alberta Legislature in the district of Edmonton in the 1935 Alberta general election. Van Allen was one of six candidates elected for the district, which included two other Liberals in William R. Howson and Gerald O'Connor. As an MLA, Van Allen focused his attention on the state of the agricultural industry and was concerned with the Social Credit economic policies. Van Allen contracted the flu in the autumn of 1936 that developed into pneumonia. He sought treatment in California and Minnesota until his death at the Mayo Clinic in Rochester, Minnesota, part way through his term in office on June 15, 1937, at the age of 46.
