= William R. Howson =

Canadian politician (1883–1952)

William Robinson Howson
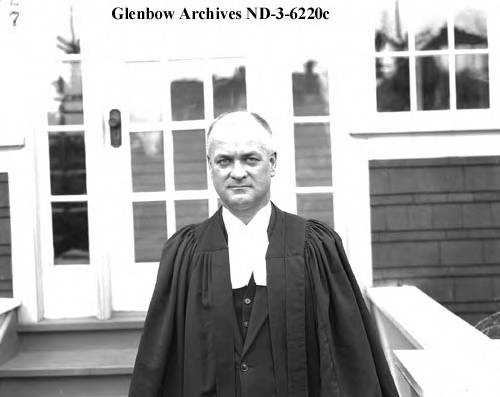
- Howson in 1932

Member of the Legislative Assembly of Alberta
- In office June 19, 1930 – 1936
- Preceded by: David Duggan, Charles Gibbs, John Lymburn, Warren Prevey and Charles Weaver
- Succeeded by: Walter Morrish
- Constituency: Edmonton

Leader of the Alberta Liberal Party
- In office 1932 – March 2, 1936
- Preceded by: George Webster
- Succeeded by: Edward Gray

Personal details
- Born: March 6, 1883 Norwood, Ontario
- Died: June 25, 1952 (aged 69)
- Party: Liberal
- Occupation: politician, judge, debt collector, soldier banker and real estate agent

Military service
- Allegiance: Canada
- Branch/service: Royal Canadian Army
- Years of service: 1916–1918
- Battles/wars: World War I

William Robinson Howson (March 6, 1883 – June 25, 1952) was a politician, judge, debt collector, soldier, banker, and real estate agent from Alberta, Canada. He served as a Liberal member of the Legislative Assembly of Alberta from 1930 to 1936. He led the Liberal caucus in opposition and the party from 1932 to 1936.

== Early life ==
William Robinson Howson was born in Norwood, Ontario on March 6, 1883, to William R. Howson and Anna Johnston. Howson would be educated in Norwood and attend undergraduate school near Peterborough. He worked as a high school teacher in Mathers Corners and in 1906 became a bank manager for the Sovereign Bank of Stirling, and in 1908, the Bank of Montreal.

He moved to Alberta in 1910 and settled eventually settled in Edmonton after stints as a bill collector in Sedgewick, Alberta and as a real estate agent in Calgary. He attended the University of Alberta, receiving a Bachelor of Arts degree in 1915 and a Bachelor of Laws degree in 1916, where he was awarded the gold medal in Law upon graduation. Howson would article with Alexander Grant MacKay and was admitted to the Law Society of Alberta on January 11, 1916.

He served with the Royal Canadian Army in France during World War I from 1916 until the end of the war in 1918 as a Sergeant with the Tank Corps. He returned to the practice of law in Edmonton with Parlee, Freeman, and Howson, and eventually becoming King's Counselor in 1935.

== Political career ==
Howson ran for a seat to the Alberta legislature in the 1930 Alberta provincial election. He stood as a Liberal candidate in the Edmonton electoral district. He won the fourth place seat out of seven to earn his first term in the Legislature.

Howson became leader of the Alberta Liberal Party in 1932 and led it in the 1935 provincial election. The Liberal party despite having success prior to the election enticing two members to cross the floor ended up losing seven seats but keeping official opposition status. Howson held his seat finishing in the top three seats after obtaining the vote threshold on the first count.

Howson resigned his seat and as party leader a year later on March 2, 1936, after being appointed to replace John Boyle on the Supreme Court of Alberta.

== Judicial career ==
Howson was appointed by the federal Liberal government Justice Minister Ernest Lapointe to sit on the Alberta Supreme Court Trial Division in 1936, the Appellate Division in 1942, and became chief justice of the trial division in 1944 serving until approximately a month before his death on June 25, 1952.

Howson presided over German prisoner of war trials in Medicine Hat including the infamous case where POW Karl Lehman a suspected sympathizer with Operation Valkyrie was beaten and hanged by four fellow POWs on September 10, 1944. Bruno Perzonowsky, Walter Wolf, Heinrich Busch and Willi Mueller were hanged in Lethbridge, Alberta along with convicted murder Donald Sherman Staley on July 24, 1946, in what would be the largest mass hanging since the North-West Rebellion.

On June 5, 1937, while presiding over the sentencing of convicted arsonist Stanley Blozak Howson would witness Blozak commit suicide by swallowing strychnine in the court room and later die in hospital. Prior to his suicide Blozak would profess his innocence and allege he did not receive a fair trial as Blozak was a Socred and Howson was Liberal, and by committing suicide Blozak would avoid the three-year sentence handed down by Howson.

From 1950 to 1951 Howson would hear the case of Oil City Petroleums v. American Leduc Petroleums, which would become the last appeal to go from Alberta to the Judicial Committee of the Privy Council.

Ponoka-Calmar_Oils_v_Wakefield was actually the last case from to be decided in the Judicial Committee of the Privy Council on appeal from the Dominion of Canada (1867-1982).
