= Walter Morrish =

Canadian politician

Member of the Legislative Assembly of Alberta
- In office 1936–1940
- Constituency: Edmonton

Personal details
- Born: October 19, 1890 Devon, England
- Died: January 30, 1974 (aged 83) Edmonton, Alberta, Canada
- Party: Liberal
- Occupation: lawyer

Walter Morrish (October 19, 1890 – January 30, 1974) was a provincial politician from Alberta, Canada. He served as a Liberal member of the Legislative Assembly of Alberta from 1936 to 1940.

He was elected in a by-election in 1936, held in Edmonton.
