= 1922 Edmonton municipal election =

Municipal election in Alberta, Canada

The 1922 municipal election was held December 11, 1922 to elect a mayor and six aldermen to sit on Edmonton City Council and three trustees to sit on the public school board. R Crossland, P M Dunne, Joseph Gariépy, and J J Murray were acclaimed to two-year terms on the separate school board.

There were ten aldermen on city council, but four of the positions were already filled: Ambrose Bury, James East, Thomas Malone, and Charles Weaver were all elected to two-year terms in 1921 and were still in office. Bickerton Pratt had also been elected to a two-year term in 1921, but had resigned in order to run for mayor. Accordingly, Valentine Richards was elected to a one-year term.

There were seven trustees on the public school board, but four of the positions were already filled: Samuel Barnes, Ralph Bellamy, Frank Scott, and Frank Crang had all been elected to two-year terms in 1921 and were still in office. The same was true on the separate board, where F A French, Paul Jenvrin, Thomas Magee, and Joseph Henri Picard were continuing.

The six candidates for mayor were a record high to date.

For the aldermanic election, each voter could cast up to six votes (Block Voting.

The 1922 election saw the defeat of the first woman elected to city council. Izena Ross had been elected to a one-year term in 1921, and ran for re-election but finished eighth. She received more votes than she had in 1921 but this time was not elected. It would be 1933 before voters would elect another woman.

This would be the last election of aldermen that would be conducted under the at-large Block Voting system until 1928. Voters in this election voted to replace the system with Single transferable voting (STV), a form of Proportional representation that had been used in Calgary city elections since 1917. The first Edmonton municipal election to use the new system was held in December 1923. James East and other Labour aldermen were supportive of the move to adopt STV. Citizens League councillors Izena Ross and Bickerton Pratt had surprised many when they too endorsed holding a referendum on the proposal.

== Voter turnout ==
Out of 20,403 eligible voters, 10,923 cast ballots, for a voter turnout of 53.5%. The number of eligible votes was recorded as much lower than the previous election. A census held in 1921 measured the precipitous population dip that had occurred in Edmonton during the war years and in the post-WWI recession.

== Results ==
- **bold** indicates elected
- italics indicate incumbent
- South Side, where data is available, indicates representative for Edmonton's South Side, with a minimum South Side representation instituted after the city of Strathcona, south of the North Saskatchewan River, amalgamated into Edmonton on February 1, 1912.

=== Mayor ===
Party	Candidate	Votes	%
**Citizens' League**	**David Duggan**	**4,937**	**45.49%**
Independent	Joseph Clarke	3,583	33.02%
Independent	Alexander Livingstone	1,482	13.66%
Independent	Bickerton Pratt	498	4.59%
Independent	Samuel McCoppen	330	3.04%
Independent	Albert Stimmel	22	0.20%

=== Aldermen ===
Due to each voter being able to cast up to 6 votes, 53,000 votes were cast in this election by the 11,000 voters who voted. The Plurality block voting system meant that it was possible for the largest group (even if just a minority of the voters) to take all the seats, leaving none to the others.

Party	Candidate	Votes
**Citizens' League**	**Joseph Adair**	**5,347**
**Labour**	**Rice Sheppard** (South Side)	**5,172**
**Citizens' League**	**Kenneth Alexander Blatchford**	**5,147**
**Citizens' League**	**Valentine Richards** (South Side)	**4,882**
**Citizens' League**	**James Collisson**	**4,801**
**Labour**	**Daniel Knott**	**4,170**
Labour	James Findlay	3,881
Citizens' League	Izena Ross*	3,845
Labour	E. E. Hyde	3,529
Independent	Archie Randall	3,525
Labour	H. Pallot	2,406
Citizens' League	S. W. Walker	1,735
Independent	L. T. Murray	1,419
Independent	E. G. Sutherland	1,198
Independent	Mrs. D. Lockman	1,077
Independent	M. F. Groat	915

- Izena Ross was a sitting councillor, running for re-election. She was the first woman on the Edmonton city council.

=== Public school trustees ===
- **W H Alexander** - 6146
- **E T Bishop** - 5350
- **L T Barclay** - 4794
- C W Leonard - 3955

=== Separate (Catholic) school trustees ===
R Crossland, P M Dunne, Joseph Gariépy, and J J Murray (South Side) were acclaimed.

=== Single Transferable Vote Plebiscite ===
Shall the Council pass Bylaw No. 42 (1922), being a bylaw for providing for the taking of the votes of the Electors at all future Elections of Mayor and Aldermen of the City of Edmonton by the "Proportional Representation System" known as the "Single Transferable Vote"?

- **Yes** - 5664
- No - 3075
