= 1924 Edmonton municipal election =

Municipal election in Alberta, Canada

The 1924 municipal election was held December 8, 1924, to elect a mayor and five aldermen to sit on Edmonton City Council and three trustees to sit on each of the public and separate school boards.

There were ten aldermen on city council, but five of the positions were already filled: Ambrose Bury, James McCrie Douglas, Joseph Duggan, James East, and James Findlay were all elected to two-year terms in 1923 and were still in office.

There were seven trustees on the public school board, but four of the positions were already filled: Samuel Barnes, Ralph Bellamy, Frank Crang (SS), and FS McPherson had all been elected to two-year terms in 1923 and were still in office. The same was true on the separate board, where Robert Crossland (SS), Paul Jenvrin, Thomas Magee, and Joseph Henri Picard were continuing.

The aldermanic election was conducted using the single transferable vote system to elect five members in a city-wide district; the mayor was elected through Instant-runoff voting.

== Voter turnout ==
There were 9,477 ballots cast out of 22,298 eligible voters, for a voter turnout of 42.5%.

== Results ==
- bold or ✓ indicates elected
- italics indicate incumbent
- "SS", where data is available, indicates candidate living on Edmonton's Southside, important because of the minimum South Side representation instituted after the city of Strathcona, on the south side of the North Saskatchewan River, amalgamated with Edmonton on February 1, 1912.

=== Mayor ===
Party	Candidate	Votes	%
Independent	Kenneth Alexander Blatchford	5,664	60.31%
Independent	Rice Sheppard	3,728	39.69%

=== Aldermen ===
Quota approximately 1580. This was the number of votes that guaranteed election.

Party	Candidate	Initial Votes	Elected
Independent	Joseph Clarke	2,296	✓
Citizens' Committee	James Collisson	2,009	✓
Citizens' Committee	Will Werner	1,030	✓
Labour	Charles Gibbs	802	✓
Labour	Daniel Knott	707	✓
Citizens' Committee	Archie Rendall	632	
Citizens' Committee	A. C. Grant	619	
Labour	James Herlihy	480	
Labour	Robert McCreath	460	
Labour	H. J. Pallot	341	
Independent	Gertrude McBain	67	

=== Public school trustees ===
Party	Candidate	Initial Votes	Elected
Citizens' Committee	Joseph Adair	2,767	✓
Citizens' Committee	Thyrza Bishop	2,351	✓
Labour	Elmer Roper	1,401	
Labour	T. J. Johnston	1,379	✓
Citizens' Committee	George Young	955	
Independent	J. H. W. Williams	587	
Independent	A. R. Lawrence	294	

Because of the single transferable vote system, Roper received more initial votes, but Johnston won based on votes subsequently transferred from other candidates.

=== Separate (Catholic) school trustees ===
Party	Candidate	Initial Votes	Elected
Independent	C. E. Barry	339	✓
Independent	P. M. Dunne	193	✓
Independent	E. H. Esch	133	
Independent	Harry Carrigan	74	✓

Because of the single transferable vote system, Esch received more initial votes, but Carrigan won based on votes subsequently transferred from other candidates.
