= Warren Prevey =

Canadian politician

Warren W. Prevey
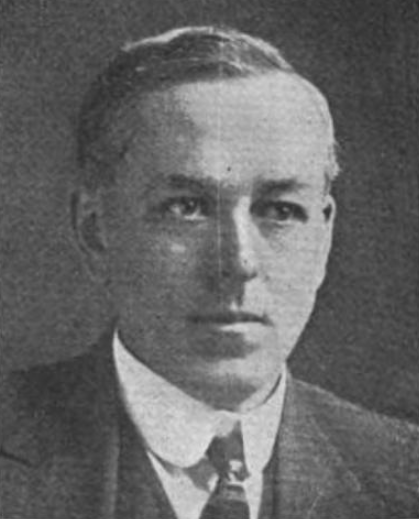

City of Edmonton Alderman
- In office December 10, 1917 – December 8, 1919 Serving with Aldermen elected in 1917

Member of the Legislative Assembly of Alberta
- In office June 28, 1926 – June 19, 1930 Serving with David Duggan, Charles Gibbs, John Lymburn and Charles Weaver
- Preceded by: John Bowen, Jeremiah Heffernan, William Henry, Nellie McClung and Andrew McLennan
- Succeeded by: William Atkinson and William Howson
- Constituency: Edmonton

Personal details
- Born: September 23, 1874 Elroy, Wisconsin
- Died: February 6, 1948 (aged 73)
- Party: Liberal
- Occupation: Businessman, politician

Warren W. Prevey (September 23, 1874 – February 6, 1948) was a business man and politician from Alberta, Canada. He served as a member of Edmonton City Council from 1917 to 1919 and later as a member of the Legislative Assembly of Alberta from 1926 to 1930 sitting with the Liberal caucus in opposition.

== Early life ==
Prevey founded Edmonton City Dairy & Barns Co. circa 1926 to deliver dairy products to residents in Edmonton, Alberta.

== Political career ==
Prevey began his political career on the municipal level. He ran for a seat to Edmonton City Council in the 1917 Edmonton municipal election. Prevey won the sixth place seat out of seven to earn a two-year term as an alderman. He did not run for a second term in 1919.

Prevey ran for a seat to the Alberta Legislature as a Liberal candidate in the 1926 Alberta general election. He won the second last of five seats in the district.

Prevey ran for re-election in the 1930 Alberta general election but was defeated. He finished in seventh place on the first vote count - and did not receive enough alternate preferences from voters in subsequent counts.
