= 1925 Edmonton municipal election =

Municipal election in Alberta, Canada

The 1925 municipal election was held December 14, 1925 to elect a mayor and seven aldermen to sit on Edmonton City Council and four trustees to sit on each of the public and separate school boards. In the election's only plebiscite, the voters also rejected a proposal to increase the mayor's term from one year to two.

There were ten aldermen on city council, but three of the positions were already filled: Will Werner, Charles Gibbs, and Daniel Knott were all elected to two-year terms in 1924 and were still in office. James Collisson and Joseph Clarke had also been elected in 1924, but both resigned to run for mayor. Accordingly, Charles Robson and Alfred Farmilo were elected to one-year terms.

There were seven trustees on the public school board, but three of the positions were already filled: Joseph Adair, Thyrza Bishop, and T J Johnston had all been elected to two-year terms in 1924 and were still in office. The same was true on the separate board, where C E Barry, E A Carrigan, and P M Dunne were continuing.

Voters in this election cast ranked votes. In the mayoral contest where one member was elected, the contest was conducted according to Instant-runoff voting; in contests where multiple members were elected, such as for city council and school boards, the contest was conducted according to the single transferable vote system.

The mayor was elected to a one year term, the term being finished in December 1926; all others were elected to two year terms, their terms being finished in December 1927.

== Voter turnout ==
There were 15,304 ballots cast out of 35,343 eligible voters, for a voter turnout of 43.3%.

== Results ==
- bold or ✓ indicates elected
- italics indicate incumbent
- "SS", where data is available, indicates representative for Edmonton's South Side, with a minimum South Side representation instituted after the city of Strathcona, south of the North Saskatchewan River, amalgamated into Edmonton on February 1, 1912.

=== Mayor ===
This election was conducted using Instant-runoff voting but no vote transfers were conducted in this case because Blatchford received a majority of votes on the first count.

Party	Candidate	Votes	%	Elected
Independent	Kenneth Alexander Blatchford	8,463	55.36%	✓
Independent	James Collisson	2,301	15.05%	
Independent	Joseph Clarke	2,098	13.72%	
Independent	Rice Sheppard	1,445	9.45%	
Independent	Joseph Adair	948	6.20%	
Independent	Gertrude McBain	31	0.20%	

=== Aldermen ===
This election was conducted using Single transferable voting.

Quota approximately 1825. This was the number of votes that guaranteed election.

Party	Candidate	Initial Votes		Elected
Civic Government Association	James McCrie Douglas	3,587	SS	✓
Labour	James East	2,839		✓
Civic Government Association	A C Sloane	1,541		✓
Civic Government Association	Frederick Keillor	1,273	SS	✓
Labour	James Findlay	1,071		✓
Civic Government Association	Robert Dolphin Tighe	1,028		
Civic Government Association	Charles Robson	988		✓
Labour	Alfred Farmilo	855		✓
Civic Government Association	C. W. Gimby	728		
Labour	James Herlihy	552		
Labour	Edward James Thompson	380		

Because of the single transferable vote system, Tighe received more initial votes, but Farmilo won (and Robson held) based on votes subsequently transferred from other candidates.

Douglas resigned less than a year later to run for mayor in the 1926 Edmonton municipal election.

=== Public school trustees ===
Party	Candidate	Votes		Elected
Civic Government Association	Ralph Bellamy	3,478		✓
Labour	Frank Crang	2,832	SS	✓
Civic Government Association	F. S. McPherson	2,825		✓
Labour	Elmer Roper	2,658		✓
Labour	Sophie N. Bell	1,503		
Civic Government Association	W. W. McBain	1,147		

=== Separate (Catholic) school trustees ===
Party	Candidate	Votes		Elected
Independent	Thomas Magee	371		✓
Independent	Charles Gariepy	365		✓
Independent	A J Ryan	336		✓
Independent	Paul Jenvrin	141		
Independent	Robert Crossland	133	SS	✓

Under the minimum South Side representation rule, Crossland was elected over Jenvrin.

=== Mayoral Term Plebiscite ===
Are you in favour of the Mayor holding office for the term of two years?

- Yes - 7251
- No - 8945
