= 1921 Edmonton municipal election =

Municipal election in Alberta, Canada

The 1921 municipal election was held December 12, 1921 to elect a mayor and seven aldermen to sit on Edmonton City Council and four trustees to sit on the public school board. F A French, Paul Jenvrin, Thomas Magee, and Joseph Henri Picard were acclaimed to two-year terms on the separate school board.

There were ten aldermen seats on city council, but three of the positions were still filled from the previous election: Joseph Adair, James Collisson, and Valentine Richards were all elected to two-year terms in 1920 and were still in office. William Campbell McArthur had also been elected to a two-year term, but had resigned in order to run for mayor. Andrew McLennan had also been elected to a two-year term only to resign. In order to fill these vacancies, Izena Ross and Kenneth Alexander Blatchford, the least popular of the top seven candidates, were elected to one-year terms.

Izena Ross, first elected in 1921, was Edmonton's first woman city councillor.

There were seven trustees on the public school board, but only four posts were open - three of the positions were already filled: W H Alexander, E T Bishop, and William Rea had all been elected to two-year terms in 1920 and were still in office.

The same was true on the separate board. Only four posts were open - J Cormack, J J Murray, and Joseph Gariépy were continuing.

The 1921 election was the first in which a woman - Izena Ross - was elected to city council.

== Voter turnout ==
Out of 33256 eligible voters, 10,943 cast ballots, for a voter turnout of 32.8%. (The vote count is much higher than that because each voter could cast up to seven votes in the aldermanic election.)

== Results ==
- **bold** indicates elected
- italics indicate incumbent
- South Side, where data is available, indicates representative for Edmonton's South Side, with a minimum South Side representation instituted after the city of Strathcona, south of the North Saskatchewan River, amalgamated with Edmonton on February 1, 1912.

=== Mayor ===
Party	Candidate	Votes	%
Citizens' League	**David Duggan**	7,011	66.87%
Independent	William Campbell McArthur	3,227	30.78%
Independent	Albert Stimmel	246	2.35%

=== Aldermen ===
Block Voting was used to elect the city councillors (aldermen). Each voter could cast up to seven votes. About 63,000 votes were cast in this election by about 10,000 voters. The Civic Government Association ran seven candidates and received the largest block of votes. But only its most popular candidate received support from a majority of voters. His supporters did not mark all their other six votes for CGA candidates and only six but not seven on the slate were elected.

Izena Ross, elected in 1921, was the first woman to run for a seat on the Edmonton city council. Her vote tally, showing support from about a third of the voters, was enough to win a seat.

Due to the guaranteed southside representation, southsiders Malone and Pratt were given two-year terms, although Pratt was less popular than northsiders Ross and Blatchford who were elected to one-year terms. Pratt lived at 11132 87th Avenue

Party	Candidate	Votes
Citizens' League	**Charles Weaver**	5,814
Dominion Labour Party	**James East**	4,968
Citizens' League	**Thomas Malone** (South Side)	4,685
Citizens' League	**Ambrose Bury**	4,673
Citizens' League	**Kenneth Alexander Blatchford**	4,277
Citizens' League	**Izena Ross**	3,341
Citizens' League	**Bickerton Pratt** (South Side)	3,256
Independent	Lyman Theophilus Barclay	3,119
Dominion Labour Party	James Findlay	3,112
Dominion Labour Party	E. E. Hyde	2,991
Independent	Archie Rendell	2,562
Independent	A. Boileau	2,322
Independent	S. D. Walker	1,585
Independent Labour Party	George L. Ritchie	1,501
Citizens' League	L. T. Murray	1,486
Independent	Mrs. A. S. Taylor	1,324
Independent Labour Party	Mary Cantin	1,095
Independent Labour Party	J. E. White	982
Independent	Hyman King	936

=== Public school trustees ===
Party	Candidate	Votes
Dominion Labour Party	**Samuel Barnes**	4,652
Citizens' League	**Ralph Bellamy**	4,512
Dominion Labour Party	**Frank Scott**	4,381
Citizens' League	Alex C. Grant	4,172
Dominion Labour Party	**Frank Crang** (South Side)	3,951
Citizens' League	Oscar F. Strong	3,810
Citizens' League	W. H. Speer	3,523
Dominion Labour Party	Raymond C. Ghostley	3,215

Under the minimum South Side representation rule, Crang was elected over Grant.

=== Separate (Catholic) school trustees ===
F A French (South Side), Paul Jenvrin, Thomas Magee, and Joseph Henri Picard were acclaimed.
