= 1920 Edmonton municipal election =

Municipal election in Alberta, Canada

The 1920 municipal election was held December 13, 1920, to elect a mayor and six aldermen to sit on Edmonton City Council and three trustees to sit on the public school board. J Cormack, Joseph Gariépy and J J Murray were acclaimed to two-year terms on the separate school board. In a plebiscite held at the same time, Edmontonians repeated their previous year's rejection of a proposal to pay aldermen. Ratepayers also voted down the various money bylaws that were up for discussion.

There were ten aldermen on city council, but four of the positions were already filled: Percy Abbott, John Bowen, James East and Rice Sheppard were all elected to two-year terms in 1919 and were still in office. J. A. Kinney had also been elected to a two-year term in 1919, but had resigned. Accordingly, Samuel McCoppen, who came in in sixth place, was elected to a one-year term.

Five candidates of a new party, the business-oriented Citizens Progressive League AKA the Citizens Committee or Citizens ticket, were elected to most of the open seats. McCoppen was the sole Labour Party candidate to be elected. A third party, the Independent Labor Party, ran two candidates but did not elect anyone.

There were seven trustees on the public school board, but four of the positions were already filled: Samuel Barnes, J. W. H. Williams, J A McPherson, and Frank Scott had all been elected to two-year terms in 1919 and were still in office. The same was true on the separate board, where Joseph Henri Picard, Paul Jenvrin, Thomas Magee, and Thomas Malone were continuing.

== Voter turnout ==
There were 14,710 ballots cast out of 26,903 eligible voters, for a voter turnout of 54.6%.

== Results ==
- **bold** indicates elected
- italics indicate incumbent
- South Side, where data is available, indicates representative for Edmonton's South Side, with a minimum South Side representation instituted after the city of Strathcona, south of the North Saskatchewan River, amalgamated into Edmonton on February 1, 1912.

=== Mayor ===
Party	Candidate	Votes	%
**Citizens' Progressive League**	**David Duggan**	**7,537**	**51.78%**
Labour	Joseph Clarke	6,974	47.90%
Independent	Albert Stimmel	47	0.32%

=== Aldermen ===
Block voting was used - each voter cast up to six votes.

Party	Candidate	Votes
**Citizens' Progressive League**	**Joseph Adair**	**7,023**
**Citizens' Progressive League**	**Andrew McLennan**	**6,996**
**Citizens' Progressive League**	**Valentine Richards** (South Side)	**6,385**
**Citizens' Progressive League**	**James Collisson**	**6,280**
**Citizens' Progressive League**	**William Campbell McArthur**	**5,679**
**Dominion Labour Party**	**Samuel McCoppen**	**5,478**
Dominion Labour Party	A. Boileau	5,133
Citizens' Progressive League	W. H. Speer	5,111
Dominion Labour Party	Alfred Farmilo	4,638
Dominion Labour Party	Daniel Kennedy Knott	4,625
Dominion Labour Party	J. J. Murray	4,574
Dominion Labour Party	G. Latham	4,312
Independent	John McKenzie	3,040
Independent Labor Party	George L. Ritchie	1,610
Independent Labor Party	Joseph White	957
Independent	Hyman King	760

=== Public school trustees ===
Block voting was used - each voter cast up to three votes.

Party	Candidate	Votes
**Citizens' Progressive League**	**Mrs. E. T. (Thryza) Bishop**	**6,988**
**Citizens' Progressive League**	**William Hardy Alexander**	**6,711**
**Citizens' Progressive League**	**William Rea**	**6,667**
Labour	J. W. B. Williams	5,599
Labour	Frank Crang	5,444
Labour	J. Heron	4,137

=== Separate (Catholic) school trustees ===
Party	Candidate	Votes
**Independent**	**J. Cormack**	**acclaimed**
**Independent**	**Joseph Gariépy**	**acclaimed**
**Independent**	**J. J. Murray** (South Side)	**acclaimed**

=== Plebiscite ===
**Should Aldermen be paid?**
	Votes	%
Yes	4,234	32.46%
**No**	**8,811**	**67.54%**

Ratepayers voted down the various money bylaws that were up for discussion.
