= 1930 Edmonton municipal election =

Municipal election in Alberta, Canada

The 1930 municipal election was held November 12, 1930 to elect a mayor and five aldermen to sit on Edmonton City Council and four trustees to sit on the public school board, while three trustees were acclaimed to the separate school board. This was the first election to be held in November; where elections had previously been held on the second Monday of December, beginning in 1930 they were held on the (presumably milder) second Wednesday of November to encourage voter turnout.

There were ten aldermen on city council, but five of the positions were already filled: Herbert Baker, Ralph Bellamy, Arthur Gainer, Dan Knott, and Rice Sheppard (SS) were all elected to two-year terms in 1929 and were still in office.

There were seven trustees on the public school board, but three of the positions were already filled: Frank Crang (SS), Arthur Cushing, and Albert Ottewell (SS) had all been elected to two-year terms in 1929 and were still in office. S T Bigelow had also been elected in 1929, but had resigned; accordingly, S A Dickson was elected to a one-year term. Similarly, there were only three vacancies on the seven member separate school board, where Charles Gariepy, Thomas Magee, A J Ryan, and J Tansey (SS) were continuing.

The acclamation of James McCrie Douglas as mayor marked the first mayoral acclamation since 1915.

== Voter turnout ==
There were 13,869 ballots cast out of 41,962 eligible voters, for a voter turnout of 33.0%.

== Results ==
- bold or ✓ indicates elected
- italics indicate incumbent
- "SS", where data is available, indicates representative for Edmonton's South Side, with a minimum South Side representation instituted after the city of Strathcona, south of the North Saskatchewan River, amalgamated into Edmonton on February 1, 1912.

=== Mayor ===
James McCrie Douglas was acclaimed for a second term as mayor.

=== Aldermen ===
Party	Candidate	Votes		Elected
Civic Government Association	Frederick Keillor	7,136	SS	✓
Labour	Charles Gibbs	6,889		✓
Civic Government Association	James Collisson	6,814		✓
Civic Government Association	Donald Lake	6,307		✓
Civic Government Association	Charles Gerald O'Connor	6,303		✓
Labour	James East	5,996		
Civic Government Association	F. R. Lovette	5,343		
Labour	James Findlay	5,242		
Labour	Harry Ainlay	4,864	SS	
Labour	Alfred Farmilo	4,692		
Independent	Joseph Clarke	2,514		
Communist	Jan Lakeman	1,001		

=== Public school trustees ===
Four trustees were elected.

Party	Candidate	Votes	Elected
Civic Government Association	Mrs. W. D. Ferris	6,654	✓
Civic Government Association	Frederick Casselman	6,370	✓
Labour	Samuel Barnes	6,243	✓
Civic Government Association	S.A. Dickson	6,190	✓
Civic Government Association	L. Y. Cairns	6,119	
Labour	Robert McCreath	5,007	
Labour	Mrs. S. N. Bell	4,728	
Labour	Sidney Bowcott	4,184	

=== Separate (Catholic) school trustees ===
Adrien Crowe (SS), J O Pilon, and W D Trainor were acclaimed.
