= 1929 Edmonton municipal election =

Municipal election in Alberta, Canada

The 1929 municipal election was held December 9, 1929 to elect a mayor and five aldermen to sit on Edmonton City Council and four trustees to sit on the public school board, while four trustees were acclaimed to the separate school board). In the election's only plebiscite, voters didn't endorse the extension of the half day Wednesday shopping holiday by the required two-thirds majority.

City council consisted of the mayor and ten aldermen, but five of the aldermanic positions were already filled: James Collisson, Alfred Farmilo, James Findlay, Charles Gibbs, and Frederick Keillor (SS) were all elected to two-year terms in 1928 and were still in office.

The public school board consisted of seven seven trustees, but four of the positions were already filled: Samuel Barnes, Thyrza Bishop, and Frederick Casselman had all been elected to two-year terms in 1928 and were still in office. The same was true on the separate board, where Robert Adrien Crowe (SS), J O Pilon, and W B Trainor were continuing.

== Electoral system ==
The mayor was elected through First-past-the-post voting. First past the post does not require that the successful candidate takes a majority of the votes, as the Instant-runoff voting system previously used had, but in this election the successful candidate did in fact receive a majority of the votes cast.

The aldermanic race, where five seats were being filled, was conducted using Plurality block voting and each voter could cast up to five votes. The successful candidates received a total of approximately 39,000 votes of the 76,000 voters cast by the 41,000 voters. The vote tally received by the successful candidates might have been cast by less than 9,000 of the 41,000 eligible voters.

== Voter turnout ==
There were 18,549 ballots cast out of 40,993 eligible voters, for a voter turnout of 45.2%.

A total of about 76,000 votes were cast in the aldermanic race due to the use of Plurality block voting.

== Results ==
- bold or ✓ indicates elected
- italics indicate incumbent
- "SS", where data is available, indicates representative for Edmonton's South Side, with a minimum South Side representation instituted after the city of Strathcona, south of the North Saskatchewan River, amalgamated into Edmonton on February 1, 1912.

=== Mayor ===
Party	Candidate	Votes	%
Civic Government Association	James McCrie Douglas	9,754	53.06%
Labour	James East	6,898	37.52%
Independent	Gerald Pelton	1,602	8.71%
Independent	William Gunn	130	0.71%

=== Aldermen ===
Party	Candidate	Votes		Elected
Civic Government Association	Ralph Bellamy	8,542		✓
Civic Government Association	Arthur Gainer	7,979		✓
Civic Government Association	Herbert Baker	7,681		✓
Labour	Dan Knott	7,419		✓
Labour	Rice Sheppard	7,032	SS	✓
Civic Government Association	Thomas Shaftoe Thompson	6,643		
Labour	Edward James Thompson	5,612		
Labour	George Latham	5,482		
Independent	Hugh MacDonald	5,287		
Labour	James Herlihy	4,834	SS	
Independent	Joseph Clarke	4,139		
Independent	Joseph Adair	3,670		
Communist	Jan Lakeman	1,283		
Communist	Herbert John Pallot	590		
Independent	Wilfred Rose	418		

=== Public school trustees ===
Party	Candidate	Votes		Elected
Civic Government Association	Albert Ottewell	9,779	SS	✓
Civic Government Association	Arthur Cushing	8,742		✓
Labour	Frank Crang	8,321	SS	✓
Civic Government Association	Shurburne Tupper Bigelow	7,900		✓
Civic Government Association	Robert Muir	7,860		
Labour	Thomas John Johnston	7,124		
Labour	Sophie N. Bell	6,788		
Labour	Sidney Bowcott	4,744		

=== Separate (Catholic) school trustees ===
Charles Gariepy, Thomas Magee, A J Ryan and J Tansey (SS) were acclaimed to the separate school board.

=== Wednesday Holiday Plebiscite ===
This plebiscite items required a minimum two-thirds "Yes" majority to bring about action, and in the vote the Yes side did not reach that mark.

In favour of having Wednesday half-holiday extended to cover all the year except the month of December?

- Yes - 1,097
- No - 654
