= 1927 Edmonton municipal election =

Municipal election in Alberta, Canada

The 1927 municipal election was held December 12, 1927 to elect a mayor and five aldermen to sit on Edmonton City Council and four trustees to sit on each of the public and separate school boards. Voters also voted on two plebiscite questions.

There were ten aldermen on city council, but five of the positions were already filled: Charles Gibbs, Alfred Farmilo, Charles Robson, George Hazlett, and Herbert Baker were all elected to two-year terms in 1926 and were still in office.

There were seven trustees on the public school board, but three of the positions were already filled: Samuel Barnes, Thyrza Bishop, and J A Herlihy (SS) had all been elected to two-year terms in 1926 and were still in office. The same was true on the separate board, where Harry Carrigan, J O Pilon, and W D Trainor were continuing.

This election was the last to use the single transferable vote election system to elect city councillors and school trustees and the instant-runoff voting election system to elect the mayor, as a plebiscite held concurrently with the election saw a majority of Edmontonians voting to return to a mixed first past the post and block voting election system. Ranked votes had been used since 1923.

== Voter turnout ==
A total of 12,907 votes were cast out of 37,106 eligible voters, for a voter turnout of 34.7%.

== Results ==
- bold or ✓ indicates elected
- italics indicate incumbent
- "SS", where data is available, indicates representative for Edmonton's South Side, with a minimum South Side representation instituted after the city of Strathcona, south of the North Saskatchewan River, amalgamated into Edmonton on February 1, 1912.

=== Mayor ===
Party	Candidate	Votes	%
Independent	Ambrose Bury	7,483	57.89%
Labour	Dan Knott	4,406	34.08%
Independent	Joseph Clarke	958	7.41%
Independent	J. Pfeim	80	0.62%

=== Aldermen ===
Five to be elected.

Quota approx. 2151. This vote tally guaranteed election.

Party	Candidate	Initial Votes		Elected in the end
Civic Government Association	Ralph Bellamy	2,195		✓
Civic Government Association	Allan Sloane	1,951		✓
Labour	James East	1,922		✓
Civic Government Association	John C. Bowen	1,514		✓
Civic Government Association	Frederick Keillor	1,227	SS	
Labour	James Findlay	914		
Labour	Lionel Shurley Crawford Dineen	798	SS	✓
Independent	G. V. Pelton	784		
Civic Government Association	A. M. Rehwinkel	550		
Labour	James Herlihy	485		
Labour	E. J. Thompson	375		

Keillor and Findlay initially received more votes than Dineen, but Dineen, not them, won a seat, due to having more votes at the end (caused by votes transferred from other candidates under the Single Transferable Voting election system).

=== Public school trustees ===
Party	Candidate	Initial Votes		Elected
Civic Government Association	Arthur Cushing	2,458		✓
Civic Government Association	Albert Ottewell	2,457	SS	✓
Labour	Frank Crang	2,020	SS	✓
Labour	Elmer Roper	2,005		✓
Labour	Sophie N. Bell	1,416		
Civic Government Association	James Harwood Ogilvie	1,123		

=== Separate (Catholic) school trustees ===
Party	Candidate	Votes		Elected
Independent	Robert Crossland	330	SS	✓
Independent	Charles Gariepy	323		✓
Independent	Thomas Magee	315		✓
Independent	B J Tansey	218	SS	✓
Independent	J R Naubert	90		

=== Plebiscites ===
==== Assessing Improvements on Industrial Establishments ====
To authorize the Council to fix the Assessment of improvements for industrial establishments.

- Yes - 2,224
- No - 1,038

==== Abolition of Single Transferable Vote ====
To abolish the Proportional Representation System of electing mayor and aldermen.

- Yes - 6,695
- No - 5,473
