= 1932 Edmonton municipal election =

Municipal election in Alberta, Canada

The 1932 municipal election was held November 9, 1932 to elect a mayor and five aldermen to sit on Edmonton City Council and three trustees to sit on the public school board, while three trustees were acclaimed to the separate school board.

There were ten aldermen on city council, but five of the positions were already filled: Rice Sheppard (SS), Harry Ainlay (SS), James Findlay, Herbert Baker, and Arthur Gainer were all elected to two-year terms in 1931 and were still in office.

There were seven trustees on the public school board, but four of the positions were already filled: Albert Ottewell (SS), Frank Crang (SS), L. Y. Cairns, and Arthur Cushing had all been elected to two-year terms in 1931 and were still in office. The same was true of the separate school board, where Charles Gariepy, T Malone, Thomas Magee, and J Tansey (SS) were continuing.

== Voter turnout ==
There were 22,538 ballots cast out of 43,523 eligible voters, for a voter turnout of 51.7%.

== Results ==
- bold or ✓ indicates elected
- italics indicate incumbent
- "SS", where data is available, indicates representative for Edmonton's South Side, with a minimum South Side representation instituted after the city of Strathcona, south of the North Saskatchewan River, amalgamated into Edmonton on February 1, 1912.

=== Mayor ===
| Party | Candidate | Votes | % |
|---|---|---|---|
| Labour | Daniel Kennedy Knott | 13,682 | 60.71% |
| Independent | Joseph Clarke | 6,434 | 28.55% |
| Independent | Kenneth Alexander Blatchford | 2,422 | 10.75% |

=== Aldermen ===
| Party | Candidate | Votes | Elected |
|---|---|---|---|
| Labour | Charles Gibbs | 11,161 | ✓ |
| United Citizens of Edmonton | John Wesley Fry | 10,287 | ✓ |
| United Citizens of Edmonton | James Ogilvie | 10,052 | ✓ |
| Labour | James East | 9,529 | ✓ |
| United Citizens of Edmonton | John McCreath | 9,119 | ✓ |
| United Citizens of Edmonton | John Savage | 8,318 | |
| Independent | Raymond C. Ghostley | 7,975 | |
| Labour | Alfred Farmilo | 7,837 | |
| United Citizens of Edmonton | I. W. I. McEchern | 7,799 | |
| Communist | Mrs. I. G. Ringwood | 6,604 | |
| Labour | Sidney Parsons | 6,229 | |
| Communist | Jan Lakeman | 2,978 | |
| Independent | Peter Glassman | 2,091 | |
| Independent | F. S. Wright | 1,852 | |
| Communist | George H. Salter | 1,376 | |

=== Public school trustees ===
Three were elected.

| Party | Candidate | Votes | Elected |
|---|---|---|---|
| United Citizens of Edmonton | Mrs. E G Ferris | 11,941 | ✓ |
| United Citizens of Edmonton | Frederick Casselman | 10,329 | ✓ |
| Labour | Samuel Barnes | 9,782 | ✓ |
| United Citizens of Edmonton | W. G. Walford | 7,719 | |
| Labour | Daniel Powers | 7,680 | |
| Labour | L. E. Price | 4,980 | |
| Independent | Mrs. J. G. Stewart | 2,376 | |

=== Separate (Catholic) school trustees ===
Adrien Crowe (SS), J O Pilon, and W D Trainor were acclaimed.
