= Albert Ewing =

Canadian politician

Albert Freeman Ewing
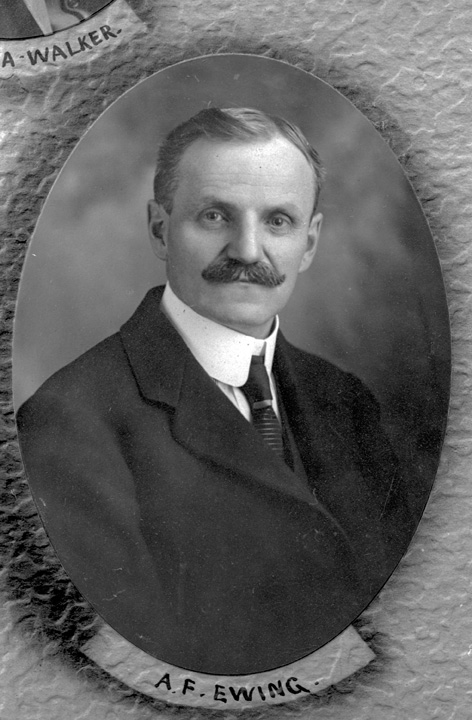

Member of the Legislative Assembly of Alberta for Edmonton (West) Edmonton (1913-1917)
- In office March 25, 1913 – July 18, 1921
- Preceded by: Charles Cross; John McDougall
- Succeeded by: Andrew McLennan; John Bowen; Nellie McClung; John Boyle; Jeremiah Heffernan

Personal details
- Born: June 29, 1871 Elora, Ontario
- Died: August 28, 1946 (aged 75) Edmonton, Alberta
- Party: Conservative
- Spouse(s): Annie Lafferty, Jean Agnes McFarquhar
- Education: Toronto University
- Occupation: politician and judge

Albert Freeman Ewing KC (June 29, 1871 – August 26, 1946) was a provincial politician and judge from Alberta, Canada. He served as a member of the Legislative Assembly of Alberta from 1913 to 1921 sitting with the Conservative caucus in opposition. After his political career he was appointed as a judge to the Supreme Court of Alberta.

== Early life ==
Albert Freeman Ewing was born June 29, 1871, in Elora, Ontario to Alexander Ewing of Ireland and Mary Manarey, of United Empire Loyalist descent. He was educated at Elora High School and later Toronto University where he attained a Bachelor of Arts. He was married to his first wife Annie Lafferty, the daughter of James Delamere Lafferty who was the fifth Mayor of Calgary. His second marriage was to Jean Agnes McFarquhar of Thorsby.

== Political career ==
Ewing ran a seat to the Alberta Legislature as a Conservative candidate in the 1909 Alberta general election. He ran for office in the Edmonton electoral district. Ewing would be defeated finishing in third place out of four candidates in the block vote that elected Liberals Charles Cross and John McDougall.

Ewing would run in his second attempt to gain a seat in the provincial legislature in a by-election held on May 27, 1912. He finished a close second in a very tight four-way race losing to William Henry.

A year later Ewing ran in his third attempt at provincial office in the 1913 Alberta general election. He would be elected to the second seat in the block vote by a very slim margin over Alexander MacKay.

The 1917 boundary redistribution saw the Edmonton electoral district would be divided up into three single member constituencies. Ewing would run in the district of Edmonton (West). He faced incumbent William Henry in a two-way race in the 1917 general election. Ewing would defeat Henry with a solid majority to win his second term in office and pickup the new district of his party.

Edmonton would again be re-constituted into a single riding in the 1921 Alberta general election Ewing would attempt to win his seat under the new Block vote system. He would finish seventh in the field of 26 candidates and be defeated. Ewing would also contest the 1924 by-election in the Edmonton electoral district following John Robert Boyle being appointed to the Supreme Court of Alberta, however he would be defeated by William Thomas Henry.

== Judicial career ==
Ewing was appointed to the Supreme Court of Alberta. On December 12, 1934, Ewing was appointed to chair the Royal Commission on the Condition of the Halfbreed Population of the Province of Alberta (Ewing Commission) along with members James McCrie Douglas and Dr. Edward A. Brathwaite to look at issues affecting the Métis population including land claims, hunting rights and treaty status. The commission would deliver its findings later in 1936
