= 1928 Edmonton municipal election =

Municipal election in Alberta, Canada

The 1928 municipal election was held on December 10, 1928 to elect a mayor and six aldermen to join Edmonton City Council and three trustees to join the public school board during the year of 1929 and 1930. Three trustees were elected by acclamation to join the separate school board for 1929 and 1930.

There were also six bylaws put to a citywide vote.

10 aldermen sat on city council at any one time. Four of the positions were already filled: Ralph Bellamy, A C Sloane, James East, and L S C Dineen were all elected to two-year terms in 1927 and were still in office. John C. Bowen had also been elected to a two-year term, but had resigned in order to run for mayor. Rice Sheppard (SS) was elected in the 1928 election to finish Bowen's term.

Labour did well in this election, electing four new alderman (counting farmer activist Sheppard) to add to East and Dineen who continued to serve in 1929. These six out of 11 seats gave Labour a majority position in city hall in 1929.

There were seven trustees on the public school board, but four of the positions were already filled: Frank Crang (SS), Arthur Cushing, Albert Ottewell (SS), and Elmer Roper had all been elected to two-year terms in 1927 and were still in office. The same was true on the separate board, where Robert Crossland (SS), Charles Gariepy, Thomas Magee, and B J Tansey (SS) were continuing.

This election marked Edmonton's return to the at-large Plurality block voting for election of city councilors and school board trustees and first past the post for the mayoral election, under which each voter had as many votes as there were seats to fill. In the previous five elections, single transferable vote/PR had been used for aldermanic elections and Instant-runoff voting for mayoral contests. As had been the case since Edmonton was declared a town in 1892 and a city in 1904, no wards divided the city voters.

Due to the plurality block voting system used to elect the aldermen, 78,000 votes were cast in the aldermanic contest by the approximately 15,000 voters who voted. This was very many more than had been counted in the previous election when STV had been used for the same purpose.

== Voter turnout ==
14,971 voters cast ballots, out of 37,915 eligible voters, for a voter turnout of 39.4%. (The vote count is much more than the number of ballots cast due to the block-voting system in use for election of councillors and school trustees.)

== Results ==
- bold or ✓ indicates elected
- italics indicate incumbent
- "SS", where data is available, indicates representative for Edmonton's South Side, with a minimum South Side representation instituted after the city of Strathcona, south of the North Saskatchewan River, amalgamated into Edmonton on February 1, 1912.

=== Mayor ===
| Party | Candidate | Votes | % |
|---|---|---|---|
| Independent | Ambrose Bury | 8,970 | 59.92% |
| Independent | John C. Bowen | 6,001 | 40.08% |

=== Aldermen ===
| Party | Candidate | Votes | | Elected |
|---|---|---|---|---|
| Labour | Charles Gibbs | 7,841 | | ✓ |
| Civic Government Association | Frederick Keillor | 6,881 | SS | ✓ |
| Labour | Alfred Farmilo | 6,294 | | ✓ |
| Labour | James Findlay | 6,273 | | ✓ |
| Independent | Rice Sheppard | 6,262 | SS | ✓ |
| Civic Government Association | James Collisson | 6,255 | | ✓ |
| Civic Government Association | George Hazlett | 6,107 | | |
| Civic Government Association | Herbert Baker | 5,978 | | |
| Civic Government Association | George Wilkinson | 4,908 | | |
| Labour | James Herlihy | 4,561 | | |
| Independent | G. V. Pelton | 4,417 | | |
| Labour | J. A. Thompson | 4,623 | | |
| Independent | Joseph Clarke | 4,130 | | |
| Independent | Charles Robson | 4,026 | | |

=== Public school trustees ===
| Party | Candidate | Votes | Elected |
|---|---|---|---|
| Labour | Samuel Barnes | 7,022 | ✓ |
| Civic Government Association | Thyrza Bishop | 6,300 | ✓ |
| Civic Government Association | Frederick Casselman | 5,641 | ✓ |
| Civic Government Association | R. Colwill | 5,340 | |
| Labour | E. E. Owen | 5,300 | |
| Labour | Mrs. D. T. Bell | 5,267 | |
| Independent | S. T. Lawrie | 2,469 | |

=== Separate (Catholic) school trustees ===
A J Crowe (SS), J O Pilon, and W D Trainor were acclaimed.

=== Money Bylaws ===
- Money items required a minimum two-thirds "Yes" majority to approve the expenditure

==== $86,525 for paving ====
- Yes - 4,305
- No - 824

==== $50,000 for gravelling ====
- Yes - 4,288
- No - 802

==== $23,860 for airport improvements ====
- Yes - 3,065
- No - 1,692

==== $292,688 for a hospital ====
- Yes - 4,362
- No - 998

==== $50,000 for a firehall ====
- Yes - 3,735
- No - 1,169

==== $100,000 for fire equipment ====
- Yes - 4,044
- No - 935
