= James Ramsey (politician) =

Canadian politician (1864–1939)

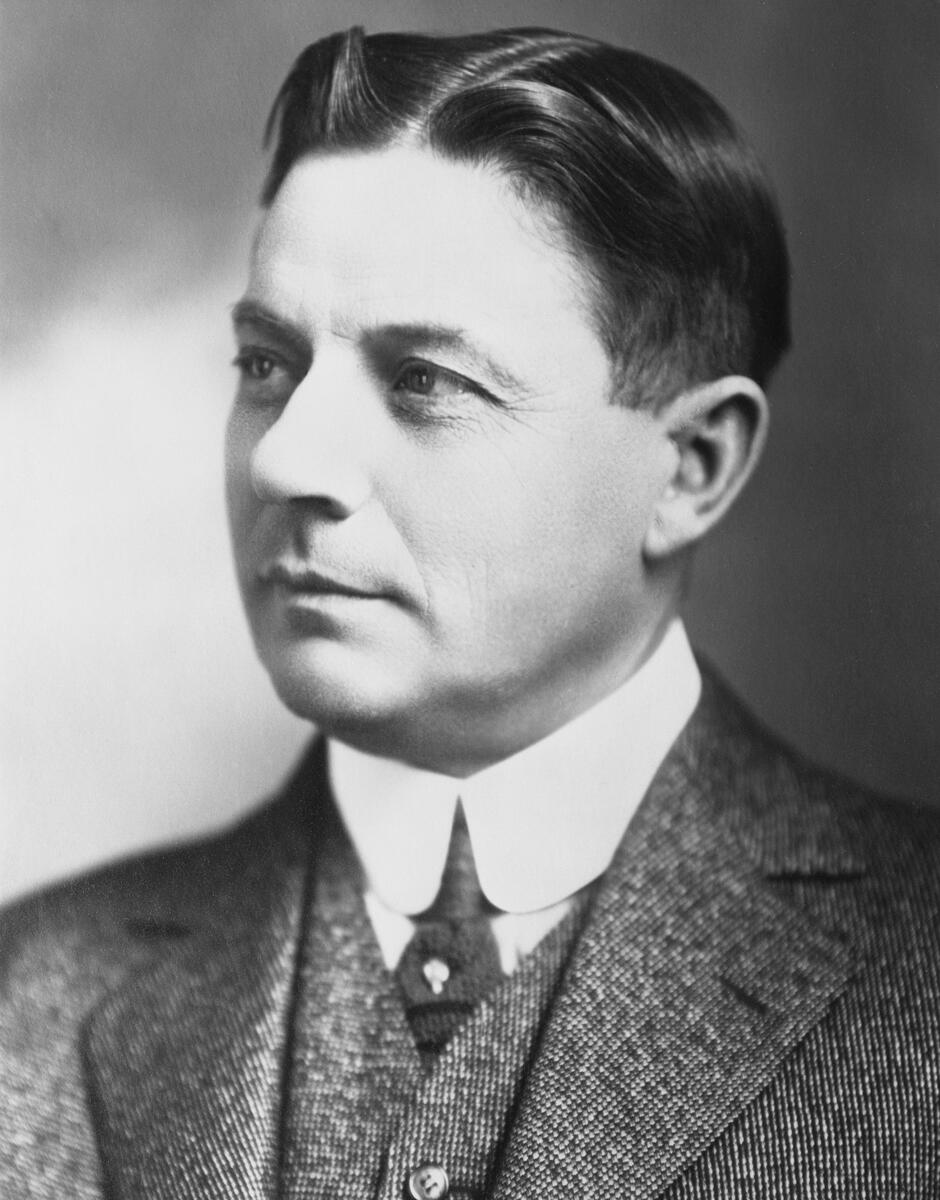

Leader of the Official Opposition in Alberta
- In office February 17, 1920 – April 10, 1920
- Preceded by: George Hoadley
- Succeeded by: Albert Ewing

Member of the Legislative Assembly of Alberta
- In office 1917–1921
- Constituency: Edmonton East

Personal details
- Born: April 4, 1864 Imlay City, Michigan, United States
- Died: December 23, 1939 (aged 75) Bahamas
- Party: Conservative

James "Merchant Prince" Ramsey (April 4, 1864 – December 23, 1939) was a provincial politician and business man from Alberta, Canada.

== Early life ==
Ramsey was born in 1864 in Imlay City, Michigan. He was raised in Plattsville, Ontario. He began his career working as a merchandiser in his home town. He ended up traveling all over eastern North America eventually apprenticing under his father at his retail store in Guelph, Ontario. He moved west to Edmonton in 1910 and founded his own department store.

== Business career ==
Ramsey founded and owned a popular department store in Edmonton titled James Ramsey Ltd. His store specialized in food, clothing, prescription drug and stationery. Ramsey remained in business until 1928 when he sold his store and merchandise to the T. Eaton Company. In 1929 Ramsey founded an investment company called Ramsey Hunt and Ramsey Limited. He retired a year later and moved to the Bahamas.

== Political career ==
Ramsey began his political career on the municipal level. He ran for Alderman in the 1914 Edmonton municipal election. He served his two-year term in office before seeking election on the provincial level.

Ramsey was elected to the Legislative Assembly of Alberta in the 1917 Alberta general election. He won the electoral district of Edmonton East. He won the hotly contested election defeating three other candidates included future Edmonton Mayor Joseph Clarke.

Ramsey would become the leader of the Conservative Party after George Hoadley resigned and crossed the floor to the United Farmers of Alberta. Ramsey led the party for a year until 1921 when Albert Ewing took over as leader. He did not run in the 1921 Alberta general election and retired from provincial politics.

Ramsey returned to municipal politics with a bid to become mayor of Edmonton in the 1923 Edmonton municipal election. He was handily defeated by Kenny Blatchford. This was his last bid at politics.

== Late life and legacy ==
Ramsey had two wives and fathered two daughters and a son. The Kelly and Ramsey building in downtown Edmonton is named in his honor. Ramsey died in his Bahamas home in December 1939 at the age of 75.

Legislative Assembly of Alberta
Preceded by New District	MLA Edmonton East; 1917–1921	Succeeded by District Abolished
