= 1930 Alberta general election =

- June 19, 1930

60 seats in the Legislative Assembly of Alberta 31 seats were needed for a majority
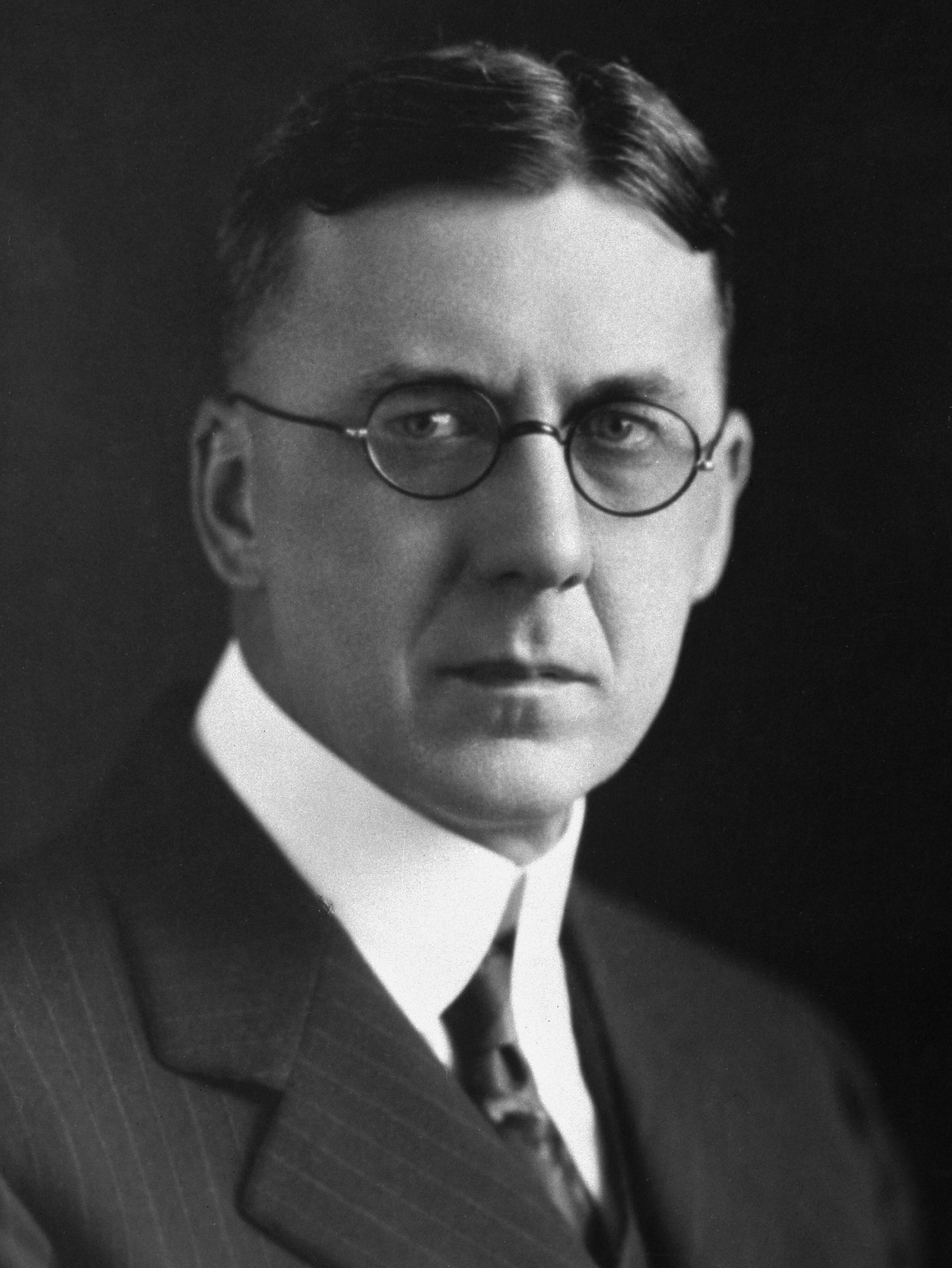

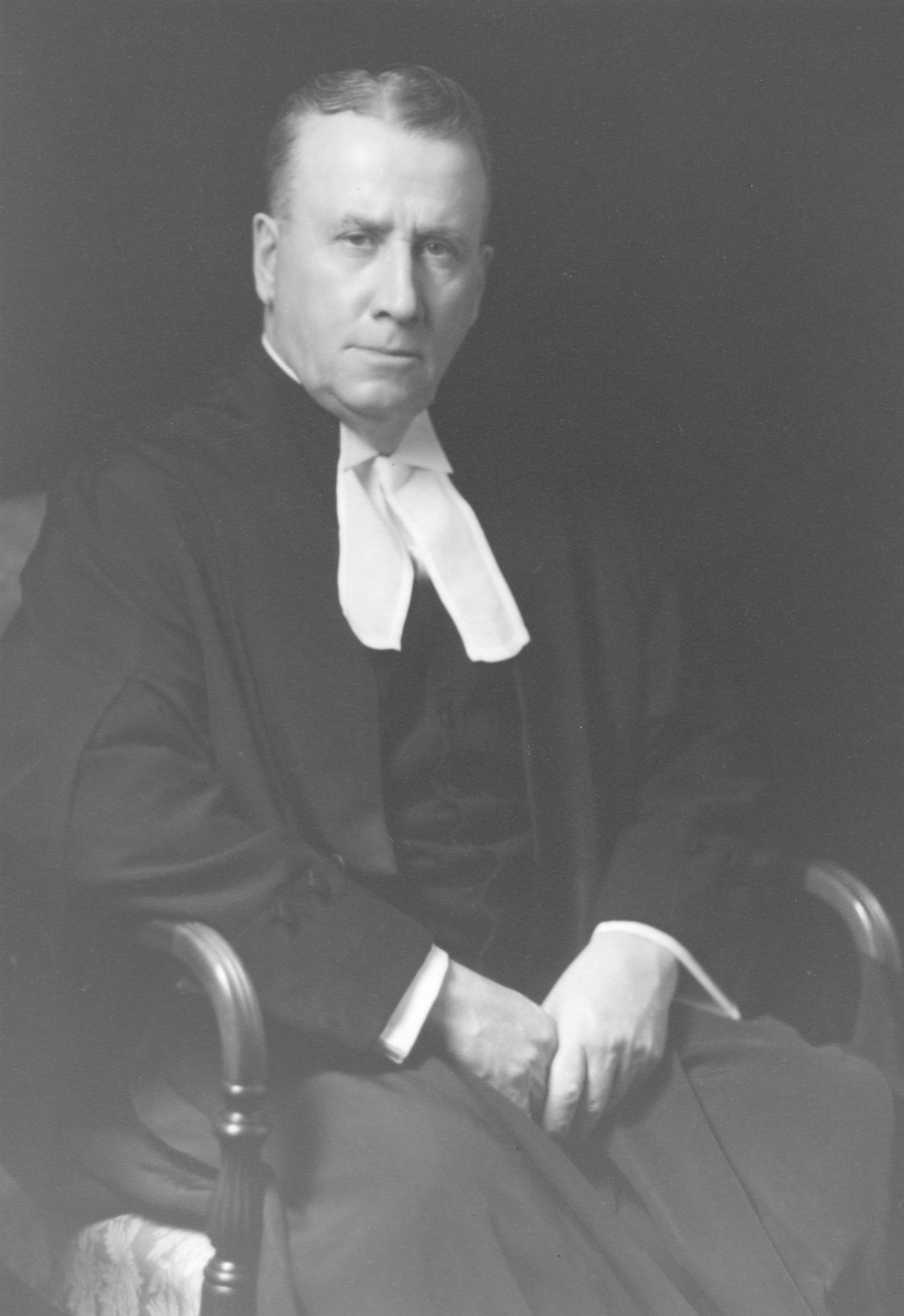

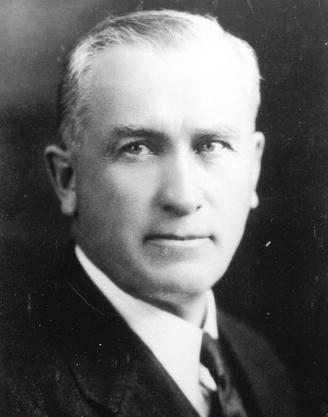

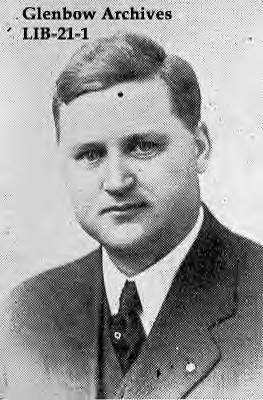
	Majority party	Minority party
Leader	John E. Brownlee	John W. McDonald
Party	United Farmers	Liberal
Leader since	November 23, 1925	March 27, 1930
Leader's seat	Ponoka	ran in unknown
Last election	43 seats, 39.7%	7 seats, 26.2%
Seats before	44	6
Seats won	39	11
Seat change	▼5	▲5
Popular vote	74,187	46,275
Percentage	39.4%	24.6%
Swing	▼0.3%	▼1.6%
	Third party	Fourth party
Leader	David M. Duggan	Fred J. White
Party	Conservative	Dominion Labor
Leader since	1930	between 1921 & 1926
Leader's seat	Edmonton	Calgary
Last election	4 seats, 22.1%	5 seats, 7.8%
Seats before	4	5
Seats won	6	4
Seat change	▲2	▼1
Popular vote	27,954	14,354
Percentage	14.8%	7.6%
Swing	▼7.3%	▼0.2%
Premier before election
John E. Brownlee
United Farmers
Premier after election
John E. Brownlee
United Farmers

The 1930 Alberta general election was held on June 19, 1930, to elect members of the Legislative Assembly of Alberta.

The United Farmers of Alberta won election to a third term in government, and John E. Brownlee continued as premier.

This provincial election, like the previous election (1926), used district-level proportional representation (Single transferable voting) to elect the MLAs of Edmonton and Calgary. (Medicine Hat no longer had multiple seats.) City-wide districts were used to elect multiple MLAs in the two main cities.

All the other MLAs were elected in single-member districts through Instant-runoff voting.

Th United Farmers again ran one candidate in Edmonton and won that seat and did not run in Calgary.

Altogether in the cities the UFA won just one seat in the cities (in Edmonton) but won a great share of the rural seats, by securing the support of a majority of votes in each district, as required under IRV (AKA Alternative Voting).

The effect of STV in the cities was that candidates of four parties - UFA, Conservative, Liberal and Labour - were elected in Edmonton reflecting votes cast.

STV in Calgary similarly produced mixed representation reflecting votes cast. Candidates of the Conservative, Liberal and Labour parties were elected there.

== Nominations ==
There were a significant number of Independent nominations, many of which were in districts where the Liberals chose not to field candidates. In addition, four Communist Party candidates were nominated:

Communist candidates in the 1930 election
District	Candidate	Votes received (on 1st preference)
Calgary	John O'Sullivan	460
Drumheller	John O'Sullivan	188
Edmonton	Jan Lakeman	752
Rocky Mountain	Rich Sudworth	783
Total		2,183

== Beaver River ==
The most closely contested race in the election happened in the Beaver River electoral district. The election was a three-way race between incumbent United Farmers MLA John Delisle Liberal candidate Henry Dakin and Independent candidate Luc Lebel.

The first count results showed Delisle leading Dakin by seven votes. Lebel was in third place with 87 votes. Under Instant runoff voting, when no candidate has a majority, the least-popular candidate is eliminated and his votes transferred. Lebel was eliminated and his 87 votes were transferred where second-choice preference had been marked. The new vote tallies showed Delisle with 21 more votes than Dakin. Delisle was declared elected on June 25, 1930, six days after the election was held.

The Liberals challenged the results in provincial court. A judicial recount was ordered. Judge Taylor concluded on August 21, 1930, that the second count results showed Dakin had four more votes than Delisle. Delisle's election was overturned, and Dakin picked up the seat.

== 1930 redistribution of districts ==
An Act was passed in 1930 providing for an increase of seats from 60 to 63, upon the next election. Calgary and Edmonton now returned six MLAs each instead of five each, and the following other changes were made:

Abolished	New
New districts
	Clover Bar (Note: from parts of Edmonton, Leduc and Victoria)
	Drumheller (Note: from parts of Bow Valley and Hand Hills)
	Grande Prairie (Note: from part of Peace River)
Merger of districts
Claresholm; Nanton	Nanton-Claresholm
High River; Okotoks	Okotoks-High River

== Results ==
Elections to the 7th Alberta Legislative Assembly (1930)
Party	Leader	Candidates	First-preference votes				Seats		
Party	Leader	Candidates	Votes	±	% Fpv	Change (pp)	1926	1930	±
United Farmers	John E. Brownlee	47	74,187	2,220▲	39.41	-0.27	43	39 / 63	4▼
Liberal	John W. McDonald	36	46,275	1,175▼	24.59	-1.58	7	11 / 63	4▲
Conservative	David M. Duggan	18	27,954	12,137▼	14.85	-7.25	4	6 / 63	2▲
Dominion Labor	Fred J. White	11	14,354	231▲	7.63	-0.16	5	4 / 63	1▼
Independent		25	23,266	10,712▲	12.36	11.66	–	3 / 63	3▲
Communist	Jan Lakeman	4	2,183	2,183▲	1.16	1.16	–	0 / 63	–
Independent Labour		–	Campaigned as Independent			-1.37	1	0 / 63	1▼
Total		141	188,219		100.00%				
Rejected ballots			7,707	1,148▼					
Turnout			195,926	11,934▲	66.7%	0.5▼			
Registered voters			293,798	20,048▲					

== MLAs elected ==
Acadia: Lorne Proudfoot
Alexandra: Peter Enzenauer
Athabasca: Frank Falconer
Beaver River: Henry H. Dakin
Bow Valley: John Mackintosh
Calgary: John J. Bowlen
Calgary: Hugh Farthing
Calgary:Harold McGill
Calgary: John Irwin
Calgary: George Harry Webster
Calgary: Fred White
Camrose: Vernor Smith
Cardston: George Stringam
Clover Bar: Rudolph Hennig
Cochrane: Robert McCool
Coronation: George Johnston
Cypress: Perren Baker
Didsbury: Austin Claypool
Drumheller: Fred Moyer
Edmonton: William Atkinson
Edmonton: David Milwyn Duggan
Edmonton: Charles Gibbs
Edmonton: William Howson
Edmonton: John Lymburn
Edmonton: Charles Weaver
Edson: Christopher Pattinson
Empress: William Smith
Gleichen: John Buckley
Grande Prairie: Hugh Allen
Grouard: Leonidas Giroux
Hand Hills: Gordon Forster
Innisfail: Donald Cameron
Lac Ste. Anne: Charles McKeen
Lacombe: Irene Parlby
Leduc: Arthur Percy Mitchell
Lethbridge: Andrew Smeaton
Little Bow: Oran McPherson
Macleod: William Shield
Medicine Hat: Hector Lang
Nanton-Claresholm: Gordon Beverly Walker
Okotoks-High River: George Hoadley
Olds: Frank Grisdale
Peace River: William Bailey
Pembina: George MacLachlan
Pincher Creek: Harvey Bossenberry
Ponoka: John Brownlee
Red Deer: George Wilbert Smith
Ribstone: William Farquharson
Rocky Mountain: George Cruickshank
St. Albert: Omer St. Germain
St. Paul: Joseph Miville Dechene
Sedgewick: Albert Andrews
Stettler: Albert Sanders
Stony Plain: Donald Macleod
Sturgeon: Samuel Carson
Taber: John MacLellan
Vegreville: Archie Matheson
Vermilion: Richard Reid
Victoria: Peter Miskew
Wainwright: John Love
Warner: Maurice Conner
Wetaskiwin: Hugh John Montgomery
Whitford: Isidore Goresky

=== Synopsis of results ===
Results by riding – 1930 Alberta general election (all except Calgary and Edmonton)
Riding	First-preference votes							Turnout (Note: including spoilt ballots)	Final counts					Winning party	
Name	UFA	Lib	Con	Lab	Comm	Ind	Total	Turnout	UFA	Lib	Con	Lab	Ind	1926	1930
Acadia	2,103	–	–	–	–	823	2,926	74.3%	Elected on 1st count					UFA	UFA
Alexandra	1,725	649	–	–	–	–	2,374	54.2%	Elected on 1st count					UFA	UFA
Athabasca	861	1,057	–	–	–	–	1,918	63.9%	Elected on 1st count					Lib	Lib
Beaver River	1,028	1,021	–	–	–	87	2,136	65.7%	1,032	1,036	–	–	–	UFA	Lib
Bow Valley	959	–	–	–	–	1,253	2,212	81.8%	Elected on 1st count					Lib	Ind
Camrose	3,137	2,086	–	–	–	–	5,223	78.1%	Elected on 1st count					UFA	UFA
Cardston	1,364	825	–	–	–	–	2,189	65.4%	Elected on 1st count					UFA	UFA
Clover Bar	1,338	–	692	–	–	866	2,896	68.9%	1,462	–	–	–	1,115	New	UFA
Cochrane	1,174	1,162	–	–	–	–	2,336	76.4%	Elected on 1st count					UFA	UFA
Coronation	2,084	–	–	–	–	1,983	4,067	80.5%	Elected on 1st count					UFA	UFA
Cypress	1,315	1,060	–	–	–	–	2,375	76.7%	Elected on 1st count					UFA	UFA
Didsbury	1,756	–	–	–	–	1,470	3,226	78.5%	Elected on 1st count					UFA	UFA
Drumheller	–	–	–	866	188	1,644 (Note: Fred Moyer led with 922 votes, and was the eventual winner.)	2,698	80.6%	–	–	–	1,036	1,113	New	Ind
Edson	–	777	–	2,434	–	–	3,211	61.4%	Elected on 1st count					Lab	Lab
Empress	941	–	–	–	–	617	1,558	71.3%	Elected on 1st count					UFA	UFA
Gleichen	1,566	–	–	–	–	1,069	2,635	67.2%	Elected on 1st count					UFA	UFA
Grande Prairie	Acclamation (Note: Hugh Allen was previously incumbent in Peace River)													New	UFA
Grouard	1,017	1,706	–	–	–	–	2,723	68.4%	Elected on 1st count					Lib	Lib
Hand Hills	2,689	–	–	–	–	1,507	4,196	74.3%	Elected on 1st count					UFA	UFA
Innisfail	1,243	878	604	–	–	–	2,725	71.8%	1,362	1,147	–	–	–	UFA	UFA
Lac Ste. Anne	Acclamation													UFA	UFA
Lacombe	1,932	–	–	–	–	1,830	3,762	75.4%	Elected on 1st count					UFA	UFA
Leduc	1,408	1,468	–	–	–	–	2,876	65.2%	Elected on 1st count					UFA	Lib
Lethbridge	–	–	–	2,036	–	2,603 (Note: W. D. L. Hardie received 1,598 votes; Robert Barrowman received 1,005 votes. Barrowman would be eliminated on the next count.)	4,639	67.1%	–	–	–	2,238	1,978	Lab	Lab
Little Bow	Acclamation													UFA	UFA
Macleod	1,539	800	–	–	–	–	2,339	76.2%	Elected on 1st count					UFA	UFA
Medicine Hat	–	1,774	1,150	–	–	935	3,859	74.1%	–	2,046	1,365	–	–	Lib	Lib
Nanton-Claresholm	1,415	–	733	–	–	–	2,148	65.4%	Elected on 1st count					New	UFA
Okotoks-High River	2,834	1,668	–	–	–	–	4,502	72.9%	Elected on 1st count					New	UFA
Olds	1,790	1,577	–	–	–	–	3,367	74.2%	Elected on 1st count					UFA	UFA
Peace River	1,331	–	–	–	–	795	2,126	47.7%	Elected on 1st count					UFA	UFA
Pembina	2,094	–	–	–	–	1,160	3,254	67.7%	Elected on 1st count					UFA	UFA
Pincher Creek	920	959	–	–	–	–	1,879	79.1%	Elected on 1st count					UFA	Lib
Ponoka	Acclamation													UFA	UFA
Red Deer	2,144	–	2,056	–	–	–	4,200	76.4%	Elected on 1st count					UFA	UFA
Ribstone	1,672	837	271	–	–	–	2,780	71.7%	Elected on 1st count					UFA	UFA
Rocky Mountain	–	–	–	820	783	1,604	3,207	66.5%	Elected on 1st count					Lab	Ind
St. Albert	1,427	1,161	–	–	–	–	2,588	80.0%	Elected on 1st count					Lib	UFA
St. Paul	1,635	1,653	–	–	–	–	3,288	71.9%	Elected on 1st count					UFA	Lib
Sedgewick	2,265	–	828	–	–	–	3,093	62.6%	Elected on 1st count					UFA	UFA
Stettler	1,934	761	1,147	–	–	–	3,842	70.7%	Elected on 1st count					UFA	UFA
Stony Plain	1,406	1,247	–	–	–	–	2,653	69.2%	Elected on 1st count					UFA	UFA
Sturgeon	2,556	1,129	–	–	–	–	3,685	63.0%	Elected on 1st count					UFA	UFA
Taber	1,848	–	–	–	–	1,516	3,364	72.2%	Elected on 1st count					UFA	UFA
Vegreville	2,364	1,757	–	–	–	–	4,121	72.9%	Elected on 1st count					UFA	UFA
Vermilion	2,551	815	–	–	–	–	3,366	62.3%	Elected on 1st count					UFA	UFA
Victoria	1,588	1,522	–	–	–	47	3,157	77.0%	Elected on 1st count					UFA	UFA
Wainwright	1,446	650	–	–	–	1,005	3,101	74.9%	1,564	–	–	–	1,254	UFA	UFA
Warner	1,342	709	–	–	–	–	2,051	70.7%	Elected on 1st count					UFA	UFA
Wetaskiwin	1,417	1,713	–	–	–	–	3,130	77.5%	Elected on 1st count					UFA	Lib
Whitford	1,799	766	–	–	–	47	2,612	59.8%	Elected on 1st count					UFA	UFA

= Open seat
= turnout is above provincial average
= Candidate was in previous Legislature
= Incumbent had switched allegiance
= Previously incumbent in another riding
= Not incumbent; was previously elected to the Legislature
= Incumbency arose from by-election gain
= previously an MP in the House of Commons of Canada
= Multiple candidates
= on judicial recount

=== Multi-member districts ===
District	Seats won (in order declared)
Calgary	
Edmonton	

UFA
Liberal
Conservative
Labour

= Candidate was in previous Legislature
= First-time MLA
= Previously incumbent in another district.

== STV analysis ==
=== Exhausted votes ===
Nine districts went beyond first-preference counts in order to determine winning candidates:

Exhausted votes (1930)
District	Counts		Exhausted	
District	1st preference	Final	Votes	% of 1st pref
Beaver River	2,136	2,068	68	3.18
Calgary	24,417	23,375	1,042	4.27
Clover Bar	2,896	2,577	319	11.02
Drumheller	2,698	2,121	577	21.38
Edmonton	21,189	19,546	1,643	7.75
Innisfail	2,725	2,509	216	7.93
Lethbridge	4,639	4,216	423	9.12
Medicine Hat	3,859	3,411	448	11.61
Wainwright	3,101	2,818	283	9.13

But of the remaining votes, 88 per cent were used to elect someone in Edmonton; 90 per cent were used to elect someone in Calgary; more than 50 per cent were used to elect the winner in each district outside Edmonton and Calgary.

=== Calgary ===
Electing six MLAs

Calgary (1930 Alberta general election)
Party	Candidate	FPv%	Count									
Party	Candidate	FPv%	1	2	3	4	5	6	7	8	9	10
Conservative	John Irwin	22.61%	5,520	3,489								
Liberal	George Webster	14.95%	3,651	3,651	3,489							
Liberal	John Bowlen	10.64%	2,598	2,667	2,700	2,711	2,721	2,727	2,821	2,823	2,869	3,588
Labour	Fred J. White	10.59%	2,585	2,659	2,673	2,874	2,916	3,335	3,515	3,489		
Conservative	Hugh Farthing	9.33%	2,279	2,957	2,966	2,979	2,994	3,001	3,132	3,133	3,731	3,731
Conservative	Harold McGill	6.69%	1,634	2,226	2,238	2,252	2,260	2,266	2,446	2,449	3,089	3,293
Independent	Robert Parkyn	6.32%	1,544	1,608	1,616	1,699	1,856	1,933	2,056	2,067	2,106	2,296
Liberal	Robert Weir	4.88%	1,191	1,260	1,328	1,339	1,344	1,359	1,502	1,508	1,579	
Conservative	H.S. Patterson	4.12%	1,007	1,368	1,374	1,382	1,395	1,405	1,480	1,480		
Independent	A.C. MacKay	4.06%	992	1,078	1,083	1,092	1,097	1,107				
Labour	W.E. Turner	2.35%	575	589	590	590	590					
Communist	John O'Sullivan	1.88%	460	469	469	469						
Labour	Thomas Vickers	1.56%	381	390	391							
Exhausted ballots		—	—	6	11	52	266	306	487	490	576	1,042
Electorate: 43,217 Valid: 24,417 Spoilt: 564 Quota: 3,489 Turnout: 57.80

The vote count proceeded in the following order:

- Irwin and Webster, having achieved the quota, were declared elected on the first count, and their excess amounts were distributed in 2nd and 3rd Count.
- Vickers, O'Sullivan and Turner were then eliminated in turn. (A candidate once eliminated or elected does not receive more votes.)
- MacKay was then eliminated. His vote transfer pushed White over the quota and he was declared elected.
- White's surplus votes were transferred
- Patterson was eliminated. His vote transfers pushed Farthing over the quota and he was declared elected. It was not necessary to allocate Farthing's surplus votes as it was less than the difference between the remaining candidates.
- Weir was eliminated. The transfers of his votes did not affect the order of popularity of the three remaining candidates. There were two remaining open seats. Bowlen and McGill, being the top two of the remaining three candidates, were declared elected. Parkyn was the only incumbent MLA to be defeated, and he was the only candidate who was not either elected or eliminated.

Calgary (1930 Alberta general election) (analysis of transferred votes, candidates ranked in order of 1st preference)
Party	Candidate	Maximum round	Maximum votes	Share in maximum round	Maximum votes First round votes Transfer votes
Conservative	John Irwin	1	5,520	22.61%	
Liberal	George Webster	1	3,651	14.95%	
Liberal	John Bowlen	10	3,588	15.35%	
Labour	Fred J. White	7	3,515	14.69%	
Conservative	Hugh Farthing	9	3,731	15.65%	
Conservative	Harold McGill	10	3,293	14.09%	
Independent	Robert Parkyn	10	2,296	9.82%	
Liberal	Robert Weir	9	1,579	6.62%	
Conservative	H.S. Patterson	7	1,480	6.18%	
Independent	A.C. MacKay	6	1,107	4.59%	
Labour	W.E. Turner	5	590	2.44%	
Communist	John O'Sullivan	4	469	1.92%	
Labour	Thomas Vickers	3	391	1.60%	
Exhausted votes			1,042	4.27%	

Initial terminal transfer rates for votes (1930)
Transferred from	Non-transferrable	% transferred to					Total
Transferred from	Non-transferrable	Conservative	Liberal	Labour	Independent	Communist	Total
█ Conservative (Irwin)	6	1,631	138	97	150	9	2,031
█ Conservative (Irwin)	0.30%	80.31%	6.79%	4.78%	7.39%	0.44%	100.00%
█ Independent (MacKay)	181	386	237	180	123	–	1,107
█ Independent (MacKay)	16.35%	34.87%	21.41%	16.26%	11.11%	–	100.00%
█ Liberal (Weir)	466	204	719	–	190	–	1,579
█ Liberal (Weir)	29.51%	12.92%	45.54%	–	12.03%	–	100.00%

=== Edmonton ===
Electing six MLAs

Edmonton (1930 Alberta general election)
Party	Candidate	FPv%	Count													
Party	Candidate	FPv%	1	2	3	4	5	6	7	8	9	10	11	12	13	14
United Farmers	John Lymburn	14.76%	3,230	3,028												
Conservative	David Duggan	12.18%	2,665	2,685	2,712	2,746	2,870	2,895	2,978	2,986	3,004	3,006	3,128	3,028		
Labour	Charles Gibbs	10.34%	2,262	2,300	2,306	2,371	2,391	2,423	2,439	2,660	3,148	3,028				
Conservative	Charles Weaver	9.20%	2,013	2,046	2,102	2,138	2,247	2,272	2,440	2,469	2,499	2,504	2,555	2,573	2,645	2,903
Liberal	William R. Howson	8.39%	1,835	1,857	1,865	1,897	1,922	2,054	2,094	2,123	2,152	2,155	2,181	2,187	2,778	2,915
Conservative	William Atkinson	8.16%	1,786	1,798	1,806	1,823	1,877	1,895	1,985	2,013	2,033	2,034	2,088	2,118	2,189	2,360
Liberal	Warren Prevey	6.08%	1,331	1,349	1,357	1,376	1,390	1,534	1,563	1,597	1,621	1,623	1,703	1,734	2,101	2,284
Liberal	James Collisson	4.75%	1,040	1,047	1,084	1,142	1,171	1,220	1,225	1,232	1,247	1,249	1,302	1,306		
Labour	Alfred Farmilo	3.80%	832	837	839	866	878	883	888	925	1,061	1,118	1,671	1,682	1,749	
Labour	Samuel Barnes	3.74%	818	826	826	841	845	852	870	914	1,004	1,052				
Communist	Jan Lakeman	3.44%	752	754	755	771	776	779	781							
Labour	Daniel Kennedy Knott	3.41%	745	756	759	776	787	800	809	889						
Conservative	N. C. Willson	2.06%	451	455	464	465	480	480								
Liberal	G. V. Pelton	2.02%	442	451	451	476	479									
Conservative	J. A. Buchanan	1.94%	424	426	430	438										
Independent	Joseph Clarke	1.71%	374	382	390											
Conservative	R. D. Tighe	0.86%	189	191												
Exhausted ballots		—	—	1	15	35	48	74	89	353	392	392	505	505	643	1,643
Electorate: 39,209 Valid: 21,189 Spoilt: 690 Quota: 3,028 Turnout: 55.80

Lymburn, Gibbs and Duncan were the only candidates that won by achieving the quota. Howson, Weaver and Atkinson won by attaining the three largest vote tallies of the four candidates still in the running in the final count.

Edmonton (1930 Alberta general election) (analysis of transferred votes, candidates ranked in order of 1st preference)
Party	Candidate	Maximum round	Maximum votes	Share in maximum round	Maximum votes First round votes Transfer votes
UFA	John Lymburn	1	3,230	15.24%	
Conservative	David Duggan	11	3,128	15.12%	
Labour	Charles Gibbs	9	3,148	15.14%	
Conservative	Charles Weaver	14	2,903	14.85%	
Liberal	William R. Howson	14	2,915	14.91%	
Conservative	William Atkinson	14	2,360	12.07%	
Liberal	Warren Prevey	14	2,284	11.69%	
Liberal	James Collisson	12	1,306	6.31%	
Labour	Alfred Farmilo	13	1,749	8.51%	
Labour	Samuel Barnes	10	1,052	5.06%	
Communist	Jan Lakeman	7	781	3.70%	
Labour	Daniel Kennedy Knott	8	889	4.27%	
Conservative	N. C. Willson	6	480	2.27%	
Liberal	G. V. Pelton	5	479	2.27%	
Conservative	J. A. Buchanan	4	438	2.07%	
Independent	Joseph Clarke	3	390	1.84%	
Conservative	R. D. Tighe	2	191	0.90%	
Exhausted votes			1,643	7.75%	

Initial terminal transfer rates for votes (1930)
Transferred from	Non-transferrable	% transferred to					Total
Transferred from	Non-transferrable	Conservative	Liberal	Labour	Independent	Communist	Total
█ United Farmers (Lymburn)	1	73	56	62	8	2	202
█ United Farmers (Lymburn)	0.50%	36.14%	27.72%	30.69%	3.96%	0.99%	100.00%
█ Conservative (Tighe)	14	104	53	11	8	1	191
█ Conservative (Tighe)	7.33%	54.45%	27.75%	5.76%	4.19%	0.52%	100.00%
█ Independent (Clarke)	20	96	134	124	–	16	390
█ Independent (Clarke)	5.13%	24.62%	34.36%	31.79%	–	4.10%	100.00%
█ Liberal (Pelton)	26	68	325	57	–	3	479
█ Liberal (Pelton)	5.43%	14.20%	67.85%	11.90%	–	0.63%	100.00%
█ Communist (Lakeman)	264	65	70	382	–	–	781
█ Communist (Lakeman)	33.80%	8.32%	8.96%	48.91%	–	–	100.00%
█ Labour (Knott)	39	68	68	714	–	–	889
█ Labour (Knott)	4.39%	7.65%	7.65%	80.31%	–	–	100.00%
