= 1923 Edmonton municipal election =

Municipal election in Alberta, Canada

The 1923 municipal election was held December 10, 1923 to elect a mayor and six aldermen to sit on Edmonton City Council and four trustees to sit on the public school board. Robert Crossland, Paul Jenvrin, Thomas Magee, and Joseph Henri Picard were acclaimed to two-year terms on the separate school board.

There were ten aldermen on city council, but four of the positions were already filled: Joseph Adair, James Collisson, Daniel Knott, and Rice Sheppard (SS) were all elected to two-year terms in 1922 and were still in office. Kenneth Alexander Blatchford had also been elected to a two-year term in 1922, but had resigned in order to run for mayor. Accordingly, William Rea was elected to a one-year term.

There were seven trustees on the public school board, but three of the positions were already filled: W. H. Alexander, L. T. Barclay, and Mrs. E. T. (Thyrza) Bishop had all been elected to two-year terms in 1922 and were still in office. The same was true on the separate board, where P M Dunne, J J Murray (SS), and Joseph Gariépy were continuing.

In line with the result of an electoral reform plebiscite conducted during the 1922 election, the 1923 election was the first to make use of the single transferable vote election system to elect councillors. The system used a city-wide district as had been in use before. The difference was now that each voter would have just one vote and the voter would mark back-up preferences on a preferential ballot. The system ensured that both Independent (business) candidates and Labour candidates were elected and that the most-popular candidates in each slate were elected. Less counting of votes was involved compared to the previous years' elections because each voter could cast just one vote in the aldermanic contest, instead of six votes each as had been the case under plurality block voting.

As another part of the electoral reform done at this time, the mayor was elected through instant-runoff voting. This combination of STV and IRV would be used through 1927.

== Voter turnout ==
There were 13,016 votes cast out of 22,077 eligible voters, for a voter turnout of 58.9%.

The number of spoiled votes was higher than any previous election but its exact number is unclear. It seems though that their presence did not have an impact on the fairness of the election.

The number of spoiled votes varied from the mayoral and the aldermanic contests. At least 1200 were spoiled in the aldermanic contest, where the number of candidates was larger than the mayoral contest. Some of the spoiled votes were ballots improperly filled out (such as with an X instead of a number showing ranking), but some were declared spoiled for contests where the pertinent part of the ballot was simply left blank, such as no first-choice preference being marked for mayor or no first-choice preference was marked for an alderman. The number of spoiled ballots was larger than any previous city election but due to the use of STV in the aldermanic election, the final result in this election meant that only 3494 voters (out of 11,851) did not see their first choice elected.

== Results ==
- bold or ✓ indicates elected
- italics indicate incumbent
- "SS", where data is available, indicates representative for Edmonton's South Side, with a minimum South Side representation instituted after the city of Strathcona, south of the North Saskatchewan River, amalgamated into Edmonton on February 1, 1912.

=== Mayor ===
Party	Candidate	Votes	%	Elected
Independent	Kenneth Alexander Blatchford	8,314	65.28%	✓
Independent	James Ramsey	4,421	34.72%	

=== Aldermen ===
Six seats open. 11,851 valid votes. Each voter had one vote.

Quota of votes was 1693. This number guaranteed election but it was possible to be elected with fewer.

Two southside candidates had to be elected.

Party	Candidate	Initial votes		Elected
Labour	James East	3,004		✓
Independent	Ambrose Bury	1,993		✓
Independent	William Rea	1,150		✓
Independent	James McCrie Douglas	928	SS	✓
Independent	Thomas Ducey	789		
Labour	James Findlay	707		✓
Independent	Archie Rendall	703		
Independent	Joseph Duggan	563	SS	✓
Independent	J. J. McKenzie	420	SS	
Independent	Esther Saunders*	380		
Independent	J. Boyd McBride	317		
Independent	A. K. Putland	312	SS	
Labour	H. J. Pallot	308		
Labour	Jan Lakeman	265	SS	

14 candidates ran for the six seats open this year.

10 counts were required to see all the seats filled under the STV/PR system in use.

As votes were transferred in the nine counts that followed the first count, the candidates' relative popularity changed. Ducey and Rendall received many initial votes but did not get quota and did not get enough votes in later counts to get a seat.

Rea was third in the first count but did not receive many vote transfers and eventually was declared elected to serve one-year term, the consolation prize. He was the least popular (last elected) of the northside candidates.

As seen in the above vote tallies, the front runners in the first count were mixed, belonging to both Independent (business) and Labour slates. This was the result of single voting in a multi-member district.

East and Bury were elected on first count, receiving quota. Their surplus votes were transferred to prevent waste and to ensure rough proportionality of the election result.

The second count was the distribution of East's surplus votes. Findlay received enough vote transfers from East to achieve quota on the 2nd count.

The 3rd count was transfer of Bury's surplus votes. The 4th count was transfer of Findlay's surplus votes.

Then the least-popular candidates were eliminated one by one until the next seat was filled. Lakeman, Pallot, Putnam, McBride, Saunders and McKenzie were eliminated before that happened.

Rea achieved quota on the 10th count to take a seat. His surplus votes were not transferred because the field of candidates was such that the remaining seat would be immediately filled.

Rea's election left only two seats empty (and four candidates still standing).

Northsiders Thomas Ducey and Rendall, and two southside candidates were left standing by this point.

No southsiders had been elected so the two remaining seats had to be filled by southsiders.

Rendall and Ducey were eliminated, there being no northside seats left to win.

The two southside candidates (Douglas and Duggan) were allocated seats to fill the two vacancies for guaranteed southside representation, as was announced the next day.

There was no business slate per se.

On the other hand, the Labour element of the city put forward Labour Party candidates. But the STV election process did not involve parties. Voters cast votes directly for individual candidates.

East and Findlay were newly elected Labour candidates. Rice Sheppard and Dan Knott were sitting labour councillors and had one more year in their terms so Labour, with four seats, had good representation in the 1924 city council. Through the next several city elections, held using STV, Labour maintained its grip on the four seats, a very dependable result produced by a dependable scientific method.

Other than the change produced by the southside quota, all the candidates in winning positions in the first count were elected by the end after transfers, but single voting in multi-winner contest assured that each party received its due share of seats.

=== Public school trustees ===
Four seats needed to be filled in this election. Each voter cast one vote as per STV.

Party	Candidate	Initial votes		Elected
Labour	Samuel Barnes	3,239		✓
Independent	F. S. McPherson	1,769		✓
Labour	Frank Crang	1,740	SS	✓
Independent	Ralph Bellamy	1,643		✓
Independent	George Steer	1,054		
Labour	Robert McCreath	1,015		
Independent	George Massey	442		

The necessary quota to win a seat was 2183 (the total of votes divided by five, plus one).

Barnes achieved this in first count to get a seat.

Enough of his surplus went to Frank Crang who thus got a seat in the second count.

Bellamy and McPherson were elected in the fifth count, held after Massey and Steer had been eliminated, their second choices being distributed.

McCreath, who had picked up many votes in the second and third counts (thus moving up from the bottom of the pack where candidates were being eliminated), was dropped off in the fifth count, leaving only two candidates left to fill the two remaining slots, thus Bellamy and McPherson were elected.

The four candidates in winning positions were elected in the end after transfers, but the single voting in multi-winner contest ensured that both parties were represented among them.

=== Separate (Catholic) school trustees ===
Robert Crossland (SS), Paul Jenvrin, Thomas Magee, and Joseph Henri Picard were acclaimed.
