= 1919 Edmonton municipal election =

Municipal election in Alberta, Canada

The 1919 municipal election was held December 8, 1919 to elect a mayor and five aldermen to sit on Edmonton City Council and four trustees to sit on the public school board. T P Malone, Paul Janvrin, T S Magee, and Joseph Henri Picard were acclaimed to two-year terms on the separate school board. In the election's only plebiscite, Edmontonians rejected a proposal to pay their aldermen.

There were ten aldermen on city council, but five of the positions were already filled: Charles Hepburn, Samuel McCoppen, Henri Martin, John McKenzie, and Andrew McLennan were all elected to two-year terms in 1918 and were still in office.

This election was held just a few months after the general strike so feelings were high. With the election of Labour candidates Clarke, Kinney, East and Sheppard plus the continuing alderman McCoppen, Labour held five of the 11 seats on council following this election.

There were seven trustees on the public school board, but three of the positions were already filled: Joseph Duggan, Frank Crang, and William Rea had all been elected to two-year terms in 1918 and were still in office. The same was true on the separate board, where J J Murray, Joseph Driscoll, and Joseph Gariépy were continuing.

== Voter turnout ==
11213 voters cast ballots. There were 15378 eligible voters, for a voter turnout of 72.9%.

== Results ==
- bold or ✓ indicates elected
- italics indicate incumbent
- "SS", where data is available, indicates representative for Edmonton's South Side, with a minimum South Side representation instituted after the city of Strathcona, south of the North Saskatchewan River, amalgamated into Edmonton on February 1, 1912.

=== Mayor ===
Party	Candidate	Votes	%
Labour	Joseph Clarke	6,509	59.52%
Citizens' Committee	Matthew Easdale	4,427	40.48%

=== Aldermen ===
Each voter could cast up to five votes.

Party	Candidate	Votes		Elected
Labour	James Kinney	5,513		✓
Labour	James East	4,847		✓
Labour	Rice Sheppard	4,644		✓
Citizens' Committee	Percy Abbott	4,233	SS	✓
Citizens' Committee	John Bowen	4,093	SS	✓
Citizens' Committee	George H. Scott	3,835		
Labour	James Findlay	3,775		
Labour	J. J. Murray	3,696		
Citizens' Committee	Valentine Richards	3,524		
Citizens' Committee	Charles Grant	3,230		
Independent	Charles G. Davidson	2,982		
Independent	Joseph Adair	2,356		

=== Public school trustees ===
Party	Candidate	Votes
Labour	J. A. McPherson	5,682
Labour	Samuel Barnes	5,669
Labour	J. W. H. Williams	4,099
Labour	Frank Scott	4,012
Independent	Mrs. Howey	3,945
Independent	Henry Douglas	3,944
Independent	Walter Ramsey	3,829
Independent	E. T. Bishop	3,278

=== Separate (Catholic) school trustees ===
Party	Candidate	Votes
Independent	Thomas Malone	acclaimed
Independent	Paul Janvrin	acclaimed
Independent	T. S. Magee	acclaimed
Independent	Joseph Henri Picard	acclaimed

=== Plebiscite ===
Are you in favour of paying each member of the Council the sum of $10.00 for each meeting of the Council attended by him during his term of office, and for each Committee meeting so attended $5.00. Provided that the total sum payable to any member shall not be greater than $1,000.00 during any year, nor more than $100.00 during any month.
	Votes	%
Yes	4,152	41.84%
No	5,771	58.16%
