= Jeremiah Heffernan =

Canadian politician (1884-1969)

Jeremiah Wilfred Heffernan
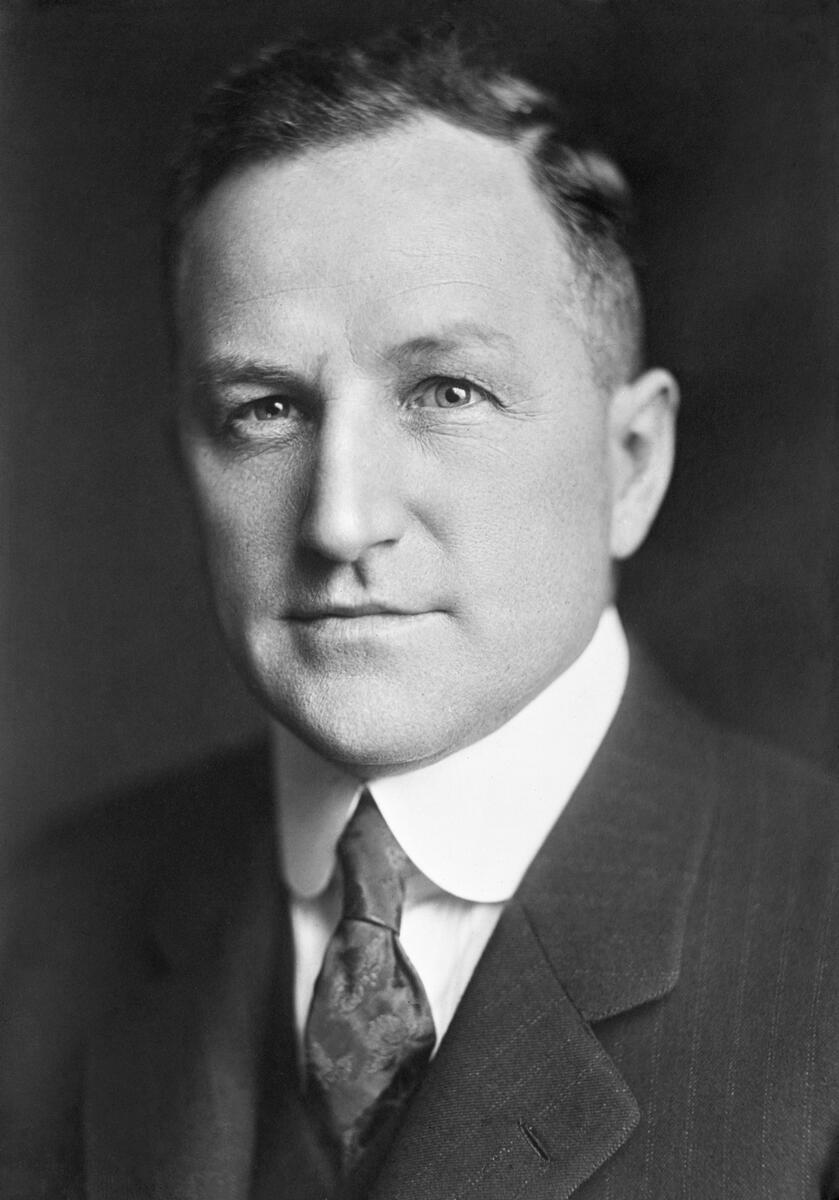

Member of the Legislative Assembly of Alberta
- In office July 18, 1921 – June 28, 1926 Serving with John Bowen, John Boyle, Nellie McClung, William Henry and Andrew McLennan
- Succeeded by: John Lymburn, Charles Gibbs, Warren Prevey, David Duggan and Charles Weaver
- Constituency: Edmonton

Personal details
- Born: January 4, 1884 Picton, Ontario, Canada
- Died: September 21, 1969 (aged 85)
- Party: Liberal
- Occupation: politician

Jeremiah Wilfred Heffernan was a provincial politician from Alberta, Canada. He served as a member of the Legislative Assembly of Alberta from 1921 to 1926 sitting with the Liberal caucus in opposition.

== Political career ==
Heffernan ran for a seat to the Alberta Legislature as a Liberal candidate in the Edmonton electoral district in the 1921 Alberta general election. He won the fifth place seat to complete the sweep of Liberal candidates in that district despite his party losing government that election.
