= Andrew Robert McLennan =

Canadian businessman and politician (1871–1943)

City of Edmonton Alderman
- In office December 9, 1918 – 1922

Member of the Legislative Assembly of Alberta
- In office July 18, 1921 – October 15, 1925 Serving with John Bowen, John Boyle, Nellie McClung, William Henry and Jeremiah Heffernan
- Succeeded by: John Lymburn, Charles Gibbs, Warren Prevey, David Duggan and Charles Weaver
- Constituency: Edmonton

Personal details
- Born: July 11, 1871 Walkerton, Ontario
- Died: April 9, 1943 (aged 71)
- Party: Alberta Liberal
- Other political affiliations: federal Liberal
- Occupation: business man and politician

Andrew Robert McLennan (July 11, 1871 – April 9, 1943) was a business man and politician from Alberta, Canada. He served as a member of Edmonton City Council from 1918 to 1922 and also served as a member of the Legislative Assembly of Alberta from 1921 to 1925 sitting with the Liberal caucus in opposition.

== Early life ==
Born in Ontario on July 11, 1871, he came to Edmonton in 1912 where he opened a lumberyard. He also helped operate a general store under the name Pray and McLennan.

== Political career ==
=== Municipal politics ===
McLennan began his political career on the municipal level. He ran for a seat to Edmonton City Council in the 1918 Edmonton municipal election. He won the fifth place seat to earn his first term in office. He ran for a second term in the 1920 Edmonton municipal election this time winning the second place seat. McLennan resigned his municipal council seat in 1921 when he was elected to the Alberta Legislature.

=== Provincial politics ===
McLennan ran for a seat to the Alberta Legislature in the 1921 Alberta general election. He stood as a Liberal candidate in the electoral district of Edmonton. He headed the polls taking first place in what would be a sweep by the Liberal slate among the 26 candidates.

McLennan resigned his seat on October 15, 1925, to attempt to run for a seat in the House of Commons of Canada as a Liberal candidate in the 1925 Canadian federal election in the electoral district of Edmonton East. He was defeated by Conservative candidate Ambrose Bury, finishing second in a three-way race.
