= Kenny Blatchford =

Canadian politician (1882–1933)

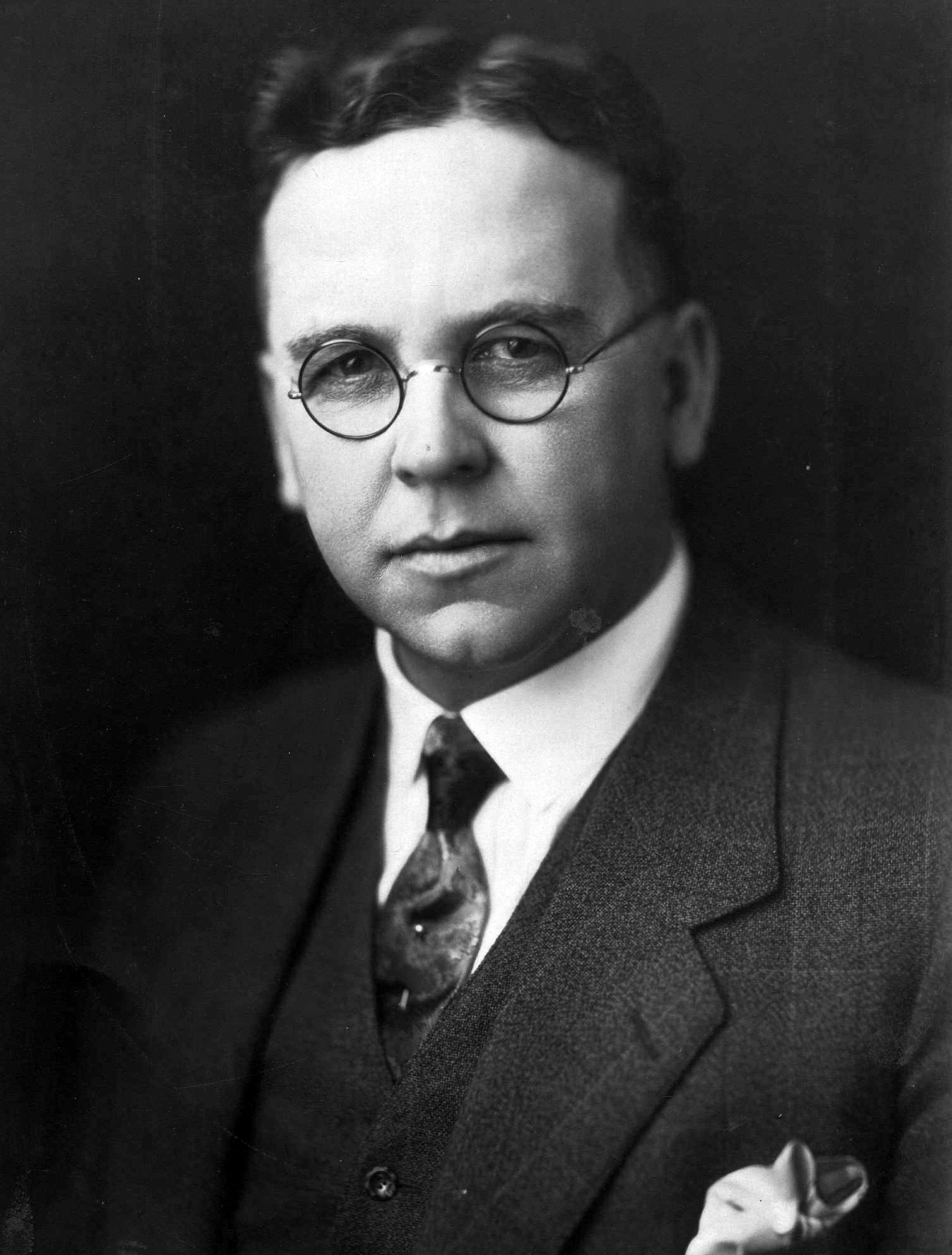

Member of the House of Commons of Canada for Edmonton East
- In office September 14, 1926 – July 28, 1930
- Preceded by: Ambrose Bury
- Succeeded by: Ambrose Bury

17th Mayor of Edmonton
- In office December 10, 1923 – December 13, 1926
- Preceded by: David Duggan
- Succeeded by: Ambrose Bury

Alderman on the Edmonton City Council
- In office December 12, 1921 – December 10, 1923

Personal details
- Born: March 5, 1882 Minnedosa, Manitoba, Canada
- Died: April 20, 1933 (aged 51) Edmonton, Alberta, Canada
- Party: Liberal Party of Canada, Citizens League
- Spouse: Grace Lauder Walker
- Children: Two sons (including Howard Peter Blatchford) and one daughter
- Profession: Businessman

Kenneth Alexander Blatchford (March 5, 1882 – April 20, 1933) was a Canadian politician who served both as the mayor of Edmonton, Alberta and as a member of the House of Commons of Canada.

== Early life ==
Kenny Blatchford was born in Minnedosa, Manitoba. He was educated at a commercial college. As a youth, he was also an excellent wrestler and all-around athlete .

He moved to Edmonton with his parents by ox-cart during the 1890s, and began selling newspapers. During the Klondike Gold Rush, he took over operation of the grist mill operated by Daniel Fraser, and later worked in the Edmonton Power Plant. He married Grace Lauder Walker on 19 December 1904, with whom he had two sons and a daughter.

Kenny Blatchford was a member of the Presbyterian Church in Canada.

== Municipal politics ==
Blatchford first sought public office in the 1921 municipal election, when he was elected to Edmonton City Council for a one-year term as an alderman, finishing fifth out of seventeen candidates. While the top five candidates were to have been elected to two year terms, with the sixth and seventh-place finishers winning one year terms, Bickerton Pratt, who finished seventh, won a two-year term by virtue of being from the south side of the North Saskatchewan River, due to the guaranteed southside representation; resultingly, Blatchford won only a one-year term.

He was re-elected, this time to a two-year term, in the 1922 election, in which he finished third of sixteen candidates. He resigned midway through his term to run for mayor in the 1923 election, in which he handily defeated James Ramsey. He was re-elected with relative ease in the 1924 and 1925 elections, and did not seek re-election thereafter.

As mayor, Blatchford convinced the city to purchase a farm to establish an "air harbour", which later became the Edmonton City Centre (Blatchford Field) Airport.

After his federal political career faltered, Blatchford attempted a return to municipal office by running for mayor in the 1932 election. However, he finished a distant third of three candidates, behind incumbent Daniel Kennedy Knott and perennial candidate (and former and future mayor) Joseph Clarke.

== Federal politics ==
While still mayor, Blatchford ran for the House of Commons of Canada in the 1926 election as a Liberal in Edmonton East. He defeated incumbent Conservative Member of Parliament Ambrose Bury by fewer than two hundred votes.

He served until 1930, when he was defeated by Bury (who had gone on to succeed Blatchford as mayor of Edmonton) in that year's election.

== Death and legacy ==
Five months after his defeat in the 1932 mayoral election, Blatchford suffered a nervous breakdown and disappeared. His body was found in the North Saskatchewan River on April 22, 1933, after he had been missing for two days. His death was ruled a suicide.

His son, Howard Peter "Cowboy" Blatchford went on to become a flying ace in the Royal Canadian Air Force during the Second World War.

Blatchford Field, location of the former Edmonton City Centre Airport, was named after Kenny Blatchford. The carbon neutral community of Blatchford, which is being developed on the grounds of the former airport, is named in his honour.

== See also ==
- 1921 Edmonton municipal election
- 1922 Edmonton municipal election
- 1923 Edmonton municipal election
- 1924 Edmonton municipal election
- 1925 Edmonton municipal election
- 1932 Edmonton municipal election
- 16th Canadian Parliament
