= Ambrose Bury =

Canadian politician (1869–1951)

Ambrose Bury KC
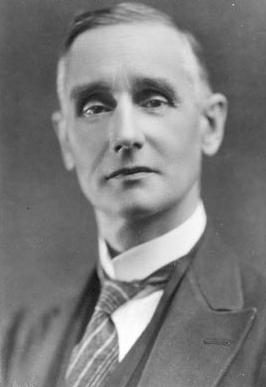

Member of the House of Commons of Canada for Edmonton East
- In office 29 October 1925 – 14 September 1926
- Preceded by: Donald Ferdinand Kellner
- Succeeded by: Kenny Blatchford
- In office 28 July 1930 – 13 October 1935
- Preceded by: Kenny Blatchford
- Succeeded by: William Samuel Hall

18th Mayor of Edmonton
- In office 13 December 1926 – 9 December 1929
- Preceded by: Kenny Blatchford
- Succeeded by: James McCrie Douglas

Alderman on the Edmonton City Council
- In office 12 December 1921 – 29 October 1925
- Succeeded by: James McCrie Douglas

Personal details
- Born: Ambrose Upton Gledstanes Bury; 1 August 1869 County Kildare, Ireland
- Died: 29 March 1951 (aged 81) Ottawa, Ontario
- Party: Conservative Party of Canada, Citizens League, Independent
- Other political affiliations: Conservative Party of Alberta
- Spouse: Amy Beatrice Owen
- Children: One son
- Education: Trinity College Dublin
- Profession: Lawyer

Ambrose Upton Gledstanes Bury, KC (1 August 1869 – 29 March 1951) was a politician in Alberta, Canada, a mayor of Edmonton, and a Conservative member of the House of Commons of Canada.

== Early life ==
Ambrose Bury was born in Downings House, County Kildare, Ireland on 1 August 1869. The son of Charles Michael Bury and Margaret (Aylmer) Bury, among his siblings, were Charles Arthur Bury, Rev. Reginald Victor Bury, Rev. Fenton Ernest Bury, and Dr. Frederick William Bury.

He was educated at the Liverpool Institute, the Royal School in Raphoe, Dublin High School, Trinity College Dublin, and the King's Inns in Dublin, from which he received a Bachelor of Arts in 1890 and a Master of Arts in 1893. He taught theology and was the first principal of the Irish Baptist College in 1892.

He married Margaret Amy Beatrice Owen, from England, on 16 June 1897, with whom he had one son, William Bury.

He was called to the Irish Bar in 1906, and practiced law in Ireland before emigrating to Edmonton in 1912. The following year, he was admitted to the Law Society of Alberta. He practiced law as a partner of Ewing, Harvie & Bury (later Harvie, Bury & Yanda), and was chancellor of the Anglican diocese at Athabasca from 1919.

== Political career ==
Bury's first attempt at public office was running for the Legislative Assembly of Alberta in the 1921 provincial election as a Conservative in Edmonton. He was unsuccessful, coming in fourteenth of twenty-six candidates (five were elected).

Later that year, in the 1921 municipal election, Bury was elected to the Edmonton City Council for a two-year term as alderman, finishing fourth of nineteen candidates in a race in which the top seven candidates were elected.

He was re-elected to another two-year term in the 1923 election.

Towards the end of his second term on council, Bury was elected to the House of Commons of Canada as a Conservative in the riding of Edmonton East in the 1925 election. Parliament was dissolved the following year, and Bury was narrowly defeated in the ensuing election by Liberal (and incumbent mayor of Edmonton) Kenny Blatchford.

Blatchford had taken his job, and Bury set out to take Blatchford's, and was elected mayor in the 1926 election. He defeated Daniel Kennedy Knott (who went on to become mayor himself after Bury left municipal politics).

He was re-elected in 1927 and 1928. He did not seek re-election in 1929, preparing for a rematch against Blatchford in the next federal election.

Bury defeated Blatchford by a substantial margin in the 1930 election as R. B. Bennett's Conservative government swept to power. Following Bury's election as a Member of Parliament in 1930, the K.K.K. in Edmonton celebrated his election with a cross burning. The Edmonton Journal has written that the K.K.K. "erected a flaming cross on the hill above Riverdale flats to celebrate the victory of Edmonton East candidate Ambrose Bury."

Bury did not seek re-election in the 1935 election.

He was appointed as a district court judge that year, and served in that capacity until he reached the retirement age of 75 in 1944.

== Later life and death ==
In 1946, Bury's wife died, and Bury moved to England to live with his brother. He died in Ottawa 29 March 1951. His funeral was held in Edmonton, and he was buried in the Edmonton Cemetery.

Bury had been an active Freemason.

Political offices
Preceded by Kenny Blatchford	Mayor of Edmonton; 1926–1929	Succeeded by James McCrie Douglas
Parliament of Canada
Preceded by Donald Ferdinand Kellner	Member of Parliament Edmonton East; 1925–1926	Succeeded by Kenny Blatchford
Preceded by Kenny Blatchford	Member of Parliament Edmonton East; 1930–1935	Succeeded by William Samuel Hall
