= Charles Yardley Weaver =

Canadian politician, barrister, and soldier

Colonel (Retired) Charles Yardley Weaver DSO VD KC MLA
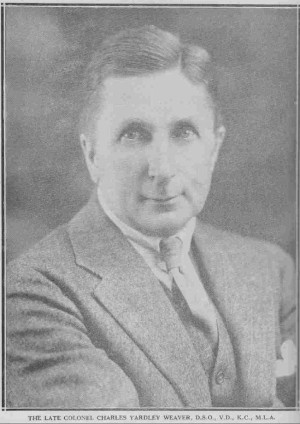

City of Edmonton Alderman
- In office December 12, 1921 – December 10, 1923 Serving with Aldermen elected in 1921

Member of the Legislative Assembly of Alberta
- In office June 28, 1926 – October 1, 1930
- Preceded by: John Bowen, Jeremiah Heffernan, William Henry, Nellie McClung and Andrew McLennan
- Succeeded by: Frederick Jamieson
- Constituency: Edmonton

Personal details
- Born: June 9, 1884 Liverpool, England
- Died: October 1, 1930 (aged 46) Edmonton, Alberta
- Party: Conservative
- Occupation: Politician, lawyer, justice of the peace and soldier
- Awards: Distinguished Service Order

Military service
- Allegiance: Canada
- Branch/service: Canadian Expeditionary Force
- Years of service: 1914–1918
- Rank: Colonel
- Unit: 49th Battalion

Charles Yardley Weaver DSO VD KC MLA (June 9, 1884 – October 1, 1930) was a Canadian politician, barrister, justice of the peace and soldier from Alberta. He held office on both municipal and provincial levels of government. He served as an alderman on Edmonton City Council from 1921 to 1923 and later as a member of the Legislative Assembly of Alberta from 1926 until his death in 1930, sitting with the Conservative caucus in opposition.

== Early life ==
Charles Yardley Weaver was born June 9, 1884, at Liverpool, England, to Thomas Charles Weaver and Louisa Jane Pipe. He moved to Canada in 1903, and on January 15, 1909, married Dorothy Mary Cobbett and had three children together. Weaver was appointed as a justice of the peace on November 12, 1914. He became a barrister.

At the outbreak of World War I in 1914 Weaver joined the Canadian Expeditionary Force. He held the rank of major and ended up being promoted to colonel by the time his service was finished in 1918. Weaver was a member of the 49th Battalion. He was wounded in action on three separate occasions. Weaver was awarded the Distinguished Service Order for his service in the war.

== Political career ==
=== Municipal ===
Weaver ran for a seat to Edmonton City Council in the 1921 Edmonton municipal election. He won the first place seat out of seven to head the polls and earn a two-year term in office.

Weaver did not run for a second municipal term in 1923. The City of Edmonton named two streets in his honour in 1988: Weaver Drive and Weaver Point.

=== Provincial ===
Weaver ran for a seat to the Alberta Legislature as a candidate under the Conservative banner in the 1926 Alberta general election. He received enough votes to top the vote threshold (the quota that under single transferable voting was the requirement to take a seat) and won a seat on the first count in the 6th Alberta Legislature. Weaver ran for re-election in the 1930 Alberta general election. He held on to his seat, winning the fifth of the six seats in late vote transfers.

Shortly after the election, Weaver died suddenly of a heart attack at his home in Edmonton at approximately 7:30 pm on October 1, 1930. The city of Edmonton named two streets in his honour in 1988: Weaver Drive and Weaver Point.
