= Joseph Adair =

Canadian politician (1877–1960)

Joseph Woods Adair
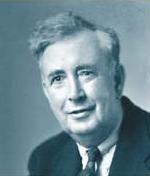

Alderman on the Edmonton City Council
- In office December 13, 1920 – December 8, 1924

Personal details
- Born: 1877 Glasgow, Scotland
- Died: November 1, 1960 (aged 82–83)
- Party: Citizens Progressive League, Citizens League
- Other political affiliations: Citizens Committee, Independent
- Spouse: Dorothy Tremblay (deceased August 16, 1960)
- Children: Two sons, two daughters
- Profession: Printer

Joseph Woods Adair (1877 – November 1, 1960) was a politician in Alberta, Canada, a municipal councillor in Edmonton, and a candidate for election to the Legislative Assembly of Alberta.

== Biography ==
Joseph Adair was born in Glasgow, Scotland in 1877. He apprenticed as a printer in Glasgow and came to Canada in 1899. He worked for newspapers in Toronto and Winnipeg before settling in Edmonton in 1906 to work for Frank Oliver's Edmonton Bulletin. He founded his own linotyping business in 1911, which he would operate until his retirement in 1946. He also produced a throwaway sheet called Town Topics.

In 1914, he ran for mayor but was defeated handily by William Thomas Henry. In 1915 he ran once again for city council, this time as an alderman, but was again defeated, finishing twelfth of fourteen. He would make one more unsuccessful effort at election (running for alderman in 1919 and finishing last of twelve candidates) before being elected in 1920, finishing first of sixteen candidates.

While serving as an alderman, Adair ran for the Legislative Assembly of Alberta in the 1921 election as an independent in the riding of Edmonton. He was defeated, placing twelfth of twenty-six candidates.

He was re-elected as an alderman at the end of his two-year term in 1922, but did not seek re-election in 1924. Instead, he ran for the public school board that election, and finished first of seven candidates.

In 1925 Adair made his second bid for election as mayor. He finished fifth of six candidates. Attempts to return to office as an alderman would follow in 1929, 1936, and 1941. All were unsuccessful, as his best showing was in his last election when he finished eleventh of fourteen candidates.

Joseph Adair was known as an outstanding speaker, and was nicknamed "Edmonton's Silver-Tongued Orator". He served on the Library Board and the Exhibition Board for forty years. He and his wife, Dorothy (née Trembley) had two sons and two daughters.

Joseph Woods Adair died November 1, 1960.
