= James McCrie Douglas =

Canadian politician

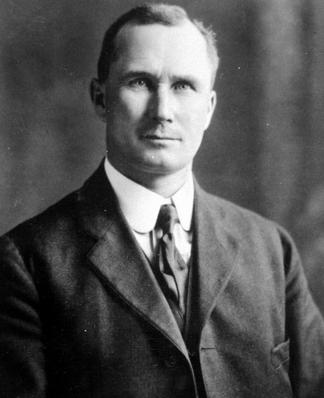

19th Mayor of Edmonton
- In office 9 December 1929 – 11 November 1931
- Preceded by: Ambrose Bury
- Succeeded by: Dan Knott

Alderman on the Edmonton City Council
- In office 10 December 1923 – 13 December 1926
- In office 12 November 1941 – 2 November 1949

Member of the House of Commons of Canada for Strathcona
- In office 20 October 1909 – 6 December 1921
- Preceded by: Wilbert McIntyre
- Succeeded by: Daniel Webster Warner

Personal details
- Born: 5 February 1867 Middleville, Lanark County, Ontario
- Died: 16 March 1950 (aged 83) Edmonton, Alberta
- Party: Liberal Party of Canada, Unionist Party, Conservative Party of Canada, Civic Government Association, Citizens Committee
- Spouse: Mary Cameron Bickerton
- Profession: Businessman

James McCrie Douglas (5 February 1867 – 16 March 1950) was a politician in Alberta, Canada, a mayor of Edmonton, and a member of Parliament serving in the House of Commons of Canada from 1909 to 1921.

== Early life ==
Douglas was born 5 February 1867 in Middleville, Lanark County, Ontario, the son of Rev James Douglas, a Scottish Presbyterian minister and Margaret, née Blyth. He was educated in Winnipeg, and came to Strathcona, Alberta in 1894, where he opened a mercantile business with his brother R. B. Douglas. Their business at 10402 Whyte Avenue was a local landmark for years until a fire destroyed it in 1913.

On 1 November 1894 he married Mary Cameron Bickerton.

== Political career ==
James Douglas served in municipal and federal governments in a political career lasting 40 years.

Douglas was elected as an alderman to the Strathcona city council.

He entered federal politics in 1909 in a by-election that followed the death of Wilbert McIntyre, the recently elected Liberal Member of Parliament for Strathcona. Douglas, running as a Liberal, was the only candidate in the by-election, and was acclaimed to the House of Commons of Canada. He was re-elected as a Liberal in the 1911 election.

In 1917, Prime Minister Robert Laird Borden introduced conscription as a means of strengthening Canada's war effort in the First World War. He appealed to all MPs who supported this move to come together under the banner of the "Unionist Party". Douglas was one of many MPs to leave Wilfrid Laurier's Liberal caucus and join this new grand-alliance "Union" government. He was re-elected as a government candidate in the 1917 election. Conscription became unpopular among many in the West when it was extended to hard-pressed farm families in 1918.

Once the war ended, he was one of a handful of former Liberals to join Arthur Meighen's new "National Liberal and Conservative Party" (commonly known as the Conservative Party). He was defeated running under this banner in the 1921 election by Progressive/United Farmers candidate Daniel Webster Warner.

Douglas returned to municipal politics, running for Edmonton City Council (Strathcona and Edmonton had merged in 1912) as an alderman in the 1923 election. The election elected six city councillors at-large through single transferable voting and Douglas received the fourth most votes initially. He never did achieve quota but was elected in the end through the guaranteed representation for southside candidates. Douglas was elected to a two-year term.

Towards the end of this term, he again made a foray into federal politics, running in the 1925 election as a Conservative in Edmonton West. He was defeated by former Liberal premier Charles Stewart.

After this federal rebuff, Douglas sought and won re-election as an alderman in Edmonton's 1925 election, the most popular of eleven candidates in the multi-seat aldermanic election. He resigned less than a year into his term to run for mayor in the 1926 election, in which he was the fifth most-popular of six candidates.

In the 1929, he ran again for mayor and this time was elected. He was acclaimed in 1930 to a second term as mayor. During his time as mayor local KKK organizer J.J. Maloney asked mayor Douglas for permission to use the large city auditorium for his group's events. Douglas refused the necessary approval.

In the next election, Maloney backed Douglas's only opponent Daniel Kennedy Knott and Douglas was unseated.

Douglas took a five-year hiatus from politics to serve as a stipendary magistrate in the Northwest Territories. During this time, he was also appointed by the Alberta government to the Royal Commission on the Condition of the Halfbreed Population of the Province of Alberta (Ewing Commission) along with members Albert Ewing and Dr. Edward A. Brathwaite to look at issues affecting the Métis population including land claims, hunting rights and treaty status. The commission would deliver its findings later in 1936.

Douglas returned to Edmonton to run for mayor in the 1936 election, in which he finished a close second to Joseph Clarke in a five-person race. He left politics once again after this defeat, but returned to the position of alderman in the 1941 election, finishing second of fourteen candidates. He was re-elected in 1943 (finishing first of twelve candidates), 1945 (first of eleven), and 1947 (third of thirteen) before retiring for good in 1949.

== Personal life, death, and legacy ==
James Douglas was a director of the Edmonton Exhibition Association, a member of the Kiwanis Club, a member of the Zoning Appeals Board, and a Presbyterian.

He died of a seizure 16 March 1950.

He endowed two academic scholarships at the University of Alberta, one in his own name for science students and one in his wife's name for arts students.
