= David Milwyn Duggan =

Canadian politician

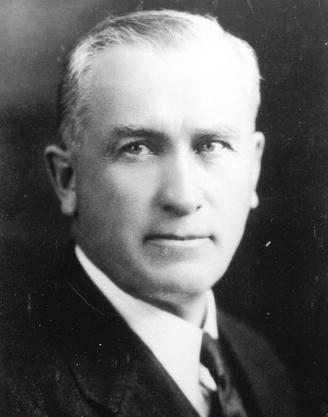

Leader of the Conservative Party of Alberta
- In office 1930 – May 4, 1942
- Preceded by: Alexander McGillivray
- Succeeded by: John Percy Page (after several years of dormancy)

Member of the Legislative Assembly of Alberta for Edmonton
- In office June 28, 1926 – May 4, 1942

16th Mayor of Edmonton
- In office December 13, 1920 – December 10, 1923
- Preceded by: Joseph Clarke
- Succeeded by: Kenny Blatchford

Personal details
- Born: May 5, 1879 Builth, Wales
- Died: May 4, 1942 (aged 62) Edmonton, Alberta, Canada
- Party: Conservative Party of Alberta, Citizens Progressive League, Citizens League
- Spouse: Marian Price
- Children: Four
- Profession: Businessman, farmer

David Milwyn Duggan (May 5, 1879 – May 4, 1942) was a Welsh-born Canadian politician who was the Mayor of Edmonton from 1920 to 1923, a member of the Legislative Assembly of Alberta, and a leader of the Conservative Party of Alberta.

== Early life ==
David Duggan was born in Builth, Wales May 5, 1879. In 1893 he entered the dry goods business, in which he remained until leaving Wales. In 1902 he married Marian Price, and went on to have four children with her.

Duggan immigrated to Canada in 1905 to farm near Nanton, Alberta. He and his brother Joseph J. moved to Edmonton in 1912 and founded Duggan Investments, Ltd., a firm handling bonds and investments. (Joseph served as Edmonton city councillor 1924 to 1925.)

== Municipal politics ==
Duggan ran for mayor in the 1920 Edmonton election. Despite lacking any previous political experience, he defeated incumbent Joseph Clarke. Clarke was unpopular with the city's Board of Trade and its two largest newspapers owing to what they perceived as anti-business policies. They supported Duggan.

During Duggan's mayoralty, Alberta's first radio station, CJCA, began operations, and Duggan himself concluded its inaugural broadcast by boasting "Edmonton leads the way in all Alberta. Calgary and others follow. That is all. Goodnight."

He was re-elected in 1921 and 1922, but did not seek re-election in 1923.

== Provincial politics ==
His attention turned to provincial politics, and he was elected to the Legislative Assembly of Alberta in the 1926 election as a Conservative in the riding of Edmonton. Duggan succeeded Alexander McGillivray as leader in 1930, and led the party into that year's election. In this election, the Conservatives picked up a seat in Edmonton (taking three of the city's six seats), but were shut out of seats outside of Edmonton and Calgary, as they had been in 1926. Moreover, they lost ground to the rival Alberta Liberal Party in the race to form the official opposition to the governing United Farmers of Alberta. Duggan easily retained his own seat.

The situation worsened for the Conservatives in the 1935 election, when the Social Credit Party of Alberta swept the province, reducing the Conservatives to two members, Duggan and Calgary MLA John Irwin (the other parties fared no better—the Liberals lost six of the eleven seats they had won in 1930, while the UFA, owners of a majority government before the writ was dropped, were eliminated from the legislature completely). In response to this electoral wipeout, Duggan's Conservatives formed an alliance with the Liberals, the Unity League, whereby candidates of the parties would not run against each other, these were identified as Independents on election results as the Unity League did not have official party status. In the 1940 election, there were nineteen independents elected, including Duggan.

During his last full term in the legislature, Duggan was involved in the Bankers' Toadies incident. He brought to the house's attention a government-sponsored leaflet that named him and eight other men (William Antrobus Griesbach among them) as "Banker's Toadies" and urged readers to "exterminate them". This incident saw Social Credit MLA Joseph Unwin and government advisor George F. Powell prosecuted for criminal libel and counselling murder.

== Personal life, death, and legacy ==
Duggan was active with the Baptist Church, the Rotary Club, the Edmonton Chamber of Commerce, and the Red Cross. He died on May 4, 1942, while still an MLA. He was buried in Mt. Pleasant Cemetery in Edmonton.

In 2004, Edmonton City Council passed a motion directing its Names Advisory Committee to strike a subcommittee whose purpose would be, among other things, to honour Duggan by naming a city feature after him.

Political offices
Preceded by Joseph Clarke	Mayor of Edmonton; 1921–1923	Succeeded by Kenneth Alexander Blatchford
Legislative Assembly of Alberta
Preceded by Andrew McLennan; John C. Bowen; Nellie McClung; Jeremiah Heffernan; William Thomas Henry	MLA Edmonton; 1926–1942	Succeeded by Elmer Ernest Roper
