= James Collisson =

Canadian politician (1875–1962)

James Thomas Joseph Collisson
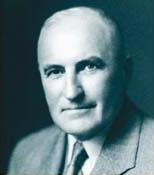

Alderman on the Edmonton City Council
- In office December 13, 1920 – December 13, 1926
- In office December 10, 1928 – November 9, 1932

Personal details
- Born: August 21, 1875 Lucan, Ontario
- Died: July 30, 1962 (aged 86)
- Party: Citizens' Progressive League, Citizens' League, Citizens Committee, Civic Governance Association
- Other political affiliations: Alberta Liberal Party
- Spouse: Irene
- Profession: Lawyer

James Thomas Joseph Collisson (August 21, 1875 – July 30, 1962) was a politician in Alberta, Canada, a long-time municipal councillor in Edmonton, and a candidate for election to the Legislative Assembly of Alberta.

== Early life ==
Collisson was born in Lucan, Ontario in 1875. He was educated there and in London, Ontario, and moved to Edmonton to teach in 1898. He remained there until 1903, when he moved to Dawson, Yukon. He taught there for two years, and returned to Edmonton in 1905. He joined the law form Short, Cross and Bigger (of which former and future mayor William Short was a partner) as a student at law. He was admitted to the Law Society of Alberta in 1908.

He served on Edmonton's public school board from 1908 until 1913.

== Municipal politics ==
Collisson first sought municipal office in the 1916 municipal election, when he ran for alderman on Edmonton City Council. He finished eighth of eleven, which wasn't high enough to be elected (only the top six candidates were elected in that election). He was more successful in 1920, when he finished fourth of sixteen candidates and was elected to a two-year term. He was re-elected in 1922 (when he finished fifth of sixteen candidates) and 1924 (when he finished second of eleven). He cut short his third term in order to run for mayor in the 1925 election, but finished second in a six candidate race as incumbent Kenny Blatchford took more than fifty-five percent of the vote.

He returned to politics in the 1928 election, when he returned to his old position on the strength of a sixth-place finish in a fourteen candidate field. He was re-elected in the 1930 election, when he finished third of nine candidates, but left municipal politics for good at the conclusion of this term.

On council, he chaired the finance committee.

== Provincial politics ==
Collisson ran for the Legislative Assembly of Alberta as a Liberal candidate in the 1930 provincial election. He finished eighth of seventeen candidates in the riding of Edmonton, and was eliminated on subsequent counts (the riding used a single transferable vote voting system at the time).

== Personal life, death, and legacy ==
After leaving politics, Collisson served as the president of Edmonton's community chest from 1941 until 1948.

James Collisson died July 30, 1962. He was survived by his wife, Irene, one son and two daughters, and eight grandchildren.
