= Thomas Malone (politician) =

Canadian politician (1875–1926)

Thomas P. Malone
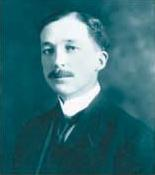

Alderman on the Edmonton City Council
- In office December 12, 1921 – December 10, 1923

Personal details
- Born: September 2, 1875 Ontario
- Died: December 10, 1926 (aged 51) Vancouver, British Columbia
- Party: Citizens Committee
- Profession: Merchant

Thomas Patrick Malone (September 2, 1875 – December 10, 1926) was a politician in Alberta, Canada. He served as an alderman on the Edmonton Town Council from 1921 until 1923. He committed suicide December 10, 1926.

== Early life ==
Malone was born in Ontario and came west to Alberta in 1901. He owned a store in Cochrane before moving to Edmonton in 1905. There, he bought a mercantile business on Whyte Avenue and later purchased the entire block. There he built Malone Limited, which became one of the city's leading department stores, and which Malone owned and operated until 1926. He also served as president of the South Side Community League and of the Federation of Community Leagues, and was involved with the Liberal Party.

== Politics ==
Malone first ran for office in the February 1912 municipal election, when, due to the recent amalgamation of Edmonton and Strathcona, an entire new Edmonton City Council was being elected (usually only half of the council was elected each year, to staggered two year terms). Malone finished fifteenth out of eighteen candidates in the aldermanic race and was defeated.

Thereafter, he stayed out of politics until the 1919 election, when he was acclaimed to the city's separate (Roman Catholic) school board. He did not seek election at the conclusion of his term, the 1921 election, preferring to run again for city council. Between his last run and this one, party politics had come to Edmonton municipal politics, and Malone aligned himself with the Citizens Committee, which had nearly swept the last election. He finished third of nineteen candidates and was elected to a two-year term. He completed it, but did not seek re-election at its conclusion.

== Later life and death ==
In February, 1926, Malone was taken ill. He sold his store and went to Rochester, Minnesota for medical treatment. Later that year he suffered a mental breakdown. He died in Vancouver's St. Paul's Hospital on December 10 of a self-inflicted gunshot wound from a .22 calibre revolver. He was survived by his wife, two sons, and two daughters.
