= Herbert Baker (politician) =

Canadian politician (1866–1941)

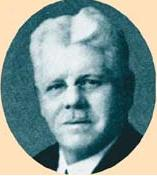

Alderman on the Edmonton City Council
- In office December 13, 1926 – December 10, 1928
- In office December 9, 1929 – November 8, 1933

Personal details
- Born: December 18, 1866 Kingston upon Hull, Yorkshire, England
- Died: December 21, 1941 (aged 75)
- Party: Civic Government Association
- Spouse: Grace T. Willis
- Children: Two sons, one daughter
- Profession: Businessman

Herbert Baker (December 18, 1866 – December 21, 1941) was a politician in Alberta, Canada and a municipal councillor in Edmonton.

== Early life ==
Herbert Baker was born at Hull, Yorkshire, England. In 1882, after being educated as public school, he emigrated to Canada, where he joined the Massey Manufacturing Co. in Toronto. There, he married Grace T. Willis on June 3, 1889; the couple had two sons and a daughter. He was promoted to manage the company's office in Winnipeg in 1904, and was promoted again in 1910 to manage all of the company's activities in northern Alberta. During this time, he was based in Edmonton, where he retired in 1926.

== Political career ==
Baker first sought election in the 1926 municipal election, when he ran for alderman on Edmonton City Council as a member of the pro-business Civic Government Association slate. He finished fourth of twelve candidates - first among the C.G.A.'s six candidates - and was elected to a two-year term. He sought re-election at the conclusion of this term, in the 1928 election, but finished eighth of fourteen candidates and was defeated.

He returned to office the following year, winning another two-year term after finishing third of fifteen candidates in the 1929 election. This time, he was successful in his re-election bid, as he finished fourth of fifteen candidates in the 1931 election. He did not seek re-election at the conclusion of this two-year term.

In 1933 as acting mayor, he had authorized construction of a roadway along the river under Ada Boulevard. This project was objectionable to many local residents, and he never sat on council again.
