= James East =

Canadian politician

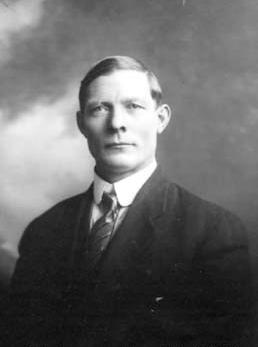

Alderman on the Edmonton City Council
- In office February 16, 1912 – October 27, 1914
- In office January 1, 1920 – December 9, 1929
- In office November 9, 1932 – November 12, 1936

Personal details
- Born: October 7, 1871 Bolton, Ontario
- Died: June 23, 1940 (aged 68)
- Party: Labour
- Other political affiliations: United People's League, Labour-Farmer
- Profession: Prospector

James East (October 7, 1871 – June 23, 1940) was a politician and labour activist in Alberta, Canada. He was for a time and the longest-serving alderman in Edmonton's history, and was an unsuccessful candidate at the provincial and federal levels. He was also an ardent monetary reformer.

== Early life ==
East was born in Bolton, Ontario on October 7, 1871. At the age of thirteen, he began to work in sawmills and farms. He took up prospecting and travelled the English-speaking world at it, going from South Dakota (in the Black Hills region) to New Mexico and Colorado, and then spending time in New Zealand and Australia. He returned to Canada in 1906, moving to Edmonton in 1907. He continued prospecting, moving to the Yukon for a time in 1911 before returning to Edmonton, more or less for good.

== Municipal politics and expulsion from office ==
James East first sought political office in the February 1912 municipal election, when he ran for alderman on the Edmonton City Council, finishing fifth of eighteen candidates. Unlike most of Edmonton's elections at the time, in which half of the aldermen were elected to two year terms (with the other half being elected to two year terms in intervening years) the recent amalgamation of Edmonton and Strathcona meant that all ten aldermen would be elected, five to two year terms and five to serve until the next election held late that same year. As a finisher in the top five, East would normally have been entitled to a two-year term; however the terms of the amalgamation specified that two of the aldermen elected to two year terms had to come from the south side of the North Saskatchewan River - where Strathcona was located - and there was only one such candidate (John Tipton) in the top five. Accordingly, Thomas J. Walsh - the second-place southside candidate, who had come in eighth - was elected to a two-year term, and East just for 1912.

He was easily re-elected to a two-year term in the next election held in December. However, during this two-year term, Justice William Ives convicted East of voting on a matter in which he had a pecuniary interest, and he was expelled from office on October 27, 1914 (mayor William McNamara was expelled at the same time for the same reason). East attempted to return to office in the 1914 election, but came in tenth out of fourteen candidates and was not elected.

== World War I, return to municipal office, and federal politics ==
In 1916, East enlisted in the Canadian Expeditionary Force, where he spent the rest of the First World War on the hospital ships Araguaya and Letitia before leaving the military in 1919.

Upon his return to civilian life, East returned immediately to politics, running in the 1919 municipal election. In the years intervening since his last election, party politics had arrived at the municipal level in Edmonton, and East aligned himself with the Labour slate. This was a good election for Labour; its mayoral candidate, Joseph Clarke, was re-elected; it took the top three spots in the aldermanic race (East finished second). Overall it held five seats on the 11-member city council.

East served on city council for the next ten years.

The 1921 election when East ran for re-election was less kind to Labour than the 1919 election had been. East, finishing second, was the only one of its candidates elected to city council.

He was re-elected in the next three elections as well. He finished first in 1923, second in 1925, and third in 1927 and was elected all three times - Edmonton was electing four or more at a time in those days. At this time, Edmonton was using Single transferable voting in city elections. The fairness of the PR system likely aided East's re-election.

While serving as alderman, East contested the 1925 federal election as a Labour-Farmer candidate (aligned with J.S. Woodsworth) in Edmonton West, where he finished last of three candidates, behind Liberal Charles Stewart and Conservative James McCrie Douglas.

== Out of office, resurgence, and final defeat ==
In the 1929 municipal election, rather than running for re-election as alderman, East challenged his former federal rival James Douglas for the mayoralty. He was defeated handily, finishing second in a four-person race. He tried to return to aldermanic office in 1930 but finished sixth out of twelve candidates, missing the five available seats. Labour's rival, the Civic Government Association party, swept all seats but one (won by Labour's Lionel Gibbs).

East sat out the 1931 election, but made a successful run for alderman in 1932, when he finished fourth. In the 1934 election, there were six seats available due to Rice Sheppard's resignation to run for mayor halfway through his term, and East finished sixth to become Labour's only elected alderman that election. He received only three votes more than James Ponton, the CGA's lowest-ranking candidate.

In 1935, municipal politics in Edmonton began to re-align. Labour continued to run candidates, but for the first time they were up against Social Credit candidates, many of whom had links to the political left and to Labour. Labour candidate Margaret Crang and three SC candidates were elected in this election (source: Monto, Tom. Protest and Progress. Three Labour Radicals in Early Edmonton (Rice Sheppard, Harry Ainlay and Margaret Crang). Edmonton : Crang Publishing/Alhambra Books, 2011).

Among these successful Social Credit candidates was East's brother Elisha, who was elected in the 1935 election - making the pair the only brothers to serve on the Edmonton City Council at the same time.

For his 1936 re-election attempt, East joined the newly formed United People's League. This proved a mistake;. He finished first among the UPL candidates, but fell far short of re-election, finishing eleventh in an election swept by the CGA-successor Citizens' Committee.

James East, by then in his sixties, made no further attempt to return to elected office.

== Death ==
James East died June 23, 1940, at the age of 68. He was survived by his wife and one son.
