= S. A. G. Barnes =

Canadian politician (1875–1941)

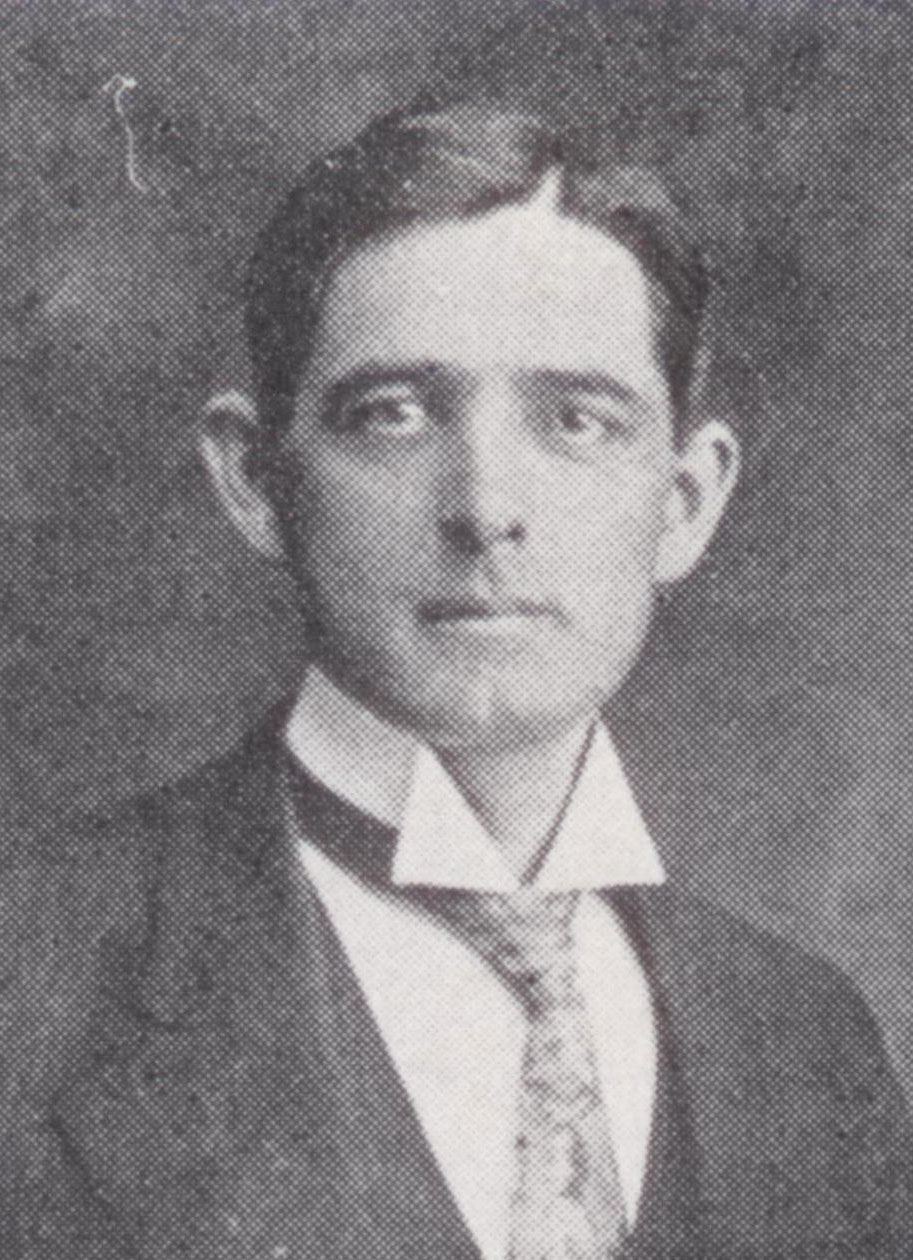

Edmonton Public School Trustee
- In office December 12, 1910 – December 10, 1917
- In office December 8, 1919 – December 14, 1925
- In office December 13, 1926 – November 12, 1936

Member of the Legislative Assembly of Alberta
- In office August 22, 1935 – March 21, 1940 Serving with David Duggan (1935–1940), Edward Gray (1937–1940), William Howson (1935–1936), Walter Morrish (1936–1940), David Mullen (1935-1940), Gerald O'Connor (1935–1940) and George Van Allen (1935–1937)
- Preceded by: William Atkinson, Charles Gibbs, Frederick Jamieson and John Lymburn
- Succeeded by: Norman James, Hugh John Macdonald, Ernest Manning, John Page
- Constituency: Edmonton

Personal details
- Born: Samuel Augustus Gordon Barnes; August 10, 1875 Warwick, Ontario
- Died: April 14, 1941 (aged 65) Edmonton, Alberta
- Party: Social Credit
- Other political affiliations: Independent Progressive
- Spouse: Florence Shaver
- Occupation: teacher, insurance salesman and politician

Samuel Augustus Gordon Barnes (August 10, 1875 – April 14, 1941) was a Canadian teacher, insurance salesman and politician from Alberta. He held public office on both the municipal and provincial levels of government in the province. He served for decades as an Edmonton Public School trustee, his first stint was from 1910 to 1917 and then from 1919 to 1925 and a third stint from 1926 to 1936. He also served as a member of the Legislative Assembly of Alberta from 1935 to 1940 sitting with the Social Credit caucus in government and later as an Independent in opposition.

== Early life ==
Samuel Augustus Gordon Barnes was born in 1875 in Warwick, Ontario. He grew up in the community taking his early schooling there. He moved to Toronto for his post secondary education taking it at Strathroy Collegiate Institute, Toronto Normal School and Toronto School of Pedagogy.

Barnes moved west after completing his education. He settled in the Northwest Territories at Melfort in 1897 and began a career as a school teacher. He lived in the town for five years before moving east to attend the University of Manitoba for a degree in mathematics. He moved back west settling in Edmonton in 1905. Shortly after arriving he founded an insurance business, that he ran until his death in 1941.

== Political career ==
=== Edmonton municipal politics ===
Barnes began his political career by running for a seat as a trustee on the Edmonton Public School Board in the 1910 municipal election. He finished in third place of six candidates, earning the final seat of the four filled in this contest and beginning his first two-year term in office.

Due to a merger between the city of Strathcona and the city of Edmonton, an early municipal election was held. Barnes stood for his second term in the February 1912 municipal election. All seven seats on the school board were filled in this contest, with Barnes placing third in popularity to take another 2-year term (to extend past the December 1912 election to December 1913).

Barnes stood for re-election to his third term in the 1913 municipal election. He slipped to fourth place in popularity but was still re-elected for another two years, as five were elected at this time.

Barnes stood for his fourth consecutive term in the 1915 municipal election. He was easily re-elected winning the second place seat, and coming just shy of heading the polls in the four-seat contest.

After spending four terms on the School Board, Barnes ran for mayor in the 1917 municipal election. His popularity did not translate to the mayoral seat. He finished third in a five candidate field that was won by H.M.E. Evans.

With the advent of partisan politics at the municipal level in Edmonton, Barnes associated himself with the Labor Party. He ran for another term as Public School trustee under the Labour Party banner in the 1919 municipal election. Barnes easily won a seat, finishing just 13 votes from first place in the four-winner contest.

Barnes served as president of the Edmonton branch of the Labor Party in 1921. He stood for re-election to the public school board in the general election held that year and won easily, heading the polls over the field of eight candidates.

Barnes stood for a seventh term in the 1923 municipal election. For the second time he was elected, heading the polls by a significant margin over the six other candidates in the four-winner contest. At the end of his seventh term in 1925 he did not seek re-election and missed out of council for a year.

Barnes secured another term as a Public School trustee by running in the 1926 municipal election. His popularity carried over despite missing a year, and he was re-elected, again finishing first.

Barnes ran for a ninth term in the 1928 municipal election. He finished first for the fourth time in a row, winning his largest popular vote to date.

Barnes ran for a tenth term on the public school board in the 1930 municipal election, exactly 20 years after first being elected to the position. His popularity slipped, but he won re-election by taking a two-year-term seat.

Barnes stood for his eleventh term in office in the 1932 municipal election. He kept his seat by placing third in the field of seven candidates in the three-winner contest.

Barnes ran for his twelfth and final term as a trustee in the 1934 municipal election. He was re-elected and won the largest popular vote of his career.

A year into his 1935-1936 term on the school board, he ran for a seat in the Alberta Legislature and won. He held both seats until his trustee term expired in late 1936.

While still holding his seat in the Legislature, although having been "read out" of the Social Credit caucus, Barnes in 1939 ran to be mayor of Edmonton. He lost in a landslide to John Wesley Fry in a two-way race, Barnes taking only 19 percent of the votes cast.

=== Provincial politics ===
Barnes ran for a seat to the Alberta Legislature under the Social Credit banner in the 1935 Alberta general election. He won the second seat in the five-seat Edmonton electoral district.

Barnes was expelled from the Social Credit caucus after the 1937 Social Credit backbenchers' revolt. He sat the rest of his term on the opposition benches as an Independent. In 1939 he joined, and became leader of, the Independent Progressives, which included MLAs Charles Cockroft and William Chant.

Barnes ran for a second term in the 1940 provincial election, under the Independent Progressive label. He was unsuccessful, placing eighteenth out of nineteen candidates in the first round of counting. The election used single transferable voting, but Barnes did not last long enough to receive votes transfers to improve his vote tally.

== Late life ==
Barnes in his later years became managing director of Savings Bonds of Canada. He had also joined the Native Sons of Canada club.

After the demise of his political career with his unsuccessful run for mayor and his defeat from the Legislature, Barnes continued on with his insurance practice for a short time.

He died on April 14, 1941 at his desk in his office, only a year after being defeated from public office.
