= Lionel Gibbs =

Canadian politician (1877–1934)

Charles Lionel Gibbs
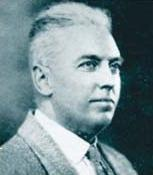

Member of the Legislative Assembly of Alberta for Edmonton
- In office June 28, 1926 – September 5, 1934

Alderman on the Edmonton City Council
- In office December 8, 1924 – September 5, 1934

Personal details
- Born: November 11, 1877 Newport, Monmouthshire, Wales
- Died: September 5, 1934 (aged 56) Sault Ste. Marie, Ontario
- Party: Dominion Labor Party
- Children: One son, one daughter
- Profession: Architect

Charles Lionel Gibbs (November 11, 1877 – September 5, 1934) was a Canadian politician based in Alberta. He served as a municipal councillor in Edmonton from 1924 until his death and, concurrently, a member of the Legislative Assembly of Alberta from 1926 until his death.

== Early life ==
Gibbs was born November 11, 1877, in Newport, Monmouthshire, Wales and was educated at Surrey and Oxford, training as an architect. He emigrated to Canada in 1907, and established an architecture firm in Edmonton, Barnes and Gibbs, that same year. He also taught at the Edmonton Technical High School, and chaired the city's Parks Commission in 1912.

== Politics ==
=== Edmonton municipal politics ===
Gibbs first sought elected office in the 1910 election, when he ran for alderman on the Edmonton City Council. He finished ninth of eleven candidates, and was not elected (the top five were). He sought election again in 1914, when he was elected as a school trustee. He served a two-year term in this position, but did not seek re-election at its conclusion.

In the 1924 election, Gibbs was elected as an alderman running on the Labour slate, finishing fourth of eleven candidates. He finished first of twelve candidates in his 1926 re-election attempt, and was similarly re-elected in the 1928 (first of fourteen candidates), 1930 (second of twelve), and 1932 (first of fifteen) re-election attempts. While on city council, he participated in Labour's de facto majority on council. (While Labour only had five aldermen - Gibbs, L.S.C. Dineen, James East, Alfred Farmilo, and James Findlay, a sixth, Rice Sheppard had been elected as an independent labour candidate and was sympathetic to Labour's views).

Lionel was still in office at the time of his death.

=== Provincial politics ===
Gibbs sought provincial office as a member of the Labour Party in the riding of Edmonton during the 1926 provincial election. At the time, the riding had five seats, elected using a single transferable vote electoral system. On the first count, he finished ninth of eighteen candidates. However, on subsequent counts the redistribution of votes from defeated and elected candidates made him the third of five MLAs elected.

He was re-elected in the 1930 election. The Edmonton district was electing six in that election. He came in third of seventeen candidates on the first count. After vote transfers his vote total was more than enough to be elected.

He was still an MLA at the time of his death in 1934.

== Death ==
Charles Gibbs died September 5, 1934, in Sault Ste. Marie, Ontario, while on a tour of eastern Canada.
