= 1944 Edmonton municipal election =

Municipal election in Alberta, Canada

The 1944 municipal election was held November 1, 1944 to elect a mayor and five aldermen to sit on Edmonton City Council and three trustees to sit on the public school board, while three trustees were acclaimed to the separate school board. This was the first election to be held on the first Wednesday of November rather than the second Wednesday, in order to avoid future conflicts with the Armistice Day holiday, as happened in 1936 and 1942.

There were ten aldermen on city council, but five of the positions were already filled: James McCrie Douglas (SS), Harry Ainlay (SS), Winslow Hamilton, Charles Gariepy, and Melvin Downey (SS) were all elected to two-year terms in 1943 and were still in office. Southside (SS) representation was guaranteed - two councillors had to come from the southside. This requirement was dropped in 1961.

There were seven trustees on the public school board, but four of the positions were already filled: Albert Ottewell (SS), Bertram Robertson, Frank Newson, and Roy Sutherland had been elected to two-year terms in 1943 and were still in office. The same was true of the separate board, where William Wilde (SS), Joseph Gallant, Thomas Malone, and J O Pilon were continuing.

== Voter turnout ==
There were 9,948 ballots cast out of 61,033 eligible voters, for a voter turnout of 16.4%.

== Results ==
- bold or ✓ indicates elected
- italics indicate incumbent
- "SS", where data is available, indicates representative for Edmonton's South Side, with a minimum South Side representation instituted after the city of Strathcona, south of the North Saskatchewan River, amalgamated into Edmonton on February 1, 1912.

=== Mayor ===
Party	Candidate	Votes	%
Independent	John Wesley Fry	7,017	71.12%
Independent	Rice Sheppard	2,850	28.88%

=== Aldermen ===
Party	Candidate	Votes		Elected
Citizens' Committee	Sidney Bowcott	6,597		✓
Citizens' Committee	Athelstan Bissett	6,317	SS	✓
Citizens' Committee	Sidney Parsons	6,094		✓
Citizens' Committee	James Ogilvie	5,916		✓
Citizens' Committee	Frederick John Mitchell	5,532		✓
Independent	Gwendolen Clarke	3,420		
Co-operative Commonwealth Federation	Margaret Thompson	2,311		
Co-operative Commonwealth Federation	Edith Rogers	2,298		
Co-operative Commonwealth Federation	Alfred Gregory	2,273		
Co-operative Commonwealth Federation	Howard Smith	2,015		
Co-operative Commonwealth Federation	Robert Haskins	1,944		
Independent	Jan Lakeman	1,585		

=== Public school trustees ===
Party	Candidate	Votes		Elected
Citizens' Committee	Izena Ross	5,593		✓
Citizens' Committee	George Cormie	5,255		✓
Citizens' Committee	Alex Gemeroy	5,143		✓
Co-operative Commonwealth Federation	Mary Butterworth	3,371	SS	
Co-operative Commonwealth Federation	William Thornton	2,994		
Co-operative Commonwealth Federation	Archibald Richardson	2,888		

=== Separate (Catholic) school trustees ===
Adrian Crowe (SS), Francis Killeen, and James O'Hara were acclaimed.
