= 1938 Edmonton municipal election =

Municipal election in Alberta, Canada

The 1938 municipal election was held November 9, 1938 to elect a mayor and five aldermen to sit on Edmonton City Council and three trustees to sit on the public school board, while three trustees were acclaimed to the separate school board. Voters also rejected two proposals to borrow money from other levels of government for the construction of new housing.

There were ten aldermen on city council, but five of the positions were already filled: Edward Brown, Frederick Casselman, Douglas Grout (SS), George Campbell, and Dan Knott were all elected to two-year terms in 1937 and were still in office.

There were seven trustees on the public school board, but four of the positions were already filled: Albert Ottewell (SS), Walter Morrish, Sidney Bowcott, and Bruce Smith had been elected to two-year terms in 1937 and were still in office. The same was true on the separate school board, where Hugh Currie, Charles Gariepy, William Wilde (SS), and John Whelihan were continuing.

== Voter turnout ==
There were 23,599 ballots cast out of 53,848 eligible voters, for a voter turnout of 43.8%.

== Results ==
- bold or ✓ indicates elected
- italics indicate incumbent
- "SS", where data is available, indicates representative for Edmonton's South Side, with a minimum South Side representation instituted after the city of Strathcona, south of the North Saskatchewan River, amalgamated into Edmonton on February 1, 1912.

=== Mayor ===
Party	Candidate	Votes	%
Citizens' Committee	John Wesley Fry	12,491	53.34%
Independent	Joseph Clarke	5,922	25.29%
Canadian Labour Party/ Co-operative Commonwealth Federation	Charles Gould	4,807	20.53%
Independent	Frederick Speed	198	0.85%

=== Aldermen ===
Party	Candidate	Votes		Elected
Citizens' Committee	Hugh Macdonald	13,424		✓
Citizens' Committee	Mack McColl	10,695		✓
Citizens' Committee	James Ogilvie	11,893		✓
Citizens' Committee	Sidney Parsons	11,354		✓
Citizens' Committee	Blair Paterson	11,231	SS	✓
Canadian Labour Party/ Co-operative Commonwealth Federation	Harry Ainlay	9,876	SS	
Progressive	Margaret Crang	8,664	SS	
Canadian Labour Party/ Co-operative Commonwealth Federation	James Findlay	8,561		
Canadian Labour Party/ Co-operative Commonwealth Federation	William Miller	6,387		
Progressive	Elisha East	6,000		
Independent	Sidney Bowcott	5,083		
Independent	M. M. Downey	2,619	SS	
Independent	Raymond C. Ghostley	2,065		

The civic Progressive party, with candidates for alderman and public school trustee, represented a "united front" of the Communist Party, the Social Credit movement and other leftist reformers.

=== Public school trustees ===
Party	Candidate	Votes		Elected
Citizens' Committee	Izena Ross	11,716		✓
Citizens' Committee	Armour Ford	11,189		✓
Citizens' Committee	W. G. McConachie	10,520		✓
Progressive	Frank Crang	8,171	SS	
Canadian Labour Party/ Co-operative Commonwealth Federation	W. H. Thornton	6,264		
Progressive	Mary Ann Gilchrist	5,141		
Canadian Labour Party/ Co-operative Commonwealth Federation	A. Richardson	3,559		

=== Separate (Catholic) school trustees ===
Adrien Crowe (SS), James O'Hara, and J O Pilon were acclaimed.

=== Plebiscites ===
==== Low Income Housing ====
Are you in favour of the city borrowing from the Dominion or Provincial governments, to construct low cost dwelling houses in Edmonton, for rental purposes only, a sum not exceeding $250,000, repayable in from 20 to 35 years, with interest not exceeding two per cent per annum?

- Yes - 2,687
- No - 3,593

==== Regular Housing ====
Are you in favour of the city borrowing from the Dominion or Provincial governments, for the purpose of loaning to individuals to construct dwelling houses in Edmonton, a sum not exceeding $250,000, repayable in from 20 to 35 years at a rate of interest not exceeding five percent per annum?

- Yes - 2,430
- No - 3,578
