= 1933 Edmonton municipal election =

Municipal election in Alberta, Canada

The 1933 Edmonton municipal election was held November 8, 1933 to elect a mayor and five aldermen to sit on City Council and four trustees each to sit on the public and separate school boards.

There were ten aldermen on city council, but five of the positions were already filled. James East, Charles Gibbs, John Wesley Fry, John McCreath and James Ogilvie had been elected to two-year terms in 1932 and were still in office.

There were seven trustees on the public school board, but three of the positions were already filled. Samuel Barnes, Frederick Casselman and Mrs. E G Ferris had been elected to two-year terms in 1932 and were still in office. The same was true of the separate school board, where Adrien Crowe (SS), J O Pilon, and W D Trainor were continuing.

== Voter turnout ==
In this election, 21,730 of 44,603 eligible voters cast votes, for a voter turnout of 48.7%.

== Results ==
- bold or ✓ indicates elected
- italics indicate incumbent
- South Side, where data is available, indicates representative for Edmonton's South Side, with a minimum South Side representation instituted after the city of Strathcona, south of the North Saskatchewan River, amalgamated into Edmonton on February 1, 1912.

=== Mayor ===
Party	Candidate	Votes	%
Labour	Daniel Kennedy Knott	13,453	61.91%
Independent Labour	Joseph Clarke	7,657	35.24%
Independent	J. A. Leonard	620	2.85%

=== Aldermen ===
Councillors were elected through Plurality block voting in a city-wide district.

The Labour Party took four of the five seats up for election.

Margaret Crang was among them. She was the second woman elected to the Edmonton city council.

Party	Candidate	Votes		Elected
Labour Party	Rice Sheppard	11,418	SS	✓
Labour Party	Miss M. (Margaret) Crang	10,858	SS	✓
Labour Party	Harry Ainlay	10,195	SS	✓
Civic Government Association	Ralph Bellamy	9,609		✓
Labour Party	James Findlay	9,536		✓
Civic Government Association	W. W. McBain	8,471		
Civic Government Association	Robert Dolphin Tighe	7,728		
Civic Government Association	T. A. Graham	7,647		
Civic Government Association	Dick Foote	7,537		
Independent Labour Party	M. Ainslie	2,879		
Communist Party	Jan Lakeman	2,830		
Independent Labour Party	Frank R. Lovette	2,636		
Independent Labour Party	Walter Clevely	2,493		
Communist Party	George H. Salter	1,295		
Independent	Peter Glassman	1,215		
Independent	F. S. Wright	1,094		
Independent	Charles Martin Keily	681		

=== Public school trustees ===
Party	Candidate	Votes		Elected
Civic Government Association	Albert Ottewell	12,500	SS	✓
Labour	Frank Crang	11,963	SS	✓
Civic Government Association	Walter Morrish	9,722		✓
Labour	Sidney Bowcott	9,309		✓
Civic Government Association	H. H. Dyde	8,762		
Civic Government Association	Ernest Howard	7,909		
Labour	L. E. Price	6,911		

=== Separate (Catholic) school trustees ===
Party	Candidate	Votes		Elected
Independent	Charles Gariepy	1,830		✓
Independent	Thomas Malone	1,812		✓
Independent	Thomas Magee	1,688		✓
Independent	Mrs. M. Conroy	1,683		
Independent	J. Tansey	1,444	SS	✓

Under the minimum South Side representation rule, Tansey was elected over Conroy.

=== Board of Health Plebiscite ===
Are you in favor of the health services at present administered by the local Board of Health of the City of Edmonton and the Public and Separate School Boards being amalgamated and placed under the control of the local Board of Health?

- Yes - 11,660
- No - 7,971
