= 1931 Edmonton municipal election =

Municipal election in Alberta, Canada

The 1931 municipal election was held November 11, 1931 to elect a mayor and five aldermen to sit on Edmonton City Council and four trustees to sit on the public school board, while four trustees were acclaimed to the separate school board.

There were ten aldermen on city council, but five of the positions were already filled: James Collisson, Charles Gibbs, Frederick Keillor (SS), Donald Lake, and Charles Gerald O'Connor were all elected to two-year terms in 1930 and were still in office.

There were seven trustees on the public school board, but three of the positions were already filled: Samuel Barnes, Frederick Casselman, and Mrs. W D Ferris had all been elected to two-year terms in 1930 and were still in office. The same was true of the separate school board, where A J Crowe (SS), J O Pilon, and W D Trainor were continuing.

== Voter turnout ==
There were 22,583 ballots cast out of 42,753 eligible voters, for a voter turnout of 52.8%.

== Results ==
- bold or ✓ indicates elected
- italics indicate incumbent
- "SS", where data is available, indicates representative for Edmonton's South Side, with a minimum South Side representation instituted after the city of Strathcona, south of the North Saskatchewan River, amalgamated into Edmonton on February 1, 1912.

=== Mayor ===
Party	Candidate	Votes	%
Labour	Daniel Kennedy Knott	13,014	57.63%
Civic Government Association	James McCrie Douglas	9,569	42.37%

=== Aldermen ===
Party	Candidate	Votes		Elected
Labour	Rice Sheppard	11,519	SS	✓
Labour	Harry Ainlay	10,316	SS	✓
Labour	James Findlay	10,186		✓
Civic Government Association	Herbert Baker	9,839		✓
Civic Government Association	Arthur Gainer	9,741		✓
Civic Government Association	Ralph Bellamy	8,780		
Labour	Sidney Parsons	7,994		
Civic Government Association	Thornton Graham	7,802		
Independent	Dick Foote	7,514		
Independent	Joseph Clarke	4,944		
Independent	William Ross	3,888		
Independent	Lin S. Bell	3,222		
Independent	Frank R. Lovette	2,540		
Communist	Jan Lakeman	1,702		
Independent	Peter Glassman	1,197		

=== Public school trustees ===
Party	Candidate	Votes		Elected
Civic Government Association	Albert Ottewell	11,035	SS	✓
Labour	Frank Crang	10,919	SS	✓
Civic Government Association	L. Y. Cairns	9,222		✓
Civic Government Association	Arthur Cushing	9,009		
Labour	Sidney Bowcott	9,005		✓
Labour	Daniel Powers	8,970		
Civic Government Association	S. A. Dickson	8,327		

(The figures above were those from the initial count. Upon completion of a recount, Bowcott was found to have received more votes than Cushing and was therefore elected.)

=== Separate (Catholic) school trustees ===
Charles Gariepy, Thomas Magee, T Malone, and J Tansey (SS) were acclaimed.
