= 1934 Edmonton municipal election =

Municipal election in Alberta, Canada

The 1934 municipal election was held November 14, 1934 to elect a mayor and six aldermen to sit on Edmonton City Council and three trustees to sit on each of the public and separate school boards.

There were ten aldermen on city council, but four of the positions were already filled: Margaret Crang (SS), Harry Ainlay (SS), Ralph Bellamy, and James Findlay were all elected to two-year terms in 1933 and were still in office. Rice Sheppard (SS) was also elected to a two-year term in 1933, but had resigned in order to run for mayor; accordingly, Athelstan Bissett (SS) was elected to a one-year term.

There were seven trustees on the public school board, but four of the positions were already filled: Albert Ottewell (SS), Frank Crang (SS), Walter Morrish, and Sidney Bowcott had all been elected to two-year terms in 1933 and were still in office. The same was true of the separate school board, where Charles Gariepy, T Malone, Thomas Magee, and J Tansey (SS) were continuing.

== Voter turnout ==
There were 27,683 ballots cast out of 45,589 eligible voters, for a voter turnout of 60.7%.

== Results ==
- bold or ✓ indicates elected
- italics indicate incumbent
- "SS", where data is available, indicates representative for Edmonton's South Side, with a minimum South Side representation instituted after the city of Strathcona, south of the North Saskatchewan River, amalgamated into Edmonton on February 1, 1912.

=== Mayor ===
Party	Candidate	Votes	%
Independent Labour	Joseph Clarke	9,977	36.35%
Civic Government Association	James Harwood Ogilvie	9,575	34.89%
Labour	Daniel Kennedy Knott	5,996	21.85%
Independent	Rice Sheppard	1,849	6.74%
Independent	Frederick Speed	50	0.18%

=== Aldermen ===
Party	Candidate	Votes		Elected
Civic Government Association	Hugh MacDonald	14,116		✓
Civic Government Association	John Wesley Fry	13,554		✓
Civic Government Association	Dick Foote	12,436		✓
Civic Government Association	John McCreath	11,990		✓
Civic Government Association	Athelstan Bissett	11,576	SS	✓
Labour	James East	10,654		✓
Civic Government Association	James Ponton	10,651		
Labour	E. E. Hyde	9,127		
Labour	Sidney Parsons	8,102		
Labour	L. E. Price	6,991		
Labour	W. H. Miller	6,453		
Independent Labour	Walter Clevely	5,887		
Independent Labour	C. W. Lee	4,922		
Independent Labour	Charles Martin Keily	3,930		
Independent Labour	R. H. Le Maitre	3,883		
Independent Labour	E. C. Holub	3,410		
Independent	Peter Glassman	3,247		
Communist	George H. Salter	2,681		
Independent	J. A. Leonard	1,731		

=== Public school trustees ===
Party	Candidate	Votes	Elected
Civic Government Association	Frederick Casselman	13,543	✓
Labour	Samuel Barnes	12,681	✓
Civic Government Association	Izena Ross	12,230	✓
Civic Government Association	E. E. Howard	11,046	
Labour	H. H. Owen	7,758	
Independent	E. A. Roe	7,620	

=== Separate (Catholic) school trustees ===
Candidate	Votes		Elected
J O Pilon	2,109		✓
James O'Hara	1,886		✓
Adrien Crowe	1,814	SS	✓

Names and vote totals of defeated candidates are no longer available.
