= 1940 Edmonton municipal election =

Municipal election in Alberta, Canada

The 1940 municipal election was held November 13, 1940 to elect a mayor and seven aldermen to sit on Edmonton City Council. Elections for school trustees were not held, as candidates for both the public and separate boards were acclaimed.

There were ten aldermen on city council, but three of the positions were already filled: George Campbell (SS), Edward Brown, and Dan Knott were all elected to two-year terms in 1939 and were still in office. Frederick Casselman and Douglas Grout (SS) had also been elected to two-year terms in 1939, but had resigned; accordingly, Charles Gariepy and Blair Paterson (SS) were elected to one-year terms.

There were seven trustees on the public school board, but four of the positions were already filled: M Downey (SS), Bruce Smith, R L Sutherland, and Albert Ottewell (SS) had been elected to two-year terms in 1939 and were still in office. The same was true of the separate board, where Romeo Bouchard, Hugh Currie, Robert Tighe, and William Wilde (SS) were continuing.

== Voter turnout ==
There were 14,523 ballots cast out of 56,225 eligible voters, for a voter turnout of 25.8%.

== Results ==
- bold or ✓ indicates elected
- italics indicate incumbent
- "SS", where data is available, indicates representative for Edmonton's South Side, with a minimum South Side representation instituted after the city of Strathcona, south of the North Saskatchewan River, amalgamated into Edmonton on February 1, 1912.

=== Mayor ===
Party	Candidate	Votes	%
Citizens' Committee	John Wesley Fry	8,044	55.62%
Independent	Douglas Grout	5,281	36.51%
Independent	Lloyd Wood	1,138	7.87%

=== Aldermen ===
Party	Candidate	Votes		Elected
Citizens' Committee	James Ogilvie	8,790		✓
Citizens' Committee	Sidney Bowcott	8,553		✓
Citizens' Committee	Athelstan Bissett	8,294	SS	✓
Citizens' Committee	Sidney Parsons	7,896		✓
Citizens' Committee	Blair Paterson	7,571	SS	✓
Citizens' Committee	Frederick John Mitchell	7,152		✓
Citizens' Committee	Charles Gariepy	6,791		✓
Independent	Joseph Clarke	4,746		
Civic Progressive Association	Walter Clevely	4,044		
Civic Progressive Association	Rice Sheppard	4,040	SS	
Civic Progressive Association	Guy Patterson	4,025		
Civic Progressive Association	E. C. Fisher	3,790		
Civic Progressive Association	Elisha East	3,743		
Civic Progressive Association	C. B. Willis	3,303		
Civic Progressive Association	A. A. Deacon	2,384		
Labour Party	William Miller	2,366		
Labour Party	W. H. O'Neill	2,069		
Independent	Peter Glassman	1,287		
Democrat	Ernest C. Holub	660		

=== Public school trustees ===
Izena Ross, E M Gunderson, and W G McConachie were acclaimed.

=== Separate (Catholic) school trustees ===
Adrien Crowe (SS), James O’Hara, and J O Pilon were acclaimed.
