= Edmonton (provincial electoral district) =

Defunct provincial electoral district in Alberta, Canada

Coordinates: 53.55°N 113.49°W

Alberta electoral district

Defunct provincial electoral district
- Legislature: Legislative Assembly of Alberta
- District created: 1905
- District abolished: 1917
- District re-created: 1921
- District re-abolished: 1955
- First contested: 1905
- Last contested: 1959

The Edmonton provincial electoral district was a provincial electoral district in Alberta, Canada, mandated to return members to the Legislative Assembly of Alberta from 1905 to 1917 and from 1921 to 1959. It was known as Edmonton City from 1905 to 1909.

The electoral district was created when Alberta became a province, replacing the territorial electoral district of the same name. It covered the city of Edmonton. Its boundaries varied with changes in the city's corporate limits. It was in use from 1905 to 1917 and again from 1921 to 1959. In 1917 and since 1956, the city (small as it was in former times) was broken up into separate single-member constituencies bearing different names. During its time in use, it had varying numbers of seats, having only one in 1905, then two in 1909 and 1913, then 5 to 7 in the 1921-1959 period.

After Alberta became a province, the Edmonton provincial district was created in 1905 to encompass residents of the city of Edmonton, which at the time was located solely on the north side of the North Saskatchewan River. In 1917 it was broken up into two single-seat districts. The Edmonton district was created in 1921 to cover both sides of the river. By that time, the southside City of Strathcona and the northside City of Edmonton had merged into the City of Edmonton.

the Edmonton provincial constituency was represented by multiple members from 1909 to 1959, using either block voting or single transferable voting (STV). The only exception was the period 1917-1921, when the city-wide district was broken up into separate districts.

From 1905 to 1926, each Edmonton voter could cast as many votes as the number of seats in the district. In 1909 and 1913, Edmonton voters could cast up to two votes each. (In 1917, Edmonton was divided into three single-member districts, under the names Edmonton East, West and South (covering the former city of Strathcona); each voter could cast just one vote.) In 1921 a city-wide district was again created, and Edmonton voters could cast up to five votes, the same number as seats. From 1926 to 1959, with its district magnitude set at five, six or seven, Edmonton used STV in general elections, where each voter cast one transferable vote (ranked voting).

By-elections were decided using first-past-the-post voting, except those conducted from 1924 to 1955 when instant runoff voting was used.

== History ==
Three methods of electing representatives were used over the years in the Edmonton district.

First past the post election of a single member was used in 1905, 1917 and from 1959 to present (and in all by-elections up to 1924 and after 1956).

The Edmonton constituency was divided into two single-member constituencies for the provincial election of 1917: Edmonton East and Edmonton West. The adjacent constituency of Edmonton South had been renamed from the old constituency of Strathcona.

The three Edmonton districts were merged to form the Edmonton constituency in 1921, and block voting was established in 1921, to elect five members in the constituency. Block voting (voters able to cast as many votes as there were seats) was used in 1909 and 1913, each voter casting up to two votes, and up to five votes in 1921.

As a semblance of proportional representation, the UFA government brought in ranked voting for all constituencies starting in 1924. It maintained Edmonton, Calgary, and Medicine Hat as multi-member constituencies, with seats now filled through single transferable voting, which at the time was called the Hare system or simply proportional representation. Under STV, each voter cast just one vote but could also mark secondary preferences as backup contingency votes. Instant-runoff voting was used outside those multi-member districts and was also used in all provincial by-elections during this period.

Edmonton elected five members 1921–1930, then six members in 1930, 1935 and 1940, then five members in 1944 and 1948. The Edmonton district elected seven seats in 1952 and 1955.

In 1959 the Social Credit government broke up the Calgary and Edmonton constituencies and replaced single transferable voting with first-past-the-post in single-member districts. Nine constituencies were created in Edmonton: Edmonton Centre, Edmonton North, Edmonton Norwood, Edmonton North East, Edmonton North West, Jasper West, Strathcona Centre, Strathcona East, and Strathcona West.

The first woman elected to a provincial seat in Edmonton was Liberal Nellie McClung in 1921. The next woman was not elected in Edmonton until Mary Lemessurier in 1979. Other women candidates ran in Edmonton during that period, including during the time STV was used, but none were elected.

No Labour, CCF, or NDP or UFA MLA was elected in Edmonton from 1905 to 1982, except for Lionel Gibbs and Elmer Roper who were elected during the time when PR was used.

== Expansion of seats and districts in Edmonton ==
The first table shows at a glance, the number of seats available by general election in the Edmonton district. The second table shows the number of districts in Edmonton, when the Edmonton district was broken up.

=== Seats ===
Year	1905	1909-1913	1921	1926	1930	1935	1940	1944	1948	1952	1955
Seats	1	2	5	5	6	6	5	5	5	7	7

After 1956, all Alberta MLAs were elected in single member districts so since then the number of districts has been the same as the number of seats as shown in the next table.

=== Districts ===
Year	1905-1913	1917	1921-1955	1959	1963	1967	1971	1975	1979	1982	1986	1989	1993	1997	2001	2004
Districts	1*	3	1	9	10	11	16	16	18	18	17	17	18	19	19	18

- Southside Edmonton (Strathcona) was independent from Edmonton until 1912. The area that is present-day Edmonton was spread over many districts, such as Strathcona, Leduc, Sturgeon, and St. Albert. Gradually the city has grown to take in previously rural land.

For the 1913 election, Edmonton South Provincial electoral district was created from the old Strathcona constituency to elect one MLA. The Edmonton constituency elected two members by the block vote system.

== Edmonton party composition at a glance ==
The representation elected from 1926 to 1955 can be seen to be more mixed and balanced than representation elected both before and after that period. Not shown in the table below is the fact that in 1917 a Liberal and a Conservative were elected. Prior to 1926, Edmonton elected its members using first past the post or block voting. District-level proportional representation (Single transferable voting) was used from 1924 to 1955. Since 1955, Edmonton has been divide into single-member districts and has elected its MLAs through first past the post.

Affiliation	1905	1909	1913	1921	1926	1930	1935	1940	1944	1948	1952	1955
	FPTP	Block voting	Block voting	Block voting	STV	STV	STV	STV	STV	STV	STV	STV
Liberal	1	2	2	5	1	1	3			1	2	3
Conservative					2	3	1				1	1
Social Credit							2	2	2	3	3	3
Co-operative Commonwealth Federation									1	1	1	
Labour					1	1						
United Farmers of Alberta					1	1						
Veteran's & Active Force									1			
Independent Citizen's Association/People's League								3	1			
Independent												
Total	1	2	2	5	5	6	6	5	5	5	7	7

(Note: candidates of the Independent Citizens Association were members of the Unity League, an anti-SC coalition of Liberals, Conservatives and others.)

== By-elections ==
From 1924 to 1955, by-elections in Alberta were conducted using instant-runoff voting.

An Edmonton by-election held in 1924 elected a Liberal, replacing Liberal cabinet minister John R. Boyle.

A 1931 by-election in Edmonton elected a Conservative, replacing the deceased Conservative MLA C.Y. Weaver.

In 1942, Elmer Roper was elected in a by-election, replacing anti-SC People's League MLA D.M. Duggan.

Edmonton by-elections held in 1936 and 1937 saw Liberals elected to replace Liberals who had resigned or deceased respectively, so there was no change in party composition.

== Election results ==
=== 1905 ===
Cross was elected as the sole member for the Edmonton district.

1905 Alberta general election
Party	Candidate	Votes	%	±%
Liberal	Charles Wilson Cross	1,209	70.09%	–
Conservative	William Antrobus Griesbach	516	29.91%	–
Total		1,725	–	–
Rejected, spoiled and declined		N/A	–	–
Eligible electors / turnout		1,725	100.00%	–
Liberal pickup new district.				
Source(s) Source: "Edmonton-City Official Results 1905 Alberta general election". Alberta Heritage Community Foundation. The Edmonton electoral district was known as Edmonton-City for the 1905 Alberta general election.

=== 1909 ===
This election was conducted using block voting, where each Edmonton voter could cast up to two votes. The two most popular candidates were elected.

1909 Alberta general election
Party	Candidate	Votes	%	±%	Elected
Liberal	Charles Wilson Cross	3,282	40.01%	-6.22%	✓
Liberal	John Alexander McDougall	2,977	36.30%	-6.22%	✓
Conservative	Albert F. Ewing	1,595	19.45%	-10.46%	–
Independent	John Gailbraith	348	4.24%	–	–
Total		8,202	–	–	–
Rejected, spoiled and declined		N/A	–	–	–
Eligible electors / turnout		N/A	N/A	N/A	–
Liberal hold		Swing		N/A	
Source(s) Source: "Edmonton Official Results 1909 Alberta general election". Alberta Heritage Community Foundation. Note: The total number of ballots cast or eligible electors is unknown. Election held under multiple non-transferable vote to elect two members to the Legislative Assembly.

(John Galbraith was an labour-activist lawyer. He ran for an aldermanic seat in 1907 and also was author of the futuristic utopian-socialist novel In the New Capital (originally 1897; Penumbra Press reprint 1999).

=== 1912 by-election ===
Alberta provincial by-election, May 27, 1912 Ministerial by-election upon Charles Wilson Cross's appointment as Attorney-General on May 4, 1912
Party	Candidate	Votes	%	±%
Liberal	Charles Wilson Cross	1,802	47.95%	–
Conservative	Albert Ewing	1,733	47.18%	–
Socialist	Joseph R. Knight	183	4.87%	–
Total		3,758	–	–
Rejected, spoiled, and declined		N/A	–	–
Eligible electors / turnout		N/A	N/A	N/A
Liberal hold		Swing		N/A
Source(s) "By-elections". Elections Alberta.

=== 1913 ===
In the 1913 Alberta general election Premier Arthur Sifton, his lieutenant Charles Wilson Cross and Liberal candidate Alexander Grant MacKay each won nominations in two electoral districts. The Calgary Herald (a Conservative newspaper) surmised that Sifton and Cross were so scared of the electorate they felt they might not win if they ran in just one district. It accused Premier Sifton of having little confidence in his ability to return his government to power. Charles Cross was elected in both districts and sat as a member of the Legislative Assembly of Alberta for both Edmonton and Edson.

In this election Edmonton elected two MLAs. The election was conducted using block voting, where each Edmonton voter could cast up to two votes.

1913 Alberta general election
Party	Candidate	Votes	%	±%	Elected
Liberal	Charles Wilson Cross	5,407	26.29%	-13.72%	✓
Conservative	Albert Freeman Ewing	5,107	24.83%	–	✓
Liberal	Alexander Grant MacKay	4,913	23.89%	4.44%	–
Conservative	William Antrobus Griesbach	4,499	21.87%	2.43%	–
Independent	J. D. Blayney	643	3.13%	–	–
Total		20,569	–	–	–
Rejected, spoiled and declined		N/A	–	–	–
Eligible electors / turnout		14,975	N/A	N/A	–
Source(s) Source: "Edmonton Official Results 1913 Alberta general election". Alberta Heritage Community Foundation. Note: The total number of ballots cast is not known. Election held under multiple non-transferable vote for two members to the Legislative Assembly. The results do not include 10 polls which were not counted. Charles Wilson Cross was elected and chose to sit as the representative in both Edmonton and Edson. Alexander Grant MacKay is erroneously listed as a Conservative for the 1913 election in many Government of Alberta publications, likewise Albert Freeman Ewing is erroneously listed as a Liberal

(Note: Blayney was a temperance candidate.)

=== 1921 ===
This election was conducted using block voting, where each Edmonton voter could cast up to five votes. All in all, 75,758 votes were cast by the approximately 18,000 voters who voted in this election. The percentages shown in the table below indicate the proportion of the voters casting votes who cast votes in the candidate's favour.

About a third of the voters casting all five of their votes for the five Liberal candidates accrue a total of 150 "percent" of the votes while the candidates still only receive the support of a third of the voters (as measured by the support received by the most-popular Liberal candidate). With the rest of the votes split among other parties, the Liberals with possibly only a third of the voter support took all the Edmonton seats in this election.

Two Labour parties ran in this election - the Dominion Labor Party/Canadian Labor Party and the Independent Labor Party.

1921 Alberta general election
Party	Candidate	Votes	%	Elected
Liberal	Andrew Robert McLennan	6,498	36.20%	✓
Liberal	John Campbell Bowen	5,803	32.33%	✓
Liberal	Nellie McClung	5,388	30.02%	✓
Liberal	John Robert Boyle	5,361	29.86%	✓
Liberal	Jeremiah Wilfred Heffernan	5,289	29.46%	✓
United Farmers	William Jackman	4,978	27.73%	–
Conservative	Albert Freeman Ewing	4,777	26.61%	–
Labour	A. A. Campbell	3,736	20.81%	–
Conservative	Herbert Howard Crawford	3,553	19.79%	–
Conservative	Elizabeth Ferris	3,188	17.76%	–
Labour	Robert McCreath	2,931	16.33%	–
Independent	Joseph Woods Adair	2,571	14.32%	–
Labour	Elmer Roper	2,515	14.01%	–
Conservative	Ambrose Upton Gledstanes Bury	2,509	13.98%	–
Conservative	William A. Wells	2,329	12.97%	–
Independent	James Kennedy Cornwall	2,082	11.60%	–
Independent	A. L. Marks	1,744	9.72%	–
Independent Liberal	Gerald Pelton	1,467	8.17%	–
Independent	William Short	1,447	8.06%	–
Independent Labour	William R. Ball	1,409	7.85%	–
Independent	A. Boileau	1,226	6.83%	–
Independent Labour	Mary Cantin	1,133	6.31%	–
Independent Labour	Ernest Brown	1,073	5.98%	–
Independent Labour	James Bailey	941	5.24%	–
Independent Labour	Joe E. White	927	5.16%	–
Labour Socialist	Marie Millard	883	4.92%	–
Total votes cast		17,951	–	–
Rejected, spoiled and declined		N/A	–	–
Eligible electors / turnout		N/A	N/A	N/A
Source(s) Source: "Edmonton Official Results 1921 Alberta general election". Alberta Heritage Community Foundation. Election held under multiple non-transferable vote for five members to the Legislative Assembly.

=== 1924 by-election ===
The first election in Alberta to use ranked voting took place in Edmonton on October 27, following the resignation of Edmonton MLA J.R. Boyle. The by-election winner was determined using Instant-runoff voting, which had just been adopted for election of a single member in a by-election.

W.T. Henry got the most votes in the first count but no candidate received a majority so subsequent counts were held using second choices of the lower-ranking candidates, Independent G.V. Pelton and Labour's H.M. Bartholomew. Henry was elected on the third count, with 5472 votes to A.F. Ewing's 5448.

The Labour candidate H.M. Bartholomew, a Communist Party member, showed a strong third place showing, almost exceeding the Conservative candidate on the second count.

The Edmonton Bulletin criticized the new electoral system, saying that the winner was not announced until four days after the election. It wondered whether it might take even longer when several members were being elected and where dozens of candidate were in the field. The writer admitted the "delay may not be materially important but it does lessen popular interest in the election." It saw inconsistency in that the second choices of Pelton's and Bartholomew's supporters were counted while those of Ewing's and Henry's supporters were not counted (although each vote was only counted for one candidate at the end). It also bemoaned that 1359 voters had had their ballot declared spoiled, and pointed out the "delusion" that representation by someone who was not the voter's first choice was any kind of real representation.

Some of these views were refuted by a representative of the Proportional Representation League in the pages of the Edmonton Journal a short time later who clarified that counting Henry's or Ewing's supporters' secondary choices might have produced a result that was not intended by those voters themselves; that secondary preferences under instant-runoff voting were used as backup contingency votes only, for a reason; that no one can get representation from someone who does not share their views but such is the myth all the time under first past the post. He predicted that in most future Edmonton elections, when STV would be used, several members would be elected and each would be able to truly represent only his or her own supporters with no pretense at representing all who live in the city.

=== 1926 ===
Unlike the previous election, starting in 1926, the general election was held using Single transferable voting. The districting remained the same with all of Edmonton in one city-wide district electing multiple members but now each voter cast just one vote.

In this election, 18,154 valid ballots were cast in Edmonton. About 751 were rejected for being improperly filled out, a proportion of about 4 percent.

Under the STV procedure used, the quota that guaranteed winning a seat was set as the Droop quota. This quota was 3026 (18,154 divided by 6, one more than the number of seats being contested, plus 1).

As candidates were eliminated, their votes were transferred to the remaining candidates in accordance with back-up preferences marked by the voter. (Marking of back-up preferences was voluntary and some voters simply marked jut one preference, their first choice. Votes eligible for transfer that had no next usable back-up preference were routed to the exhausted pile, but at the and only ten percent of the votes had had to be sidelined that way.)

With voters at complete liberty to rank the candidates along whatever criterion they wanted, some votes were transferred across party lines. Thus naturally the result under STV differed from the party vote shares as per first preferences. But in this case the results were roughly proportional to each party's take of the first preference votes with two Conservatives, a Liberal, a Labour, and a UFA winning seats. Labour and UFA were elected to their first Edmonton seat in this election, Edmonton's first PR election. This fairness was achieved not by reference to party shares but by the system's ability to produce high proportion of effective votes — votes actually used to elect someone. in this case, more than 14,000 votes, of the district's 18,000 valid votes, were used to actually elect someone, a rate of 78 percent.

The UFA ran one candidate, J.F. Lymburn. He led the polls, achieving quota in the first count and being declared elected. (Many of his surplus votes went to Labour candidates.) He was elected with just first preferences. All the other successful candidates were elected with mixture of first preference votes and votes transferred to them from unsuccessful candidates. They also each had votes received by early successful candidates that were transferred due to being surplus to the quota.

Prevey (Liberal) and Duggan (Conservative) won seats without the quota in the last count, after other candidates were eliminated or elected.

Not all the five candidates who were most popular in the first count were elected in the end.

Independent Liberal Joe Clarke received many votes on the first count but did not make quota in the first count and did not pick up enough votes from other candidates' later preferences to get quota, likely due to not being in a political party.

Liberal candidate J.C. Bowen was in the top five in first count, but also did not get quota and despite being in a party and thus likely to receive vote transfers, was not elected — many of the other Liberal party candidates' votes were transferred not to him but instead to another Liberal candidate, W.W. Prevey, a more popular individual overall, it seems. Eventually Prevey's vote total surpassed Bowen's, and Bowen, not Prevey, was eliminated when his turn came.

Labour although not having anyone in top five spots in first count, did capture a seat. This was proportional — its five candidates received about 20 percent of the vote, which was more than quota. STV's transferable votes generally prevent bad effects of vote splitting, by allowing a party's dispersed votes to be concentrated on one or two leading party candidates as happened in this case. Farmilo, the leading Labour candidate in the first count, was not elected though. Gibbs apparently as an individual was more popular overall than Farmilo. He got quota in a later count through distribution of other candidates' second preferences. This included both votes of supporters of his fellow Labour candidates and some supporters of Joe Clarke and other non-Labour candidates as well.

The Conservative party ran five candidates. The vote was spread among all five in the first count. None got quota in the first count. Weaver did better after three of his companion Conservative candidates were eliminated and was elected.

Another Conservative (Duggan) — plus a Liberal (Prevey) — got seats by being relatively popular among the last ones still standing as the field of candidates thinned to just one more than the number of remaining open seats, at which time the two top remaining candidates — Conservative Duggan and Liberal Prevey — were declared elected, although not having quota.

The order of election was Lymburn 1, Weaver 2, Gibbs 3, Prevey 4, and Duggan 5.

1926 Alberta general election
Party	Candidate	Votes 1st count	%	Votes final count	Elected
United Farmers	John Lymburn	3,046	16.27%	3,026	✓
Conservative	Charles Yardley Weaver	2,202	11.76%	3,026	✓
Liberal	Warren Prevey	1,517	8.10%	2,940	✓
Independent Liberal	Joseph Clarke	1,179	6.30%	–	–
Liberal	John C. Bowen	1,147	6.13%	–	–
Independent	Samuel Barnes	1,060	5.66%	–	–
Labour	Alfred Farmilo	973	5.20%	–	–
Conservative	F. J. Folinsbee	881	4.71%	–	–
Labour	Charles Gibbs	879	4.70%	3,026	✓
Liberal	William Thomas Henry	858	4.58%	–	–
Conservative	David Duggan	857	4.58%	2,265	✓
Conservative	Herbert Crawford	782	4.18%	–	–
Labour	James W. Findlay	628	3.35%	–	–
Labour	Jan Lakeman	605	3.23%	–	–
Liberal	William Rae	561	3.00%	–	–
Labour	Elmer Roper	478	2.55%	–	–
Conservative	Mark W. Robertson	361	1.93%	–	–
Independent	John W. Leedy	140	0.75%	–	–
Total		18,154	–	–	–
Rejected, spoiled and declined		567	–	–	–
Eligible electors / turnout		33,741	55.48%	–	–
Source(s) Source: "Edmonton Official Results 1926 Alberta general election". Alberta Heritage Community Foundation. Election held under single transferable vote with a quota of 3,026 to elect five members to the Legislative Assembly.

=== 1930 ===
Quota was 3028

1930 Alberta general election
Party	Candidate	Votes 1st count	%	Votes final count	Elected
United Farmers	John Lymburn	3,230	14.76%	3,028	✓
Conservative	David Duggan	2,665	12.18%	3,028	✓
Labour	Charles Gibbs	2,262	10.34%	3,028	✓
Conservative	Charles Weaver	2,013	9.20%	2,903	✓
Liberal	William R. Howson	1,835	8.39%	2,915	✓
Conservative	William Atkinson	1,786	8.16%	2,360	✓
Liberal	Warren Prevey	1,331	6.08%	–	–
Liberal	James Collisson	1,040	4.75%	–	–
Labour	Alfred Farmilo	832	3.80%	–	–
Labour	Samuel Barnes	818	3.74%	–	–
Independent	Jan Lakeman	752	3.44%	–	–
Labour	Daniel Kennedy Knott	745	3.41%	–	–
Conservative	N. C. Willson	451	2.06%	–	–
Liberal	G. V. Pelton	442	2.02%	–	–
Conservative	J. A. Buchanan	424	1.94%	–	–
Independent	Joseph Clarke	374	1.71%	–	–
Conservative	R. D. Tighe	189	0.86%	–	–
Total		21,189	–	–	–
Rejected, spoiled and declined		690	–	–	–
Eligible electors / turnout		39,209	55.80%	–	–
Source(s) Source: "Edmonton Official Results 1930 Alberta general election". Alberta Heritage Community Foundation. Election held under single transferable vote with a quota of 3,028 to elect six members to the Legislative Assembly.

=== 1935 ===
Six were elected. Quota was 5324

1935 Alberta general election
Party	Candidate	Votes 1st count	%	Votes final count	Elected
Liberal	William Howson	9,139	24.52%	5,324	✓
Social Credit	Samuel A. Barnes	4,476	12.01%	5,324	✓
Social Credit	W. S. Hall	2,818	7.56%	–	–
Social Credit	David B. Mullen	2,500	6.71%	4,932	✓
United Farmers	John Farquhar Lymburnn	2,092	5.61%	–	–
Social Credit	Orvis A. Kennedy	1,781	4.78%	–	–
Conservative	David Milwyn Duggan	1,466	3.93%	5,078	✓
Liberal	George Van Allen	1,255	3.37%	5,324	✓
Social Credit	Mark W. Robertson	1,243	3.34%	–	–
Liberal	Marion Conroy	1,238	3.32%	–	–
Conservative	William Atkinson	1,220	3.27%	–	–
Liberal	Gerald O'Connor	1,116	2.99%	4,922	✓
Communist	Jan Lakeman	1,096	2.94%	–	–
Conservative	Frederick Jamieson	1,029	2.76%	–	–
Social Credit	G. L. King	843	2.26%	–	–
Liberal	J. C. M. Marshall	673	1.81%	–	–
Conservative	J. E. Basarab	671	1.80%	–	–
Liberal	Walter Morrish	612	1.64%	–	–
Labour	James East	505	1.36%	–	–
Conservative	Emily Fitzsimon	363	0.97%	–	–
Labour	James W. Findlay	331	0.89%	–	–
Economic Reconstruction	Elsie Wright	192	0.52%	–	–
Labour	Carl Berg	192	0.52%	–	–
Labour	Sidney Bowcott	166	0.45%	–	–
Labour	Alfred Farmilo	127	0.34%	–	–
Conservative	D. M. Ramsay	71	0.19%	–	–
Labour	Sidney Parsons	52	0.14%	–	–
Total		37,267	–	–	–
Rejected, spoiled and declined		785	–	–	–
Eligible electors / turnout		49,212	77.32%	–	–
Source(s) Source: "Edmonton Official Results 1935 Alberta general election". Alberta Heritage Community Foundation. Election held under single transferable vote to elect six members to the Legislative Assembly.

=== 1936 by-election ===
By-election necessitated by MLA Howson's resignation. Instant-runoff voting but no vote transfers conducted Liberal W. Morrish elected with majority of votes on the first count, defeating Margaret Crang and Harry Ainlay.

=== 1937 by-election ===
By-election necessitated by death of George Van Allen.

Instant-runoff voting but no vote transfers were conducted.

Liberal E.L. Gray was elected with majority of votes on the first count, defeating Margaret Crang, Joe Clarke, Jan Lakeman and Rice Sheppard.

=== 1940 ===
Five seats were open in this election. The quota, the number of votes certain to win a seat, was 7291.

This election saw an anti-SC movement, made up of Liberals, Conservatives, and some UFA-ers, get many seats. Page, Duggan and Macdonald were elected in Edmonton this election as candidates of the People's League AKA Unity Movement, recorded as Independent in results below. Four of that group's candidates placed in the top five spots in the first count, but this was un-proportional and the process thinned them down.

SC candidate Norman James placed low in the first count but got enough votes from other candidates who were dropped out, and from Manning's surplus votes, to take a seat, pushing out O'Connor, a Unity League candidate. He did this without achieving quota but by being one of the last ones standing when the field of candidates thinned out. Due to his personal popularity, he leapfrogged over a couple SC candidates to take the seat, demonstrating that the STV-PR is about voters' preferences for individual candidates and not party lists.

The order of election was Manning 1, Page 2, James 3, Duggan 4, H.J. Macdonald 5.

1940 Alberta general election
Party	Candidate	Votes 1st count	%	Votes final count	Elected
Social Credit	Ernest Manning	10,066	23.32%	7,291	✓
Independent Movement	John Percy Page	5,607	12.99%	7,291	✓
Independent Movement	Hugh John MacDonald	4,128	9.56%	6,649	✓
Independent Movement	David Milwyn Duggan	3,878	8.98%	6,731	✓
Independent Movement	Gerald O'Connor	3,392	7.86%	–	–
Independent Movement	L. Y. Cairns	3,316	7.68%	–	–
Co-operative Commonwealth	Elmer Roper	1,984	4.60%	–	–
Co-operative Commonwealth	Harry Dean Ainlay	1,840	4.26%	–	–
Independent	E. C. Fisher	1,607	3.72%	–	–
Social Credit	Charles Gould	1,192	2.76%	–	–
Social Credit	Elisha East	1,117	2.59%	–	–
Communist	James A. MacPherson	1,067	2.47%	–	–
Social Credit	Norman B. James	967	2.24%	7,133	✓
Social Credit	Charles B. Wills	948	2.20%	–	–
Independent	Marjorie Pardee	822	1.90%	–	–
Co-operative Commonwealth	William H. Miller	442	1.02%	–	–
Independent	G. F. Hustler	400	0.93%	–	–
Independent Progressive	Samuel Barnes	282	0.65%	–	–
Independent Progressive	J. H. Green	108	0.25%	–	–
Total		43,163	–	–	–
Rejected, spoiled and declined		1,784	–	–	–
Eligible electors / turnout		59,685	75.31%	–	–
Source(s) "Edmonton results 1940 Alberta general election". Alberta Online Encyclopedia. Note: Five seats were awarded in the Edmonton Electoral District through single transferable vote. The Hare Quota, the number of votes needed to win a seat, was 7,291. Ernest Manning and John P. Page were elected on the first count.

Many of the candidates listed as independents, such as sitting MLA D.M. Duggan, were candidates for the Unity League, an anti-SC alliance of Conservatives, Liberals and others.

=== 1942 by-election ===
After D.M. Duggan's passing in May 1942, his Edmonton seat was filled in a by-election.

This by-election was run according to Instant-runoff voting, which was used for all by-elections in Alberta in the 1924-1955 period. Voters across Edmonton voted as the city was a single constituency at this time.

There was only one seat being contested. Under IRV ( Alternative Vote), the winner had to take a majority of the valid votes.

The CCF candidate, Elmer Roper, came in first on the first count. Lymburn, a former UFA cabinet minister, was running as an anti-SC Unity League candidate. In the first count his vote total swas less than that of the SC candidate. Roper however did not take a majority of the vote, so votes belonging to the lesser candidates were transferred. These transfers allowed Lymburn to pass the SC candidate. But no one took a majority of votes until after the fourth round of counting.

The winner was not known until after the fourth round, after three of the five candidates were eliminated and their votes transferred. Many ballots were exhausted because about half of the voters who voted for the SC, Soldiers Rep and Liberal candidates did not give second preferences.

Finally after the SC candidate, who had been second in the first count, was dropped off in the fourth round, there were only two candidates and one or the other of the candidates — Roper or Lymburn — would take a majority of the votes still in play. It is possible that in the 4th round, when the SC candidate was dropped off, most of his voters' second preferences went to Roper, apparently being thought more in tune with SC's help-the-little-guy philosophy than the business-minded Conservative/Liberal-member-dominated Unity League.

September 22, 1942 by-election		Turnout 32.71%				
Affiliation	Candidate	1st votes	%	4th votes	%	Count
Cooperative Commonwealth	Elmer Roper	4,834	24.76%	8,432	53.98%	4th
Social Credit	G.B. Giles	4,432	22.70%	Eliminated prior to 4th count		
Independent	John Lymburn	4,032	20.65%	7,188	46.02%	4th
Soldier Representative	W. Griffin	3,389	17.36%	Eliminated prior to 3rd count		
Liberal	N.V. Buchanan	2,838	14.53%	Eliminated prior to 2nd count		
Valid Ballots		19,525	100%	15,620	100%	
Exhausted Ballots				3,905	4 Counts	

=== 1944 ===
This election was held under Hare Single Transferable Voting STV-PR system.

1944 quota was 6306 (just more than one-sixth of the total valid ballots). Premier Manning got quota in the first count, with 8,000 votes to spare. His surplus votes (enough on their own to elect another candidate) were spread among the other four SC candidates (according to the voter's next marked preference) so none of the other SC candidates received enough in the 2nd Count to take a seat right off.

Page, running for the anti-SC Unity League, here identified as Independent, was in top five in the first count. The League, winding down, ran only one candidate and League votes were not spread around. He took enough votes in the first count to hold on to take a seat in later counts.

Johnnie Caine, a WWII ace, running as an independent, was personally popular but did not get quota in the first count and not having a party behind him, did not receive many of the other candidates' second preferences when they were dropped off.

The first candidates to be eliminated were mostly Communists and CCF candidates, whose voters it seems gave their second preferences to their own, such as Roper who was re-elected to the seat he had won in the 1942 by-election, and then eventually to Norman James, of the SC party. James and William J. Williams were the last two standing when the field of candidates thinned out and they took seats even without achieving the quota.

1944 Alberta general election
Party	Candidate	Votes 1st count	%	Votes final count	Elected
Social Credit	Ernest Manning	14,271	38.45%	6,306	✓
Co-operative Commonwealth	Elmer Roper	5,253	14.15%	6,345	✓
Independent Movement	John Percy Page	4,603	12.40%	6,333	✓
Veterans' and Active Force	William J. Williams	2,818	7.59%	5,535	✓
Independent	Johnnie Caine	1,400	3.77%	–	–
Social Credit	Henry Carrigan	1,188	3.20%	–	–
Social Credit	Orvis A. Kennedy	876	2.36%	–	–
Co-operative Commonwealth	Clifford Lee	854	2.30%	–	–
Social Credit	Norman B. James	781	2.10%	3,532	✓
Social Credit	John Gillies	755	2.03%	–	–
Labor-Progressive	James A. MacPherson	742	2.00%	–	–
Co-operative Commonwealth	James Enright	649	1.75%	–	–
Co-operative Commonwealth	M. E. Butterworth	549	1.48%	–	–
Co-operative Commonwealth	Joseph Dowler	545	1.47%	–	–
Labor-Progressive	William Halina	496	1.34%	–	–
Independent	Cecil Chapman	476	1.28%	–	–
Independent	Clarence Richards	422	1.14%	–	–
Labor-Progressive	Jan Lakeman	251	0.68%	–	–
Labor-Progressive	Alex Herd	119	0.32%	–	–
Labor-Progressive	G.V. Murdoch	72	0.19%	–	–
Total		37,120	–	–	–
Rejected, spoiled and declined		2,927	–	–	–
Eligible electors / turnout		65,651	61.00%	–	–
Source(s) "Edmonton results 1944 Alberta general election". Alberta Online Encyclopedia. Note: Five seats were awarded in the Edmonton Electoral District through single transferable vote. The Hare Quota, the number of votes needed to win a seat, was 6,306. Ernest Manning was elected on the first count.

=== 1948 ===
This election was held under Single Transferable Voting STV-PR system, using the Droop quota.

Five were elected.

The quota was 7692, one sixth of the 46,150 total valid votes. Manning got it in first count, with 14,000 votes to spare. His surplus votes helped elect two other SC candidates, Heard and Adams, at the end.

Prowse also got quota but no other Liberal got in on his shirt-tails.

CCF's Elmer Roper too exceeded quota, near to the end. His surplus was not distributed, perhaps because by then the count was at an end with only two candidates left standing to fill two remaining seats. Two SC-ers, Heard and Clayton, took these without achieving quota.

Result was roughly proportional to the first preference vote shares of the three parties that ran in this contest. (The Conservatives stayed out, supporting Page, an opponent of the SC government, running for the Independent Citizens' Association.)

Premier Manning alone took almost half the votes in the first count, and his party took more than half the seats. The CCF took one sixth of the first preference votes and one-fifth of the seats. The Liberals took about one-fifth the votes and one-fifth of the seats. Only about one-tenth of the votes were wasted — this included Page.

On a candidate basis, two of the top five in the first count were not elected. Page was not popular with enough second preferences, while Liberal Lazarowich also did not have holding power. (SC-ers Heard and Clayton replaced them in the top five to take seats.)

1948 Alberta general election
Party	Candidate	Votes 1st count	%	Votes final count	Elected
Social Credit	Ernest Manning	22,014	47.45%	7,692	✓
Co-operative Commonwealth	Elmer Roper	6,511	14.03%	8,684	✓
Liberal	James Harper Prowse	6,302	13.58%	7,692	✓
Independent Citizen's	John Percy Page	2,723	5.87%	–	–
Liberal	Peter Lazarowich	1,234	2.66%	–	–
Co-operative Commonwealth	Jack Hampson	1,046	2.25%	–	–
Social Credit	Clayton Adams	946	2.04%	7,559	✓
Liberal	Mary Scullion	942	2.03%	–	–
Social Credit	Lou Heard	890	1.92%	7,746	✓
Social Credit	John Gillies	772	1.66%	–	–
Co-operative Commonwealth	Mary Crawford	618	1.33%	–	–
Liberal	Francis Ford	565	1.22%	–	–
Social Credit	Walter Crockett	523	1.13%	–	–
Co-operative Commonwealth	Arthur Thornton	498	1.07%	–	–
Co-operative Commonwealth	J. H. Dowler	370	0.80%	–	–
Liberal	William Brownlee	442	0.95%	–	–
Total		46,396	–	–	–
Rejected, spoiled and declined		880	–	–	–
Eligible electors / turnout		84,391	56.02%	–	–
Source(s) "Edmonton results 1948 Alberta general election". Alberta Online Encyclopedia. Note: Five seats were awarded in the Edmonton Electoral District through single transferable vote. The Hare Quota, the number of votes needed to win a seat, was 7,692. Ernest Manning was elected on the first count.

=== 1952 ===
This election, like the previous six, was held under Hare Single Transferable Voting STV-PR system. Seven seats were filled. Quota was 6,505, one-eighth of the 52,039 total valid votes. Five of the seven in winning positions in the First Count were elected at the end.

Manning and Prowse won in the first Count, with votes to spare. Their surplus votes were transferred to a less-popular SC and a Liberal candidate respectively, who then were elected themselves.

Three were elected with partial quotas at the end.

Seats in the end were allocated proportionally to the parties' share of the votes — SC party taking three seats, Liberals taking two, and a Conservative and CCF member also being elected.

1952 Alberta general election
Party	Candidate	Votes 1st count	%	Votes final count	Elected
Social Credit	Ernest Manning	17,022	29.73%	6,505	✓
Liberal	James Harper Prowse	7,264	12.69%	6,505	✓
Co-operative Commonwealth	Elmer Roper	6,632	11.58%	6,505	✓
Conservative	John Percy Page	2,212	3.86%	5,504	✓
Social Credit	Joseph Donovan Ross	1,757	3.07%	6,505	✓
Social Credit	Ambrose Holowach	1,381	2.41%	–	–
Liberal	Andre Milville Dechene	1,340	2.34%	–	–
Liberal	Peter J. Lazarowich	1,136	1.98%	–	–
Social Credit	Harry D. Carrigan	1,135	1.98%	–	–
Social Credit	Stella M. Baker	1,126	1.97%	–	–
Conservative	Marshall E. Manning	1,060	1.85%	–	–
Liberal	Harold Tanner	875	1.53%	4,921	✓
Social Credit	Williston Haszard	834	1.46%	–	–
Labor-Progressive	Bernard R. Swankey	824	1.44%	–	–
Liberal	Cora Casselman	819	1.43%	–	–
Social Credit	Edgar Gerhart	769	1.34%	5,895	✓
Co-operative Commonwealth	Robert Atkin	658	1.15%	–	–
Liberal	Laurette C. Douglas	632	1.10%	–	–
Co-operative Commonwealth	Roy Jamha	619	1.08%	–	–
Co-operative Commonwealth	Arthur E. Thornton	612	1.07%	–	–
Liberal	Duncan Innes	608	1.06%	–	–
Co-operative Commonwealth	Floyd Albin Johnson	500	0.87%	–	–
Conservative	Marcel Lambert	432	0.75%	–	–
Conservative	Frederick John Mitchell	430	0.75%	–	–
Co-operative Commonwealth	Norman Finnemore	413	0.72%	–	–
Co-operative Commonwealth	Winnifred Scott	383	0.67%	–	–
Conservative	Mrs. Arnold Taylor	272	0.48%	–	–
Conservative	John A. L. Smith	189	0.33%	–	–
Conservative	Edward Sturrock	105	0.18%	–	–
Total		52,039	–	–	–
Rejected, spoiled and declined		5,217	–	–	–
Eligible electors / turnout		108,424	52.81%	–	–
Source(s) "Edmonton results 1952 Alberta general election". Alberta Online Encyclopedia. Note: Seven seats were awarded in the Edmonton Electoral District through single transferable vote. The Hare Quota, the number of votes needed to win a seat, was 6,505. Ernest Manning, James Harper Prowse, and Elmer Roper were elected on the first count.

=== 1955 ===
This election was held under Hare Single Transferable Voting STV-PR system.

Seven members being elected (through STV)

Total votes cast: 82,792 votes.

6,248 votes were spoiled and declared rejected. This was said to be due to a change of rules. Outside Edmonton, votes marked with an X were now rejected while previously they had been accepted. And this rule change there might have confused Edmonton voters. Another possible cause was that elections with higher than normal turnout saw inexperienced voters attempting to mark ranked ballots for the first time. Edmonton suffering more than 9 percent spoiled votes in 1952 was possibly caused by the strict rules that election officials had to use — by law any ballot not marked with a "1" was rejected even if the mark used by the voters might have clearly signalled their intention.

Quota was 9,569, just more than one-eighth of the 76,544 valid votes. This amount guaranteed election but it was possible to be elected with fewer votes.

1955 Alberta general election
Party	Candidate	Votes 1st count	%	Votes final count	Elected
Social Credit	Ernest Charles Manning	23,216	30.33%	9,569	✓
Liberal	James Harper Prowse	18,755	24.50%	9,569	✓
Co-operative Commonwealth	Elmer Ernest Roper	4,444	5.81%	–	–
Conservative	John Percy Page	4,086	5.34%	9,224	✓
Liberal	Edgar Bailey	2,971	3.88%	–	–
Liberal	Andre Dechene	2,877	3.76%	–	–
Liberal	Abe William Miller	2,787	3.64%	9,569	✓
Social Credit	Anthony Hlynka	1,896	2.48%	–	–
Liberal	J. Laurier Payment	1,640	2.14%	–	–
Liberal	Harold Tanner	1,604	2.10%	9,569	✓
Social Credit	Joseph Donovan Ross	1,575	2.06%	9,483	✓
Social Credit	Edgar Gerhart	1,320	1.72%	9,121	✓
Conservative	Gifford Main	1,064	1.39%	–	–
Labor-Progressive	William Harasym	947	1.24%	–	–
Co-operative Commonwealth	Robert Atkin	940	1.23%	–	–
Social Credit	William J.M. Henning	785	1.03%	–	–
Conservative	Gerard Amerongen	692	0.90%	–	–
Social Credit	Cyril G. Havard	602	0.79%	–	–
Social Credit	Mrs. C.N. Hattersley	555	0.73%	–	–
Liberal	Lois Grant	552	0.72%	–	–
Conservative	Robert F. Lambert	548	0.72%	–	–
Co-operative Commonwealth	Floyd Johnson	458	0.60%	–	–
Conservative	Frederick John Mitchell	405	0.53%	–	–
Co-operative Commonwealth	Mary Crawford	383	0.50%	–	–
Co-operative Commonwealth	Ivor G. Dent	328	0.43%	–	–
Conservative	Mrs. John A. L. Smith	299	0.39%	–	–
Co-operative Commonwealth	Arthur E. Thompson	290	0.38%	–	–
Conservative	Robert L. Brower	221	0.29%	–	–
Co-operative Commonwealth	Hubert M. Smith	177	0.23%	–	–
Independent	Charles E. Payne	127	0.17%	–	–
Total		76,544	–	–	–
Rejected, spoiled and declined		6,248	–	–	–
Eligible electors / turnout		127,069	65.15%	–	–
Source(s) "Edmonton results 1955 Alberta general election". Alberta Online Encyclopedia. Note: Seven seats were awarded in the Edmonton Electoral District through single transferable vote. The Hare Quota, the number of votes needed to win a seat, was 5,969.

=== 1924-1942 by-elections ===
These by-elections were conducted using instant-runoff voting (alternative voting). Vote totals given are the first count tallies. In each case, the leader in the first count was elected in the end.

Party	1942	1937	1936	1931	1924
Liberal	N.V. Buchanan; 2838	Edward Leslie Gray; 17,788	W. Morrish; 9,863	John C. Bowen; 2,934	William Thomas Henry; 4,640
Conservative			Frederick Jamieson; 8,026	Albert Ewing; 4,238	
Labour					H.M. Bartholomew; 4,118
Cooperative Commonwealth Federation	Elmer Roper; 4,834 (elected in the end)		Harry Dean Ainlay; 2,056		
People's Candidate		Joseph Clarke; 10,000			
Progressive Labour "United Front" (Labour/SC)		Margaret Crang; 1,275	Margaret Crang; 6,129		
Social Credit	J.B. Giles; 4,432				
Soldier Representative	W. Griffin; 3,389				
Communist		Jan Lakeman; 1,779		Jan Lakeman; 813	
Independent	J.F. Lymburn; 4,022	Rice Sheppard; 257			G.V. Pelton; 1,131

== Plebiscite results ==
=== 1915 Prohibition referendum ===
A majority of Edmonton voters voted in favour of Prohibition on July 21, 1915. A total of 5,700 (63 percent) voted for Prohibition; 3,386 (37 percent) voted against.

=== 1923 Prohibition-cancellation referendum ===
A majority of Edmonton voters voted in favour of Prohibition on November 5, 1923. A majority of 3549 voted for replacing Prohibition with government control of liquor sales.

=== 1948 electrification plebiscite ===
District results from the 1948 province wide plebiscite on electricity regulation.

Option A	Option B
Are you in favour of the generation and distribution of electricity being continued by the Power Companies?	Are you in favour of the generation and distribution of electricity being made a publicly owned utility administered by the Alberta Government Power Commission?
22,351 50.99%	21,478 49.01%
Province wide result: Option A passed.

The result in Edmonton was closely balanced. In part this was due to the choice being between electrical generation by a city-owned corporation or by the provincial government.

=== 1957 liquor plebiscite ===
1957 Alberta liquor plebiscite results: Edmonton
Question A: Do you approve additional types of outlets for the sale of beer, wine and spirituous liquor subject to a local vote?
Ballot choice	Votes	%
Yes	46,219	71.98%
No	17,994	28.02%
Total votes	64,213	100%
Rejected, spoiled and declined	75	
127,279 eligible electors, turnout 50.94%
Question B2: Should mixed drinking be allowed in beer parlours in Edmonton and the surrounding areas?
Ballot choice	Votes	%
Yes	48,645	75.85%
No	15,485	24.15%
Total votes	64,134	100%
Rejected, spoiled and declined	622	
127,279 eligible electors, turnout 50.88%

On October 30, 1957, a stand-alone plebiscite was held province wide in all 50 of the then current provincial electoral districts in Alberta. The government decided to consult Alberta voters to decide on liquor sales and mixed drinking after a divisive debate in the Legislature. The plebiscite was intended to deal with the growing demand for reforming antiquated liquor control laws.

The plebiscite was conducted in two parts. Question A asked in all districts, asked the voters if the sale of liquor should be expanded in Alberta, while Question B asked in a handful of districts within the corporate limits of Calgary and Edmonton asked if men and woman were allowed to drink together in establishments. Question B was slightly modified depending on which city the voters were in.

Province wide Question A of the plebiscite passed in 33 of the 50 districts while Question B passed in all five districts. Edmonton voted overwhelmingly in favour of the plebiscite. The district recorded slightly above average voter turnout almost just over the province wide 46% average with over half of eligible voters casting a ballot.

Edmonton also voted on Question B2. Residents voted for mixed drinking with a super majority. Turnout for question B. Turnout for Question B was slightly lower than for Question A.

Official district returns were released to the public on December 31, 1957. The Social Credit government in power at the time did not consider the results binding. However the results of the vote led the government to repeal all existing liquor legislation and introduce an entirely new Liquor Act.

Municipal districts lying inside electoral districts that voted against the Plebiscite were designated Local Option Zones by the Alberta Liquor Control Board and considered effective dry zones. Business owners that wanted a liquor licence had to petition for a binding municipal plebiscite and then get approval from voters in order to be granted a licence.

== See also ==
- List of Alberta provincial electoral districts
- Canadian provincial electoral districts
