= Rice Sheppard =

Canadian politician and farmers' activist

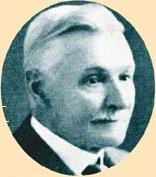

Alderman on the Edmonton City Council
- In office December 8, 1913 – December 13, 1915
- In office December 8, 1919 – December 12, 1921
- In office December 11, 1922 – December 8, 1924
- In office December 10, 1928 – November 14, 1934

Personal details
- Born: April 2, 1861 Lambourne, Berks, England
- Died: August 26, 1947 (aged 86) Edmonton, Alberta
- Party: Labour, Independent
- Other political affiliations: Conservative Party of Alberta; Social Credit; United Farmers of Alberta; Civic Progressive Association
- Spouse(s): Elizabeth Mary Major (died 1929), Henrietta Rattan
- Profession: Farmer

Rice Sheppard (April 2, 1861 – August 26, 1947) was a politician and farmers' activist in Alberta, Canada. He served on Edmonton City Council for many years, ran for mayoral, provincial, and federal office, and was an executive member of the United Farmers of Alberta.

== Early life ==
Sheppard was born April 2, 1861, in Lambourn, Berkshire, England and was educated at the Wesleyan School. His father was James Sheppard, who was married to Louisa (née Barrett) Sheppard and in total they had 13 children. Family stories say that the Sheppard family was thrown out of Lambourn by the Squire for not being Church of England, although this would have been unlikely as there were many non-conformists in the town by this time, and there was no effective 'squire' anymore. James and Louisa moved to Essex, England. Rice took his first job when he was ten years old, working at a store. At the age of twenty-one, he opened a bakery in Clapham; this business expanded to four shops by the time that he sold it in 1897. In 1883, he married Elizabeth Mary Major (she died in 1929, after which Sheppard married Henriette Rattan).

He (with his wife and family) emigrated to Canada in 1897, and took up farming near South Edmonton (Strathcona, Alberta). They ultimately had 14 children, some in Britain and more in Alberta.

== Political career ==
=== Provincial politics ===
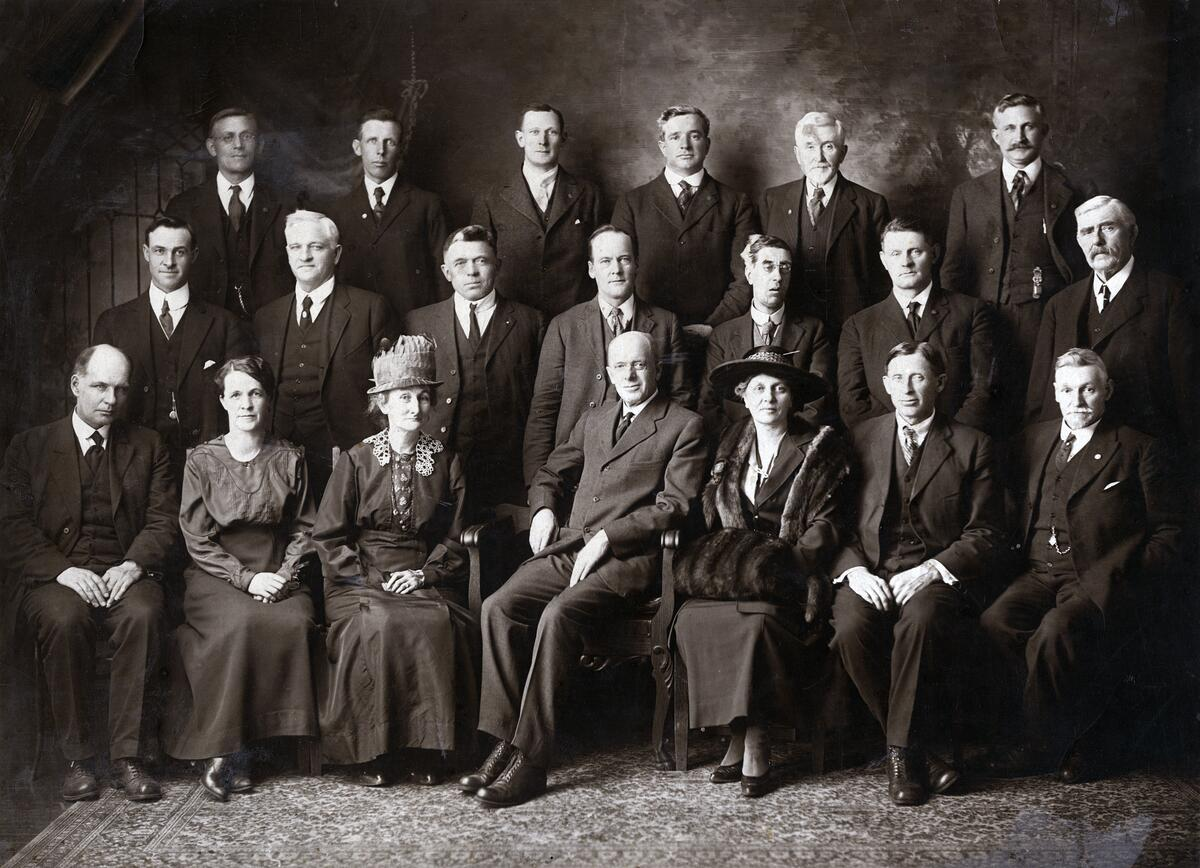
Board of Directors of the United Farmers of Alberta in 1919. Sheppard is on the right in the bottom row.

Sheppard's first bid for elected office took place in the 1909 provincial election, when he sought election to the Legislative Assembly of Alberta as a Conservative candidate in Strathcona. He was soundly defeated in the two person race by the incumbent, Liberal Premier Alexander Rutherford. Around the same time, Sheppard was active with the Temperance and Moral Reform League of Alberta, which advocated for prohibition in Alberta. Their efforts would be successful in 1916.

In 1905, Sheppard helped found the Alberta Farmers Association which held meetings in the Ross Block, still standing in Old Strathcona, Edmonton. Sheppard helped negotiate the 1909 merging of the local Society of Equity farmers' groups with the AFA to form the United Farmers of Alberta, which grew into a powerful co-op store chain, a lobby group and a political party (1919–1939).

Sheppard was a member of a committee responsible for setting up Alberta's first municipal hospitals (the committee was chaired by UFA Health Convenor Irene Parlby and also included UFA President Henry Wise Wood and future Premier Herbert Greenfield). Although he ran for nomination as candidate for the UFA he was not successful and never ran for the party.

He sought provincial office in a 1937 by-election in Edmonton. As the UFA had effectively disbanded its political arm after its total defeat in the 1935 election (it would do so formally in 1939), it did not run a candidate in the by-election. Sheppard, who by then had transferred his allegiance to the new Social Credit government, ran as an independent. He finished last of five candidates with less than one percent of the vote, as Edward Leslie Gray held the seat for the Liberals. (Sheppard's other opponents were Joseph Clarke, Margaret Crang, and Jan Lakeman, all of whom had been Labour allies of Sheppard's municipally).

=== Municipal politics ===
Rice Sheppard served a total of nearly twelve years on Edmonton City Council and ran in seventeen municipal elections (five for mayor and twelve for alderman). The first of these was the 1913 election, when he was elected to a two-year term as an alderman. He ran for re-election at the conclusion of this term, in the 1915 election, but was defeated, placing tenth of fourteen candidates. (Only five were being elected.) He then stayed out of municipal politics for four years.

With the advent of political parties at the local level in Edmonton, he aligned himself with the Labour party, against the business-oriented Citizens' Committee. In the 1919 election, Sheppard made a return to aldermanic office, finishing third of twelve candidates. Labour's Joseph Clarke, took the mayoralty. Labour also won three of the five available aldermanic seats, and already held two seats on council (continuing from previous year). (With Sheppard's support, Labour thus held a majority of seats on council in 1919.

Sheppard did not seek re-election at the conclusion of this term in December 1921, but was elected in 1922, finishing second of sixteen candidates. (Six were being elected.) He and Dan Knott were the only Labour councillors elected this election. The Citizens' Committee (now renamed the Citizens' League) took most of the other available seats.

Rather than seek re-election as an alderman in the 1924 election, Sheppard challenged mayor Kenny Blatchford's re-election attempt. Sheppard was defeated in the two person race, taking just under forty percent of the vote. He tried again in the following year, this time taking less than ten percent of the vote and coming in fourth place out of six. The mayoral contest was held using instant-runoff voting but Blatchford won a majority of votes on the first round of counting, a fourth-place finish of six candidates, behind Joseph Clarke.

Blatchford didn't seek re-election in 1926, and Sheppard again ran for mayor. Labour selected Dan Knott to be its candidate, and Sheppard ran as an independent. Sheppard came in last in a six-person field in the first count. Under the rules of Instant-runoff voting, votes were transferred as no one received a majority of votes in the first round of counting. Sheppard was the first to be eliminated. Transfers eventually produced a majority winner, former Conservative MP Ambrose Bury.

In 1928 Sheppard ran for one of the six aldermanic seats available. He did not receive a nomination from Labour, so ran as an Independent Labour candidate. He finished fifth of fourteen candidates - ahead of two of the Labour Party candidates - and was elected to a one-year term. As an elected member, he was welcomed back into the Labour fold. He was re-elected as part of that slate in the 1929 election (when he finished fifth of fifteen candidates), the 1931 election (when he finished first of fifteen candidates), and the 1933 election (when he finished first of seventeen candidates).

Sheppard broke with Labour in 1934 when he ran as an independent against incumbent Labour mayor Knott. Knott was defeated by Joe Clarke (running as an Independent Labour candidate); Sheppard finished a distant fourth of five candidates.

1935 saw a reconfiguration of Edmonton's political parties. What had hitherto been a competition between Labour and the Citizens' Committee (the latter under a variety of names) became a multi-party system. Clarke was re-elected in the 1935 election as a Civic Youth Association candidate, and three of the five aldermanic seats went to candidates running under the Social Credit label. A new left-leaning party, the United People's League, had replaced the Labour party the following year. Sheppard ran in the 1936 election as a Social Credit candidate, but he finished sixth of sixteen aldermanic candidates as the Citizens' Committee swept the five available seats; this was the first time since 1915 that Sheppard had been defeated in an aldermanic race. It would not be the last, as unsuccessful bids followed in 1940 (when he ran as a member of the newly formed Civic Progressive Association and finished tenth of nineteen candidates, only seven being elected) and 1941 (when he ran as an independent and finished last of fourteen candidates, only five being elected).

In 1944, Sheppard was the sole challenger to incumbent mayor John Wesley Fry. Sheppard received less than thirty percent of the vote.

He made a final bid for election in the 1945 election, when he was in his 80s. Running as an Independent aldermanic candidate, he finished twelfth of fourteen candidates, only five being elected.

=== Federal politics ===
In the 1921 federal election, Sheppard put his name forward to be the UFA's candidate in the riding of Strathcona, but was not chosen. He then ran as a Labour candidate in that riding. He finished last of three candidates, as Progressive Party of Canada/UFA candidate Daniel Webster Warner was elected.
