= 1939 Edmonton municipal election =

Municipal election in Alberta, Canada

The 1939 municipal election was held November 8, 1939 to elect a mayor and five aldermen to sit on Edmonton City Council. Elections for school trustees were not held, as candidates for both the public and separate boards were acclaimed.

There were ten aldermen on city council, but five of the positions were already filled: Hugh MacDonald, Mack McColl, James Ogilvie, Sidney Parsons, and Blair Paterson (SS) were all elected to two-year terms in 1938 and were still in office.

There were seven trustees on the public school board, but two of the positions were already filled: Izena Ross and W G McConachie had been elected to two-year terms in 1938 and were still in office. Armour Ford had also been elected to a two-year term in 1938, but had resigned; accordingly, Sidney Bowcott was acclaimed to a one-year term by virtue of being the last candidate to have submitted his nomination. On the separate board, there were four vacancies out of seven positions, as Adrian Crowe (SS), James O'Hara, and J O Pilon were continuing.

== Voter turnout ==
There were 11,470 ballots cast out of 55,388 eligible voters, for a voter turnout of 20.7%.

== Results ==
- bold or ✓ indicates elected
- italics indicate incumbent
- "SS", where data is available, indicates representative for Edmonton's South Side, with a minimum South Side representation instituted after the city of Strathcona, south of the North Saskatchewan River, amalgamated into Edmonton on February 1, 1912.

=== Mayor ===
| Party | Candidate | Votes | % |
|---|---|---|---|
| Citizens' Committee | John Wesley Fry | 9,199 | 80.88% |
| Independent Progressive Association | Samuel Barnes | 2,174 | 19.12% |

=== Aldermen ===
| Party | Candidate | Votes | | Elected |
|---|---|---|---|---|
| Citizens' Committee | George Campbell | 9,138 | SS | ✓ |
| Citizens' Committee | Edward Brown | 9,002 | | ✓ |
| Citizens' Committee | Frederick Casselman | 8,638 | | ✓ |
| Citizens' Committee | Douglas Grout | 8,468 | SS | ✓ |
| Citizens' Committee | Dan Knott | 8,296 | | ✓ |
| Independent | Joseph Clarke | 4,364 | | |
| Independent Progressive Association | Isabel Ringwood | 3,130 | | |

=== Public school trustees ===
M Downey (SS), Albert Ottewell (SS), Bruce Smith, R L Sutherland, and Sidney Bowcott were acclaimed.

=== Separate (Catholic) school trustees ===
Romeo Bouchard, Hugh Currie, Robert Tighe, and William Wilde (SS) were acclaimed.
