= 1937 Edmonton municipal election =

Municipal election in Alberta, Canada

The 1937 municipal election was held November 10, 1937, to elect a mayor and six aldermen to sit on Edmonton City Council and five trustees to sit on the public school board, while four trustees were acclaimed to the separate school board. Voters also decided three plebiscite questions.

There were ten aldermen on city council, but four of the positions were already filled: Hugh MacDonald, James Ogilvie, John McCreath, and Athelstan Bissett (representing the South Side) had been elected to two-year terms in 1936 and were still in office. John Wesley Fry had also been elected to a two-year term in 1936, but he resigned to run for mayor; accordingly, Blair Paterson (SS), who polled sixth in this election, was elected to a one-year term to finish off his term.

There were seven trustees on the public school board, but two of the positions were already filled: Izena Ross and Armour Ford had been elected to two-year terms in 1936 and were still in office. Frederick Casselman had also been elected to a two-year term in 1936, but had resigned; accordingly, George Gleave was elected to a one-year term. On the separate school board there were four vacancies, as A J Crowe (SS), J O Pilon, and J O'Hara were continuing.

== Voter turnout ==
There were 24,279 ballots cast out of 51,599 eligible voters, for a voter turnout of 47%.

== Results ==
- bold or ✓ indicates elected
- italics indicate incumbent
- "SS", where data is available, indicates representative for Edmonton's South Side, with a minimum South Side representation instituted after the city of Strathcona, south of the North Saskatchewan River, amalgamated into Edmonton on February 1, 1912.

=== Mayor ===
Party	Candidate	Votes	%
Citizens' Committee	John Wesley Fry	10,487	43.63%
Edmonton First	Joseph Clarke	7,340	30.53%
Progressive Civic Association	Guy Patterson	3,419	14.22%
Independent	John Sedgewick Cowper	2,730	11.36%
Independent	Frederick Speed	62	0.26%

=== Aldermen ===
Party	Candidate	Votes		Elected
Citizens' Committee	Edward Brown	12,677		✓
Citizens' Committee	Frederick Casselman	12,386		✓
Citizens' Committee	Douglas Grout	12,252	SS	✓
Citizens' Committee	George Campbell	11,709		✓
Citizens' Committee	Dan Knott	11,655		✓
Citizens' Committee	Blair Paterson	10,980	SS	✓
Progressive Civic Association	Harry Ainlay	10,103	SS	
Progressive Civic Association	James Findlay	8,501		
Independent	Margaret Crang	7,608	SS	
Progressive Civic Association	Charles Gould	7,190	SS	
Progressive Civic Association	Elisha East	5,323		
Independent	Walter Clevely	4,884		
Progressive Civic Association	William Miller	4,551		
Progressive Civic Association	Charles Lee	4,447		
Independent	Raymond C. Ghostley	2,308		
New Deal	John James Allen	2,036		
Independent	Peter Glassman	1,779		
Independent	Ernest Holub	1,072		
Independent	Charles Keily	734		

=== Public school trustees ===
Party	Candidate	Votes		Elected
Citizens' Committee	Albert Ottewell	10,297	SS	✓
Citizens' Committee	Walter Morrish	8,829		✓
Progressive Civic Association	Sidney Bowcott	8,391		✓
Citizens' Committee	C. Bruce Smith	7,330		✓
Citizens' Committee	George Gleave	7,034		✓
Independent	Frank Crang	6,770	SS	
Progressive Civic Association	Mary Ann Gilchrist	5,950		
Progressive Civic Association	Adam Bruce	5,384		
Progressive Civic Association	Thomas Housley	3,959		

=== Separate (Catholic) school trustees ===
Hugh Currie, Charles Gariepy, John Whelihan and William Wilde (SS) were acclaimed.

=== Plebiscites ===
==== Mayoral Elections ====
Are you in favour of the Mayor being elected annually by the members of the City Council from their number?

- Yes - 4,444
- No - 18,383

==== Airport Hangar ====
$35,000 for an Airport Hangar

- Yes - 5,308
- No - 1,578

==== Police Signals ====
$25,000 for Police Signals

- Yes - 3,075
- No - 3,159
