= 1943 Edmonton municipal election =

Municipal election in Alberta, Canada

The 1943 municipal election was held November 10, 1943 to elect a mayor and five aldermen to sit on Edmonton City Council and four trustees to sit on the public school board, while four trustees were acclaimed to the separate school board.

There were ten aldermen on city council, but five of the positions were already filled: Athelstan Bissett (SS), Sidney Bowcott, Frederick John Mitchell, James Ogilvie, and Sidney Parsons were all elected to two-year terms in 1942 and were still in office.

There were seven trustees on the public school board, but three of the positions were already filled: Izena Ross, William McConachie, and Alex Gemeroy had been elected to two-year terms in 1942 and were still in office. The same was true of the separate board, where Adrien Crowe (SS), Francis Killeen, and James O'Hara were continuing.

== Voter turnout ==
There were 10,442 ballots cast out of 58,406 eligible voters, for a voter turnout of 17.8%.

== Results ==
- bold or ✓ indicates elected
- italics indicate incumbent
- "SS", where data is available, indicates representative for Edmonton's South Side, with a minimum South Side representation instituted after the city of Strathcona, south of the North Saskatchewan River, amalgamated into Edmonton on February 1, 1912.

=== Mayor ===
| Party | Candidate | Votes | % |
|---|---|---|---|
| Independent | John Wesley Fry | 7,270 | 70.25% |
| Independent | Thomas Joseph Cairns | 3,079 | 29.75% |

=== Aldermen ===
| Party | Candidate | Votes | | Elected |
|---|---|---|---|---|
| Citizens' Committee | James McCrie Douglas | 5,684 | SS | ✓ |
| Co-operative Commonwealth Federation | Harry Ainlay | 5,216 | SS | ✓ |
| Citizens' Committee | Winslow Hamilton | 4,910 | | ✓ |
| Citizens' Committee | Charles Gariepy | 4,777 | | ✓ |
| Citizens' Committee | Melvin Downey | 4,699 | SS | ✓ |
| Civic Progressive Association | Gwendolen Clarke | 4,438 | | |
| Citizens' Committee | Verna Arthur Porter | 4,424 | | |
| Civic Progressive Association | Guy Patterson | 3,809 | | |
| Co-operative Commonwealth Federation | Joseph Herbert Dowler | 3,309 | | |
| Co-operative Commonwealth Federation | Alfred Paramour Gregory | 2,962 | | |
| Labor–Progressive | William Lambert Careless | 1,836 | | |
| Civic Progressive Association | John Guild | 1,496 | | |

=== Public school trustees ===
| Party | Candidate | Votes | | Elected |
|---|---|---|---|---|
| Citizens' Committee | Albert Ottewell | 6,466 | SS | ✓ |
| Citizens' Committee | Bertram F. Robertson | 4,875 | | ✓ |
| Citizens' Committee | Frank Jost Newson | 4,958 | | ✓ |
| Citizens' Committee | Roy Leonard Sutherland | 4,770 | | ✓ |
| Co-operative Commonwealth Federation | Mary Butterworth | 4,380 | SS | |
| Co-operative Commonwealth Federation | William Henry Thornton | 3,911 | | |
| Civic Progressive Association | Wellesley Fraser | 2,953 | | |

=== Separate (Catholic) school trustees ===
William Wilde (SS), Joseph Gallant, Thomas Malone, and J O Pilon were acclaimed.
