= 1945 Edmonton municipal election =

Canadian municipal election

The 1945 municipal election was held November 7, 1945 to elect a mayor and five aldermen to sit on Edmonton City Council and five trustees to sit on the public school board, while four trustees were acclaimed to the separate school board.

There were ten aldermen on city council, but five of the positions were already filled: Sidney Bowcott, Athelstan Bissett (SS), Sidney Parsons, James Ogilvie, Frederick John Mitchell were all elected to two-year terms in 1944 and were still in office.

There were seven trustees on the public school board, but two of the positions were already filled: George Cormie and Alex Gemeroy had been elected to two-year terms in 1944 and were still in office. Izena Ross had also been elected to a two-year term in 1944, but had resigned; accordingly, James MacDonald was elected to a one-year term.

On the separate board, there were four vacancies out of seven seats, as Adrian Crowe (SS), Francis Killeen, and James O'Hara were continuing.

== Voter turnout ==
There were 19,600 ballots cast out of 69,730 eligible voters, for a voter turnout of 28.0%.

== Results ==
- bold or ✓ indicates elected
- italics indicate incumbent
- "SS", where data is available, indicates representative for Edmonton's South Side, with a minimum South Side representation instituted after the city of Strathcona, south of the North Saskatchewan River, amalgamated into Edmonton on February 1, 1912.

=== Mayor ===
Party	Candidate	Votes	%
Civic Democratic Alliance	Harry Ainlay	10,690	54.74%
Citizens' Committee	Winslow Hamilton	8,840	45.26%

=== Aldermen ===
Party	Candidate	Votes		Elected
Citizens' Committee	James McCrie Douglas	9,343	SS	✓
Civic Democratic Alliance	Ethel Browne	9,074	SS	✓
Citizens' Committee	John Munro	8,570		✓
Civic Democratic Alliance	John Gillies	8,553		✓
Citizens' Committee	Charles Gariepy	8,532		✓
Civic Democratic Alliance	Joseph Dowler	8,384		
Citizens' Committee	E. B. Wilson	8,282		
Citizens' Committee	Percy Gwynne	7,942		
Civic Democratic Alliance	Peter Collins	7,814		
Civic Democratic Alliance	J. H. King	7,370		
Independent	Lawrie	2,996		
Independent	Rice Sheppard	2,062	SS	
Independent Labour	W. H. O'Neill	1,646		
Independent	Julia Kiniski	1,305		

=== Public school trustees ===
Party	Candidate	Votes		Elected
Citizens' Committee	Albert Ottewell	9,262	SS	✓
Citizens' Committee	Armour Ford	9,100		✓
Citizens' Committee	Mary Butterworth	9,090	SS	✓
Civic Democratic Alliance	E. S. Haynes	8,491		✓
Citizens' Committee	James MacDonald	8,265		✓
Citizens' Committee	Frank J. Newson	8,174		
Civic Democratic Alliance	R. L. M. Hart	7,864		
Civic Democratic Alliance	D. Milner	7,567		
Civic Democratic Alliance	R. J. Boutilier	6,389		
Civic Democratic Alliance	J. W. Badowski	6,361		

=== Separate (Catholic) school trustees ===
Joseph Gallant, Thomas Malone, J O Pilon, and William Wilde (SS) were acclaimed.
