= 1935 Edmonton municipal election =

Municipal election in Alberta, Canada

The 1935 municipal election was held November 13, 1935 to elect a mayor and five aldermen to sit on Edmonton City Council and four trustees to sit on the public school board, while four trustees were acclaimed to the separate school board. Voters also approved a requirement that candidates for city council be required to own property.

There were ten aldermen on city council, but five of the positions were already filled: Hugh MacDonald, John Wesley Fry, Dick Foote, John McCreath, and James East were all elected to two-year terms in 1934 and were still in office.

This election saw emergence of two new civic political parties. Candidates for the first time ran in an Edmonton municipal election under the Social Credit label, excited after winning majority government in the 1935 provincial election. The Tax Reform League, an anti-Social Credit organization, also ran candidates. carrying on the anti-tax work that the Civic Government Association had conducted in previous elections.

There were seven trustees on the public school board, but three of the positions were already filled: Samuel Barnes, Frederick Casselman, and Izena Ross had all been elected to two-year terms in 1934 and were still in office. The same was true of the separate school board, where A J Crowe (SS), J O Pilon, and J O'Hara were continuing.

== Electoral system ==
Election of mayor and other single members conducted using First past the post.

Election of aldermen and schoolboard trustees conducted using Plurality block voting.

== Voter turnout ==
There were 19,984 voters voting out of 48,003 eligible voters, for a voter turnout of 41.6%.

== Results ==
- bold or ✓ indicates elected
- italics indicate incumbent
- "SS", where data is available, indicates representative for Edmonton's South Side, with a minimum South Side representation instituted after the city of Strathcona, south of the North Saskatchewan River, amalgamated into Edmonton on February 1, 1912.

=== Mayor ===
Party	Candidate	Votes	%
Canadian Youth Association	Joseph Clarke	11,120	56.06%
Tax Reform League	Ralph Bellamy	6,313	31.83%
Independent	Morris Baker	2,330	11.75%
Independent	Frederick Speed	73	0.37%

=== Aldermen ===
Party	Candidate	Votes		Elected
Labour	Margaret Crang	11,226	SS	✓
Social Credit	Elisha East	8,798		✓
Social Credit	Guy Patterson	8,409		✓
Canadian Youth Association	Walter Clevely	7,410		✓
Social Credit	Charles Gould	7,378	SS	✓
Tax Reform League	Athelstan Bissett	7,095	SS	
Labour	Harry Ainlay	6,848	SS	
Tax Reform League	Ernest Edward Howard	6,717		
Tax Reform League	George Patterson Ponton	6,403		
Tax Reform League	John Henry Warren	5,918		
Labour	James Findlay	5,598		
Labour	William Henry Miller	2,832		
Independent	Raymond C. Ghostley	1,226		
Independent	Charles Martin Keily	683		

=== Public school trustees ===
Party	Candidate	Votes		Elected
Tax Reform League	Walter Morrish	11,093		✓
Labour	Frank Crang	9,347	SS	✓
Independent	Albert Ottewell	8,745	SS	✓
Labour	Sidney Bowcott	8,566		✓
Tax Reform League	Armour Ford	7,039		
Social Credit	Mary Ann Gilchrist	6,009		
Social Credit	Adam Bruce	5,910		

=== Separate (Catholic) school trustees ===
Charles Gariepy, Thomas Malone, R D Tighe, and William Wilde (SS) were acclaimed.

=== Property Qualification Plebiscite ===
Shall a candidate for Mayor or Alderman be required to have a property qualification?

- Yes - 14,478
- No - 4,202
