= 1941 Edmonton municipal election =

Municipal election in Alberta, Canada

The 1941 municipal election was held November 12, 1941 to elect a mayor and five aldermen to sit on Edmonton City Council and four trustees to sit on the public school board, while four trustees were acclaimed to the separate school board.

There were ten aldermen on city council, but five of the positions were already filled: James Ogilvie, Sidney Bowcott, Athelstan Bissett (SS), Sidney Parsons, and Frederick John Mitchell were all elected to two-year terms in 1940 and were still in office.

There were seven trustees on the public school board, but three of the positions were already filled: Izena Ross, E M Gunderson, and W G McConachie had been acclaimed to two-year terms in 1940 and were still in office. The same was true of the separate board, where Adrien Crowe (SS), James O’Hara, and J O Pilon were continuing.

The seats were contested by the powerful business-oriented Citizens' Committee, the Labour Party/CCF and the Civic Progressive Association, a United front of leftist groups that had been formed the previous year.

== Voter turnout ==
There were 17,566 ballots cast out of 56,808 eligible voters, for a voter turnout of 30.9%.

== Results ==
- bold or ✓ indicates elected
- italics indicate incumbent
- "SS", where data is available, indicates representative for Edmonton's South Side, with a minimum South Side representation instituted after the city of Strathcona, south of the North Saskatchewan River, amalgamated into Edmonton on February 1, 1912.

=== Mayor ===
Party	Candidate	Votes	%
Independent	John Wesley Fry	11,632	68.78%
Citizens' Committee	George Campbell	5,281	31.22%

=== Aldermen ===
Party	Candidate	Votes		Elected
Labour Party	Harry Ainlay	9,134	SS	✓
Citizens' Committee	James McCrie Douglas	8,113	SS	✓
Civic Progressive Association	Gwendolen Clarke	7,369		✓
Citizens' Committee	Charles Gariepy	6,718		✓
Civic Progressive Association	Guy Patterson	6,378		✓
Civic Progressive Association	Margaret Crang	6,082	SS	
Independent	Dan Knott	6,070		
Citizens' Committee	John E. Sydie	5,251		
Citizens' Committee	Milo M. Case	4,921		
Citizens' Committee	Albert E. Knowler	4,485		
Independent	Joseph Adair	4,148		
Independent	Mack McColl	4,053		
Labour Party	W. H. O'Neill	3,928		
Independent	Rice Sheppard	3,691	SS	

=== Public school trustees ===
Party	Candidate	Votes		Elected
Citizens' Committee	Melvin Downey	10,993	SS	✓
Citizens' Committee	Roy Sutherland	10,794		✓
Citizens' Committee	Albert Ottewell	10,532	SS	✓
Citizens' Committee	James Hyndman	10,532		✓
Labour	William Tree	6,604		

=== Separate (Catholic) school trustees ===
William Wilde (SS), Robert Tighe, Thomas Malone, and Romeo Bouchard were acclaimed.
