= 1936 Edmonton municipal election =

Municipal election in Alberta, Canada

The 1936 municipal election was held November 12, 1936 to elect a mayor and five aldermen to sit on Edmonton City Council and three trustees to sit on the public school board, while three trustees were acclaimed to the separate school board. Voters also rejected a proposal to extend the mayor's term to two years. The election would normally have been held on November 11 (the rule at the time being that the municipal election would be held on the second Wednesday of November), but was delayed by a day owing to the Armistice Day holiday.

There were ten aldermen on city council, but five of the positions were already filled: Margaret Crang (SS), Elisha East, Guy Patterson, Walter Clevely, and Charles Gould (SS) were all elected to two-year terms in 1935 and were still in office.

There were seven trustees on the public school board, but four of the positions were already filled: Walter Morrish, Frank Crang (SS), Albert Ottewell (SS), and Sidney Bowcott had all been elected to two-year terms in 1935 and were still in office. The same was true of the separate school board, where Charles Gariepy, Thomas Malone, R D Tighe, and William Wilde (SS) were continuing.

== Voter turnout ==
There were 29,300 ballots cast out of 50,670 eligible voters, for a voter turnout of 57.8%.

== Results ==
- bold or ✓ indicates elected
- italics indicate incumbent
- "SS", where data is available, indicates representative for Edmonton's South Side, with a minimum South Side representation instituted after the city of Strathcona, south of the North Saskatchewan River, amalgamated into Edmonton on February 1, 1912.

=== Mayor ===
| Party | Candidate | Votes | % |
|---|---|---|---|
| Civic Youth Association | Joseph Clarke | 12,992 | 44.72% |
| Citizens' Committee | James McCrie Douglas | 12,417 | 42.74% |
| United People's League | Harry Dean Ainlay | 3,403 | 11.71% |
| Independent | Dick Foote | 184 | 0.63% |
| Independent | Frederick Speed | 54 | 0.19% |

=== Aldermen ===
| Party | Candidate | Votes | | Elected |
|---|---|---|---|---|
| Citizens' Committee | Hugh MacDonald | 14,264 | | ✓ |
| Citizens' Committee | John Wesley Fry | 13,094 | | ✓ |
| Citizens' Committee | James Ogilvie | 12,787 | | ✓ |
| Citizens' Committee | John McCreath | 12,054 | | ✓ |
| Citizens' Committee | Athelstan Bissett | 11,978 | SS | ✓ |
| Social Credit | Rice Sheppard | 11,612 | SS | |
| Social Credit | Daniel Powers | 10,246 | | |
| Social Credit | W. P. Bullock | 9,549 | | |
| Independent | George O'Leary | 8,414 | | |
| Civic Youth Association | Ernest Edward Howard | 7,323 | | |
| United People's League | James East | 5,850 | | |
| United People's League | James Findlay | 5,134 | | |
| Independent | Dan Knott | 3,939 | | |
| Independent | Joseph Adair | 3,474 | | |
| United People's League | Herbert John Pallot | 3,011 | | |
| Independent | Charles Martin Keily | 727 | | |

=== Public school trustees ===
| Party | Candidate | Votes | Elected |
|---|---|---|---|
| Citizens' Committee | Frederick Casselman | 14,301 | ✓ |
| Citizens' Committee | Izena Ross | 13,974 | ✓ |
| Citizens' Committee | Armour Ford | 13,102 | ✓ |
| Social Credit | A. D. Bruce | 9,452 | |
| Social Credit | Mary Ann Gilchrist | 9,202 | |
| United People's League | A. Richardson | 4,706 | |
| United People's League | Hugh Critchlow | 2,858 | |

=== Separate (Catholic) school trustees ===
Adrien Crowe (SS), J O Pilon, and J O'Hara were acclaimed.

=== Mayoral Term Plebiscite ===
Are you in favour of the Mayor holding office for the term of two years?

- Yes - 12,511
- No - 15,320
