= 1926 Edmonton municipal election =

Municipal election in Alberta, Canada

The 1926 municipal election was held December 13, 1926, to elect a mayor and six aldermen to sit on Edmonton City Council and three trustees to sit on the public school board. Harry Carrigan, J O Pilon, and W D Trainor were acclaimed to two-year terms on the separate school board.

There were ten aldermen on city council, but four of the positions were already filled: James East, James Findlay, Frederick Keillor (SS), and A C Sloane were all elected to two-year terms in 1925 and were still in office. James McCrie Douglas (SS) had also been elected in 1925, but had resigned to run for mayor halfway through his two-year term. Accordingly, L S C Dineen, the elected councillor with the fewest votes, was named to a one-year term to fill Douglas's seat.

There were seven trustees on the public school board, but four of the positions were already filled: Ralph Bellamy, Frank Crang (SS), F S MacPherson, and Elmer Roper had all been elected to two-year terms in 1925 and were still in office. The same was true on the separate board, where R Crossland (SS), Charles Gariepy, Thomas Magee, and A J Ryan were continuing.

The election of mayor was conducted using Alternative Voting; the election of councillors and school trustees was conducted using the single transferable vote system.

== Voter turnout ==
There were 12720 ballots cast out of 35726 eligible voters, for a voter turnout of 35.6%.

== Results ==
- bold or ✓ indicates elected
- italics indicate incumbent
- "SS", where data is available, indicates representative for Edmonton's South Side, with a minimum South Side representation instituted after the city of Strathcona, south of the North Saskatchewan River, amalgamated into Edmonton on February 1, 1912.

=== Mayor ===
Party	Candidate	Initial Votes	%
Independent	Ambrose Bury	4,816	37.94%
Labour	Dan Knott	2,944	23.19%
Civic Government Association	Will Werner	2,388	18.81%
Independent	Joseph Clarke	1,727	13.61%
Independent	James McCrie Douglas	571	4.50%
Independent	Rice Sheppard	247	1.95%

The mayoral election was conducted using Instant-runoff voting. No candidate had a majority of votes in the first count so the lowest-ranking candidates were eliminated and their votes were transferred based on back-up preferences marked by voters. Bury accumulated a majority of votes eventually and was declared the winner in the end.

=== Aldermen ===
Total valid votes 12,291. Six seats to fill. Quota (the number of votes that guarantees election): 1755 One southside candidate (ss) must be elected, even if none has quota.

Party	Candidate	Initial Votes	Elected
Labour	Charles Gibbs	2,107	✓
Labour	Alfred Farmilo	1,510	✓
Independent	Charles Robson	1,458	✓
Civic Government Association	Herbert Baker	1,287	✓
Civic Government Association	Robert Dolphin Tighe	1,107	
Civic Government Association	George Hazlett	1,009	✓
Civic Government Association	Robert Muir	980	
Civic Government Association	Charles Henry Grant	840	
Civic Government Association	Norman Currie Willson	657	
Labour	Lionel Shurley Crawford Dineen (ss)	555	✓
Labour	Edward James Thompson	402	
Labour	Edwin Evart Owen	379	

Because of the single transferable vote system, although Tighe received more initial votes than Hazlitt (although not enough to capture a seat), he was not elected while initially-less-popular Hazlitt was. Hazlitt passed Tighe's vote total due to votes transferred from other candidates.

Dineen was declared elected due to the southside guarantee.

The city clerk's conducting of this STV/PR vote was criticized and the next year the city held a plebiscite on whether to continue using the STV/PR system.

=== Public school trustees ===
Party	Candidate	Votes		Elected
Labour	Samuel Barnes	3,741		✓
Civic Government Association	Thyrza Bishop	2,506		✓
Civic Government Association	D. B. Lake	1,710		
Civic Government Association	W. W. McBain (ss)	1,528		
Labour	J A Herlihy (ss)	1,127	SS	✓
Labour	G. Teviotdale	480		

Under the minimum South Side representation rule, Herlihy was elected over Lake and McBain. Later McBain challenged Herlihy's election, saying Lake's votes should have been transferred before the last seat was allocated, and was given the school board seat.

=== Separate (Catholic) school trustees ===
Harry Carrigan, J O Pilon, and W D Trainor were acclaimed.
