= 1942 Edmonton municipal election =

Municipal election in Alberta, Canada

The 1942 municipal election was held November 12, 1942 to elect a mayor and five aldermen to sit on Edmonton City Council, three trustees to sit on the public school board and five trustees to sit on the separate school board. Voters also approved an eight-hour day for firefighters. The election would normally have been held on November 11 (the rule at the time being that the municipal election would be held on the second Wednesday of November), but was delayed by a day owing to the Armistice Day holiday.

There were ten aldermen on city council, but five of the positions were already filled: Harry Ainlay (SS), James McCrie Douglas (SS), Gwendolen Clarke, Charles Gariepy, Guy Patterson were all elected to two-year terms in 1941 and were still in office.

There were seven trustees on the public school board, but four of the positions were already filled: Melvin Downey (SS), Roy Sutherland, Albert Ottewell (SS), and James Hyndman had been elected to two-year terms in 1941 and were still in office. On the separate board, two of the seven seats were occupied: Thomas Malone and William Wilde (SS) had been elected in 1941 and were still in office. Robert Tighe and Romeo Bouchard had also been elected in 1941, but Tighe had died and Bouchard had resigned. Accordingly, Joseph Gallant and J O Pilon were elected to one-year terms.

== Voter turnout ==
There were 8,208 ballots cast out of 57,889 eligible voters, for a voter turnout of 14.2%.

== Results ==
- bold or ✓ indicates elected
- italics indicate incumbent
- "SS", where data is available, indicates representative for Edmonton's South Side, with a minimum South Side representation instituted after the city of Strathcona, south of the North Saskatchewan River, amalgamated into Edmonton on February 1, 1912.

=== Mayor ===
John Wesley Fry was acclaimed to a sixth term as mayor.

=== Aldermen ===
Party	Candidate	Votes		Elected
Citizens' Committee	Sidney Bowcott	4,698		✓
Citizens' Committee	Athelstan Bissett	4,645	SS	✓
Citizens' Committee	Sidney Parsons	4,458		✓
Citizens' Committee	James Ogilvie	4,306		✓
Citizens' Committee	Frederick John Mitchell	3,721		✓
Civic Progressive Association	Charles Willis	2,876		
Co-operative Commonwealth Federation / Farmer / Labour	William H. Miller	2,783		
Civic Progressive Association	Adam McKay	2,750		
Co-operative Commonwealth Federation / Farmer / Labour	Joseph Dowler	2,601		
Civic Progressive Association	Isabel Ringwood	2,597		
Independent	Anthony Shute	2,107		
Independent	Peter Glassman	788		

=== Public school trustees ===
Party	Candidate	Votes	Elected
Citizens' Committee	Izena Ross	4,150	✓
Citizens' Committee	William McConachie	4,010	✓
Citizens' Committee	G. Alex Gemeroy	3,390	✓
Civic Progressive Association	Alfred Marks	2,965	
Co-operative Commonwealth Federation / Farmer / Labour	Edith Rogers	2,869	
Co-operative Commonwealth Federation / Farmer / Labour	William Tree	2,606	

=== Separate (Catholic) school trustees ===
Candidate	Votes		Elected
Francis Killeen	733		✓
James O'Hara	716		✓
Adrien Crowe	698	SS	✓
Joseph Gallant	698		✓
J O Pilon	679		✓
John McLean	616		

=== Firefighter Work Hours Plebiscite ===
Do you approve of Bylaw No. 1019, establishing an eight-hour day for the members of the Edmonton Fire Department, to commence within one year next following the cessation of hostilities in the present war?

- Yes - 5,818
- No - 2,262
