= Kisêwâtisiwin School =

kisêwâtisiwin School

Location
- 1434-80 Street; Edmonton, Alberta; Canada; 53.445°N 113.453°W

Information
- Former name: Dan Knott Junior High
- School type: Public
- School board: Edmonton Public Schools
- Principal: Clinton Preeper
- Grades: 7-9
- Enrollment: 500+
- Language: English
- Team name: kisêwâtisiwin Wolves
- Budget: $3,251,426 (2021)

kisêwâtisiwin School is a junior high school in Edmonton, Alberta, Canada, located in the Knottwood community.

In 2006, Today's Parent named the school one of the top 40 elementary and junior high schools in Canada.

== Name ==
kisêwâtisiwin School was formerly named after former Edmonton mayor Dan Knott. In 2017, Edmonton Public Schools promised to debate changing the school's name due to Dan Knott's association with the Alberta branch of the Ku Klux Klan.

In early September 2020, after a petition was put forward by a community member, the school board voted unanimously in favour of a motion that "recommended the school division seek input from the community" before renaming the school. In May 2022, it was announced that the school would be renamed to kisêwâtisiwin, a Cree term meaning kindness or the act of being kind. The new name took effect at the beginning of the 2022–23 school year.

== Athletics ==
kisêwâtisiwin School is also well known for its athletics program. The following teams were, or have been active at kisêwâtisiwin:

- Sr. Boys & Sr. Girls Volleyball
- Boys & Girls Indoor Soccer
- Sr. and Jr. Badminton
- Jr. Boys & Jr. Girls Volleyball
- Sr. Boys & Jr. Boys Basketball
- Sr. Girls & Jr. Girls Basketball
- Track Team
- Flag Rugby
- Cheer
