= Joseph Clarke (Canadian politician) =

Canadian politician and lawyer

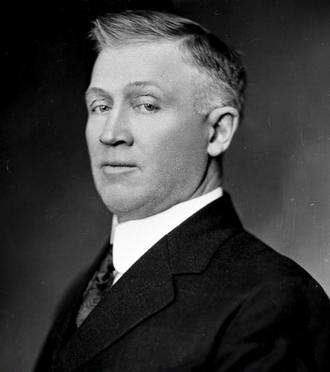

15th Mayor of Edmonton
- In office December 9, 1918 – December 13, 1920
- Preceded by: Harry Marshall Erskine Evans
- Succeeded by: David Milwyn Duggan
- In office November 14, 1934 – November 10, 1937
- Preceded by: Daniel Kennedy Knott
- Succeeded by: John Wesley Fry

Alderman on Edmonton City Council
- In office February 16, 1912 – December 9, 1912
- In office December 8, 1913 – December 13, 1915
- In office December 8, 1924 – December 14, 1925

Personal details
- Born: September 20, 1869 Osnabruck Center, Ontario
- Died: July 27, 1941 (aged 71) Edmonton, Alberta
- Party: Labour, Independent, Civic Youth Association
- Other political affiliations: Socialist Party of Alberta, Conservative Party of Canada, Liberal Party of Canada, People's Candidate
- Spouse: Gwendolen Asbury
- Children: Three
- Education: York University
- Profession: Lawyer

Joseph Andrew Clarke (September 20, 1869 – July 27, 1941) was a Canadian politician and lawyer. He served twice as mayor of Edmonton, Alberta, was a candidate for election to the House of Commons of Canada and the Legislative Assembly of Alberta, and was a member of the Yukon Territorial Council (precursor to the Yukon Legislative Assembly).

== Early life ==
Clarke was born in Osnabruck Center, Ontario. He was educated in Prescott and Brockville, Ontario, and joined the North-West Mounted Police in 1892 in Regina, Saskatchewan. He returned to Ontario shortly thereafter, only to be charged by the RNWMP with desertion. He was fined one hundred dollars, but received no further sanction in part because the magistrate was his uncle.

After his brief policing career, Clarke studied law at Osgoode Hall in Toronto, Ontario. Upon graduating, he moved to the Yukon to take part in the Klondike gold rush. While there, he was admitted to the bar and spent two years (1903–1904) as an appointed member of the Yukon Territorial Council.

He moved to Edmonton to practice law in 1908. Once there, he married Gwendolen Asbury on October 9, 1911; the pair had three children.

== Edmonton politics ==
Joseph Clarke ran in a total of twenty-seven Edmonton municipal elections, more than any person before or since (as municipal elections in Edmonton now occur only every four years, this record is unlikely ever to be broken). In all, he ran for mayor seventeen times (winning five such elections) and for alderman ten times (being elected three times).

Clarke's first attempt at municipal office took place during the February 1912 election, when he ran for the position of alderman on Edmonton City Council. He was elected to a one-year term. Rather than seek re-election in the next election, he ran for mayor, finishing in last place in a three candidate field.

He returned to city council after being elected to a two-year term as an alderman in the 1913 election. During this council term, he forged a temporary alliance with mayor William McNamara against those who wanted to drive prostitution and gambling out of the city. The alliance disintegrated after the two came to blows in a council meeting. Clarke lost his re-election, bid, finishing eighth of fourteen candidates in the 1915 election. Unsuccessful bids for mayor followed in 1916 and 1917 before he was elected to that office in the 1918.

During his first term as mayor, Clarke was confronted with a citywide strike in support of the Winnipeg General Strike of 1919. Clarke was sympathetic to the strikers, and when the federal government's Royal Commission on Industrial Relations (the Mather Commission) stopped in Edmonton, he joined labour leaders in presenting a list of twenty-nine demands, including the right to collective bargaining, the eight-hour day, price controls, and workers' rights to run and hold public office. He also resisted the use of strikebreakers (despite strong advocacy from the Edmonton Board of Trade and alderman Charles Grant), for which he was accused by the Edmonton Journal and Edmonton Bulletin of succumbing to the "Soviet power" of the Edmonton Trade & Labour Council (ET&LC). Instead, he and alderman J. A. Kinney negotiated with the ET&LC's strike committee (which included future city mayors Elmer Ernest Roper and Daniel Kennedy Knott and future alderman Alfred Farmilo) to allow the continued provision of certain services.

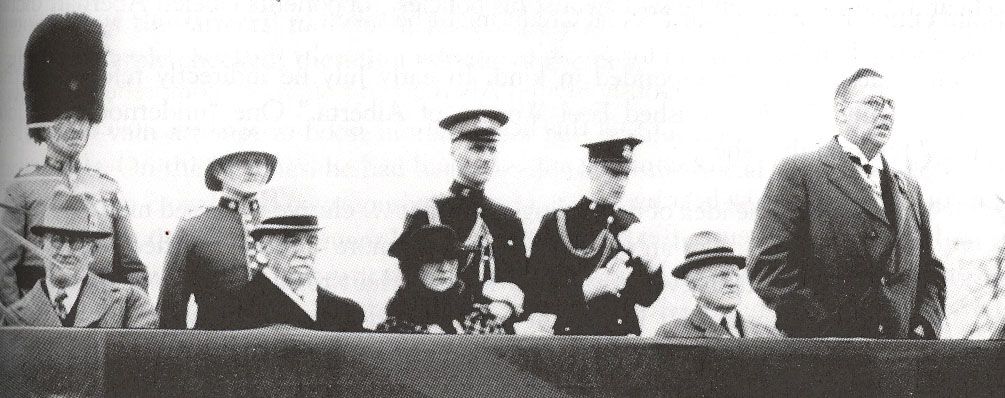
Clarke, seated at left, on the occasion of George V's silver jubilee

Clarke was re-elected mayor in the 1919 election, but a concerted effort by the Board of Trade and the two local papers saw him defeated by David Duggan in the 1920 election. His attempt to regain his old job in the 1922 election failed, as he finished second of six candidates. He was elected again as an alderman in the 1924 election for a two-year term, but resigned after one year in order to run for mayor in the 1925 election. He finished third of six candidates.

There followed a decade in the political wilderness, marked by unsuccessful runs for mayor (in 1926, 1927, 1932, and 1933) and alderman (in 1928, 1929, 1930, and 1931), before he was returned to the office of mayor in the 1934 election. While he had lost the office fourteen years earlier for being too friendly to organized labour, his opponents in 1934 included Knott and labour alderman Rice Sheppard. He was re-elected in 1935 and 1936 (defeating future mayor and labour advocate Harry Dean Ainlay on this second occasion). It was during this term that he laid the groundwork for a football stadium on the site of a closed federal prison. This stadium was eventually named Clarke Stadium in his honour.

Joseph Clarke was defeated in the 1937 election by John Wesley Fry. He ran in every municipal election until the end of his life (for mayor in 1938 and for alderman in 1939 and 1940) but never again held political office.

== Provincial politics ==
Joseph Clarke was a perennial candidate for the Legislative Assembly of Alberta, running provincially five times.

He first ran in the 1913 Alberta general election as a parachute candidate in the controversial Clearwater electoral district for Charles M. O'Brien's Socialist Party of Alberta. He was defeated by Liberal Henry William McKenney, the incumbent M.L.A. for Pembina.

Clarke next ran in the 1917 election as an independent in Edmonton East. He finished third of four candidates - the only candidate he defeated was Sydney Keeling, of Clarke's old Socialist Party.

He ran again in the 1926 Alberta general election as an independent Liberal in Edmonton district. He finished fourth of eighteen candidates on the first count, which would have been sufficient to win one of the riding's five seats under a plurality voting system; however, the district used a single transferable vote system that allowed more generally popular candidates to pass him on subsequent counts. One of the candidates to do so was David Duggan, the same businessman who had defeated Clarke in his mayoral re-election bid in 1920.

Clarke's fourth attempt at provincial office took place during the 1930 election, when he sought election in Edmonton as an independent. He finished sixteenth of seventeen candidates. He was thus eliminated early in the STV vote counting process.

Clarke's final provincial election was a 1937 by-election in Edmonton caused by the death of incumbent Liberal G.H. Van Allen. Clarke ran as a "People's Candidate" and was backed by the new Alberta Social Credit Party government, which did not field a candidate. He finished second, as Liberal leader Edward Leslie Gray retained the seat for his party, which was backed by the Conservatives under the so-called "Unity Movement". Clarke was mayor of Edmonton at the time of this by-election.

== Federal politics ==
Clarke was a perennial candidate in Federal elections, running unsuccessfully four times. He made his first bid for a seat in the Canadian House of Commons, running as a Conservative candidate in the a 1902 by-election in the Yukon electoral district. He was defeated by James Hamilton Ross. He made his second bid while still living in the Yukon in the 1908 federal election and was once again defeated, this time by Frederick Congdon.

Clarke did not make another run for federal office until 13 years later, when he ran in Edmonton East for the Liberal Party of Canada in the 1921 federal election (he was a personal friend of then-Liberal leader and soon to be Prime Minister William Lyon Mackenzie King). He finished second to Progressive candidate Donald Ferdinand Kellner. His final run for federal office was in Peace River again running for the Liberal Party of Canada in the 1926 Canadian federal election. He was defeated by Donald MacBeth Kennedy finishing third in a field of three candidates.

== Personal life, death, and legacy ==
Clarke was an accomplished athlete, and excelled at lacrosse, football, and track and field. He was also known for his penchant for violence, and was nicknamed "Fightin' Joe" as a result.

He was accused of involvement in prostitution and gambling rings, which tarnished his political career.

Joseph Andrew Clarke died in his sleep July 26, 1941, less than a year after contesting his last election.

Clarke Stadium and Joe Clarke Athletic Grounds were named in his honour.

His wife, Gwendolen, served on the Edmonton City Council from 1942 to 1943, after his death.

Political offices
Preceded by Harry Marshall Erskine Evans	Mayor of Edmonton; 1919–1920	Succeeded by David Milwyn Duggan
Preceded by Daniel Kennedy Knott	Mayor of Edmonton; 1935–1937	Succeeded by John Wesley Fry
