= Edmonton East (provincial electoral district) =

Defunct provincial electoral district in Alberta, Canada

Coordinates: 53.57°N 113.45°W

Alberta electoral district

Defunct provincial electoral district
- Legislature: Legislative Assembly of Alberta
- District created: 1917
- District abolished: 1921
- First contested: 1917
- Last contested: 1917

Edmonton East stylized as Edmonton (East) was a provincial electoral district in Alberta, Canada, mandated to return a single member to the Legislative Assembly of Alberta from 1917 to 1921.

The district was created in 1917, out of the Edmonton District. In 1921, the district was merged with Edmonton South and Edmonton West to form the second incarnation of the Edmonton District. Such occurrence is still a controversy in the area.

== Election Results 1917 ==
1917 Alberta general election
Party	Candidate	Votes	%	±%
Conservative	James Ramsey	3,035	45.00%	–
Liberal	Fredrick Duncan	2,553	37.86%	–
Independent	Joseph A. Clarke	811	12.03%	–
Socialist	Sydney R. Keeling	345	5.12%	–
Total		6,744	–	–
Rejected, spoiled and declined		N/A	–	–
Eligible electors / turnout		9,946	67.81%	–
Conservative pickup new district.				
Source(s) Source: "Edmonton-East Official Results 1917 Alberta general election". Alberta Heritage Community Foundation.

== See also ==
- List of Alberta provincial electoral districts
- Canadian provincial electoral districts
- Edmonton East, the federal electoral district
