= John Wesley Fry =

Canadian politician

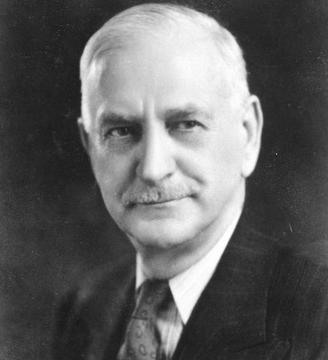

21st Mayor of Edmonton
- In office November 10, 1937 – November 7, 1945
- Preceded by: Joseph Clarke
- Succeeded by: Harry Ainlay

Alderman on the Edmonton City Council
- In office November 9, 1932 – November 10, 1937

Personal details
- Born: December 5, 1876 Woodstock, Ontario, Canada
- Died: December 23, 1946 (aged 70) Edmonton, Alberta, Canada
- Party: Citizens Committee, Civic Government Association, United Citizens of Edmonton, Independent
- Children: Four daughters, one son
- Profession: Teacher, realtor

John Wesley Fry (December 5, 1876 – December 23, 1946) was a politician in Alberta, Canada and a mayor of Edmonton, 1937 to 1945.

== Biography ==
=== Early life ===
John Fry was born in Woodstock, Ontario on December 5, 1876. He grew up in Woodstock and Owen Sound and moved to Regina, Saskatchewan in 1897 to attend Normal School. He received his teaching certificate and taught for three years in Gainsborough, Saskatchewan. He married and moved to a homestead near Lloydminster.

In 1911, he moved to Edmonton and entered the contracting and real estate business.

=== Political career ===
John Wesley Fry served as alderman on Edmonton city council 1932 to 1937, then mayor 1937 to 1945.

He sought office eleven times in his political career, and was never defeated. His first attempt took place in the 1932 election, when he ran to be alderman on Edmonton City Council. He was elected, finishing second of fifteen candidates (five were elected).

He was re-elected in the 1934 and 1936 elections, finishing second each time (with six and five elected, respectively).

Fry resigned midway through his third two-year aldermanic term to run for mayor in the 1937 election, challenging incumbent Joseph Clarke. He defeated Clarke by three thousand votes.

He went on to be re-elected in 1938 (defeating three challengers, including Clarke), 1939 (defeating local member of the Legislative Assembly of Alberta Samuel Barnes), 1940 (defeating two challengers), 1941 (defeating alderman George Campbell), 1942 (by acclamation), 1943 (defeating Thomas Cairns), and 1944 (defeating Rice Sheppard). He did not seek re-election in the 1945 election, and did not seek political office again thereafter.

=== Personal life, death, and legacy ===
In addition to his political activities, John Wesley Fry was a member of the Kiwanis Club, the Masonic Lodge, the Union of Alberta Municipalities, and the Canadian Federation of Mayors and Municipalities (serving as President of the latter two). He died December 23, 1946, survived by his wife, four daughters, and one son.

His eight-year term as mayor was a record in Edmonton's history at that point. William Hawrelak surpassed the record in 1963 (Hawrelak, who served three non-consecutive stints as mayor, served a total of more than nine years). Fry's record of eight consecutive years as mayor was un-equalled until Bill Smith surpassed it by serving from 1995 to 2004. (Smith was re-elected only twice while Fry was re-elected again and again, a total of seven times.)

John Fry Park, a baseball park in Edmonton, is named in Fry's honour.

Preceded by Joseph Clarke	Mayor of Edmonton; 1937–1946	Succeeded by Harry Dean Ainlay
