= Dan Knott =

Canadian politician

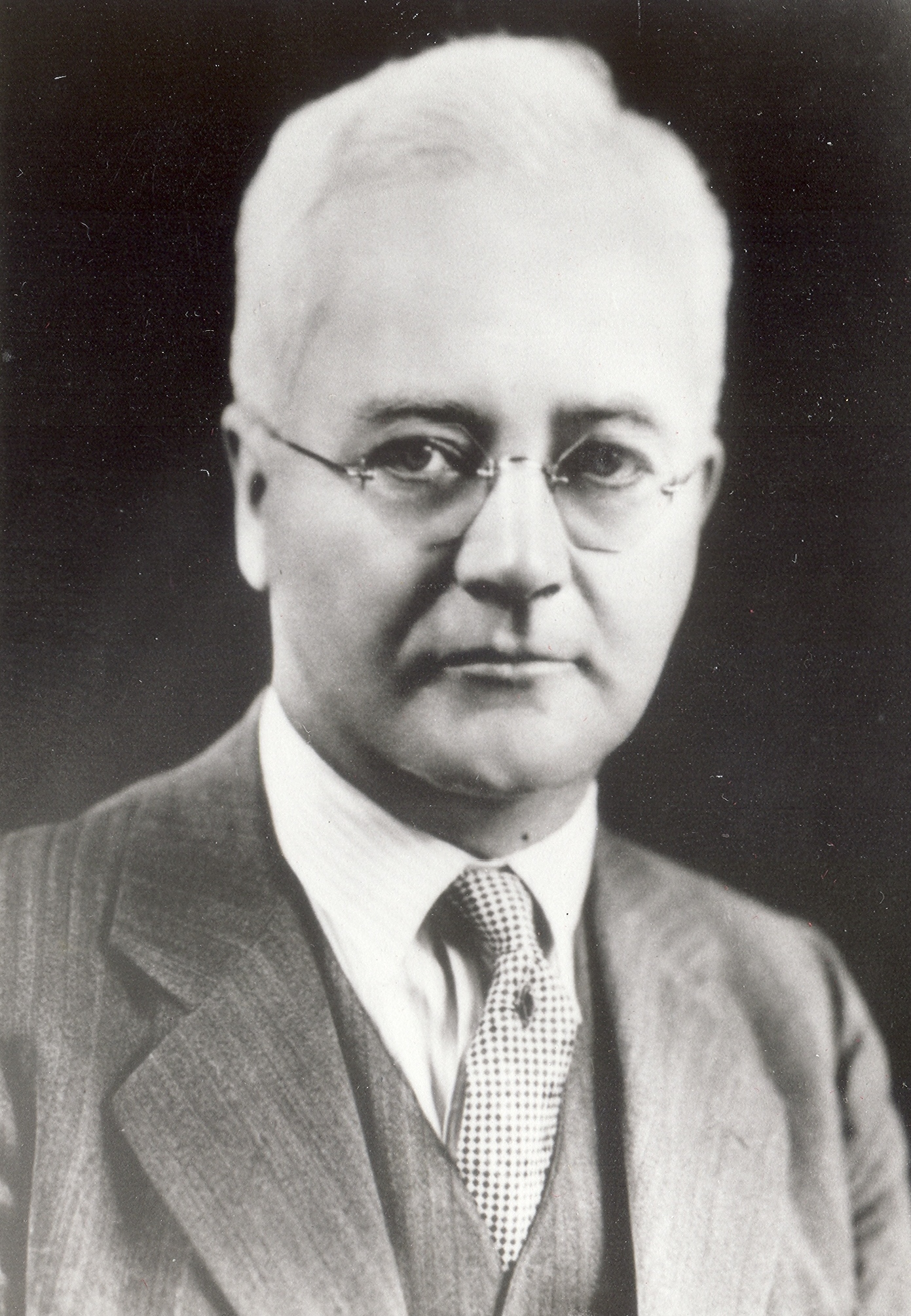

20th Mayor of Edmonton
- In office November 11, 1931 – November 14, 1934
- Preceded by: James McCrie Douglas
- Succeeded by: Joseph Clarke

Alderman on the Edmonton City Council
- In office December 11, 1922 – December 13, 1926
- In office December 9, 1929 – November 11, 1931
- In office November 10, 1937 – November 12, 1941

Personal details
- Born: July 1, 1879 Collingwood, Ontario
- Died: November 26, 1959 (aged 80) Edmonton, Alberta
- Party: Labour, Citizens Committee
- Other political affiliations: Independent
- Spouse: Mina Matheson
- Children: Two sons
- Profession: Printer, teacher

Daniel Kennedy Knott (July 1, 1879 – November 26, 1959) was a labour activist and politician in Alberta, Canada, and a mayor of Edmonton.

== Early life ==
Dan Knott was born in Collingwood, Ontario, on July 1, 1879, to Hugh Knott and Margaret Wright. He apprenticed as a printer and worked for the Buffalo Express before moving to Alberta in 1905 to join his father and brother, who had come west two years earlier. He joined the Edmonton Bulletin in 1906, and later worked for the Calgary Herald. In 1909 he became a linotype operator for the Edmonton Journal; he held that position until his retirement.

He married Mina Matheson in 1907; the couple had two sons.

== Labour Activism ==
In 1910, Knott became president of the local typographical union. He was a member of labour's moderate wing.

He rose through the ranks of organized labour and was a member of the Edmonton Trades & Labour Council's executive committee. During the 1919 citywide strike (held in sympathy with the Winnipeg General Strike of 1919), he was on the strike committee (along with future municipal colleagues Alfred Farmilo and Elmer Ernest Roper). Knott and other strike leaders allowed minimum services, the provision of vital services, This calmed the situation and took pressure off Mayor Joseph Clarke to crush the strike through the use of troops or "special constables" such as were used in Winnipeg to break up the general strike there. Due to the moderate strike leadership and to Clarke's support the strike did not evoke the violence that general strikes elsewhere evoked.

In 1922, Knott was a co-founder of an iteration of the Canadian Labour Party, with which he remained active until its 1935 merger with the Co-operative Commonwealth Federation.

== Elected Politics ==
Organized labour was running a full slate of candidates in Edmonton city elections but not until the late 1920s did it rise to majority control of the Edmonton City Council. Labour took three of the five empty seats in the 1919 Edmonton municipal election and in the 1920 election Knott and five others ran for the six seats open on city council that year. He came in tenth of sixteen candidates and was not elected. (Sam McCoppen was the only Labour candidate elected in 1920.) Knott was more successful during the 1922 election, when he finished sixth and was one of six candidates elected. Labour took one other seat as well - Rice Sheppard was elected. These two added their voices to Labour-man James East who had been elected in 1921.

Knott was re-elected in 1924 election. The Single transferable voting system used meant that both Labour and the business-oriented Citizens Committee won seats. Knott joined with Labour men James East, James Findlay and Lionel Gibbs on council.

Knott made his first bid for mayor in the 1926 election, seeking to take advantage of Kenny Blatchford's retirement from municipal politics. At that time, the mayoral contest was determined by instant-runoff voting. Knott came in second in the first count but did not receive enough votes through transfers to gain a lead over front-runner Ambrose Bury.

Knott was one of three candidates that opposed Bury's re-election bid in the 1927 election. Knott again came in second in the first count. Bury received more than half the vote on the First Count so no votes were transferred.

Knott returned to office as an alderman after the 1929 election. Knott finished fourth of fifteen candidates - the most popular six were elected. (By then Edmonton had dropped its proportional representation system and returned to Block Voting.

He chose to run for mayor rather than seek re-election at the expiration of his two-year term. As the lone challenger to incumbent mayor James McCrie Douglas in the 1931 Edmonton municipal election, Knott received more votes than Douglas - Knott received fifty-eight percent of the vote. Knott was elected. (The Edmonton Ku Klux Klan's participation in his election is examined below.)

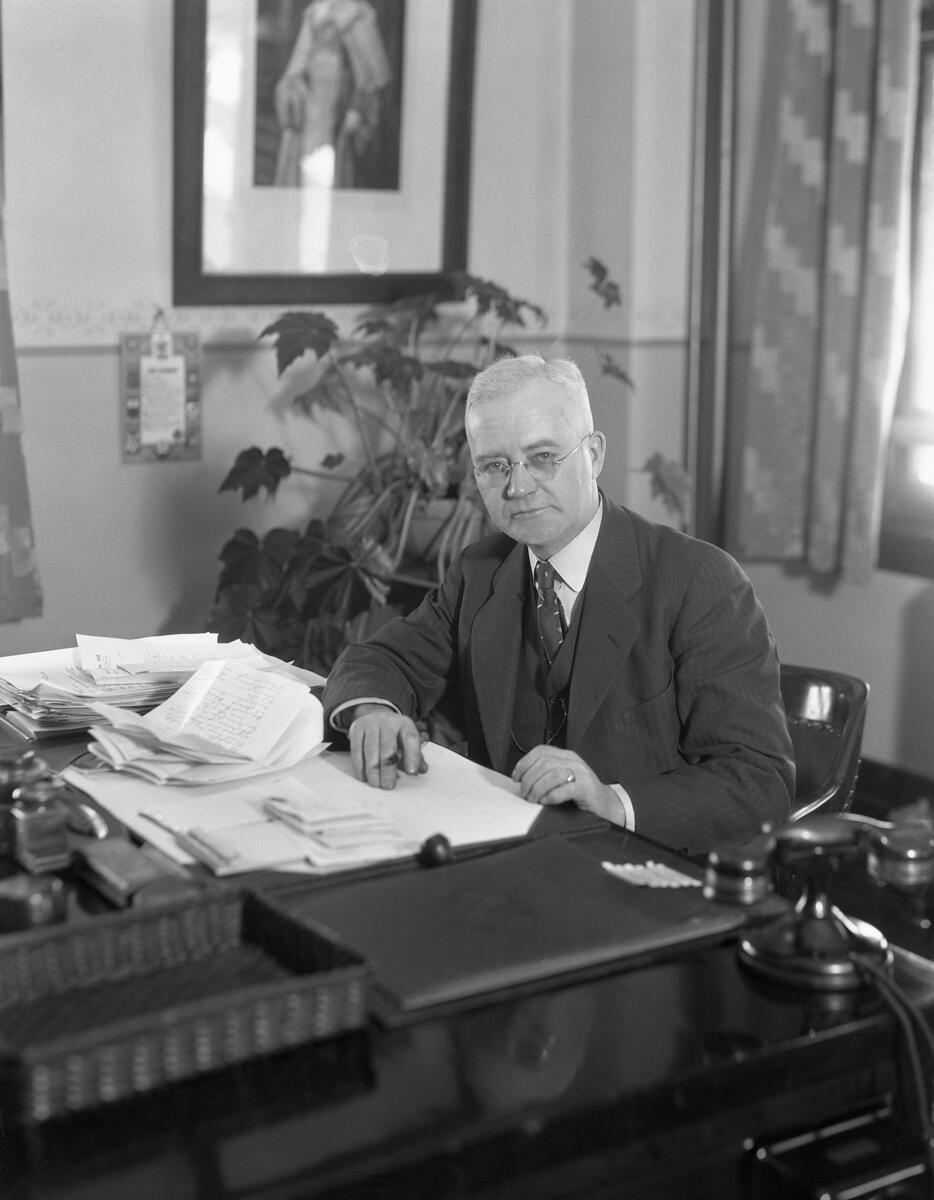
Mayor Dan Knott in office.

As mayor, Knott was a disappointment to many of the labour activists who had helped elect him. In an effort to maintain the city's credit rating and to avoid raising property taxes, he abandoned many of the promises that had brought him to office, especially in the area of public sector job creation. Despite this decision, Knott was re-elected in the 1932 election. After this election, for the first time in Edmonton's history, a Labour mayor (Knott) presided over a city chamber dominated by a Labour city councillors.

In 1932, he acceded to Premier John Brownlee's request for city police to suppress a hunger march protest. Despite this decision, Knott was re-elected in the 1933 election.

While several labour activists, notably city councillor Margaret Crang, denounced Knott as a turncoat, he was able to implement his agenda due to the combined support of Labour Party members who remained loyal to him and moderates on his political right. However, by the 1934 election much of his support was exhausted and he finished third of five candidates, behind his old negotiating partner Joseph Clarke and alderman James Ogilvie. Clarke won the mayor's seat this time.

Knott attempted to return to council as an alderman in the 1936 election, but was soundly defeated, finishing thirteenth of sixteen candidates.

Knott was elected alderman in 1937 and was re-elected in the 1939 election. He was defeated in the 1941 election, in what was his final bid for elected office.

== Association with the Ku Klux Klan ==
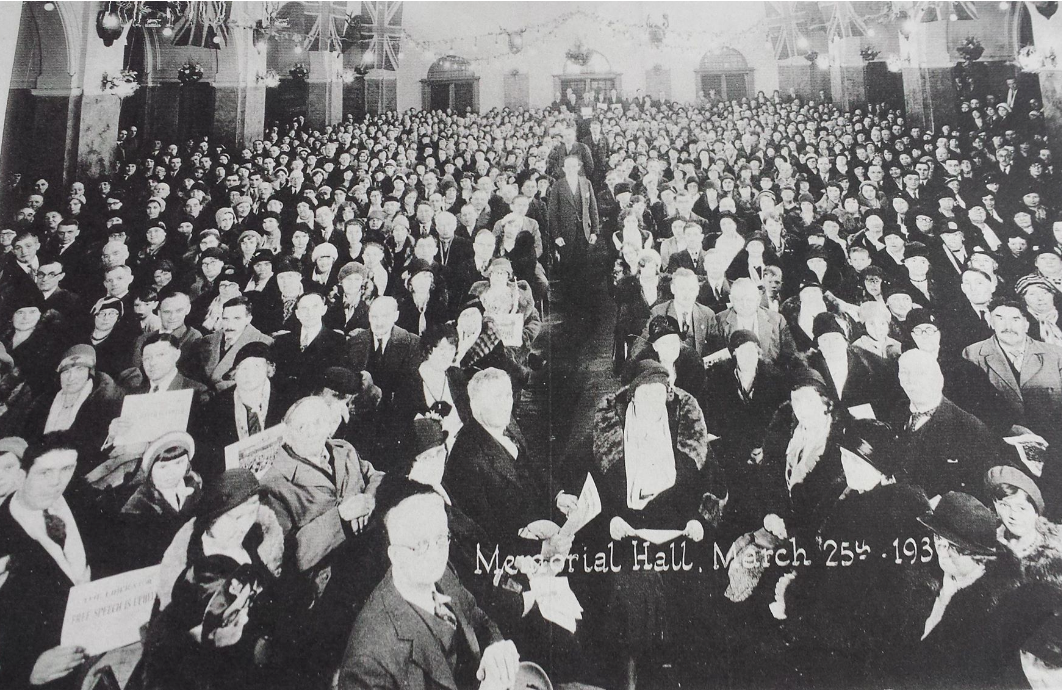
1932 Ku Klux Klan convention in Memorial Hall. The figure pictured at bottom center, wearing glasses and holding a hat may be Dan Knott

The Alberta Klan, led by Imperial Wizard, J.J. Maloney, actively campaigned for Dan Knott's mayoral election and celebrated his 1931 election victory by burning a cross on Edmonton's Connors Hill. While the Klan had received aggressive push back in some municipalities in Alberta, Dan Knott was (perceived to be) tolerant of their activity. On two separate occasions he granted the Klan permission to hold a picnic and erect burning crosses on the Edmonton Exhibition grounds, now known as Northlands. The Klan at the time published their newspaper, the Liberator, out of a downtown Edmonton office at 13, 10105 100th St., near where the World Trade Centre building now stands.

By the next election (Nov. 1932) the Klan had moved to support Joe Clarke. Knott was re-elected, against the Klan's opposition. Kenneth Blatchford, a third candidate in the election, was bullied by the Klan and a few months later died by suicide.

A picture of an Edmonton Ku Klux Klan convention held at the Royal Canadian Legion's Memorial Hall is believed to show Dan Knott in attendance.

== Personal life, death, and legacy ==
Dan Knott was a member of the Masonic Order and the local hospital and library boards. He was an avid bowler, and led the team that swept the 1911 American Bowling Congress in Spokane. Daniel Kennedy Knott died November 26, 1959.

Dan Knott Junior High School in Edmonton, Alberta was named in his honour, however, it was renamed to kisêwâtisiwin School by the Edmonton Public School Board in 2022 due to Dan Knott's potential involvement with the Alberta branch of the KKK.

Preceded by James McCrie Douglas	Mayor of Edmonton; 1931–1934	Succeeded by Joseph Clarke
