= Harry Ainlay =

Canadian politician (1887–1970)

Harry Dean Ainlay

22nd Mayor of Edmonton
- In office November 7, 1945 – November 2, 1949
- Preceded by: John Wesley Fry
- Succeeded by: Sidney Parsons

Alderman on Edmonton City Council
- In office November 11, 1931 – November 13, 1935
- In office November 12, 1941 – November 7, 1945

Personal details
- Born: January 3, 1887 Brussels, Ontario
- Died: March 12, 1970 (aged 83) Haney, British Columbia
- Party: Labour, Civic Democratic Alliance
- Other political affiliations: Cooperative Commonwealth Federation, United People's League, Progressive Civic Association
- Spouse(s): Edith Hamilton (m. 19??; d. 1959); Jean Munday (m. 19??; his death 1970)
- Education: University of Alberta
- Profession: Teacher

Harry Dean Ainlay (January 3, 1887 – March 12, 1970) was a Canadian educator and politician, noted for his many years of service in Edmonton, Alberta, as a teacher and principal with Edmonton Public Schools and as a long time member of Edmonton City Council, including three consecutive terms as Mayor of Edmonton 1945-1949.

== Early life ==
Harry Ainlay was born in Brussels, Ontario to Watson and Emily (née Sparling) Ainlay, and earned his teaching certificate in that province. He came to Alberta in 1907 to help his carpenter father and settled near Stavely for several years before moving to Edmonton in 1912. In 1911, he married Edith Hammill; the two would remain married until her death in 1959.

Ainlay spent several years in the real estate business, then returned to school at the University of Alberta. Upon his graduation in 1920, he returned to teaching, in the Edmonton Public Schools system. Ainlay served as vice-principal of the Queen Alexandra School and principal of the Garneau and Strathcona High School, now Old Scona Academic High School.

== Municipal politics ==
While still serving as an educator, Ainlay first sought public office in the 1930 Edmonton election, when he ran for alderman on Edmonton City Council and was defeated, finishing ninth of twelve candidates. He was successful in the 1931 election, when he finished second of fifteen candidates and was elected to a two-year term. He was re-elected in the 1933 election (finishing third of seventeen candidates), but was defeated in the 1935 election.

Once out of office, Ainlay made his first bid for mayor in the 1936 election, finishing third of five candidates as incumbent Joseph Clarke was re-elected. He made two subsequent unsuccessful attempts to return to aldermanic office (in the 1937 and 1938 elections) before taking three years off from municipal politics.

Ainlay returned to office in the 1941 election, finishing first of fourteen candidates in the aldermanic race. He was re-elected in 1943, but resigned halfway through his two-year term to run for mayor in the 1945 election, when he defeated Winslow Hamilton. He was re-elected in the 1946 and 1947 elections, defeating Thomas Cairns and Frederick Speed, respectively. His 1947 win was notable because it marked the first election in which the mayor was elected to a two-year term.

As mayor, Ainlay introduced daylight saving time in the city after city residents voted in a 1946 municipal plebiscite in favour of the change and after the Government of Alberta refused to bring it in province-wide and refused it in Edmonton although accepting that Calgary would adopt it. Ainlay brought it in as a voluntary thing. Government offices in Edmonton abided by the city's DST, although the government opposed the time change. The next session of the Legislative Assembly of Alberta passed legislation outlawing the use of daylight saving time in any city in Alberta, and Edmonton returned to standard time until Alberta adopted DLT following a successful vote held concurrently with the 1971 Alberta general election.

Harry Ainlay did not seek re-election in the 1949 election, due to health issues arising from a serious fall he had sustained working on his retirement home in BC.

== Provincial and federal politics ==
Ainlay ran in provincial and federal elections a total of four times, each time under the banner of the Co-operative Commonwealth Federation. The first was in a 1936 by-election in the riding of Edmonton, when he finished last in a three candidate field that was won by Liberal Walter Morrish. (The other candidate, United Front candidate Margaret Crang, had been an aldermanic colleague of Ainlay's, and fellow Labour rep, when he had served on city council. Due to her running against Ainlay, she was thrown out of the CCF.)

His second bid for provincial office took place in the 1940 Alberta election, in which Ainlay again ran in the Edmonton riding. He finished eighth of nineteen candidates on the first count (at the time, the riding used a single transferable vote method of electing its representatives), and was not one of the five candidates elected.

Ainlay's lone bid for federal office took place in the 1945 federal election, when he ran in the riding of Edmonton East. He finished second of five candidates, ahead of incumbent Liberal MP Cora Taylor Casselman but still being defeated by Social Creditor Patrick Ashby.

Ainlay repeated the experience finishing ahead of incumbent, but still losing, in his last bid for office. He had moved to British Columbia, where he ran in the 1952 provincial election in the riding of Dewdney. He finished second of four candidates, ahead of incumbent Progressive Conservative Roderick Charles MacDonald, but being defeated by Lyle Wicks of the British Columbia Social Credit League. Already more than 60 years old, this was his last bid for public office.

== Post-political career, death, and legacy ==
After leaving politics, Ainlay was the head of the Yellowhead Route Association in the 1940s and 1950s. He died in Haney, British Columbia on March 12, 1970. He was survived by his second wife, Jean.

In 1966, the newly constructed Harry Ainlay High School was named in his honour. He left an endowment for a $500 scholarship to be given in his name to a graduating student planning on pursuing a career in Education.
