= Sidney Parsons =

Canadian politician

23rd Mayor of Edmonton
- In office November 2, 1949 – November 7, 1951
- Preceded by: Harry Dean Ainlay
- Succeeded by: William Hawrelak

Alderman on the Edmonton City Council
- In office November 9, 1938 – November 2, 1949

Personal details
- Born: April 11, 1893 Revelstoke, near Plymouth, Devon, England
- Died: April 22, 1955 (aged 62) Edmonton, Alberta, Canada
- Party: Citizens Committee, Independent
- Other political affiliations: Labour
- Spouse: Gertrude Florence Smith
- Children: Three sons
- Profession: Bricklayer

Sidney Parsons (April 11, 1893 – April 22, 1955) was a Canadian politician, mayor of Edmonton, Alberta, and candidate for election to the Legislative Assembly of Alberta.

== Early life ==
Parsons was born on April 11, 1893 in Revelstoke, near to Plymouth, Devon, England. He was educated in Plymouth, but he and his parents immigrated to New Jersey in the early 1900s. He attended technical schools there, and began work as a bricklayer with the Standard Oil Company in Bayonne, New Jersey.

In 1910, he moved to Edmonton, where he enlisted in the Canadian army to fight in World War I. He served with the 49th Battalion, under the command of fellow future mayor William Antrobus Griesbach. Upon his return to Canada, Parsons married Gertrude Florence Smitt on January 8, 1918; the pair had three sons.

In his post-war life, Parsons was active in the labour movement and served as an executive officer of the Edmonton Trades & Labour Council. He served as its president from 1941 until 1945.

== Political career ==
Parsons first sought elected office in the 1931 Edmonton election, when he ran for Edmonton City Council as an aldermanic candidate. He finished seventh of fifteen candidates, and was not elected (five were elected). He fared similarly poorly in the 1932 and 1934 elections.

In the 1935 provincial election, Parsons ran as a Labour candidate in the riding of Edmonton. He received the smallest portion of the votes of twenty-seven candidates, winning only fifty-two votes. Edmonton used STV at the time and Parsons was one of the first to be eliminated and have his votes transferred elsewhere.

After this defeat, he returned to municipal politics, and was finally elected alderman in the 1938 election, finishing fourth of thirteen candidates (five were elected using block voting). He was re-elected in 1940 (finishing fourth of eighteen candidates), 1942 (third of twelve candidates), 1944 (third of twelve), 1946 (fourth of thirteen), and 1948 (first of twelve) elections. In 1948 he was the most-popular candidate in the aldermanic race.

in 1949, he resigned halfway through his two-year aldermanic term to run for mayor. Narrowly winning in a five-candidate field, he was elected to a two-year term. He sought re-election in the 1951 election, but was soundly defeated by William Hawrelak. He did not return to public life thereafter.

== Personal life, death, and legacy ==
In later life, Parsons was involved in veterans organizations. He was president of the Ex-Servicemen's Association and was an executive member of the Montgomery branch of the Royal Canadian Legion. He also served as a labour representative on the Edmonton Hospital Board.

Sidney Parsons died April 22, 1955, after a cerebral embolism and was buried at the Edmonton Municipal Cemetery.

Parsons Road and Parsons Industrial, both in Edmonton, are named in his honour.

Preceded by Harry Dean Ainlay	Mayor of Edmonton; 1949–1951	Succeeded by William Hawrelak
