= Jan Lakeman =

John "Jan" Lakeman (April 6, 1887 – November 7, 1956) was a mid-20th century labour rights activist, perennial election candidate and leader of the provincial Communist Party in Alberta, Canada.

== Political career ==
Born in the Netherlands, he came to Canada in 1905, eventually finding work in Edmonton with the Canadian National Railway. He became active in his railway workers union, the One Big Union, the Canadian Labour Party and the Communist Party of Canada. He was the first leader of the Alberta Communist Party after its founding in 1921/1922.

Communists were accepted in the Labour Party in the early 1920s and Lakeman was elected president of the Edmonton association for the Canadian Labour Party Alberta branch. He ran as a CLP candidate in 1926.

After a visit to Moscow in 1929, he was expelled from his union and from the Labour Party and lost his job. He then led fights by unemployed for improved treatment.

Lakeman ran in numerous provincial and federal elections. He ran as a Communist in elections in the 1930s and during World War II after the CPC was renamed the Labor-Progressive Party.

Party political offices
| Preceded by New party | Leader of the Communist Party (Alberta); 1930–1937? | Succeeded by Lawrence Anderson, 1937–1943? |
