= Frederick Clayton Casselman =

Canadian politician

Lieutenant Frederick C. Casselman

Member of Parliament for Edmonton East
- In office 1940–1941
- Preceded by: Orvis A. Kennedy
- Succeeded by: Cora Taylor Casselman

Personal details
- Born: October 2, 1885 Helmville, Montana, U.S.
- Died: March 20, 1941 (aged 55) Ottawa, Ontario
- Party: Liberal Party of Canada

Lieutenant Frederick Clayton Casselman (October 2, 1885 – March 20, 1941) was a soldier, barrister, teacher, as well as a Canadian municipal and federal level politician.

== Military service ==
Casselman joined the Canadian Forces in 1916. He served in the Canadian Expeditionary Force and then the Wiltshire Regiment until 1919.

== Political career ==
Casselman served a long career as an Edmonton municipal politician, he served as a public school trustee from 1928 to 1937. In 1937 he resigned his trustee seat and ran for alderman winning a seat. He held his aldermanic post until he resigned in 1940 to run for the House of Commons of Canada.

Casselman ran in the 1940 Canadian federal election in the Edmonton East as a candidate for the Liberal Party of Canada. He defeated incumbent Member of Parliament Orvis A. Kennedy. Casselman died a year into his first term in office on March 20, 1941, at age 55. His wife Cora Taylor Casselman won election in his place in the subsequent by-election.
