= Charles Gariepy =

Canadian politician (1888–1976)

Alderman on the Edmonton City Council
- In office 1940–1948

Personal details
- Born: March 19, 1888 Montreal, Quebec, Canada
- Died: September 3, 1976 (aged 88) Edmonton, Alberta, Canada

Charles Edouard Gariépy (March 19, 1888 – September 3, 1976) was a Canadian politician. He was elected to the separate Catholic school board from 1929 to 1937. Gariepy was elected to be North side alderman, Edmonton City Council, Alberta, Canada 1940–1948. He was the brother of House of Commons member Wilfrid Gariépy.

== Career ==
Gariépy was elected to a one-year term to fill the seat left by Frederick Clayton Casselman's resignation.

Gariépy was born in Montreal in 1888 to politician Joseph Horindas Gariépy and his wife Etudienne Boissoneault. He joined the Canadian Expeditionary Force in mid 1915 and fought with the 2nd Canadian Division in France. After the signing of the Treaty of Versailles he returned home and moved to Alberta to work with the Canadian National Railway. He was appointed as a judge of the Northern Alberta District Court in 1949.

He married Vivienne de Celles in February 1930, with whom he had three sons, Roger, Pierre, and Jean.
