= 1940 Alberta general election =

- March 21, 1940

57 seats in the Legislative Assembly of Alberta 29 seats were needed for a majority
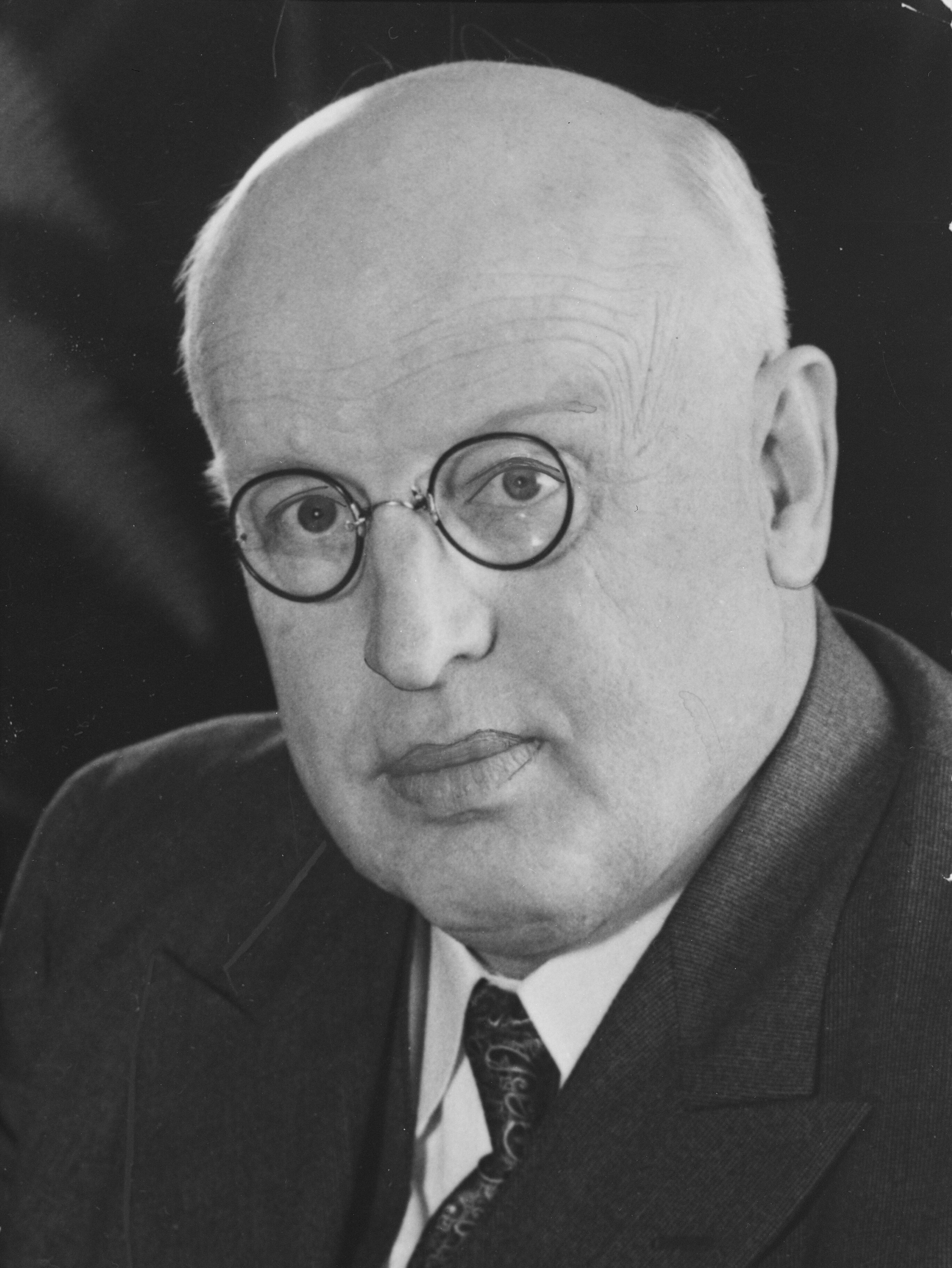

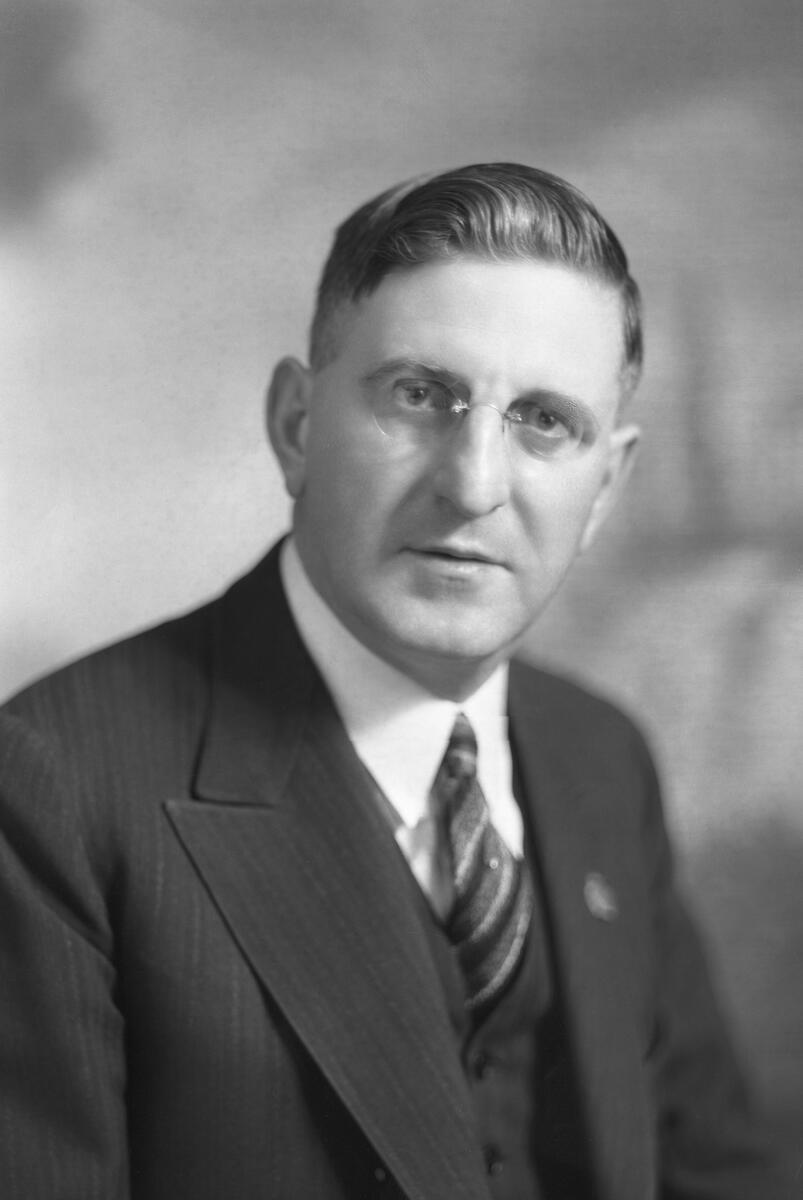
	Majority party	Minority party
Leader	William Aberhart	Andrew Davison
Party	Social Credit	Independent Movement
Leader since	September 3, 1935	1940
Leader's seat	Calgary	Calgary
Last election	56 seats, 54.2%	pre-creation
Seats before	47	—
Seats won	36	19
Seat change	▼11	—
Popular vote	132,507	131,172
Percentage	42.9%	42.5%
Swing	▼11.3%	—
	Third party	Fourth party
	LAB	LIB
Leader	unknown	Edward L. Gray
Party	Labour	Liberal
Leader since	—	June 4, 1937
Leader's seat	—	ran in Edmonton presumably
Last election	0 seats, 1.7%	5 seats, 23.1%
Seats before	0	6
Seats won	1	1
Seat change	▲1	▼5
Popular vote	3,258	2,755
Percentage	1.1%	0.9%
Swing	▼0.6%	▼22.2%
Premier before election
William Aberhart
Social Credit
Premier after election
William Aberhart
Social Credit

The 1940 Alberta general election was held on March 21, 1940, to elect members of the Legislative Assembly of Alberta.

Despite its failure to implement its key policy, providing prosperity certificates to all Albertans, the Social Credit Party of Premier William Aberhart won a second term in government. Nevertheless, it lost eleven seats that it had won in the 1935 landslide.

This provincial election, like the previous three, saw district-level proportional representation (Single transferable voting) used to elect the MLAs of Edmonton and Calgary. City-wide districts were used to elect multiple MLAs in the cities. All the other MLAs were elected in single-member districts through Instant-runoff voting.

== Unity Movement ==
The Conservative and Liberal parties as well as the remains of the United Farmers, recognizing the widespread popularity of the Social Credit party, ran joint candidates as independents in what was called the "Independent Movement", "Unity Movement" or People's League. Although independent candidates won almost as many votes as Social Credit, their support was dispersed across many areas so few of the movement's candidates took a majority of the votes (required under Instant-runoff voting to take the seat) so the movement's overall vote tally did not translate into its due share of seats overall. The Independent Movement lost a number of races by small margins. However, due to the Parliamentary system, which awards power solely on the basis of seats won, Social Credit was returned for a second term, albeit with a considerably reduced majority.

The Liberals under leader Edward Gray chose only to support Independent candidates that they played a hand in nominating, and nominated other candidates under its own banner. Gray felt that candidates should not be machined into the field and left it up to the individual Liberal constituency associations to decide if they would support a candidate or not.

This would be the most opposition that Social Credit would face until 1959.

== Co-operative Commonwealth ==
The social democratic Cooperative Commonwealth Federation nominated candidates for the first time, but failed to win any seats in the legislature, despite winning over 10% of the popular vote under the leadership of former United Farmers of Alberta MLA Chester Ronning. Like Ronning, most of the CCF's candidates had run in the 1935 election for the UFA.

== Reduction of electoral districts ==
An Act was passed in 1939 that provided for the reduction of the number of MLAs from 63 to 57, upon the next election. Calgary and Edmonton now returned five MLAs each instead of six, and the following other changes were made:

Abolished	New
New districts
	Bruce (Note: from parts of Vegreville, Sedgewick and Camrose)
	Spirit River (Note: from part of Grande Prairie)
Renaming of districts
Innisfail	Rocky Mountain House (Note: also drawing in parts of Edson, Red Deer and Lacombe)
Abolition of districts
Nanton-Claresholm	divided among Macleod, Okotoks-High River and Little Bow
Ribstone	divided between Acadia-Coronation and Wainwright
Merger of districts
Acadia; Coronation	Acadia-Coronation
Bow Valley; Empress	Bow Valley-Empress
Reorganization of districts
Cochrane; Pincher Creek; Rocky Mountain	Banff-Cochrane; Pincher Creek-Crowsnest
Sturgeon; Victoria; Whitford	Redwater; Willingdon

== Results ==
Elections to the 9th Alberta Legislative Assembly (1940)
Party	Leader	Candidates	First-preference votes				Seats		
Party	Leader	Candidates	Votes	±	% Fpv	Change (pp)	1935	1940	±
Social Credit	William Aberhart	56	132,507	31,193▲	42.90	-11.35	56	36 / 57	20▼
Independent Movement (Note: compared against combined 1935 totals for UFA, Conservatives and Liberals (other than Grouard))	Andrew Davison	57	130,603	11,178▲	42.28	2.51	6	19 / 57	13▲
Liberal	Edward Gray	2	2,755	483▲	0.89	0.14	1	1 / 57	Steady
Labour		2	3,258	1,828▼	1.05	-0.63	–	1 / 57	1▲
Co-operative Commonwealth	Chester Ronning	36	34,316	34,316▲	11.11	11.11			
Independent Liberal		1	1,136	181▲	0.37	0.06			
Communist		1	1,067	4,704▼	0.35	-1.56			
Independent (Note: 1 in Calgary; 1 in Edmonton)		2	569	2,171▼	0.18	-0.72			
Independent Labour		1	251	27▲	0.08	0.01			
Independent Progressive		4	1,726	1,726▲	0.56				
Independent Social Credit		1	362	362▲	0.12				
Independent Farmer		2	314	314▲	0.10				
Total		165	308,864		100.00%				
Rejected ballots			10,615	2,346▲					
Turnout			319,479	9,458▲	74.8%	7.0▼			
Registered voters			427,335	49,086▲					

== MLAs elected ==
Acadia-Coronation: Clarence Gerhart
Alexandra: Selmer Berg
Athabasca: Gordon Lee
Banff-Cochrane: Frank Laut
Beaver River: Lucien Maynard
Bow Valley-Empress: Wilson Cain
Bruce: James L. McPherson
Calgary: William Aberhart
Calgary: Fred Anderson
Calgary: John J. Bowlen
Calgary: Andrew Davison
Calgary: James Mahaffy
Camrose: David B. Mullen
Cardston: Nathan Eldon Tanner
Clover Bar: Floyd Baker
Cypress: Fay Jackson
Didsbury: Ernest M. Brown
Drumheller: Gordon Taylor
Edmonton: David Milwyn Duggan
Edmonton: Norman James
Edmonton: Hugh John Macdonald
Edmonton: Ernest Manning
Edmonton: John P. Page
Edson: Angus James Morrison
Gleichen: Donald McKinnon
Grande Prairie: Lewis O'Brien
Grouard: Joseph Tremblay
Hand Hills: Wallace Warren Cross
Lac Ste. Anne: Albert Bourcier
Lacombe: Duncan MacMillan
Leduc: Ronald Ansley
Lethbridge: Peter M. Campbell
Little Bow: Peter Dawson
Macleod: James Hartley
Medicine Hat: John Lyle Robinson
Okotoks-High River: John Broomfield
Olds: Norman E. Cook
Peace River: Eld J. Martin
Pembina: George MacLachlan
Pincher Creek-Crowsnest: Ernest Duke
Ponoka: Percy McKelvey
Red Deer: Alfred Speakman
Redwater: James Popil
Rocky Mountain House: Alfred Hooke
St. Albert: Lionel Tellier
St. Paul: Joseph Beaudry
Sedgewick: Albert Fee
Spirit River: Henry DeBolt
Stettler: Chester Reynolds
Stony Plain: Cornelia Wood
Taber: Roy S. Lee
Vegreville: George Woytkiw
Vermilion: William Fallow
Wainwright: William Masson
Warner: James H. Walker
Wetaskiwin: John Wingblade
Willingdon: William Tomyn

=== Synopsis of results ===
Results by riding – 1940 Alberta general election (all except Calgary and Edmonton)
Riding	First-preference votes							Turnout (Note: including spoilt ballots)	Final counts					Winning party	
Name	SC	IndM	CCF	Lib	Lab	Oth	Total	Turnout	SC	IndM	CCF	Lib	Lab	1935	1940
Acadia-Coronation	2,163	1,665	559	–	–	–	4,387	76.3%	2,297	1,963	–	–	–	New	SC
Alexandra	2,215	1,255	1,273	–	–	–		73.1%	2,326	–	1,953	–	–	SC	SC
Athabasca	1,965	1,336	782	–	–	–	4,083	61.9%	2,078	1,497	–	–	–	SC	SC
Banff-Cochrane	1,869	2,931	–	–	–	–	4,800	80.4%	Elected on 1st count					New	IndM
Beaver River	2,555	–	669	–	–	1,254	4,478	70.4%	Elected on 1st count					SC	SC
Bow Valley-Empress	2,035	1,762	–	–	–	–	3,797	70.5%	Elected on 1st count					New	SC
Bruce	2,018	1,433	752	–	–	–	4,203	71.8%	2,203	1,781	–	–	–	New	SC
Camrose	2,472	1,484	1,550	–	–	–	5,506	77.2%	2,582	–	2,508	–	–	SC	SC
Cardston	2,160	1,808	–	–	–	–	3,968	81.9%	Elected on 1st count					SC	SC
Clover Bar	2,252	1,370	1,476	–	–	–	5,098	77.9%	2,418	–	2,261	–	–	SC	SC
Cypress	1,667	2,065	–	–	–	–	3,732	75.3%	Elected on 1st count					SC	IndM
Didsbury	2,312	2,379	–	–	–	–		74.5%	Elected on 1st count					SC	IndM
Drumheller	2,043	1,530	741	–	–	–	4,314	79.8%	2,330	1,720	–	–	–	SC	SC
Edson	1,949	–	798	–	2,211	–	4,958	72.7%	2,100	–	–	–	2,558	SC	Lab
Gleichen	1,457	2,255	670	–	–	–	4,382	75.2%	Elected on 1st count					SC	IndM
Grande Prairie	1,556	1,998	674	–	–	–	4,228	70.4%	1,784	2,233	–	–	–	SC	IndM
Grouard	1,703	–	1,024	1,747	–	–	4,474	62.0%	1,961	–	–	1,965	–	Lib	Lib
Hand Hills	2,547	1,970	–	–	–	–	4,517	75.5%	Elected on 1st count					SC	SC
Lac Ste. Anne	1,612	1,239	1,110	–	–	–	3,961	63.9%	1,839	1,704	–	–	–	SC	SC
Lacombe	2,321	2,061	626	–	–	–	5,008	75.6%	2,457	2,361	–	–	–	SC	SC
Leduc	2,141	1,106	732	–	–	–	3,979	65.9%	Elected on 1st count					SC	SC
Lethbridge	2,760	4,318	–	–	–	–	7,078	83.4%	Elected on 1st count					SC	IndM
Little Bow	2,162	2,034	–	–	–	–	4,196	86.0%	Elected on 1st count					SC	SC
Macleod	2,487	2,446	–	–	–	–	4,933	82.3%	Elected on 1st count					SC	SC
Medicine Hat	2,943	2,863	–	–	–	–	5,806	86.1%	Elected on 1st count					SC	SC
Okotoks-High River	3,178	4,352	–	–	–	–	7,530	80.5%	Elected on 1st count					SC	IndM
Olds	2,345	2,455	–	–	–	362	5,162	76.4%	2,549	2,483	–	–	–	SC	SC
Peace River	2,114	2,253	–	–	–	–	4,367	60.0%	Elected on 1st count					SC	IndM
Pembina	1,589	1,719	743	–	–	–	4,051	60.0%	1,818	1,980	–	–	–	SC	IndM
Pincher Creek-Crowsnest	2,356	2,129	–	–	1,047	–	5,532	86.1%	2,443	2,210	–	–	–	New	SC
Ponoka	1,907	1,920	575	–	–	–	4,402	74.7%	2,045	2,234	–	–	–	SC	IndM
Red Deer	2,083	2,760	–	–	–	971	5,814	77.7%	2,330	3,142	–	–	–	SC	IndM
Redwater	2,226	945	785	–	–	–	3,956	64.9%	Elected on 1st count					New	SC
Rocky Mountain House	2,477	1,496	767	–	–	–	4,740	69.4%	Elected on 1st count					SC	SC
St. Albert	1,692	1,383	552	1,008	–	–	4,635	70.9%	2,018	2,304	–	–	–	SC	IndM
St. Paul	2,270	1,609	813	–	–	–	4,692	70.2%	2,421	1,785	–	–	–	SC	SC
Sedgewick	2,605	1,426	794	–	–	–	4,825	75.7%	Elected on 1st count					SC	SC
Spirit River	1,409	1,087	772	–	–	–	3,268	63.3%	1,707	1,295	–	–	–	New	SC
Stettler	2,668	1,851	784	–	–	–	5,303	78.5%	Elected on 1st count					SC	SC
Stony Plain	1,914	1,228	942	–	–	196	4,280	72.6%	2,213	1,606	–	–	–	SC	SC
Taber	1,879	1,383	576	–	–	–	3,838	80.0%	1,998	1,618	–	–	–	SC	SC
Vegreville	2,223	1,920	523	–	–	–	4,666	75.6%	2,375	2,061	–	–	–	SC	SC
Vermilion	2,203	1,815	936	–	–	–	4,954	76.4%	2,506	2,148	–	–	–	SC	SC
Wainwright	2,296	1,611	1,039	–	–	365	5,311	76.4%	2,583	2,169	–	–	–	SC	SC
Warner	1,558	1,937	–	–	–	–	3,495	83.0%	Elected on 1st count					SC	IndM
Wetaskiwin	2,480	1,874	901	–	–	–	5,255	71.9%	2,761	2,179	–	–	–	SC	SC
Willingdon	2,329	514	968	–	–	–	3,811	64.4%	Elected on 1st count					New	SC

= Open seat
= turnout is above provincial average
= Candidate was in previous Legislature
= Incumbent had switched allegiance
= Previously incumbent in another riding
= Not incumbent; was previously elected to the Legislature
= Incumbency arose from by-election gain
= previously an MP in the House of Commons of Canada
= Multiple candidates

=== Multi-member districts ===
District	Seats won (in order declared)
Calgary	
Edmonton	

Social Credit
Independent Movement

= Candidate was in previous Legislature
= First-time MLA
= Previously incumbent in another district.

== STV and IRV analysis ==
=== Exhausted votes ===
Twenty-eight districts went beyond first-preference counts in order to determine winning candidates:

Exhausted votes (1935)
District	Counts		Exhausted	
District	1st preference	Final	Votes	% of 1st pref
Calgary	45,914	44,830	1,084	2.36
Edmonton	43,743	41,130	2,613	5.97
Acadia-Coronation	4,387	4,260	127	2.89
Alexandra	4,743	4,279	464	9.78
Athabasca	4,083	3,575	508	12.44
Bruce	4,203	3,984	219	5.21
Camrose	5,506	5,090	416	7.56
Clover Bar	5,098	4,679	419	8.22
Drumheller	4,314	4,050	264	6.12
Edson	4,958	4,658	300	6.05
Grande Prairie	4,228	4,017	211	4.99
Grouard	4,474	3,926	548	12.25
Lac Ste. Anne	3,961	3,543	418	10.55
Lacombe	5,008	4,818	190	3.79
Olds	5,162	5,032	130	2.52
Pembina	4,051	3,798	253	6.25
Pincher Creek-Crowsnest	5,532	4,653	879	15.89
Ponoka	4,402	4,279	123	2.79
Red Deer	5,814	5,472	342	5.88
St. Albert	4,635	4,322	313	6.75
St. Paul	4,692	4,206	486	10.35
Spirit River	3,268	3,002	266	8.14
Stony Plain	4,280	3,819	461	10.77
Taber	3,838	3,616	222	5.78
Vegreville	4,666	4,436	230	4.93
Vermilion	4,954	4,654	300	6.06
Wainwright	5,311	4,752	559	10.53
Wetaskiwin	5,255	4,940	315	5.99

=== Calgary ===
The Independent Movement (also called the "Citizens' Slate) fielded six candidates for the five seats. The other parties nominated fewer candidates than the number of open seats.

Party	Candidates			MLAs elected		
Party	1940	1935	±	1940	1935	±
Independent Movement	6	–	6▲	3	–	3▲
Social Credit	4	6	2▼	2	4	2▼
Co-operative Commonwealth	2	–	2▲	–	–	–
Independent Labour	1	1	Steady	–	–	–
Independent	1	1	Steady	–	–	–
Conservative	–	4	4▼	–	1	1▼
Liberal	–	4	4▼	–	1	1▼
Dominion Labor	–	3	3▼	–	–	–
Communist	–	1	1▼	–	–	–
Total	14	20	6▼	5	6	1▼

Calgary (1940 Alberta general election) (five members elected, candidates listed in order of 1st preference vote tallies)
Party	Candidate	FPv%	Count											
Party	Candidate	FPv%	1	2	3	4	5	6	7	8	9	10	11	12
Independent Movement	Andrew Davison	27.15%	12,465	7653										
Social Credit	William Aberhart	26.40%	12,122	12,122	7653									
Independent Movement	James Mahaffy	7.94%	3,645	5,538	5,615	5,672	5,704	5,966	6,041	6,043	6,971	7,040	7,162	9,449
Independent Movement	John J. Bowlen	7.51%	3,447	4,380	4,417	4,431	4,453	4,545	4,586	4,590	5,212	5,254	5,320	7,247
Co-operative Commonwealth	Fred J. White	6.20%	2,846	2,903	3,025	3,037	3,097	3,128	4,179	4,229	4,319	4,461	4,965	5,175
Independent Movement	Joseph Tweed Shaw	5.85%	2,685	3,726	3,746	3,777	3,804	3,994	4,039	4,043	4,592	4,602	4,654	0
Social Credit	Fred Anderson	4.22%	1,939	1,959	4,203	4,213	4,229	4,236	4,369	5,227	5,282	8,744	8020	
Social Credit	Edith Gostick	3.50%	1,605	1,613	2,886	2,905	2,922	2,928	2,985	3,691	3,731	0		
Independent Movement	Norman Dingle	3.22%	1,480	2,084	2,121	2,133	2,158	2,322	2,358	2,363	0			
Social Credit	H.D. Tarves	3.02%	1,386	1,390	1,914	1,918	1,938	1,947	1,979	0				
Co-operative Commonwealth	Robert Alderman	2.83%	1,298	1,333	1,438	1,448	1,487	1,499	0					
Independent Movement	Harry Pryde	1.25%	576	758	766	778	790	0						
Independent Labour	D. V. Mitchell	0.55%	251	266	280	290	0							
Independent	Frank Moodie	0.37%	169	169	186	194	0							
Exhausted ballots		—	—	3	3	6	26	43	72	422	501	507	854	1,084
Electorate: 59,338 Valid: 45,914 Spoilt: 777 Quota: 7,653 Turnout: 46,691 (78.7%)

Calgary (1940 Alberta general election) (analysis of transferred votes, candidates listed in order of 1st preference vote tallies)
Party	Candidate	Maximum round	Maximum votes	Share in maximum round	Maximum votes First round votes Transfer votes
Independent Movement	Andrew Davison	1	12,465	27.15%	
Social Credit	William Aberhart	1	12,122	26.40%	
Independent Movement	James Mahaffy	12	9,449	21.08%	
Independent Movement	John J. Bowlen	12	7,247	16.17%	
CCF	Fred J. White	12	5,175	11.54%	
Independent Movement	Joseph Tweed Shaw	11	4,654	10.33%	
Social Credit	Fred Anderson	10	8,744	19.26%	
Social Credit	Edith Gostick	9	3,731	8.22%	
Independent Movement	Norman Dingle	8	2,363	5.19%	
Social Credit	H.D. Tarves	7	1,979	4.32%	
CCF	Robert Alderman	6	1,499	3.27%	
Independent Movement	Harry Pryde	5	790	1.72%	
Independent Labour	D. V. Mitchell	4	290	0.63%	
Independent	Frank Moodie	3	194	0.42%	
Exhausted votes			1,084	2.36%	

=== Edmonton ===
The Independent Movement presented seven candidates for the five seats being contested.

Party	Candidates			MLAs elected		
Party	1940	1935	±	1940	1935	±
Independent Movement	7	–	7▲	3	–	3▲
Social Credit	5	6	1▼	2	2	Steady
Co-operative Commonwealth	3	–	3▲	–	–	–
Independent Progressive	2	–	2▲	–	–	–
Independent	1	–	1▲	–	–	–
Communist	1	1	Steady	–	–	–
Conservative	–	6	6▼	–	1	1▼
Liberal	–	6	6▼	–	3	3▼
United Farmers	–	1	1▼	–	–	–
Labour	–	6	6▼	–	–	–
Reconstruction	–	1	1▼	–	–	–
Total	19	27	8▼	5	6	1▼

Edmonton (1940 Alberta general election) (five members elected, candidates ranked in order of 1st preference)
Party	Candidate	FPv%	Count														
Party	Candidate	FPv%	1	2	3	4	5	6	7	8	9	10	11	12	13	14	15
Social Credit	Ernest Manning	23.01%	10,066														
Independent Movement	John Percy Page	12.82%	5,607	5,657	5,698	5,774	5,801	6,077	6,118	6,140	6,421	6,466	6,648	6,731	7,935		
Independent Movement	Hugh John Macdonald	9.44%	4,128	4,167	4,189	4,249	4,256	4,318	4,342	4,356	5,029	5,061	5,127	5,184	5,828	6,056	6,649
Independent Movement	Gerald O'Connor	9.08%	3,972	3,988	4,006	4,030	4,047	4,145	4,180	4,187	4,578	4,590	4,627	4,650	5,081	5,263	6,035
Independent Movement	David Milwyn Duggan	8.87%	3,878	3,890	3,926	3,953	3,957	4,085	4,092	4,103	4,229	4,240	4,294	4,318	5,713	5,925	6,731
Independent Movement	L. Y. Cairns	7.58%	3,316	3,326	3,356	3,393	3,395	3,584	3,589	3,599	3,697	3,706	3,781	3,801			
Co-operative Commonwealth	Elmer Roper	4.54%	1,984	2,013	2,033	2,047	2,245	2,280	2,399	2,421	2,455	2,477					
Co-operative Commonwealth	Harry Dean Ainlay	4.21%	1,840	1,866	1,901	1,943	2,105	2,117	2,485	2,552	2,580	2,654	4,539	4,652	4,706	4,724	
Independent Movement	E. C. Fisher	3.67%	1,607	1,620	1,655	1,671	1,681	1,712	1,729	1,738							
Social Credit	Charles Gould	2.73%	1,192	1,771	1,790	1,820	1,826	1,831	1,965	2,342	2,378						
Social Credit	Elisha East	2.55%	1,117	1,593	1,607	1,623	1,631	1,636	1,724	2,375	2,395	3,376	3,422				
Communist	James A. MacPherson	2.44%	1,067	1,088	1,108	1,120	1,135	1,136									
Social Credit	Norman B. James	2.21%	967	1,923	1,932	1,964	1,970	1,972	2,072	2,428	2,440	3,537	3,568	6,355	6,378	6,382	7,133
Social Credit	Charles B. Wills	2.17%	948	1,442	1,450	1,473	1,483	1,493	1,564								
Independent Movement	Marjorie Pardee	1.88%	822	828	843	857	862										
Co-operative Commonwealth	William H. Miller	1.01%	442	457	482	493											
Independent	G. F. Hustler	0.91%	400	412	452												
Independent Progressive	Samuel Barnes	0.64%	282	299													
Independent Progressive	J. H. Green	0.25%	108	112													
Exhausted ballots		—	—	0	24	42	58	66	193	211	250	345	446	761	811	811	2,613
Electorate: 59,685 Valid: 43,743 Spoilt: 1,204 Quota: 7,291 Turnout: 44,947 (75.3%)

Edmonton (1940 Alberta general election) (analysis of transferred votes, candidates ranked in order of 1st preference)
Party	Candidate	Maximum round	Maximum votes	Share in maximum round	Maximum votes First round votes Transfer votes
Social Credit	Ernest Manning	1	10,066	23.01%	
Independent Movement	John Percy Page	13	7,935	18.48%	
Independent Movement	Hugh John Macdonald	15	6,649	17.34%	
Independent Movement	Gerald O'Connor	15	6,035	14.67%	
Independent Movement	David Milwyn Duggan	15	6,731	16.37%	
Independent Movement	L. Y. Cairns	12	3,801	8.84%	
CCF	Elmer Roper	10	2,477	5.71%	
CCF	Harry Dean Ainlay	14	4,724	11.00%	
Independent Movement	E. C. Fisher	8	1,738	3.99%	
Social Credit	Charles Gould	9	2,378	5.47%	
Social Credit	Elisha East	11	3,422	7.90%	
Communist	James A. MacPherson	6	1,136	2.60%	
Social Credit	Norman B. James	15	7,133	17.34%	
Social Credit	Charles B. Wills	7	1,564	3.59%	
Independent Movement	Marjorie Pardee	5	862	1.97%	
CCF	William H. Miller	4	493	1.13%	
Independent	G. F. Hustler	3	452	1.03%	
Independent Progressive	Samuel Barnes	2	299	0.68%	
Independent Progressive	J. H. Green	2	112	0.26%	
Exhausted votes			2,613	5.97%	

== See also ==
- List of Alberta political parties
