= Spirit River (electoral district) =

Defunct provincial electoral district in Alberta, Canada

Coordinates: 55.74°N 118.83°W

Alberta electoral district

Defunct provincial electoral district
- Legislature: Legislative Assembly of Alberta
- District created: 1940
- District abolished: 1971
- First contested: 1940
- Last contested: 1967

Spirit River was a provincial electoral district in Alberta, Canada, mandated to return a single member to the Legislative Assembly of Alberta from 1940 to 1971.

== History ==
=== Boundary history ===
Spirit River was created out of the northern half of the Grande Prairie district for the 1940 election. It contained the towns of Spirit River and Rycroft, and the Peace River formed its northern boundary. It saw no major boundary changes until it was replaced by Spirit River-Fairview, Grande Prairie, and Smoky River in 1971.

=== Representation history ===
Members of the Legislative Assembly for Spirit River
Assembly	Years	Member	Party
See Grande Prairie 1930-1940
9th	1940 - 1944	Henry DeBolt	Social Credit
10th	1944 - 1948	Henry DeBolt	Social Credit
11th	1948 - 1952	Henry DeBolt	Social Credit
12th	1952 - 1955	Adolph Fimrite	Social Credit
13th	1955 - 1959	Adolph Fimrite	Social Credit
14th	1959 - 1963	Adolph Fimrite	Social Credit
15th	1963 - 1967	Adolph Fimrite	Social Credit
16th	1967 - 1971	Adolph Fimrite	Social Credit
See Spirit River-Fairview 1971-1986, Grande Prairie; 1971-1993, and Smoky River 1971-1993

In the 1940 election, Spirit River was picked up by Social Credit candidate Henry DeBolt (for whom the community DeBolt was named). This is despite the fact that the incumbent Social Credit MLA for the area, William Sharpe, was defeated in what remained of the Grande Prairie district by an independent challenger. DeBolt served as MLA for twelve years, but lost the Social Credit nomination for the 1952 election to Adolph Fimrite. He attempted to defend his seat as an independent candidate, but finished last in a field of four candidates.

Fimrite, who won on the second count in 1952, defended the seat until it was abolished in 1971. The last election in this district saw a surge in support for the New Democrats, foreshadowing party leader Grant Notley's 1971 victory over Fimrite in Spirit River-Fairview, which absorbed most of Spirit River.

== Election results ==
=== 1940s ===
1940 Alberta general election
Party	Candidate	Votes	%	±%
Social Credit	Henry DeBolt	1,409	43.12%	-
Independent Movement	G.H. McDonald	1,087	33.26%	-
Co-operative Commonwealth	E.T. Sather	772	23.62%	-
Second count
Social Credit	Henry DeBolt	1,707	56.86%	+13.74%
Independent Movement	G.H. McDonald	1,295	43.14%	+9.88%
No second preference		266		
Total valid votes		3,268		
Rejected, spoiled and declined		188		
Electors / turnout		5,455	63.35%	-
Social Credit pickup new district.				

Final count swing reflects increase in vote share from the first count.

1944 Alberta general election
Party	Candidate	Votes	%	±%
Social Credit	Henry DeBolt	1,984	57.27%	+14.15%
Co-operative Commonwealth	E.T. Sather	1,178	34.01%	+10.39%
Labor–Progressive	Eric Johnson	302	8.72%	
Total valid votes		3,464		
Rejected, spoiled and declined		144		
Electors / turnout		5,592	64.52%	+1.17%
Social Credit hold		Swing		+1.88%

1948 Alberta general election
Party	Candidate	Votes	%	±%
Social Credit	Henry DeBolt	2,155	54.10%	-3.17%
Co-operative Commonwealth	Uri Powell	1,194	29.98%	-4.03%
Liberal	David Keay	631	15.84%	
Total valid votes		3,983		
Rejected, spoiled and declined		282		
Electors / turnout		6,190	68.90%	+4.38%
Social Credit hold		Swing		+0.43%

=== 1950s ===
1952 Alberta general election
Party	Candidate	Votes	%	±%
Social Credit	Adolph Fimrite	1,738	39.76%	-14.34%
Co-operative Commonwealth	R. Graeme Thomlinson	1,222	27.96%	-2.02%
Liberal	Edmund Harrington	861	19.70%	+3.86%
Independent Social Credit	Henry DeBolt	550	12.58%	
Final count
Social Credit	Adolph Fimrite	2,041	59.01%	+21.25%
Co-operative Commonwealth	R. Graeme Thomlinson	1,418	40.99%	+13.03%
No second/third preference		912		
Total valid votes		4,371		
Rejected, spoiled and declined		377		
Electors / turnout		7,158	66.33%	-2.57%
Social Credit hold		Swing		-6.16%

1955 Alberta general election
Party	Candidate	Votes	%	±%
Social Credit	Adolph Fimrite	2,369	51.22%	+11.46%
Liberal	Ed Harrington	1,306	28.24%	+8.54%
Co-operative Commonwealth	R. Graeme Thomlinson	950	20.54%	-7.42%
Total valid votes		4,625		
Rejected, spoiled and declined		332		
Electors / turnout		6,781	73.10%	+6.77%
Social Credit hold		Swing		+1.46%

In 1959, Alberta abandoned instant runoff voting in rural districts, instead electing MLAs by the first past the post method. This change is evident in the dramatic drop in spoiled (incorrectly marked) ballots.

1959 Alberta general election
Party	Candidate	Votes	%	±%
Social Credit	Adolph Fimrite	3,010	63.77%	+12.55
Progressive Conservative	Charles Stojan	1,059	22.44%	
Co-operative Commonwealth	James Graham	593	12.56%	-7.98%
Independent Social Credit	C.J. Lampert	58	1.23%	
Total valid votes		4,720		
Rejected, spoiled and declined		7		
Electors / turnout		7,158	66.33%	-6.77%
Social Credit hold		Swing		-4.95%

=== 1960s ===
1963 Alberta general election
Party	Candidate	Votes	%	±%
Social Credit	Adolph Fimrite	3,077	69.80%	+6.03%
New Democratic	Uri Powell	948	21.51%	+8.95%
Liberal	Lionel Lizee	383	8.69%	
Total valid votes		4,408		
Rejected, spoiled and declined		5		
Electors / turnout		6,478	68.12%	+1.79%
Social Credit hold		Swing		-1.46%

1967 Alberta general election
Party	Candidate	Votes	%	±%
Social Credit	Adolph Fimrite	2,627	56.20%	-13.60%
New Democratic	Bert Strand	1,634	34.96%	+13.45%
Liberal	John Listhaeghe	413	8.84%	+0.15%
Total valid votes		4,674		
Rejected, spoiled and declined		7		
Electors / turnout		6,382	73.35%	+5.23%
Social Credit hold		Swing		-13.53%

== Plebiscite results ==
=== 1957 liquor plebiscite ===
1957 Alberta liquor plebiscite results: Spirit River
Question A: Do you approve additional types of outlets for the sale of beer, wine and spirituous liquor subject to a local vote?
Ballot choice	Votes	%
Yes	762	53.81%
No	654	46.19%
Total votes	1,416	100%
Rejected, spoiled and declined	29	
6,160 eligible electors, turnout 23.46%

On October 30, 1957, a stand-alone plebiscite was held province wide in all 50 of the then current provincial electoral districts in Alberta. The government decided to consult Alberta voters to decide on liquor sales and mixed drinking after a divisive debate in the legislature. The plebiscite was intended to deal with the growing demand for reforming antiquated liquor control laws.

The plebiscite was conducted in two parts. Question A, asked in all districts, asked the voters if the sale of liquor should be expanded in Alberta, while Question B, asked in a handful of districts within the corporate limits of Calgary and Edmonton, asked if men and women should be allowed to drink together in establishments.

Province wide Question A of the plebiscite passed in 33 of the 50 districts, while Question B passed in all five districts. Spirit River voted in favour of the proposal, but the No side also polled a close vote. Voter turnout in the district was the lowest in the province, falling to half of the province wide average of 46%.

Official district returns were released to the public on December 31, 1957. The Social Credit government in power at the time did not consider the results binding. However, the results of the vote led the government to repeal all existing liquor legislation and introduce an entirely new Liquor Act.

Municipal districts lying inside electoral districts that voted against the plebiscite were designated Local Option Zones by the Alberta Liquor Control Board and considered effective dry zones. Business owners who wanted a licence had to petition for a binding municipal plebiscite in order to be granted a licence.

== See also ==
- List of Alberta provincial electoral districts
- Canadian provincial electoral districts
