= Lewis O'Brien =

Lewis O'Brien may refer to:

- Lewis O'Brien (footballer) (born 1998), English footballer for Wrexham
- Lewis O'Brien (Kaurna elder) (born 1930), Aboriginal Elder of the Kaurna people
- Lewis O'Brien (politician) (1868–1955), Canadian politician and doctor
