= Edward Leslie Gray =

Canadian politician (1895–1992)

Member of the Legislative Assembly of Alberta
- In office October 7, 1937 – March 20, 1940
- Preceded by: George Van Allen
- Succeeded by: Ernest Manning, John P. Page, N. B. James, David Duggan, Hugh John Macdonald
- Constituency: Edmonton

Leader of the Alberta Liberal Party
- In office 1937–1940
- Preceded by: William R. Howson
- Succeeded by: James Harper Prowse

Personal details
- Born: April 8, 1895 Maple Valley, Ontario, Canada
- Died: June 13, 1992 (aged 97)
- Party: Liberal
- Education: Ontario Agricultural College
- Occupation: politician

Edward Leslie Gray (April 8, 1895 – June 13, 1992) was a politician and member of the Legislative Assembly of Alberta, Canada.

Gray was born April 8, 1895, in Maple Valley, Ontario to Samuel Gray and Mary Taylor, both of Irish descent.

Gray, running as a Liberal Party candidate, was elected in a by-election in Edmonton that followed the death of MLA George Van Allen. He also became the Alberta Liberal Party leader in 1937. The by-election was one of the first tests of popularity for the Alberta Social Credit Party government.

Gray's election marked the beginning of the Unity Movement. Despite running under the Liberal banner, he was elected with the support of Conservatives. He defeated sitting city councillor Margaret Crang, running on the Progressive Labour label; two-time former Edmonton mayor Joseph Clarke, who ran as a People's Candidate, backed by Social Credit; Communist Leader Jan Lakeman; and Rice Sheppard, an activist in the organized farm movement.

Gray served as Alberta Liberal Party leader until 1940, strongly favouring an anti-Social Credit united front arrangement with Conservatives and former United Farmers of Alberta members. The joint effort eventually took the name the Independent Citizens' Association.

Gray ran in Bow Valley in the 1940 Alberta election, but was defeated.

Gray died on June 13, 1992.

Party political offices
| Preceded by William R. Howson | Leader of the Alberta Liberal Party; 1937–1940 | Succeeded by James Harper Prowse |
Legislative Assembly of Alberta
| Preceded by George Van Allen | MLA Edmonton; 1937–1940 | Succeeded by Ernest Manning; John P. Page; N. B. James; David Duggan; Hugh John Macdonald |
