= People's League =

People's League may refer to any of the following political movements:

- the British Independent Parliamentary Group
- the Canadian People's League
- the Romanian People's Party
- Bharatiya Jana Sangh, a defunct Indian political party
