= Grande Prairie (provincial electoral district) =

Provincial electoral district in Alberta, Canada

Alberta electoral district
- The Grande Prairie district (red) within the City of Grande Prairie (white), 2017 boundaries.

Provincial electoral district
- Legislature: Legislative Assembly of Alberta
MLA
Nolan Dyck
United Conservative
- District created: 1930
- District abolished: 1993
- District re-created: 2017
- First contested: 1930, 2019
- Last contested: 1989, 2023

Demographics
- Population (2016): 46,343
- Area (km²): 111.13
- Pop. density (per km²): 417
- Census division: 19
- Census subdivision: Grande Prairie

Grande Prairie is a provincial electoral district in Alberta, Canada, that has existed twice, first from 1930 to 1993 and again from 2019. It is one of 87 districts mandated to return a single member (MLA) to the Legislative Assembly of Alberta.

== Geography ==
Grande Prairie is a predominantly urban riding. The riding includes most of the city of Grande Prairie, including the downtown core, residential areas to the north, west, and south, and a small agricultural area to the northwest that falls within city limits. Some neighbourhoods on the city's east side are part of Grande Prairie-Wapiti, a rural riding that completely surrounds its urban counterpart.

The riding also includes the community of Flyingshot Lake, which is immediately adjacent to the city but is governed as part of the County of Grande Prairie No. 1.

Grande Prairie is one of only five urban ridings in Alberta outside of Edmonton and Calgary, and the only one located in Northern Alberta.

== Boundary history ==
The first incarnation of Grande Prairie, a sprawling rural district, was created out of the southern half of Peace River in 1930. It was reduced in size for the 1940 election when its northern area was transferred to the new district of Spirit River, and further reduced in 1986 to the city of Grande Prairie and the rural areas to its west and south. The riding was abolished in 1993, with the northern half of the city transferred to the new district of Grande Prairie-Smoky, and the remainder becoming Grande Prairie-Wapiti.

In 2017, the Electoral Boundaries Commission recommended re-uniting the two halves of the city into a new, urban-only district called Grande Prairie, abolishing Grande Prairie-Smoky. The rural areas to the north and east, along with some neighbourhoods on the east side of the city, were transferred to Grande Prairie-Wapiti, which now surrounds the new district.

== Representation history ==
Members of the Legislative Assembly for Grande Prairie
Assembly	Years	Member	Party
See Peace River 1905–1930
7th	1930–1935	Hugh Allen	United Farmers
8th	1935–1940	William Sharpe	Social Credit
9th	1940–1944	Lewis O'Brien	Unity Movement
10th	1944–1948	Ira McLaughlin	Social Credit
11th	1948–1952	Ira McLaughlin	Social Credit
12th	1952–1955	Ira McLaughlin	Social Credit
13th	1955–1959	Ira McLaughlin	Social Credit
14th	1959–1963	Ira McLaughlin	Social Credit
15th	1963–1967	Ira McLaughlin	Social Credit
16th	1967–1971	Ira McLaughlin	Social Credit
17th	1971–1975	Winston Backus	Progressive; Conservative
18th	1975–1979	Winston Backus	Progressive; Conservative
19th	1979–1982	Elmer Borstad	Progressive; Conservative
20th	1982–1986	Bob Elliott	Progressive; Conservative
21st	1986–1989	Bob Elliott	Progressive; Conservative
22nd	1989–1993	Bob Elliott	Progressive; Conservative
See Grande Prairie-Smoky and Grande Prairie- Wapiti 1993–2019
30th	2019–2023	Tracy Allard	United Conservative
31st	2023–present	Nolan Dyck	United Conservative

=== 1930–1993 ===
When the district of Peace River was split in 1930, incumbent MLA Hugh Allen (UFA) chose to run in the new district of Grande Prairie. Since no other candidates ran against him, no election was held, and he was acclaimed.

In 1935, Allen finished third, and Social Credit candidate William Sharpe won the seat up as part of the SC party's landslide victory. However, he served only one term as MLA.

In 1940, the traditional parties - the Liberals and Conservatives - attempted to defeat Social Credit by running joint candidates as independents in what became known as the Unity Movement. Their candidate in Grande Prairie, Lewis O'Brien, defeated Sharpe and other candidates. He won on the second count (rural Alberta elections were conducted using Alternative Voting at that time.). He, too, served only one term as MLA, and did not run for re-election. O'Brien was the only opposition member ever elected in Grande Prairie, making the riding something of a bellwether while it existed.

Social Credit took Grande Prairie back in the 1944 election, with candidate Ira McLaughlin easily cruising to victory. He was re-elected six more times, serving as MLA until 1971. In these elections, any votes cast for opposition candidates produced no representation.

Progressive Conservative candidate Winston Backus won Grande Prairie in 1971. The PCs held the riding until it was abolished, but Backus served only two terms, retiring in 1979. The next PC candidate, Elmer Borstad, served only one term.

The riding's final representative was Bob Elliott, who became MLA in 1982 and served three terms, until Grande Prairie was split in 1993.

=== Current district ===
In the 2019 election, Grande Prairie elected Tracy Allard of the newly-formed United Conservative Party as MLA. Allard retired after one term at the 2023 election and was succeeded by Nolan Dyck.

== Election results ==
=== 1930s ===
1930 Alberta general election
Party	Candidate	Votes
United Farmers	Hugh Allen	Acclaimed
Total valid votes		0
United Farmers pickup new district.		

1935 Alberta general election
Party	Candidate	Votes	%	±%
Social Credit	William Sharpe	2,741	37.04%	
Liberal	W.J. Thomson	2,387	32.25%	
United Farmers	Hugh Allen	1,809	24.44%	
Conservative	J.S. McKenzie	464	6.27%	
Second count
Social Credit	William Sharpe	3,142	50.65%	+13.61%
Liberal	W.J. Thomson	3,061	49.35%	+17.10%
Neither		1,198		
Total valid votes		7,401		
Rejected, spoiled, and declined		401		
Electors / Turnout		10,317	75.62%	
Social Credit gain from United Farmers		Swing		-

Final count swing reflects increase in vote share from the first count.

=== 1940s ===
1940 Alberta general election
Party	Candidate	Votes	%	±%
Independent Movement	Lewis O'Brien	1,998	47.26%	
Social Credit	William Sharpe	1,556	36.80%	-0.24%
Co-operative Commonwealth	William Rigby	674	15.94%	
Second count
Independent Movement	Lewis O'Brien	2,233	55.59%	+8.33%
Social Credit	William Sharpe	1,784	44.41%	+7.61%
Neither		211		
Total valid votes		4,228		
Rejected, spoiled, and declined		226		
Electors / Turnout		6,328	70.39%	-5.23%
Independent Movement gain from Social Credit		Swing		+23.75%

1944 Alberta general election
Party	Candidate	Votes	%	±%
Social Credit	Ira McLaughlin	2,366	55.93%	+19.13%
Co-operative Commonwealth	William Rigby	1,128	26.67%	+10.73%
Independent	D.W. Patterson	736	17.40%	
Total valid votes		4,230		
Rejected, spoiled, and declined		-		
Electors / Turnout		-	-	
Social Credit gain from Independent Movement		Swing		+4.20%

1948 Alberta general election
Party	Candidate	Votes	%	±%
Social Credit	Ira McLaughlin	2,952	62.29%	+6.36%
Co-operative Commonwealth	Leslie Harris	1,019	21.50%	-5.17%
Liberal	Patrick Croken	768	16.21%	
Total valid votes		4,739		
Rejected, spoiled, and declined		373		
Electors / Turnout		7,468	68.45%	
Social Credit hold		Swing		+5.77%

=== 1950s ===
1952 Alberta general election
Party	Candidate	Votes	%	±%
Social Credit	Ira McLaughlin	2,967	61.76%	-0.53%
Liberal	John Cox	935	19.46%	+3.25%
Co-operative Commonwealth	Percy Johnson	902	18.78%	-2.72%
Total valid votes		4,804		
Rejected, spoiled, and declined		356		
Electors / Turnout		7,886	65.43%	-3.02%
Social Credit hold		Swing		-1.89%

1955 Alberta general election
Party	Candidate	Votes	%	±%
Social Credit	Ira McLaughlin	3,240	57.49%	-4.27%
Liberal	Mary Gray	1,481	26.28%	+6.82%
Co-operative Commonwealth	James Hughson	538	9.55%	-9.23%
Conservative	Paul Galway	377	6.69%	
Total valid votes		5,636		
Rejected, spoiled, and declined		482		
Electors / Turnout		9,694	70.77%	+4.57%
Social Credit hold		Swing		-5.55%

In 1959, Alberta abandoned instant runoff voting in rural districts, instead electing MLAs by the first past the post method. Although a second round had not been needed in Grande Prairie since 1940, this change is evident in the dramatic drop in rejected (incorrectly marked) ballots.

1959 Alberta general election
Party	Candidate	Votes	%	±%
Social Credit	Ira McLaughlin	4,213	65.62%	+8.13%
Progressive Conservative	David Williamson	1,391	21.67%	+14.98%
Liberal	Mac Perkins	816	12.71%	-13.57
Total valid votes		6,420		
Rejected, spoiled, and declined		19		
Electors / Turnout		9,694	66.42%	-4.35%
Social Credit hold		Swing		-3.43%

=== 1960s ===
1963 Alberta general election
Party	Candidate	Votes	%	±%
Social Credit	Ira McLaughlin	4,763	73.03%	+7.41%
Liberal	Ed Kimpe	997	15.29%	+2.58%
New Democratic	Charles Evaskevich	762	11.68%	
Total valid votes		6,522		
Rejected, spoiled, and declined		8		
Electors / Turnout		11,368	57.44%	-8.98%
Social Credit hold		Swing		+2.42%

1967 Alberta general election
Party	Candidate	Votes	%	±%
Social Credit	Ira McLaughlin	4,847	55.54%	-17.49%
New Democratic	Alan Bush	2,748	31.49%	+19.81%
Liberal	George Repka	1,132	12.97%	-2.32%
Total valid votes		8,727		
Rejected, spoiled, and declined		25		
Electors / Turnout		12,666	69.10%	+11.66%
Social Credit hold		Swing		-18.65%

=== 1970s ===
1971 Alberta general election
Party	Candidate	Votes	%	±%
Progressive Conservative	Winston Backus	4,553	42.76%	
Social Credit	William Bowes	4,104	38.54%	-17.00%
New Democratic	Arthur Macklin	1,992	18.71%	-12.78%
Total valid votes		10,649		
Rejected, spoiled, and declined		32		
Electors / Turnout		14,157	75.45%	+6.35%
Progressive Conservative gain from Social Credit		Swing		+29.88%

1975 Alberta general election
Party	Candidate	Votes	%	±%
Progressive Conservative	Winston Backus	6,466	61.27%	+18.51%
New Democratic	Ross Campbell	1,962	18.59%	-0.12%
Social Credit	John Baergen	1,475	13.98%	-24.56%
Liberal	Gordon Astle	651	6.17%	
Total valid votes		10,554		
Rejected, spoiled, and declined		32		
Electors / Turnout		16,615	63.71%	-11.74%
Progressive Conservative hold		Swing		+9.32%

1979 Alberta general election
Party	Candidate	Votes	%	±%
Progressive Conservative	Elmer Borstad	6,313	50.26%	-11.01%
Social Credit	Donald Wood	3,380	26.91%	+12.93%
New Democratic	Ross Campbell	2,266	18.04%	-0.55%
Liberal	Helen Rice	601	4.79%	-1.38%
Total valid votes		12,560		
Rejected, spoiled, and declined		5		
Electors / Turnout		20,718	60.79%	-2.92%
Progressive Conservative hold		Swing		-11.97%

=== 1980s ===
1982 Alberta general election
Party	Candidate	Votes	%	±%
Progressive Conservative	Bob Elliott	9,555	58.22%	+7.96%
New Democratic	Bernie Desrosiers	3,280	19.98%	+1.94%
Western Canada Concept	Jack Smith	2,249	13.70%	
Independent	Jake Paetkau	504	3.07%	
Social Credit	Roy Housworth	494	3.01%	-23.90%
Liberal	Colin Nash	331	2.02%	-2.77%
Total valid votes		16,413		
Rejected, spoiled, and declined		31		
Electors / Turnout		24,639	66.74%	+5.95%
Progressive Conservative hold		Swing		+3.01%

1986 Alberta general election
Party	Candidate	Votes	%	±%
Progressive Conservative	Bob Elliott	6,239	61.58%	+3.36%
New Democratic	Bernie Desrosiers	3,095	30.55%	+10.57%
Representative	Andy Haugen	557	5.50%	
Independent	Roy Housworth	240	2.37%	
Total valid votes		10,131		
Rejected, spoiled, and declined		26		
Electors / Turnout		22,209	45.73%	-21.01%
Progressive Conservative hold		Swing		-3.61%

1989 Alberta general election
Party	Candidate	Votes	%	±%
Progressive Conservative	Bob Elliott	5,319	52.62%	-8.96%
New Democratic	Evelyn Vardalas	2,696	26.67%	-3.88%
Liberal	Irv Macklin	1,611	15.94%	
Social Credit	Murray Gauvreau	482	4.77%	
Total valid votes		10,108		
Rejected, spoiled, and declined		20		
Electors / Turnout		22,850	44.32%	-1.41%
Progressive Conservative hold		Swing		-2.54%

=== 2010s ===
2015 Alberta general election redistributed results
Party	Votes	%
New Democratic	4,785	33.96
Progressive Conservative	4,404	31.25
Wildrose	3,355	23.81
Alberta Party	1,201	8.52
Liberal	346	2.46
Source(s) Source: Ridingbuilder

2019 Alberta general election
Party	Candidate	Votes	%	±%
United Conservative	Tracy Allard	12,713	63.02	+7.95
New Democratic	Todd Russell	4,361	21.62	-12.34
Alberta Party	Grant Berg	2,516	12.47	+3.95
Freedom Conservative	Bernard Hancock	392	1.94	–
Alberta Independence	Ray Robertson	126	0.62	–
Independent	Rony Rajput	66	0.33	–
Total		20,174	98.94	–
Rejected, spoiled and declined		217	1.06	–
Turnout		20,391	64.17	–
Eligible electors		31,775	–	
United Conservative notional hold		Swing		+10.15
Source(s) Source: "63 - Grande Prairie, 2019 Alberta general election". officialresults.elections.ab.ca. Elections Alberta.

=== 2023 ===
2023 Alberta general election
Party	Candidate	Votes	%	±%
United Conservative	Nolan Dyck	10,001	63.94	+0.92
New Democratic	Kevin McLean	4,890	31.26	+9.65
Alberta Independence	David Braun	348	2.22	+1.60
Alberta Party	Preston Mildenberger	242	1.55	-10.92
Green	Shane Diederich	160	1.02	–
Total		15,641	99.55	–
Rejected and declined		71	0.45	
Turnout		15,712	48.70	
Eligible voters		32,263		
United Conservative hold		Swing		-4.36
Source(s) Source: Elections Alberta

== Plebiscite results ==
=== 1957 liquor plebiscite ===
1957 Alberta liquor plebiscite results: Grande Prairie
Question A: Do you approve additional types of outlets for the sale of beer, wine and spirituous liquor subject to a local vote?
Ballot choice	Votes	%
Yes	1,462	58.57%
No	1,034	41.43%
Total votes	2,496	100%
Rejected, spoiled and declined	9	
8,907 eligible electors, turnout 28.12%

On October 30, 1957, a stand-alone plebiscite was held province wide in all 50 of the then current provincial electoral districts in Alberta. The government decided to consult Alberta voters to decide on liquor sales and mixed drinking after a divisive debate in the Legislature. The plebiscite was intended to deal with the growing demand for reforming antiquated liquor control laws.

The plebiscite was conducted in two parts. Question A asked in all districts, asked the voters if the sale of liquor should be expanded in Alberta, while Question B asked in a handful of districts within the corporate limits of Calgary and Edmonton asked if men and woman were allowed to drink together in establishments.

Province wide Question A of the plebiscite passed in 33 of the 50 districts while Question B passed in all five districts. Grande Prairie voted in favour of the proposal by a solid majority. Voter turnout in the district was abysmal, and one of the lowest districts in the province falling well under the province wide average of 46%.

Official district returns were released to the public on December 31, 1957. The Social Credit government in power at the time did not considered the results binding. However the results of the vote led the government to repeal all existing liquor legislation and introduce an entirely new Liquor Act.

Municipal districts lying inside electoral districts that voted against the Plebiscite were designated Local Option Zones by the Alberta Liquor Control Board and considered effective dry zones, business owners that wanted a license had to petition for a binding municipal plebiscite in order to be granted a license.

== See also ==
- List of Alberta provincial electoral districts
- Canadian provincial electoral districts
