= Spirit River-Fairview =

Defunct provincial electoral district in Alberta, Canada

Coordinates: 56.0°N 118.7°W

Alberta electoral district

Defunct provincial electoral district
- Legislature: Legislative Assembly of Alberta
- District created: 1971
- District abolished: 1986
- First contested: 1971
- Last contested: 1984

Spirit River-Fairview was a provincial electoral district in northwestern Alberta, Canada, mandated to return a single member to the Legislative Assembly of Alberta using the first-past-the-post method of voting from 1971 to 1986.

== History ==
Spirit River-Fairview electoral district was created prior to the 1971 Alberta general election by merger of the Spirit River and Dunvegan electoral districts. The district was abolished in 1986 and recreated into Dunvegan.

=== Boundary history ===
Spirit River-Fairview was created in 1971 out of Dunvegan and the north half of Spirit River. It contained the communities of Spirit River, Fairview and Rycroft, and extended northward past the Chinchaga River. Its boundaries remained unchanged until it was abolished in 1986 and replaced by the second incarnation of Dunvegan.

=== Representation history ===
Members of the Legislative Assembly for Spirit River-Fairview
Assembly	Years	Member	Party
See Spirit River 1940-1971 and Dunvegan 1959-1971
17th	1971 - 1975	Grant Notley	New Democrat
18th	1975 - 1979	Grant Notley	New Democrat
19th	1979 - 1982	Grant Notley	New Democrat
20th	1982 - 1984	Grant Notley	New Democrat
20th	1984 - 1985	Vacant	
20th	1985 - 1986	Jim Gurnett	New Democrat
See Dunvegan 1986-2004

Spirit River-Fairview's first MLA was NDP leader Grant Notley. He is the father of premier Rachel Notley, who was seven years old when he was first elected. Notley was the only New Democrat elected in 1971, and would remain the party's only MLA until 1982. He served as leader of the opposition until his untimely death in a plane crash on October 19, 1984. Notley's closest competition during his career came in 1982 with Progressive Conservative physician Doug Snider who advocated for a hospital to be built in the community.

The resulting by-election in 1985 saw the NDP hold Spirit River-Fairview, with Jim Gurnett serving as MLA for the remainder of the term, after which the riding was abolished. This made Spirit River-Fairview the only rural riding in Alberta to have elected only New Democrats to the Legislative Assembly until the 2015 Alberta election.

== Election results ==
=== 1971 ===
1971 Alberta general election
Party	Candidate	Votes	%	±%
New Democratic	Grant Notley	2,400	38.74%	+3.43%
Social Credit	Adolph Fimrite	2,246	36.26%	-5.58%
Progressive Conservative	Don Moore	1,439	23.23%	
Independent	Michael Zuk	110	1.78%	
Total valid votes		6,195		
Rejected, spoiled, and declined		45		
Electors / Turnout		7,705	80.99%	+13.90%
New Democratic notional gain from Social Credit		Swing		+4.51%

Swing is calculated from the 1967 result in Dunvegan, which had similar boundaries.

=== 1975 ===
1975 Alberta general election
Party	Candidate	Votes	%	±%
New Democratic	Grant Notley	3,017	50.83%	+12.09%
Progressive Conservative	Alex Woronuk	2,918	49.17%	+25.94%
Total valid votes		5,935		
Rejected, spoiled, and declined		49		
Electors / Turnout		7,380	81.08%	+0.09%
New Democratic hold		Swing		-6.93%

=== 1979 ===
1979 Alberta general election
Party	Candidate	Votes	%	±%
New Democratic	Grant Notley	3,657	54.19%	+3.36%
Progressive Conservative	Jim Reynolds	2,668	39.53%	-9.64%
Social Credit	Aubrey Milner	356	5.27%	
Liberal	Terry Fletcher	68	1.01%	
Total valid votes		6,749		
Rejected, spoiled, and declined		17		
Electors / Turnout		8,458	80.00%	-1.08%
New Democratic hold		Swing		+6.50%

=== 1982 ===
1982 Alberta general election
Party	Candidate	Votes	%	±%
New Democratic	Grant Notley	3,443	44.16%	-10.03%
Progressive Conservative	Doug Snider	3,260	41.82%	+2.29%
Western Canada Concept	Dan Fletcher	1,093	14.02%	
Total valid votes		7,796		
Rejected, spoiled, and declined		38		
Electors / Turnout		9,476	82.67%	+2.67%
New Democratic hold		Swing		-6.16%

=== 1985 by-election ===
Alberta provincial by-election, February 21, 1985 Upon the death of Grant Notley on October 19, 1984
Party	Candidate	Votes	%	±%
New Democratic	Jim Gurnett	2,509	36.69%	-7.47%
Progressive Conservative	Verna Block	2,047	29.93%	-11.89%
Western Canada Concept	Dan Fletcher	1,713	25.05%	+11.03%
Confederation of Regions	Elmer Knutson	311	4.55%	–
Liberal	Rick Nicholson	162	2.37%	–
Social Credit	Ray Nielson	79	1.16%	–
Heritage	Mike Pawlus	18	0.26%	–
Total valid votes		6,839	–	–
Rejected, spoiled, and declined		11	–	–
Electors / turnout		10,545	64.96%	-17.71%
New Democratic hold		Swing		+2.21%
Source(s) Source: "Official By-election Results". Elections Alberta. December 11, 1985.

== See also ==
- List of Alberta provincial electoral districts
- Canadian provincial electoral districts
- Spirit River, a town in northern Alberta
- Fairview, a town in northern Alberta
