= Tracy Allard =

Canadian politician

The Honourable Tracy Allard ECA
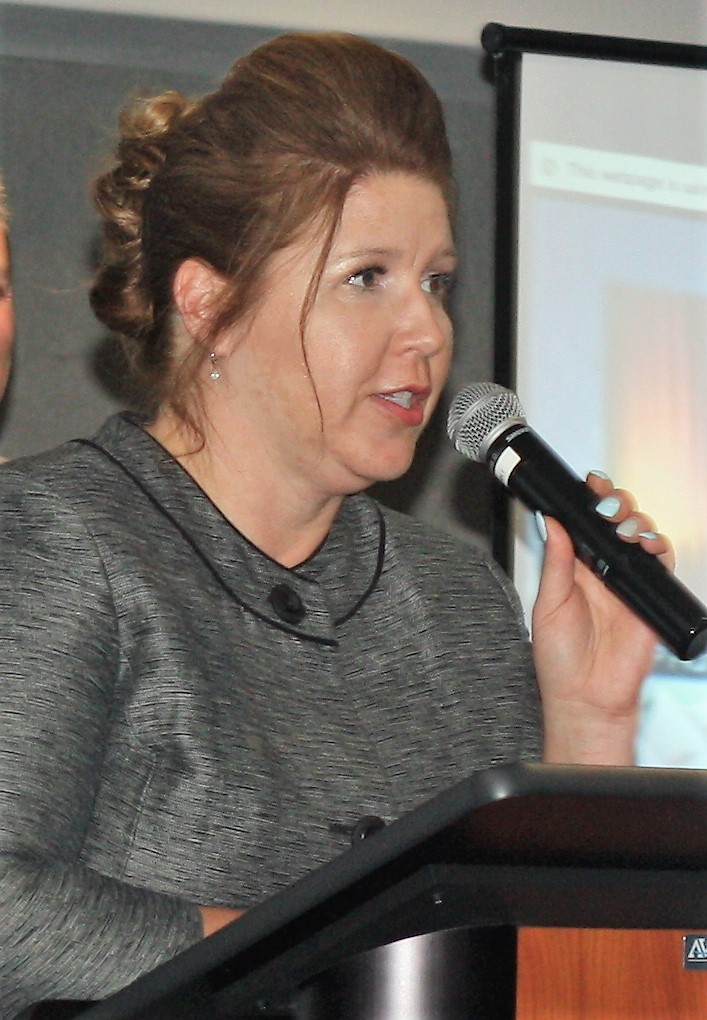

Alberta Minister of Municipal Affairs
- In office August 25, 2020 – January 4, 2021
- Premier: Jason Kenney
- Preceded by: Kaycee Madu
- Succeeded by: Ric McIver

Member of the Legislative Assembly of Alberta for Grande Prairie
- In office April 16, 2019 – May 29, 2023
- Preceded by: Riding re-established
- Succeeded by: Nolan Dyck

Personal details
- Born: 1970 or 1971 (age 55–56)
- Party: United Conservative Party
- Education: University of British Columbia (BComm)

Tracy Allard ECA (born 1971) is a Canadian politician who represented Grande Prairie in the Legislative Assembly of Alberta from 2019 to 2023. A member of the United Conservative Party (UCP), she was minister of municipal affairs from August 2020 to January 2021.

== Early life ==
Tracy Allard attended the University of British Columbia completing a Bachelor of Commerce and a certificate in disability management. She and her husband Serge own and operate two Tim Hortons franchises, located in Grande Prairie, Alberta.

== Political career ==
Allard was selected as the United Conservative candidate in Grande Prairie. She won the seat 2019 Alberta general election, with the UCP also forming government.

In November 2019, Allard was appointed as chairwoman of the Northern Alberta Development Council.

In March 2020, Allard was one of seven people named to a panel of Joint Working Group on Missing and Murdered Indigenous Women and Girls which will work on recommendations for Alberta's action plan regarding the issue.

Allard was appointed as Minister of Municipal Affairs on August 25, 2020, and the former Minister Kaycee Madu was appointed Minister of Justice and Solicitor General.

On October 21, 2020, Allard tested positive for COVID-19.

== COVID-19 Controversy ==
=== Travel Scandal ===
In December 2020, Allard took a family vacation to Hawaii despite federal and provincial government advice to avoid non-essential travel and the border between Canada and the United States being closed. Premier Jason Kenney originally defended Allard stating that such travel was important to protect the travel industry, including Calgary-based Westjet. On January 4, 2021, Allard resigned as Minister of Municipal Affairs over the matter.

=== Vaccination Campaign ===
In September 2021, Allard sent a newsletter to her constituents that encouraged the government to support "natural immunity" which was criticized by the opposition Alberta New Democratic Party.

== Electoral history ==
2019 Alberta general election: Grande Prairie
Party	Candidate	Votes	%	±%
United Conservative	Tracy Allard	12,713	63.02	+7.95
New Democratic	Todd Russell	4,361	21.62	-12.34
Alberta Party	Grant Berg	2,516	12.47	+3.95
Freedom Conservative	Bernard Hancock	392	1.94	–
Alberta Independence	Ray Robertson	126	0.62	–
Independent	Rony Rajput	66	0.33	–
Total		20,174	98.94	–
Rejected, spoiled and declined		217	1.06	–
Turnout		20,391	64.17	–
Eligible electors		31,775	–	
United Conservative notional hold		Swing		+10.15
Source(s) Source: "63 - Grande Prairie, 2019 Alberta general election". officialresults.elections.ab.ca. Elections Alberta.

Alberta provincial government of Jason Kenney
Cabinet post (1)
Predecessor	Office	Successor
Kaycee Madu	Minister of Municipal Affairs; August 25, 2020–January 4, 2021	Ric McIver
