= Hugh Allen (politician) =

Canadian politician

Hugh Wright Allen

Member of the Legislative Assembly of Alberta
- In office June 28, 1926 – June 19, 1930
- Preceded by: Herbert Greenfield
- Succeeded by: William Bailey
- Constituency: Peace River
- In office June 19, 1930 – August 22, 1935
- Preceded by: New District
- Succeeded by: William Sharpe
- Constituency: Grande Prairie

Minister of Municipal Affairs
- In office July 10, 1934 – September 3, 1935
- Preceded by: Richard Reid
- Succeeded by: Charles Cockroft

Minister of Lands and Mines
- In office July 10, 1934 – September 3, 1935
- Preceded by: Richard Reid
- Succeeded by: Charles Ross

Personal details
- Born: April 30, 1889 Stella, Ontario
- Died: March 2, 1972 (aged 82)
- Party: United Farmers
- Occupation: politician

Hugh Wright Allen (April 30, 1889 – March 2, 1972) was a provincial politician from Alberta, Canada. He served as a member of the Legislative Assembly of Alberta from 1926 to 1935, sitting with the United Farmers of Alberta caucus. During his time in office, he served as a cabinet minister in the governments of Premier's John Brownlee and Richard Reid.

== Political career ==
Allen ran for a seat in the Alberta Legislature in the 1926 Alberta general election. He ran as the United Farmers candidate in the Peace River provincial electoral district, winning on the first count. Allen defeated two other candidates and took 54% of the popular vote to hold the seat for his party.

Due to boundary redistribution in the 1930 Alberta general election. The city of Grande Prairie got its own electoral district. Allen ran for re-election in the new Grande Prairie provincial electoral district. Allen was acclaimed.

On July 10, 1934, Premier Richard Reid appointed Allen to the Executive Council of Alberta. He was appointed to two cabinet portfolios, the first as the Minister of Municipal Affairs and the second as the Minister of Lands and Mines.

Allen ran for a third term in office in the 1935 Alberta general election. The election was hotly contested and turned out to be the closest race in the province. Social Credit candidate William Sharpe defeated Allen on the final count.
