= Jim Gurnett =

Canadian politician

Member of the Legislative Assembly of Alberta for Spirit River-Fairview
- In office 1985–1986
- Preceded by: Grant Notley
- Succeeded by: district abolished

Personal details
- Born: October 10, 1949 (age 76) Calgary, Alberta
- Party: Alberta New Democratic Party

James Gurnett (born October 10, 1949) is a former politician from Alberta, Canada. He served as a member of the Legislative Assembly of Alberta from 1985 until 1986. He is currently the principal of Common Place Services, doing a variety of consulting work, primarily with NGOs.

== Career ==
Gurnett was executive director of Edmonton Mennonite Centre for Newcomers from 2001-2009. EMCN is a civil society organization providing programs and services for people who are immigrants and refugees, including settlement assistance, language training, employment and career services, community development, counselling, housing, and advocacy.

Previously, Gurnett was manager of community services at Bissell Centre, serving people living in poverty in Edmonton’s urban core (1999–2001). Prior to that he set up and was executive director of the Hope Foundation (1993–1999), affiliated with the faculty of education at the University of Alberta, as a centre for research and services related to the intentional use of hope as a means of enjoying enhanced quality of life.

For fifteen years Gurnett worked as teacher, program facilitator and administrator at schools in Alberta and Afghanistan. He has been a member of the Legislative Assembly of Alberta (Spirit River-Fairview, 1985–86), chief of staff for the NDP caucus at the Alberta Legislature (2010-2012), director of communications and outreach for the Official Opposition at the Alberta Legislature (1990–1993), and a newspaper editor.

Gurnett was elected to the Alberta Legislature in a by-election for Spirit River-Fairview after the local MLA, party leader Grant Notley, died in a plane crash. He was a candidate for the Alberta New Democratic Party.

The Legislature was dissolved a little more than a year later and he ran for a second term in office. His electoral district of Spirit River-Fairview was redistributed for the 1986 Alberta general election and he ran in the new electoral district of Dunvegan. The election was a hotly contested two way race that saw him lose by two hundred votes to Progressive Conservative candidate Glen Clegg. He attempted to win his seat back in the 1989 Alberta general election. Despite a strong showing Clegg won his second term by a larger margin.

Gurnett then ran in Sherwood Park (electoral district) in the 1993 provincial election, placing third.
