= Wapiti Aviation Flight 402 =

1984 passenger plane crash in Alberta

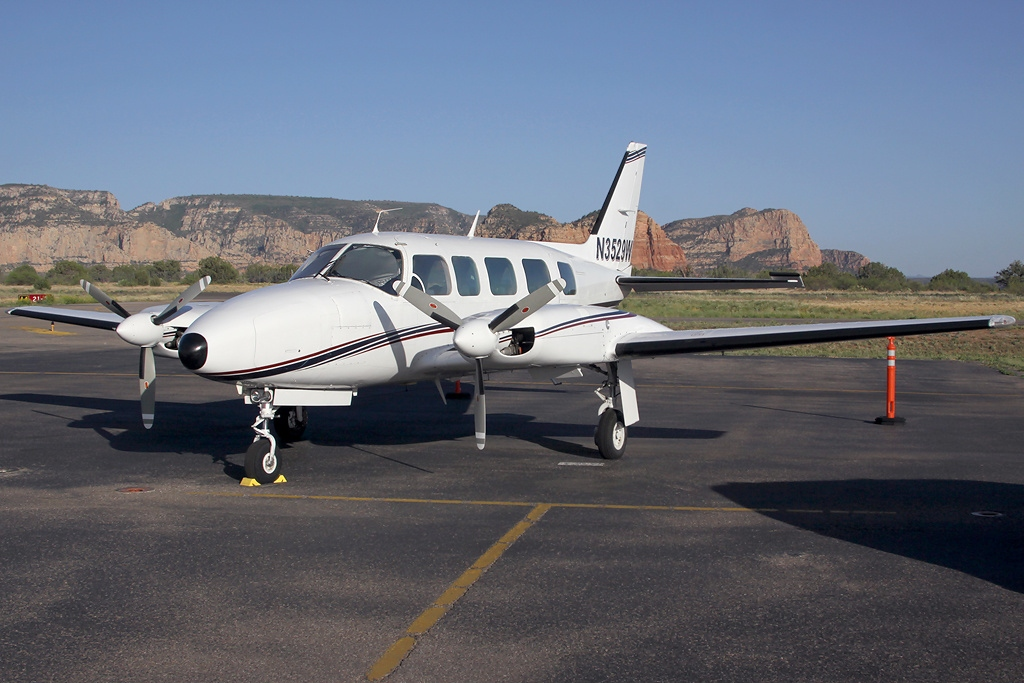
- A Piper PA-31-350 Navajo similar to the accident aircraft

Accident
- Date: 19 October 1984
- Site: 40 km (25 mi) SE of High Prairie, Alberta, Canada; 55°11′37″N 116°00′53″W

Aircraft
- Aircraft type: Piper PA-31 Navajo
- Operator: Wapiti Aviation Ltd.
- Registration: C-GXUC
- Flight origin: Edmonton Municipal Airport, Edmonton, Canada
- 1st stopover: High Prairie Airport, High Prairie, Canada
- Destination: Peace River Airport, Peace River, Canada
- Occupants: 10
- Passengers: 9
- Crew: 1
- Fatalities: 6
- Survivors: 4

Wapiti Aviation Flight 402 was a scheduled passenger flight from Edmonton Municipal Airport to Peace River Airport in Alberta, Canada on 19 October 1984. On approach to their stopover at High Prairie Airport, the plane had a controlled descent into terrain as a result of pilot error, crashing 40 km (25 mi) southeast of the town of High Prairie in a remote area of forest, killing 6 of the 10 people on board. Among the passengers killed was Grant Notley, leader of the Alberta New Democratic Party and father of future premier Rachel Notley.

== Aircraft and crew ==
The aircraft involved in the crash was C-GXUC, a 7-year-old Piper PA-31-350 Chieftain which was manufactured in 1977. The aircraft was operated by Wapiti Aviation Ltd., a regional airline for Northern Alberta based in Grande Prairie which owned and operated 11 other aircraft at the time of the incident. The flight was being flown by 24 year-old rookie pilot Eric Vogel who was working towards his flight timehours, including 118 hours on the Piper Navajo Chieftain. He was the only crew member on board.

== Accident ==
The aircraft arrived at Edmonton Municipal Airport from Grande Prairie Airport at 6:15 PM MST. The pilot was briefed on the weather, and before departing informed passengers that they may not be able to land at their planned stopover in High Prairie due to the weather. He then boarded all passengers, including those bound for High Prairie, and departed 30 minutes behind schedule at 7:10 PM. While climbing, ATC cleared Wapiti Flight 402 to maintain 2,400 m (7,900 ft) before requesting and maintaining 2,600 m (8,500 ft) in order to stay above the clouds due to the pilot's concern of potential icing. While above the Swan Hills NDB, the pilot requested a descent and direct routing to High Prairie Airport. ATC cleared the aircraft to descend to 2,100 m (6,900 ft) and proceed direct to High Prairie. After receiving this clearance and passing the Swan Hills NDB, the pilot began to descend at a rate of 91 m (299 ft) per minute while travelling at 270 km (170 mi) per hour, entering cloud and continuing to descend past the cleared altitude of 2,100 m (6,900 ft) to 868 m (2,848 ft) where, before the pilot planned to level the aircraft it struck the treeline and crashed at 8:04 PM. The pilot had falsely believed that the Swan Hills NDB was located at the summit of the Swan Hills and that he had flown past the area of high terrain. Instead, the NDB was actually located at the Swan Hills Airport, and the terrain continued to rise for a further 30 km (19 mi) in the northwest direction of the plane's intended descent. The plane impacted with both landing gear and flaps up, after striking the trees the right wing was partially torn off before the aircraft landed in a grove of poplars, rolling 90 degrees before coming to a rest in the thick snow. Of the 6 fatalities, four were caused by the upper fuselage's contact with the ground, and two were caused by head and chest trauma resulting from the impact of the crash. Those killed in the crash were Elaine Noskiye, Pat Blakovits, Chris Vince, Gordon Peever, Terry Swanson and Grant Notley.

== Rescue ==
The four men who survived the crash were the pilot Eric Vogel, the Alberta Minister of Housing Larry Shaben, RCMP officer Scott Deschamps, and convict Paul Archambault who was being transported by Deschamps to Grande Prairie for charges of mischief. Archambault, who had been let out of handcuffs by Deschamps during the flight, dug out Deschamps who was trapped suffocating under the snow, an act which would garner him praise in the media and an appearance on the popular Canadian TV show Front Page Challenge. The plane lacked a first aid kit or any survival gear, and was not required to have any, but the survivors started a fire using a lighter. After the plane failed to arrive at High Prairie Airport, it was declared missing at 8:40 PM and a search was started. At 8:56 PM, another aircraft which was flying over reported hearing an ELT signal in the High Prairie area. At 1:25 AM the following day, one of the rescue aircraft located the plane's ELT and dropped flares to help rescuers on the ground locate the crash. Poor weather and visibility continued to delay any potential parachuting from rescue aircraft throughout the morning. At 10:05 AM, rescue and medical personnel were lowered from a Canadian Forces Chinook and made contact with the survivors.

== Aftermath ==
Both a public inquiry and a fatality inquiry were conducted over the accident, attributing the crash to pilot error, with partial blame also placed on Wapiti Aviation's work environment. The crash resulted in the suspension of Wapiti Aviation's license and the grounding of their planes. In May 1986, Wapiti Aviation took the Minister of Transportation to court and the suspension was released. In 1991, the estates of victims of the crash sued the crown for negligence due to their inaction during their surveillance of Wapiti Aviation prior to the crash after multiple complaints of breaching flight regulation. The court found the crown one-third responsible for the accident. The crash and the scrutiny given to the Department of Transportation led to changes in how their surveillance plans are operated. Grant Notley's death, as well as convict Paul Archambault's act of heroism led to the crash receiving national media attention in Canada.
