= Margaret Crang =

Canadian lawyer, teacher, journalist and activist (1910–1992)

Edmonton City Councilor
- In office 1933–1937

Alderman on Edmonton City Council
- In office 1933–1935
- In office 1935–1937

Personal details
- Born: 1910 Strathcona, Alberta
- Died: January 5, 1992 (aged 81–82) Vancouver, British Columbia
- Party: Labour
- Education: University of Alberta
- Profession: Politician, Lawyer, Journalist, and Political Activist

Margaret Tryphena Frances Crang (1910 – January 5 or 6, 1992) was a lawyer, teacher, journalist, and political activist. She served as Edmonton city councillor, 1933-1937 and twice ran for provincial office as a leftist candidate.

Crang's election at the age of 23 in late 1933 makes her the youngest ever to be elected to Edmonton city council. In 1935, she became the first woman to be re-elected onto council and was also appointed deputy mayor under Mayor Joe Clarke. She served two terms on council from 1933 to 1937 under the banner of the Labour Party. During her time in office, Crang advocated for women's rights, labour rights, and against fascism.

Controversy arose in 1936, after Crang attended the World Peace Conference in Brussels as a representative of Alberta's League Against War and Fascism. Crang among others secretly traveled to Spain, which was undergoing the Spanish Civil War. At the front lines near Madrid, Crang "went up to the sandbag barricade and, borrowing a rifle, fired two shots for the government side" (Edmonton Journal).

As well, her candidacy in a 1936 Edmonton by-election in opposition to an official CCF candidate caused her to be banned from the CCF party and damaged her political fortunes. She was not elected after that.

== Personal life ==
=== Early life ===
Crang was born in 1910 in Strathcona, Alberta, at the time a separate city from Edmonton. (Her family at the time were living in a house her father had built on the northwest corner of 83 Avenue and 104 Street.) Her parents were Tryphena Crang and Francis Crang. Frank Crang served as Labour Party school board trustee in Edmonton for 25 years. He inspired Crang's socialist ideologies and her passion for politics.

In her adolescence, Crang was heavily involved in sports and also achieved high academic scores. She attended Garneau School and was tutored by Harry Ainlay, with whom she later served on council.

After graduating from high school during the Depression, Crang obtained three degrees from the University of Alberta: a Bachelors in Arts, Bachelor in Law, and a Diploma in Education. While in university, she took on leadership positions such as secretary for women's athletics.

== Political career ==
=== 1933 municipal campaign ===
Crang said she believed that having a woman on city council would greatly benefit Edmonton. In her campaign, Crang argued that Edmonton women needed representation on council and women had a valuable perspective on food and housing due a their experience in domestic labour.

Other campaign promises including pro-labour actions such as increased wages for civic employees, instituting cash relief payments (instead of food packages) and medical attention for unemployed workers, and providing more services for former soldiers. She also promised to push for appointment of women onto the relief commission, socialized medicine, public ownership of utilities, and to oppose a rise in the five-cent streetcar fare.

=== City Councilor: 1933–1937 ===
In 1933, Margaret Crang was elected to Edmonton's city council at the age of 23, as a Labour Party candidate. Crang received more than 10,000 votes, the second largest vote tally out of 17 council candidates, just behind 62-year old Rice Sheppard. Labour did well in this election, electing four of the five open aldermanic seats. (Because Edmonton used block voting, the leading party could take far more than its due share of seats.) Due to two Labour councillors carrying over from the previous election (staggered terms), Labour held a majority of seats on the 11-seat council after the 1933 election.

Margaret Crang is the youngest person ever to be elected to Edmonton's city council. She was the second woman to be elected to Edmonton's city council and was the first person born in Edmonton to be elected to that body. She was also the only woman to serve on a city council anywhere in Canada at the time, being identified simply as "Woman Alderman" as far away as Winnipeg.

Crang's re-election to council in 1935 made her the first woman to be re-elected to the Edmonton City Council. In this election, she was the most-popular candidate, taking more than 11,000 votes, coming in first place out of all the candidates. (The election at that time was held using a city-wide district where all the aldermanic candidates ran against each other.) During the 1935-1937 term, she served as the youngest deputy mayor in Canadian history under Mayor Joseph Clarke. She was the youngest deputy mayor in Canadian history and one of the first women in Canada to serve in that role.

In 1937, Crang failed to be re-elected to city council. That year all Labour Party candidates failed to be elected, including her father, Francis Crang running for the school board. By the time of the 1937 election Margaret was the sole Labour member on council so with her defeat, the pro-business Citizens Committee held unopposed power.

Edmonton voters turned away from Crang and other Labour candidates due to the city emerging from the Depression. Many of the province's major newspapers were criticizing the Social Credit government. Crang had run as a joint labour-SC candidate in provincial by-elections, and her popularity was hurt by criticism of Aberhart's government.

=== Provincial by-elections ===
Crang ran as candidate in two provincial by-elections. Each time she was not an official CCF candidate, which opened a split between her and that party.

She ran in a June 22, 1936 by-election to fill the seat left empty by the resignation of William R. Howson. But she met with defeat. Liberal candidate Walter Morrish took the seat with a majority of the votes. (Instant-runoff voting was used but as it happened, no votes were transferred as Morrish took a majority of votes on the first count.) No Conservative ran in this by-election so Morrish picked up most of the anti-SC votes, while Crang ran on a united front-style platform of both labour and SC, finding common ground in their respective reforms meant to address the Depression. She had the endorsement of an Alberta Social Credit group and several unemployed organizations. Her former teacher, Harry Ainlay, later mayor of Edmonton, ran under the Co-operative Commonwealth Federation label. Due to her running against him, Margaret and her father were kicked out of the CCF.

Crang ran again in an Edmonton provincial by-election held October 7, 1937. But here too she was unsuccessful. She ran under the Progressive Labour label. Edward Leslie Gray, a Liberal running for the anti-SC "Unity League", took the seat. Like Morrish the previous year, he won with a majority of the votes on the first count.

Later that same year she failed in her re-election bid for her city council seat.

== Spanish Civil War controversy ==
In 1936, Margaret Crang attended the World Peace Conference in Brussels as a representative of Alberta's League Against War and Fascism. More than 5,000 representatives from 32 countries attended this conference. Representatives came from a variety of groups including women's clubs, trade unions, veteran and youth groups. The goal of the conference was to discuss the Spanish Civil War just beginning at that time.

After attending the conference, Crang and others secretly traveled to war-torn Spainr. Crang wanted to see the effects of fascism in Spain and was inspired by the young armed women she saw at the frontlines, the Milicianas. These women, as young as 17 years of age, were fighting to preserve the elected republican government against General Francisco Franco's fascist rebels. To show her support for the elected government and the Milicianas, Crang "went up to the sandbag barricade and, borrowing a rifle, fired two shots for the government side" (Edmonton Journal).

Controversy back home in Canada erupted concerning Crang's action. The Toronto Star, The Edmonton Journal, and The Vancouver Sun carried news of her shot and criticized her involvement in the conflict, in which Canada was formally neutral. The Edmonton Journal had a front-page article, headlined "Ald. Miss Crang Leaves Peace Parley To Fire Shots At Rebels Near Madrid".

The Toronto Star described Crang's actions as hypocritical because she had gone to Europe to attend a peace conference and then fired a gun at the fascist rebels. An article in The Vancouver Sun' summarized Crang's actions as "disloyal to Canada" and "cruel and inhuman," which made her "unwomanly". Some church groups and conservative Canadians also expressed outrage.

Crang later said the incident lead to her losing support although she did not express regret for her action. She later pointed out that she had no enemy soldier in sight and that she "wasted two bullets" rather than "shot two bullets".

== Post-political career ==
After her political defeats in 1937, Crang moved to Montreal to become a journalist for the Montreal Gazette, the same newspaper that had called her a communist after her Spanish Civil War controversy.

Crang continued her legal advocacy after her political career ended. She advocated for the civil rights of Chinese and Sikh immigrants living in Canada.

Crang put forward a motion to allow Rhumah Utendale, a Black nursing student, to study at the Royal Alexandra Hospital. Crang asked the 1938 hospital board to "approve of the principle of admission to the Nurses Training School of girls irrespective of race and color, providing they meet the cultural, educational, and physical requirements". The hospital board rejected the motion, and disallowed Utendale to study at the Royal Alexandra Hospital.

== Health issues ==
Sometime in the 1930s, Crang was diagnosed with Cushing's disease. Due to a medical error, her working adrenal gland was removed, not her faulty one. This would have caused her death if not for hormone treatment. Crang was one of the first people to be cured of Cushing's disease through the use of cortisone.

== Death ==
The exact date of Crang's death is unknown. She died alone in her Vancouver apartment at the age of 82 on January 5 or 6th in 1992.

== Legacy ==
There is no memorial dedicated to the legacy of Margaret Crang in Edmonton. In 2013, there was an approval to name a road and a proposal to name a park in the Edmonton neighborhood of Cavanagh.
