= Elmer Borstad =

Canadian politician

Elmer Elsworth Borstad

Member of the Legislative Assembly of Alberta
- In office March 14, 1979 – November 1, 1982
- Preceded by: Winston Backus
- Succeeded by: Bob Elliot
- Constituency: Grande Prairie

Personal details
- Born: August 27, 1924 Ross Creek near Elk Island National Park, Alberta
- Died: July 18, 2015 (aged 90) Hythe, Alberta
- Party: Progressive Conservative
- Spouse: Doreen Schnieder
- Occupation: Surveyor, sailor, farmer, trucker, business owner

Military service
- Allegiance: Canada
- Branch/service: Royal Canadian Navy Volunteer Reserve
- Unit: HMCS Gatineau and HMCS Sioux

Elmer Elsworth Borstad (August 27, 1924 – July 18, 2015) was a municipal and provincial level politician, surveyor, farmer, sailor and entrepreneur from Alberta, Canada. He served as an alderman and mayor for the city of Grande Prairie, Alberta and later served as a member of the Legislative Assembly of Alberta from 1979 to 1982 sitting with the governing Progressive Conservative caucus.

== Early life ==
Elmer Elsworth Borstad was born on a farm in the Ross Creek area near Elk Island National Park, Alberta in 1924. His first job was working as a caretaker for the nearby school. After short term employment in a sawmill in Chipman, Alberta he went north to work as a surveyor on the CANOL pipeline during the winter of 1941. In 1942 he joined the Royal Canadian Navy Volunteer Reserve, RCNVR and was based in Halifax where he operated small harbour patrol craft until VE Day. Following the end of the war in Europe, he was posted to Victoria, where he saw active duty on HMCS Gatineau and HMCS Sioux until 1945.

After the war Borstad moved to Grande Prairie and became a surveyor until 1953 when he helped found a trucking business with his father Cloff and brother Roy. The Borstads started a welding supply business in 1972. Both were eventually sold, the Cartage company to the employees and the welding supply company to Union Carbide. He served as president of the Grande Prairie Chamber of commerce in 1979.

== Political career ==
Borstad began his political and public service career on the municipal level serving on the police and economic development commissions for the city of Grande Prairie, Alberta. Borstad was elected as an alderman for the first time in 1963 and he became mayor of the city in 1968.

Borstad was also active in provincial politics. He joined the Progressive Conservatives and became president of the Grande Prairie electoral district. Borstad ran for a seat to the provincial legislature in the 1979 Alberta general election. He won a large majority to hold the district for the Progressive Conservatives. He retired from provincial politics and decided to return to his family business after the legislature dissolved in 1982.

== Late life ==
After leaving provincial politics Borstad worked until 1985 before moving to British Columbia to retire. He returned to Grande Prairie in 1995 and continued his public service by becoming chairman of the QEII Hospital foundation where he successfully campaigned and raised funds for an MRI Machine. He also worked as a fundraiser for Grande Prairie Regional College and was awarded the Alumni/Foundation Volunteer Award by the college in 2004 for his half century of service to the city. He served on the 50th Anniversary Committee for the city in 2008. He died on July 18, 2015, at the age of 90.
