= Winston Backus =

Canadian politician (1920–2020)

Winston O. Backus

Member of the Legislative Assembly of Alberta
- In office 1971–1979
- Preceded by: Ira McLaughlin
- Succeeded by: Elmer Borstad
- Constituency: Grande Prairie

Minister of Public Works
- In office September 10, 1971 – March 1975
- Preceded by: Albert Ludwig
- Succeeded by: William Yurko

Personal details
- Born: Winston Osler Backus; October 12, 1920 Eckville, Alberta, Canada
- Died: June 15, 2020 (aged 99) Spruce Grove, Alberta, Canada
- Party: Progressive Conservative
- Spouse(s): Valmai Rubena Hughes; Myrtle Ruth Loewen (m.1971)
- Children: David, Richard, Robert, Elizabeth; step-children: Reid, Wayne, Donald, Myrna
- Education: University of London
- Occupation: doctor, surgeon

Winston Osler Backus (October 12, 1920 – June 15, 2020) was a Canadian politician. He served in the Legislative Assembly of Alberta from 1971 to 1979, and he served as Minister of Public Works in the cabinet of Premier Peter Lougheed from 1971 to 1975. The son of Percy Lavern and Verna Henrietta Backus, he was born in Eckville, Alberta in 1920. He died in June 2020 at the age of 99.

== Political career ==
Backus ran for a seat to the Alberta Legislature in the 1971 Alberta general election. He defeated Social Credit candidate William Bowes by a few hundred votes in the electoral district of Grande Prairie to pick up the district for the Progressive Conservatives. After the election Premier Peter Lougheed appointed Backus Minister of Public Works in his first cabinet. In the 1975 general election he was returned to office with a landslide victory over three other candidates. Backus was left out of cabinet after the 1975 election. He served out the rest of his term as a private member and retired at dissolution of the assembly in 1979.
