= Adolph Fimrite =

Canadian politician (1913–1990)

Adolph Olaf Fimrite

Member of the Legislative Assembly of Alberta
- Preceded by: Henry DeBolt
- Succeeded by: District abolished
- Constituency: Spirit River

Minister without Portfolio
- In office December 12, 1968 – September 10, 1971
- Premier: Harry Strom

Personal details
- Born: February 16, 1913 Kingman, Alberta, Canada
- Died: July 18, 1990 (aged 77)
- Party: Social Credit
- Occupation: politician

Adolph Olaf Fimrite (February 16, 1913 – July 18, 1990) was a provincial politician from Alberta, Canada. He served as a member of the Legislative Assembly of Alberta from 1952 to 1971 sitting with the Social Credit caucus in government. During his time in office he served as a cabinet minister in the government of Premier Harry Strom from 1968 to 1971. He grew up in an impoverished, fatherless family homesteading in the North country. During the 1960s, his sister, Olive Stickney (Fimrite), was the first and for eight years the only, woman to be elected as councillor of a rural municipality.

== Political career ==
Fimrite ran for a seat for the first time in the 1952 Alberta general election as a Social Credit candidate. He won the electoral district of Spirit River in a hotly contested race on vote transfers to hold it for the Social Credit party.

Fimrite ran for a second term in office in the 1955 Alberta general election. He defeated two other candidates and was able to win over half the popular vote in his district.

Fimrite increased his majority running for his third term in office in the 1959 Alberta general election. He faced three other candidates and tripled the vote of runner up Progressive Conservative candidate Charles Stojan.

The 1963 general election saw Fimrite win the largest majority of his career. He defeated two other candidates and won the district with nearly 70 percent of the popular vote.

Fimrite ran for a fifth term in the 1967 general election. NDP candidate Bert Strand made a strong bid to defeat Fimrite, but Fimrite won a comfortable majority to hold the seat.

A year after the election Harry Strom was chosen as Premier. Strom invited Fimrite into his cabinet on December 12, 1968, as a Minister without Portfolio. He held that position until the end of his political career.

Due to boundary redistribution the electoral district of Spirit River became Spirit River-Fairview. Fimrite ran for re-election in the new district in the 1971 Alberta general election. He was defeated by NDP leader Grant Notley.
