= Ira McLaughlin =

Canadian politician

Member of the Legislative Assembly of Alberta
- In office July 8, 1944 – August 30, 1971
- Preceded by: Lewis O'Brien
- Succeeded by: Winston Backus
- Constituency: Grande Prairie

Minister without Portfolio
- In office November 30, 1962 – December 12, 1968
- Premier: Ernest Manning

Personal details
- Born: January 5, 1891 Charlottetown, Prince Edward Island
- Died: January 8, 1974 (aged 83) Grande Prairie, Alberta
- Party: Social Credit
- Occupation: politician

Ira McLaughlin (January 5, 1891 – January 8, 1974) was a provincial politician from Alberta, Canada. He served as a member of the Legislative Assembly of Alberta from 1944 to 1971 sitting with the Social Credit caucus in government. During his time in office he served as a cabinet minister in the government of Ernest Manning from 1962 to 1968..

== Early life ==
Ira McLaughlin was born in Prince Edward Island on January 5, 1891. At the age of 19 in 1910 he moved to Saskatchewan and then later settled in the town of Bezanson in the Grande Prairie area in 1928.

== Political career ==
McLaughlin ran for a seat to the Alberta Legislature as a Social Credit candidate in the 1944 Alberta general election. He won the electoral district of Grande Prairie with a solid majority to pick it up for his party.

He won a larger majority running for his second term in the 1948 general election. In that race he defeated two other candidates to hold his seat.

McLaughlin ran for his third term in office in the 1952 general election. He held his vote to win the district while the two opposition candidates saw their support fall. He ran for a fourth term in office in the 1955 general election. He defeated three other candidates while increasing his popular support.

McLaughlin ran for a fifth term in the 1959 general election. His popularity kept increasing as he took the district with a margin of 65%.

Premier Ernest Manning appointed McLaughlin to his cabinet as a Minister-without-portfolio on November 30, 1962. He went into the 1963 general election with ministerial advantage and was returned to power with another large majority.

McLaughlin stood for his seventh and final term in the 1967 general election. He won the highest popular vote of his career easily winning over two other candidates.

Social Credit chose a new leader on December 12, 1968. Premier Harry Strom did not invite McLaughlin back into cabinet. He retired from the legislature at dissolution in 1971.
