= Nolan Dyck =

Canadian politician from Alberta

Nolan Dyck MLA

Member of the Legislative Assembly of Alberta for Grande Prairie
- Incumbent
- Assumed office May 29, 2023
- Preceded by: Tracy Allard

Personal details
- Party: UCP
- Education: Peace River Bible Institute

Nolan Dyck is a Canadian politician from the United Conservative Party. He was elected as a Member of the Legislative Assembly of Alberta for Grande Prairie in the 2023 Alberta general election.

== Electoral history ==
=== 2023 general election ===
2023 Alberta general election: Grande Prairie
Party	Candidate	Votes	%	±%
United Conservative	Nolan Dyck	10,001	63.94	+0.92
New Democratic	Kevin McLean	4,890	31.26	+9.65
Alberta Independence	David Braun	348	2.22	+1.60
Alberta Party	Preston Mildenberger	242	1.55	-10.92
Green	Shane Diederich	160	1.02	–
Total		15,641	99.55	–
Rejected and declined		71	0.45	
Turnout		15,712	48.70	
Eligible voters		32,263		
United Conservative hold		Swing		-4.36
Source(s) Source: Elections Alberta

=== 2023 UCP Grande Prairie nomination contest ===
April 3, 2023

Candidate	Round 1		Round 2	
Candidate	Votes	%	Votes	%
Nolan Dyck	278	46.6	296	51.3
Tayyab Parvez	184	30.8	190	32.9
Gladys Blackmore	79	13.2	91	15.8
Larry Gibson	56	9.4	Eliminated	
Total	597	100.00	577	100.00
