= Lewis O'Brien (politician) =

Canadian politician

Member of the Legislative Assembly of Alberta
- In office March 21, 1940 – August 7, 1944
- Preceded by: William Sharpe
- Succeeded by: Ira McLaughlin
- Constituency: Grande Prairie

Personal details
- Born: November 28, 1868 Laskay, Ontario
- Died: June 14, 1955 (aged 86) Edmonton, Alberta
- Party: Unity Movement
- Spouse: Alice O'Brien
- Education: University of Toronto (B.A.); University of Würzburg (M.D.)
- Occupation: Physician, surgeon

Military service
- Allegiance: Canada
- Branch/service: Canadian Army Medical Corps
- Years of service: 1915–1918
- Rank: Captain
- Battles/wars: World War I

Lewis James O'Brien (November 28, 1868 – June 14, 1955) was a provincial level politician and medical doctor from Alberta, Canada. He served as a member of the Legislative Assembly of Alberta from 1940 to 1944.

== Early life ==
Lewis James O'Brien was born November 28, 1868, in Laskay, Ontario. He was educated in Toronto, served as a teacher, then returned to the University of Toronto where he completed his Bachelor of Arts in 1897. He obtained his Doctor of Medicine after enrolling at the University of Würzburg in Germany three years later. O'Brien remained in Germany and Austria for two years before moving back to Ontario to set up his medical practice and marry Alice John. During the First World War he served overseas with the Canadian Army Medical Corps at the 5th Canadian Hospital in Liverpool. O'Brien moved to the Peace Region after the war in 1918.

== Political career ==
O'Brien ran as an Independent candidate under the Unity Movement in the 1940 Alberta general election. He defeated Social Credit incumbent MLA William Sharpe on the second count to win the Grande Prairie electoral district. O'Brien served a single term in the Assembly before announcing that he wanted to step off to the side lines and retire at a nomination convention held in the Capital Theater at Grande Prairie, Alberta on February 3, 1944.

== Honours ==
O'Brien Provincial Park located 15 km (9.3 mi) south from Grande Prairie, on Highway 666 is named in O'Brien's honour.

Legislative Assembly of Alberta
Preceded by William Sharpe	MLA Grande Prairie; 1940-1944	Succeeded by Ira McLaughlin
