= Bob Elliott (politician) =

Canadian politician (1927–2013)

C. Bob Elliott

MLA for Grande Prairie
- In office 1982–1993
- Preceded by: Elmer Borstad
- Succeeded by: District Abolished

Personal details
- Born: Charles Robert Elliott; October 15, 1927 Edmonton, Alberta
- Died: October 14, 2013 (aged 85) Richmond, British Columbia
- Party: Progressive Conservative

Charles Robert "Bob" Elliott (October 15, 1927 – October 14, 2013) was a municipal and provincial level politician from Alberta, Canada. He served as a member of the Legislative Assembly of Alberta from 1982 to 1993 sitting with the governing Progressive Conservative caucus.

== Science career ==
Although born in Edmonton, Elliott grew up in Busby, Alberta.

He studied agriculture at the Vermillion School of Agriculture, now Lakeland College, and then at the University of Alberta. After completing his studies with a Ph.D. at the University of Saskatchewan, he began work at the Beaverlodge Research Station. There he developed a new variety of Creeping Red Fescue, a grass that he named Boreal in tribute to the North. He also developed two varieties of clover.

== Political career ==
Bob Elliott served as Mayor of Beaverlodge, Alberta, from 1971 to 1977.

Elliott ran for a seat to the Alberta Legislature for the first time in the 1982 Alberta general election. He won the Grande Prairie electoral district easily, defeating five other candidates to hold it for the governing Progressive Conservatives. Elliot was re-elected to his second term in the 1986 Alberta general election. His majority of votes was reduced, but he still won a solid majority defeating three other candidates.

He ran for his final term in the 1989 Alberta general election. His popular vote would again drop but he still won well over 50 per cent of the vote. During his time in office, he worked to extend Highway 40 from Grande Prairie to Grande Cache, and for funding for hospitals in the smaller centres in his constituency.

== Personal life ==
Elliott had many hobbies and interests, including playing clarinet and drawing. He was married to his wife Beryl for 58 years, and they have a daughter Marjorie, and two grandchildren Harley and Shelby.

He died in Richmond, British Columbia, one day before his 86th birthday, in 2013.
