= Henry DeBolt =

Canadian politician

Member of the Legislative Assembly of Alberta
- In office 1940–1952
- Preceded by: none
- Succeeded by: Adolph Fimrite
- Constituency: Spirit River

Personal details
- Born: October 2, 1888 Potlatch, Idaho, U.S.
- Died: March 8, 1969 (aged 80) DeBolt, Alberta, Canada
- Party: Social Credit Party of Alberta
- Spouse: Laura May Bickell
- Children: seven

Henry Elbert DeBolt (October 2, 1888 – March 8, 1969) was a provincial politician from Alberta, Canada. He served as a member of the Legislative Assembly of Alberta from 1940 to 1952, sitting as a Social Credit member from the constituency of Spirit River. The Alberta community of DeBolt is named after him.
