= Hugh John Macdonald (Edmonton politician) =

Canadian politician

Hugh John Macdonald KC

Member of the Legislative Assembly of Alberta
- In office March 21, 1940 – August 7, 1944 Serving with Ernest Manning, J. Percy Page, Norman B. James, David Duggan
- Constituency: Edmonton

Justice of the Supreme Court of Alberta, Appellate Division
- In office January 17, 1957 – March 2, 1965

Justice of the Supreme Court of Alberta, Trial Division
- In office October 20, 1944 – January 17, 1957

Personal details
- Born: November 11, 1898 South Hanson, Massachusetts
- Died: March 2, 1965 (aged 66) Edmonton, Alberta, Canada
- Party: None (Independent)
- Education: University of Alberta
- Occupation: judge, lawyer

Hugh John Macdonald KC (November 11, 1898 – March 2, 1965) was a Canadian provincial politician and judge from Alberta. He served as a member of the Legislative Assembly of Alberta from 1940 to 1944, sitting as a member of the anti-Social Credit Unity League (a.k.a., the Independent Citizens' Association) for the constituency of Edmonton. Macdonald served on the Edmonton City Council for six years and was a judge and lawyer.

== Early life ==
Hugh John Macdonald was born in South Hanson, Massachusetts on November 11, 1898, to a Canadian father from Cape Breton. In his youth the family moved to Edmonton, where he eventually studied at the University of Alberta, earning a Bachelor of Arts in 1921 and Bachelor of Laws in 1923. Macdonald served in the United States Army during the First World War and returned to Alberta, where he served as the principal of the Banff public and high school from 1923 to 1927. After 1927, Macdonald returned to Edmonton to work as a solicitor for Wood, Buchanan & Macdonald, developing significant experience in insurance law.

== Judicial career ==
On October 20, 1944, Macdonald was appointed to the Supreme Court of Alberta, Trial Division in Edmonton. He was elevated on January 17, 1957, to the Supreme Court of Alberta, Appellate Division.

Macdonald took a strong interest in the University of Alberta, serving in the Senate and on the Board of Governors and as president of the Alumni Association, as well as holding an honorary degree.

Macdonald died while serving on the bench on March 2, 1965.
