= William Sharpe (Alberta politician) =

Canadian politician

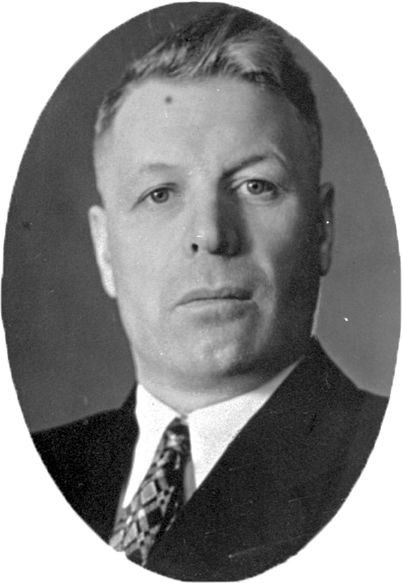

Member of the Legislative Assembly of Alberta
- In office 1935–1940
- Preceded by: Hugh Allen
- Succeeded by: Lewis O'Brien
- Constituency: Grande Prairie

Personal details
- Born: September 22, 1887 Sundridge, Ontario
- Died: November 24, 1964 (aged 77) Grande Prairie, Alberta
- Party: Social Credit

William Sharpe (September 22, 1887 – November 24, 1964) was a provincial politician from Alberta, Canada. He served as a member of the Legislative Assembly of Alberta from 1935 to 1940, sitting with the Social Credit caucus in government. He served as MLA for Grande Prairie.

The Alternative Voting (Instant runoff voting) system was in use to ensure majority representation. No candidate received majority of the votes in the first count in the 1935 Grande Prairie contest. Elimination of the Conservative and UFA candidates exhausted many votes as back-up preferences were not marked by many voters. On the third count Sharpe received a majority of votes still in play, maintaining his lead over the Liberal candidate's vote tally.
