= Grant Notley =

Canadian politician (1939–1984)

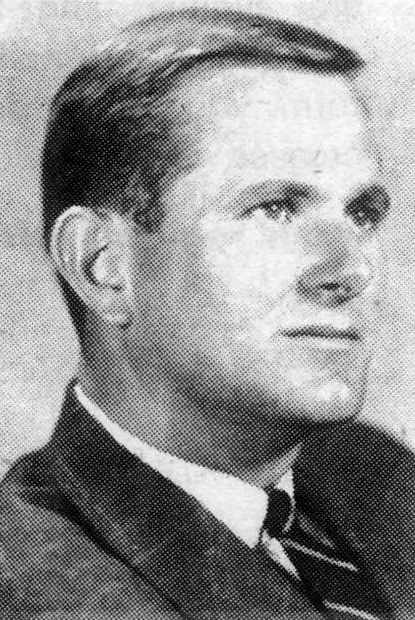
- Notley c. 1969

Leader of the Opposition in Alberta
- In office November 2, 1982 – October 19, 1984
- Preceded by: Raymond Speaker
- Succeeded by: Ray Martin

Leader of the Alberta New Democratic Party
- In office November 10, 1968 – October 19, 1984
- Preceded by: Neil Reimer
- Succeeded by: Ray Martin

Member of the Legislative Assembly of Alberta for Spirit River-Fairview
- In office August 30, 1971 – October 19, 1984
- Preceded by: Riding established
- Succeeded by: Jim Gurnett (1985)

Personal details
- Born: Walter Grant Notley; January 19, 1939 Didsbury, Alberta, Canada
- Died: October 19, 1984 (aged 45) near High Prairie, Alberta, Canada
- Cause of death: Plane crash
- Party: New Democratic
- Children: Rachel, Paul and Stephen
- Education: University of Alberta (BA)
- Occupation: Politician

Walter Grant Notley (January 19, 1939 – October 19, 1984) was a Canadian politician. He served as a member of the Legislative Assembly of Alberta from 1971 to 1984 and also served as leader of the Alberta NDP from 1968 to 1984.

== Early life ==
Notley was born in Didsbury, Alberta, the son of Frances (Grant) and James Walter Notley, who were farmers. He graduated from the University of Alberta in 1960 with a history degree. After having been involved with the Alberta New Democratic Party in campus politics, he became the party's provincial secretary in 1962.

== Political career ==
Notley ran for a seat to the Alberta Legislature for the first time in the 1963 Alberta general election as a candidate for the Alberta NDP in the Edmonton-North West district. He was unsuccessful, finishing last in the four-way race (incumbent Social Credit MLA Edgar Gerhart was re-elected).

He ran in the 1967 provincial election in the new Edmonton-Norwood district, coming in second, and in a 1969 by-election in Edson.

Notley was elected leader of the Alberta NDP in 1968.

Notley was finally successful in the 1971 provincial election. He won a seat in the Legislative Assembly of Alberta when he ran in Spirit River-Fairview, defeating incumbent Social Credit MLA Adolph Fimrite. He was repeatedly re-elected and served as the Member of the Legislative Assembly (MLA) for Spirit River-Fairview until his death. During that time, he was, for eleven years. the sole NDP MLA in the provincial legislature although the party consistently received more than ten percent of the vote time after time.

In the 1982 provincial election, Notley was joined in the Legislature by Ray Martin, elected as an NDP MLA in Edmonton Norwood. The NDP was named the official opposition, as Notley, Martin and two independents were the only non-Progressive Conservative MLAs elected.

== Death ==
On October 19, 1984, Notley and five other passengers were killed near Slave Lake in northern Alberta when Wapiti Aviation Flight 402 crashed into a snow-covered, wooded hillside. Four people survived the crash, including then Minister of Housing, Larry Shaben.

A year after Notley's death, his party achieved a breakthrough. In the 1986 provincial election, the NDP, for the first time, won 16 seats and 29 percent of the vote.

== Personal life ==
Notley's daughter, Rachel Notley, served as MLA (NDP) for the provincial riding of Edmonton Strathcona, from the 2008 provincial election to 2024. She became leader of the party on October 18, 2014, as her father had before her, and she served as premier of Alberta, from May 24, 2015, to April 30, 2019. She stepped down as Leader of NDP in January 2024.

One of his two sons, Stephen Notley, writes the popular newspaper and web comic strip Bob the Angry Flower. His other son is Paul Notley.

== Legacy ==
In 2010, the Peace River farm district Dunvegan-Central Peace provincial riding was renamed Dunvegan-Central Peace-Notley. Notley had represented the area as MLA from 1971 to his death in 1984.

A statue was erected in his honour in Edmonton's Grant Notley Park, near Lemarchand Mansion, 100th Avenue and 116 Street.

Socialism and Democracy: Essays in Honour of Grant Notley was published after his death.

The biography Grant Notley The Social Conscience of Alberta by Howard A. Leeson was published by UofA Press in 1992, reprinted 2015.
