= People's League (Alberta) =

The People's League (AKA Independent Citizen's Association) was a political organization in Alberta, Canada in the 1930s and 1940s. It was a coalition of groups opposed to Alberta's governing Social Credit League, primarily the Alberta Liberal Party and the Conservative Party of Alberta.

Its candidates ran as "Independents" in the 1940 and 1944 elections and had some success. J. Percy Page and H. B. Macdonald were elected among the group's MLAs.
