= Independent Citizen's Association =

The Alberta Unity Movement, also known as the Independent Movement and later the Independent Citizen's Association, the People's League, was a political movement and lobby group in Alberta, Canada formed in 1937 in an attempt to unite the opposition against the Social Credit government of William Aberhart. It was created as a lobby group to promote independent candidates before the 1940 general election. The Conservative and Liberal parties, and the more conservative remnants of the United Farmers, recognizing the widespread popularity of the Social Credit party, ran joint candidates as independents in what was called the "Independent Movement" or the "Unity Movement". Calgary mayor Andrew Davison was named leader.

At the 1940 election, Independent candidates won 42 per cent of the vote, only 1,400 fewer votes than Social Credit. However, not all these were anti-SC activists belonging to the AUM/ICA. Some were actual independent candidates running under their own steam.

Be that as it may, the Independent Movement did have considerable support and did elect 19 MLAs. The "party" might have done better but for their support being spread out across the province and not concentrated enough in specific districts to translate into seats, especially outside the cities. (In the cities the STV-PR system in use ensured they would receive their fair portion of city seats.) In some rural districts, Independents lost races to Socred incumbents by small margins, despite the AV system in use in rural districts in those days.

And Social Credit was returned for a second term. The Independents did, however, succeed in slashing Social Credit's previous crushing majority; the Socreds won only 36 seats, down from 56 when the writs were dropped. Independent candidates won 19 seats, enough to make Davison Leader of the Official Opposition.

The Liberal Party under leader Edward Gray chose only to support Independent candidates that it played a hand in nominating and it nominated other candidates under its own banner, one of whom was elected to a seat. Gray felt that candidates should not be 'machined' into the field and left it up to individual Liberal constituency associations to support Unity Movement candidates or to put forward their own Liberal candidates.

Many former supporters of the United Farmers joined the Co-operative Commonwealth Federation which ran its own candidates, none of whom were elected. A Labor candidate A.J. Morrison was elected in the coal-mining area of Edson.

The campaign ads for the Independents typically read: "Be Independent of the new "Social Order". Vote Independent! Paid for by the Independent Citizen's Association of Alberta."

In 1944, James H. Walker, an Independent MLA who had been a United Farmers candidate, was elected the first permanent leader of the Independents over David Elton. Strains within the coalition had begun to take their toll with Liberal MLAs leaving the caucus before the beginning of that year's legislative session. The Liberals chose not to run separately in the general election, however, and Walker led the Independents into the 1944 provincial election but the party failed to run a full slate of candidates. Only three Independent MLAs were elected - Page in Edmonton; Davison and H.B. Macdonald in Calgary. Walker lost his own seat in the Warner district.

In 1945, the Independents chose J. Percy Page as their leader and he became Leader of the Opposition. He led the party, now called the Independent Citizen's Association, into the 1948 election. However, by that time, the Liberals had left the coalition and ran their own slate of candidates. The party received only 1.35% of the vote, losing all of its seats. The party folded, and the Conservative Party re-emerged in the 1950s.
