= Canadian federal election results in Edmonton and environs =

Seats obtained by party

Conservative
New Democratic
Liberal
Alliance (defunct)
Progressive Conservative (defunct)
Reform (defunct)
Social Credit (defunct)

This page shows results of Canadian federal elections in Edmonton and the surrounding area.

== Regional profile ==
=== Evolution through time ===
Edmonton has been historically more conservative than most other large cities in Canada. Since 1958, Conservatives have won more of the seats here than any other party, although in most cases with smaller pluralities than the astronomical margins in rural Alberta. Social Credit, at first a radical movement but by the 1940s morphing into a conservative-style party, took several seats in Edmonton between 1935 and 1958. From 1972 to 1988, Conservatives won every Edmonton seat, although occasionally with less than half the votes in the district. (Note: A Conservative won the Edmonton Strathcona seat four times with less than half of the votes during that period - in 1962 with just a bit more than a third of the votes.)

==== 1980s-1990s ====
From 1935 to 2008, the CCF/NDP won only one seat in Edmonton (the only one in all of Alberta), despite taking as much as 18% of the province-wide federal vote. The NDP won an Alberta seat in 1988 when Ross Harvey won Edmonton East. They also came within 274 votes to win the April 1986 Pembina by-election, the seat was narrowly retained by the Progressive Conservatives.

The Progressive Conservatives managed to win 7 seats (out of 8) in the area in 1988 despite a significant decline in support.

Both the PC and the NDP were swept out in 1993 in favor of the Liberals and the Reform Party. The gap in votes between the Reform Party and the Liberals increased in subsequent elections, allowing the Reform Party and its successors to win a majority of the seats in the region but the Liberal vote share would exceed the 30% mark up to the 2004 election.

==== 2000s-2020s ====
In 2006, the Conservatives again achieved a total sweep of Alberta, repeating their 1958-1988 shut-outs, but this was broken by the New Democratic Party in Edmonton-Strathcona in 2008. The NDP has held this seat every election since, including the 2011. In 2011, the NDP finished second in all the other Edmonton-area ridings except Edmonton-Sherwood Park (where it came in third behind the Conservative winner and an independent candidate).

In 2015, the Liberals took two ridings, the NDP retained Edmonton Strathcona, and the Tories held the remainder. In 2019, Conservatives took all the Edmonton ridings except Edmonton Strathcona, which remained in NDP hands as the only non-Tory riding in Alberta. The Conservatives' dominance in the Edmonton representation was achieved despite Conservative candidates taking a combined 55 percent of the city vote. The near-total NDP shut-out was achieved despite the NDP taking 20 percent of the city vote. In 2021, the Liberals regained Edmonton Centre from the Conservatives and the NDP gained Edmonton Griesbach, while retaining Edmonton Strathcona. The Conservatives held the remaining ridings.

=== Political geography ===
Edmonton is far friendlier to centre-left parties than the rest of Alberta. It is the current base of the provincial NDP. The NDP scored an upset victory in the 2015 provincial election in part by taking all of Edmonton, and held all but one Edmonton seat even as it lost its majority dominance in the Legislature in 2019.

Edmonton is the only part of Alberta where the federal Liberals have consistently broken through in recent times (since 1993). It held two to four seats here from 1993 to 2006, although never winning by large margins. The Liberals lost all their Edmonton seats in 2006, but won more in 2015 before losing them again in 2021. The four seats the Liberals won in 1993 were the first they had won anywhere in Alberta since 1968.

The safest Tory seats are located in the more suburban ridings outside of the city core. From 2004 to 2011, their best riding in the region was Edmonton—Spruce Grove, most of which is now Edmonton West. In 2011, for instance, the Conservatives won 71% of the vote there. They also won more than 60% of the vote in Edmonton—St. Albert, Edmonton—Leduc and Edmonton—Mill Woods—Beaumont.

Liberals, on the other hand, have recently had most of their success in the downtown ridings, not in the suburbs. Liberals won seats in 2015 and 2019. One of the Liberal victories in 2015 was in Edmonton Centre.

The NDP, both provincially and federally, has had proven popularity in the university-oriented and culturally-diverse area of Old Strathcona, and recently has come in second or better in almost all the ridings in the Edmonton area.

=== Votes by party throughout time ===
Election	Liberal	Conservative	New Democratic	Green	People's	PC	Reform / Alliance	Others
1979	69,303; 27.3%	—N/a	31,157; 12.3%	—N/a	—N/a	152,605; 60.1%	—N/a	782; 0.3%
1980	60,376; 26.6%	—N/a	28,625; 12.6%	—N/a	—N/a	135,261; 59.6%	—N/a	2,575; 1.1%
1984	47,973; 16.1%	—N/a	57,606; 19.4%	1,528; 0.5%	—N/a	181,205; 61.0%	—N/a	8,895; 3.0%
1988	64,051; 17.5%	—N/a	92,693; 25.4%	343; 0.1%	—N/a	159,003; 43.5%	44,262; 12.1%	5,031; 1.4%
1993	131,342; 35.1%	—N/a	22,454; 6.0%	725; 0.2%	—N/a	40,552; 10.8%	160,451; 42.9%	18,522; 5.0%
1997	109,932; 33.8%	—N/a	28,814; 8.9%	827; 0.3%	—N/a	28,337; 8.7%	155,133; 47.7%	2,515; 0.8%
2000	131,161; 33.4%	—N/a	31,983; 8.1%	462; 0.1%	—N/a	33,255; 8.5%	193,603; 49.2%	2,680; 0.7%
2004	119,481; 31.1%	192,591; 50.2%	46,981; 12.2%	22,246; 5.8%	—N/a	—N/a	—N/a	2,559; 0.7%
2006	94,810; 21.9%	242,418; 55.9%	69,099; 15.9%	25,251; 5.8%	—N/a	—N/a	—N/a	1,961; 0.5%
2008	57,576; 15.0%	207,531; 54.2%	73,635; 19.2%	27,446; 7.2%	—N/a	—N/a	—N/a	16,467; 4.3%
2011	43,331; 10.4%	234,006; 56.1%	106,901; 25.6%	14,967; 3.6%	—N/a	—N/a	—N/a	17,713; 4.2%
2015	163,036; 26.2%	310,521; 49.9%	114,512; 18.4%	14,236; 2.3%	—N/a	—N/a	—N/a	20,243; 3.3%
2019	122,969; 18.1%	404,854; 59.7%	118,950; 17.5%	15,787; 2.3%	12,706; 1.9%	—N/a	—N/a	3,127; 0.5%
2021	117,365; 18.3%	294,844; 45.9%	180,561; 28.1%	2,633; 0.4%	41,907; 6.5%	—N/a	—N/a	4,834; 0.8%

Vote share by party

Liberal
Conservative
New Democratic
Green
People's
Reform (defunct)
Alliance (defunct)
Progressive Conservative (defunct)

== 2015 ==
Electoral district	Candidates						Incumbent
Electoral district	Conservative	NDP	Liberal	Green	Libertarian	Other	Incumbent
Edmonton Centre	James Cumming; 18,703; 34.95%	Gil McGowan; 13,084; 24.45%	Randy Boissonnault; 19,902; 37.19%	David Parker; 1,403; 2.62%		Steven Stauffer (Rhino.); 257 0.48%	Laurie Hawn†
Edmonton Centre	James Cumming; 18,703; 34.95%	Gil McGowan; 13,084; 24.45%	Randy Boissonnault; 19,902; 37.19%	David Parker; 1,403; 2.62%		Kat Yaki (Ind.); 163 0.30%	Laurie Hawn†
Edmonton Griesbach	Kerry Diotte; 19,157; 39.96%	Janis Irwin; 16,309; 34.02%	Brian Gold; 10,397; 21.69%	Heather Workman; 1,129; 2.35%	Maryna Goncharenko; 415; 0.87%	Mary Joyce (M-L); 112 0.23%	Peter Goldring†; Edmonton East
Edmonton Griesbach	Kerry Diotte; 19,157; 39.96%	Janis Irwin; 16,309; 34.02%	Brian Gold; 10,397; 21.69%	Heather Workman; 1,129; 2.35%	Maryna Goncharenko; 415; 0.87%	Linda Northcott (Mar.); 279 0.58%	Peter Goldring†; Edmonton East
Edmonton Griesbach	Kerry Diotte; 19,157; 39.96%	Janis Irwin; 16,309; 34.02%	Brian Gold; 10,397; 21.69%	Heather Workman; 1,129; 2.35%	Maryna Goncharenko; 415; 0.87%	Bun Bun Thompson (Rhino.); 144 0.30%	Peter Goldring†; Edmonton East
Edmonton Manning	Ziad Aboultaif; 22,166; 45.24%	Aaron Paquette; 11,582; 23.64%	Sukhdev Aujla; 13,509; 27.57%	Chris Vallee; 1,079; 2.20%		Mebreate Deres (Ind.); 540 1.10%	New District
Edmonton Manning	Ziad Aboultaif; 22,166; 45.24%	Aaron Paquette; 11,582; 23.64%	Sukhdev Aujla; 13,509; 27.57%	Chris Vallee; 1,079; 2.20%		André Vachon (M-L); 125 0.26%	New District
Edmonton Mill Woods (judicial recount)	Tim Uppal; 20,331; 41.06%	Jasvir Deol; 6,330; 12.78%	Amarjeet Sohi; 20,423; 41.24%	Ralph McLean; 1,096; 2.21%	Allen K.W. Paley; 396; 0.80%	Peter Downing (CHP); 285 0.58%	Mike Lake‡ Edmonton—Mill Woods—Beaumont
Edmonton Mill Woods (judicial recount)	Tim Uppal; 20,331; 41.06%	Jasvir Deol; 6,330; 12.78%	Amarjeet Sohi; 20,423; 41.24%	Ralph McLean; 1,096; 2.21%	Allen K.W. Paley; 396; 0.80%	Naomi Rankin (Comm.); 96 0.19%	Mike Lake‡ Edmonton—Mill Woods—Beaumont
Edmonton Mill Woods (judicial recount)	Tim Uppal; 20,331; 41.06%	Jasvir Deol; 6,330; 12.78%	Amarjeet Sohi; 20,423; 41.24%	Ralph McLean; 1,096; 2.21%	Allen K.W. Paley; 396; 0.80%	Colin Stubbs (Ind.); 560 1.13%	Mike Lake‡ Edmonton—Mill Woods—Beaumont
Edmonton Riverbend	Matt Jeneroux; 28,805; 49.89%	Brian Fleck; 9,846; 17.05%	Tariq Chaudary; 17,428; 30.18%	Valerie Kennedy; 1,275; 2.21%	Steven Lack; 386; 0.67%		James Rajotte†; Edmonton—Leduc
Edmonton Strathcona	Len Thom; 17,395; 31.28%	Linda Duncan; 24,446; 43.96%	Eleanor Olszewski; 11,524; 20.73%	Jacob K. Binnema; 1,278; 2.30%	Malcolm Stinson; 311; 0.56%	Ryan Bromsgrove (Pirate); 201 0.36%	Linda Duncan; Edmonton—Strathcona
Edmonton Strathcona	Len Thom; 17,395; 31.28%	Linda Duncan; 24,446; 43.96%	Eleanor Olszewski; 11,524; 20.73%	Jacob K. Binnema; 1,278; 2.30%	Malcolm Stinson; 311; 0.56%	Donovan Eckstrom (Rhino.); 133 0.24%	Linda Duncan; Edmonton—Strathcona
Edmonton Strathcona	Len Thom; 17,395; 31.28%	Linda Duncan; 24,446; 43.96%	Eleanor Olszewski; 11,524; 20.73%	Jacob K. Binnema; 1,278; 2.30%	Malcolm Stinson; 311; 0.56%	Chris Jones (Ind.); 116 0.21%	Linda Duncan; Edmonton—Strathcona
Edmonton Strathcona	Len Thom; 17,395; 31.28%	Linda Duncan; 24,446; 43.96%	Eleanor Olszewski; 11,524; 20.73%	Jacob K. Binnema; 1,278; 2.30%	Malcolm Stinson; 311; 0.56%	Dougal MacDonald (M-L); 93 0.17%	Linda Duncan; Edmonton—Strathcona
Edmonton Strathcona	Len Thom; 17,395; 31.28%	Linda Duncan; 24,446; 43.96%	Eleanor Olszewski; 11,524; 20.73%	Jacob K. Binnema; 1,278; 2.30%	Malcolm Stinson; 311; 0.56%	Andrew Schurman (Ind.); 107 0.19%	Linda Duncan; Edmonton—Strathcona
Edmonton West	Kelly McCauley; 26,370; 49.33%	Heather MacKenzie; 6,955; 13.01%	Karen Leibovici; 18,649; 34.89%	Pamela Leslie Bryan; 1,037; 1.94%	Alexander Dussault; 341; 0.64%	Peggy Morton (M-L); 105; 0.20%	Rona Ambrose‡ Edmonton—Spruce Grove
Edmonton—Wetaskiwin	Mike Lake; 44,949; 65.77%	Fritz K. Bitz; 6,645; 9.72%	Jacqueline Biollo; 14,660; 21.45%	Joy-Ann Hut; 1,595; 2.33%	Brayden Whitlock; 495; 0.72%		New District
St. Albert—Edmonton	Michael Cooper; 26,783; 45.24%	Darlene Malayko; 6,609; 11.16%	Beatrice Ghettuba; 13,343; 22.54%	Andrea Oldham; 821; 1.39%		Brent Rathgeber (Ind.); 11,652; 19.68%	Brent Rathgeber; Edmonton—St. Albert
Sherwood Park—Fort Saskatchewan	Garnett Genuis; 42,642; 63.94%	Joanne Cave; 6,540; 9.81%	Rod Frank; 13,615; 20.42%	Brandie Harrop; 1,648; 2.47%	Stephen C. Burry; 678; 1.02%	James Ford (Ind.); 1,563; 2.34%	Tim Uppal‡ Edmonton—Sherwood Park
Sturgeon River—Parkland	Rona Ambrose; 43,220; 70.23%	Guy Desforges; 6,166; 10.02%	Travis Dueck; 9,586; 15.58%	Brendon Greene; 1,875; 3.05%		Ernest Chauvet (CHP); 690; 1.12%	New District

== 2011 ==
Electoral district	Candidates					Incumbent
Electoral district	Conservative	Liberal	NDP	Green	Other	Incumbent
Edmonton Centre	Laurie Hawn; 23,625; 48.03%	Mary MacDonald; 11,037; 22.44%	Lewis Cardinal; 12,480; 25.37%	David James Parker; 1,676; 3.41%	Peggy Morton (M-L); 81 0.16%	Laurie Hawn
Edmonton Centre	Laurie Hawn; 23,625; 48.03%	Mary MacDonald; 11,037; 22.44%	Lewis Cardinal; 12,480; 25.37%	David James Parker; 1,676; 3.41%	Mikkel Paulson (Pirate); 289 0.59%	Laurie Hawn
Edmonton East	Peter Goldring; 24,111; 52.75%	Shafik Ruda; 3,176; 6.95%	Ray Martin; 17,078; 37.36%	Trey Capnerhurst; 1,345; 2.94%		Peter Goldring
Edmonton—Leduc	James Rajotte; 37,778; 63.57%	Richard Fahlman; 7,270; 12.23%	Artem Medvedev; 11,488; 19.33%	Valerie Kennedy; 2,896; 4.87%		James Rajotte
Edmonton—Mill Woods— Beaumont	Mike Lake; 27,857; 61.04%	Mike Butler; 5,066; 11.10%	Nadine Bailey; 10,875; 23.83%	Christa Baxter; 1,364; 2.99%	Naomi Rankin (Comm.); 100 0.22%	Mike Lake
Edmonton—Mill Woods— Beaumont	Mike Lake; 27,857; 61.04%	Mike Butler; 5,066; 11.10%	Nadine Bailey; 10,875; 23.83%	Christa Baxter; 1,364; 2.99%	Brent Schaffrick (Pirate); 374 0.82%	Mike Lake
Edmonton—St. Albert	Brent Rathgeber; 34,468; 63.46%	Kevin Taron; 5,796; 10.67%	Brian LaBelle; 11,644; 21.44%	Peter Johnston; 2,409; 4.44%		Brent Rathgeber
Edmonton—Sherwood Park	Tim Uppal; 24,623; 44.66%	Rick Szostak; 4,131; 7.49%	Mike Scott; 7,971; 14.46%	Chris Vallee; 1,926; 3.49%	James Ford (Ind.); 16,263 29.50%	Tim Uppal
Edmonton—Sherwood Park	Tim Uppal; 24,623; 44.66%	Rick Szostak; 4,131; 7.49%	Mike Scott; 7,971; 14.46%	Chris Vallee; 1,926; 3.49%	Paul St. Laurent (WBP); 222 0.40%	Tim Uppal
Edmonton—Spruce Grove	Rona Ambrose; 41,782; 71.10%	Chris Austin; 5,483; 9.33%	Catherine Chaulk-Stokes; 9,272; 15.78%	Joshua Lund; 2,232; 3.80%		Rona Ambrose
Edmonton—Strathcona	Ryan Hastman; 19,762; 40.55%	Matthew Sinclair; 1,372; 2.82%	Linda Duncan; 26,093; 53.55%	Andrew Fehr; 1,119; 2.30%	Kevan Hunter (M-L); 91 0.19%	Linda Duncan
Edmonton—Strathcona	Ryan Hastman; 19,762; 40.55%	Matthew Sinclair; 1,372; 2.82%	Linda Duncan; 26,093; 53.55%	Andrew Fehr; 1,119; 2.30%	Kyle Murphy (Ind.); 206 0.42%	Linda Duncan
Edmonton—Strathcona	Ryan Hastman; 19,762; 40.55%	Matthew Sinclair; 1,372; 2.82%	Linda Duncan; 26,093; 53.55%	Andrew Fehr; 1,119; 2.30%	Christopher White (Ind.); 87 0.18%	Linda Duncan

== 2008 ==
Electoral district	Candidates					Incumbent
Electoral district	Conservative	Liberal	NDP	Green	Other	Incumbent
Edmonton Centre	Laurie Hawn; 22,634; 49.04%	Jim Wachowich; 12,661; 27.43%	Donna Martyn; 6,912; 14.98%	David James Parker; 3,746; 8.12%	Peggy Morton (M-L); 203; 0.44%	Laurie Hawn
Edmonton East	Peter Goldring; 21,487; 51.32%	Stephanie Laskoski; 4,578; 10.93%	Ray Martin; 13,318; 31.81%	Trey Capnerhurst; 2,488; 5.94%		Peter Goldring
Edmonton—Leduc	James Rajotte; 33,174; 63.21%	Donna Lynn Smith; 9,234; 17.59%	Hana Razga; 5,994; 11.42%	Valerie Kennedy; 4,081; 7.78%		James Rajotte
Edmonton—Mill Woods— Beaumont	Mike Lake; 25,130; 60.32%	Indira Saroya; 7,709; 18.51%	Mike Butler; 6,297; 15.12%	David Allan Hrushka; 2,366; 5.68%	Naomi Rankin (Comm.); 157; 0.38%	Mike Lake
Edmonton—St. Albert	Brent Rathgeber; 31,436; 61.65%	Sam Sleiman; 7,441; 14.59%	Dave Burkhart; 8,045; 15.78%	Peter Johnston; 4,072; 7.99%		John Williams†
Edmonton—Sherwood Park	Tim Uppal; 17,628; 35.84%	Rick Szostak; 5,575; 11.34%	Brian LaBelle; 6,339; 12.89%	Nina Erfani; 3,678; 7.48%	James Ford (Ind.); 15,960; 32.45%	Ken Epp†
Edmonton—Spruce Grove	Rona Ambrose; 36,402; 68.55%	Chris Austin; 6,099; 11.49%	Barb Phillips; 6,627; 12.48%	Wendy Walker; 3,975; 7.49%		Rona Ambrose
Edmonton—Strathcona	Rahim Jaffer; 19,640; 41.60%	Claudette Roy; 4,279; 9.06%	Linda Duncan; 20,103; 42.58%	Jane Thrall; 3,040; 6.44%	Kevan Hunter (M-L); 147; 0.31%	Rahim Jaffer

== 2006 ==
Electoral district	Candidates					Incumbent
Electoral district	Liberal	Conservative	NDP	Green	Other	Incumbent
Edmonton Centre	Anne McLellan; 22,196; 38.58%	Laurie Hawn; 25,805; 44.85%	Donna Martyn; 6,187; 10.75%	David J. Parker; 3,021; 5.25%	Peggy Morton (M–L); 117 0.20%	Anne McLellan
Edmonton Centre	Anne McLellan; 22,196; 38.58%	Laurie Hawn; 25,805; 44.85%	Donna Martyn; 6,187; 10.75%	David J. Parker; 3,021; 5.25%	Chandra Segaran Swamy (Ind.); 204 0.35%	Anne McLellan
Edmonton East	Nicole Martel; 13,088; 26.16%	Peter Goldring; 25,086; 50.13%	Arlene Chapman; 9,243; 18.47%	Trey Capnerhurst; 2,623; 5.24%		Peter Goldring
Edmonton—Leduc	Jim Jacuta; 10,856; 19.46%	James Rajotte; 33,764; 60.53%	Marty Rybiak; 7,685; 13.78%	Ben Morrison Pettit; 3,479; 6.24%		James Rajotte
Edmonton—Mill Woods— Beaumont	Amarjit Grewal; 9,809; 21.15%	Mike Lake; 27,191; 58.62%	Neal Gray; 6,749; 14.55%	Kate Harrington; 2,073; 4.47%	Kyle McLeod (Ind.); 477 1.03%	David Kilgour (Note: Elected as a Liberal in 2004, left the Liberal caucus in April 2005 to protest the Sponsorship scandal.)
Edmonton—Mill Woods— Beaumont	Amarjit Grewal; 9,809; 21.15%	Mike Lake; 27,191; 58.62%	Neal Gray; 6,749; 14.55%	Kate Harrington; 2,073; 4.47%	Naomi Rankin (Comm.); 85 0.18%	David Kilgour
Edmonton—St. Albert	Stanley Haroun; 11,893; 20.29%	John Williams; 34,997; 59.69%	Mike Melymick; 8,218; 14.02%	Peter Johnston; 3,520; 6.00%		John Williams
Edmonton—Sherwood Park	Ron Symic; 7,801; 14.36%	Ken Epp; 34,740; 63.97%	Laurie Lang; 7,773; 14.31%	Lynn T. Lau; 3,992; 7.35%		Ken Epp
Edmonton—Spruce Grove	Brad Enge; 9,776; 16.83%	Rona Ambrose; 38,826; 66.83%	Jason Rockwell; 6,091; 10.48%	John Lackey; 3,404; 5.86%		Rona Ambrose
Edmonton—Strathcona	Andy Hladyshevsky; 9,391; 17.80%	Rahim Jaffer; 22,009; 41.71%	Linda Duncan; 17,153; 32.51%	Cameron Wakefield; 3,139; 5.95%	Dave Dowling (Mar.); 390 0.74%	Rahim Jaffer
Edmonton—Strathcona	Andy Hladyshevsky; 9,391; 17.80%	Rahim Jaffer; 22,009; 41.71%	Linda Duncan; 17,153; 32.51%	Cameron Wakefield; 3,139; 5.95%	Michael Fedeyko (PC); 582 1.10%	Rahim Jaffer
Edmonton—Strathcona	Andy Hladyshevsky; 9,391; 17.80%	Rahim Jaffer; 22,009; 41.71%	Linda Duncan; 17,153; 32.51%	Cameron Wakefield; 3,139; 5.95%	Kevan Hunter (M–L); 106 0.20%	Rahim Jaffer

== 2004 ==
Electoral district	Candidates					Incumbent
Electoral district	Liberal	Conservative	NDP	Green	Other	Incumbent
Edmonton—Beaumont	David Kilgour; 17,555; 42.82%	Tim Uppal; 17,421; 42.49%	Paul Reikie; 3,975; 9.70%	Michael Garfinkle; 1,911; 4.66%	Naomi Rankin (Comm.); 135; 0.33%	David Kilgour; Edmonton Southeast
Edmonton Centre	Anne McLellan; 22,560; 42.50%	Laurie Hawn; 21,839; 41.14%	Meghan McMaster; 4,836; 9.11%	David J. Parker; 2,584; 4.87%	John Baloun (Ind.); 221 0.42%	Anne McLellan; Edmonton West
Edmonton Centre	Anne McLellan; 22,560; 42.50%	Laurie Hawn; 21,839; 41.14%	Meghan McMaster; 4,836; 9.11%	David J. Parker; 2,584; 4.87%	Lyle Kenny (Mar.); 509 0.96%	Anne McLellan; Edmonton West
Edmonton Centre	Anne McLellan; 22,560; 42.50%	Laurie Hawn; 21,839; 41.14%	Meghan McMaster; 4,836; 9.11%	David J. Parker; 2,584; 4.87%	Peggy Morton (M-L); 78 0.15%	Anne McLellan; Edmonton West
Edmonton Centre	Anne McLellan; 22,560; 42.50%	Laurie Hawn; 21,839; 41.14%	Meghan McMaster; 4,836; 9.11%	David J. Parker; 2,584; 4.87%	Sean Tisdall (PC); 456 0.86%	Anne McLellan; Edmonton West
Edmonton East	John Bethel^{@} 14,250; 32.43%	Peter Goldring; 20,224; 46.02%	Janina Strudwick; 6,464; 14.71%	Harlan Light; 2,471; 5.62%	Ed Spronk (CHP); 538; 1.22%	Peter Goldring; Edmonton Centre-East
Edmonton—Leduc	Bruce King; 14,269; 29.32%	James Rajotte; 26,791; 55.05%	Doug McLachlan; 4,581; 9.41%	Bruce Sinclair; 3,029; 6.22%		James Rajotte; Edmonton Southwest
Edmonton—St. Albert	Moe Saeed; 12,359; 24.15%	John Williams; 29,508; 57.65%	Mike Melymick; 5,927; 11.58%	Conrad A. Bitangcol; 3,387; 6.62%		John Williams; St. Albert
Edmonton—St. Albert	Moe Saeed; 12,359; 24.15%	John Williams; 29,508; 57.65%	Mike Melymick; 5,927; 11.58%	Conrad A. Bitangcol; 3,387; 6.62%		merged district
Edmonton—St. Albert	Moe Saeed; 12,359; 24.15%	John Williams; 29,508; 57.65%	Mike Melymick; 5,927; 11.58%	Conrad A. Bitangcol; 3,387; 6.62%		Deborah Grey†; Edmonton North
Edmonton—Sherwood Park	Maureen Towns; 11,519; 24.49%	Ken Epp; 27,222; 57.87%	Chris Harwood; 5,155; 10.96%	Margaret Marean; 3,146; 6.69%		Ken Epp; Elk Island
Edmonton—Spruce Grove	Neil Mather; 12,912; 25.57%	Rona Ambrose; 30,497; 60.40%	Hayley Phillips; 4,508; 8.93%	Jerry Paschen; 2,572; 5.09%		new district
Edmonton—Strathcona	Debby Carlson; 14,057; 29.01%	Rahim Jaffer; 19,089; 39.40%	Malcolm Azania; 11,535; 23.81%	Cameron Wakefield; 3,146; 6.49%	Dave Dowling (Mar.); 519 1.07%	Rahim Jaffer
Edmonton—Strathcona	Debby Carlson; 14,057; 29.01%	Rahim Jaffer; 19,089; 39.40%	Malcolm Azania; 11,535; 23.81%	Cameron Wakefield; 3,146; 6.49%	Kevan Hunter (M-L); 103 0.21%	Rahim Jaffer

=== Maps ===
1. Edmonton-Mill Woods-Beaumont
2. Edmonton Centre
3. Edmonton East
4. Edmonton-Leduc
5. Edmonton-St. Albert
6. Edmonton-Sherwood Park
7. Edmonton-Spruce Grove
8. Edmonton-Strathcona
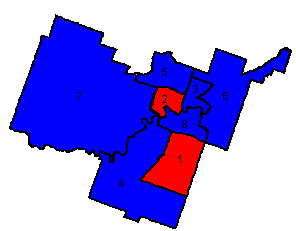
Key map

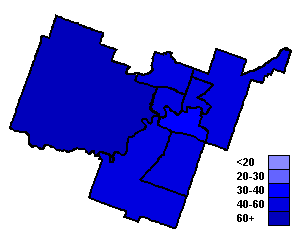
Conservative Party of Canada

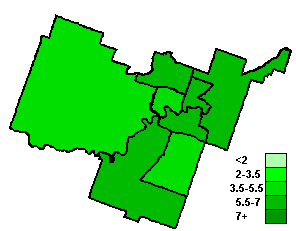
Green Party of Canada

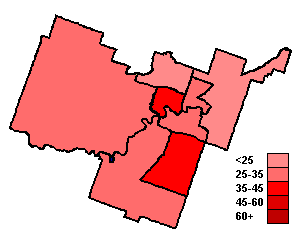
Liberal Party of Canada

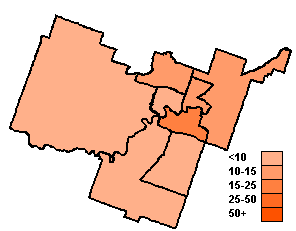
New Democratic Party

== 2000 ==
Parties	1st	2nd	3rd	4th
Alliance	6	2	0	0
Liberal	2	6	0	0
Progressive Conservative	0	0	5	3
New Democratic	0	0	3	5

Electoral district	Candidates					Incumbent
Electoral district	Liberal	Canadian Alliance	NDP	PC	Other	Incumbent
Edmonton Centre-East	Sue Olsen; 14,323; 34.21%	Peter Goldring; 17,768; 42.44%	Ray Martin; 7,304; 17.44%	Kevin Mahfouz; 2,252; 5.38%	Naomi Rankin (Comm.); 222; 0.53%	Peter Goldring; Edmonton East
Edmonton North	Jim Jacuta; 14,786; 34.33%	Deborah Grey; 22,063; 51.22%	Laurie Lang; 3,216; 7.47%	Dean Sanduga; 3,010; 6.99%		Deborah Grey
Edmonton Southeast	David Kilgour; 21,109; 50.87%	Tim Uppal; 16,392; 39.51%	Joginder Kandola; 1,285; 3.10%	Allan Ryan; 2,269; 5.47%	Matthew James (Comm.); 97 0.23%	David Kilgour
Edmonton Southeast	David Kilgour; 21,109; 50.87%	Tim Uppal; 16,392; 39.51%	Joginder Kandola; 1,285; 3.10%	Allan Ryan; 2,269; 5.47%	Michael Sekuloff (CAP); 154 0.37%	David Kilgour
Edmonton Southeast	David Kilgour; 21,109; 50.87%	Tim Uppal; 16,392; 39.51%	Joginder Kandola; 1,285; 3.10%	Allan Ryan; 2,269; 5.47%	Richard Shelford (NLP); 187 0.45%	David Kilgour
Edmonton Southwest	Chiu Lau; 18,223; 33.98%	James Rajotte; 26,197; 48.85%	Bernie Keeler; 2,746; 5.12%	Joseph Fernando; 5,803; 10.82%	Wade McKinley (NLP); 195 0.36%	Ian McClelland
Edmonton Southwest	Chiu Lau; 18,223; 33.98%	James Rajotte; 26,197; 48.85%	Bernie Keeler; 2,746; 5.12%	Joseph Fernando; 5,803; 10.82%	Jerry Paschen (Green); 462 0.86%	Ian McClelland
Edmonton—Strathcona	Jonathan Dai; 17,816; 31.89%	Rahim Jaffer; 23,463; 42.00%	Hélène Narayana; 8,256; 14.78%	Gregory Toogood; 5,047; 9.04%	Kevan Hunter (M-L); 164 0.29%	Rahim Jaffer
Edmonton—Strathcona	Jonathan Dai; 17,816; 31.89%	Rahim Jaffer; 23,463; 42.00%	Hélène Narayana; 8,256; 14.78%	Gregory Toogood; 5,047; 9.04%	Ken Kirk (Mar.); 814 1.46%	Rahim Jaffer
Edmonton—Strathcona	Jonathan Dai; 17,816; 31.89%	Rahim Jaffer; 23,463; 42.00%	Hélène Narayana; 8,256; 14.78%	Gregory Toogood; 5,047; 9.04%	Kesa Rose Semenchuk (CAP); 299 0.54%	Rahim Jaffer
Edmonton West	Anne McLellan; 21,978; 44.24%	Betty Unger; 21,245; 42.77%	Richard D. Vanderberg; 2,895; 5.83%	Rory J. Koopmans; 3,009; 6.06%	Peggy Morton (M-L); 194 0.39%	Anne McLellan
Edmonton West	Anne McLellan; 21,978; 44.24%	Betty Unger; 21,245; 42.77%	Richard D. Vanderberg; 2,895; 5.83%	Rory J. Koopmans; 3,009; 6.06%	Dan Parker (CAP); 354 0.71%	Anne McLellan
Elk Island	Paul Bokowski; 9,289; 17.68%	Ken Epp; 33,730; 64.23%	Chris Harwood; 3,316; 6.31%	Rod Scarlett; 6,178; 11.76%		Ken Epp
St. Albert	Bob Russell; 13,637; 24.78%	John G. Williams; 32,745; 59.50%	John Williams; 2,965; 5.39%	Andy Jones; 5,687; 10.33%		John G. Williams

== 1997 ==
Parties	1st	2nd	3rd	4th
Reform	6	2	0	0
Liberal	2	6	0	0
New Democratic	0	0	4	4
Progressive Conservative	0	0	4	4

Electoral district	Candidates						Incumbent
Electoral district	Liberal	Reform	PC	NDP	Green	Other	Incumbent
Edmonton East	Judy Bethel; 12,005	Peter Goldring; 15,475	Carla Barkley; 2,535	Hana Razga; 4,096	Ed Schell; 211	394	Judy Bethel
Edmonton North	Jonathan Murphy; 11,820	Deborah Grey; 16,124	Mitch Panciuk; 2,811	Ray Martin; 5,413		226	John Loney
Edmonton Southeast	David Kilgour; 14,745	Eleanor Maroes; 13,295	Terence Bachor; 1,994	Roberta Allen; 1,882		152	David Kilgour
Edmonton Southwest	Esther Starkman; 14,833	Ian McClelland; 22,697	Ellie Shuster; 4,403	Richard Vanderberg; 2,070		205	Ian McClelland
Edmonton West	Anne McLellan; 17,802	Dean Charles Kurpjuweit; 16,392	Helen Stephenson; 2,919	Duane Good Striker; 3,386	Roger Swan; 210	265	Anne McLellan; Edmonton Northwest
Edmonton—Strathcona	Ginette Rodger; 17,654	Rahim Jaffer; 20,605	Edo Nyland; 3,614	Jean Mcbean; 7,251	Karina Gregory; 406	360	Hugh Hanrahan
Elk Island	Vic Bidzinski; 8,536	Ken Epp; 26,276	Peter Tadman; 5,416	Mary Ellen Vandusen; 2,544		559	Ken Epp
St. Albert	Doug Kennedy; 12,537	John G. Williams; 24,269	Mike Partington; 4,645	Jim Connelly; 2,172		354	John G. Williams

== 1993 ==
Parties	1st	2nd	3rd	4th	5th
Reform	4	4	0	0	0
Liberal	4	4	0	0	0
Progressive Conservative	0	0	6	2	0
New Democratic	0	0	1	5	2
National	0	0	1	1	5

Electoral district	Candidates						Incumbent
Electoral district	Liberal	Reform	PC	NDP	National	Other	Incumbent
Edmonton East	Judy Bethel; 11,922	Linda Robertson; 11,807	Kevin Kovacs; 2,672	Ross Harvey; 7,976	Jim Musson; 1,105	689	Ross Harvey
Edmonton North	John Loney; 19,536	Ron Mix; 19,334	Mitch Panciuk; 4,592	Lori Hall; 3,427	Ed Agoto; 2,168	442	Steve Paproski
Edmonton Northwest	Anne McLellan; 12,599	Richard Kayler; 12,587	Murray Dorin; 3,485	Stephanie Michaels; 1,671	Mel Hurtig; 4,507	346	Murray Dorin
Edmonton Southeast	David Kilgour; 23,129	Aurell Royer; 19,910	John Kurian; 3,203	Ken Ross; 1,988	Janet Blond; 1,443	435	David Kilgour (Note: Elected as a Progressive Conservative in 1988, was expelled from the PC caucus in April 1990 and joined the Liberal caucus later that year.)
Edmonton Southwest	Betty Macfarlan; 19,570	Ian McLelland; 26,582	Jim Edwards; 9,385	Colleen Glenn; 2,148		797	Jim Edwards
Edmonton—Strathcona	Chris Peirce; 19,137	Hugh Hanrahan; 19,541	Scott Thorkelson; 5,617	Rita Egan; 2,513	Adrian Greenwood; 2,131	743	Scott Thorkelson
Elk Island	Jean Boisvert; 11,589	Ken Epp; 25,726	Brian O'Kurley; 5,714	Steve Jacobs; 1,296	James Keith Steinhubl; 1,222	359	Brian O'Kurley
St. Albert	Jack Jeffery; 13,860	John G. Williams; 24,964	Jerry Manegre; 5,884	Zahid Makhdoom; 1,435	Steven Powers; 2,219	641	Walter van de Walle

== 1988 ==
Parties	1st	2nd	3rd	4th
Progressive Conservative	7	1	0	0
New Democratic	1	5	2	0
Liberal	0	2	4	2
Reform	0	0	2	6

Electoral district	Candidates					Incumbent
Electoral district	PC	Liberal	NDP	Reform	Other	Incumbent
Edmonton East	William Lesick; 14,394	Peggy Blair; 7,167	Ross Harvey; 15,051	Elaine Sim; 1,728	1,062	William Lesick
Edmonton North	Steve Paproski; 19,045	John Loney; 9,270	Nels Rissling; 15,583	A. Erich Bier; 2,630	1,046	Steve Paproski
Edmonton Northwest	Murray Dorin; 15,556	Colin P. Mcdonald; 6,710	Marie Gordon; 13,198	Paul C. Sherstan; 2,956	405	Murray Dorin; Edmonton West
Edmonton Southeast	David Kilgour; 23,597	Chris Peirce; 10,104	Harbans Dhillon; 9,161	Wes Mcleod; 5,192	428	New district
Edmonton Southwest	Jim Edwards; 28,931	Barclay W. Johnson; 10,375	Bob Friedland; 8,598	Chuck Cripps; 5,646	442	Jim Edwards; Edmonton South
Edmonton—Strathcona	Scott Thorkelson; 18,088	Una MacLean Evans; 9,672	Halyna Freeland; 13,686	Doug Main; 12,024	583	David Kilgour
Elk Island	Brian O'Kurley; 19,447	Patricia L. Hunter; 3,613	Rolf E. Nielsen; 9,046	Dennis Tindall; 8,131	123	New district
St. Albert	Walter Van De Walle; 19,945	Kent Davidson; 7,140	Dennis Pawlowski; 8,370	Ken Allred; 5,955	1,285	Walter Van De Walle; Pembina

== 1984 ==
Parties	1st	2nd	3rd
Progressive Conservative	6	0	0
New Democratic	0	5	1
Liberal	0	1	5

Electoral district	Candidates				Incumbent
Electoral district	PC	Liberal	NDP	Other	Incumbent
Edmonton East	William Lesick; 16,119	Al Iafolla; 6,002	Muriel Stanley Venne; 7,668	3,459	William Yurko
Edmonton North	Steve Paproski; 29,074	Dave Stewart; 8,311	Garth Stevenson; 12,305	1,059	Steve Paproski
Edmonton South	Jim Edwards; 32,510	Ken Munro; 8,259	Joanna L.H. Miazga; 9,407	1,870	Douglas Roche
Edmonton West	Murray Dorin; 25,764	Mike Macdonald; 9,673	Michael Moroz; 7,339	1,023	Marcel Lambert
Edmonton—Strathcona	David Kilgour; 33,712	Sandra Douglas-Tubb; 8,500	Doris S. Burghardt; 11,095	1,570	David Kilgour
Pembina	Peter Elzinga; 44,026	Bob Russell; 7,228	Greg Daruda; 9,792	1,342	Peter Elzinga
