= Naomi Rankin =

Canadian politician and party leader

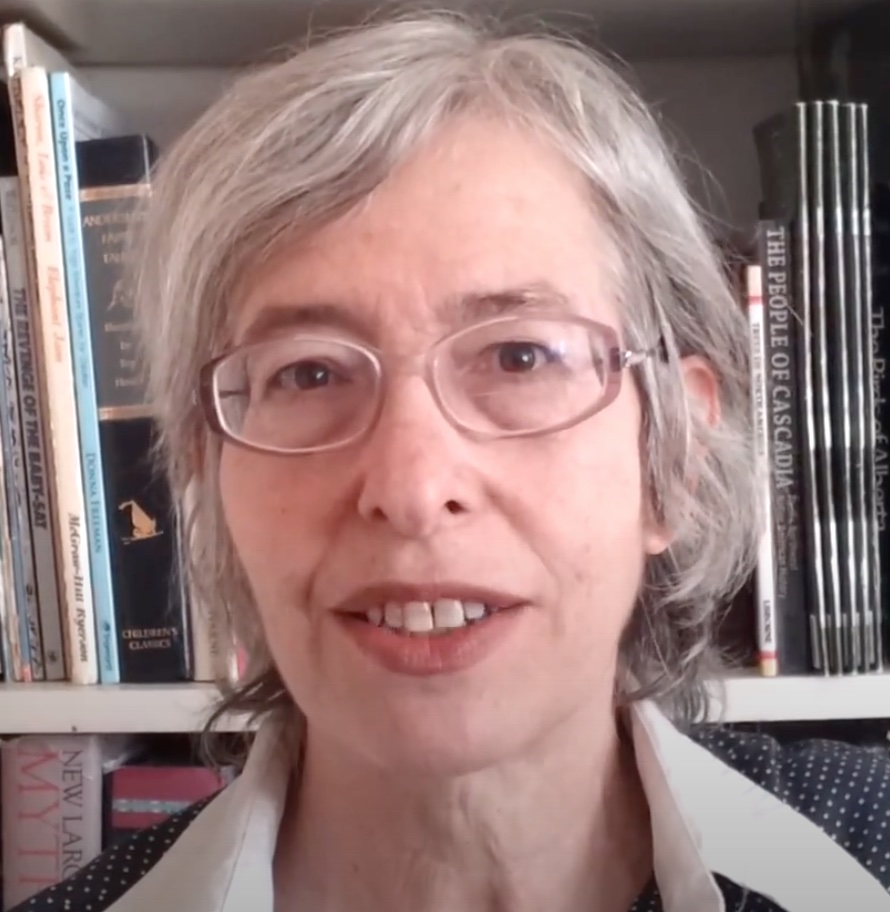
- Rankin in 2015

Leader of the Communist Party – Alberta
- Incumbent
- Assumed office 1992
- Preceded by: Norman Brudy

Personal details
- Born: 1951 or 1952 (age 74–75)
- Party: Communist
- Profession: Politician, programmer

Naomi Rankin (born 1951 or 1952) is a Canadian politician who has served as the leader of the Communist Party – Alberta since 1992. She is the longest-serving party leader in Alberta, and has been a perennial candidate in the province's federal and provincial elections since 1982.

== Political career ==
Rankin became leader of the Communist Party in Alberta in 1992, after the collapse of the Soviet Union sent the party into crisis. Since 1982, she has run in every provincial and federal election for the Communist Party – Alberta and the Communist Party of Canada respectively. Rankin herself usually fields around 100 votes.

In a typical election campaign, Rankin goes door-to-door and distributes pamphlets, as she tries to engage voters in discussions about the party's main platforms. In the 1980s, these included the nationalization of transnational oil and gas companies, and making Alberta a nuclear weapons-free zone. Since then, issues on the Communist Party agenda have included opposing privatization, doubling the corporate tax rate, and making drastic cuts to military spending. She also appears in forums, debates, and media interviews, in which she tries to debunk popular myths about the Communist Party and socialism. As a candidate, Rankin has aimed to spread her message beyond the party's traditional targets such as trade unions, environmental groups, women's organizations, and farmers.

== Personal life ==
Rankin is widowed with two children, and is retired from her career as a computer programmer. She has lived in Edmonton since 1963. A social activist since her teens, she has been active in peace and women's organizations. Rankin sings in the "Notre Dame des Bananes” choir, which performs songs about social justice, and has also sung as a tenor with the Richard Eaton Singers.

== Electoral record ==
=== Federal ===
2021 Canadian federal election
| Party | Candidate | Votes | % | ±% | Expenditures |
|---|---|---|---|---|---|
| Conservative | Tim Uppal | 18,392 | 37.9 | -12.4 | $93,973.02 |
| Liberal | Ben Henderson | 16,499 | 34.0 | +0.4 | $76,933.26 |
| New Democratic | Nigel Logan | 10,553 | 21.8 | +9.7 | $2,274.37 |
| People's | Paul Edward McCormack | 2,898 | 6.0 | +4.2 | $1,732.00 |
| Communist | Naomi Rankin | 172 | 0.4 | - | $0.00 |
| Total valid votes/Expense limit | | 48,514 | – | – | $109,498.31 |
| Total rejected ballots | | 380 | | | |
| Turnout | | 48,894 | | | |
| Eligible voters | | 77,062 | | | |
| Conservative hold | | Swing | | -6.4 | |
Source: Elections Canada

2019 Canadian federal election: Edmonton Strathcona
| Party | Candidate | Votes | % | ±% | Expenditures |
|---|---|---|---|---|---|
| New Democratic | Heather McPherson | 26,823 | 47.27 | +3.31 | $93,513.73 |
| Conservative | Sam Lilly | 21,035 | 37.07 | +5.79 | $88,211.43 |
| Liberal | Eleanor Olszewski | 6,592 | 11.62 | –9.11 | $90,837.85 |
| Green | Michael Kalmanovitch | 1,152 | 2.03 | –0.27 | $8,919.41 |
| People's | Ian Cameron | 941 | 1.66 | – | $1,364.69 |
| Communist | Naomi Rankin | 125 | 0.22 | – | $496.07 |
| Marxist–Leninist | Dougal MacDonald | 77 | 0.14 | –0.03 | none listed |
| Total valid votes/expense limit | | 56,745 | 99.56 | – | $106,353.94 |
| Total rejected ballots | | 250 | 0.44 | +0.05 | |
| Turnout | | 56,995 | 72.26 | +1.27 | |
| Eligible voters | | 78,876 | | | |
| New Democratic hold | | Swing | | +4.55 | |
Source: Elections Canada

2015 Canadian federal election: Edmonton Mill Woods
| Party | Candidate | Votes | % | ±% | Expenditures |
|---|---|---|---|---|---|
| Liberal | Amarjeet Sohi | 20,423 | 41.24 | +29.52 | $136,379.94 |
| Conservative | Tim Uppal | 20,331 | 41.06 | –17.88 | $123,071.17 |
| New Democratic | Jasvir Deol | 6,330 | 12.78 | –12.61 | $55,302.53 |
| Green | Ralph McLean | 1,096 | 2.21 | –0.78 | $1,671.63 |
| Independent | Colin Stubbs | 560 | 1.13 | – | $5,091.44 |
| Libertarian | Allen K.W. Paley | 396 | 0.80 | – | $2,910.11 |
| Christian Heritage | Peter Downing | 285 | 0.58 | – | $3,798.53 |
| Communist | Naomi Rankin | 96 | 0.19 | – | none listed |
| Total valid votes/expense limit | | 49,517 | 99.54 | – | $206,234.63 |
| Total rejected ballots | | 227 | 0.46 | – | |
| Turnout | | 49,744 | 66.64 | – | |
| Eligible voters | | 74,651 | | | |
| Liberal gain from Conservative | | Swing | | +23.70 | |
These results were subject to a judicial recount, and modified from the validated results in accordance with the Judge's rulings. The margin of Sohi over Uppal increased from 79 votes to 92 votes as a result of the recount.
Source: Elections Canada

2011 Canadian federal election
| Party | Candidate | Votes | % | ±% | Expenditures |
|---|---|---|---|---|---|
| Conservative | Mike Lake | 27,857 | 61.04 | +0.72 | $44,902 |
| New Democratic | Nadine Bailey | 10,875 | 23.83 | +8.71 | $11,236 |
| Liberal | Mike Butler | 5,066 | 11.10 | -7.40 | |
| Green | Christa Baxter | 1,364 | 2.99 | -2.69 | $1,705 |
| Pirate | Brent Schaffrick | 374 | 0.82 | * | $2,461 |
| Communist | Naomi Rankin | 100 | 0.22 | -0.16 | $562 |
| Total valid votes/Expense limit | | 45,636 | 99.58 | | |
| Total rejected ballots | | 191 | 0.42 | +0.07 | |
| Turnout | | 45,827 | 53.13 | +1.03 | |
| Eligible voters | | 85,259 | – | – | |
| Conservative hold | | Swing | | -4.00 | |

2008 Canadian federal election
| Party | Candidate | Votes | % | ±% | Expenditures |
|---|---|---|---|---|---|
| Conservative | Mike Lake | 25,130 | 60.32 | +1.70 | $80,034 |
| Liberal | Indira Saroya | 7,709 | 18.51 | -2.64 | $82,941 |
| New Democratic | Mike Butler | 6,297 | 15.12 | +0.57 | $4,620 |
| Green | David Allan Hrushka | 2,366 | 5.68 | +1.21 | |
| Communist | Naomi Rankin | 157 | 0.38 | +0.19 | $395 |
| Total valid votes/Expense limit | | 41,659 | 100.00 | $84,984 | |
| Total rejected ballots | | 146 | 0.35 | +0.07 | |
| Turnout | | 41,805 | 52.0 | -10.3 | |

2006 Canadian federal election
| Party | Candidate | Votes | % | ±% | Expenditures |
|---|---|---|---|---|---|
| Conservative | Mike Lake | 27,191 | 58.62 | +16.13 | $67,482 |
| Liberal | Amarjit Grewal | 9,809 | 21.15 | -21.67 | $73,522 |
| New Democratic | Neal Gray | 6,749 | 14.55 | +4.85 | $10,297 |
| Green | Kate Harrington | 2,073 | 4.47 | -0.19 | $1,347 |
| Independent | Kyle McLeod | 477 | 1.03 | N/A | $8,055 |
| Communist | Naomi Rankin | 85 | 0.18 | -0.15 | $280 |
| Total valid votes | | 46,384 | 100.00 | | |
| Total rejected ballots | | 131 | 0.28 | +0.16 | |
| Turnout | | 46,515 | 62.3 | -2.6 | |

2004 Canadian federal election
| Party | Candidate | Votes | % | ±% | Expenditures |
|---|---|---|---|---|---|
| Liberal | David Kilgour | 17,555 | 42.82 | – | $65,152 |
| Conservative | Tim Uppal | 17,421 | 42.49 | – | $66,701 |
| New Democratic | Paul Reikie | 3,975 | 9.70 | – | $4,138 |
| Green | Michael Garfinkle | 1,911 | 4.65 | – | $788 |
| Communist | Naomi Rankin | 135 | 0.33 | – | $751 |
| Total valid votes | | 40,997 | 100.00 | | |
| Total rejected ballots | | 181 | 0.44 | | |
| Turnout | | 41,178 | 59.67 | | |

2000 Canadian federal election
| Party | Candidate | Votes | % | ±% | Expenditures |
|---|---|---|---|---|---|
| Alliance | Peter Goldring | 17,768 | 42.43 | -2.14 | $58,345 |
| Liberal | Sue Olsen | 14,323 | 34.20 | -0.38 | $57,858 |
| New Democratic | Ray Martin | 7,304 | 17.44 | +5.65 | $56,287 |
| Progressive Conservative | Kevin Mahfouz | 2,252 | 5.37 | -1.93 | $1,688 |
| Communist | Naomi Rankin | 222 | 0.53 | – | $238 |
| Total valid votes | | 41,869 | 100.00 | | – |
| Total rejected ballots | | 156 | 0.37 | +0.15 | |
| Turnout | | 42,025 | 53.42 | +1.73 | |

Note: Canadian Alliance vote is compared to the Reform vote in 1997.

1997 Canadian federal election: Edmonton Strathcona
| Party | Candidate | Votes | % | ±% | Expenditures |
|---|---|---|---|---|---|
| Reform | Rahim Jaffer | 20,605 | 41.30 | +1.97 | $58,003 |
| Liberal | Ginette Rodger | 17,654 | 35.39 | –3.13 | $58,244 |
| New Democratic | Jean McBean | 7,251 | 14.53 | +9.48 | $42,936 |
| Progressive Conservative | Edo Nyland | 3,614 | 7.24 | –4.06 | $10,183 |
| Green | Karina Gregory | 406 | 0.81 | +0.24 | $520 |
| Natural Law | Maury Shapka | 153 | 0.31 | –0.27 | none listed |
| Independent | Naomi Rankin | 115 | 0.23 | +0.05 | $1,732 |
| Canadian Action | J. Alex Ford | 92 | 0.18 | – | $845 |
| Total valid votes | | 49,890 | 99.80 | | |
| Total rejected ballots | | 101 | 0.20 | –0.02 | |
| Turnout | | 49,991 | 62.74 | –2.11 | |
| Eligible voters | | 79,680 | | | |
| Reform hold | | Swing | | +2.55 | |
Source: Elections Canada

1993 Canadian federal election: Edmonton Strathcona
| Party | Candidate | Votes | % | ±% |
|---|---|---|---|---|
| Reform | Hugh Hanrahan | 19,541 | 39.33 | +17.09 |
| Liberal | Chris Peirce | 19,137 | 38.52 | +20.63 |
| Progressive Conservative | Scott Thorkelson | 5,617 | 11.31 | –22.16 |
| New Democratic | Rita Egan | 2,513 | 5.06 | –20.26 |
| National | Adrian Greenwood | 2,129 | 4.29 | – |
| Green | Harry Garfinkle | 286 | 0.58 | +0.28 |
| Natural Law | Maury Shapka | 284 | 0.57 | – |
| Independent | Naomi Rankin | 92 | 0.19 | –0.16 |
| Canada Party | Oran Johnson | 83 | 0.17 | – |
| Total valid votes | | 49,682 | 99.78 | |
| Total rejected ballots | | 112 | 0.22 | +0.00 |
| Turnout | | 49,794 | 64.85 | –14.86 |
| Eligible voters | | 76,779 | | |
| Reform gain | | Swing | | |
Source: Elections Canada

1988 Canadian federal election
| Party | Candidate | Votes | % | ±% |
|---|---|---|---|---|
| New Democratic | Ross Harvey | 15,051 | 38.20 | +15.14 |
| Progressive Conservative | William Lesick | 14,394 | 36.53 | -11.95 |
| Liberal | Peggy Blair | 7,167 | 18.19 | +0.14 |
| Reform | Elaine Sim | 1,728 | 4.39 | |
| Christian Heritage | Ron Romanow | 798 | 2.03 | |
| Communist | Naomi Rankin | 123 | 0.31 | -0.07 |
| Independent | Bernie Sawatzky | 88 | 0.22 | |
| Confederation of Regions | Robert J. Yanew | 53 | 0.13 | -0.59 |
| Total valid votes | | 39,402 | 100.00 | |

=== Provincial ===
2023 Alberta general election: Edmonton-Highlands-Norwood
| Party | Candidate | Votes | % | ±% |
|---|---|---|---|---|
| New Democratic | Janis Irwin | 9,491 | 71.46 | +8.01 |
| United Conservative | Nick Kalynchuk | 3,350 | 25.22 | -0.26 |
| Green | Kristine Kowalchuk | 339 | 2.55 | +1.01 |
| Communist | Naomi Rankin | 102 | 0.77 | +0.11 |
| Total | | 13,282 | 99.01 | – |
| Rejected and declined | | 133 | 0.99 | |
| Turnout | | 13,415 | 45.22 | |
| Eligible voters | | 29,665 | | |
| New Democratic hold | | Swing | | +4.13 |
Source(s) Source: Elections Alberta

2019 Alberta general election: Edmonton-Strathcona
| Party | Candidate | Votes | % | ±% |
|---|---|---|---|---|
| New Democratic | Rachel Notley | 14,724 | 72.10 | −8.79 |
| United Conservative | Kulshan Gill | 3,481 | 17.05 | +2.56 (Note: Change from combined Progressive Conservative and Wildrose) |
| Alberta Party | Prem Pal | 1,139 | 5.58 | +5.35 |
| Progressive Conservative | Gary Horan | 297 | 1.45 | −12.41 |
| Liberal | Samantha Hees | 239 | 1.17 | −3.11 |
| Green | Stuart Andrews | 227 | 1.11 | +1.08 |
| Alberta Independence | Ian Smythe | 86 | 0.42 | – |
| Alberta Advantage | Don Edward Meister | 62 | 0.30 | – |
| Communist | Naomi J. Rankin | 61 | 0.30 | – |
| Wildrose | Dale Doan | 57 | 0.28 | -0.35 |
| Independent | Gord McLean | 49 | 0.24 | – |
| Total valid ballots cast | | 20,422 | 99.09 | – |
| Rejected, spoiled and declined | | 188 | 0.91 | |
| Turnout | | 20,610 | 65.03 | |
| Eligible voters | | 31,695 | | |
| New Democratic hold | | Swing | | −5.67 |
Source(s) Source: "44 - Edmonton-Strathcona, 2019 Alberta general election". officialresults.elections.ab.ca. Elections Alberta.

2015 Alberta general election: Edmonton-Mill Woods
| Party | Candidate | Votes | % | ±% |
|---|---|---|---|---|
| New Democratic | Christina Gray | 9,930 | 64.86% | 50.72% |
| Progressive Conservative | Sohail Quadri | 2,920 | 19.07% | -16.14% |
| Wildrose | Baljit Sall | 1,437 | 9.39% | -11.21% |
| Liberal | Roberto Maglalang | 850 | 5.55% | -15.74% |
| Independent | Aura Leddy | 129 | 0.84% | – |
| Communist | Naomi J. Rankin | 44 | 0.29% | – |
| Total | | 15,310 | – | – |
| Rejected, spoiled and declined | | 55 | 30 | 22 |
| Eligible electors / turnout | | 28,130 | 54.70% | 0.10% |
| New Democratic gain from Progressive Conservative | | Swing | | 17.09% |
Source(s) Source: "41 - Edmonton-Mill Woods, 2015 Alberta general election". officialresults.elections.ab.ca. Elections Alberta. Chief Electoral Officer (2016). 2015 General Election. A Report of the Chief Electoral Officer (PDF) (Report). Edmonton, Alta.: Elections Alberta.

2012 Alberta general election: Edmonton-Mill Creek
| Party | Candidate | Votes | % | ±% |
|---|---|---|---|---|
| Progressive Conservative | Gene Zwozdesky | 6,623 | 55.06% | 4.28% |
| Wildrose | Adam Corsaut | 2,193 | 18.23% | – |
| Liberal | Mike Butler | 1,640 | 13.63% | -16.42% |
| New Democratic | Evelinne Teichgraber | 1,336 | 11.11% | -2.39% |
| Alberta Party | Judy Wilson | 194 | 1.61% | – |
| Communist | Naomi Rankin | 43 | 0.36% | 0.05% |
| Total | | 12,029 | – | – |
| Rejected, spoiled and declined | | 117 | – | – |
| Eligible electors / turnout | | 25,250 | 48.10% | 2.44% |
| Progressive Conservative hold | | Swing | | 8.05% |
Source(s) Source: "Elections Alberta 2012 General Election". Elections Alberta. "40 - Edmonton-Mill Creek". officialresults.elections.ab.ca. Elections Alberta.

2008 Alberta general election: Edmonton-Mill Creek
| Party | Candidate | Votes | % | ±% |
|---|---|---|---|---|
| Progressive Conservative | Gene Zwozdesky | 6,857 | 50.78% | 8.70% |
| Liberal | Aman Gill | 4,058 | 30.05% | -5.55% |
| New Democratic | Stephen Anderson | 1,822 | 13.49% | -0.69% |
| Green | Glen Argan | 726 | 5.38% | – |
| Communist | Naomi Rankin | 41 | 0.30% | – |
| Total | | 13,504 | – | – |
| Rejected, spoiled and declined | | 90 | – | – |
| Eligible electors / turnout | | 29,773 | 45.66% | -3.89% |
| Progressive Conservative hold | | Swing | | 7.12% |
Source(s) Source: The Report on the March 3, 2008 Provincial General Election of the Twenty-seventh Legislative Assembly. Elections Alberta. May 28, 2020. pp. 320–323.

| 2004 Alberta general election results | | Turnout 45.04% | | Swing | |
| Affiliation | Candidate | Votes | % | Party | Personal |
| Liberal | Weslyn Mather | 5,012 | 48.01% | -0.96% | |
| Progressive Conservative | Naresh Bhardwaj | 2,992 | 28.66% | -15.15% | |
| New Democratic | Lloyd Nelson | 1,565 | 14.99% | 7.77% | |
| Alberta Alliance | Charles Relland | 829 | 7.94% | | |
| Communist | Naomi Rankin | 42 | 0.40% | * | |
| Total | | 10,440 | | | |
| Rejected, spoiled, and declined | | 62 | | | |
| Eligible electors / Turnout | | 23,319 | % | | |
| Liberal hold | | | | Swing −8.06% | |

2001 Alberta general election: Edmonton-Centre
| Party | Candidate | Votes | % | ±% |
|---|---|---|---|---|
| Liberal | Laurie Blakeman | 5,095 | 44.01% | 0.06% |
| Progressive Conservative | Don J. Weideman | 4,446 | 38.41% | 4.91% |
| New Democratic | David Eggen | 1,959 | 16.92% | -0.08% |
| Communist | Naomi Rankin | 76 | 0.66% | – |
| Total | | 11,576 | – | – |
| Rejected, spoiled, and declined | | 74 | – | – |
| Eligible electors / turnout | | 22,648 | 51.44% | -0.66% |
| Liberal hold | | Swing | | -2.43% |
Source(s) Source: "Edmonton-Centre Official Results 2001 Alberta general election". Alberta Heritage Community Foundation.

1997 Alberta general election: Edmonton-Riverview
| Party | Candidate | Votes | % |
|---|---|---|---|
| Liberal | Linda Sloan | 6,066 | 42.12 |
| Progressive Conservative | Gwen Harris | 5,122 | 35.57 |
| New Democratic | Donna Fong | 2,261 | 15.70 |
| Social Credit | David Prenoslo | 805 | 5.59 |
| Communist | Naomi Rankin | 61 | 0.42 |
| Total valid votes | | 14,402 | |
| Rejected, spoiled and declined | | 56 | |
| Registered electors | | 23,040 | |
| Turnout | | 14,458 | 62.75 |
| Liberal pickup new district. | | | |
Source(s) "1997 General Election". Elections Alberta. Archived from the original on February 14, 2012.

| 1993 Alberta general election results | | Turnout 63.02% | | Swing | |
| Affiliation | Candidate | Votes | % | Party | Personal |
| Liberal | Al Zariwny | 6,542 | 39.41% | 15.30% | |
| New Democratic | Barrie Chivers | 5,121 | 30.85% | -21.91% | |
| Progressive Conservative | Don Grimble | 4,071 | 24.52% | 8.33% | |
| Social Credit | Patrick Ellis | 460 | 2.77% | 0.37% | |
| Greens | Betty Paschen | 253 | 1.52% | -3.02% | |
| Natural Law | Benjamin Toane | 108 | 0.65% | | |
| Communist | Naomi Rankin | 47 | 0.28% | * | |
| Total | | 16,602 | | | |
| Rejected, spoiled and declined | | 60 | | | |
| Eligible electors / Turnout | | 26,440 | % | | |
| Liberal pickup from NDP | | | | Swing 18.61% | |

Party political offices
| Preceded by Norman Brudy | Leader of the Communist Party – Alberta; 1992 – present | Succeeded by Incumbent |
