= Linda Duncan =

Canadian lawyer and politician

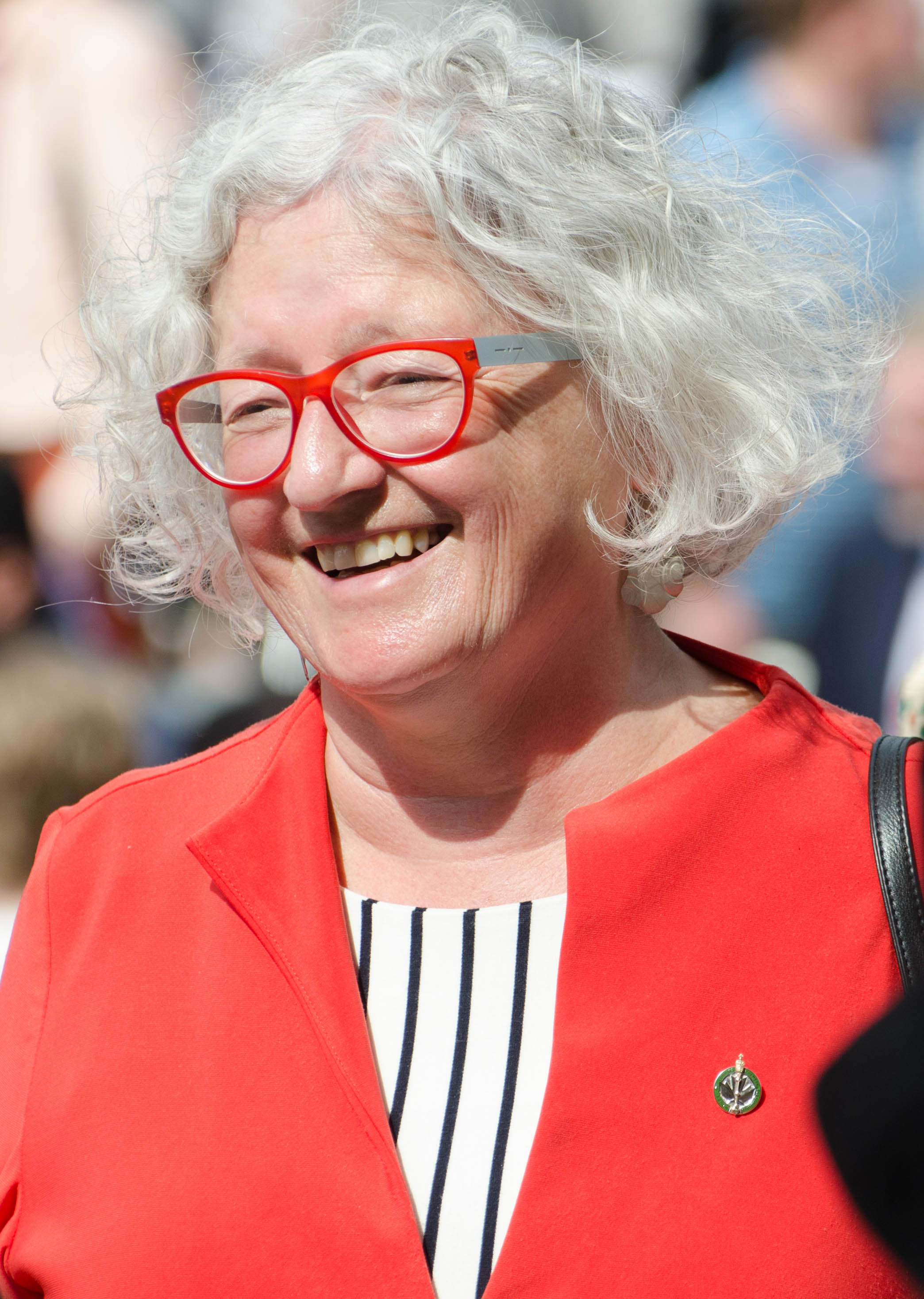
- Duncan in May 2015

Member of Parliament for Edmonton Strathcona as Edmonton—Strathcona, 2008–2015
- In office October 14, 2008 – October 20, 2019
- Preceded by: Rahim Jaffer
- Succeeded by: Heather McPherson

Personal details
- Born: Linda Francis Duncan; June 25, 1949 (age 77) Edmonton, Alberta, Canada
- Party: New Democratic Party
- Occupation: Lawyer; politician; environmental consultant

Linda Francis Duncan (born June 25, 1949) is a Canadian lawyer and former politician who served as the member of Parliament (MP) for the riding of Edmonton Strathcona from 2008 until 2019. A member of the New Democratic Party (NDP), Duncan was the only non-Conservative MP from Alberta from 2008 to 2015.

Before politics, Duncan founded and ran the Environmental Law Center and practised as an environmental lawyer, working in Edmonton until 1987 when she moved to Ottawa to work for Environment Canada. She then taught environmental law at Dalhousie Law School (now the Schulich School of Law) and advised the Government of Indonesia on environmental assessment and enforcement. She also spent time in Whitehorse working as an assistant deputy in the Yukon government, later consulting with Kluane First Nation and later in Montreal as Head Law and Enforcement for the NAFTA's Commission for Environmental Cooperation. Duncan also served on the Sierra Legal Defence Fund (now Ecojustice Canada) Board of Directors.

== Early life and career ==
Linda Duncan was born in Edmonton on June 25, 1949. Her father, Darcy Duncan, a second-generation lawyer, supported the family which included a brother, a younger sister and an older sister, along with their mother. She grew up in the south side of Edmonton. She attended the University of Alberta, graduating from its law school. With an interest in environmental law, she did not take the opportunity to join a law firm; instead she founded the Environmental Law Centre in 1982 to assist Albertans concerned with environmental and natural resources law.

In 1987, Thomas McMillan, the federal Minister of Environment, recruited Duncan to establish a new enforcement unit at Environment Canada. After a year in Ottawa, she moved to Whitehorse, where she worked as the assistant deputy Minister for Renewable Resources in the Yukon government. She moved to Montreal after she accepted a position helping lead the enforcement department of the Commission for Environmental Cooperation of the North American Free Trade Agreement. Through projects by the World Bank and the Asian Development Bank, she helped establish environmental law enforcement systems in Jamaica, Indonesia, and Bangladesh. During this time, in the 1990s, she earned a Master of Laws from Dalhousie Law School and taught several courses. Following the death of her father and two sisters she moved back to Edmonton in 1999.

On the local level, in addition to her work at the Environmental Law Centre in Edmonton, she worked on projects with the Edmonton Social Planning Council, Alberta's Clean Air Strategic Alliance, and the Canadian Council on Human Resources for the Environment Industry. She served on the Board of Directors of the Sierra Legal Defence Fund from 2001 to 2007.

Her family has had a cottage at Wabamun Lake since her youth and she has participated on the Lake Wabamun Enhancement and Protection Association. Acting as their vice-president during the August 2005 CN Rail oil spill, she was interviewed in the media on behalf of the land owners and lake users. With the association and the Sierra Legal Defence Fund she helped make a submission to the United Nations Environment Programme noting Canada was not enforcing the legally-binding Heavy Metals Protocol, making specific reference to high levels of mercury being released from coal-fired power plants.

== Political career ==
For the 39th Canadian federal election, in January 2006, Duncan ran as the New Democratic Party candidate for the riding of Edmonton—Strathcona. The contest was expected to be close, so in the final days of the campaign the party shifted resources there and the party leader, Jack Layton, visited the riding, the second time he did so during the campaign. Nevertheless, incumbent Conservative MP Rahim Jaffer, who had served since 1997, won his fourth mandate to represent the riding, with Duncan coming almost 5,000 votes behind him in second place.

=== 2008 election as MP ===
On January 19, 2007, Duncan accepted the NDP nomination in Edmonton—Strathcona, by acclamation, to seek election to Parliament again in the 40th Canadian federal election. The election campaign began in September 2008. To make environmental protection an election issue, Duncan and Jack Layton flew over the oil sands area noting environmental impact. Duncan made support for public health care, enforcement of environmental laws, and driving the economy with 'green jobs' priorities in her campaign. She drew upon support from a large volunteer network built since the last election and strategic voting from Liberal supporters. With the polls showing a close race, Jaffer launched an attack ad against Duncan.

On election night, October 14, the results showed Jaffer as the leader, by 1,000 votes with over half the polls reporting. Jaffer delivered his victory speech around 10 p.m. and several people had projected Jaffer had been reelected. However, late polls, which included residences around the University of Alberta, put Duncan ahead. Following a few days of silence and after his fiancée, fellow Conservative Member of Parliament Helena Guergis, flew to Edmonton and quietly married him, Jaffer conceded defeat to Duncan. With a 463-vote margin, Duncan became the only non-Conservative MP in Alberta, and the first NDP member from the province since Ross Harvey was elected at Edmonton East in 1988.

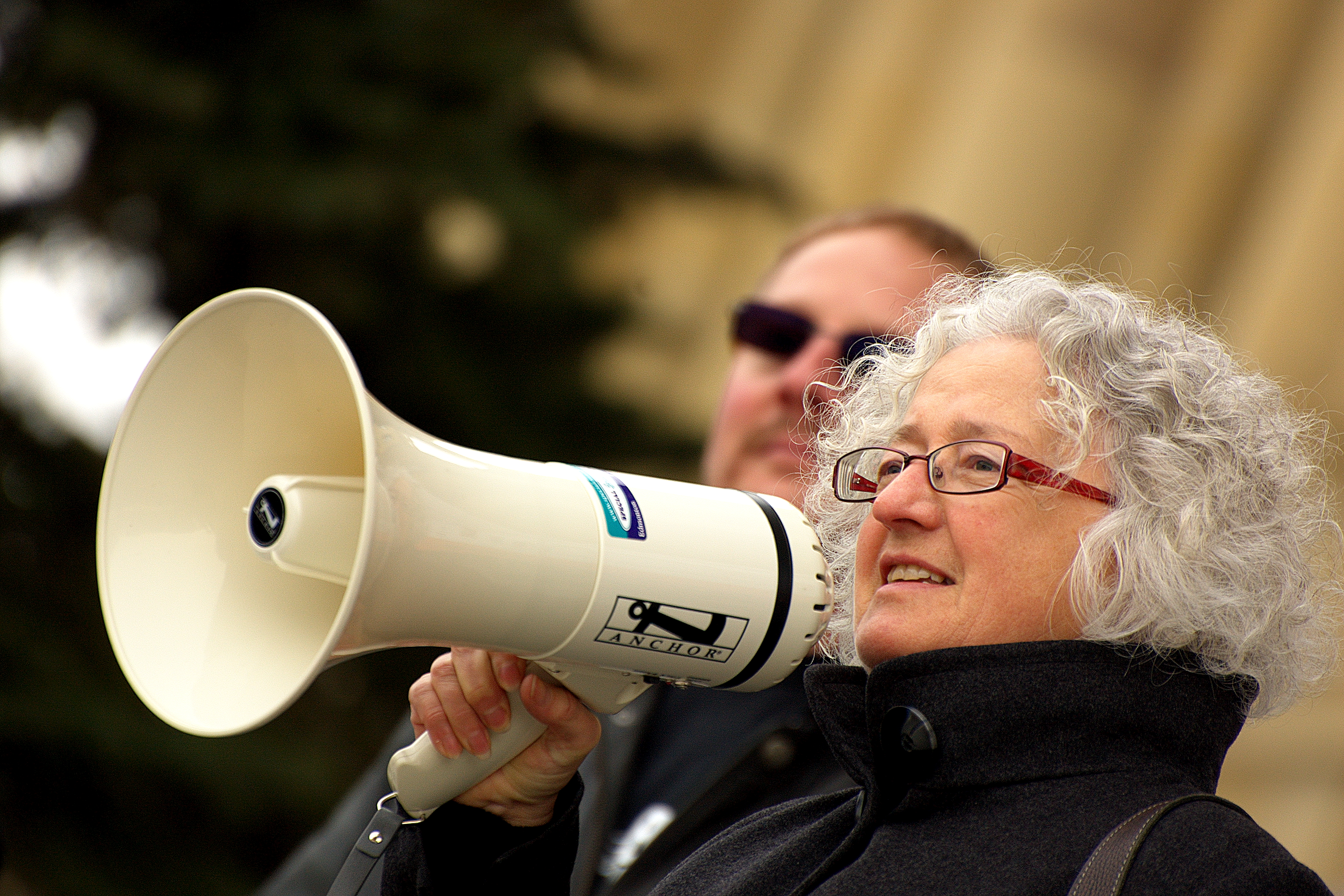
Linda Duncan at the Alberta Legislative Building participating in a rally organized by RETA against the Heartland Transmission project

During the subsequent 40th Canadian Parliament, Layton named Duncan to the NDP front bench as critic for the environment. In the Parliament's aborted first session, she strongly opposed the government's proposed fiscal update, especially the proposed changes to pay equity claims, four-year wage cap, and suspension of the right to strike for federal employees. She supported the proposed coalition government, in which arrangement the NDP and Bloc Québécois would have supported the Liberals, whose leader Stéphane Dion would have become Prime Minister. Duncan condemned Prime Minister Stephen Harper for labelling the coalition government as "treasonous" and "criminal". When Parliament resumed in January 2009, Duncan sat as a member of the House Standing Committee on Environment and Sustainable Development. She supported Ecojustice and the Sierra Club's lawsuit against the government's waiver of federal environmental assessment reviews on infrastructure projects arguing that it required an act of Parliament, rather than the Conservative government's Order in Council. She vocally supported the opposition's Corporate Accountability of Mining, Oil and Gas Corporations in Developing Countries Act that would hold Canadian companies accountable in Canadian courts for human rights and environmental abuses committed in other countries. Duncan introduced three bills into during the second and third sessions: the first proposing that the third Friday of February be declared National Hockey Day, the second establishing an Environmental Bill of Rights, and the third would have amended the Criminal Code to restrict the use of hand-held telecommunications devices while driving. On a private member's bill to abolish the federal gun registry, Linda Duncan was the only MP from Alberta who voted against abolishing the gun registry.

=== 2011 re-election ===
In the 2011 Canadian federal election, Duncan was re-elected, with over 50% of the vote in Edmonton—Strathcona, to the 41st Canadian Parliament. She introduced one private member's bill, entitled the National Literacy Policy Act (Bill C-327), which received first reading on October 5, 2011, but did not advance from there. The bill would have required the government adopt a policy for promoting literacy in Canada and take measures to enact the policy.

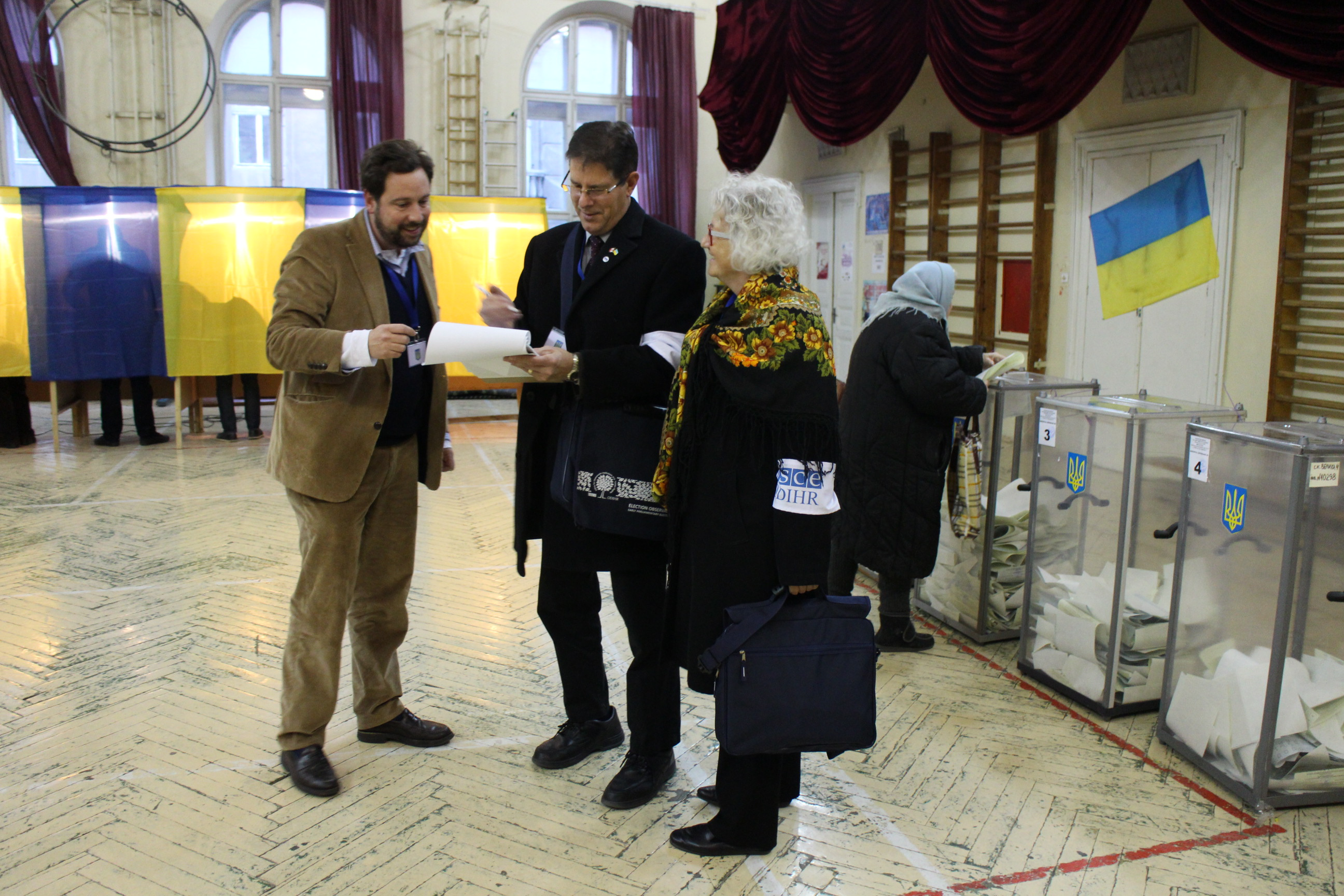
OSCE Parliamentary Assembly mission: Canadian MPs Mark Warawa (front, centre) and Linda Duncan (front, right) fill out observation forms at a polling station in Lviv to monitor the vote count at the 2014 Ukrainian parliamentary election.

In 2014, Linda Duncan introduced an Act to establish a Canadian Environmental Bill of Rights, Bill C-634, "whose provisions apply to all decisions that emanate from a federal source or are related to federal land or a federal work or undertaking".

Duncan spoke at a Jack Layton memorial on August 24, 2012. The event was billed as "Dear Jack" and she was joined by several other prominent figures. Early in the new parliament, Layton had died of cancer. Duncan had been suggested as a potential candidate in the leadership election, but she ruled herself out of running in September 2011 and later endorsed Paul Dewar.

She served as a critic in the Official Opposition Shadow Cabinet through the parliament's lifespan. She was responsible for Aboriginal Affairs until 2012, Public Works and Government Services until 2013, and finally Western Economic Diversification.

=== 2015 re-election and final term ===
Duncan was re-elected for a third term in the 2015 federal election. In the 42nd Canadian Parliament, party leader Tom Mulcair appointed her as the NDP critic for Transport.

In August 2018, Duncan announced that she would not seek re-election in the 43rd federal election.

Duncan endorsed Alberta MP Heather McPherson in the 2026 New Democratic Party leadership election.

== Electoral history ==
2006 Canadian federal election: Edmonton Strathcona
Party	Candidate	Votes	%	±%	Expenditures
Conservative	Rahim Jaffer	22,009	41.71	+2.31	$73,018.07
New Democratic	Linda Duncan	17,153	32.51	+8.70	$54,446.98
Liberal	Andy Hladyshevsky	9,391	17.80	–11.22	$72,479.99
Green	Cameron Wakefield	3,139	5.95	–0.55	$1,326.47
Progressive Canadian	Michael Fedeyko	582	1.10	–	none listed
Marijuana	Dave Dowling	390	0.74	–0.33	none listed
Marxist–Leninist	Kevan Hunter	106	0.20	–0.01	$15.75
Total valid votes/expense limit		52,770	99.72	–	$77,836.93
Total rejected ballots		148	0.28	–0.03	
Turnout		52,918	68.23	+2.57	
Eligible voters		77,560			
Conservative hold		Swing		+5.50	
Source: Elections Canada

2008 Canadian federal election: Edmonton Strathcona
Party	Candidate	Votes	%	±%	Expenditures
New Democratic	Linda Duncan	20,103	42.58	+10.08	$70,896.93
Conservative	Rahim Jaffer	19,640	41.60	–0.11	$77,743.57
Liberal	Claudette Roy	4,279	9.06	–8.73	$71,903.46
Green	Jane Thrall	3,040	6.44	+0.49	$3,801.05
Marxist–Leninist	Kevan Hunter	147	0.31	+0.11	none listed
Total valid votes/expense limit		47,209	99.79	–	$82,491.89
Total rejected ballots		99	0.21	–0.07	
Turnout		47,308	62.86	–5.37	
Eligible voters		75,254			
New Democratic gain from Conservative		Swing		+5.09	
Source: Elections Canada

2011 Canadian federal election: Edmonton Strathcona
Party	Candidate	Votes	%	±%	Expenditures
New Democratic	Linda Duncan	26,093	53.55	+10.96	$83,591.54
Conservative	Ryan Hastman	19,762	40.55	–1.05	$77,930.25
Liberal	Matthew Sinclair	1,372	2.82	–6.25	$16,742.47
Green	Andrew Fehr	1,119	2.30	–4.14	$217.58
Independent	Kyle Murphy	206	0.42	–	$1,915.44
Marxist–Leninist	Kevan Hunter	91	0.19	–0.12	none listed
Independent	Christopher White	87	0.18	–	$880.11
Total valid votes/expense limit		48,730	99.75	–	$84,504.87
Total rejected ballots		124	0.25	+0.04	
Turnout		48,854	66.52	+3.66	
Eligible voters		73,444			
New Democratic hold		Swing		+6.01	
Source: Elections Canada

2015 Canadian federal election: Edmonton Strathcona
Party	Candidate	Votes	%	±%	Expenditures
New Democratic	Linda Duncan	24,446	43.96	–9.75	$87,241.42
Conservative	Len Thom	17,395	31.28	–9.04	$36,812.49
Liberal	Eleanor Olszewski	11,524	20.73	+17.87	$62,711.39
Green	Jacob K. Binnema	1,278	2.30	–0.04	$1,924.74
Libertarian	Malcolm Stinson	311	0.56	–	$1,599.80
Pirate	Ryan Bromsgrove	201	0.36	–	$1,083.76
Rhinoceros	Donovan Eckstrom	133	0.24	–	none listed
Independent	Chris Jones	116	0.21	–	none listed
Independent	Andrew Schurman	107	0.19	–	$455.26
Marxist–Leninist	Dougal MacDonald	93	0.17	–0.02	none listed
Total valid votes/expense limit		55,604	99.61	–	$208,715.39
Total rejected ballots		217	0.39	–	
Turnout		55,821	70.99	–	
Eligible voters		78,635			
New Democratic hold		Swing		–0.35	
Source: Elections Canada
