= William Skoreyko =

Canadian businessperson and politician

Member of Parliament for Edmonton East
- In office 1958–1979
- Preceded by: Ambrose Holowach
- Succeeded by: William Yurko

Personal details
- Born: December 8, 1922 Edmonton, Alberta
- Died: September 28, 1987 (aged 64) Edmonton, Alberta
- Party: Progressive Conservative Party of Canada
- Occupation: Businessman

William Skoreyko (December 8, 1922 – September 28, 1987) was a businessman, service station owner, and politician from Alberta, Canada.

== Early life ==
Skoreyko was born on December 8, 1922, in Edmonton. He was the son of two Ukrainian immigrants from Bukovnya, Michael Skoreyko and Helen Skoreyko. In 1940, upon the outbreak of the World War II, he joined the Canadian Army. After the war ended, he studied in Edmonton and Senlac in Saskatchewan, receiving a degree in business management from the latter city.

Prior to being elected to the House of Commons, he worked as a partner at the Belvedere Husky Service Garage, then became President of Belvedere Insurance Services Limited.

== Political career ==
Skoreyko first ran for election to the House of Commons of Canada in the district of Edmonton East in the 1958 federal election; he defeated incumbent Social Credit MP Ambrose Holowach. He and 207 other Progressive Conservatives (PCs) were elected. He began his parliamentary career as a backbencher in Prime Minister John Diefenbaker's caucus.

Although he never ranked highly in his party's hierarchy or that of the House of Commons, Skoreyko has a unique electoral history as regards his opponents, several of whom had been or would later be successful politicians in other offices. In the 1962 federal election, which was hotly contested both in Edmonton East and nationally, he defeated Liberal candidate John Decore, former MP for Vegreville, and Social Credit candidate Lucien Maynard, former Attorney-General of Alberta.

In the 1963 election, Skoreyko again defeated Maynard, as well as New Democratic Party candidate Ivor Dent, who later became mayor of Edmonton. In 1965, his Social Credit opponent was a young Preston Manning, the son of Alberta premier Ernest Manning and future leader of the Reform Party of Canada. He retired at the 1979 Canadian federal election undefeated after serving seven consecutive terms, in the 24th, 25th, 26th, 27th, 28th, 29th, and 30th Canadian Parliaments.
