= New Democratic Party Shadow Cabinet of the 40th Parliament of Canada =

NDP Shadow Cabinet of the 40th Canadian Parliament
- Fourth party of the House of Commons
- 2008–2011
- Date formed: November 17, 2008
- Date dissolved: March 26, 2011

People and organizations
- Party leader: Jack Layton
- Deputy party leaders: Libby Davies and Thomas Mulcair
- House Leader: Libby Davies
- Member party: New Democratic Party
- Status in legislature: Opposition 37 / 308

History
- Election: 2008
- Legislature term: 40th Parliament of Canada
- Predecessor: 2007–2008 NDP Shadow Cabinet
- Successor: 2011–2015 Official Opposition Shadow Cabinet

This is a list of members of the New Democratic Party Shadow Cabinet of the 40th Canadian parliament. Positions in the shadow cabinet were announced on November 17, 2008, and include all 37 members of the New Democratic Party caucus in the House of Commons of Canada except Joe Comartin who was running for election as Speaker of the House of Commons of Canada when the shadow cabinet was appointed.

Portfolio	Critic	Duration
Leader (Critic for the Prime Minister of Canada)	Hon. Jack Layton	2003–2011
Intergovernmental Affairs	Hon. Jack Layton	2007–2011
Deputy Leader	Libby Davies	2004–
Deputy Leader	Thomas Mulcair	2007–
Agriculture and Agri-Food	Alex Atamanenko	2006–2011
Atlantic Canada Opportunities Agency	Jack Harris	2008–2011
Canadian Heritage and Status of Women (Canadian Heritage)	Charlie Angus	2008–2011
Status of Women	Irene Mathyssen	2007–2011
Citizenship and Immigration	Olivia Chow	2007–2011
Economic Development Agency of Canada for the Regions of Quebec	Thomas Mulcair	2007–2011
Environment	Linda Duncan	2008–2011
Finance	Thomas Mulcair	2007–2011
Fisheries and Oceans	Peter Stoffer	1997–2011
Foreign Affairs	Paul Dewar	2007–
Health	Megan Leslie	2010–2011
Human Resources and Social Development	Tony Martin	2004–2011
Human Resources and Social Development (Employment Insurance)	Yvon Godin	2007–2011
Indian Affairs and Northern Development (Aboriginals)	Jean Crowder	2006–2011
Indian Affairs and Northern Development (Northern Development and Sovereignty)	Dennis Bevington	2006–2011
Industry	Brian Masse	2008–2011
International Cooperation	John Rafferty	2008–2011
International Trade; Pacific Gateway and the Vancouver-Whistler Olympics	Peter Julian	2004–2011
Justice and Shadow Attorney General	Libby Davies	2008–2009
Justice and Shadow Attorney General	Joe Comartin	2009–
Labour	Chris Charlton	2008–2011
House Leader	Libby Davies	2003–2011
National Defence	Jack Harris	2006–
National Revenue	Carol Hughes	2008–2011
Natural Resources	Nathan Cullen	2008–2011
Public Safety	Jack Harris	2008–2011
Public Works and Government Services and Crown Corporations	Pat Martin	2008–2011
Transport, Infrastructure and Communities	Dennis Bevington	2008–2011
Treasury Board	Pat Martin	2008–2011
Veterans Affairs	Peter Stoffer	2004–
Western Economic Diversification	Don Davies	2008–2011
Atlantic Gateway	Jack Harris	2008–
Food Security and Agriculture	Malcolm Allen	2008–2011
Finance	Chris Charlton	2008–2011
Citizenship and Immigration	Don Davies	2008–2011
Industry (Mines)	Claude Gravelle	2008–2011
Energy (Atlantic Region)	Jack Harris	2008–2011
First Nations, Métis, and Inuit Affairs (Health)	Carol Hughes	2008–2011
Environment (National Parks)	Bruce Hyer	2008–
Environment (Water)	Bruce Hyer	2008–2011
Environment (Climate Change)	Bruce Hyer	2008–2011
Fisheries (West Coast)	Peter Julian	2008–2011
First Nations, Métis and Inuit Affairs (Urban Issues)	Megan Leslie	2008–2011
Justice	Megan Leslie	2008–2011
Public Works (E-government)	Jim Maloway	2008–2011
Industry (Steel)	Wayne Marston	2004–2011
Agriculture (Canada Wheat Board) and Energy (Energy Retrofits)	Pat Martin	2008–2011
Public Safety	Irene Mathyssen	2008–2011
Industry (Forestry)	John Rafferty	2008–2011
Canadian Heritage (Canadian Broadcasting Corporation)	John Rafferty	2008–2011
Cultural Industries	John Rafferty	2008–2011
Foreign Affairs (Americas)	Denise Savoie	2008–2011
Industry (Shipbuilding)	Peter Stoffer	1997–2010
Critics for Special Ministerial Responsibilities
Democratic Reform	David Christopherson	2008–
Federal Economic Development Initiative for Northern Ontario	Claude Gravelle	2008–2011
La Francophonie and Official Languages	Claude Gravelle	2008–2011
Shadow Federal Interlocutor for Métis and Non-Status Indians	Jean Crowder	2006–2011
Sport	Glenn Thibeault	2006–2011
Critics for Policy Areas for which there is no specific minister
Skills Training and Apprenticeships	Malcolm Allen	2008–2011
Digital Issues	Charlie Angus	2008–
Youth	Niki Ashton	2008–2011
Rural Development	Niki Ashton	2008–2011
Community Development	Niki Ashton	2008–2011
Food Security	Alex Atamanenko	2008–2011
Public Accounts	David Christopherson	2005–
Canada Post	David Christopherson	2008–2011
Multiculturalism	Don Davies	2008–
Vancouver Region	Don Davies	2008–2011
Substance Abuse	Libby Davies	2008–2011
Prostitution Issues	Libby Davies	2008–2011
Small Business	Bruce Hyer	2008–2011
Tourism	Bruce Hyer	2008–2011
Post-Secondary Education	Megan Leslie	2008–2009
Literacy	Megan Leslie	2008–2009
Science and Technology	Jim Maloway	2008–2011
Seniors and Pensions and Human Rights	Wayne Marston	2008–
Housing	Denise Savoie	2008–2011
Homelessness	Denise Savoie	2008–2011
Canada Mortgage and Housing Corporation	Denise Savoie	2008–2011
Privacy and Ethics	Bill Siksay	2008–2011
Gay, Lesbian, Bisexual, Transsexual, and Transgender Issues	Bill Siksay	2008–2011
Consumer Protection	Glenn Thibeault	2008–
Persons with Disabilities	Judy Wasylycia-Leis	2008–
Caucus roles
NDP Whip	Yvon Godin	
NDP Caucus Chair	Judy Wasylycia-Leis	2004–2009
NDP Caucus Chair	Jean Crowder	2009–2011

The NDP does not have a leader in the Senate of Canada since it opposes the existence of that body.

== See also ==
- Cabinet of Canada
- Official Opposition (Canada)
- Shadow Cabinet
- Official Opposition Shadow Cabinet (Canada)
- Bloc Québécois Shadow Cabinet
