= Patrick Harvey Ashby =

Canadian politician

Member of Parliament for Edmonton East
- In office 1945–1949
- Preceded by: Cora Taylor Casselman
- Succeeded by: Albert Frederick Macdonald

Personal details
- Born: October 17, 1890 Sussex, England
- Died: January 25, 1985 (aged 94) Campbell River, British Columbia, Canada
- Party: Social Credit Party of Canada

Patrick Harvey Ashby (October 17, 1890 – January 25, 1985) was a farmer, rancher, father, Hudson's Bay employee, soldier, sniper and Canadian federal politician. He was born in Sussex, England.

Ashby joined the Canadian Forces and served overseas in World War I from 1914 to 1918.

Ashby first ran for a seat in the House of Commons of Canada as a candidate from the Social Credit candidate in the 1945 federal election. He defeated incumbent Member of Parliament Cora Taylor Casselman. Ashby left the Social Credit Party at the dissolution of Parliament on June 26, 1949. He ran for re-election in the 1949 federal election under the Independent Social Credit banner. Ashby was defeated by Liberal candidate Albert Frederick Macdonald, and did not attempt to return to federal politics. He died in Campbell River, British Columbia in 1985.
