= Cora Taylor Casselman =

Canadian politician (1888–1964)

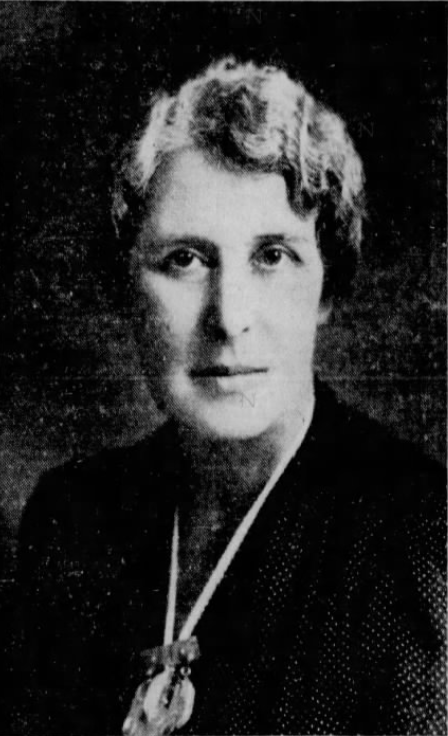
- Cora Taylor Casselman, 1941

Member of Parliament for Edmonton East
- In office 1941–1945
- Preceded by: Frederick Clayton Casselman
- Succeeded by: Patrick Harvey Ashby

Personal details
- Born: October 18, 1888 Tara, Ontario
- Died: September 6, 1964 (aged 75) Edmonton, Alberta
- Party: Liberal Party of Canada

Cora Taylor Casselman (October 18, 1888 – September 6, 1964) was a Canadian federal politician.

She was elected to represent the electoral district of Edmonton East in the House of Commons of Canada from 1941 to 1945. A member of the Liberal Party of Canada, she was the fourth woman ever elected to the House of Commons and the first from the province of Alberta.

Casselman was elected to the House in a byelection on June 2, 1941, succeeding her late husband Frederick Casselman. She served until 1945, when she was defeated in the 1945 federal election by Social Credit candidate Patrick Harvey Ashby. On March 13, 1944, she became the first woman to be speaker in the House of Commons, albeit temporarily. She was part of the Canadian delegation at the founding of the United Nations.

She later stood as an Alberta Liberal Party candidate in Edmonton in the 1955 provincial election in Alberta, but was not elected.
