= Albert Frederick Macdonald =

Canadian politician

Member of Parliament for Edmonton East
- In office 1949–1953
- Preceded by: Patrick Harvey Ashby
- Succeeded by: Ambrose Holowach

Personal details
- Born: June 13, 1901 Winnipeg, Manitoba, Canada
- Died: August 20, 1976 (aged 75)
- Party: Liberal Party of Canada

Albert Frederick Macdonald (June 13, 1901 – August 20, 1976) was a railway employee, worked as a cashier and served as a Canadian federal politician.

Macdonald ran for the House of Commons of Canada as a candidate for the Liberal Party in the 1949 federal election. He defeated incumbent Member of Parliament Patrick Ashby to win the Edmonton East electoral district. Macdonald served one term in office before being defeated by Ambrose Holowach in the 1953 federal election.
