= William Samuel Hall =

Canadian politician

Member of Parliament for Edmonton East
- In office 1935–1938
- Preceded by: Ambrose Bury
- Succeeded by: Orvis A. Kennedy

Personal details
- Born: November 8, 1871 Mount Forest, Ontario, Canada
- Died: January 26, 1938 (aged 66)
- Party: Social Credit Party of Canada
- Children: Manly P. Hall

William Samuel Hall (November 8, 1871 – January 26, 1938) was a dentist and a Canadian federal politician. He was the father of author and mystic Manly Palmer Hall.

Hall was elected to the House of Commons of Canada as a Social Credit candidate. He defeated 5 other candidates to win his seat. Hall died two years into his term vacating his seat on January 26, 1938.
