= Orvis A. Kennedy =

Canadian politician

Member of Parliament for Edmonton East
- In office 1938–1940
- Preceded by: William Samuel Hall
- Succeeded by: Frederick Clayton Casselman

Personal details
- Born: August 5, 1907 Dryden, Ontario
- Died: April 2, 1997 (aged 89) Edmonton, Alberta
- Party: Social Credit Party of Canada

Orvis A. Kennedy (August 5, 1907 – April 2, 1997) was an executive, manager, organizer, salesman and a Canadian federal politician. He was Member of Parliament for Edmonton East from 1938 to 1940.

Kennedy helped found the Social Credit party in Alberta in 1935. He ran as a candidate three years later and was elected to the House of Commons of Canada as a Social Credit candidate in a by-election held on March 21, 1938. He defeated two other candidates including former Calgary mayor and one-time Liberal MLA Robert Colin Marshall.

Kennedy ran as a New Democracy candidate and was defeated in the 1940 Canadian federal election by Liberal candidate Frederick Casselman.

After his defeat in the 1940 election he became a perennial candidate running in almost every federal election under the Social Credit banner in various federal electoral districts in Alberta until 1963. He also served as chief campaign organizer for Social Credit parties on the provincial level in various elections.

Kennedy had three sons, including Reverend Ernest Kennedy.
