= Ambrose Holowach =

Canadian politician (1914–1993)

Member of the Legislative Assembly of Alberta
- In office 1959–1971
- Succeeded by: Gordon Miniely
- Constituency: Edmonton Centre

Member of Parliament
- In office 1953–1958
- Preceded by: Albert Frederick Macdonald
- Succeeded by: William Skoreyko
- Constituency: Edmonton East

Personal details
- Born: July 22, 1914 Edmonton, Alberta, Canada
- Died: February 27, 1993 (aged 78) Edmonton, Alberta, Canada
- Party: Social Credit Party of Canada; Alberta Social Credit Party

Ambrose Holowach (July 22, 1914 – February 27, 1993) was a Canadian businessman, soldier during World War II, member of the Canadian Parliament and member of the Alberta legislative assembly.

== Family ==
Ambrose's father, Samuel Holowach, was an ethnically Ukrainian immigrant from the Austro-Hungarian Empire. Same homesteaded east of Edmonton before moving into the city to start a laundry business. Ambrose's brother Walter studied violin in Vienna and played in the Edmonton Symphony Orchestra. A horse chestnut tree was planted behind the family business from seed brought from Vienna by Walter. It became a local landmark known as the "Holowach Tree"; saved from redevelopment in 1998, it was still standing as of 2023.

== Federal political career ==
Holowach first ran for a seat in the House of Commons of Canada as a candidate of the Social Credit party in the 1949 federal election. He was defeated by Liberal candidate Albert Frederick Macdonald.

Holowach ran again in the 1953 federal election and this time defeated Macdonald. He remained an MP until Progressive Conservative candidate William Skoreyko defeated him in the 1958 federal election.

== Provincial political career ==
Before he became an MP, Holowach ran for a seat in the Legislative Assembly of Alberta in 1952. He ran in the seven-member electoral district of Edmonton. In the First Count he came in sixth, but without the quota required to win a seat. He would have won a seat if his vote total had increased adequately through transfers conducted under STV, but he received fewer vote transfers than another SC candidate - Edgar Gerhart - who was elected instead of Holowach.

He made another attempt at entering the Alberta Legislature after losing his seat in the House of Commons. He was elected in the Edmonton Centre district in the 1959 general election. In 1962, Premier Ernest Manning appointed him to the Executive Council of Alberta; he became Provincial Secretary. In 1964 he attracted much attention when he said in the legislature that he didn't think Alberta needed a distinct flag. Shortly before the 1971 general election, he was appointed Minister of Culture, Youth and Recreation by Premier Harry Strom.

At the 1971 election, Holowach left the Edmonton Centre district and ran for re-election in the Edmonton-Highlands district. He lost to Progressive Conservative candidate David Thomas King. Holowach ran against King again in the 1975 election but was again defeated.
