= Spedden =

- Hamlet
- Location of Spedden Spedden (Canada)
- Coordinates: 54°08′19″N 111°43′32″W
- Country: Canada
- Province: Alberta
- Region: Central Alberta
- Census division: 12
- Municipal district: Smoky Lake County

Government
  - Type: Unincorporated
  - Governing body: Smoky Lake County Council

Population (1991)
  - Total: 56
- Time zone: UTC−06:00 (Alberta Time)
- Area codes: 780, 587, 825

Spedden is a hamlet in central Alberta, Canada within Smoky Lake County. It is located 0.3 kilometres (0.19 mi) north of Highway 36, approximately 106 kilometres (66 mi) southwest of Cold Lake.

== History ==
Spedden was named after one of the original surveyors who died in the area in 1919. Previously it bore the name Cache Lake.

Spedden received a Canadian National rail-line in 1919, and by the end of the year St. Paul residents pushed the line another 50 kilometres through Ashmont to their locality.

== Demographics ==
Population history of Spedden
Year	Pop.	±%
1941	114	—
1951	104	−8.8%
1956	94	−9.6%
1961	123	+30.9%
1966	95	−22.8%
1971	71	−25.3%
1976	66	−7.0%
1981	49	−25.8%
1986	38	−22.4%
1991	56	+47.4%
Source: Statistics Canada

Spedden recorded a population of 56 in the 1991 Census of Population conducted by Statistics Canada.

== See also ==
- List of communities in Alberta
- List of hamlets in Alberta
