= Rahim Jaffer =

Canadian politician (born 1971)

Member of Parliament for Edmonton—Strathcona
- In office 2 June 1997 – 14 October 2008
- Preceded by: Hugh Hanrahan
- Succeeded by: Linda Duncan

Personal details
- Born: Rahim Nizar Jaffer; 15 December 1971 (age 54) Kampala, Uganda
- Party: Conservative (since 2003)
- Other political affiliations: Reform (1997–2000); Canadian Alliance (2000–2003)
- Spouse: Helena Guergis
- Children: 1
- Education: University of Ottawa
- Profession: Politician, businessman

Rahim Nizar Jaffer (Urdu: رحيم جعفر; born 15 December 1971) is a Canadian politician. He served in the House of Commons of Canada from 1997 to 2008, representing the Alberta riding of Edmonton—Strathcona as a member of the Conservative Party. He was the first Muslim elected to the Canadian Parliament. Jaffer became embroiled in a national controversy in 2010 after he appeared to receive "a break" from the justice system after being charged with drunk driving and possession of cocaine.

== Early life ==
Jaffer is an Ismaili Muslim of Indian Gujarati descent. While young, Jaffer and his family emigrated to Canada to escape further persecution in Uganda after the government of Idi Amin confiscated their business and their home. They settled in Edmonton.

Jaffer completed a Bachelor of Arts degree at the University of Ottawa in political science and economics. He took his degree in the French language. He also served as a legislative assistant in the House of Commons. After completing his degree, he returned to Edmonton, where he operated a successful coffee shop in the heart of the Old Strathcona district. In 2009, Rahim received his Master of Business Administration from the University of Alberta.

== Political career ==
Jaffer was elected to the House of Commons as the Member of Parliament (MP) for Edmonton—Strathcona in the federal election on 2 June 1997, at the age of 25. He won the seat as a member of the Reform Party of Canada (later the Canadian Alliance, which later merged with the Progressive Conservatives to form the Conservative Party). Jaffer was re-elected in 2000.

In 2001, Matthew Johnston, an aide to Jaffer, impersonated him during a radio interview that Jaffer was himself unable to attend. Jaffer subsequently apologized for the stunt in the House of Commons and was suspended from his caucus position for several months. The incident was parodied by This Hour Has 22 Minutes, Rick Mercer performed a rap based on Eminem's "The Real Slim Shady", with the lyrics "Will the real Rahim Jaffer please stand up?"

In the 2006 election, Jaffer was re-elected to serve a fourth term as the Member of Parliament for Edmonton—Strathcona. On 8 February 2006, Prime Minister Stephen Harper named him chair of the Conservative caucus.

Jaffer lost his seat in the 2008 election after he was defeated by New Democrat Linda Duncan. Jaffer was initially reluctant to concede defeat but finally did so on 16 October after the results were officially validated by the riding returning officer.

In 2009, Jaffer expressed interest in re-seeking the Conservative nomination for Edmonton—Strathcona at the next election. However, he declined to do so after it was claimed that he was shut out of nomination process.

Jaffer was once voted "laziest MP" in an annual survey by The Hill Times.

In June 2025, Jaffer entered the mayoral race of the 2025 Edmonton municipal election, however ultimately came in fifth place with 4.3% of the vote.

== Personal life ==
On 15 October 2008, Jaffer married his former caucus colleague Helena Guergis, by then a Cabinet minister. This was her second marriage and his first.

Jaffer and Guergis became engaged in October 2007. Reportedly at the initiative of Guergis, the couple decided on the morning after the election to scrap their planned wedding date and to get married immediately. Their wedding was presided over by Ian McClelland, a former Member of Parliament and a licensed marriage commissioner, later that same day at McClelland's home. The marriage was witnessed by the couple's parliamentary colleague James Rajotte and by one of Jaffer's cousins. In December 2010, the couple had a boy.

=== Arrest and conviction ===
On 11 September 2009, Jaffer was stopped late at night by the Ontario Provincial Police while he was traveling at a rate of 93 km/h in a 50 km/h zone in Palgrave, Ontario, close to his wife's riding. The officer noticed a smell of alcohol on Jaffer's breath, and after administering a breathalyzer test, found him to be over the Ontario legal blood-alcohol limit of .08. Jaffer's driver's licence was suspended for 90 days, and he was charged with drunk driving and possession of an undisclosed quantity of cocaine. The location of the cocaine was a source of contention between police and Jaffer. The arresting officer stated that the drugs were found in Jaffer's pants pocket, whereas Jaffer's defence team claimed it was in his suit jacket. Earlier in the evening, he had met in Toronto with Nazim Gillani, a businessman. Gillani claimed he was a banker for the Hells Angels.

During the 2008 election, Jaffer's campaign approved radio ads accusing NDP leader Jack Layton of being soft on marijuana use. Jaffer had been scheduled to appear in court in Orangeville, Ontario on 19 October 2009. On 9 March 2010, Jaffer pleaded guilty to one charge of careless driving and was sentenced to a fine of $500. The cocaine possession and drunk driving charges were withdrawn. Justice Doug Maund told Jaffer "I’m sure you can recognize a break when you see one." The sentence and the dropping of the more serious charges triggered outrage across Canada, as well as more extensive investigation of events leading up to the incident prompting the arrest, which led to allegations several escorts also attended his dinner with Gillani.

== Electoral record ==
=== Federal ===
1997 Canadian federal election: Edmonton Strathcona
Party	Candidate	Votes	%	±%	Expenditures
Reform	Rahim Jaffer	20,605	41.30	+1.97	$58,003
Liberal	Ginette Rodger	17,654	35.39	–3.13	$58,244
New Democratic	Jean McBean	7,251	14.53	+9.48	$42,936
Progressive Conservative	Edo Nyland	3,614	7.24	–4.06	$10,183
Green	Karina Gregory	406	0.81	+0.24	$520
Natural Law	Maury Shapka	153	0.31	–0.27	none listed
Independent	Naomi Rankin	115	0.23	+0.05	$1,732
Canadian Action	J. Alex Ford	92	0.18	–	$845
Total valid votes		49,890	99.80		
Total rejected ballots		101	0.20	–0.02	
Turnout		49,991	62.74	–2.11	
Eligible voters		79,680			
Reform hold		Swing		+2.55	
Source: Elections Canada

2000 Canadian federal election: Edmonton Strathcona
Party	Candidate	Votes	%	±%	Expenditures
Alliance	Rahim Jaffer	23,463	42.00	+0.70	$57,365
Liberal	Jonathan Dai	17,816	31.90	–3.49	$48,430
New Democratic	Hélène Lortie-Narayana	8,256	14.78	+0.25	$25,883
Progressive Conservative	Gregory Toogood	5,047	9.04	+1.79	$4,252
Marijuana	Ken Kirk	814	1.46	–	$149
Canadian Action	Kesa Rose Semenchuk	299	0.54	+0.35	$1,485
Marxist–Leninist	Kevan Hunter	164	0.29	–	$275
Total valid votes		55,859	99.68		
Total rejected ballots		182	0.32	+0.12	
Turnout		56,041	62.79	+0.05	
Eligible voters		89,248			
Alliance hold		Swing		+2.10	
Source: Elections Canada

2004 Canadian federal election: Edmonton Strathcona
Party	Candidate	Votes	%	±%	Expenditures
Conservative	Rahim Jaffer	19,089	39.40	–11.64	$65,390.20
Liberal	Debby Carlson	14,057	29.01	–2.88	$67,437.17
New Democratic	Minister Faust	11,535	23.81	+9.02	$44,181.99
Green	Cameron Wakefield	3,146	6.49	–	$2,855.80
Marijuana	Dave Dowling	519	1.07	–0.39	none listed
Marxist–Leninist	Kevan Hunter	103	0.21	–0.08	$26.75
Total valid votes/expense limit		48,449	99.69	–	$74,517.10
Total rejected ballots		150	0.31	–0.01	
Turnout		48,599	65.66	+2.87	
Eligible voters		74,014			
Conservative hold		Swing		+7.26	
Source: Elections Canada

2006 Canadian federal election: Edmonton Strathcona
Party	Candidate	Votes	%	±%	Expenditures
Conservative	Rahim Jaffer	22,009	41.71	+2.31	$73,018.07
New Democratic	Linda Duncan	17,153	32.51	+8.70	$54,446.98
Liberal	Andy Hladyshevsky	9,391	17.80	–11.22	$72,479.99
Green	Cameron Wakefield	3,139	5.95	–0.55	$1,326.47
Progressive Canadian	Michael Fedeyko	582	1.10	–	none listed
Marijuana	Dave Dowling	390	0.74	–0.33	none listed
Marxist–Leninist	Kevan Hunter	106	0.20	–0.01	$15.75
Total valid votes/expense limit		52,770	99.72	–	$77,836.93
Total rejected ballots		148	0.28	–0.03	
Turnout		52,918	68.23	+2.57	
Eligible voters		77,560			
Conservative hold		Swing		+5.50	
Source: Elections Canada

2008 Canadian federal election: Edmonton Strathcona
Party	Candidate	Votes	%	±%	Expenditures
New Democratic	Linda Duncan	20,103	42.58	+10.08	$70,896.93
Conservative	Rahim Jaffer	19,640	41.60	–0.11	$77,743.57
Liberal	Claudette Roy	4,279	9.06	–8.73	$71,903.46
Green	Jane Thrall	3,040	6.44	+0.49	$3,801.05
Marxist–Leninist	Kevan Hunter	147	0.31	+0.11	none listed
Total valid votes/expense limit		47,209	99.79	–	$82,491.89
Total rejected ballots		99	0.21	–0.07	
Turnout		47,308	62.86	–5.37	
Eligible voters		75,254			
New Democratic gain from Conservative		Swing		+5.09	
Source: Elections Canada

=== Municipal ===
In the 2025 Edmonton municipal election, Jaffer ran for mayor of the city. He finished fifth in the race won by Mayor Andrew Knack. Jaffer received 8980 votes, and 4.34% of the vote.

Political offices
Preceded by Andy Savoy	Chair, Government Caucus in the Parliament of Canada; 2006–2008	Succeeded by Guy Lauzon
Preceded by Norman Doyle	Chair, Conservative Caucus in the Parliament of Canada; 2006–2008	Succeeded by Guy Lauzon
