= Judy Bethel =

Canadian politician (1943–2025)

Member of Parliament for Edmonton East
- In office 25 October 1993 – 1 June 1997
- Preceded by: Ross Harvey
- Succeeded by: Peter Goldring

Personal details
- Born: 24 August 1943 Winnipeg, Manitoba, Canada
- Died: 11 March 2025 (aged 81)
- Party: Liberal Party of Canada
- Profession: Educator, investment broker

Judith Claire Bethel (24 August 1943 – 11 March 2025) was a Canadian politician who served as a member of the House of Commons for the Edmonton East electoral district from 1993 to 1997. She was born in Winnipeg, Manitoba.

As part of the Liberal Party of Canada, Bethel was elected in the 1993 federal election. She served in the 35th Canadian Parliament, after which she was unsuccessful in gaining a second term in office. She was defeated by the Reform party's Peter Goldring in the 1997 federal election. Since then, Bethel made no further attempts to return to Parliament.

Her son John was the Liberal nominee for the riding in the 2004 election but was unsuccessful. She died on 11 March 2025, at the age of 81.
