= William Yurko =

Canadian politician

William Yurko FCIC

Member of Parliament for Edmonton East
- In office May 22, 1979 – September 3, 1984
- Preceded by: William Skoreyko
- Succeeded by: William Lesick

Member of the Legislative Assembly of Alberta for Edmonton-Gold Bar Strathcona East (1969–1971)
- In office February 10, 1969 – January 1, 1979
- Preceded by: Ernest Manning
- Succeeded by: Al Hiebert

Personal details
- Born: William John Yurko; February 11, 1926 Hairy Hill, Alberta, Canada
- Died: February 2, 2010 (aged 83) Edmonton, Alberta, Canada
- Party: Progressive Conservative
- Other political affiliations: Independent (1982-1984)
- Spouse: Mary Paul (m. 1947; died 2009)
- Education: University of Alberta
- Occupation: Chemical engineer

William "Vasile" Yurko (February 11, 1926 – February 2, 2010) was a Canadian politician, and member of the Legislative Assembly of Alberta and the House of Commons of Canada.

Yurko was born in 1926 in Hairy Hill, Alberta of Romanian and Ukrainian descent. He served two years in the Royal Canadian Air Force during World War II, then graduated with distinction as a chemical engineer from the University of Alberta. He worked for 17 years (six of them within the Atomic Energy of Canada) before 1969, when he entered politics.

He was elected Member of the Legislative Assembly (MLA) as a candidate of the Progressive Conservative Association of Alberta in the Strathcona East riding by-election on February 10, 1969, following the resignation of Premier Ernest Manning.

He was elected to the Legislative Assembly for the Edmonton Gold Bar riding in 1971 and re-elected in 1975.

In 1979 he was elected to the House of Commons for the Edmonton East riding as a candidate of the Progressive Conservative Party of Canada, and he held the seat until 1984, when he ran as an independent for the same riding, but lost to William Lesick.

- In 1971, he held the portfolio of Environment Minister in the Alberta Cabinet.
- In 1977, he held the portfolio of Housing and Public Works Minister.
- 1979–1984, he was a Member of Parliament in the 31st and 32nd Canadian Parliaments.
- On September 23, 1983, he tabled Bill C-691 (and on March 14, 1984, tried again with Bill C-228) to pardon Louis Riel. The act was not passed until 1992.
- After 1985 he was a Member of the Senate and Board of Governors of the University of Alberta.
