= William Lesick =

Canadian politician

Member of Parliament for Edmonton East
- In office 1984–1988
- Preceded by: William Yurko
- Succeeded by: Ross Harvey

Personal details
- Born: 10 June 1923 Spedden, Alberta, Canada
- Died: 9 September 2011 (aged 88) Edmonton, Alberta, Canada
- Party: Progressive Conservative
- Profession: Pharmacist

William Lesick (10 June 1923 – 9 September 2011) was a Progressive Conservative party member of the House of Commons of Canada. He was a pharmacist by career.

Lesick was born in Spedden, Alberta. He was elected at the Edmonton East electoral district in the 1984 federal election, thus he served in the 33rd Canadian Parliament. Lesick was defeated at the same riding in the 1988 federal election by Ross Harvey of the New Democratic Party.

He died in 2011 aged 88.
