= Edmonton East =

Former federal electoral district in Alberta, Canada

Coordinates: 53.57°N 113.45°W

Alberta electoral district
- Edmonton East in relation to other federal electoral districts in Edmonton

Defunct federal electoral district
- Legislature: House of Commons
- District created: 1914
- District abolished: 2013
- First contested: 1917
- Last contested: 2011
- District webpage: profile, map

Demographics
- Population (2011): 135,254
- Electors (2011): 92,495
- Area (km²): 48.98
- Census division: Division No. 11
- Census subdivision: Edmonton

Edmonton East (formerly known as Edmonton Centre-East) was a federal electoral district in Alberta, Canada, that was represented in the House of Commons of Canada from 1917 to 2015.

The district included a portion of the city of Edmonton.

== Geography ==
The district at first was a far-flung mixed urban and rural riding that extended from the North Saskatchewan River into the Northland northeast of Edmonton. It covered the area stretching north and east of the connection of 101st Street and the North Saskatchewan River, in the middle of present-day Edmonton, all the way to the north boundary of Alberta.

In 1924 it was compressed to nearby farmland north of Edmonton (an area that is within the present limits of Edmonton), plus on the north side of the river the whole of Edmonton lying east of 101st Street, and on the south side of the river the area lying within Edmonton and east of the C&E line.

Later, it became an urban riding within the City of Edmonton.

In 1966, it was in the area lying north of 98th Avenue and east of 101st Street.

In 1976, it was entirely on the north side and between Groat Road/109th Street and 97th Street.

== History ==
This riding was originally created in 1914 as "Edmonton East" from Edmonton and Victoria ridings. At the time of its creation, this district included a massive, sparsely populated rural area. Most of this area was removed due to the creation of Athabaska in 1924, and although it gained some back when Pembina riding was abolished in 1987, it became a fully urban riding by the end of its existence.

In 1924, it took in parts of the now-abolished Strathcona riding that had been within Edmonton city limits.

As Edmonton's population has grown, Edmonton East also lost urban territory to new ridings. Edmonton East lost territory due to the creation of Edmonton—Strathcona (in 1952), Edmonton Centre (1966), Edmonton North (1976), and Edmonton Northwest (1987). It gained area due to the (temporary) abolition of Edmonton Centre in 1976.

In 2000, it was renamed "Edmonton Centre-East". In 2003 Edmonton Centre-East was abolished and its territory reassigned to a re-created Edmonton Centre, a new Edmonton East riding, and Edmonton—Sherwood Park.

The new "Edmonton East" riding was created from parts of Edmonton Centre-East and the dissolved riding of Edmonton North.

=== Historical boundaries ===
1924 representation order

1933 representation order

1952 representation order

1966 representation order

1976 representation order

1987 representation order

1996 representation order

2003 representation order

== Members of Parliament ==
This riding elected the following members of the House of Commons of Canada:

Parliament	Years	Member	Party
Edmonton East; Riding created from Edmonton and Victoria
13th	1917–1921	Henry Arthur Mackie	Government (Unionist)
14th	1921–1925	Donald Ferdinand Kellner	United Farmers of Alberta
15th	1925–1926	Ambrose Bury	Progressive Conservative
16th	1926–1930	Kenny Blatchford	Social Credit
17th	1930–1935	Ambrose Bury	Progressive Conservative
18th	1935–1938	William Samuel Hall	Social Credit
18th	1938–1940	Orvis A. Kennedy	Social Credit
19th	1940–1941	Frederick Clayton Casselman	Liberal
19th	1941–1945	Cora Taylor Casselman	Liberal
20th	1945–1949	Patrick Harvey Ashby	Social Credit
21st	1949–1953	Albert Frederick Macdonald	Liberal
22nd	1953–1957	Ambrose Holowach	Social Credit
23rd	1957–1958	Ambrose Holowach	Social Credit
24th	1958–1962	William Skoreyko	Progressive Conservative
25th	1962–1963	William Skoreyko	Progressive Conservative
26th	1963–1965	William Skoreyko	Progressive Conservative
27th	1965–1968	William Skoreyko	Progressive Conservative
28th	1968–1972	William Skoreyko	Progressive Conservative
29th	1972–1974	William Skoreyko	Progressive Conservative
30th	1974–1979	William Skoreyko	Progressive Conservative
31st	1979–1980	William Yurko	Progressive Conservative
32nd	1980–1984	William Yurko	Progressive Conservative
33rd	1984–1988	William Lesick	Progressive Conservative
34th	1988–1993	Ross Harvey	New Democratic
35th	1993–1997	Judy Bethel	Liberal
36th	1997–2000	Peter Goldring	Reform
36th	2000–2000	Peter Goldring	Alliance
Riding renamed — Edmonton Centre-East
37th	2000–2003	Peter Goldring	Alliance
37th	2003–2004	Peter Goldring	Conservative
Riding renamed — Edmonton East
38th	2004–2006	Peter Goldring	Conservative
39th	2006–2008	Peter Goldring	Conservative
40th	2008–2011	Peter Goldring	Conservative
41st	2011–2011	Peter Goldring	Conservative
41st	2011–2013	Peter Goldring	Independent
41st	2013–2015	Peter Goldring	Conservative
Riding dissolved into Edmonton Griesbach, Edmonton Manning and Edmonton Strathcona

== Election results ==
=== Edmonton East, 2004–2015 ===
2011 Canadian federal election
Party	Candidate	Votes	%	±%	Expenditures
Conservative	Peter Goldring	24,111	52.75	+1.43	$66,811.75
New Democratic	Ray Martin	17,078	37.36	+5.55	$54,991.84
Liberal	Shafik Ruda	3,176	6.95	–3.98	$24,293.22
Green	Trey Capnerhurst	1,345	2.94	–3.00	$1,588.60
Total valid votes/expense limit		45,710	99.58	–	$95,270.81
Total rejected ballots		194	0.42	+0.06	
Turnout		45,904	49.62	+4.19	
Eligible voters		92,507			
Conservative hold		Swing		+3.49	
Source: Elections Canada

2008 Canadian federal election
Party	Candidate	Votes	%	±%	Expenditures
Conservative	Peter Goldring	21,487	51.32	+1.19	$66,014.30
New Democratic	Ray Martin	13,318	31.81	+13.34	$25,967.96
Liberal	Stephanie Laskoski	4,578	10.93	–15.23	$11,797.51
Green	Trey Capnerhurst	2,488	5.94	+0.70	$750.00
Total valid votes/expense limit		41,871	99.64	–	$92,946.15
Total rejected ballots		151	0.36	–0.01	
Turnout		42,022	45.43	–9.85	
Eligible voters		92,495			
Conservative hold		Swing		+7.27	
Source: Elections Canada

2006 Canadian federal election
Party	Candidate	Votes	%	±%	Expenditures
Conservative	Peter Goldring	25,086	50.13	+4.11	$55,435.09
Liberal	Nicole Martel	13,088	26.16	–6.27	$75,713.28
New Democratic	Arlene Chapman	9,243	18.47	+3.76	$21,495.30
Green	Trey Capnerhurst	2,623	5.24	–0.38	$45.50
Total valid votes/expense limit		50,040	99.63	–	$86,902.82
Total rejected ballots		186	0.37	–0.09	
Turnout		50,226	55.28	+3.70	
Eligible voters		90,861			
Conservative hold		Swing		+5.19	
Source: Elections Canada

2004 Canadian federal election
Party	Candidate	Votes	%	±%	Expenditures
Conservative	Peter Goldring	20,224	46.02	–1.78	$56,366.23
Liberal	John Bethel	14,250	32.43	–1.77	$60,762.55
New Democratic	Janina Strudwick	6,464	14.71	–	$11,840.72
Green	Harlan Light	2,471	5.62	–2.73	none listed
Christian Heritage	Ed Spronk	538	1.22	–	$14,998.24
Total valid votes/expense limit		43,947	99.54	–	$81,518.75
Total rejected ballots		203	0.46	+0.09	
Turnout		44,150	51.58	–1.84	
Eligible voters		85,602			
Conservative notional hold		Swing		–1.78	
Source: Elections Canada

=== Edmonton Centre-East, 2000 ===
2000 Canadian federal election: Edmonton Centre-East
Party	Candidate	Votes	%	±%	Expenditures
Alliance	Peter Goldring	17,768	42.44	–2.14	$58,345
Liberal	Sue Olsen	14,323	34.21	–0.38	$57,858
New Democratic	Ray Martin	7,304	17.44	+5.64	$56,287
Progressive Conservative	Kevin Mahfouz	2,252	5.38	–1.92	$1,688
Communist	Naomi Rankin	222	0.53	–	$238
Total valid votes		41,869	99.63		
Total rejected ballots		156	0.37	+0.15	
Turnout		42,025	53.42	+1.73	
Eligible voters		78,673			
Alliance hold		Swing		–1.26	
Source: Elections Canada

=== Edmonton East, 1997 ===
1997 Canadian federal election
Party	Candidate	Votes	%	±%	Expenditures
Reform	Peter Goldring	15,475	44.58	+11.94	$53,263
Liberal	Judy Bethel	12,005	34.58	+1.62	$32,152
New Democratic	Hana Razga	4,096	11.80	–10.25	$14,574
Progressive Conservative	Carla Barkley	2,535	7.30	–0.09	$8,948
Christian Heritage	John B. Ludwig	287	0.83	+0.19	$5,063
Green	Ed Schell	211	0.61	+0.14	none listed
Natural Law	Geoff Toane	107	0.31	–0.28	none listed
Total valid votes		34,716	99.78		
Total rejected ballots		77	0.22	–0.31	
Turnout		34,793	51.69	–2.29	
Eligible voters		67,313			
Reform gain from Liberal		Swing		+6.78	
Source: Elections Canada

1993 Canadian federal election
Party	Candidate	Votes	%	±%
Liberal	Judy Bethel	11,922	32.96	+14.77
Reform	Linda Robertson	11,807	32.64	+28.25
New Democratic	Ross Harvey	7,976	22.05	–16.15
Progressive Conservative	Kevin Kovacs	2,672	7.39	–29.14
National	Jim Musson	1,049	2.90	–
Christian Heritage	Cor Labots	231	0.64	–1.39
Natural Law	Paula Johnsen	212	0.59	–
Green	Ernst Eder	171	0.47	–
Canada Party	Peter Kiriaka	80	0.22	–
Independent	James Jacques	51	0.14	–
Total valid votes		36,171	99.47	
Total rejected ballots		193	0.53	+0.14
Turnout		36,364	53.98	–14.75
Eligible voters		67,361		
Liberal gain from New Democratic		Swing		+21.51
Source: Elections Canada

1988 Canadian federal election
Party	Candidate	Votes	%	±%
New Democratic	Ross Harvey	15,051	38.20	+15.14
Progressive Conservative	William Lesick	14,394	36.53	–11.95
Liberal	Peggy Blair	7,167	18.19	+0.14
Reform	Elaine Sim	1,728	4.39	–
Christian Heritage	Ron Romanow	798	2.03	–
Communist	Naomi Rankin	123	0.31	–0.07
Independent	Bernie Sawatzky	88	0.22	–8.37
Confederation of Regions	Robert J. Yanew	53	0.13	–0.59
Total valid votes		39,402	99.61	
Total rejected ballots		156	0.39	–0.06
Turnout		39,558	68.73	+7.09
Eligible voters		57,553		
New Democratic gain from Progressive Conservative		Swing		+13.55
Source: Elections Canada

1984 Canadian federal election
Party	Candidate	Votes	%	±%
Progressive Conservative	William Lesick	16,119	48.48	–5.41
New Democratic	Muriel Stanley Venne	7,668	23.06	+5.76
Liberal	Al Iafolla	6,002	18.05	–9.57
Independent	William Yurko	2,857	8.59	–
Confederation of Regions	Clifford Major	241	0.72	–
Green	Reg Silvester	233	0.70	–
Communist	David Wallis	128	0.38	+0.07
Total valid votes		33,248	99.55	
Total rejected ballots		149	0.45	–0.03
Turnout		33,397	61.64	+14.47
Eligible voters		54,178		
Progressive Conservative hold		Swing		–5.59
Source: Elections Canada

1980 Canadian federal election
Party	Candidate	Votes	%	±%
Progressive Conservative	William Yurko	14,840	53.89	–2.17
Liberal	Gerry Lorente	7,606	27.62	–0.12
New Democratic	Jo Evans	4,763	17.30	+1.85
Social Credit	John Tymchyshyn	187	0.68	–
Communist	Kimball Cariou	84	0.31	–0.19
Marxist–Leninist	Peggy Morton	57	0.21	–0.04
Total valid votes		27,537	99.52	
Total rejected ballots		133	0.48	+0.08
Turnout		27,670	47.17	–12.37
Eligible voters		58,665		
Progressive Conservative hold		Swing		+1.15
Source: Elections Canada

1979 Canadian federal election
Party	Candidate	Votes	%	±%
Progressive Conservative	William Yurko	18,699	56.06	+4.20
Liberal	Jerry Paschen	9,253	27.74	–3.74
New Democratic	Lynn Fogwill	5,154	15.45	+2.96
Communist	Kimball Cariou	168	0.50	+0.00
Marxist–Leninist	Peggy Morton	84	0.25	+0.11
Total valid votes		33,358	99.60	
Total rejected ballots		134	0.40	+0.07
Turnout		33,492	59.54	–2.17
Eligible voters		56,254		
Progressive Conservative hold		Swing		+3.97
Source: Elections Canada

1974 Canadian federal election
Party	Candidate	Votes	%	±%
Progressive Conservative	William Skoreyko	18,321	51.86	+0.28
Liberal	Una MacLean-Evans	11,122	31.48	+2.21
New Democratic	Bill Kobluk	4,413	12.49	–3.35
Social Credit	Martin Hattersley	1,119	3.17	+0.39
Communist	William Arnold Tuomi	176	0.50	–
Independent	Dick Nimmons	128	0.36	–
Marxist–Leninist	Peggy Morton	49	0.14	–
Total valid votes		35,328	99.67	
Total rejected ballots		116	0.33	–0.59
Turnout		35,444	61.71	–9.61
Eligible voters		57,434		
Progressive Conservative hold		Swing		+1.25
Source: Library of Parliament

1972 Canadian federal election
Party	Candidate	Votes	%	±%
Progressive Conservative	William Skoreyko	21,137	51.58	+5.49
Liberal	Una MacLean-Evans	11,997	29.27	–7.97
New Democratic	Ashley Pachal	6,493	15.84	+0.37
Social Credit	Nick D. Senyk	1,139	2.78	–
Independent	William Arnold Tuomi	217	0.53	–
Total valid votes		40,983	99.08	
Total rejected ballots		382	0.92	+0.00
Turnout		41,365	71.32	+3.21
Eligible voters		57,997		
Progressive Conservative hold		Swing		+6.73
Source: Library of Parliament

1968 Canadian federal election
Party	Candidate	Votes	%	±%
Progressive Conservative	William Skoreyko	15,764	46.09	+1.04
Liberal	Pat Shewchuk	12,739	37.24	+16.61
New Democratic	Roy H. Jamha	5,292	15.47	+4.80
Communist	William R. Askin	410	1.20	–0.08
Total valid votes		34,205	99.08	
Total rejected ballots		316	0.92	–0.15
Turnout		34,521	68.11	+1.22
Eligible voters		50,681		
Progressive Conservative hold		Swing		+8.83
Source: Library of Parliament

1965 Canadian federal election
Party	Candidate	Votes	%	±%
Progressive Conservative	William Skoreyko	13,596	45.05	+3.35
Social Credit	Preston Manning	6,752	22.37	+0.71
Liberal	Nick Mosychuk	6,228	20.63	–3.78
New Democratic	Robert William Douglas	3,222	10.67	–0.52
Communist	William Arnold Tuomi	385	1.28	+0.24
Total valid votes		30,183	98.93	
Total rejected ballots		326	1.07	+0.43
Turnout		30,509	66.89	–6.88
Eligible voters		45,609		
Progressive Conservative hold		Swing		+2.03
Source: Library of Parliament

1963 Canadian federal election
Party	Candidate	Votes	%	±%
Progressive Conservative	William Skoreyko	13,582	41.70	+8.21
Liberal	Donald Brinton	7,950	24.41	+0.00
Social Credit	Lucien Maynard	7,057	21.66	–5.94
New Democratic	Ivor Dent	3,645	11.19	–3.31
Communist	William Arnold Tuomi	340	1.04	–
Total valid votes		32,574	99.36	
Total rejected ballots		210	0.64	–0.33
Turnout		32,784	73.77	+8.03
Eligible voters		44,443		
Progressive Conservative hold		Swing		+4.11
Source: Library of Parliament

1962 Canadian federal election
Party	Candidate	Votes	%	±%
Progressive Conservative	William Skoreyko	9,291	33.49	–20.85
Social Credit	Lucien Maynard	7,657	27.60	+4.63
Liberal	John Decore	6,771	24.41	+8.67
New Democratic	Douglas Tomlinson	4,023	14.50	+10.15
Total valid votes		27,742	99.03	
Total rejected ballots		271	0.97	–0.03
Turnout		28,013	65.74	–4.49
Eligible voters		42,615		
Progressive Conservative hold		Swing		–12.74
Source: Library of Parliament

1958 Canadian federal election
Party	Candidate	Votes	%	±%
Progressive Conservative	William Skoreyko	15,236	54.34	+39.99
Social Credit	Ambrose Holowach	6,441	22.97	–17.09
Liberal	John David Bracco	4,413	15.74	–23.29
Co-operative Commonwealth	Peter Uganecz	1,220	4.35	–2.21
Labor–Progressive	William Arnold Tuomi	473	1.69	–
Independent Progressive Conservative	Aubrey Allen Smith	253	0.90	–
Total valid votes		28,036	99.00	
Total rejected ballots		283	1.00	–0.16
Turnout		28,319	70.23	–0.28
Eligible voters		40,322		
Progressive Conservative gain from Social Credit		Swing		+28.54
Source: Library of Parliament

1957 Canadian federal election
Party	Candidate	Votes	%	±%
Social Credit	Ambrose Holowach	10,967	40.06	–0.42
Liberal	William Hawrelak	10,683	39.03	+4.20
Progressive Conservative	John Bowie-Reed	3,927	14.35	+2.16
Co-operative Commonwealth	Robert Atkin	1,797	6.56	–1.74
Total valid votes		27,374	98.84	
Total rejected ballots		322	1.16	–0.42
Turnout		27,696	70.51	+14.24
Eligible voters		39,278		
Social Credit hold		Swing		–2.31
Source: Library of Parliament

1953 Canadian federal election
Party	Candidate	Votes	%	±%
Social Credit	Ambrose Holowach	8,802	40.48	+14.21
Liberal	Albert Frederick Macdonald	7,574	34.83	–1.30
Progressive Conservative	Albert John Hidson	2,651	12.19	–0.39
Co-operative Commonwealth	Robert Atkin	1,805	8.30	–1.46
Labor–Progressive	William Arnold Tuomi	637	2.93	–1.13
Independent	Maurice Dudley McArthur	275	1.26	–
Total valid votes		21,744	98.42	
Total rejected ballots		350	1.58	+0.20
Turnout		22,094	56.27	–8.55
Eligible voters		39,263		
Social Credit gain from Liberal		Swing		+7.76
Source: Library of Parliament

1949 Canadian federal election
Party	Candidate	Votes	%	±%
Liberal	Albert Frederick Macdonald	10,964	36.13	+14.62
Social Credit	Ambrose Holowach	7,972	26.27	–6.99
Progressive Conservative	John Hector Thorogood	3,816	12.58	–4.08
Independent Social Credit	Patrick Harvey Ashby	3,400	11.20	–
Co-operative Commonwealth	Hugh John McKim Ross	2,961	9.76	–13.86
Labor–Progressive	Bernard Rudolf Swankey	1,232	4.06	–0.89
Total valid votes		30,345	98.62	
Total rejected ballots		425	1.38	–1.14
Turnout		30,770	64.82	–1.60
Eligible voters		47,473		
Liberal gain from Social Credit		Swing		+10.81
Source: Library of Parliament

1945 Canadian federal election
Party	Candidate	Votes	%	±%
Social Credit	Patrick Harvey Ashby	8,214	33.26	+3.50
Co-operative Commonwealth	Harry Ainlay	5,833	23.62	–
Liberal	Cora Taylor Casselman	5,313	21.51	–30.27
Progressive Conservative	Henry B. Jamieson	4,115	16.66	–
Labor–Progressive	Jan Lakeman	1,223	4.95	–
Total valid votes		24,698	97.48	
Total rejected ballots		639	2.52	+2.52
Turnout		25,337	66.42	–
Eligible voters		38,145		
Social Credit gain from Liberal		Swing		+13.56
Source: Library of Parliament

Canadian federal by-election, June 2, 1941 Death of Frederick Clayton Casselman on March 20, 1941
Party	Candidate	Votes	%	±%
Liberal	Cora Taylor Casselman	7,306	51.78	+8.11
Social Credit	Orvis A. Kennedy	4,199	29.76	–5.76
Communist	A. A. MacLeod	2,605	18.46	–
Total valid votes		14,110	100.00	
Total rejected ballots		unknown		
Turnout		14,110	–	–
Eligible voters				
Liberal hold		Swing		+18.94
Source: Library of Parliament

1940 Canadian federal election
Party	Candidate	Votes	%	±%
Liberal	Frederick Clayton Casselman	8,948	43.67	+4.64
New Democracy	Orvis A. Kennedy	7,279	35.52	–
National Government	Sidney J. Gee	2,302	11.23	–
Co-operative Commonwealth	Clifford E. Lee	1,962	9.57	–
Total valid votes		20,491	98.95	
Total rejected ballots		218	1.05	+1.05
Turnout		20,709	67.20	–
Eligible voters		30,816		
Liberal gain from Social Credit		Swing		+20.08
Source: Library of Parliament

Canadian federal by-election, March 21, 1938 Death of William Samuel Hall on January 26, 1983
Party	Candidate	Votes	%	±%
Social Credit	Orvis A. Kennedy	9,904	48.81	+11.19
Liberal	Robert Colin Marshall	7,920	39.03	+8.87
Unknown	Walter W. Cleveley	2,466	12.15	–
Total valid votes		20,290	100.00	
Total rejected ballots		unknown		
Turnout		20,290	–	–
Eligible voters				
Social Credit hold		Swing		+10.03
Source: Library of Parliament

1935 Canadian federal election
Party	Candidate	Votes	%	±%
Social Credit	William Samuel Hall	5,721	35.29	–
Liberal	George Brown McLeod	4,889	30.16	–2.96
Conservative	Peter Edwin Bowen	2,827	17.44	–27.39
Co-operative Commonwealth	Elmer Roper	1,726	10.65	–
Communist	Oliver C. Doolan	671	4.14	–
Social Credit	Raymond Charles Ghostley	378	2.33	–
Total valid votes		16,212	98.56	
Total rejected ballots		237	1.44	+1.44
Turnout		16,449	65.91	–0.23
Eligible voters		24,956		
Social Credit gain from Conservative		Swing		+19.13
Source: Library of Parliament

1930 Canadian federal election
Party	Candidate	Votes	%	±%
Conservative	Ambrose Bury	6,662	44.83	+1.84
Liberal	Kenny Blatchford	4,921	33.12	–11.31
Farmer–Labour	George Latham	2,767	18.62	+6.04
Farmer–Labour	Jan Lakeman	509	3.43	–9.15
Total valid votes		14,859	100.00	
Total rejected ballots		unknown		
Turnout		14,859	66.14	+7.54
Eligible voters		22,466		
Conservative gain from Liberal		Swing		+6.58
Source: Library of Parliament

1926 Canadian federal election
Party	Candidate	Votes	%	±%
Liberal	Kenny Blatchford	5,090	44.43	+10.48
Conservative	Ambrose Bury	4,925	42.99	+4.24
Farmer–Labour	Jan Lakeman	1,441	12.58	–14.72
Total valid votes		11,456	100.00	
Total rejected ballots		unknown		
Turnout		11,456	58.60	+7.82
Eligible voters		19,548		
Liberal gain from Conservative		Swing		+7.36
Source: Library of Parliament

1925 Canadian federal election
Party	Candidate	Votes	%	±%
Conservative	Ambrose Bury	3,927	38.75	+15.29
Liberal	Andrew Robert McLennan	3,440	33.95	+2.96
Farmer–Labour	George Latham	2,767	27.30	–
Total valid votes		10,134	100.00	
Total rejected ballots		unknown		
Turnout		10,134	50.78	+2.57
Eligible voters		19,958		
Conservative gain from Progressive		Swing		+9.13
Source: Library of Parliament

1921 Canadian federal election
Party	Candidate	Votes	%	±%
Progressive	Donald Ferdinand Kellner	6,094	45.55	–
Liberal	Joseph Clarke	4,147	30.99	–6.83
Conservative	Henry Arthur Mackie	3,139	23.46	–38.71
Total valid votes		13,380	100.00	
Total rejected ballots		unknown		
Turnout		13,380	48.21	–45.64
Eligible voters		27,755		
Progressive gain from Government (Unionist)		Swing		N/A
Source: Library of Parliament

1917 Canadian federal election
Party	Candidate	Votes	%	±%
Government (Unionist)	Henry Arthur Mackie	6,775	62.17	–
Opposition (Laurier Liberals)	Alexander Esson May	4,122	37.83	–
Total valid votes		10,897	100.00	
Total rejected ballots		unknown		
Turnout		10,897	93.85	
Eligible voters		11,611		
Source: Library of Parliament

== See also ==
- Edmonton East (provincial electoral district)
- List of Canadian electoral districts
- Historical federal electoral districts of Canada
