= Ross Harvey =

Canadian politician (born 1952)

Leader of the Alberta New Democratic Party
- In office February 5, 1994 – September 1996
- Preceded by: Ray Martin
- Succeeded by: Pam Barrett

Member of Parliament for Edmonton East
- In office November 21, 1988 – October 25, 1993
- Preceded by: William Lesick
- Succeeded by: Judy Bethel

Personal details
- Born: 25 April 1952 (age 74) Vancouver, British Columbia, Canada
- Party: New Democratic
- Profession: Politician

Ross Harvey (born 25 April 1952) is a Canadian politician who was a member of the House of Commons of Canada from 1988 to 1993. He sat as an NDP MP from 1988 to 1993, representing Edmonton East.

== Biography ==
Harvey's background is in information and research.

Prior to entering into a career in politics, he was a member of Spiny Norman's Whoopee Band in Edmonton, Alberta while a university student. Bandmate and local celebrity Holger Petersen called the band a "Monty Python/Frank Zappa kind of thing."

Ross worked as executive assistant to Alberta NDP leaders Grant Notley and Ray Martin between 1979 and 1986, and as caucus coordinator and research director for the 16-member NDP Official Opposition caucus elected to the Alberta Legislature in 1986.

He was elected in the 1988 federal election at the Edmonton East electoral district for the New Democratic Party. This was the first time an NDP MP was elected in Alberta. He served in the 34th Canadian Parliament but lost to Judy Bethel of the Liberal Party in the 1993 federal election. Among the issues he championed in the House of Commons were renewable energy and justice for the Lubicon Lake Cree nation. Until Linda Duncan's victory in the 2008 federal election, Harvey was the only Alberta member of the NDP or the CCF, its predecessor party, elected to the House of Commons.

After his 1993 defeat, he was elected leader of the Alberta New Democrats in February 1994, he survived a leadership challenge in November 1995 (by Anne McGrath) but resigned his position in September 1996 without having faced a general election as leader.

He and his family (common-law spouse Deb Bowers and son Isaac Harvey) moved to British Columbia that month, first spending nine months in Castlegar, then moving permanently to Vancouver. They re-located to Mission, east of Vancouver, in 2007.

He worked from July 1997 to August 2018 as executive director of the BC Persons With AIDS Society (renamed the Positive Living Society of British Columbia in March 2011). When he retired from this position, he and Deb moved back to Castlegar. In 2026, one and one-half years after Deb's death in 2024, he and Isaac bought a condo together in New Westminster where he now lives.

According to his entry for Who's Who 2008, he is a self-described socialist whose religion is physics.
