= Peter Goldring =

Canadian politician

Member of Parliament for Edmonton East
- In office 2 June 1997 – 19 October 2015
- Preceded by: Judy Bethel
- Succeeded by: Riding Abolished

Personal details
- Born: 12 December 1944 (age 81) Toronto, Ontario
- Party: Reform (1997–2000); Canadian Alliance (2000–2003); Conservative (2003–2011, 2013–present); Independent (2011–2013)
- Spouse: Lorraine Goldring
- Profession: Business Manager

Peter Goldring (born 12 December 1944) is a former Canadian federal politician.

== Early life and career ==
Goldring was born in Toronto in 1944. He served in the Royal Canadian Air Force, from 1962 to 1965, as a military police officer.

After living in Ontario and Quebec he settled in Edmonton, in 1972.

== Federal politics ==
Goldring was a Conservative Member of Parliament in the House of Commons of Canada, representing the riding of Edmonton East from 2004 to 2015, Edmonton Centre-East from 2000 to 2004, and Edmonton East from 1997 to 2000. He was also a member of the Reform Party of Canada, (1997–2000) and the Canadian Alliance (2000–2003). From 2003 until 2011, he was a member of the Conservative Party of Canada; he resigned from the Conservative caucus in December 2011 after he was charged with refusing to provide a breath sample using a roadside screening device. He has sat as an independent Member of Parliament before being welcomed back to the Conservative caucus in 2013. Goldring did not run for re-election in 2015 following a string of incidents, including a controversial press release in the wake of the November 2014 harassment accusations against fellow Liberal Members of Parliament, Scott Andrews and Massimo Pacetti, by unnamed New Democratic Party colleagues.

Goldring is a former businessman and manager. Goldring is the former official opposition critic of Veterans Affairs, Public Works and Government Services, and Public Housing.

In 2004, Goldring visited the Turks and Caicos Islands in the Caribbean to explore the possibility of amalgamating the islands into a Canadian territory. In September of that year, Goldring was appointed as Foreign Affairs Critic for the Caribbean. A week after the passage of Hurricane Ivan over Grenada, Goldring visited the island as well as Barbados, St. Lucia, and Dominica, touring much of the destruction. Upon returning to Canada, Goldring pressed the government for much needed assistance.

As reported by the Globe and Mail on 19 February 2010, Goldring sent out a pamphlet to his constituents describing Louis Riel as a villain with blood on his hands who stood in the way of Confederation. He also resisted calls to overturn Riel's conviction for treason and for him to be named a Father of Confederation. According to Métis historians and scholars George and Terry Goulet Goldring's pamphlet was "riddled with numerous egregious errors and many omissions".

When the York University-based Canadian Homelessness Research Network (CHRN) released the first Canadian Definition of Homelessness in 2012, Goldring, a member of the Edmonton Committee to End Homelessness, argued that the CHRN's definition painted an overly broad picture including those who were "having a hard time financially." Goldring felt that, "You don’t want to look at it coldly, but they’re really not in desperate need until they’re holding that eviction notice in their hand." For this, he was heavily criticized for maintaining a lack of knowledge on the subject as well as advocating a lack of inclusivity.

Following the adoption of a 10-year plan to end homelessness, based on public-private partnerships and inter-municipal collaboration, Edmonton's homeless population dropped to 2,421 people in 2009, from 3,079 people in 2008. Goldring supports such a system, in which private sector affordable housing, such as Boardwalk Rental Communities and ProCura's Mayfair Village project, to provide affordable housing. His personal stance is firmly against public social housing solutions.

== Personal life ==
Goldring is married to Lorraine and has two daughters.

== Controversy ==
After a party on the evening of Saturday, 3 December 2011, Peter Goldring was stopped by the Edmonton Police Service, during a routine roadside spot-check to curb impaired driving.

Goldring, who has publicly opposed the use of breathalyzers to catch impaired drivers, refused to provide a breath sample. Shortly after the incident, Goldring resigned from the caucus of the Conservative Party of Canada. Following the incident, he sat as an independent member of the House of Commons, and asked to be recognized as an Independent Conservative. Later, upon being found not guilty for refusing to provide a breath sample, the presiding judge determined the politician was cautious about the request but did not purposefully delay or refuse. Goldring soon after rejoined Conservative caucus.
