= Edmonton South =

Former federal electoral district in Alberta, Canada

Alberta electoral district

Defunct federal electoral district
- Legislature: House of Commons
- District created: 1976
- District abolished: 1987
- First contested: 1979
- Last contested: 1984

Edmonton South was a federal electoral district in Alberta, Canada, that was represented in the House of Commons of Canada from 1979 to 1988. This riding was created in 1976 from parts of Edmonton West and Pembina ridings.

It was abolished in 1987 when it was redistributed into Edmonton Southwest and Edmonton—Strathcona ridings.

In April 2025, the son of 1980 Liberal candidate, Bob (Professor Robert) Carney (1933–2009), Mark Carney was elected Prime Minister of Canada.

== Members of Parliament ==
Edmonton South
| Parliament | Years | Member | Party |
|---|---|---|---|
District created from Edmonton West and Pembina
| 31st | 1979–1980 | Douglas Roche | Progressive Conservative |
| 32nd | 1980–1984 | Douglas Roche | Progressive Conservative |
| 33rd | 1984–1988 | Jim Edwards | Progressive Conservative |
District redistributed into Edmonton Southwest and Edmonton—Strathcona

== Election results ==
1984 Canadian federal election
| Party | Candidate | Votes | % | ±% |
|---|---|---|---|---|
| Progressive Conservative | Jim Edwards | 32,510 | 62.46 | +1.39 |
| New Democratic | Joanna L.H. Miazga | 9,407 | 18.07 | +6.34 |
| Liberal | Ken Munro | 8,259 | 15.87 | –10.37 |
| Confederation of Regions | Erika Guidera | 579 | 1.11 | – |
| Rhinoceros | David W. Huber | 536 | 1.03 | – |
| Green | Harry Garfinkle | 503 | 0.97 | – |
| Social Credit | Reinhard G. Mueller | 252 | 0.48 | – |
| Total valid votes | | 52,046 | 99.83 | |
| Total rejected ballots | | 87 | 0.17 | +0.03 |
| Turnout | | 52,133 | 74.07 | +14.58 |
| Eligible voters | | 70,385 | | |
| Progressive Conservative hold | | Swing | | +3.87 |
Source: Elections Canada

1980 Canadian federal election
| Party | Candidate | Votes | % | ±% |
|---|---|---|---|---|
| Progressive Conservative | Douglas Roche | 24,839 | 61.07 | +1.26 |
| Liberal | Robert J. Carney | 10,673 | 26.24 | –2.29 |
| New Democratic | Gordon F.N. Fearn | 4,772 | 11.73 | +0.07 |
| Independent | Robert T. Cristall | 318 | 0.78 | – |
| Marxist–Leninist | Mary Joyce | 70 | 0.17 | – |
| Total valid votes | | 40,672 | 99.86 | |
| Total rejected ballots | | 57 | 0.14 | –0.05 |
| Turnout | | 40,729 | 59.49 | –13.19 |
| Eligible voters | | 68,459 | | |
| Progressive Conservative hold | | Swing | | +1.78 |
Source: Elections Canada

1979 Canadian federal election
| Party | Candidate | Votes | % | ±% |
|---|---|---|---|---|
| Progressive Conservative | Douglas Roche | 27,713 | 59.81 | – |
| Liberal | Alex Fallow | 13,221 | 28.53 | – |
| New Democratic | Gordon F.N. Fearn | 5,401 | 11.66 | – |
| Total valid votes | | 46,335 | 99.81 | |
| Total rejected ballots | | 90 | 0.19 | – |
| Turnout | | 46,425 | 72.68 | – |
| Eligible voters | | 63,877 | | |
| Progressive Conservative notional gain | | Swing | | N/A |
Source: Elections Canada

== See also ==
- Edmonton South (provincial electoral district)
- List of Canadian electoral districts
- Historical federal electoral districts of Canada
