= Robert J. Carney =

Father of Mark Carney

- Carney in 1963
- Born: Robert James Carney; 3 November 1933
- Died: 9 December 2009 (aged 76); Nanaimo, British Columbia, Canada
- Education: University of British Columbia (BA, MEd); University of Alberta (EdD)
- Occupation: Professor
- Employer: University of Alberta
- Political party: Liberal
- Spouse: Verlie Margaret Kemper (m. 1957)
- Children: 4, including Mark

Robert James Carney (3 November 1933 – 9 December 2009) was a Canadian educator and the father of Mark Carney, the 24th prime minister of Canada. He retired from the University of Alberta as professor emeritus. Carney was a candidate in the 1980 Canadian federal election, running as a Liberal in the riding of Edmonton South.

== Early life and education ==
Robert J. Carney was born on 3 November 1933. He worked as a waiter on Canadian Pacific Railway dining cars in the 1950s before beginning university. Carney earned a Bachelor of Arts and a Master of Education from the University of British Columbia, followed by a Doctor of Education from the University of Alberta.

== Career ==
Carney worked as a principal and superintendent of schools in the Northwest Territories. In 1962, he became the principal of the Joseph Burr Tyrrell School, a federal day school in Fort Smith. (Note: Joseph Burr Tyrell School was a day school attended by both Indigenous and non-Indigenous children. Some Indigenous children who attended the school lived at Breynat Hall, a student residence built in the 1950s by the Canadian government and operated by the Catholic church.) He later served on the board of the Newman Theological College, and as executive director of the Alberta Catholic School Trustees' Association before becoming employed at the University of Alberta. He was an associate professor at the university from 1967 to 1971.

In March 1965, Carney was interviewed by CBC Radio concerning his work as a principal in the Northwest Territories. During the interview, he was asked about a program for "culturally retarded children" (Note: The term retarded was in frequent use at the time of the CBC Radio interview, appearing widely in books and articles. Retardation is defined as the act or result of delaying.) at the Joseph B. Tyrrell school, where he was principal. When asked to define a "culturally retarded child", Carney replied: "a culturally retarded child in the context of the Northwest Territories is a child from a Native background who for various reasons has not been in regular attendance in school". His remarks resurfaced in 2025 after the election of Mark Carney, with some online posts incorrectly referring to Robert Carney as a residential school principal.

In 1975, Carney was appointed as deputy minister of the Alberta department of recreation, parks and wildlife. Prior to the appointment he held the role of executive director of the Alberta Northern Development Group. In 1976, Carney was appointed as deputy director for operations of Department of Indian Affairs in the Alberta region.

Carney was a candidate in the 1980 Canadian federal election, running as a Liberal in the riding of Edmonton South. He placed second in the election.

In 1991, Carney conducted interviews with 240 former residential school students as part of a study commissioned by the church. He subsequently published a report detailing allegations of physical abuse within the schools, noting 15 alleged instances of sexual assault which took place at residential schools in the Western Arctic. News coverage following the report prompted Carney to clarify that abuse was not the focus of the report, writing to the Edmonton Journal that "a number of interviewees expressed positive comments about their experiences in residential schools and hostels, while others deplored what they described as the excessive attention given to negative incidents related to these institutions". He later criticized the 1996 Royal Commission on Aboriginal Peoples for being "dominated" by "the Aboriginal perspective".

Carney was employed at the University of Alberta as Professor of Education Foundations, and retired as professor emeritus. He died on 9 December 2009 in Nanaimo, British Columbia.

== Personal life ==
Carney married his wife, Verlie Margaret (née Kemper) in 1957. Together they had four children; among them Mark Carney, the 24th prime minister of Canada. He was a Catholic.

== Publications ==
=== Academic works ===
- Carney, Robert J.; Ferguson, W. O. (1965). A Selected and Annotated Bibliography on Sociology of Eskimo Education. Edmonton, AB: University of Alberta Press. ISBN 978-1-7721-2238-1. OCLC 1277050.
- — (1971). Relations in education between the federal and territorial governments and the Roman Catholic Church in the Mackenzie District, Northwest Territories, 1867-1961 (Doctor of Philosophy thesis). Edmonton, AB: University of Alberta Library. OCLC 849932066.
- — (1983). "Inuit rights and Inuit school programs: a study in political socialization". New Education. 5 (61). ISSN 0156-0905. OCLC 7129040257.
- — (1989). Going to school in Upper Canada: a study of formal education in nineteenth century Ontario. Department of Educational Foundations. Edmonton, AB: University of Alberta. OCLC 65726072.

=== Selected articles ===
- Carney, Robert J. (20 November 1996). "Threat to education rights of minorities". Edmonton Journal – via Newspapers.com.
- — (1 January 2000). "The chocolate bar protest". The Vancouver Sun – via Newspapers.com.

== Electoral history ==
1980 Canadian federal election: Edmonton South
Party	Candidate	Votes
Progressive Conservative	Douglas Roche	24,839
Liberal	Robert J. Carney	10,673
New Democratic	Gordon Fearn	4,772
Independent	Robert T. Cristall	318
Marxist–Leninist	Mary Joyce	70
Source(s) "Election Results: General Election (1980-02-18 - 1980-02-18)". Elections Canada.
