= Edmonton—Leduc =

Former federal electoral district in Alberta, Canada

Coordinates: 53.34°N 113.57°W

Alberta electoral district
- Edmonton–Leduc in relation to other federal electoral districts in Edmonton

Defunct federal electoral district
- Legislature: House of Commons
- District created: 2003
- District abolished: 2013
- First contested: 2004
- Last contested: 2011
- District webpage: profile, map

Demographics
- Population (2011): 150,234
- Electors (2011): 92,861
- Area (km²): 421.23
- Census division: Division No. 11
- Census subdivision(s): Edmonton, Leduc, Leduc County, Devon

Edmonton—Leduc was a federal electoral district in Alberta, Canada, that was represented in the House of Commons of Canada from 2004 to 2015. As a result of changes to the Electoral Boundaries Readjustment Act, based on the 2011 census, the number of seats in the House of Commons of Canada increased from 308 to 338. Alberta's seat count increased from 28 to 34. The riding was redistributed into the new ridings of Edmonton Riverbend and Edmonton—Wetaskiwin.

== Geography ==
The district includes a southwestern portion of Edmonton, the town of Devon and the city of Leduc and its vicinity.

== History ==
The electoral district was created in 2003 as a result of the creation of two extra Alberta seats. It is composed from the following previous ridings: 55.5% from Edmonton Southwest, 20.9% from Edmonton—Strathcona, and 23.6% from Wetaskiwin.

=== Member of Parliament ===
This riding has elected the following members of Parliament:

| Parliament | Years | Member | Party |
|---|---|---|---|
Edmonton—Leduc; Riding created from Edmonton Southwest, Edmonton—Strathcona and Wetaskiwin
| 38th | 2004–2006 | James Rajotte | Conservative |
| 39th | 2006–2008 | James Rajotte | Conservative |
| 40th | 2008–2011 | James Rajotte | Conservative |
| 41st | 2011–2015 | James Rajotte | Conservative |
Riding dissolved into Edmonton Riverbend and Edmonton—Wetaskiwin

=== Most recent member of Parliament ===
Its last sitting member of Parliament was James Rajotte, a former executive assistant. He was first elected to Parliament in the 2000 election. He is a member of the Conservative Party of Canada.

== Elections results ==
2011 Canadian federal election
| Party | Candidate | Votes | % | ±% | Expenditures |
|---|---|---|---|---|---|
| Conservative | James Rajotte | 37,778 | 63.57 | +0.36 | $74,192.13 |
| New Democratic | Artem Medvedev | 11,488 | 19.33 | +7.91 | $14,958.39 |
| Liberal | Richard Fahlman | 7,270 | 12.23 | –5.36 | $22,040.94 |
| Green | Valerie Kennedy | 2,896 | 4.87 | –2.90 | $7,980.89 |
| Total valid votes/expense limit | | 59,432 | 99.75 | – | $100,857.07 |
| Total rejected ballots | | 149 | 0.25 | +0.03 | |
| Turnout | | 59,581 | 58.68 | +2.04 | |
| Eligible voters | | 101,532 | | | |
| Conservative hold | | Swing | | +2.86 | |
Source: Elections Canada

2008 Canadian federal election
| Party | Candidate | Votes | % | ±% | Expenditures |
|---|---|---|---|---|---|
| Conservative | James Rajotte | 33,174 | 63.21 | +2.68 | $79,550.75 |
| Liberal | Donna Lynn Smith | 9,234 | 17.59 | –1.87 | $28,284.05 |
| New Democratic | Hana Razga | 5,994 | 11.42 | –2.36 | $15,380.32 |
| Green | Valerie Kennedy | 4,081 | 7.78 | +1.54 | $1,104.43 |
| Total valid votes/expense limit | | 52,483 | 99.78 | – | $92,972.20 |
| Total rejected ballots | | 118 | 0.22 | +0.02 | |
| Turnout | | 52,601 | 56.64 | –10.16 | |
| Eligible voters | | 92,861 | | | |
| Conservative hold | | Swing | | +2.28 | |
Source: Elections Canada

2006 Canadian federal election
| Party | Candidate | Votes | % | ±% | Expenditures |
|---|---|---|---|---|---|
| Conservative | James Rajotte | 33,764 | 60.53 | +5.48 | $73,388.12 |
| Liberal | Jim Jacuta | 10,856 | 19.46 | –9.86 | $27,463.82 |
| New Democratic | Martin Rybiak | 7,685 | 13.78 | +4.36 | $11,835.76 |
| Green | Benjamin Morrison Pettit | 3,479 | 6.24 | +0.01 | $2,496.41 |
| Total valid votes/expense limit | | 55,784 | 99.80 | – | $81,893.92 |
| Total rejected ballots | | 111 | 0.20 | –0.03 | |
| Turnout | | 55,895 | 66.80 | +1.72 | |
| Eligible voters | | 83,677 | | | |
| Conservative hold | | Swing | | +7.67 | |
Source: Elections Canada

2004 Canadian federal election
| Party | Candidate | Votes | % | ±% | Expenditures |
|---|---|---|---|---|---|
| Conservative | James Rajotte | 26,791 | 55.05 | – | $49,993.80 |
| Liberal | Bruce King | 14,269 | 29.32 | – | $42,485.44 |
| New Democratic | Doug McLachlan | 4,581 | 9.41 | – | $7,763.69 |
| Green | Bruce Sinclair | 3,029 | 6.22 | – | $608.86 |
| Total valid votes/expense limit | | 48,670 | 99.77 | – | $75,614.37 |
| Total rejected ballots | | 111 | 0.23 | – | |
| Turnout | | 48,781 | 65.08 | – | |
| Eligible voters | | 74,959 | | | |
| Conservative notional hold | | Swing | | N/A | |
Source: Elections Canada

== See also ==
- List of Canadian electoral districts
- Historical federal electoral districts of Canada
