= Margaret A. Meyer =

American economist

- Born: June 9, 1959 (age 67)

Academic work
- Institutions: University of Oxford
- Doctoral students: Mark Carney

Margaret Ann "Meg" Meyer FBA (born 9 June 1959) is an American economist whose research interests include microeconomics, organizational economics, and contract theory. She works in England as an Official Fellow in economics in Nuffield College, Oxford.

== Education and career ==
After graduating from the Dalton School, Meyer went to Harvard University, where she earned Phi Beta Kappa and summa cum laude honors as the valedictorian of her class in 1981. She earned a master's degree in economics at the University of Cambridge in 1982, and completed her Ph.D. at Stanford University in 1986.

Prior to becoming a fellow of Nuffield in 1988, Meyer was a junior research fellow in economics in St John's College, Oxford, from 1985 to 1988.

Whilst at Oxford, Meyer was a doctoral advisor to Mark Carney, the 24th and current Prime Minister of Canada. In 2025, the National Post published a report in which three academics accused Mr. Carney of plagiarism, claiming that his doctoral thesis had at least 10 instances of plagiarism. Meyer released a statement: "I believe you are mischaracterizing this work. As an academic of nearly 40 years, I see no evidence of plagiarism in the thesis you cited nor any unusual academic practices."

== Recognition ==
Meyer has been a Member of the Council of the European Economic Association (1994–1997), of the (U.K.) Royal Economic Society (1995–1999) and of the Econometric Society (2009–14). She has been a Member of the Organizing Committee of European Summer Symposium in Economic Theory (Gerzensee, Switzerland) since 1993. Meyer became a Fellow of the Econometric Society in 1998, and a Fellow of the European Economic Association in 2004. She was elected to the British Academy in 2019, and elected a Fellow of the Society for the Advancement of Economic Theory in 2019.

== Personal ==
Meyer's husband is Oxford economist Paul Klemperer.
