= Jim Edwards (Canadian politician) =

Canadian politician

The Honourable Jim Edwards PC

President of the Treasury Board
- In office June 25, 1993 – November 4, 1993
- Prime Minister: Kim Campbell
- Preceded by: Gilles Loiselle
- Succeeded by: Art Eggleton

Member of Parliament for Edmonton Southwest (Edmonton South; 1984–1988)
- In office September 4, 1984 – October 25, 1993
- Preceded by: Douglas Roche
- Succeeded by: Ian McClelland

Personal details
- Born: James Stewart Edwards; August 31, 1936 (age 90) Edmonton, Alberta, Canada
- Party: Progressive Conservative
- Education: University of Alberta

James Stewart Edwards PC (born August 31, 1936) is a former Canadian politician from Alberta.

== Early life ==
James Stewart Edwards was born on August 31, 1936, in Edmonton, Alberta to Donald Stewart Edwards and Verna May Armstrong. Edwards attended the University of Alberta attaining a Bachelor of Arts. He married Sheila Mary Mooney on September 10, 1960, and had four children together. Edwards served as the Commissioner of the Alberta Human Rights Commissioner from 1979 to 1980.

== Political career ==
He was first elected to the House of Commons of Canada in the 1984 general election as a Progressive Conservative (PC) from Alberta. He served as a parliamentary secretary to several ministers in the government of Prime Minister Brian Mulroney.

Following Mulroney's resignation as PC leader and prime minister in 1993, Edwards was a candidate at the PC leadership convention held to choose a successor. He placed third. Edwards ran on a platform of cutting federal spending by $10 billion per year until the deficit and national debt were wiped out, reducing the size of Cabinet from 35 to 20, reviewing defence spending, freezing support to the European Bank for Reconstruction and Development, privatizing all Crown Corporations including Canada Post, and reducing international funding.

He was appointed chief government Whip and President of the Treasury Board in the short-lived cabinet of Prime Minister Kim Campbell. He lost his seat in that year's 1993 election that reduced the Tories to only two members of Parliament in the House.

== Later life ==
Edwards was the president and CEO of Economic Development Edmonton from 1998 to 2002 and served as the chair of the board of governors at the University of Alberta from March 2002 to 2006. Edwards received an honorary Doctor of Laws from the University of Alberta in 2006.
