= Terry Nugent =

Canadian politician

Terence James "Terry" Nugent
- Official 1966 portrait

Member of the Canadian Parliament for Edmonton—Strathcona
- In office 1958–1968
- Preceded by: Sydney Herbert Thompson
- Succeeded by: Hu Harries

Personal details
- Born: December 9, 1920 Taber, Alberta, Canada
- Died: April 13, 2006 (aged 85)
- Party: Progressive Conservative

Terence James Nugent (December 9, 1920 – April 13, 2006) was a barrister, lawyer and World War II era soldier. He was also a Canadian federal politician from 1958 to 1968 and an alderman in the city of Edmonton, Alberta from 1968 to 1971.

Born in Taber, Alberta, Nugent enlisted in the Canadian Expeditionary Force in 1942. He served in World War II and left the army in 1946.

He first ran as a Progressive Conservative for a House of Commons of Canada seat in the Edmonton—Strathcona district for the 1957 federal election. He was defeated by Social Credit candidate Sydney Thompson and finished third out of fourth place behind defeated incumbent Member of Parliament Richmond Hanna. The following year Nugent ran for office again in the 1958 federal election winning with a landslide defeating both Hanna and Thompson in a rematch to win his first term in office. The same election saw Nugent's party—which had been in power for a year with a minority government led by John Diefenbaker—returned with the largest majority government in Canadian history.

Nugent was re-elected in the 1962 federal election with a significantly narrower margin then his victory in 1958 – his plurality dropping by almost 10,000 votes in the election that reduced the Diefenbaker Tories to a minority government.

During the Cuban Missile Crisis Nugent stood in parliament and asked MPs to refuse to support the American government should it threaten to invade Cuba saying "One of the fundamental facts we must recognize is that Cuba is an independent, sovereign nation ... we may not like its form of government but I suggest that whether it is a small country or a large country, or whether it is a country that is friendly to us or not, it is a sovereign state and those of us who believe in the rights of sovereign states as subscribed to in the United Nations charter, must concede that big or small, friendly or unfriendly, whether we like it or not, that country has the same rights as we have." Nugent received some 300 telegrams of support from Canadians following his speech.

Parliament was dissolved after the minority government fell leading to the 1963 federal election. Nugent faced former MP John Decore defeating him by just 2000 votes to win his third and final term in office. The 1968 federal election saw Nugent defeated by Liberal candidate Hu Harries. After his defeat Nugent sought a career in Edmonton municipal politics.

Nugent ran for a seat on Edmonton city council in the 1968 Edmonton municipal election, he won and served a term in office until 1971. He ran again in Ward 3 in the 1974 Edmonton municipal election but was defeated.
