= Sydney Herbert Thompson =

Canadian politician

Sydney Herbert Stewart Thompson

Member of the Canadian Parliament for Edmonton—Strathcona
- In office 1957–1958
- Preceded by: Richmond Francis Hanna
- Succeeded by: Terry Nugent

Personal details
- Born: September 23, 1920 Athabasca, Alberta, Canada
- Died: November 26, 1997 (aged 77) Kelowna, British Columbia, Canada
- Party: Social Credit Party of Canada
- Spouse(s): Dora Lilian Phillips (m. 8 Apr 1947)

Sydney Herbert Stewart Thompson (September 23, 1920 – November 26, 1997) was a merchant and served as a Social Credit Party of Canada Member of Parliament from 1957 to 1958.

Thompson first ran for a seat in the House of Commons of Canada for the 1957 Canadian federal election. He defeated incumbent Richmond Francis Hanna to win the Edmonton—Strathcona electoral district. Thompson was defeated a year later by Terry Nugent in the 1958 federal election.
