= Hu Harries =

Canadian economist and politician

Member of the Canadian Parliament for Edmonton—Strathcona
- In office 1968–1972
- Preceded by: Terry Nugent
- Succeeded by: Douglas Roche

Personal details
- Born: December 8, 1921 Strathmore, Alberta
- Died: August 26, 1986 (aged 64)
- Party: Liberal
- Spouse: Joyce Maxine Farrell
- Children: 6 children

Hu Harries (December 8, 1921 – August 26, 1986) was a Canadian economist and politician.

Born in Strathmore, Alberta, he earned a Bachelor of Science in agriculture from the University of Alberta in 1945. He also received a master's degree in political science from the University of Toronto and a doctorate in economics from Iowa State University. His area of expertise related to the oil industry and transportation.

From 1958 to 1960, he was the director of the School of Commerce in the Faculty of Arts and Science at the University of Alberta. From 1960 to 1968, he was the first dean of the new Faculty of Commerce. As well, he ran his own economic consultants firm, Hu Harries and Associates Ltd. He was a consultant with the World Bank and worked with the governments of Alberta, Manitoba and British Columbia. He also operated a vineyard; had three ranches in Alberta and British Columbia where he raised pure-bred black angus cattle; ran three racehorse transport companies in Alberta, Ontario, and Quebec; and formed the Hertz Truck Rental franchise in Edmonton. Hu was a well-regarded horseman and competed in many rodeos with his horse Docs Twister.

Harries entered politics as an alderman on Edmonton City Council from 1953 to 1959. He was elected to the House of Commons of Canada for the riding of Edmonton—Strathcona in 1968 federal election as a Liberal. He defeated Progressive Conservative (PC) incumbent Terry Nugent by 5,846 votes amidst "Trudeaumania", the wave of popularity that followed the then-new Prime Minister, Pierre Trudeau. He lost his seat in the 1972 election to PC challenger Douglas Roche by a 10,283-vote margin. He attempted a comeback at Edmonton West in 1980, but he lost to long-serving PC MP Marcel Lambert by 8,731 votes.

In the late 1970s, Harries unsuccessfully tried to form a political party called the National Party of Canada (not to be confused with the National Party led by Robin Mathews in 1979 or the National Party led by Mel Hurtig in 1993).

He married Joyce Maxine Farrell in 1948. They had six children: Tommy, Bruce, Jody, Lori, Jeff and Dan.
