= James Rajotte =

Canadian politician (born 1970)

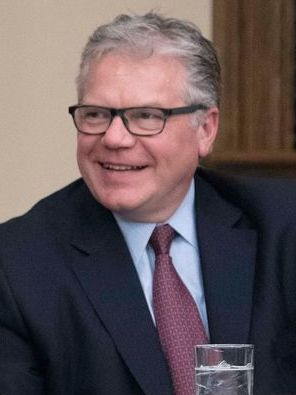
- Rajotte in 2022

Member of Parliament for Edmonton—Leduc Edmonton Southwest (2000–2004)
- In office November 27, 2000 – August 4, 2015
- Preceded by: Ian McClelland
- Succeeded by: Matt Jeneroux

Personal details
- Born: August 19, 1970 (age 55) Edmonton, Alberta, Canada
- Party: Conservative
- Other political affiliations: Canadian Alliance (2000–2003)
- Spouse: single
- Profession: Executive assistant, political researcher

James Rajotte (born August 19, 1970) is a Canadian politician who currently serves as Alberta's senior representative to the United States. He served as a Member of Parliament from 2004 to 2015.

As a member of the Conservative Party of Canada in the House of Commons of Canada, Rajotte was chair of Parliament's Standing Committee on Finance. Previously he was chair of the Standing Committee on Industry, Science and Technology. He represented the riding of Edmonton Southwest from 2000 to 2004. In the 2004 federal election he was elected in the newly created riding of Edmonton-Leduc. He was re-elected in Edmonton-Leduc in the 2006 and 2008 federal elections. He was first elected as a Canadian Alliance MP in 2000, and was also one of four Alliance MPs who agreed to sit with the Progressive Conservative caucus after the December 9, 2003 creation of the Conservative Party, as the Alliance and Progressive Conservative parliamentary caucuses were not officially merged into a single caucus until a few weeks later.

Rajotte is a former executive assistant and researcher. Rajotte was the CPC official opposition critic for Industry and also fulfilled the role of opposition critic for Science, Research and Development. His interests include classical music and literature.

== Electoral record ==
2008 Canadian federal election
Party	Candidate	Votes	%	±%	Expenditures
Conservative	James Rajotte	33,174	63.2%	+2.7%	$81,190
Liberal	Donna Lynn Smith	9,234	17.6%	-1.9%	$29,456
New Democratic	Hana Razga	5,994	11.4%	-2.4%	$15,390
Green	Valerie Kennedy	4,081	7.8%	+1.6%	$1,154
Total valid votes/Expense limit		52,483	100%	$92,972	
Total rejected ballots		118			
Turnout		52,601	%		

2006 Canadian federal election
Party	Candidate	Votes	%	±%
Conservative	James Rajotte	33,764	60.53%	+5.49%
Liberal	Jim Jacuta	10,856	19.46%	-9.85%
New Democratic	Martin Rybiak	7,685	13.78%	+4.37%
Green	Ben Morrison Pettit	3,479	6.24%	+0.02%
Total valid votes		55,784	100.00%	

2004 Canadian federal election
Party	Candidate	Votes	%	±%	Expenditures
Conservative	James Rajotte	26,791	55.04%	-	$54,847
Liberal	Bruce King	14,269	29.31%	-	$46,445
New Democratic	Doug McLachlan	4,581	9.41%	-	$7,563
Green	Bruce Sinclair	3,029	6.22%	–	$107
Total valid votes		48,670	100.00%		
Total rejected ballots		111	0.23%		
Turnout		48,781	65.08%		

2000 Canadian federal election: Edmonton Southwest
Party	Candidate	Votes	%	±%	Expenditures
Alliance	James Rajotte	26,197	48.85	–2.49	$47,590
Liberal	Chiu Lau	18,223	33.98	+0.43	$63,679
Progressive Conservative	Joseph Fernando	5,803	10.82	+0.86	$13,273
New Democratic	Bernie Keeler	2,746	5.12	+0.44	$13,321
Green	Jerry Paschen	462	0.86	–	$478
Natural Law	Wade McKinley	195	0.36	–0.10	none listed
Total valid votes		53,626	99.77		
Total rejected ballots		126	0.23	+0.08	
Turnout		53,752	64.07	+1.44	
Eligible voters		83,890			
Alliance hold		Swing		–1.46	
Source: Elections Canada

Political offices
Preceded by Rob Merrifield	Chair of the Standing Committee on Finance; February 3, 2009 – August 2, 2015	Succeeded by Wayne Easter
Preceded by Brent St. Denis	Chair of the Standing Committee on Industry, Science & Technology; May 9, 2006 – February 3, 2009	Succeeded by Michael Chong
