= Hugh Hanrahan =

Canadian politician (1947–1999)

Hugh F. Hanrahan

Member of the Canadian Parliament for Edmonton Strathcona
- In office 1993–1997
- Preceded by: Scott Thorkelson
- Succeeded by: Rahim Jaffer

Personal details
- Born: 16 January 1947 Antigonish, Nova Scotia, Canada
- Died: 19 May 1999 (aged 52)
- Party: Reform Party of Canada
- Spouse: Dianne Hanrahan (m. 1970)
- Children: Margaret Hanrahan
- Occupation: Author and teacher

Hugh F. Hanrahan (16 January 1947 – 19 May 1999) was a member of the House of Commons of Canada for the Edmonton—Strathcona electoral district from 1993 to 1997. His career has been in education and writing.

Hanrahan was born in Antigonish, Nova Scotia, where he would study arts and education at St. Francis Xavier University, then moved to Ottawa to obtain a master's degree in education at the University of Ottawa. He moved to Edmonton where he was a teacher in the city's Roman Catholic school system for more than two decades.

He was elected to the 35th Canadian Parliament in the 1993 federal election for the Reform party. He left Canadian politics for health reasons after his term in Parliament ended with the 1997 federal election. In May 1999, Hanrahan died suddenly following an acute stomach infection. He was survived by his wife and daughter.
