= Douglas Roche =

Canadian politician

The Honourable Douglas Roche OC KCSG

Canadian Senator from Alberta
- In office September 17, 1998 – June 14, 2004

Member of Parliament for Edmonton South
- In office May 22, 1979 – September 3, 1984
- Succeeded by: Jim Edwards

Member of Parliament for Edmonton—Strathcona
- In office October 30, 1972 – May 21, 1979
- Preceded by: Hu Harries
- Succeeded by: David Kilgour

Personal details
- Born: Douglas James Roche; June 14, 1929 (age 97) Montreal, Quebec, Canada
- Party: Progressive Conservative Party of Canada
- Occupation: author, diplomat

Douglas James Roche, OC, KCSG (born June 14, 1929) is a Canadian author, parliamentarian, diplomat and peace activist. Roche served as Progressive Conservative Member of Parliament (MP) for Edmonton—Strathcona from 1972 to 1979 and for Edmonton South 1979–1984. In 1984, he was appointed Canada's Ambassador for Disarmament, a position he held until 1989. He was appointed to the Senate of Canada on September 17, 1998, where he served until June 13, 2004. Currently he resides in Edmonton, Alberta.

== History ==
Born in Montreal, Quebec, he was elected as Conservative MP for Edmonton-Strathcona in 1972. He followed this by serving as MP for Edmonton South to 1984.

His Liberal opponent in the 1980 election was Robert Carney, father of future Canadian Prime Minister Mark Carney. He did not run for re-election in 1984.

In 1984, he was appointed Canada's Ambassador for Disarmament. He has long been concerned with the issue of nuclear disarmament.

He was elected Chairman of the United Nations Disarmament Committee, the main United Nations body dealing with political and security issues, at the 43rd General Assembly in 1988. He is also the author of twenty books, and has contributed chapters to thirteen more, including Creative Dissent: A Politician's Struggle for Peace (Novalis, 2008).

From 1989 to 2001, he was appointed Visiting Professor at the University of Alberta, where he taught "War or Peace in the 21st Century?" In 1997, he was chosen by the Students' Union to receive a SALUTE Award for "outstanding contributions to students".

He is an Officer of the Order of Canada, and a leading organizer of the project in which more than 500 members of the Order of Canada have endorsed a call for Canada to commit to working with other countries to achieve a Nuclear Weapons Convention, which would be a global ban on nuclear weapons.

He is the founding Chairman of the Middle Powers Initiative, co-sponsored by eight international non-governmental organizations specializing in nuclear disarmament; he now serves as Senior Advisor to the current Chairman, Ambassador Henrik Salander of Sweden.

In 1995, Pope John Paul II presented him with the Papal Medal for his service as Special Adviser on disarmament and security matters. In 1998, the Holy See named him a Knight Commander of the Order of St. Gregory the Great.

Roche has served as President of the United Nations Association in Canada and was elected in 1985 as Honorary President of the World Federation of United Nations Associations. He was the founding President of Parliamentarians for Global Action, an international network of 1,300 parliamentarians in 99 countries, and wrote The Case for a United Nations Parliamentary Assembly in 2002. He was also founding editor of the Western Catholic Reporter (1965–1972), International Chairman (1990–1996) of Global Education Associates, and co-founder of the Canadian International Institute of Applied Negotiation (CIIAN) in 1992, which is dedicated to the prevention and resolution of destructive conflict.

In 2009, Roche was the recipient of the Distinguished Service Award of the Canadian Association of Former Parliamentarians, "presented annually to a former parliamentarian who has made an outstanding contribution to the country and its democratic institutions." Roche was cited in particular "for his years of Parliamentary service, for his contribution to and respect for the institution of Parliament and for his continued interest and activity in the promotion of human welfare, human rights and parliamentary democracy in Canada and abroad."

Roche endorsed Alberta MP Heather McPherson in the 2026 New Democratic Party leadership election.

== Published works ==
- Roche, Douglas J. (1976). Justice not charity: a new global ethic for Canada. Toronto: McClelland and Stewart. ISBN 978-0-7710-7680-0.
- Roche, Douglas J. (1983). Politicians for peace: a new global network of legislators working for human survival. Toronto: NC Press. ISBN 978-0-919601-83-3.
- Roche, Douglas J. (1989). Building global security: agenda for the 1990's. Toronto: NC Press. ISBN 978-1-55021-057-6.
- Roche, Douglas (1993). A bargain for humanity : global security by 2000. Edmonton: University of Alberta Press. ISBN 978-0-88864-254-7.
- Roche, Douglas J. (1995). An unacceptable risk : nuclear weapons in a volatile world. Santa Barbara, CA: Nuclear Age Peace Foundation. ISBN 978-1-895722-12-3.
- Roche, Douglas J. (1997). "Expanding Human Loyalties". In Milne, Tom (ed.). World citizenship: allegiance to humanity. New York: St. Martin's Press. ISBN 978-0-312-17359-3.
- Roche, Douglas J. (1997). The ultimate evil: the fight to ban nuclear weapons. Toronto: J. Lorimer. ISBN 978-1-55028-590-1.
- Roche, Douglas J. (2011). How we stopped loving the bomb : an insider's account of the world on the brink of nuclear disarmament. Toronto: J. Lorimer. ISBN 978-1-55277-652-0.

== Archives ==
There is a Douglas Roche fonds at Library and Archives Canada.

== See also ==
- List of peace activists

Parliament of Canada
Preceded by Hu Harries	Member of Parliament Edmonton—Strathcona; 1972–1979	Succeeded by David Kilgour
Preceded by New District	Member of Parliament Edmonton South; 1979–1984	Succeeded by Jim Edwards
Preceded by Bud Olson	Senator from Alberta; 1998–2004	Succeeded by Elaine McCoy; Grant Mitchell; Claudette Tardif
