= Scott Thorkelson =

Canadian politician (1958–2007)

Scott Jon Thorkelson

Member of Parliament for Edmonton—Strathcona
- In office November 21, 1988 – October 25, 1993
- Preceded by: David Kilgour
- Succeeded by: Hugh Hanrahan

Personal details
- Born: 2 March 1958 Gimli, Manitoba, Canada
- Died: 19 May 2007 (aged 49) Edmonton, Alberta, Canada
- Party: Conservative
- Spouse: Allison Boychuk
- Education: University of Alberta (BA); Harvard University (MPA)

Scott Jon Thorkelson (2 March 1958 – 19 May 2007) was a Canadian politician. He served as a member of Parliament (MP), representing the riding of Edmonton Strathcona in the House of Commons of Canada from 1988 to 1993. His background was in research, consulting, and fundraising.

== Early life ==
Born in Gimli, Manitoba, Canada, Thorkelson became active with the Progressive Conservative (PC) Party as a youth auxiliary leader and as an assistant to John Allen Fraser, Minister of Fisheries and Oceans in the mid-1980s in the Brian Mulroney government.

== Political career ==
Thorkelson was elected as a PC MP in the 1988 federal election at the Edmonton—Strathcona electoral district, which was open after its previous MP, David Kilgour, ran in the new constituency of Edmonton Southeast. He served in the 34th Canadian Parliament but lost to Hugh Hanrahan of the Reform Party as part of the electoral wipeout of the Progressive Conservatives at the 1993 federal election.

== Death ==
Thorkelson died unexpectedly in Edmonton at his parents' residence due to a heart attack at age 49.
