= Richmond Francis Hanna =

Canadian politician

Richmond Francis Lionel Hanna

Member of the Canadian Parliament for Edmonton—Strathcona
- In office 1953–1957
- Preceded by: riding established
- Succeeded by: Sydney Herbert Thompson

Personal details
- Born: 26 February 1913 Monaghan, United Kingdom of Great Britain and Ireland
- Died: 17 January 1985 (aged 71)
- Party: Liberal

Richmond Francis Lionel Hanna (26 February 1913 – 17 January 1985) was an insurance salesman, a Flight Lieutenant in the Royal Canadian Air Force, a member of Edmonton Municipal Council and served as a Canadian federal politician from 1953 to 1957.

Born in Monaghan, Ireland, Hanna first ran for a seat in the House of Commons of Canada in the 1953 Canadian federal election. He defeated former Member of Parliament Orvis A. Kennedy to win the new riding of Edmonton—Strathcona. Kennedy would run for re-election in the 1957 Canadian federal election and be defeated by Social Credit candidate Sydney Herbert Thompson. Hanna would run for office once more in the 1958 Canadian federal election but be defeated by Progressive Conservative candidate Terry Nugent.
