= Edmonton Southwest =

Former federal electoral district in Alberta, Canada

Alberta electoral district

Defunct federal electoral district
- Legislature: House of Commons
- District created: 1987
- District abolished: 2004
- First contested: 1988
- Last contested: 2000

Edmonton Southwest was a federal electoral district in Alberta, Canada, that was represented in the House of Commons of Canada from 1988 to 2003.

== History ==
This riding was created in 1987 from Edmonton South and Edmonton West ridings. It was abolished in 2003 when it was redistributed into Edmonton—Leduc, Edmonton—Spruce Grove and Edmonton Centre ridings.

== Geography ==
It was located in the city of Edmonton in the province of Alberta.

1987 representation order

1996 representation order

== Demographics ==
Population, 2000	102,210
Electors	83,890
Area (km^{2})	
Population density (people per km^{2})	

=== Members of Parliament ===
Edmonton Southwest
Parliament	Years	Member	Party
District created from Edmonton South and Edmonton West
34th	1988–1993	Jim Edwards	Progressive Conservative
35th	1993–1997	Ian McClelland	Reform
36th	1997–2000	Ian McClelland	Reform
36th	2000–2000	Ian McClelland	Alliance
37th	2000–2003	James Rajotte	Alliance
37th	2003–2004	James Rajotte	Conservative
District redistributed into Edmonton—Leduc, Edmonton—Spruce Grove and Edmonton Centre

== Election results ==
2000 Canadian federal election
Party	Candidate	Votes	%	±%	Expenditures
Alliance	James Rajotte	26,197	48.85	–2.49	$47,590
Liberal	Chiu Lau	18,223	33.98	+0.43	$63,679
Progressive Conservative	Joseph Fernando	5,803	10.82	+0.86	$13,273
New Democratic	Bernie Keeler	2,746	5.12	+0.44	$13,321
Green	Jerry Paschen	462	0.86	–	$478
Natural Law	Wade McKinley	195	0.36	–0.10	none listed
Total valid votes		53,626	99.77		
Total rejected ballots		126	0.23	+0.08	
Turnout		53,752	64.07	+1.44	
Eligible voters		83,890			
Alliance hold		Swing		–1.46	
Source: Elections Canada

1997 Canadian federal election
Party	Candidate	Votes	%	±%	Expenditures
Reform	Ian McClelland	22,697	51.34	+5.89	$62,069
Liberal	Esther Starkman	14,833	33.55	+0.09	$58,880
Progressive Conservative	Ellie Shuster	4,403	9.96	–6.09	$29,078
New Democratic	Richard D. Vanderberg	2,070	4.68	+1.01	$3,187
Natural Law	Wade McKinley	205	0.46	–0.30	none listed
Total valid votes		44,208	99.85		
Total rejected ballots		67	0.15	–0.10	
Turnout		44,275	62.63	–4.87	
Eligible voters		70,689			
Reform hold		Swing		+2.99	
Source: Elections Canada

1993 Canadian federal election
Party	Candidate	Votes	%	±%
Reform	Ian McClelland	26,582	45.45	+34.99
Liberal	Betty Macfarlan	19,570	33.46	+14.24
Progressive Conservative	Jim Edwards	9,385	16.05	–37.53
New Democratic	Colleen Glenn	2,148	3.67	–12.25
Natural Law	Pat Simpson	447	0.76	–
Independent	Kevin Ashmore	269	0.46	–
Marxist–Leninist	Peggy Morton	81	0.14	–
Total valid votes		58,482	99.75	
Total rejected ballots		144	0.25	+0.03
Turnout		58,626	67.50	–8.73
Eligible voters		86,851		
Reform gain from Progressive Conservative		Swing		+24.62
Source: Elections Canada

1988 Canadian federal election
Party	Candidate	Votes	%	±%
Progressive Conservative	Jim Edwards	28,931	53.58	–
Liberal	Barclay W. Johnson	10,375	19.22	–
New Democratic	Bob Friedland	8,598	15.92	–
Reform	Chuck Cripps	5,646	10.46	–
Libertarian	R. John Hayes	356	0.66	–
Confederation of Regions	Curtis Long	86	0.16	–
Total valid votes		53,992	99.78	
Total rejected ballots		119	0.22	–
Turnout		54,111	76.23	–
Eligible voters		70,987		
Progressive Conservative notional hold		Swing		N/A
Source: Elections Canada

== See also ==
- List of Canadian electoral districts
- Historical federal electoral districts of Canada
