= Mark Carney =

Prime Minister of Canada since 2025

The Right Honourable Mark Carney PC OC MP
- Carney in 2026

24th Prime Minister of Canada
- Incumbent
- Assumed office March 14, 2025
- Monarch: Charles III
- Governors General: Mary Simon; Louise Arbour
- Preceded by: Justin Trudeau

Leader of the Liberal Party
- Incumbent
- Assumed office March 9, 2025
- Preceded by: Justin Trudeau

Member of Parliament for Nepean
- Incumbent
- Assumed office April 28, 2025
- Preceded by: Chandra Arya
Central bank roles
120th Governor of the Bank of England
In office July 1, 2013 – March 15, 2020
Appointed by	George Osborne
Preceded by	Sir Mervyn King
Succeeded by	Andrew Bailey
2nd Chair of the Financial Stability Board
In office November 4, 2011 – November 26, 2018
Preceded by	Mario Draghi
Succeeded by	Randal Quarles
8th Governor of the Bank of Canada
In office February 1, 2008 – June 3, 2013
Prime Minister	Stephen Harper
Preceded by	David A. Dodge
Succeeded by	Stephen Poloz
Deputy Governor of the Bank of Canada
In office August 10, 2003 – November 15, 2004
Prime Minister	Paul Martin
Governor	David A. Dodge
Preceded by	Paul Jenkins
Succeeded by	Tiff Macklem
Other offices held
United Nations Special Envoy for Climate Action and Finance
In office December 1, 2019 – January 15, 2025
Appointed by	António Guterres
Senior Associate Deputy Minister of Finance
In office November 15, 2004 – February 4, 2007
Prime Minister	Paul Martin; Stephen Harper
Preceded by	Kevin G. Lynch
Succeeded by	Michael Horgan

Personal details
- Born: Mark Joseph Carney; March 16, 1965 (age 61) Fort Smith, Northwest Territories, Canada
- Citizenship: Canada; Republic of Ireland (1980s–2025); United Kingdom (2018–2025)
- Party: Liberal
- Spouse: Diana Fox (m. 1994)
- Children: 4
- Parent: Robert J. Carney (father)
- Education: Harvard University (BA); University of Oxford (MPhil, DPhil)

Academic background
- Thesis: The dynamic advantage of competition (1995)
- Doctoral advisor: Margaret A. Meyer
- Influences: Galbraith; Schumpeter

Academic work
- Discipline: Economics
- School or tradition: New neoclassical synthesis
- Mark Carney's voice from the Today program on BBC Radio 4, August 8, 2013

Mark Joseph Carney (born March 16, 1965) is a Canadian politician and economist who is the 24th prime minister of Canada and leader of the Liberal Party, serving since 2025. Carney has been the member of Parliament (MP) for Nepean since his election in April 2025. He was previously Governor of the Bank of Canada from 2008 to 2013 and Governor of the Bank of England from 2013 to 2020.

Carney was born in Fort Smith, Northwest Territories, and raised in Edmonton, Alberta. He graduated with a bachelor's degree in economics from Harvard University in 1987, and earned a master's degree in 1993 and a doctorate in 1995 from the University of Oxford, both in economics. Carney worked at Goldman Sachs for 13 years before joining the Bank of Canada in 2003 as a deputy governor. In 2004, he joined the Department of Finance Canada as a senior associate deputy minister. Carney served as the eighth governor of the Bank of Canada from 2008 to 2013. As governor, he oversaw Canadian monetary policy during the 2008 global financial crisis. He was appointed as the second chair of the Financial Stability Board in 2011, serving for two terms until 2018. After his term as Governor of the Bank of Canada, Carney was appointed as the 120th governor of the Bank of England, becoming the first non-British incumbent. He served from 2013 to 2020, leading the central bank's responses to Brexit and the early phase of the COVID-19 pandemic.

Following his governorship, Carney held several roles in the private and public sectors. He served as chair of Bloomberg L.P., vice-chair at Brookfield Asset Management, and co-chair of the World Bank's private sector investment lab. He was the United Nations Secretary-General's Special Envoy on Climate Action and Finance from 2020. He was an informal advisor to Canadian prime minister Justin Trudeau at the beginning of the COVID-19 pandemic, before returning to the private sector. After Trudeau announced his resignation in 2025, Carney won the Liberal Party leadership election in a landslide victory. The first prime minister never to have held elected office, Carney then advised the governor general to dissolve Parliament and trigger a federal election. In that election, he led the Liberals to a minority government—overturning previous poor opinion polling to win the party's fourth consecutive mandate since 2015—and was elected to represent the riding of Nepean in the House of Commons. A year later, Carney's Liberals formed a majority government as a result of opposition MPs crossing the floor and by-election victories.

During his tenure as prime minister, Carney removed the federal consumer carbon tax, enacted the One Canadian Economy Act in response to a trade war with the United States, and launched the Build Canada Homes agency. In foreign policy, defending a realpolitik approach contrary to his predecessor, Carney's government oversaw a sharp increase in defence spending, formally recognized the State of Palestine, improved relations with China and India, and has continued support for Ukraine in the Russo-Ukrainian war. Carney is ideologically characterized as a centrist, technocrat, and a Blue Grit Liberal; as prime minister, he has moved the Liberals towards the political centre.

== Early life and education ==
Mark Joseph Carney was born on March 16, 1965, at St. Ann's General Hospital in Fort Smith, Northwest Territories. He has three siblings: an older brother and sister, Seán and Brenda, and a younger brother, Brian. When Carney was six, his family moved to Edmonton, Alberta's Laurier Heights where he was raised.

Carney is the son of Verlie Margaret (née Kemper), a stay-at-home mother originally from Britannia Beach, British Columbia, and Robert J. Carney, a high school principal and Professor of Educational Foundations at the University of Alberta. His father was the Liberal candidate for Edmonton South in the 1980 federal election, placing second. His mother returned to university to pursue a career in education when Carney was ten. Three of his four grandparents were Irish, from Aughagower in County Mayo.

Carney graduated as valedictorian in the class of 1983 from St. Francis Xavier High School, Edmonton, Alberta. From there, he went on to study at Harvard University with a partial scholarship and financial aid. During his Harvard years, he was backup goalie for the varsity ice hockey team and was a roommate of future NHL general manager Peter Chiarelli and former ice hockey player Mark Benning. He lived at Winthrop House, and graduated in 1987 with a bachelor's degree in economics magna cum laude.

After Harvard, he travelled to Europe to study at the University of Oxford. There, he undertook postgraduate studies at St Peter's College and Nuffield College, where he received Master of Philosophy (MPhil) and Doctor of Philosophy (DPhil) degrees in economics in 1993 and 1995, respectively. His master's thesis was titled "Competitive advantage and the advantage of competition: a theoretical analysis of national champions, learning-by-doing and spillovers", and his doctoral thesis was titled "The dynamic advantage of competition". His doctoral advisor was Margaret Meyer. While at Oxford, he was co-captain of the Oxford University Ice Hockey Club alongside fellow Canadian David Lametti, whom he would later appoint as Permanent Representative of Canada to the UN.

In 2021, Carney was elected to Harvard University's Board of Overseers through to 2027. He resigned in early 2025, around the time he assumed leadership of the Liberal Party.

== Financial career ==
Carney spent 13 years at investment bank Goldman Sachs initially from 1988 to 1993 and thereafter from 1995 to 2003. He worked in their Boston, London, New York City, Tokyo, and Toronto offices. His progressively more senior positions included co-head of sovereign risk, executive director for emerging debt capital markets, and managing director for investment banking. He worked on South Africa's post-apartheid venture into international bond markets, and was involved in Goldman's work with the 1998 Russian financial crisis.

In 2003, Carney left Goldman Sachs to join the Bank of Canada as a deputy governor. One year later, he was recruited to the Department of Finance Canada as senior associate deputy minister, beginning on November 15, 2004.

From November 2004 to October 2007, Carney was the senior associate deputy minister and G7 deputy in the Department of Finance Canada. He served under two finance ministers: Ralph Goodale, a Liberal; and Jim Flaherty, a Conservative. During this time, Carney oversaw the Government of Canada's controversial plan to tax income trusts at source. Carney was also the lead on the federal government's profitable sale of its 19 per cent stake in Petro-Canada.

=== Governor of the Bank of Canada (2008–2013) ===
In October 2007, Carney was appointed Governor of the Bank of Canada. He immediately left his position at the Department of Finance to become an advisor to the outgoing governor, David Dodge, before formally assuming Dodge's position on February 1, 2008. Carney was selected over Paul Jenkins, the senior deputy governor, who had been considered the front-runner to succeed Dodge.

Carney took on this role at the beginning of the 2008 financial crisis. At the time of his appointment, Carney was the youngest central bank governor among the G8 and G20 nations.

==== 2008 financial crisis ====
Carney's actions as Governor of the Bank of Canada are said to have played a major role in helping Canada avoid the worst impacts of the 2008 financial crisis.

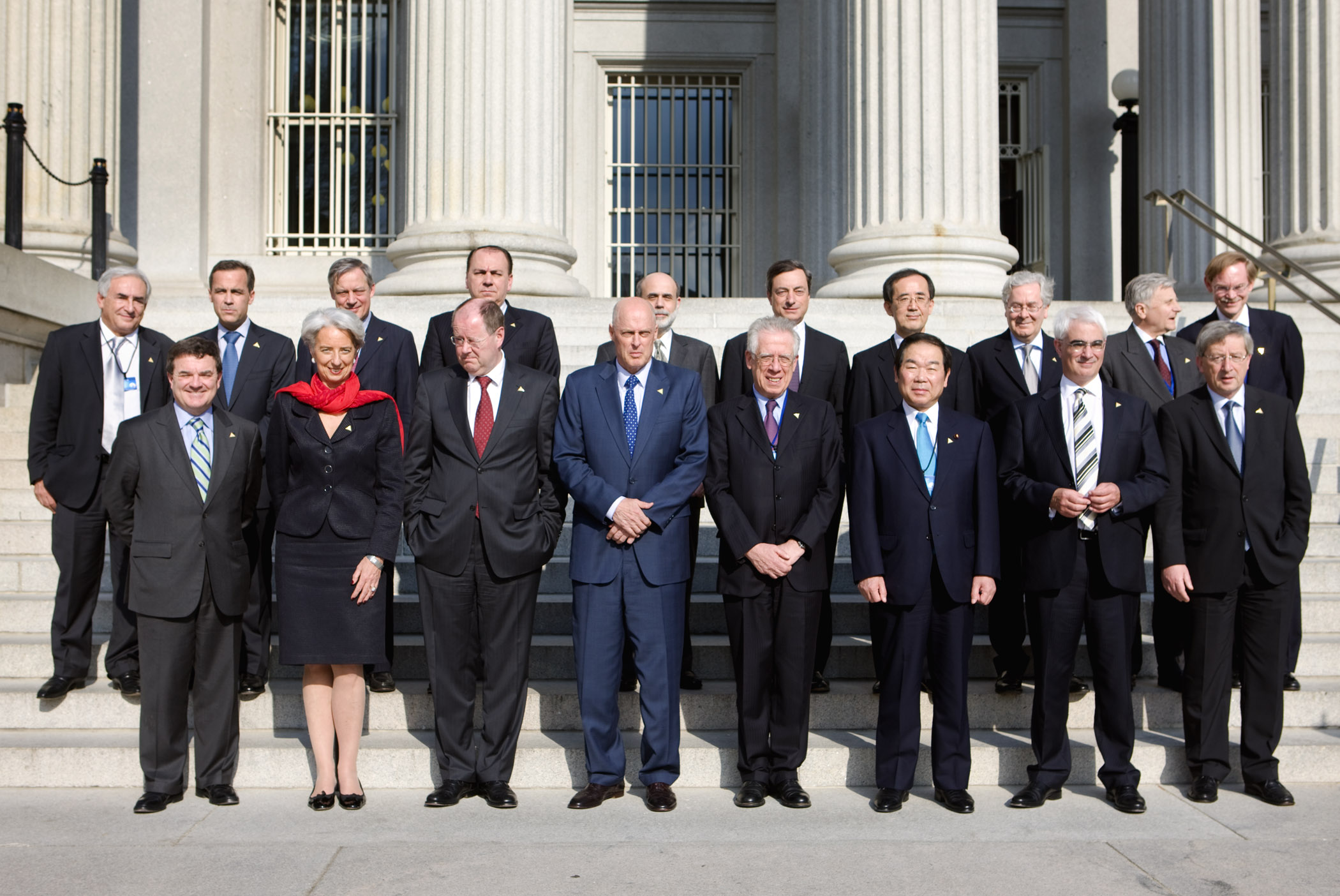
Carney, then governor of the Bank of Canada, stands in the back row with other central bank governors during the 2008 G7 finance ministerial summit.

The epoch-making feature of Carney's tenure as governor remains the decision to cut the overnight rate by 50 basis points in March 2008, one month after his appointment. While the European Central Bank delivered a rate increase in July 2008, Carney anticipated the leveraged-loan crisis would trigger global financial contagion. When policy rates in Canada hit the effective lower bound, the central bank combated the crisis with the non-standard monetary tool "conditional commitment" in April 2009 to hold the policy rate for at least one year, in a boost to domestic credit conditions and market confidence. Output and employment began to recover from mid-2009, in part thanks to monetary stimulus. The Canadian economy outperformed those of its G7 peers during the crisis, and Canada was the first G7 nation to have both its Gross Domestic Product (GDP) and employment recover to pre-crisis levels.

The Bank of Canada's decision to provide substantial additional liquidity to the Canadian financial system, and its unusual step of announcing a commitment to keep interest rates at their lowest possible level for one year, appear to have been significant contributors to Canada's weathering of the crisis.

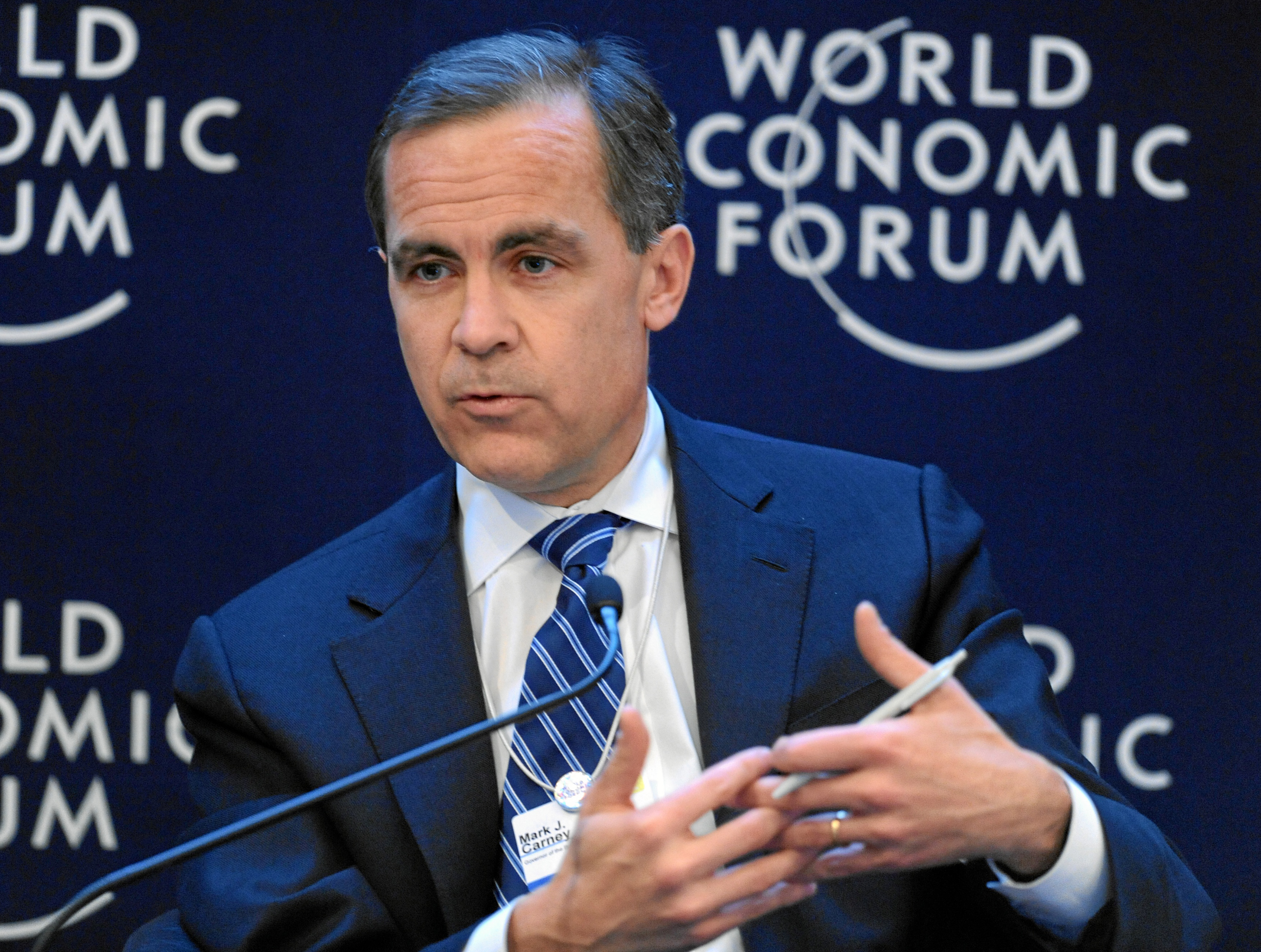
Carney, then governor of the Bank of Canada, speaks at the 2012 World Economic Forum's "Beyond Basel: Financial Institution Regulation" panel.

The commitment to ultra-low lending rates led to a spike in housing prices and household debt. In April 2012, Carney acknowledged there were "issues in some segments of the housing market" and some properties in Canada were "probably overvalued" but he was not overly concerned. He stated low interest rates were not to blame but the onus was on individuals who take out the loans, the banks, and the federal government's mortgage lending rules. Before Carney left for the Bank of England, there were calls to raise rates as Canadians were holding record-level debt and the housing market was overheated.

Canada's risk-averse fiscal and regulatory environment is also cited as a factor. In 2009 a Newsweek columnist wrote, "Canada has done more than survive this financial crisis. The country is positively thriving in it. Canadian banks are well capitalized and poised to take advantage of opportunities that American and European banks cannot seize."

Carney earned various accolades for his leadership during the 2008 financial crisis: he was named one of Financial Times's "Fifty who will frame the way forward" and of Time Magazine's 2010 Time 100. In May 2011, Reader's Digest named him "Editor's Choice for Most Trusted Canadian". In October 2012, Carney was named "Central Bank Governor of the Year 2012" by the editors of Euromoney magazine.

==== International organization memberships ====
Carney was chairman of the Bank for International Settlements' Committee on the Global Financial System from July 2010 until January 2012.

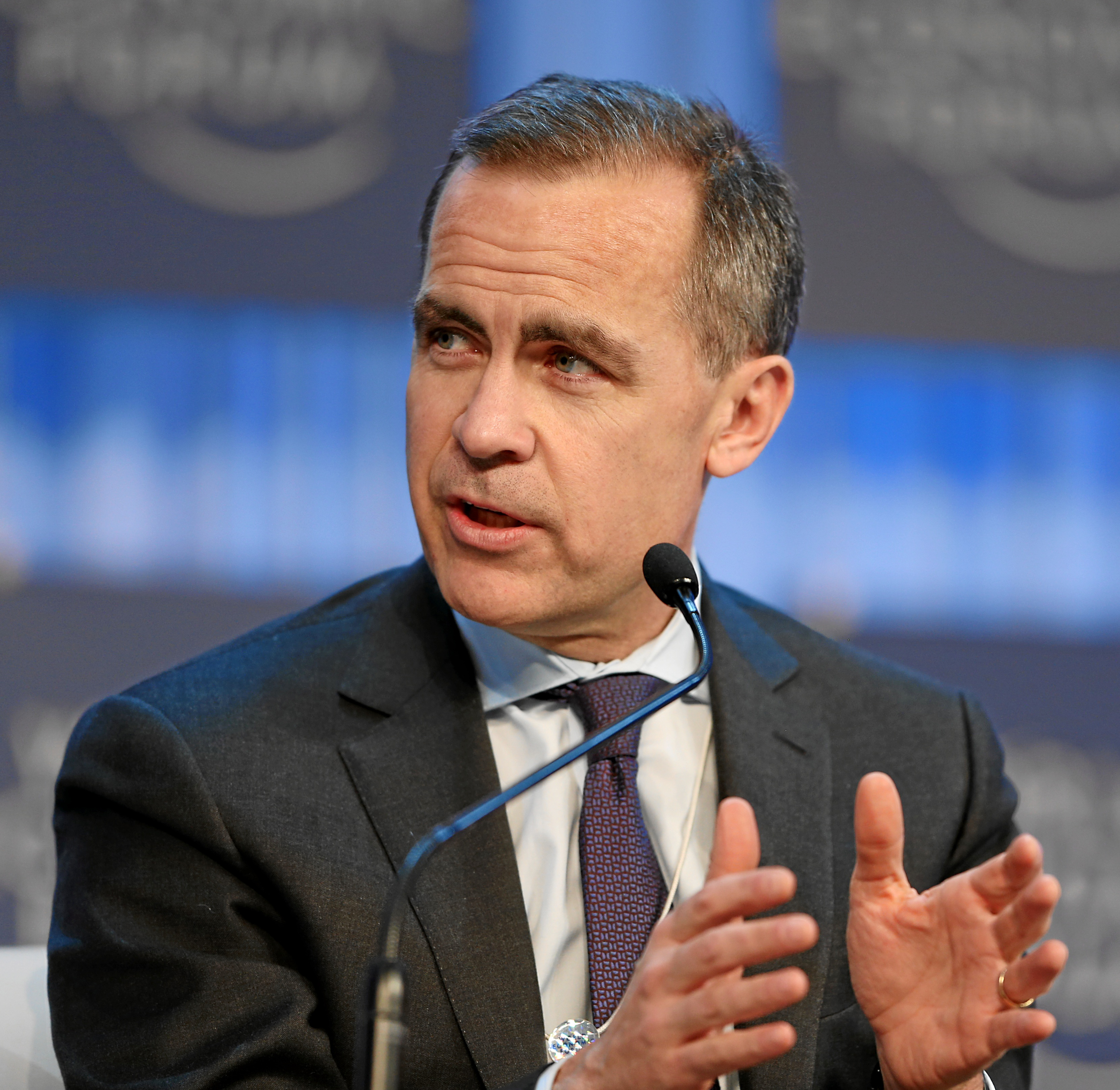
Carney speaks on the global economic outlook at the 2013 World Economic Forum panel.

Carney was a member of the Group of Thirty, an international body of leading financiers and academics, and of the Foundation Board of the World Economic Forum. Carney attended the annual meetings of the Bilderberg Group in 2011, 2012 and 2019.

On November 4, 2011, Carney was named chairman of the Basel-based Financial Stability Board, which coordinates international financial regulatory authorities. In a statement, Carney credited his appointment to "the strong reputation of Canada's financial system and the leading role that Canada has played in helping to develop many of the most important international reforms".

The three-year term was a part-time commitment, allowing Carney to complete his term at the Bank of Canada. While there had been no indication of his priorities as chairman, on the day of his appointment the Board published a list of 29 banks that were considered large enough to pose a risk to the global economy should they fail. At his first press conference as Chairman of the FSB in January 2012, Carney laid out his key priorities for the board. In November 2014, Carney was reappointed to a second term as chairman. This second term ended in 2018, while he was in his next post at the Bank of England.

=== Governor of the Bank of England (2013–2020) ===
On November 26, 2012, Chancellor of the Exchequer George Osborne announced the appointment of Carney as Governor of the Bank of England. He succeeded Sir Mervyn King on July 1, 2013. He was the first Commonwealth citizen from outside Britain to be appointed to the role since the Bank of England was established in 1694. The Bank of England was given additional powers from 2013, such as the ability to set bank capital requirements. Although the usual term for governor is eight years, Carney indicated that he only intended to serve for five years and stand down in 2018.

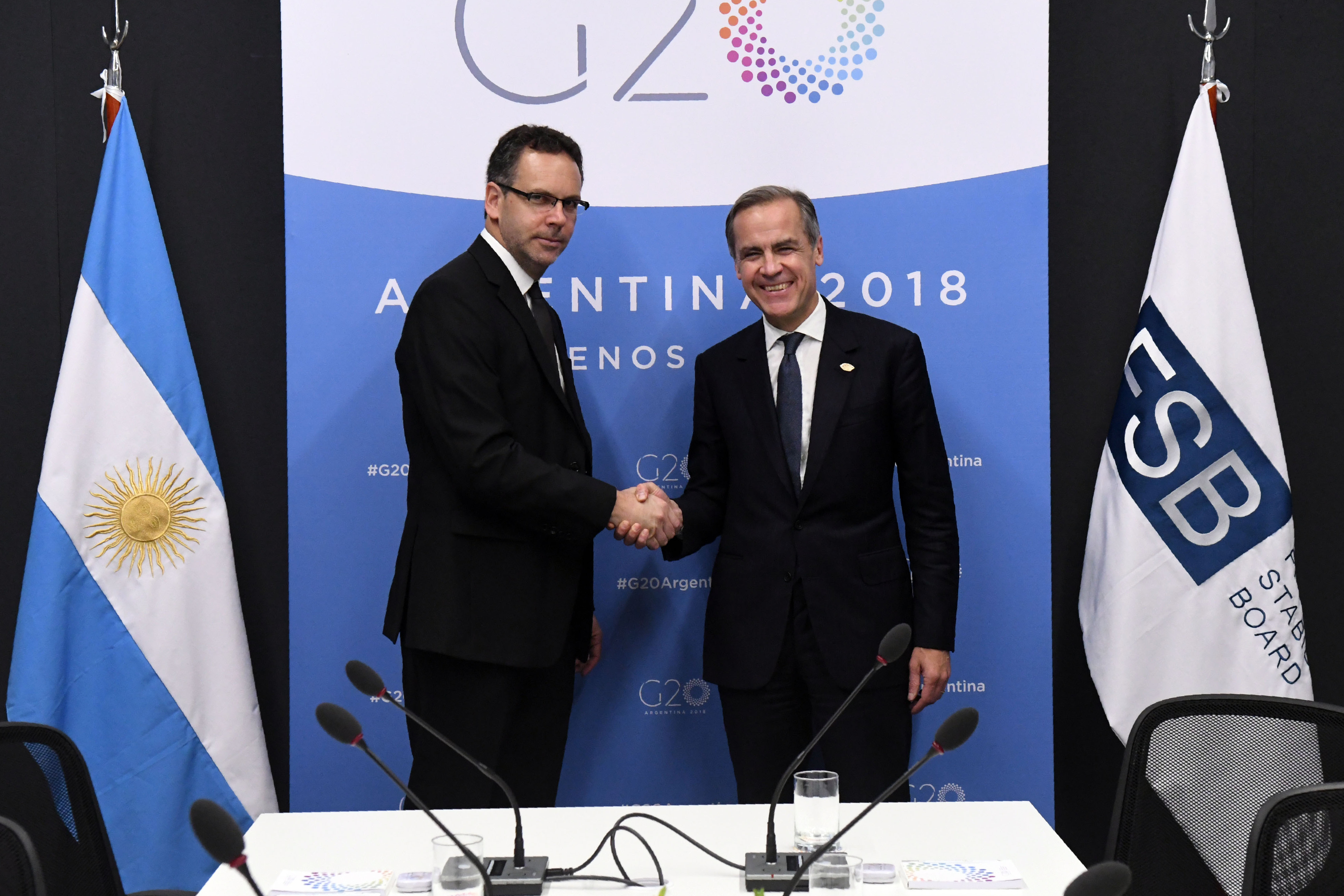
Carney, then governor of the Bank of England, attends a bilateral meeting with Guido Sandleris, the president of the Central Bank of Argentina.

Before taking up the post, Carney had already indicated disagreement with the Bank of England's Executive Director of Financial Stability Andy Haldane, specifically on leverage ratios and bank break-ups. He has been quoted as saying that Haldane does not have a "proper understanding of the facts" on bank regulation. He was thought to have been offered a total pay package of about £624,000 per year, approximately £100,000 more per year than his predecessor.

Shortly before Carney took up the post, the Bank of England took up financial regulation duties from the Financial Services Authority. Carney's changes to the Bank's operating procedures helped modernize the institution by making many more media appearances than predecessors, including controversial announcements during two referendums. Carney implemented a policy called "forward guidance" in which the Bank would not raise interest rates if unemployment was above 7% to try and encourage business lending. This policy, which contained many conditions, would later be considered confusing and complicated.

In May 2014, Carney warned the UK's heated housing market was the biggest risk to financial stability, and he was considering providing advice on the Help to Buy mortgage scheme, which some believed was contributing to housing inflation. He stated UK housing prices and the lack of housing affordability in the United Kingdom was due to limited supply, and that twice as many homes were built in Canada than in the UK, although Canada had half the population.

Carney stated foreign cash buyers in the London market were beyond his control but he believed they did not pose a significant risk to the rest of the country. Carney assured the public the Bank was monitoring rising property prices and large-value mortgages to avoid debt overhang destabilizing the economy.

In 2014, Carney warned that if the Scottish independence referendum was successful, the new country would likely not be able to continue using the pound sterling without ceding some powers to the UK.

In 2015, Carney changed the number of yearly interest rate meetings from twelve to eight and ordered minutes to be published during the announcements.

Before the 2016 Brexit referendum, Carney warned that leaving the European Union could cause a recession. After the resignation of Prime Minister David Cameron, he made another public announcement shortly after the result supporting a departure, in which he announced that the financial system would operate normally to assuage public concerns. Afterwards, the bank cut interest rates in half from 0.5% to 0.25% and restarted quantitative easing. At the urging of Prime Minister Theresa May and Chancellor of the Exchequer Philip Hammond, Carney agreed to extend his term while the UK undertook Brexit negotiations, but only for one year. He further agreed to an additional seven months in September 2018, to "support a smooth exit" from the EU, and to a further two months for an orderly transition to his successor, Andrew Bailey.

At the start of the COVID-19 pandemic in the United Kingdom, as Carney was set to leave the governorship in March 2020, the bank cut interest rates by 0.5% to protect against the pandemic's expected economic shocks.

=== Post-governorships (2020–2024) ===
In 2020, Carney served as one of many informal advisors to Canadian prime minister Justin Trudeau, advising him on the government's COVID-19 economic response. Carney reportedly advised Trudeau on Canada's response to the COVID-19 pandemic, with Trudeau looking to Carney to help Canada get out of its recession. Due to this, Carney was speculated to potentially become Minister of Finance, and later, Canadian prime minister if Trudeau resigned.

In October 2020, Carney was vice chairman at Brookfield Asset Management—a spin-off of Brookfield Corporation—where he led the firm's environmental, social and governance (ESG) and impact fund investment strategy. In February 2021, Carney retracted an earlier claim that the US$600 billion Brookfield Asset Management portfolio was carbon neutral. He had based his claim on the fact that Brookfield has a large renewable energy portfolio and "all the avoided emissions that come with that". The claim was criticized as accounting tricks because avoided emissions do not counteract the emissions from investments in coal and other fossil fuels responsible for Brookfield's carbon footprint of about 5,200 metric tons of carbon dioxide.

In 2020, Carney launched the Taskforce on Scaling Voluntary Carbon Markets—an initiative to increase trading of voluntary carbon offsets— with Bill Winters as Group Chief Executive. The TSVCM is sponsored by the Institute of International Finance. Taskforce members include more than "40 leaders from six continents with backgrounds across the carbon market value chain", including representatives from the Bank of America, BlackRock, Bloomberg's New Energy Finance, BNP Paribas, BP, Boeing, Goldman Sachs, Tata Steel, Total, IHS Markit, and LSE. In a December 3, 2020 Financial Times article, Carney said that the voluntary global carbon offset market was an "imperative" to help reduce emissions. The Times article cited Carney saying London would likely host the "new pilot market for voluntary carbon offsets" that could be "set up" by December 2021.

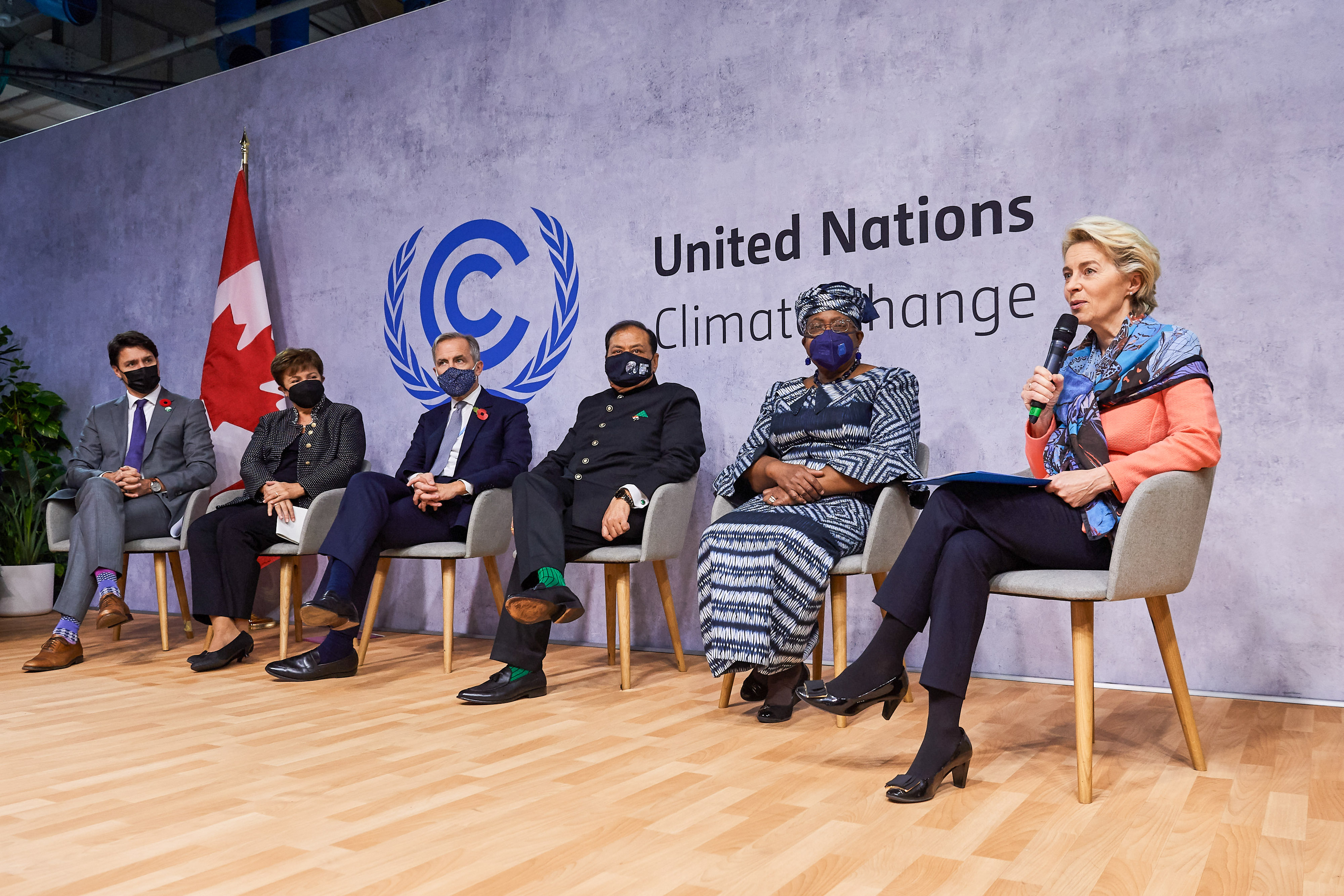
Carney on a panel at the COP26 alongside Canadian Prime Minister Justin Trudeau, managing director of the IMF Kristalina Georgieva, Director-General of the WTO Ngozi Okonjo-Iweala, and president of the European Commission Ursula von der Leyen

In February 2021, Carney joined the board of fintech company Stripe. Carney helped launch the Glasgow Financial Alliance for Net Zero (GFANZ) at COP26 in Glasgow in November 2021. He acts as the group's co-chair. From 2022 to January 2025, Carney was also an advisor to Watershed, a climate tech company founded by Stripe alumni that proposes to be "the platform companies need to succeed in the climate economy". In August 2023, Carney was named by Michael Bloomberg as chair of the new board of directors for Bloomberg L.P. as part of a broader reshuffle of the company's leadership.

In September 2024, Carney became a special adviser and chair of the Liberal task force on economic growth. Shortly after the appointment, it was revealed Brookfield Asset Management had solicited the federal government for CA$10 billion in funds as part of a $50 billion Canada-only asset fund. Carney did not need to follow standard ethical disclosures mandatory for prime ministerial advisors because he was employed by the Liberal Party rather than the Prime Minister's Office.

== Political beginnings ==
According to Carney, in 2012, Canadian Prime Minister Stephen Harper asked Carney—who was then governor of the Bank of Canada—if he would join the Conservative government as minister of finance. Carney declined, stating in a February 2025 interview with the CBC that he felt it "wasn't appropriate" for him to proceed with the offer because he felt it was not right to "go directly from being governor into elective politics."

Carney was approached by some officials in the Liberal Party to run for leader in their 2013 leadership election. He ultimately declined to do so.

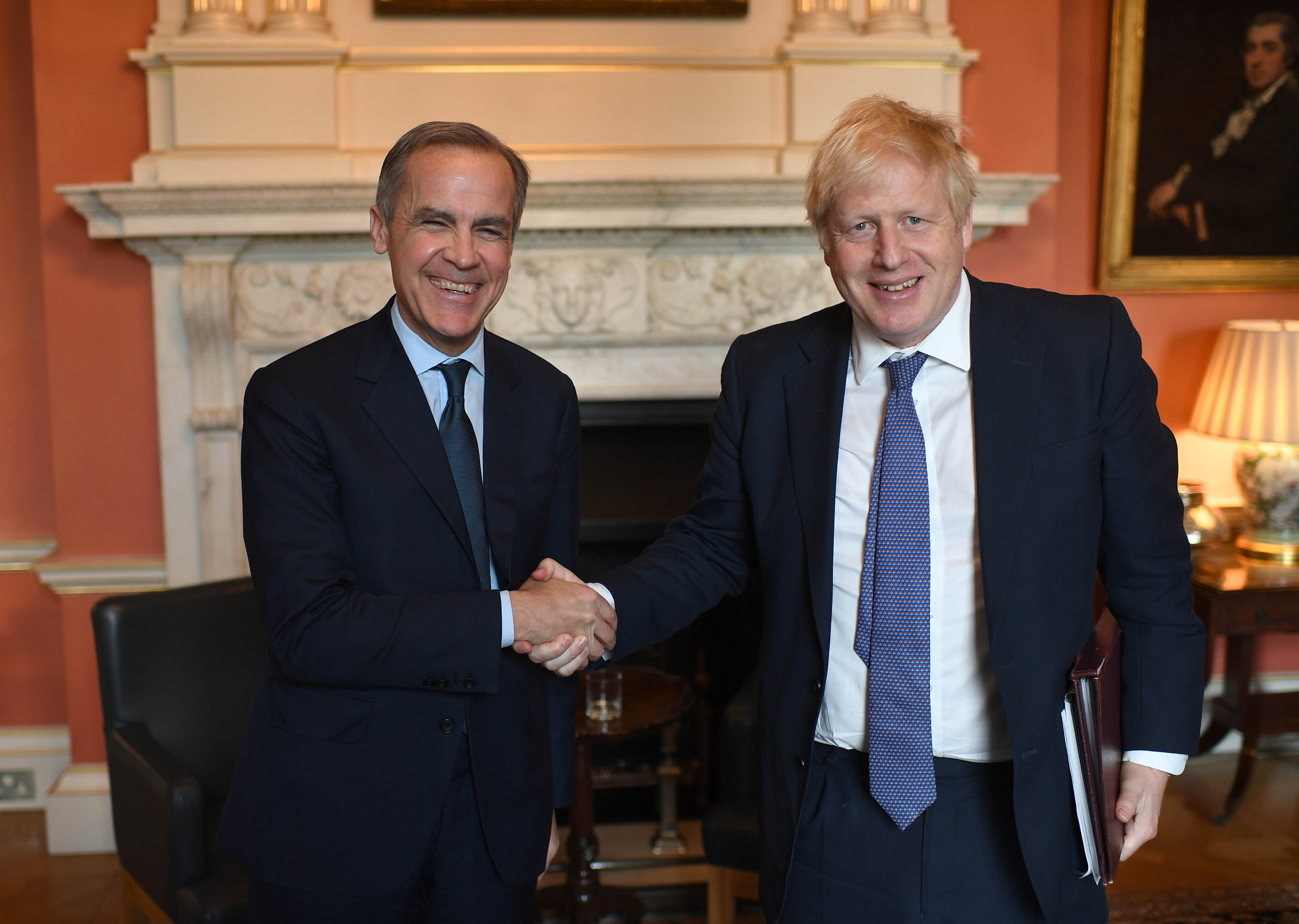
Carney meets with British Prime Minister Boris Johnson on January 16, 2020, to discuss COP26.

As he prepared to step down as governor of the Bank of England, Carney was appointed as United Nations special envoy for climate action and finance in March 2020. In January 2020, UK Prime Minister Boris Johnson appointed Carney to the position of finance advisor for the UK presidency of the COP26 United Nations Climate Change conference in Glasgow. At that time the conference was scheduled for November 2020, but it was later postponed to November 2021.

In 2021, Carney spoke at the Liberal Party policy convention, declaring his support of the party but stopping short of pledging to run under its banner. Later that year, he ruled himself out as a candidate in the then-speculated 2021 Canadian federal election, owing to his COP26 commitments.

Carney endorsed Catherine McKenney's candidacy for mayor of Ottawa in the 2022 mayoral election.

In October 2023, he endorsed the UK Labour Party's Shadow Chancellor Rachel Reeves to be the next chancellor of the exchequer in a video following Reeves' speech at the Labour Party conference that year. Following Labour's victory in the 2024 election, Carney was part of a taskforce which saw the creation of a British National Wealth Fund.

On September 9, 2024, Carney was named by Justin Trudeau to chair the Liberal Party of Canada's leader's Task Force on Economic Growth. His name was briefly mentioned upon the resignation of Chrystia Freeland as a possible candidate for finance minister in Trudeau's ministry.

=== Leader of the Liberal Party ===
==== 2025 leadership election ====
On January 16, 2025, Carney officially announced that he was running in the 2025 Liberal Party of Canada leadership election. Carney also announced that he stepped down from all executive, board and advisory positions that he held to focus on his leadership campaign. By February 9, his campaign had raised more than $1.9 million in donations from over 11,000 people and received endorsements from 66 Liberal caucus members. On March 9, Carney won on the first ballot with over 85.9% of the vote, making him the leader of the Liberal Party. His margin of victory surpassed Justin Trudeau's 2013 margin, winning all 343 electoral districts.

== Prime Minister of Canada (2025–present) ==
=== Swearing-in ===
On March 14, 2025, five days after winning the leadership election, Carney was sworn in as the 24th prime minister of Canada, along with the 30th Canadian Ministry. Upon taking the oath of office, he became the first Canadian prime minister born in any of its territories (as opposed to provinces) and the third born west of Ontario (after Joe Clark and Kim Campbell). He is the second prime minister to have earned a PhD, after William Lyon Mackenzie King. Additionally, he is the first to have never served in prior elected office, and the first since John Turner not to be sitting in the House of Commons at the time of appointment.

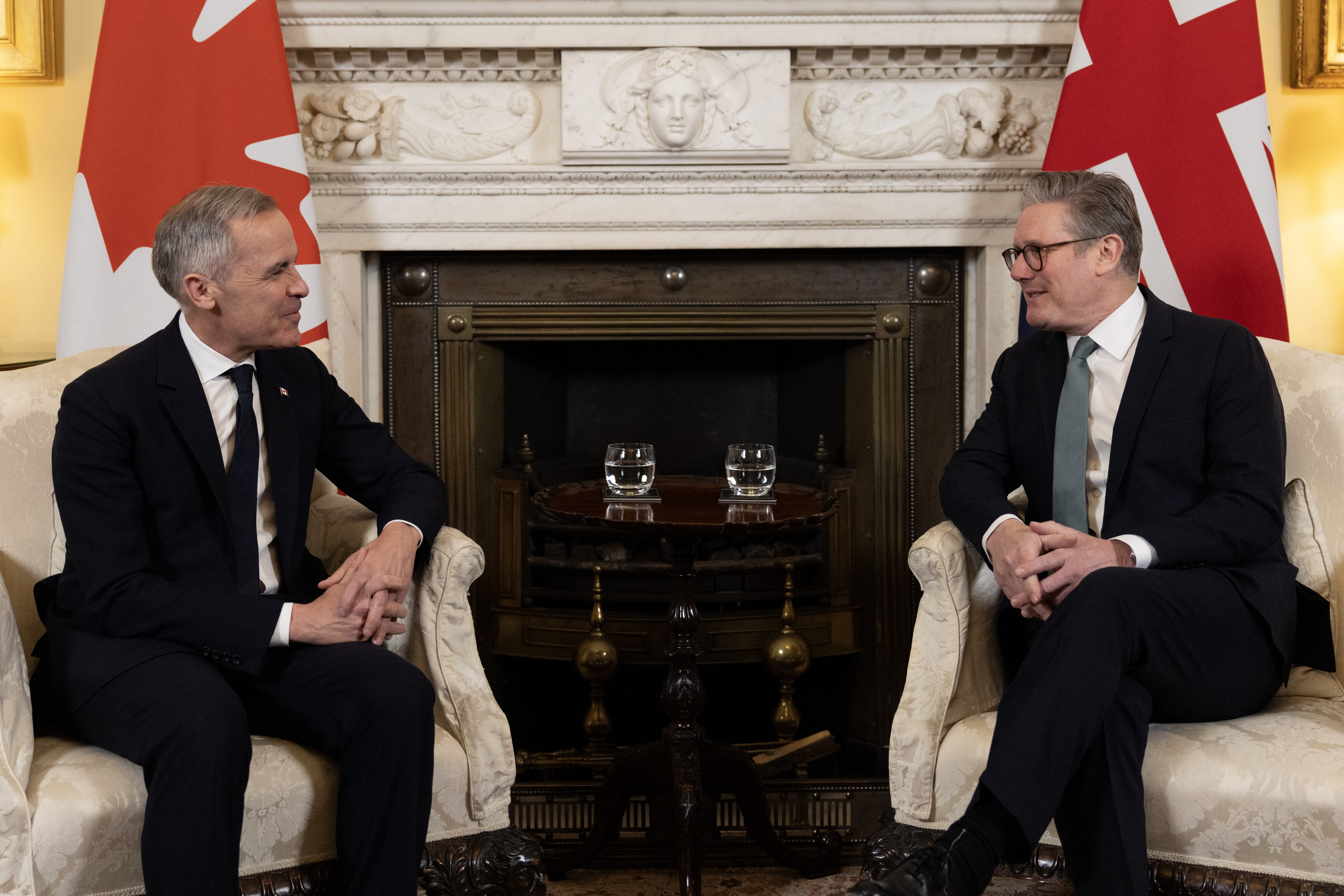
Carney meets with British Prime Minister Keir Starmer on March 17, 2025.

In his first act as prime minister, Carney signed a prime ministerial directive to end the consumer carbon tax by April 1, while ensuring that April's carbon rebate continues. The directive was affirmed by an order in council signed by Governor General Mary Simon. Carney's first foreign visits were to France and the United Kingdom on March 17 to strengthen mutual security and sovereignty. During the latter visit, Carney met with King Charles III for the first time as prime minister.

=== 2025 federal election ===
Carney was widely expected to call a federal parliamentary election for late April or early May 2025, ahead of the required election date in October. On March 22, the Liberal Party announced that Carney would contest the south Ottawa riding of Nepean in the election; ridings in Alberta had been floated given his personal connection to the province, particularly Edmonton, as were safe Liberal seats in Toronto and Ottawa. On March 23, Carney visited Governor General Mary Simon and asked to dissolve parliament and call an election for April 28. Carney and the Liberal Party subsequently won the election, winning 169 seats and falling 3 seats short of a majority. Carney also won the Nepean riding, making him the first prime minister since Wilfrid Laurier in 1908–1910 to represent a riding in the Ottawa area and the first since Lester B. Pearson to represent a riding in Ontario.

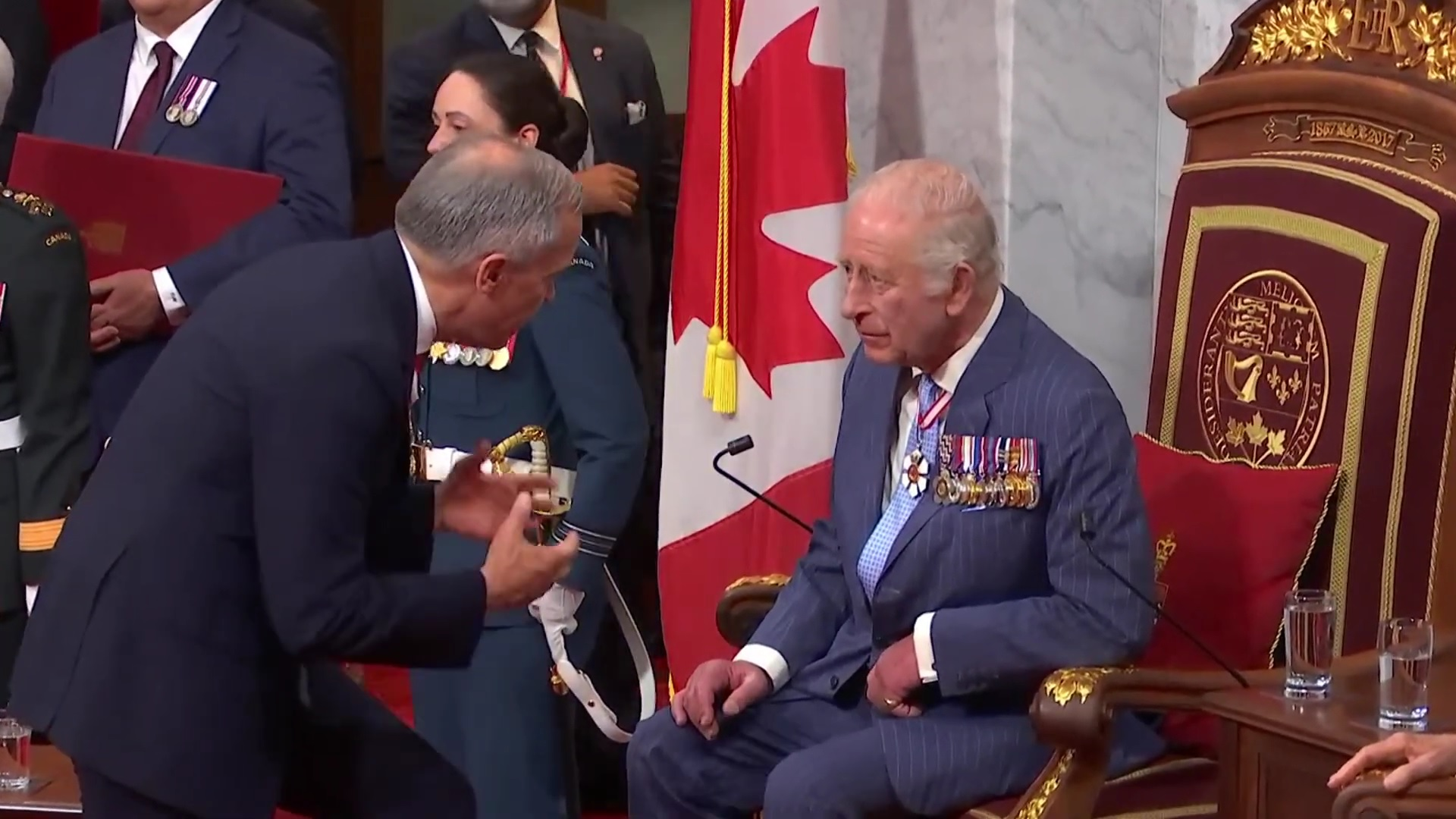
Carney and King Charles III in the Senate chamber during the 2025 Speech from the Throne

To open the 45th Canadian Parliament, Carney invited Charles III to deliver the Speech from the Throne, an act described as a symbolic affirmation of Canada's sovereignty. Among the items outlined in the speech was the government's intention to join ReArm Europe, a European-led defence initiative.

=== Domestic policy ===
Carney's government passed the first major legislation of his tenure, Bill C-5, the One Canadian Economy Act, in June 2025 with Conservative support. The bill removes federal barriers to internal trade and expedites nation-building projects with Cabinet approval; it received opposition from some Indigenous advocacy groups. His government presented the 2025 federal budget in November, promising to reduce the civil service by about 40,000 positions, cut new temporary resident admissions to 673,650 in 2025 to 385,000 in 2026, balance operational spending by 2029, and reach the 2% of GDP NATO target for military spending by 2026.

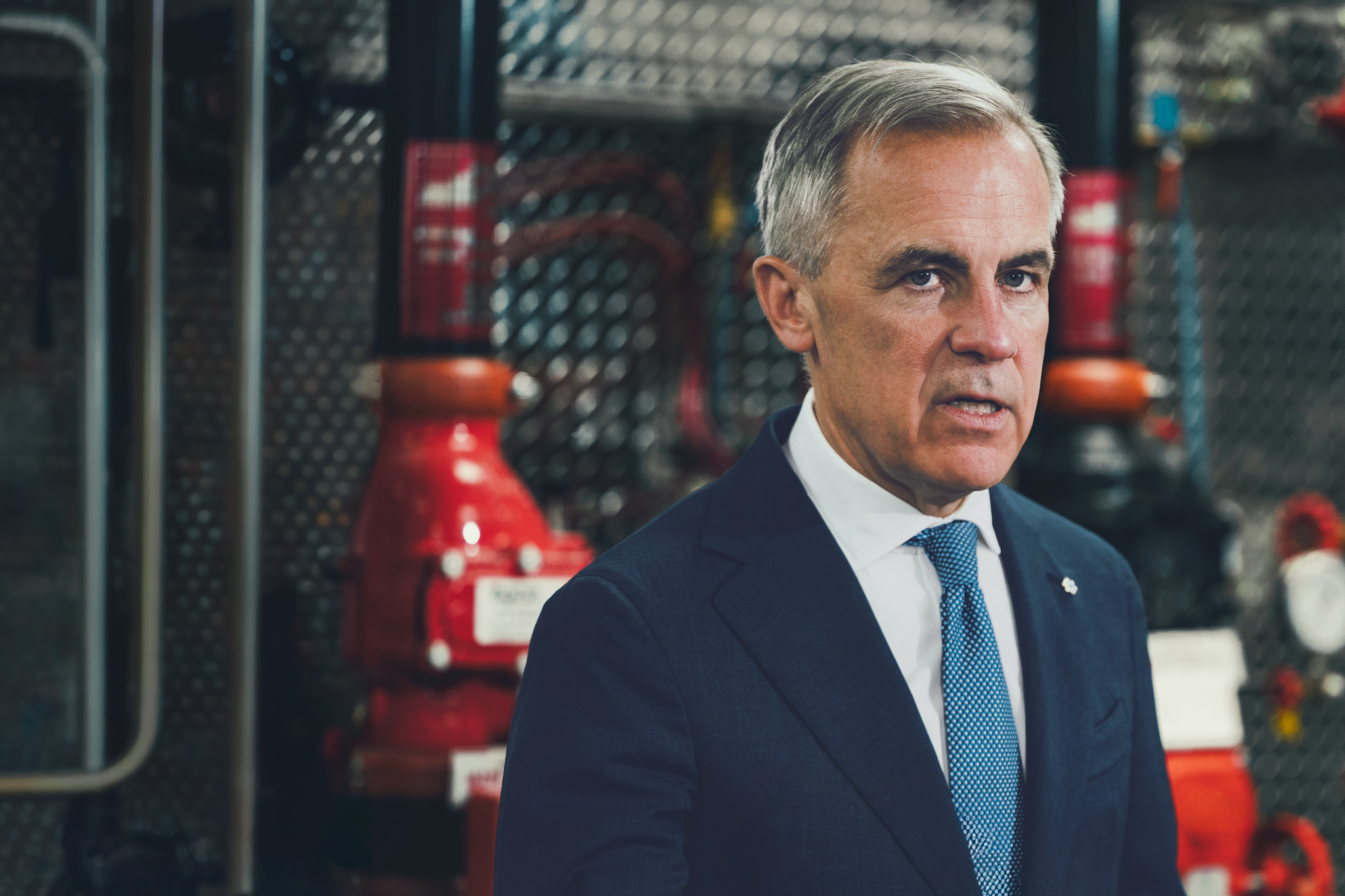
Carney in Calgary after the announcement of a Canada–Alberta energy agreement, May 2026

In addition, Carney reached a deal with Danielle Smith to build an oil pipeline from Alberta to the British Columbia Coast. Opposed by British Columbia's David Eby, most local First Nations, and some Liberal caucus members, the memorandum of understanding (MOU) exempts the project from climate legislation such as the greenhouse gas emissions cap, but outlines that Alberta will invest in a carbon capture system for the Athabasca oil sands. Following the signing of the MOU, Steven Guilbeault, former minister of environment and climate change, resigned from Cabinet while remaining a member of the government caucus.

Between late 2025 and early 2026, multiple opposition MPs crossed the floor to the Liberal caucus, which largely assisted the government in achieving majority status in April 2026. Carney was criticized for "undemocratically winning a majority", where floor-crossers "misrepresented themselves to their constituents".

=== Foreign policy ===
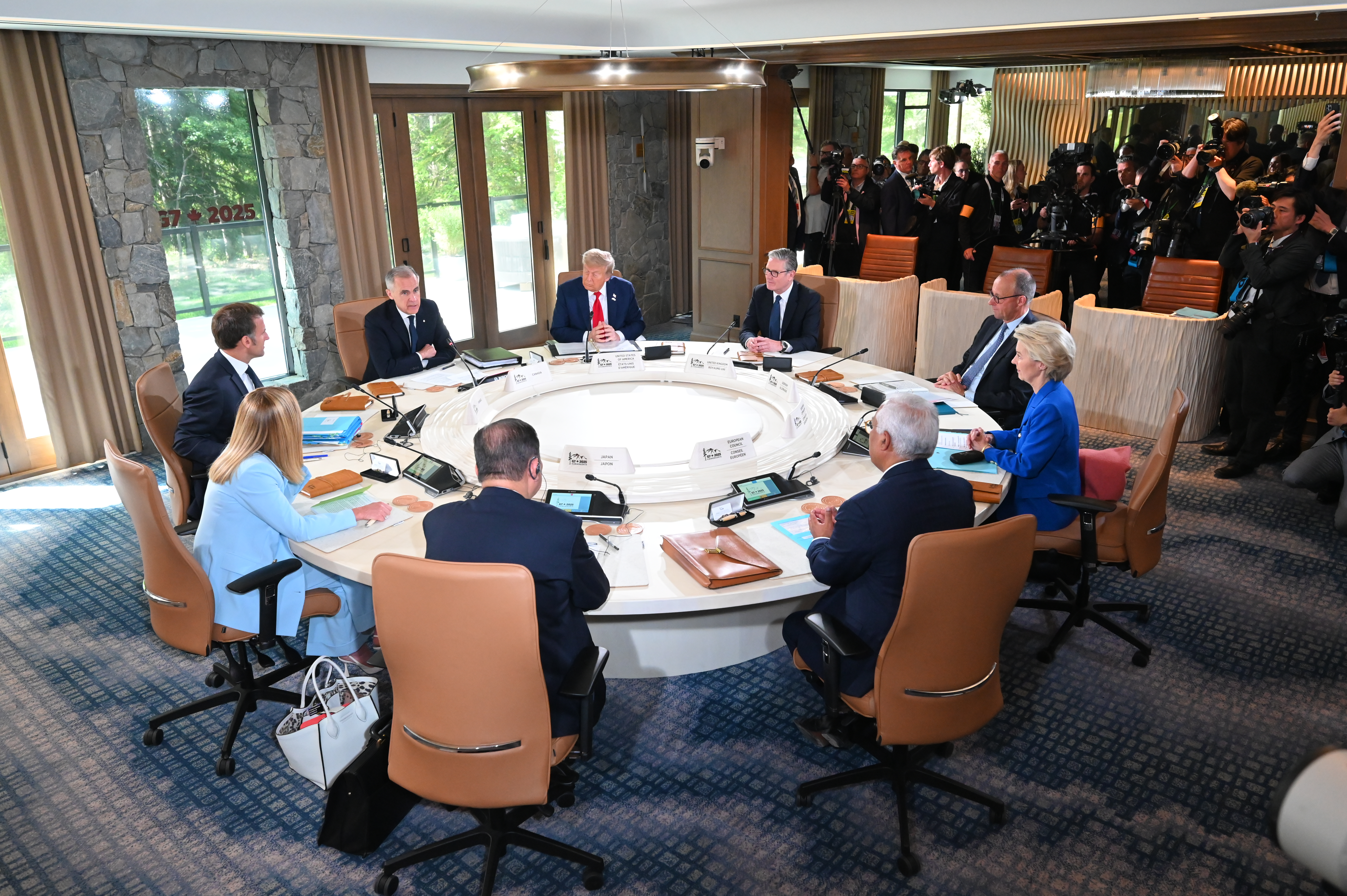
G7 leaders, including Carney, and the European Commission president during the 2025 G7 summit

In June 2025, Canada hosted the 51st G7 summit in Kananaskis, Alberta. In his capacity as chair, Carney opened the summit and invited other world leaders, including India's Narendra Modi and Ukraine's Volodymyr Zelenskyy.

In July 2025, Carney announced that at the next meeting of the UN General Assembly, Canada would officially recognize a Palestinian state. In September 2025, Carney and Indonesian President Prabowo Subianto signed the first bilateral free trade agreement between Canada and an ASEAN member state in Ottawa. In November 2025, Carney announced a $70 billion investment agreement with the United Arab Emirates (UAE) aimed at strengthening the Canadian economy. However, the deal has drawn criticism from human rights advocates due to concerns over the UAE's involvement in arming the Rapid Support Forces militia during the Sudanese civil war. Carney faced criticism after investigations linked Canadian-made weapons to atrocities in Sudan.

Carney's speech and subsequent discussion with Gideon Rachman at the 2026 World Economic Forum

In January 2026, he made an official visit to China and met with Chinese leader Xi Jinping. The two agreed to lower tariffs on Canadian canola oil from 85% to 15% and on Chinese electric vehicles from 100% to 6.1%. During his official visit to Beijing, Carney announced the formation of a "new strategic partnership" with China that is "realistic, respectful and interest-based". On January 20, 2026, Carney spoke at the World Economic Forum's annual meeting in Davos, where he declared that international economic partnerships were "in the midst of a rupture, not a transition", that the time of the rules-based global order was over, and that the middle powers must act together to avoid being victimized by American hegemony. Carney received a standing ovation for his speech, unusual for World Economic Forum meetings.

In October 2026, Carney stated that Canada is working towards becoming the European Union's first associate member.

== Views ==
Carney has been described as moderate, centrist, and technocratic; he is ideologically characterized as a member of the Blue Grits faction of the Liberal Party of Canada, being described as economically liberal and socially liberal. He defends a realpolitik approach in foreign policy, in contrast with the idealpolitik approach defended by the foreign policy of Justin Trudeau.

During the 2023 Global Progress Action Summit, Carney advocated for progressives to build "health care, infrastructure, schools, opportunity, sustainability and prosperity". Carney was noted for using "masters of our own house"—in French, maîtres chez nous—a phrase associated with the Quiet Revolution.

=== Economics ===
==== Wealth inequality ====
In 2011, Carney referred to the Occupy Wall Street protests as "entirely constructive", citing frustrations being felt "particularly in the United States" over inequality and increasing CEO–worker pay gaps. In December 2016, Carney warned of the societal risk of "staggering wealth inequalities" in a Roscoe Lecture at Liverpool John Moores University: "The proportion of the wealth held by the richest 1% of Americans increased from 25% in 1990 to 40% in 2012 ... Globally, the share of wealth held by the richest 1% in the world rose from one-third in 2000 to one-half in 2010."

==== Monetary policy ====
On August 23, 2019, Carney delivered a speech at the Federal Reserve Bank of Kansas City's 2019 annual Jackson Hole Economic Symposium entitled "The Growing Challenges for Monetary Policy in the current International Monetary and Financial System". Carney said that the "widespread use of the US dollar"—the dominant currency pricing—"in trade invoicing, in place of the currency of either the producer or the importer", has had a "destablilizing" effect on the global economy. About 50 per cent of international trade relies on the US dollar as the "currency of choice". This represents "five times greater than the US's share in world goods imports, and three times its share in world exports". Dominant currency pricing is not problematic when there is "synchronized growth" globally, Carney said. When "the tide is rising in America while receding elsewhere", the system needs to be revamped. Carney cited an article by Markus Brunnermeier, Harold James, and Jean-Pierre Landau on the potential role of digital currency area (DCA) in redefining the international monetary system.

Speaking just hours after US President Donald Trump posted a tweet blaming Federal Reserve chairman Jerome Powell's policies for creating fears of an economic recession and threatening China with more retaliatory tariffs, Carney urged central banks to collaborate in replacing the US dollar as reserve currency. He cautioned against choosing another new hegemonic reserve currency like the renminbi and suggested instead a "new Synthetic Hegemonic Currency" (SHC), such as Libra, which could potentially be provided "through a network of central bank digital currencies", that would decrease the US dollar's "domineering influence" on trade worldwide.

==== Moral to market sentiments ====
On December 2, 2020, Carney delivered the first of four Reith Lectures—the BBC's flagship annual series. In "How We Get What We Value – From Moral to Market Sentiments", he said society had come to esteem financial value over human value and moved from market economies to market societies. The series covers a trio of crises: credit, Covid, and climate.

==== Fiscal policy ====
After becoming prime minister, Carney reversed the Trudeau government's capital gains tax increase and promised to implement a middle-class tax cut and a new approach to federal budgeting that would save taxpayers money if appointed as prime minister.

==== Petroleum industry ====
In June 2025, after becoming prime minister, Carney voiced support for a new oil pipeline to the West Coast and a proposed $16.5-billion carbon capture system for the Athabasca oil sands. A memorandum of understanding with the Government of Alberta to advance a new pipeline and carbon capture system was reached in November 2025. The One Canadian Economy Act sped up approval of projects deemed of national interest, potentially including mines and oil pipelines, and eliminated some trade barriers between provinces.

In April 2026, Carney's government temporarily suspended the federal excise tax on gasoline and diesel, reducing the tax by 10¢/L on gasoline and 4¢/L on diesel. The suspension was subsequently extended beyond its original September 2026 expiry date.

=== Foreign affairs ===
==== Brexit ====
Carney warned many times that Brexit was expected to negatively influence the UK economy. Consequently, Brexit activists accused him of making statements favouring the UK's continued membership of the European Union (EU) before the British EU-membership referendum. He replied that he felt it was his duty to speak up on such issues.

Carney, then governor of the Bank of England, speaking at the Policy Exchange in 2015

In November 2018, Carney warned that large parts of the British economy were not ready for a no-deal Brexit. Speaking on BBC Radio 4's Today program, Carney explained that fewer than half of businesses had initiated contingency plans.

In February 2019, speaking about the global economy, Carney provided a less negative perspective on Brexit, stating that globalization has resulted in "imbalances of democracy and sovereignty", and that Brexit "is the first test of a new global order and could prove the acid test of whether a way can be found to broaden the benefits of openness while enhancing democratic accountability".

Carney also said that the increase in the perception that a no-deal Brexit is likely is "evidenced by betting odds and financial market asset pricing", resulting in the UK now having "the highest FX (foreign exchange) implied volatility, the highest equity risk premium and lowest real yields of any advanced economy."

==== China ====
Carney at APEC South Korea 2025. During the summit, he held a sidelines meeting with Chinese leader Xi Jinping

On June 9, 2025, in his speech on defence spending, Carney warned of new threats to Canada's security and sovereignty, including those coming from an "assertive China." However, relations improved after Carney became Prime Minister, particularly after he held a meeting with Chinese leader Xi Jinping in October 2025 at the sidelines of the APEC summit in South Korea; both countries termed the meeting as a "turning point". The improvement in the relationship happened shortly after the deterioration of Canada's relationship with the United States under President Trump.

Carney visited China for three days in mid-January 2026, securing a preliminary agreement-in-principle. Canada intends to lower tariffs on Chinese EVs from 100% to 6.1%, and China is expected to lower tariffs on Canadian canola oil and other goods. Carney stated, “I believe the progress we have made, and the partnership, sets us up well for the new world order.” When asked about human rights in China, Carney responded, “We take the world as it is, not as we wish it to be.”

In November 2026, Carney visited Shenzhen to attend APEC China 2026. During the visit, he met with Xi, where he praised "greater predictability and stability" in the relationship and announced Canada was well ahead of schedule in its goal of boosting exports to China "by 50% by the end of this decade". The two countries announced China would provide an additional C$400 million (US$280 million) tariff relief for Canadian exports, including products such as frozen pork cuts and fish and seafood, while Canada would extend by two years existing remission measures for certain Chinese steel and aluminum products that were set to expire by the end of 2026.

==== Gaza war ====
In April 2025, Carney disagreed with the accusation that Israel was committing genocide in Gaza, but supported an arms embargo on Israel. In June 2025, he compared the Israeli invasion of the Gaza Strip and occupation of the West Bank to the Russian invasion of Ukraine. In September 2025, he announced Canada's formal recognition of the State of Palestine, becoming the first G7 nation to do so.

In October 2025, Carney confirmed that Canada would fulfill its commitments to the International Criminal Court (ICC) and stated that, should Israeli Prime Minister Benjamin Netanyahu enter Canadian territory, he would be detained.

==== Iran–Israel conflict ====
Following the Israeli attacks on Iran in June 2025, Carney reaffirmed "Israel's right to defend itself" and called for restraint. Carney supported the 2026 Israeli–United States strikes on Iran while stressing that Canada was not party to the operation.

==== NATO ====
Carney arriving at the 2025 The Hague NATO summit

In February 2025, Carney committed that the Canadian government would spend 2% of Canada's GDP on defence (the NATO target) by the end of 2030. In June 2025, Carney committed that the government would reach the 2% target by March 2026 and NATO's new 5% of GDP target by 2035.

==== Trade ====
Carney meets with US President Donald Trump, May 2025

During the 2025 Liberal leadership election, and in light of aggressive actions taken by the United States under the second Trump administration, Carney said that he supported deepening relationships with fellow Commonwealth member states the United Kingdom, Australia, and New Zealand.

In August 2026, the Trump administration imposed a 50% tariff on certain Canadian goods worth roughly US$20 billion following a collapse in trade talks between the two nations. Canada had suspended negotiations because of "last-minute changes" the Americans had made to the deal that "were unfair, uneconomic, and called into question the reliability of any deal." In response, Canada would impose retaliatory "dollar for dollar" tariffs in September, along with announcing support packages for impacted industries.

=== Environmentalism ===
Carney in 2020 discussing a net zero economy

Carney has often advocated for environmental sustainability. He was appointed as a United Nations Special Envoy on Climate Change in 2019. In March 2021, Carney stated that in Canada there is a "huge economic opportunity" in the transition to a sustainable economy with reduced carbon emissions. He says that it is time to listen to scientists that have long been warning about the risks posed by climate change. Carney had initially supported the consumer carbon tax as implemented in 2019, but stated in a May 2024 Senate committee hearing that the tax had "served a purpose up until now." In 2020, he called the green transition "the greatest commercial opportunity of our time".

In a January 2025 interview with Jon Stewart, Carney attributed much of Canada's emissions to the oil industry, which he argued must become cleaner rather than ordinary Canadians changing their lifestyles. During his Liberal leadership campaign, Carney proposed replacing the existing consumer carbon tax with an incentive program to reward green choices, while keeping tax on large industrial emitters. He also promised to introduce a "carbon border-adjustment" to penalize high-polluting foreign imports. Carney supported the Trudeau government's EV mandate, requiring hybrids and electric vehicles to make up 20% of sales by 2026 and 100% by 2035.

In government, Carney eliminated the federal carbon tax, suspended the federal fossil fuels emissions cap, and reached a Memorandum of Understanding with Alberta that did not rule out a new oil pipeline to the west coast, despite the objections of British Columbia and Indigenous leaders, leading to criticism from environmentalists (see § 45th Parliament). Though Green Party leader Elizabeth May supported the November Budget, she later admitted, in the wake of the Alberta MOU that it was a mistake. May called it a "significant betrayal and a reversal" and doubted the Prime Minister's faithfulness to his word. In December 2025, Carney criticized the Trudeau government's approach to environmental protection as "too much regulation, not enough action".

=== Immigration ===
In 2025, Carney campaigned to address "unsustainable" immigration to Canada, which had risen to approximately 500,000 a year during Justin Trudeau's premiership. The Liberal Party pledged to reduce the number of permanent residents admitted to Canada to less than 1% of the Canadian population per year, or less than 410,000 by 2025. As per the Immigration Levels Plan 2025–2027, Canada's permanent resident admission targets are 395,000 in 2025, 380,000 in 2026, and 365,000 in 2027. The government set levels for temporary migrants in the 2025–2027 Levels Plan at 673,650 in 2025, 516,600 in 2026, and 543,600 in 2027.

In March 2025, Carney promised to reduce the number of temporary migrants and international students to less than 5% of the Canadian population by the end of 2027, saying "It's a sharp drop from the recent high of 7.3 per cent. This will help ease strains on housing, on public infrastructure and social services."

== Personal life ==
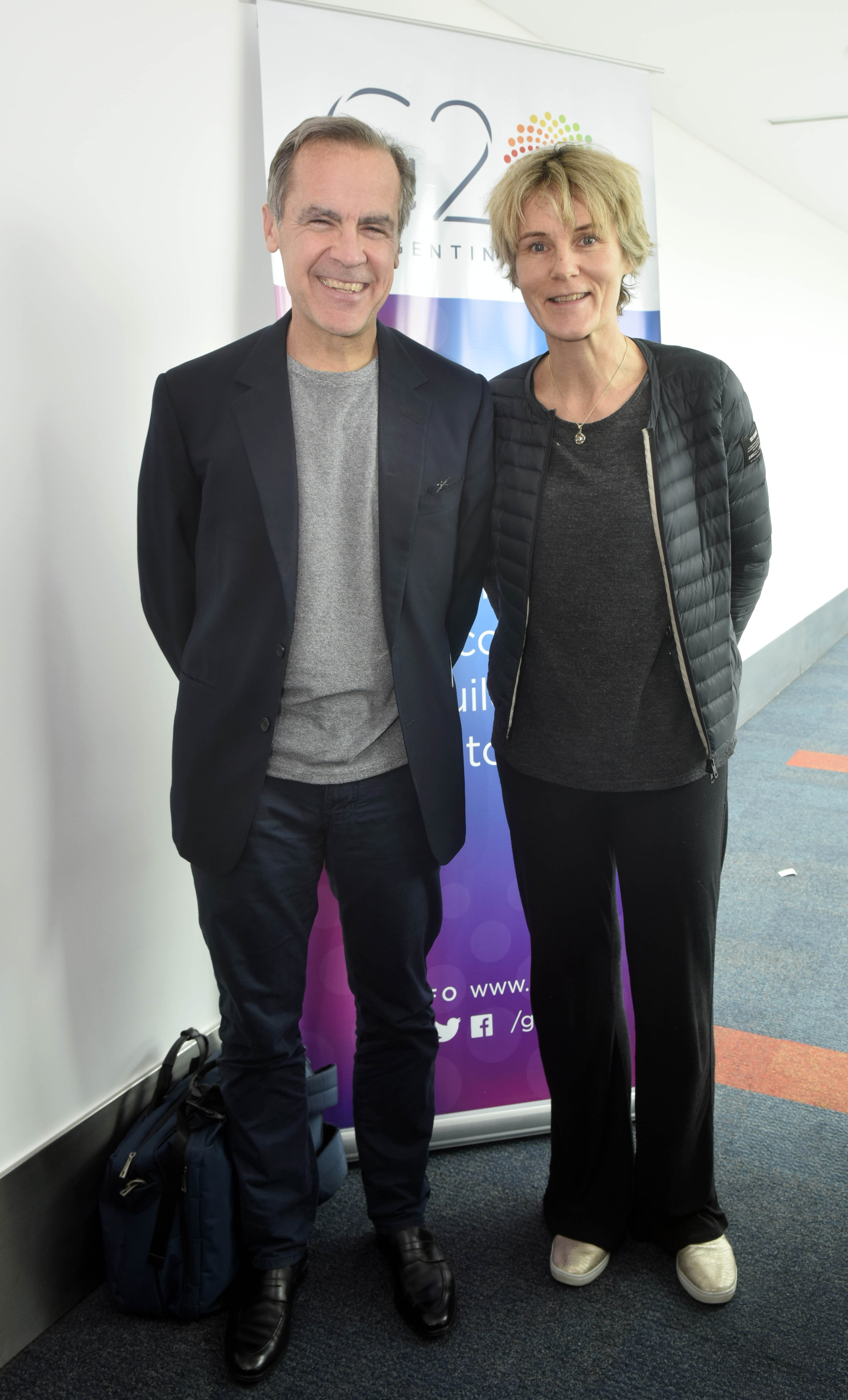
Carney and his wife Diana Fox Carney at the 2018 G20 Buenos Aires summit

Carney met British economist Diana Fox, who is also active in various environmental and social justice causes, while studying at the University of Oxford. They were married in July 1994 while he was finishing his doctoral thesis. They have four children; the couple lived in Toronto before moving to the Rockcliffe Park neighbourhood of Ottawa and then moving to London in 2013. They moved back to Ottawa when Carney left his role at the Bank of England in 2020. He is godfather to the son of fellow politician Chrystia Freeland, who ran against him in the 2025 Liberal Party leadership election.

Carney is a Catholic, and was named the most influential Catholic in Britain by The Tablet in 2015. He speaks French but has described his proficiency as "far from perfect". He was a triple citizen of Canada, Ireland and the United Kingdom, having obtained Irish citizenship in the late 1980s, and British citizenship in 2018 – the latter while governor of the Bank of England, fulfilling a commitment he made when accepting the role. Shortly before becoming Canadian Prime Minister in March 2025, he said that he had started the process of formally renouncing his British and Irish citizenship to signify his commitment to Canada. In April 2025, his campaign stated that he had renounced the other citizenships prior to being sworn in as prime minister.

Carney has distant relatives in Liverpool and is a supporter of the city's soccer team Everton FC, though his wife supports Arsenal FC. He is also a supporter of ice hockey team Edmonton Oilers and football team Edmonton Elks. He completed the 2015 London Marathon in 3 hours, 31 minutes, and 22 seconds, marking a 17-minute improvement on his time at the 2011 Ottawa Marathon.

== Published works ==
The title of Carney's DPhil thesis is The Dynamic Advantage of Competition.

Carney's first book, Value(s): Building a Better World for All, was published by Signal Books in 2021. His second book, The Hinge: Time to Build an Even Better Canada, was indefinitely delayed from its scheduled publishing date of May 13, 2025.

== Honours and distinctions ==
- Officer of the Order of Canada (OC) on November 20, 2014.
- Queen Elizabeth II Diamond Jubilee Medal in 2012.
- Freeman of the City of London.
- Honorary degree of Doctor of Laws (LL.D) from the University of Manitoba on April 5, 2013.
- Honorary degree of Doctor of Laws (LL.D) from the University of Alberta in Spring 2016.
- Honorary degree of Doctor of Laws (LL.D) from the University of Toronto on June 18, 2018.
- Honorary degree from the London Business School on July 16, 2019.
- National Business Book Award (2021)
- First Canadian to receive the Democracy Medal (2026)

== See also ==
- List of current heads of state and government
- List of heads of the executive by approval rating

Government offices
Preceded by David Dodge	Governor of the Bank of Canada; 2008–2013	Succeeded by Stephen S. Poloz
Preceded by Mervyn King	Governor of the Bank of England; 2013–2020	Succeeded by Andrew Bailey
Diplomatic posts
Preceded by Mario Draghi	Chair of the Financial Stability Board; 2011–2018	Succeeded by Randal Quarles
Preceded by Giorgia Meloni	Chair of the Group of Seven; 2025	Succeeded by Emmanuel Macron
Parliament of Canada
Preceded by Chandra Arya	Member of Parliament for Nepean; 2025–present	Incumbent
Party political offices
Preceded by Justin Trudeau	Leader of the Liberal Party; 2025–present	Incumbent
Political offices
Preceded by Justin Trudeau	Prime Minister of Canada; 2025–present	Incumbent
Order of precedence
Preceded by Members of the Royal Family (other than the King); When in Canada	Order of Precedence of Canada as Prime Minister	Succeeded by Richard Wagner as Chief Justice
Preceded by Mary Simon as Governor General	Order of Precedence of Canada as Prime Minister	Succeeded by Richard Wagner as Chief Justice
