= Edmonton Strathcona =

Federal electoral district in Alberta, Canada

Coordinates: 53.52°N 113.48°W

Alberta electoral district
- Interactive map of riding boundaries from the 2025 federal election

Federal electoral district
- Legislature: House of Commons
MP
Heather McPherson
New Democratic
- District created: 1952
- First contested: 1953
- Last contested: 2025
- District webpage: profile, map

Demographics
- Population (2016): 106,066
- Electors (2019): 77,285
- Area (km²): 80
- Pop. density (per km²): 1,325.8
- Census division: Division No. 11
- Census subdivision: Edmonton (part)

Edmonton Strathcona (formerly known as Edmonton—Strathcona) is a federal electoral district in Alberta, Canada, that has been represented in the House of Commons of Canada since 1953. It spans the south-central part of the city of Edmonton. In the periods from 2008 to 2015 and 2019 to 2021, during the 40th, 41st, and 43rd Canadian Parliaments, Edmonton Strathcona was the only federal riding in Alberta not represented by the Conservative Party.

== Geography ==
Edmonton Strathcona encompasses the neighbourhoods of Allendale, Argyll, Avonmore, Belgravia, Bonnie Doon, Capilano, Cloverdale, Empire Park, Forest Heights, Fulton Place, Garneau, Gold Bar, Grandview Heights, Hazeldean, Holyrood, Idylwylde, Kenilworth, King Edward Park, Lansdowne, Lendrum Place, Malmo Plains, McKernan, Ottewell, Parkallen, Pleasantview, Queen Alexandra Park, Ritchie, Riverdale, Strathcona, Strathearn, Terrace Heights, and Windsor Park.

The riding contains the historic district of Old Strathcona, the University of Alberta, the University of Alberta Campus Saint-Jean and the Mackenzie Health Sciences Centre.

It borders on the federal ridings of Edmonton Centre, Edmonton Griesbach, Sherwood Park—Fort Saskatchewan, Edmonton Southeast, Edmonton Gateway and Edmonton Riverbend.

This district is bounded:

- On the north by the North Saskatchewan River (except for a jog that goes around the neighbourhood of Riverdale, which is north of the river).
- On the west by the Whitemud Creek from the North Saskatchewan River to Whitemud Drive.
- On the south by Whitemud Drive, from Whitemud Creek to the City Limits.
- On the east by Edmonton's City Limits.

=== Political geography ===
As evidenced by the 2008 and 2011 elections, this riding is heavily polarized between more urban New Democratic Party (NDP) voters concentrated in the northwest of the riding and suburban Conservative voters concentrated in the south and east.

The NDP picked up this seat in 2008 for the first time in its history, when Edmonton lawyer Linda Duncan defeated Tory incumbent Rahim Jaffer, thanks to a consolidation of non-Conservative votes. They have retained the riding since and it has established itself as clearly the most left-leaning riding in Alberta. Since the 2021 federal election, Edmonton-Strathcona has been the safest NDP seat in all of Canada.

== Demographics ==
According to the 2011 Canadian census; 2013 representation

Languages: 77.3% English, 3.8% French, 3.5% Chinese, 2.5% German, 1.5% Ukrainian, 1.3% Spanish, 1.3% Tagalog
Religions: 52.8% Christian (22.1% Catholic, 5.6% United Church, 3.5% Lutheran, 3.5% Anglican, 2.2% Baptist, 2.0% Christian Orthodox, 1.1% Pentecostal, 13.0% Other), 2.5% Muslim, 1.2% Hindu, 1.1% Buddhist, 40.6% No religion
Median income (2010): $35,026
Average income (2010): $46,710

Panethnic groups in Edmonton Strathcona (2011−2021)
Panethnic group	2021		2016		2011	
Panethnic group	Pop.	%	Pop.	%	Pop.	%
European (Note: Statistic includes all persons that did not make up part of a visible minority or an indigenous identity.)	71,690	71.24%	75,835	73.84%	79,705	79.24%
East Asian (Note: Statistic includes total responses of "Chinese", "Korean", and "Japanese" under visible minority section on census.)	6,895	6.85%	7,240	7.05%	5,565	5.53%
Indigenous	6,305	6.27%	5,405	5.26%	4,320	4.29%
South Asian	4,855	4.82%	4,150	4.04%	2,825	2.81%
Southeast Asian (Note: Statistic includes total responses of "Filipino" and "Southeast Asian" under visible minority section on census.)	3,615	3.59%	3,655	3.56%	2,925	2.91%
African	2,410	2.39%	2,335	2.27%	1,505	1.5%
Middle Eastern (Note: Statistic includes total responses of "West Asian" and "Arab" under visible minority section on census.)	2,180	2.17%	1,955	1.9%	1,840	1.83%
Latin American	1,500	1.49%	1,385	1.35%	1,185	1.18%
Other/Multiracial (Note: Statistic includes total responses of "Visible minority, n.i.e." and "Multiple visible minorities" under visible minority section on census.)	1,190	1.18%	735	0.72%	730	0.73%
Total responses	100,635	98.48%	102,695	96.82%	100,585	97.48%
Total population	102,188	100%	106,066	100%	103,183	100%
Notes: Totals greater than 100% due to multiple origin responses. Demographics based on 2012 Canadian federal electoral redistribution riding boundaries.

== History ==
The Strathcona riding dates back to Territorial times (see Strathcona (federal electoral district). It was represented by Liberal MPs, then a Liberal MP who after election became a Unionist, then became a Conservative), and a United Farmer of Alberta MP in that early incarnation. (This riding was abolished in 1924, and its area was split among the Edmonton East, Edmonton West and Vegreville ridings.)

The electoral district of Edmonton—Strathcona (later Edmonton Strathcona) was created in 1952 from Edmonton East and Edmonton West ridings.

Edmonton—Strathcona gained territory from Edmonton East and was renamed "Edmonton Strathcona" during the 2012 electoral redistribution.

=== Historical boundaries ===
1952 representation order

1966 representation order

1976 representation order

1987 representation order

1996 representation order

2003 representation order

2013 representation order

=== Members of Parliament ===
This riding has elected the following members of the House of Commons:

Parliament	Years	Member	Party
Edmonton—Strathcona; Riding created from Edmonton East and Edmonton West
22nd	1953–1957	Richmond Francis Hanna	Liberal
23rd	1957–1958	Sydney Herbert Thompson	Social Credit
24th	1958–1962	Terry Nugent	Progressive Conservative
25th	1962–1963	Terry Nugent	Progressive Conservative
26th	1963–1965	Terry Nugent	Progressive Conservative
27th	1965–1968	Terry Nugent	Progressive Conservative
28th	1968–1972	Hu Harries	Liberal
29th	1972–1974	Douglas Roche	Progressive Conservative
30th	1974–1979	Douglas Roche	Progressive Conservative
31st	1979–1980	David Kilgour	Progressive Conservative
32nd	1980–1984	David Kilgour	Progressive Conservative
33rd	1984–1988	David Kilgour	Progressive Conservative
34th	1988–1993	Scott Thorkelson	Progressive Conservative
35th	1993–1997	Hugh Hanrahan	Reform
36th	1997–2000 (Note: The Reform Party merged with the Canadian Alliance on 27 March 2000.)	Rahim Jaffer	Reform
36th	2000–2000	Rahim Jaffer	Alliance
37th	2000–2003 (Note: The Canadian Alliance merged with the Progressive Conservatives to form the Conservative Party on 8 December 2003.)	Rahim Jaffer	Alliance
37th	2003–2004	Rahim Jaffer	Conservative
38th	2004–2006	Rahim Jaffer	Conservative
39th	2006–2008	Rahim Jaffer	Conservative
40th	2008–2011	Linda Duncan	New Democratic
41st	2011–2015	Linda Duncan	New Democratic
Edmonton Strathcona
42nd	2015–2019	Linda Duncan	New Democratic
43rd	2019–2021	Heather McPherson	New Democratic
44th	2021–2025	Heather McPherson	New Democratic
45th	2025–present	Heather McPherson	New Democratic

=== Current member of Parliament ===
The current member of Parliament is Heather McPherson of the New Democratic Party who was first elected in the 2019 federal election and re-elected in the 2021 federal election. Winning 61% of the district vote in 2021, McPherson holds the largest margin of victory among elected NDP MPs in the 44th parliament.

== Election results ==
Graph of election results in Edmonton—Strathcona, Edmonton Strathcona (minor parties that never got 2% of the vote or didn't run consistently are omitted) View source data.

=== Edmonton Strathcona (2013–present) ===
Graph of election results in Edmonton Strathcona (minor parties that never got 2% of the vote or didn't run consistently are omitted) View source data.

2025 Canadian federal election
Party	Candidate	Votes	%	±%	Expenditures
New Democratic	Heather McPherson	28,027	46.96	–10.99	$113,792.42
Conservative	Miles Berry	19,768	33.12	+6.35	$47,957.55
Liberal	Ron Thiering	10,709	17.94	+8.92	$55,867.76
People's	David Joel Wojtowicz	386	0.65	–3.87	$1,213.42
Green	Atul Deshmukh	366	0.61	–0.64	none listed
Independent	Graham Lettner	250	0.42	–	$5,125.91
Communist	Christian Bourque	181	0.30	–	none listed
Total valid votes/expense limit		59,687	99.39	–	$128,865.02
Total rejected ballots		364	0.61	+0.01	
Turnout		60,051	72.00	+2.90	
Eligible voters		83,404			
New Democratic notional hold		Swing		–8.67	
Source: Elections Canada

2021 federal election redistributed results
Party	Vote	%
New Democratic	32,556	57.95
Conservative	15,040	26.77
Liberal	5,068	9.02
People's	2,539	4.52
Green	701	1.25
Others	273	0.49

2021 Canadian federal election
Party	Candidate	Votes	%	±%	Expenditures
New Democratic	Heather McPherson	31,690	60.68	+13.41	$84,100.08
Conservative	Tunde Obasan	13,310	25.49	–11.58	$95,386.46
Liberal	Hibo Mohamed	3,948	7.56	–4.06	$22,672.65
People's	Wes Janke	2,366	4.53	+2.87	$4,252.77
Green	Kelly Green	634	1.21	–0.82	none listed
Libertarian	Malcolm Stinson	275	0.53	–	none listed
Total valid votes/expense limit		52,223	99.40	–	$108,879.96
Total rejected ballots		317	0.60	+0.16	
Turnout		52,540	69.10	–3.16	
Eligible voters		76,037			
New Democratic hold		Swing		+12.50	
Source: Elections Canada

2019 Canadian federal election
Party	Candidate	Votes	%	±%	Expenditures
New Democratic	Heather McPherson	26,823	47.27	+3.31	$93,513.73
Conservative	Sam Lilly	21,035	37.07	+5.79	$88,211.43
Liberal	Eleanor Olszewski	6,592	11.62	–9.11	$90,837.85
Green	Michael Kalmanovitch	1,152	2.03	–0.27	$8,919.41
People's	Ian Cameron	941	1.66	–	$1,364.69
Communist	Naomi Rankin	125	0.22	–	$496.07
Marxist–Leninist	Dougal MacDonald	77	0.14	–0.03	none listed
Total valid votes/expense limit		56,745	99.56	–	$106,353.94
Total rejected ballots		250	0.44	+0.05	
Turnout		56,995	72.26	+1.27	
Eligible voters		78,876			
New Democratic hold		Swing		+4.55	
Source: Elections Canada

2015 Canadian federal election
Party	Candidate	Votes	%	±%	Expenditures
New Democratic	Linda Duncan	24,446	43.96	–9.75	$87,241.42
Conservative	Len Thom	17,395	31.28	–9.04	$36,812.49
Liberal	Eleanor Olszewski	11,524	20.73	+17.87	$62,711.39
Green	Jacob K. Binnema	1,278	2.30	–0.04	$1,924.74
Libertarian	Malcolm Stinson	311	0.56	–	$1,599.80
Pirate	Ryan Bromsgrove	201	0.36	–	$1,083.76
Rhinoceros	Donovan Eckstrom	133	0.24	–	none listed
Independent	Chris Jones	116	0.21	–	none listed
Independent	Andrew Schurman	107	0.19	–	$455.26
Marxist–Leninist	Dougal MacDonald	93	0.17	–0.02	none listed
Total valid votes/expense limit		55,604	99.61	–	$208,715.39
Total rejected ballots		217	0.39	–	
Turnout		55,821	70.99	–	
Eligible voters		78,635			
New Democratic hold		Swing		–0.35	
Source: Elections Canada

2011 federal election redistributed results
Party	Vote	%
New Democratic	26,753	53.71
Conservative	20,084	40.32
Liberal	1,422	2.85
Green	1,165	2.34
Others	384	0.77

=== Edmonton—Strathcona (1952-2013) ===
Graph of election results in Edmonton—Strathcona (minor parties that never got 2% of the vote or didn't run consistently are omitted) View source data.

2011 Canadian federal election
Party	Candidate	Votes	%	±%	Expenditures
New Democratic	Linda Duncan	26,093	53.55	+10.96	$83,591.54
Conservative	Ryan Hastman	19,762	40.55	–1.05	$77,930.25
Liberal	Matthew Sinclair	1,372	2.82	–6.25	$16,742.47
Green	Andrew Fehr	1,119	2.30	–4.14	$217.58
Independent	Kyle Murphy	206	0.42	–	$1,915.44
Marxist–Leninist	Kevan Hunter	91	0.19	–0.12	none listed
Independent	Christopher White	87	0.18	–	$880.11
Total valid votes/expense limit		48,730	99.75	–	$84,504.87
Total rejected ballots		124	0.25	+0.04	
Turnout		48,854	66.52	+3.66	
Eligible voters		73,444			
New Democratic hold		Swing		+6.01	
Source: Elections Canada

2008 Canadian federal election
Party	Candidate	Votes	%	±%	Expenditures
New Democratic	Linda Duncan	20,103	42.58	+10.08	$70,896.93
Conservative	Rahim Jaffer	19,640	41.60	–0.11	$77,743.57
Liberal	Claudette Roy	4,279	9.06	–8.73	$71,903.46
Green	Jane Thrall	3,040	6.44	+0.49	$3,801.05
Marxist–Leninist	Kevan Hunter	147	0.31	+0.11	none listed
Total valid votes/expense limit		47,209	99.79	–	$82,491.89
Total rejected ballots		99	0.21	–0.07	
Turnout		47,308	62.86	–5.37	
Eligible voters		75,254			
New Democratic gain from Conservative		Swing		+5.09	
Source: Elections Canada

2006 Canadian federal election
Party	Candidate	Votes	%	±%	Expenditures
Conservative	Rahim Jaffer	22,009	41.71	+2.31	$73,018.07
New Democratic	Linda Duncan	17,153	32.51	+8.70	$54,446.98
Liberal	Andy Hladyshevsky	9,391	17.80	–11.22	$72,479.99
Green	Cameron Wakefield	3,139	5.95	–0.55	$1,326.47
Progressive Canadian	Michael Fedeyko	582	1.10	–	none listed
Marijuana	Dave Dowling	390	0.74	–0.33	none listed
Marxist–Leninist	Kevan Hunter	106	0.20	–0.01	$15.75
Total valid votes/expense limit		52,770	99.72	–	$77,836.93
Total rejected ballots		148	0.28	–0.03	
Turnout		52,918	68.23	+2.57	
Eligible voters		77,560			
Conservative hold		Swing		+5.50	
Source: Elections Canada

2004 Canadian federal election
Party	Candidate	Votes	%	±%	Expenditures
Conservative	Rahim Jaffer	19,089	39.40	–11.64	$65,390.20
Liberal	Debby Carlson	14,057	29.01	–2.88	$67,437.17
New Democratic	Minister Faust	11,535	23.81	+9.02	$44,181.99
Green	Cameron Wakefield	3,146	6.49	–	$2,855.80
Marijuana	Dave Dowling	519	1.07	–0.39	none listed
Marxist–Leninist	Kevan Hunter	103	0.21	–0.08	$26.75
Total valid votes/expense limit		48,449	99.69	–	$74,517.10
Total rejected ballots		150	0.31	–0.01	
Turnout		48,599	65.66	+2.87	
Eligible voters		74,014			
Conservative hold		Swing		+7.26	
Source: Elections Canada

2000 Canadian federal election
Party	Candidate	Votes	%	±%	Expenditures
Alliance	Rahim Jaffer	23,463	42.00	+0.70	$57,365
Liberal	Jonathan Dai	17,816	31.90	–3.49	$48,430
New Democratic	Hélène Lortie-Narayana	8,256	14.78	+0.25	$25,883
Progressive Conservative	Gregory Toogood	5,047	9.04	+1.79	$4,252
Marijuana	Ken Kirk	814	1.46	–	$149
Canadian Action	Kesa Rose Semenchuk	299	0.54	+0.35	$1,485
Marxist–Leninist	Kevan Hunter	164	0.29	–	$275
Total valid votes		55,859	99.68		
Total rejected ballots		182	0.32	+0.12	
Turnout		56,041	62.79	+0.05	
Eligible voters		89,248			
Alliance hold		Swing		+2.10	
Source: Elections Canada

1997 Canadian federal election
Party	Candidate	Votes	%	±%	Expenditures
Reform	Rahim Jaffer	20,605	41.30	+1.97	$58,003
Liberal	Ginette Rodger	17,654	35.39	–3.13	$58,244
New Democratic	Jean McBean	7,251	14.53	+9.48	$42,936
Progressive Conservative	Edo Nyland	3,614	7.24	–4.06	$10,183
Green	Karina Gregory	406	0.81	+0.24	$520
Natural Law	Maury Shapka	153	0.31	–0.27	none listed
Independent	Naomi Rankin	115	0.23	+0.05	$1,732
Canadian Action	J. Alex Ford	92	0.18	–	$845
Total valid votes		49,890	99.80		
Total rejected ballots		101	0.20	–0.02	
Turnout		49,991	62.74	–2.11	
Eligible voters		79,680			
Reform hold		Swing		+2.55	
Source: Elections Canada

1993 Canadian federal election
Party	Candidate	Votes	%	±%
Reform	Hugh Hanrahan	19,541	39.33	+17.09
Liberal	Chris Peirce	19,137	38.52	+20.63
Progressive Conservative	Scott Thorkelson	5,617	11.31	–22.16
New Democratic	Rita Egan	2,513	5.06	–20.26
National	Adrian Greenwood	2,129	4.29	–
Green	Harry Garfinkle	286	0.58	+0.28
Natural Law	Maury Shapka	284	0.57	–
Independent	Naomi Rankin	92	0.19	–0.16
Canada Party	Oran Johnson	83	0.17	–
Total valid votes		49,682	99.78	
Total rejected ballots		112	0.22	+0.00
Turnout		49,794	64.85	–14.86
Eligible voters		76,779		
Reform gain		Swing		
Source: Elections Canada

1988 Canadian federal election
Party	Candidate	Votes	%	±%
Progressive Conservative	Scott Thorkelson	18,088	33.46	–27.97
New Democratic	Halyna Freeland	13,686	25.32	+5.10
Reform	Doug Main	12,024	22.25	–
Liberal	Una MacLean-Evans	9,672	17.89	+2.41
Rhinoceros	Marcel Zeeto Kotowich	199	0.37	–
Green	Isabelle Foord	159	0.29	–0.56
Independent	Kevin Bruce	86	0.16	–
Independent	Daniel P. Hermansen	56	0.10	–
Independent	Mary Joyce	43	0.08	–
Confederation of Regions	Thomas Roger Brown	40	0.07	–1.29
Total valid votes		54,053	99.78	
Total rejected ballots		118	0.22	–0.03
Turnout		54,171	79.71	+11.87
Eligible voters		67,962		
Progressive Conservative hold		Swing		–16.54
Source: Elections Canada

1984 Canadian federal election
Party	Candidate	Votes	%	±%
Progressive Conservative	David Kilgour	33,712	61.43	+2.06
New Democratic	Doris S. Burghardt	11,095	20.22	+8.21
Liberal	Sandra Douglas--Tubb	8,500	15.49	–11.66
Confederation of Regions	Lorne Cass	749	1.37	–
Green	Russell John Mulvey	466	0.85	–
Social Credit	Norman Utz	218	0.40	–
Communist	Anne McGrath	137	0.25	–0.01
Total valid votes		54,877	99.75	
Total rejected ballots		139	0.25	+0.03
Turnout		55,016	67.84	+9.48
Eligible voters		81,096		
Progressive Conservative hold		Swing		
Source: Elections Canada

1980 Canadian federal election
Party	Candidate	Votes	%	±%
Progressive Conservative	David Kilgour	23,920	59.38	–0.09
Liberal	John Borger	10,938	27.15	–0.91
New Democratic	Doug Trace	4,837	12.01	–0.04
Rhinoceros	Dave Walker	453	1.12	–
Communist	Joe Hill	106	0.26	–0.01
Marxist–Leninist	Sandy Mowat	31	0.08	–0.09
Total valid votes		40,285	99.78	
Total rejected ballots		88	0.22	+0.00
Turnout		40,373	58.36	–9.41
Eligible voters		69,180		
Progressive Conservative hold		Swing		+0.50
Source: Elections Canada

1979 Canadian federal election
Party	Candidate	Votes	%	±%
Progressive Conservative	David Kilgour	26,430	59.47	+4.73
Liberal	Julian Kinisky	12,471	28.06	–2.35
New Democratic	Robert Davidson	5,352	12.04	+0.54
Communist	Joe Hill	120	0.27	–0.01
Marxist–Leninist	Carol Arnold	73	0.16	–0.00
Total valid votes		44,446	99.78	
Total rejected ballots		98	0.22	–0.04
Turnout		44,544	67.77	+0.06
Eligible voters		65,732		
Progressive Conservative hold		Swing		+3.54
Source: Elections Canada

1974 Canadian federal election
Party	Candidate	Votes	%	±%
Progressive Conservative	Douglas Roche	25,808	54.73	+5.01
Liberal	B.C. Tanner	14,337	30.41	–0.31
New Democratic	Lila Fahlman	5,426	11.51	–5.30
Social Credit	Leif Oddson	1,146	2.43	+0.08
Independent	Robin Gillespie	226	0.48	–
Communist	Harry Strynadka	132	0.28	–
Marxist–Leninist	Margaret Peggy Askin	79	0.17	–
Total valid votes		47,154	99.74	
Total rejected ballots		124	0.26	–0.40
Turnout		47,278	67.71	–11.38
Eligible voters		69,820		
Progressive Conservative hold		Swing		+2.66
Source: Library of Parliament

1972 Canadian federal election
Party	Candidate	Votes	%	±%
Progressive Conservative	Douglas Roche	26,908	49.72	+11.89
Liberal	Hu Harries	16,625	30.72	–21.63
New Democratic	Howard Alfred Leeson	9,098	16.81	+9.99
Social Credit	Bill Pelech	1,272	2.35	–
Independent	Elizabeth Rowley	152	0.28	–2.72
Independent	Peggy Morton	63	0.12	–2.88
Total valid votes		54,118	99.34	
Total rejected ballots		358	0.66	+0.11
Turnout		54,476	79.09	+4.60
Eligible voters		68,877		
Progressive Conservative gain from Liberal		Swing		+16.76
Source: Library of Parliament

1968 Canadian federal election
Party	Candidate	Votes	%	±%
Liberal	Hu Harries	21,074	52.35	+22.59
Progressive Conservative	Terry Nugent	15,228	37.83	–0.22
New Democratic	Lawrence Radcliffe	2,745	6.82	–3.28
Independent	John R. Beatty	1,206	3.00	–
Total valid votes		40,253	99.45	
Total rejected ballots		221	0.55	–0.26
Turnout		40,474	74.49	–2.81
Eligible voters		54,336		
Liberal gain from Progressive Conservative		Swing		+11.40
Source: Library of Parliament

1965 Canadian federal election
Party	Candidate	Votes	%	±%
Progressive Conservative	Terry Nugent	21,004	38.05	+2.68
Liberal	Bill Sinclair	16,431	29.77	–0.57
Social Credit	Sigurd Sorenson	11,696	21.19	–4.74
New Democratic	Bill McLean	5,572	10.10	+1.73
Independent	Bill Stocks	493	0.89	–
Total valid votes		55,196	99.19	
Total rejected ballots		450	0.81	+0.31
Turnout		55,646	77.30	–3.65
Eligible voters		71,989		
Progressive Conservative hold		Swing		+1.63
Source: Library of Parliament

1963 Canadian federal election
Party	Candidate	Votes	%	±%
Progressive Conservative	Terry Nugent	18,880	35.37	+0.98
Liberal	John Decore	16,195	30.34	+4.60
Social Credit	Sigurd (S.A.) Sorenson	13,841	25.93	–3.22
New Democratic	Ian Sowton	4,464	8.36	–2.37
Total valid votes		53,380	99.50	
Total rejected ballots		266	0.50	–0.27
Turnout		53,646	80.95	+6.07
Eligible voters		66,269		
Progressive Conservative hold		Swing		+2.79
Source: Library of Parliament

1962 Canadian federal election
Party	Candidate	Votes	%	±%
Progressive Conservative	Terry Nugent	16,030	34.39	–26.93
Social Credit	Sigurd (S.A.) Sorenson	13,585	29.15	+11.92
Liberal	Roy C. Marler	11,996	25.74	+8.64
New Democratic	Bill McLean	5,001	10.73	+6.38
Total valid votes		46,612	99.23	
Total rejected ballots		363	0.77	+0.02
Turnout		46,975	74.88	–3.26
Eligible voters		62,734		
Progressive Conservative hold		Swing		–19.43
Source: Library of Parliament

1958 Canadian federal election
Party	Candidate	Votes	%	±%
Progressive Conservative	Terry Nugent	25,885	61.32	+32.73
Social Credit	Sydney Herbert Thompson	7,270	17.22	–18.43
Liberal	Richmond Francis Hanna	7,218	17.10	–12.05
Co-operative Commonwealth	Arnold Holmes	1,838	4.35	–2.26
Total valid votes		42,211	99.25	
Total rejected ballots		320	0.75	–0.04
Turnout		42,531	78.14	+4.73
Eligible voters		54,429		
Progressive Conservative gain		Swing		
Source: Library of Parliament

1957 Canadian federal election
Party	Candidate	Votes	%	±%
Social Credit	Sydney Herbert Thompson	13,124	35.65	–1.05
Liberal	Richmond Francis Hanna	10,731	29.15	–8.18
Progressive Conservative	Terry Nugent	10,525	28.59	+11.77
Co-operative Commonwealth	Floyd Albin Johnson	2,434	6.61	–2.54
Total valid votes		36,814	99.21	
Total rejected ballots		293	0.79	–0.04
Turnout		37,107	73.41	+12.08
Eligible voters		50,546		
Social Credit gain		Swing		
Source: Library of Parliament

1953 Canadian federal election
Party	Candidate	Votes	%
Liberal	Richmond Francis Hanna	8,901	37.33
Social Credit	Orvis A. Kennedy	8,750	36.70
Progressive Conservative	Sidney Giffard Main	4,012	16.83
Co-operative Commonwealth	Floyd Albin Johnson	2,182	9.15
Total valid votes		23,845	99.17
Total rejected ballots		199	0.83
Turnout		24,044	61.33
Eligible voters		39,202	
Source: Library of Parliament

== See also ==
- List of Canadian electoral districts
- Historical federal electoral districts of Canada
