= Liberal Party of Canada candidates in the 1945 Canadian federal election =

The Liberal Party of Canada fielded candidates in the 1945 Canadian federal election, and won seats to form their third consecutive majority government. Many of the party's candidates have their own biography pages; information about others may be found here.

== Alberta ==
=== Vegreville: Albert Ernest Archer ===
Albert Ernest Archer received 4,806 votes (28.45%), finishing second against Social Credit incumbent Anthony Hlynka. See his biography for further details.

=== Wetaskiwin: Robert Henry Charles Harrison ===
Robert Harrison was a barrister. He received 3,040 votes (16.68%), finishing fourth against Social Credit incumbent Norman Jaques.

The website of the Glenbow Museum of Alberta includes references to a Queen's Counsel named Robert H. Harrison, who was inducted as an honorary chief of the Tsuu T'ina Nation in 1967. It is possible that this is the same person as the 1945 candidate.
