= Co-operative Commonwealth Federation candidates in the 1940 Canadian federal election =

The Cooperative Commonwealth Federation ran candidates in the 1940 Canadian federal election, and elected six members to emerge as the fourth-largest party. Some of the party's candidates have their own biography pages; information about others may be found here.

== Alberta ==
=== Vegreville: Herbert R. Boutillier ===
Herbert R. Boutillier was a farmer, and was active in farm organizations. Living a riding with a large Ukrainian Canadian population, he learned to speak the Ukrainian language passably. He received 1,658 votes (11.78%) in 1940, finishing fourth against Social Credit candidate Anthony Hlynka. He later died at age 52.

Boutillier's father, Arthur Moren Boutillier, represented Vegreville in the House of Commons of Canada from 1925 to 1926 as member of the Progressive Party.

=== Wetaskiwin: Robert Henry Haskins ===
Robert Henry Haskins was a farmer. He received 2,539 votes (16.24%), finishing third against Social Credit incumbent Norman Jaques.
