= Liberal Party of Canada candidates in the 1940 Canadian federal election =

The Liberal Party of Canada ran 242 candidates in the 1940 Canadian federal election, and elected 179 members to form a second consecutive majority government.

== Provinces ==
=== Alberta ===
Riding	Candidate's Name	Notes	Gender	Residence	Occupation	Votes	%	Rank
Acadia	Arthur M. Day		M		Physician	3,740	45.01	2nd
Athabaska	Joseph Miville Dechene	Former member of the Legislative Assembly of Alberta.	M		Agent	5,961	46.46	1st
Battle River	Ernest Arthur Pitman		M		Farmer	3,808	31.08	2nd
Bow River	A.B. Claypool		M		Farmer	4,050	25.71	2nd
Calgary East	George Henry Ross		M		Barrister	5,815	27.54	1st
Calgary West	Manley Justin Edwards		M		Barrister	7,299	36.87	1st
Camrose	Charles Claeys		M		Farmer	4,443	34.53	2nd
Edmonton East	Frederick Clayton Casselman		M		Barrister	8,948	43.67	1st
Edmonton West	James Angus MacKinnon	Incumbent Member of Parliament (MP) and cabinet minister	M		Manager	12,350	56.87	1st
Jasper—Edson	Arthur Allan Knight		M		Farmer	6,283	37.89	2nd
Lethbridge	Lynden Eldon Fairbairn		M		Barrister	5,538	35.72	2nd
Macleod	Francis Olestes McKennal		M		Barrister	4,829	28.91	2nd
Medicine Hat	Frederick William Gershaw	Formerly MP for Medicine Hat from 1925 to 1935	M		Physician	9,439	63.08	1st
Peace River	John Sissons		M		Barrister	6,426	41.28	1st
Red Deer	Absalom Clark Bury		M		Notary	4,134	27.23	2nd
Vergreville	Albert Ernest Archer		M		Physician	4,605	32.72	2nd
Wetaskwin	Walter Stephen Campbell	Also ran for Wetaskiwin in the 1935 election	M		Agent	4,392	28.10	2nd

Source: Library of Parliament.
