= Steinhauer =

Steinhauer (German for stonemason) is a surname. Notable people with the surname include:

- Ernst Steinhauer (1925–2005), West German sprint canoer
- Gustav Steinhauer (c. 1870–1930), German spy
- Henry Bird Steinhauer (1804–1885), Canadian Methodist clergyman
- Johann Steinhauer (1705–1779), Latvian entrepreneur, social reformer and landowner
- Neal Steinhauer (1944–2020), United States shotputter
- Olen Steinhauer (born 1972), United States novelist
- Orlondo Steinauer (born 1973), former Canadian football safety
- Ralph Steinhauer (1905–1987), Canadian politician
- Sherri Steinhauer (born 1962), United States golfer
- Tomer Steinhauer (born 1966), Israeli basketball coach and former player

== See also ==
- Steinhauer, Edmonton, residential neighborhood in Canada
