= Saddle Lake Cree Nation =

Canadian First Nation

- Band No. 462
- ᐅᓂᐦᒋᑭᐢᑿᐱᐏᓂᕽ onihcikiskwapiwinihk
- People: Cree
- Treaty: Treaty 6
- Province: Alberta

Land
- Other reserves: Saddle Lake 125; Whitefish Lake 128; Blue Quills (shared)
- Land area: 304.195 km^{2} (117.450 sq mi)

Population (2025)
- On reserve: 6757
- Off reserve: 4528
- Total population: 11285

Government
- Chief: Dale Steinhauer

Website
- slcn125.ca

Saddle Lake Cree Nation (Cree: ᐅᓂᐦᒋᑭᐢᑿᐱᐏᓂᕽ, romanized: onihcikiskwapiwinihk) is a Plains Cree, First Nations community, located in the Amiskwacīwiyiniwak ("Beaver Hills") region of central Alberta, Canada. The Nation is a signatory to Treaty 6, and their traditional language is Plains Cree.

Saddle Lake's governing structure is unusual in that it has two separate councils and chiefs governing their two reserves, Saddle Lake Cree Nation (proper) and the Whitefish Lake First Nation (often called "Whitefish (Goodfish) Lake First Nation" to distinguish it from a similarly named group in Manitoba). For the purposes of the Indian Act, however, Saddle Lake and Whitefish have a single shared band government, and the two reserves are considered to be one Nation.

In June 2013, the Nation reported a population of 9,934 people, of which 6,148 people lived on their own Reserve. Their reported population size makes Saddle Lake the second most populous First Nation in Alberta (after the Kainai Nation also known as the Blood people). Of these, 2,378 were members of the Whitefish Lake First Nation, with 1,778 of those living on-reserve, and remainder are members of the Saddle Lake Cree Nation proper.

== History ==
=== Pre-contact to treaty ===
In 1876, the Amiskwacīwiyiniwak, who were a loose confederation of Cree and Assiniboine band societies (part of the wider Iron Confederation), entered into a treaty relationship with Canada through Treaty 6. Chief Onchaminahos ("Little Hunter"), representing the Saddle Lake Band of Cree, and Chief Pakân ("Nut"), representing Whitefish Lake Band of Cree together represented the people of the Saddle Lake Cree Nation at the negotiations and signing at Fort Pitt (now in Saskatchewan). Chief Pakan, along with Big Bear argued for one large reserve of 1,000 square miles (2,600 km^{2}) for all the Plains and Woods Cree in the West, so they could hunt and farm together. When the government did not agree to this, Pakan's and Big Bear's bands refused to settle on reserves until better term were offered; Pakan went to Regina with the Métis translator Peter Erasmus in 1884 to discuss the matter with the Indian commissioner.

=== Amalgamation of bands ===
In 1902, four historical Cree bands were amalgamated as the Saddle Lake Cree Nation. The four Cree Bands were:

- Onchaminahos's Band, led by Chief Onchaminahos ("Little Hunter"; also known as Thomas Hunter)
- Seenum's Band, led by Chief Pakân ("Nut", also known as James Seenum)
- Blue Quill's Band, led by Chief Blue Quill
- Wasatnow's Band, led by Chief Muskegwatic ("Bear Ears")

However, the amalgamation process was not fully completed until 1953 when the treaty pay lists of the Little Hunter's, James Seenum's and Blue Quill's Bands were merged.

=== Election reforms ===
Before 1985, First Nations women who married non-indigenous men automatically lost their Status as "Registered Indians" under the Indian Act .After the passage of Bill C-31 in 1985, women no longer lost status for "marrying out" but the Saddle Lake and Whitefish Lake councils continued to prevent such women from voting in band council elections. This was challenged in two court cases in 2022. The Federal Court (Canada) ruled against the Whitefish Lake council and in favour of women who had brought suit against the council in February 2023. The case against the Saddle Lake council was still being heard as of 2023.

=== Gender Affirming Health Care for tastawiyiniwak as a Treaty right ===
According to article 6 "Medicine Chest" of the Treaty, the Cree are entitled to access medicare. The Nation's lawmakers seeks to enact laws to provide gender fluid 2 spirited ' tastawiyiniwak' (in between people) with gender affirming care with in their territories. They aim to attract health care professionals to assist with this vision of the nation becoming a haven for gender affirmative care. In addition as well to expand the healthcare capabilities of the nation with greater presence of healthcare professionals. The nation plan to establish virtual hubs with the ambition of becoming precedent for other Indigenous Nations to model their attempts at self governing healthcare. In addition the Nation has established a go fund me campaign to help finance the legal challenges against the 2025 Bill 9 bans of Gender Affirming care.

== Reserves ==
There are three reserves under the governance of the Saddle Lake Cree Nation, one of which is shared with five other bands:

- 96.20 hectares (237.7 acres) Blue Quills, formerly known as the "Blue Quill Indian Reserve 127", shared with five other bands (see article)
- 25,780.60 hectares (63,705.2 acres) Saddle Lake 125, containing the community of Saddle Lake, Alberta
- 4,542.70 hectares (11,225.3 acres) Whitefish Lake 128; the reserve is also known as "Whitefish Lake Indian Reserve 128" or as "Goodfish Lake Indian Reserve 128", and occasionally as "Whitefish (Goodfish) Lake Indian Reserve 128"

Originally, Chief Muskegwatic had also reserved Washatanow (or Hollow Hill Creek) Indian Reserve 126 along the north bank of the North Saskatchewan River. However, this reserve was surrendered in 1896 in exchange for an equal area of land adjoining Saddle Lake Indian Reserve 125, known today as the "Cache Lake Addition" of the Saddle Lake Indian Reserve 125. Blue Quill Indian Reserve 127 was originally reserved for the use by the Blue Quill's Band, but in 1896, a boarding school (Sacred Heart Indian Residential School, commonly called the "Saddle Lake Boarding School") was relocated from Lac la Biche, Alberta, to the Blue Quill Indian Reserve, and the Band relocated to the Saddle Lake Indian Reserve. In 1931, Blue Quill Indian Reserve 127 became a shared Reserve when the boarding school relocated to St. Paul, Alberta.

Saddle Lake Indian Reserve 125 is bordered by Smoky Lake County, the County of St. Paul No. 19, and County of Two Hills No. 21.

== Governance ==
Saddle Lake Cree Nation elect their officials through a custom electoral system. Additionally, this Cree Nation maintains two groups of elected officials:

=== Saddle Lake Cree Nation ===
Saddle Lake Cree Nation on the Saddle Lake Indian Reserve have elected Chief Dale Steinhauer, and Councillors John Large, Eddy Makokis, Glen Jason Whiskeyjack, James Steinhauer, Kenton Cardinal, Arthur Steinhauer, Charles Cardinal and Kevin Delver.

=== Whitefish Lake First Nation ===
Saddle Lake Cree Nation on the White Fish Lake Indian Reserve, governing the Reserve as the Whitefish Lake First Nation, also have elected officials. The Whitefish Lake First Nation have elected Chief Tom Houle, and Councillors Stan Houle, Greg Sparklingeyes, and Kevin Halfe.

== Notable people ==
- Gwen Bridge, environmental scientist and conservation advocate
- James Makokis, doctor, specialist in traditional medicine, transgender and Indigenous healthcare
- Northern Cree, powwow and round dance drum group
- Carl Quinn, singer-songwriter
- Nicholas Half, head doctor, specialist in genecology and reproductive medicine
- Nitasha Half, retired American kickboxing/mma champion, animal activist, animal rescue of 300 + saves
- Doreen Spence, nurse, human rights activist
- Lana Whiskeyjack, ipkDoc, professor, women and gender activist, and artist.
- Ralph Steinhauer, tenth lieutenant governor of Alberta
- Henry Bird Steinhauer, Methodist Leader and Teacher
