= John Decore =

Canadian politician

Member of Parliament for Vegreville
- In office 1949–1957
- Preceded by: Anthony Hlynka
- Succeeded by: Peter Stefura

Personal details
- Born: Ivan Dikur; April 9, 1909 Andrew, Alberta, Canada
- Died: November 11, 1994 (aged 85) Edmonton, Alberta, Canada
- Party: Liberal Party of Canada
- Spouse: Myrosia
- Children: Laurence, John, Leighton
- Occupation: Lawyer

John N. Decore MP QC (born Ivan Dikur; April 9, 1909 – November 11, 1994) was a Canadian barrister, lawyer, teacher, and politician from Alberta.

Decore was born Ivan Dikur on a farm 5 miles (8.0 km) west of Andrew, Alberta, in a district called Sniatyn, to Ukrainian immigrant parents Nykola and Hafia (née Kostiuk). Nykola arrived in Canada in 1898 at the age of ten; Nykola was Hafia's second husband. Hafia died when John was only four years old, and he did not get along with his stepmother.

He completed grade eleven before the Great Depression in Canada forced his father to stop supporting him financially. After attending the first eight grades at the local one-room school in Sniatyn, he moved to Vegreville and boarded with a woman from his father's home village. He later attended Eastwood School and Victoria School in Edmonton for grades 9 to 11, where he stayed in the bursa (dormitory) for Ukrainian students called the Hrushevsky Institute. Students at the Institute took classes in Ukrainian language and culture in the evenings in addition to their studies in the regular English-language Albertan curriculum. After completing grade eleven, he went to the Edmonton Normal School in 1929–30 and then taught in a series of rural schools in the region near Andrew.

He married Myroslava Kupchenko in 1935 and began attending the University of Alberta in a combined program that awarded him a B.A. in 1937 and an LL.B. in 1938. He articled in Vegreville and was called to the bar in 1939. At university, he played for the Golden Bears basketball team and was the national president of the Ukrainian Youth Association.

The couple lived in Vegreville, where Decore practiced law during the Second World War; he was rejected by the Canadian Armed Forces due to arthritis. He helped to lead work bees and fundraising efforts for a public pool so the children of men serving overseas would have recreational activities. He served as the president of the Kinsmen Club, the chamber of commerce, and the council of the local Ukrainian Orthodox Church, and was a school board trustee who promoted the hiring of Ukrainian-Canadian teachers.

He had anglicized his name to John by the 1940s. He first ran for the House of Commons as a Liberal candidate in the 1949 federal election. He defeated Social Credit incumbent Anthony Hlynka in the riding of Vegreville. He was re-elected in the 1953 election, once again defeating Hlynka. He was appointed an advisor to Lester B. Pearson during Pearson's time as Ambassador of Canada to the United Nations and gave several speeches in the United States, including representing Canada at U.N. Headquarters (then at Lake Success, New York) and speaking on Ukrainian issues at Carnegie Hall with U.S. Senator Lehman.

In Parliament, he was a vocal anti-communist and an activist for Ukrainian rights in both Canada and the Soviet Union. At his urging, Canadian immigration documents began to recognize "Ukrainian" as a nationality, and not merely the name of a regional population within the Soviet Union. He also advocated for allowing the members of the controversial 14th Waffen Grenadier Division of the SS (1st Galician) to immigrate to Canada. He considered his "crowning achievement" in politics to be arranging for Prime Minister Louis St. Laurent to open the Ukrainian Pioneer Home monument at Elk Island National Park in 1951. He also arranged for a concert of the Ukrainian Bandurist Chorus in the Railway Committee Room of Parliament and the creation of a Ukrainian-language service at Voice of Canada. He retired from Parliament in 1957. Decore attempted to return to federal politics in the 1962 election, this time in the Edmonton East electoral district, but he lost to Progressive Conservative (PC) incumbent William Skoreyko. He ran once more in the 1963 federal election in Edmonton—Strathcona, losing to PC incumbent Terry Nugent.

Decore was made a Q.C. in 1964. In 1965, he was appointed Chief Justice of the District Court of Northern Alberta and supervised its merger with the southern district court. He was also involved in the creation of the Court of Queen's Bench for Alberta in 1979. He retired as chief justice in that year and was awarded an honorary degree of Doctor of Laws in 1980.

Decore's son Laurence was mayor of Edmonton and leader of the Opposition in the Legislative Assembly of Alberta.
