= Albert Ernest Archer =

Canadian physician and political activist

Albert Ernest Joseph Mark Archer (14 December 1878 – 25 May 1949) was a Canadian physician and political activist. He is best known for his early efforts to promote national and provincial public health care systems. Some have argued that he deserves as much recognition as Tommy Douglas for the establishment of medicare in Canada.

== Early life and career ==
Archer was born and raised in Campbellford, Ontario, the son of a Methodist minister. His parents were both English emigrants. He trained in medicine, and completed his studies at the University of Toronto. He moved to the Lamont region of Alberta in 1903 as a Methodist medical missionary, and worked as a pioneer doctor, often travelling by dirt roads to treat his patients. In 1911, he convinced the Methodist Mission to construct a fifteen-bed hospital at Lamont at a cost of $15,000. The hospital opened the following year, and Archer served as its superintendent until his death.

Archer was president of the Canadian Medical Association, Alberta Branch in 1921–22, and of the Canadian Medical Association (CMA) in 1942–43.

== Health care activism ==
Archer was one of the first prominent advocates for public health care in Canada. In 1932, he presented a brief from the College of Physicians and Surgeons of Alberta to a commission on health care established by the Government of Alberta. The committee subsequently recommended the establishment of separate rural and urban health plans, in which the government would pay two-ninths of the total cost. Although modest by modern standards, this was a significant initiative for its time. The United Farmers of Alberta government passed these recommendations as the Alberta Health Insurance Act in February 1935, but was voted out of office in the 1935 provincial election before it could implement the program. The next government, composed by the Alberta Social Credit Party, did not continue with the insurance plan.

As president of the CMA, Archer chaired a special meeting wherein the assembled delegates voted 73–0 in favour of a health insurance plan for Canada. He supported Prime Minister William Lyon Mackenzie King's national health insurance proposal in 1945, and travelled the country to promote the plan. Although King's government was re-elected in the 1945 federal election, the plan was never enacted due to a dispute with the Government of Ontario over tax revenues.

Archer continued to support health insurance reform in Alberta. A year before his death, the Alberta government passed legislative for a medical insurance program. This led to the creation of Medical Services (Alberta) Incorporated, a non-profit plan started by Alberta doctors.

== Political candidate ==
Archer was a candidate of the Liberal Party of Canada in the federal elections of 1940 and 1945, running in the rural Alberta riding of Vegreville. He narrowly won the Liberal nomination in 1940, defeating Peter Lazarowich by a vote of 110 to 104. In 1945, he won the nomination without opposition. On both occasions, he was defeated by the Social Credit Party of Canada's Anthony Hlynka.

He died in Lamont, Alberta, in 1949.

== Electoral record ==
1945 Canadian federal election: Vegreville
Party	Candidate	Votes	%
Social Credit	Anthony Hlynka	7,146	42.30
Liberal	Albert Ernest Archer	4,806	28.45
Labour Progressive	William Halina	3,272	19.37
Co-operative Commonwealth	Michael Tomyn	1,668	9.87
Total valid votes		16,892	100.00
Total rejected ballots		187	
Turnout		17,079	80.21
Electors on the lists		21,292	

1940 Canadian federal election: Vegreville
Party	Candidate	Votes	%
Social Credit	Anthony Hlynka	5,083	36.12
Liberal	Albert Ernest Archer	4,605	32.72
United Progressive	William Halina	2,727	19.38
Co-operative Commonwealth	Herbert R. Boutillier	1,658	11.78
Total valid votes		14,073	100.00
Total rejected ballots		141	
Turnout		14,214	61.22
Electors on the lists		23,219	
