= Canadian House of Commons Standing Committee on Natural Resources =

Standing committee of the House of Commons of Canada

The House of Commons Standing Committee on Natural Resources (RNNR) is a standing committee of the House of Commons of Canada.

== Mandate ==
- The management, operation, budget and legislation of the Department of Natural Resources and its affiliated agencies:
  - The Canadian Nuclear Safety Commission
  - Atomic Energy of Canada Limited
  - The National Energy Board
- The current and future state of oil and gas pipelines and refining capacity in Canada
- Resource development in Northern Canada
- The state of the forestry sector in Canada

== Membership ==
As of the 45th Canadian Parliament:

Party	Member	District
Liberal	Terry Duguid, chair	Winnipeg South, MB
Conservative	Shannon Stubbs, vice chair	Lakeland, AB
Bloc Quebecois	Mario Simard, vice chair	Jonquière, QC
Liberal	John-Paul Danko	Hamilton West—Ancaster—Dundas, ON
Liberal	Claude Guay	LaSalle—Émard—Verdun, QC
Liberal	Corey Hogan	Calgary Confederation, AB
Conservative	Gaétan Malette	Kapuskasing—Timmins—Mushkegowuk, ON
Conservative	Richard Martel	Chicoutimi—Le Fjord, QC
Liberal	Ron McKinnon	Coquitlam—Port Coquitlam, BC
Conservative	Corey Tochor	Saskatoon—University, SK

== Subcommittees ==
- Subcommittee on Agenda and Procedure (SRNN)
