= Vegreville—Wainwright =

Former federal electoral district in Alberta, Canada

Coordinates: 53.56°N 111.62°W

Alberta electoral district
- Vegreville—Wainwright in relation to the other Alberta federal electoral districts

Defunct federal electoral district
- Legislature: House of Commons
- District created: 2003
- District abolished: 2013
- First contested: 2004
- Last contested: 2011
- District webpage: profile, map

Demographics
- Population (2011): 117,230
- Electors (2011): 83,038
- Area (km²): 29,882.24
- Census division(s): Division No. 7, Division No. 10, Division No. 11, Division No. 12
- Census subdivision(s): Strathcona County, Lloydminster, Two Hills, Leduc County, County of Vermilion River, County of St. Paul No. 19, County of Two Hills No. 21, Beaver County, Vegreville, Wainwright, Vermilion, Lamont County

Vegreville—Wainwright was a federal electoral district in Alberta, Canada, that was represented in the House of Commons of Canada from 2004 to 2015.

== History ==
This riding was created in 2003 from Lakeland, Elk Island and Crowfoot ridings. It now represents Lamont County, the County of Two Hills No. 21, the County of Minburn No. 27, Strathcona County, Beaver County, the County of Vermilion River, Flagstaff County, the Municipal District of Provost No. 52, and the Alberta portion of Lloydminster.

== Member of Parliament ==
This riding has elected the following members of Parliament:

Vegreville—Wainwright
Parliament	Years	Member	Party
Riding created from Lakeland, Elk Island, Crowfoot and Wetaskiwin
38th	2004–2006	Leon Benoit	Conservative
39th	2006–2008	Leon Benoit	Conservative
40th	2008–2011	Leon Benoit	Conservative
41st	2011–2015	Leon Benoit	Conservative
Riding dissolved into Battle River—Crowfoot, Lakeland, Sherwood Park—Fort Saskatchewan and Edmonton—Wetaskiwin

== Election results ==
2011 Canadian federal election
Party	Candidate	Votes	%	±%	Expenditures
Conservative	Leon Benoit	39,145	79.80	+2.71	$64,471.55
New Democratic	Ray Stone	5,561	11.34	+1.88	$490.67
Green	William Munsey	2,499	5.09	–3.12	$1,040.38
Liberal	Ron Williams	1,525	3.11	–2.13	$3,758.89
Christian Heritage	Matthew Sokalski	327	0.67	–	none listed
Total valid votes/expense limit		49,057	99.79	–	$101,365.25
Total rejected ballots		101	0.21	–0.06	
Turnout		49,158	58.67	+4.64	
Eligible voters		83,790			
Conservative hold		Swing		+2.29	
Source: Elections Canada

2008 Canadian federal election
Party	Candidate	Votes	%	±%	Expenditures
Conservative	Leon Benoit	34,493	77.09	+2.92	$36,021.61
New Democratic	Ray Stone	4,230	9.45	+0.22	$2,948.62
Green	William Munsey	3,676	8.22	+0.75	$158.36
Liberal	Adam Campbell	2,345	5.24	–2.33	$2,586.45
Total valid votes/expense limit		44,744	99.73	–	$98,501.61
Total rejected ballots		120	0.27	+0.08	
Turnout		44,864	54.03	–10.54	
Eligible voters		83,038			
Conservative hold		Swing		+1.57	
Source: Elections Canada

2006 Canadian federal election
Party	Candidate	Votes	%	±%	Expenditures
Conservative	Leon Benoit	37,954	74.17	+0.63	$46,569.68
New Democratic	Len Legault	4,727	9.24	+0.98	$1,262.58
Liberal	Duff Stewart	3,873	7.57	–4.16	$7,173.09
Green	Brian Rozmahel	3,822	7.47	+0.99	$9,327.62
Western Block	Robert Peter Kratchmer	431	0.84	–	$1,061.44
Christian Heritage	Blaine William Stephan	364	0.71	–	$410.28
Total valid votes/expense limit		51,171	99.81	–	$90,645.30
Total rejected ballots		95	0.19	–0.08	
Turnout		51,266	64.57	+5.01	
Eligible voters		79,393			
Conservative hold		Swing		–	
Source: Elections Canada

2004 Canadian federal election
Party	Candidate	Votes	%	±%	Expenditures
Conservative	Leon Benoit	33,800	73.54	–	$50,675.44
Liberal	Duff Stewart	5,390	11.73	–	$17,172.70
New Democratic	Len Legault	3,793	8.25	–	$501.18
Green	James (Jim) Kenney	2,976	6.48	–	$554.15
Total valid votes/expense limit		45,959	99.73	–	$87,006.65
Total rejected ballots		123	0.27	–	
Turnout		46,082	59.56	–	
Eligible voters		77,374			
Conservative notional hold		Swing		–	
Source: Elections Canada

== See also ==
- List of Canadian electoral districts
- Historical federal electoral districts of Canada
