= Frank Fane =

Canadian politician

- Official 1966 portrait

Member of Parliament for Vegreville
- In office March 31, 1958 – June 24, 1968
- Preceded by: Peter Stefura
- Succeeded by: Don Mazankowski

Personal details
- Born: Frank William John Fane; February 23, 1897 Beaver Lake, Alberta, Canada
- Died: January 6, 1980 (aged 82) Edmonton, Alberta, Canada
- Party: Progressive Conservative
- Profession: farmer
- Military career
- Allegiance: Canada
- Branch: Canadian Expeditionary Force
- Service years: 1914-1918
- Rank: Major
- Unit: 10th Battalion

Major Frank John William Fane MC ED (February 23, 1897 – January 6, 1980) was a farmer, World War I era soldier, and served as a Canadian municipal and federal politician from 1958 to 1968.

== Early life ==
Frank John William Fane was born February 23, 1897, in Beaver River, Alberta to Frank W. W. Fane of England and Margaret Duff of Scotland. Fane was educated at Beaver Lake, Vegreville and later at the Camrose Normal School and the University of Alberta. He married Amelia Engel on November 26, 1949, and together had two children.

== Military life ==
In 1914 during the First World War, Fane joined the Canadian Expeditionary Force as a private and later received his commission as Captain in the 10th Battalion, which he served with until 1918. Fane served in the Canadian Army Pay Corps amongst other service during the war. Fane remained in the Army reserve, and was promoted to major in the Canadian Active Service Force during the Second World War.

== Political life ==
Fane began his political career as a Municipal Councillor in the small town of Mundare. He also served the municipal government as Chair of the Mundare School Board.

Fane first ran for a House of Commons of Canada seat in the 1957 federal election. He was defeated by Social Credit candidate Peter Stefura finishing in second last place in a slate of 5 candidates. Parliament would dissolve one year later, Fane would run against Stefura and defeat him winning the Vegreville electoral district. He would run for his second term in office in the 1962 federal election once again defeating Stefura.

The Progressive Conservative government lost the confidence of parliament forcing the 1963 federal election. Fane would retain his district with a landslide victory, the largest of career, defeating Social Credit candidate Metro Tomyn and Liberal candidate and future Lieutenant Governor of Alberta Ralph Steinhauer. He would run for his final term in office in the 1965 federal election once again retaining his district in other landslide. Fane retired from federal politics in 1968.

He died in Edmonton in 1980.
