= Doreen Spence =

Canadian indigenous rights activist

Elder Doreen Spence OC
- Born: 1937 (age 88–89); Saddle Lake Cree Nation
- Occupation: Nurse
- Known for: Indigenous rights activism

Elder Doreen Spence OC (born 1937) is a Canadian indigenous rights activist. She founded several indigenous rights organisations in Alberta and advises international organisations in indigenous rights issues.

== Life ==
Spence was born in the Saddle Lake Cree Nation in Alberta and was raised by her grandparents. At the age of 18, she moved to Calgary to attend a Christian college. She was among the first indigenous women to receive a Practical Nursing Certificate, when she finished her education in 1959, leading to a career as a nurse that lasted over 40 years. As a nurse in the 1950s, she stood up against the compulsory sterilization of an indigenous girl.

She was involved in indigenous rights issues both in Canada all over the world. In Calgary, she founded the Calgary Urban Aboriginal Initiative in order to advise the city in indigenous rights issues. She served as president of the Plains Indian Cultural Survival School in Calgary, which was the first school run by and for indigenous people in an urban area in Canada. She was its president until 1993. She held several positions within municipal and regional advisory boards in Alberta; among others she was active from 1991 to 1993 in the Alberta Civil Liberties Association and from 1981 to 1993 the Committee Against Racism. She founded and directed the Canadian Indigenous Women's Resource Institute (CIWRI), which raises awareness with non-natives about native issues and educates natives in traditional knowledge. For the United Nations, she was the Canadian representative in the Working Group on Indigenous Populations since July 1994. Together with others, she created the draft of the Declaration on the Rights of Indigenous Peoples, which was eventually adopted in 2007. In 2002, she advised the Slovak government in their relationship to Romani people in Slovakia.

Spence regularly speaks at international conferences. She is renowned for her speeches, which often include songs, traditional knowledge and encouragement for the audience to participate.

== Awards ==
Among others, Spence received:

- Chief David Crowchild Award 1992
- Alberta Human Rights Award 1993
- Nomination for the Nobel Peace Prize 2005 as part of the PeaceWomen Across the Globe project
- Alberta Centennial Medal 2005
- Indspire Awards 2017
- Officer of the Order of Canada 2020
