= William Hayhurst =

Canadian politician (1887-1975)

Member of Parliament for Vegreville
- In office 1935–1940
- Preceded by: Michael Luchkovich
- Succeeded by: Anthony Hlynka

Personal details
- Born: December 31, 1887 Lyvennet Mill, Morland, England
- Died: May 17, 1975 (aged 87) Edmonton, Alberta, Canada
- Party: Social Credit
- Spouse: Edna Mattern
- Profession: Farmer, principal, teacher

William Hayhurst (December 31, 1887 – May 19, 1975) was a farmer, principal, teacher, businessman and a Canadian federal politician. He was born in Lyvennet Mill, Morland, England. Married Edna Mattern. Father of William LeRoy Hayhurst (born May 25, 1925; died February 27, 2011), Dea Crompton and Grace Lanctot (died August 13, 1998).

Hayhurst first ran a seat in the House of Commons of Canada in the 1930 Canadian federal election as a Liberal candidate in the Wetaskiwin district. He was defeated by Incumbent William Irvine, finishing last in a field of three candidates.

Hayhurst ran again in the 1935 Canadian federal election, this time under the Social Credit banner in the Vegreville district. Hayhurst's nomination as the Social Credit candidate was controversial. At the time, the Vegreville Social Credit organization had a two-stage nomination process: delegates elected three candidates at a nomination meeting, one of whom was later chosen by an advisory board. Paul Lesiuk, a teacher of Ukrainian background, actually received the greatest number of votes, but the board decided to give the nomination to Hayhurst, the second-place candidate. Many Ukrainian members of Social Credit opposed this decision, and refused to support Hayhurst in the general election. He narrowly defeated Co-operative Commonwealth Federation incumbent Michael Luchkovich in a hotly contested five-way race. Social Credit had little presence outside Alberta in this period, and Hayhurst sat as an opposition MP.

Anthony Hlynka, Hayhurst's successor as MP for Vegreville, described him as a "polite, intelligent and well-read" man who "carried out his duties as an MP quite well, but [...] had a difficult time representing a riding in which eighty per cent of the population was of other than British origin". He occasionally made parliamentary statements in support of Ukrainian national aspirations, but had difficulty communicating with his constituents. Many Ukrainian members of the Social Credit party asked him to seek re-election in Athabaska rather than run again in Vegreville in the 1940 federal election. He ignored this advice, and let his name stand at the Vegreville Social Credit nomination meeting in September 1939. The result was an unexpected embarrassment: he finished last in a field of five candidates on the first ballot, and was automatically eliminated.

After his nomination defeat, Hayhurst belatedly decided to seek the Social Credit nomination in Athabaska. He won the nomination, but lost to Liberal Joseph Miville Dechene in the general election. Hayhurst officially appeared on the ballot as the candidate of the New Democracy party, an affiliate of Social Credit. He died in Edmonton in 1975.
