= Gwen Bridge =

Environmental scientist and conservation advocate

- Born: British Columbia, Canada
- Education: University of Victoria, University of Alberta
- Scientific career
- Fields: Environmental science

Gwen Bridge is an environmental scientist and conservation advocate. Her work has focused on sustainable land management practices to help facilitate the cultural preservation of Indigenous communities across North America.

== Early life and education ==
Gwen Bridge was raised near Nelson, British Columbia and is of Saddle Lake Cree Nation heritage. Her father was an environmental activist who advocated to protect natural parklands. Bridge completed her Bachelor of Science in environmental studies and geography at the University of Victoria and her M.Sc. at the University of Alberta in forest hydrology.

== Work and advocacy ==
Bridge began her career as a field hydrologist and later became more focused on providing strategic planning, title and rights protection strategies and policy development and analysis for First Nations with respect to resource management.

Bridge's work has largely focused on the concept of combining the fields of hydrology, ecology and conservation biology together with traditional indigenous knowledge and expertise. She believes that the outcome of unifying these scientific fields with traditional indigenous experience would lead not only to improvements in biodiversity conservation, but would also promote cultural sustainability and resilience.

Her work includes collaborations with the Mescalero Apache, the Makah Tribe and the Okanagan Nation. She was the Chair of the Syilx Working Group which conducted the South Okanagan Similkameen National Park Reserve Feasibility Study. Bridge has worked on facilitating relationships between First Nations and other levels of government such as Parks Canada and the Canadian Wildlife Service.

Bridge has recently commented on the negative effects of logging and road-building on the caribou population of south-eastern British Columbia.

== Personal life ==
Gwen Bridge lives in British Columbia with her husband and four children.
