= Ralph Steinhauer =

Canadian politician

The Honourable Ralph Steinhauer OC

10th Lieutenant Governor of Alberta
- In office July 2, 1974 – October 18, 1979
- Monarch: Elizabeth II
- Governors General: Jules Léger; Edward Schreyer
- Premier: Peter Lougheed
- Preceded by: Grant MacEwan
- Succeeded by: Frank C. Lynch-Staunton

Personal details
- Born: Ralph Garvin Apow; June 8, 1905 Morley, District of Alberta, North-West Territories
- Died: September 19, 1987 (aged 82) Edmonton, Alberta, Canada
- Party: Liberal
- Spouse: Isabel Florence Margaret Davidson
- Occupation: farmer

Ralph Garvin Steinhauer, OC (born Ralph Garvin Apow; June 8, 1905 – September 19, 1987) was a Canadian politician, the tenth lieutenant governor of Alberta, and the first Aboriginal person to become a lieutenant governor in Canada.

== Personal life ==
Ralph Garvin Apow (later Steinhauer) was born on June 8, 1905, at Morley, North-West Territories (prior to the establishment of Alberta as a province), the second of four children to Josiah Apow and Amelia Mildred Mumford. Steinhauer was a treaty Indian of Cree descent. Steinhauers's father Josiah died in 1908, and his mother married James Arthur Steinhauer on October 12, 1910, a descendant of the Cree Methodist missionary Henry Bird Steinhauer.

He married Isabel Florence Margaret Davidson on November 20, 1928, and had five children. In 1937, Ralph Steinhauer was diagnosed with tuberculosis and a decision was made to send the three eldest children to a residential school. After his recovery, his wife Isabel educated the children at home after their request to have the children educated at a community school was denied on the basis of their Indigenous heritage.

Steinhauer became a farmer and began clearing a 16-hectare (40-acre) homestead, and continued farming until his death in 1987. During the Great Depression Steinhauer supplemented his farming work with other labour such as logging and cutting fence posts.

He died in Edmonton on September 19, 1987, following pulmonary problems.

== Education ==
Ralph Steinhauer moved schools several times as a child due to his father's work as a missionary. Steinhauer attended the residential school in Red Deer, the Doucet, Roseneath, Vilettea and Stry schools in northern Alberta and for three years starting in 1920 the Brandon Indian Residential School in Manitoba, and finished with a Grade 8 education. When Prime Minister Pierre Trudeau asked him to be the lieutenant governor of Alberta, he responded, "I'm not schooled for a thing like this... You're plucking a person out of the farmyard and an Indian at that."

== Career ==
In the 1920s, he became district president of the United Farmers of Alberta. He was a founder and the president of the Indian Association of Alberta.

He ran unsuccessfully as the Liberal candidate for the House of Commons of Canada in the Alberta riding of Vegreville in the 1963 federal election, placing a distant third behind Progressive Conservative Frank Fane and Social Credit candidate Metro Tomyn. Steinhauer was the second treaty Indian to run as a candidate in a federal election.

He was chief of the Saddle Lake Indian Band for three years between 1966 and 1969. He established the Saddle Lake Centennial Development Association, which became a successful farming venture for the First Nation.

== 10th lieutenant governor of Alberta ==
On the advice of Prime Minister Pierre Trudeau, Ralph Steinhauer was appointed Lieutenant Governor of Alberta effective July 2, 1974. This appointment was made by Jules Léger, Governor General of Canada. His senior aide-de-camp was Lieutenant-Colonel John H. Quarton, and his secretary was M. Patricia Halligan. Federal Justice Minister Otto Lang explained the significance of the appointment to the Edmonton Journal saying "The Queen's appointment of an Indian is historic in that it was the Queen [Victoria] who built a trust with the Indians of Canada so many years ago."

Steinhauer was known for voicing his personal opinions regarding Indigenous issues in Canada while holding the generally apolitical role as Lieutenant Governor. In 1977, during the opening of the third session of the 18th Alberta Legislature Steinhauer read the speech from the throne while dressed in the full regalia of a Cree chief, and on one his final days in the Legislature, Steinhauer while giving royal assent to legislation reflected on his time as Lieutenant Governor and in thanking the members of the assembly remarked "May the Great Spirit remain with you, and will you always carry on such a well-done job", becoming the first time the Great Spirit had been invoked in the provincial legislature. In a 1976 speech delivered at the University of Calgary, Steinhauer presented a list of injustices inflicted upon Indigenous peoples, and going so far as to suggest he might withhold royal assent for legislation affecting First Nations until there was some improvement.

In July 1976 Steinhauer headed a delegation commemorating the signing of Treaty 6 and Treaty 7 to Buckingham Palace. He had convinced Premier Peter Lougheed to support and finance the trip and had received the support of the governor general noting "it is the wish of the native people that a representative deputation of Chiefs…should visit the United Kingdom". However, the governor general and federal government wanted assurances that the visit to England would not be a political event, and Steinhauer agreed to ensure the occasion's apolitical nature. Upon being presented to the Queen, he disregarded apolitical protocol and raised Indigenous issues. On his return to Edmonton, Steinhauer's account was printed in the Edmonton Journal "I was just stating facts. Because of the Indian Act, aren’t we wards of the government? Isn’t that a fact? You should read the act. Just about every clause begins ‘With the consent of the governor-in-council the Indians shall…".

Later in 1977 Steinhauer was approached by several First Nations and the Alberta Human Rights and Civil Liberties Association about the potential effects of the proposed Bill 29 Land Title Amendment Act and the potential effect of amendments on treaty rights in Northern Alberta. Steinhauer had the legislation studied by a legal firm and in the end granted royal assent.

Ralph Steinhauer was Lieutenant Governor until his successor was appointed effective October 18, 1979. He then returned to his farm at Saddle Lake.

== Honours ==
In 1967, he was made an Officer of the Order of Canada. In 1984, he was inducted into the Alberta Agriculture Hall of Fame. Steinhauer also received an Honorary Doctor of Laws degrees from the University of Alberta in 1976 and the University of Calgary in 1979. In addition an Honorary Doctor of Divinity degree from St. Stephen's College, Edmonton in 1985. As well, he was a Knight of Grace of the Most Venerable Order of the Hospital of St. John of Jerusalem (1975). The Ralph Steinhauer Award of Distinction, a collegiate scholarship provided by the Government of Alberta, recognizes academic achievement.

== See also ==
- The Canadian Crown and Aboriginal peoples
