= Aubrey Levin =

South African-born Canadian psychiatrist (1938–2025)

- Born: 18 December 1938; Johannesburg, Gauteng Province, South Africa
- Died: 18 December 2025 (aged 87); Toronto, Ontario, Canada
- Other name: "Dr Shock"
- Occupations: Psychiatrist; Colonel South African Defence Force General Practitioner

Aubrey Levin (18 December 1938 – 18 December 2025) was a South African-born Canadian psychiatrist and colonel in the South African Defence Force (SADF) who used abusive procedures on homosexual army conscripts and conscientious objectors in an attempt to cure them of suspected same-sex attraction during the apartheid era of South Africa.

During the 1970s and 1980s, Levin subjected many homosexual men and women to electroshock or chemical castration, and over 900 conscripts were forced to undergo involuntary sexual reassignment surgery.

In 1995 Levin moved to Canada and acquired a license to practice medicine. He became professor of clinical psychiatry at the University of Calgary. In 2010 he was arrested for sexual assault of a patient; 30 men claimed they were assaulted by Levin during counseling. Levin was tried and convicted for assault, sentenced to five years in prison, and his medical license was suspended.

== Early life and education ==
Levin was born in Johannesburg, South Africa on 18 December 1938. His father was the first Jewish member of the National Party; a party that promoted white Afrikaner nationalism and ruled as the leading governing party in South Africa until the end of apartheid in April 1994.

He completed high school in 1954 and began his medical studies at the University of Pretoria supported by a South African Defence Force (SADF) scholarship. In 1968, while he was completing his studies to earn his license as a psychiatrist, he submitted a letter to the Secretary of the South African Parliament in Cape Town, to request that he present his work using electric shocks as a treatment for "homosexuals and lesbians", before the Select Committee on the Immorality Amendment Act. Some of his colleagues called him Dr Shock. He was qualified as a psychiatrist in 1969.

== South African Defence Force ==
Because of his license as a psychiatrist, he was given the rank of Colonel when he joined the South African Defence Force (SADF). In 1971 he became Team Leader at SADF's Drug Rehabilitation Program at Ward 22 of 1 Military Hospital at Voortrekkerhoogte, near Pretoria.

=== The Aversion Project ===
It was at 1 Military Hospital, Voortrekkerhoogte, which is now known as Thaba Tshwane, that Levin developed combinations of electric shock and drug treatments for SADF conscripts that had been classified as "deviant." This included those who smoked marijuana or who were homosexual. Levin's work for the SADF, in which he used aversion therapy, became the subject of much scrutiny at the end of the apartheid era.

While working at Voortrekkerhoogte, Levin travelled to Greefswald, in an isolated region of northern South Africa, where he was the attending psychiatrist. The Greefswald military detention barracks had a "notorious reputation for the harsh treatment of conscripts," intended to cure conscripts of supposed vices and conscientious objections. Life in Greefswald has been described in detail by one of his former patients, Gordon Torr, in his 2014 novel, Kill Yourself and Count to 10.

In 2013, members of the Greefswald Facebook group followed Levin's 4-month long trial in Alberta, Canada and were overjoyed when he was found guilty. A Global New journalist interviewed some of the members who were then living in Australia, Denmark, among other countries. They still bear psychic scars from their Greefswald experiences, which some described as "torture". They said that they had called Greefswald "The Vault". Levin, whom they called "Bubbles" for his weight, was known for his "brutal authority to the young men." Many of them were only teenagers when they were traumatized at Greefswald and the "focus of their anger was Aubrey Levin."

From 1975 to 1981, Levin also worked at Addington Hospital in Durban and at Fort England Psychiatric Hospital in Grahamstown; now called Makhanda, Eastern Cape. He performed chemical castrations at the hospitals.

A 2014 Salon article said that up to 900 people, who had been involuntarily drafted into the South African army, many of them aged 16 to 24 years old, were "subjected to forced sexual reassignment surgeries" (SRS). Following these forced, invasive, and often incomplete SRS, for example, by removing male organs, those forced to go through the SRS, who could not afford the "expensive hormones" intended to "maintain their new sexual identities", were left without any further assistance. From 1971 to 1989, people characterized as homosexual were "submitted to chemical castrations and electric shock treatment" as an alleged cure for homosexuality.

=== Publications documenting Levin's role in the Aversion Project ===
In 1994, with the end of apartheid, South Africa's Truth and Reconciliation Commission (TRC) heard testimony regarding the controversial nature of The Aversion Project Levin ran while in the SADF, details of which were published in 1999. In the report he was referred to as the "Colonel."

In June 1997, the Health and Human Rights Project (HHRP) submitted its report to the TRC in which Levin was singled out as a key figure in the "torture" of gay men in the SADF. In an interview with The Guardian in 2000, Levin said that his aversion therapy only caused slight pain and all his patients wanted to be cured. The HHRC, a collaborative program, was established in 1997 by the University of Cape Town's School of Public Health and Family Medicine, where it is located, and the Cape Town-based NGO, the Trauma Centre for Survivors of Violence and Torture.

In October 1999, the 132-page report entitled "The Aversion Project: human rights abuses of gays and lesbians in the SADF by health workers during the apartheid era", funded by the Joseph Rowntree Charitable Trust and commissioned by South Africa's medical research council and human rights groups, was published.

In 2000, The Daily Mail and Guardian published a "chilling investigative series", including a July 2000 article published by The Guardian which provided details on the report. The same journalist also reported on Levin's sexual abuse trial in 2012 in Alberta, Canada. In an interview with The Guardian in 2000, Levin said that his aversion therapy only caused slight pain and all his patients wanted to be cured.

In March 2001, Robert M. Caplan published his article on the report in the South African Medical Journal (SAMJ). In it Levin was referred to as the Colonel. The report "detailed castration and electric shocks".

Starting in 2010, journalists in South Africa began to publish in-depth articles about Levin role during the apartheid era, providing a backdrop to charges brought against him in Canada. Headlines included "Dr Shock is in the dock", Terry Bell, the author of the 2003 non-fiction, Unfinished business: South Africa, apartheid, and truth, wrote an article entitled "In pursuit of 'Dr Shock'" in which he decried the way in which Levin had evaded justice in South Africa.

A 2014 AlterNet article, republished in Salon, listed the Aversion Project, which was undertaken in South-Africa during the apartheid era, as one of the top ten "most evil medical experiments".

In 2014, one of Levin's former patients, Gordon Torr, wrote a novel entitled Kill Yourself and Count to 10 about a fictional SADF conscript who was mistakenly thrust into a brutal reeducation program, run by a rogue psychiatrist who used the young men as his experimental toys. Torr based the novel on his own experience in the apartheid era Greefswald camp in the "Northern province where anyone considered unfit for the Nationalist army's Calvinist-scripted needs was sent for rehabilitation."

=== Saskatchewan, Canada ===
In 1995 Levin was working at the Fort England Hospital in Grahamstown, when he learned that the Truth and Reconciliation Commission (TRC) report had named him as one of the abusers of human rights. His successor said that Levin had "left in such a hurry" that he did not pack his office". His belongings had to be sent by post to Saskatchewan, Canada where he had emigrated. He said that his reason for emigrating was "only because of the high crime rate" in South Africa and he "denied the accusations against him."

In 1995, the College of Physicians and Surgeons of Saskatchewan, Canada gave Levin a licence to practice in Saskatchewan.

In Saskatoon, Saskatchewan, Levin was for a short time the Regional Psychiatric Centre's regional director.

In the late 1990s, the TRC requested that Levin testify in South Africa to respond to the claims against him in the submission made by the Health and Human Rights Project (HHRP). Levin threatened legal action and refused to appear at the TRC hearings. The final TRC report did not identify Levin by name. He was referred to as a psychologist (not a psychiatrist) who "practiced aversion therapy".

== Alberta, Canada ==
In 1998 the HHRP sent a letter to the College of Physicians and Surgeons of Alberta (CPSA) in which they informed the CPSA of Levin's background. They did not receive any response. In the same year, the CPSA gave Levin a licence to work in the practice medicine in Alberta. He worked as a psychiatrist and academic in Alberta from 1998 until his licence was suspended in 2010. By 2000, Levin was working in a teaching hospital in Calgary, Alberta.

== Sexual assault charges ==
In March 2010, the College of Physicians and Surgeons of Alberta suspended Levin's license over accusations of abuse after a male patient secretly filmed the psychiatrist allegedly making sexual advances. By July 2010, 30 other men had come forward, claiming they were assaulted by Levin during counseling sessions, according to the police.

On 11 October 2012, Levin went to trial at the Court of Queen's Bench in Calgary. His legal defence had failed to convince a pre-trial hearing that Levin was mentally unfit to stand trial.

The Crown decided to go ahead with nine of the original 21 cases. During the trial, a jury was shown the graphic video of Levin touching a patient, which had been secretly recorded on the patient's [camera wristwatch].

On 28 January 2013, a jury found Levin guilty of three charges of sexual assault against male patients, not guilty of two other charges of sexual assault, while a mistrial was declared in reference to a further four counts. He was convicted of "sexual assaulting three of his patients between 2008 and 2010."

On 31 January 2013, Levin became a registered sex offender, as a result of the convictions. His registration requirements were due to last for 20 years.

A May 2013 CBC article questioned how "justice officials, the academic community" and the Colleges of Physicians and Surgeons had not been aware of Levin's history. A crown prosecutor said that the right hand did not know what the left hand was doing.

=== Obstruction of justice ===
On 7 February 2013, police arrested Levin's wife Erica Levin, then aged 69, and charged her with obstruction of justice for alleging attempting to bribe a juror. The juror said she was approached on a train platform in January and offered $1,000 or $10,000 in a white envelope, to bring in a not-guilty verdict. The juror informed police and was subsequently dismissed. Although Court of Queen's Bench Justice Karen Horner said that Levin's actions were both "selfish" and "reckless", she considered Levin's plea of post-traumatic stress disorder and depression, and sentenced her to an "18-month conditional sentence with house arrest and 180 hours of community service."

=== Release on bail ===
Despite a 5-year prison sentence, Levin was released on $15,000 bail on 13 February 2013. The judge said that since his license to practice medicine has been suspended, he is "not a danger to the public."

=== Court of Appeal of Alberta ===
On 23 April 2014 the Court of Appeal of Alberta, in a unanimous decision, upheld the 2013 conviction. Levin was ordered to report, within 48 hours, to begin a five-year sentence at an unnamed institution.

=== Early release from prison ===
In 2016, CBC obtained information that the Parole Board of Canada had granted Levin day parole. By March 2016 he was living in a halfway house. The 76-year-old had requested full pardon. Levin told the Parole Board that the "victims lied and that the police and the courts...had it in for [him]". Assessments included a "scathing" psychological evaluation, and statements that Levin appeared to "have little concern for [his] victims, that he was "manipulative" and presented himself as "victim of the system." Levin denied that he had "any sexual motive or basis for your sexual offences" and that he was not "aware that what he was doing was a criminal act in Canada as it's allowed in his home country of South Africa."

On 1 February 2023, Levin applied for release from sex offender registration. Then aged 84, elderly, infirm, cognitively impaired, and allegedly unable to meet the physical registration requirements, Levin then of Vancouver was granted early termination when the Crown did not oppose.

== Death ==
Levin died in Toronto on 18 December 2025, his 87th birthday. He had been suffering from advanced Alzheimer's disease. His death was not publicly announced until September 2026.
