= Lakeland (electoral district) =

Federal electoral district in Alberta, Canada

Alberta electoral district
- Interactive map of riding boundaries from the 2025 federal election

Federal electoral district
- Legislature: House of Commons
MP
Shannon Stubbs
Conservative
- District created: 2013
- First contested: 2015
- Last contested: 2025
- District webpage: profile, map

Demographics
- Population (2016): 108,451
- Electors (2019): 78,525
- Area (km²): 31,877
- Pop. density (per km²): 3.4
- Census division(s): Division No. 10, Division No. 12, Division No. 13
- Census subdivision(s): Lloydminster (part), Bonnyville (part), Vermilion River, Athabasca County, Bonnyville, St. Paul County, St. Paul, Vegreville, Saddle Lake, Vermilion

Lakeland is a federal electoral district in Alberta, Canada, that was represented in the House of Commons of Canada from 1997 to 2004, and again since 2015. Its name is derived from the area's topography (and the former Lakeland County). The district's largest communities are Bonnyville, St. Paul, and the Alberta part of Lloydminster.

== History ==
The district was created in 1996 from the Beaver River and Vegreville ridings. It was abolished in 2003, with parts transferred to Vegreville—Wainwright and Westlock—St. Paul. A small part was transferred to Athabasca.

The riding was re-created in 2013 from these same districts (Athabasca having been renamed to Fort McMurray—Athabasca) with a new set of boundaries, no longer including the northerly communities of Lac La Biche and Cold Lake, but extending further west to the towns of Athabasca and Waskatenau. It is largely a successor to Vegreville—Wainwright.

== Demographics ==
Its 2016 population was 108,451, a 3.7% increase from 2011.

Panethnic groups in Lakeland (2011−2021)
Panethnic group	2021		2016		2011	
Panethnic group	Pop.	%	Pop.	%	Pop.	%
European (Note: Statistic includes all persons that did not make up part of a visible minority or an indigenous identity.)	79,805	77.8%	84,920	80.49%	85,625	84.4%
Indigenous	16,165	15.76%	14,840	14.07%	13,105	12.92%
Southeast Asian (Note: Statistic includes total responses of "Filipino" and "Southeast Asian" under visible minority section on census.)	3,080	3%	2,165	2.05%	1,000	0.99%
South Asian	1,340	1.31%	1,055	1%	420	0.41%
African	750	0.73%	970	0.92%	330	0.33%
East Asian (Note: Statistic includes total responses of "Chinese", "Korean", and "Japanese" under visible minority section on census.)	515	0.5%	625	0.59%	400	0.39%
Latin American	370	0.36%	325	0.31%	200	0.2%
Middle Eastern (Note: Statistic includes total responses of "West Asian" and "Arab" under visible minority section on census.)	330	0.32%	390	0.37%	190	0.19%
Other/multiracial (Note: Statistic includes total responses of "Visible minority, n.i.e." and "Multiple visible minorities" under visible minority section on census.)	235	0.23%	215	0.2%	180	0.18%
Total responses	102,580	96.78%	105,505	97.08%	101,450	96.97%
Total population	105,993	100%	108,677	100%	104,616	100%
Notes: Totals greater than 100% due to multiple origin responses. Demographics based on 2012 Canadian federal electoral redistribution riding boundaries.

== Members of Parliament ==
This riding has elected the following members of the House of Commons of Canada:

Parliament	Years	Member	Party
Lakeland; Riding created from Beaver River and Vegreville
36th	1997–2000 (Note: The Reform Party merged with the Canadian Alliance on 27 March 2000.)	Leon Benoit	Reform
36th	2000–2000	Leon Benoit	Alliance
37th	2000–2003 (Note: The Canadian Alliance merged with the Progressive Conservatives to form the Conservative Party on 8 December 2003.)	Leon Benoit	Alliance
37th	2003–2004	Leon Benoit	Conservative
Riding dissolved into Athabasca, Vegreville—Wainwright, and Westlock—St. Paul
Riding re-created from Fort McMurray—Athabasca, Vegreville—Wainwright, and Westlock—St. Paul
42nd	2015–2019	Shannon Stubbs	Conservative
43rd	2019–2021	Shannon Stubbs	Conservative
44th	2021–2025	Shannon Stubbs	Conservative
45th	2025–present	Shannon Stubbs	Conservative

In addition, Senator Martha Bielish designated "Lakeland" as her Senate division, representing the area as a Progressive Conservative from 1979 to 1990. She was Alberta's first female Senator.

== Election results ==
=== 2015–present ===
Graph of election results in Lakeland (since 2013, minor parties that never got 2% of the vote or didn't run consistently are omitted)

2025 Canadian federal election
Party	Candidate	Votes	%	±%	Expenditures
Conservative	Shannon Stubbs	45,826	80.98	+11.58	$98,590.06
Liberal	Barry Milaney	6,886	12.17	+7.21	$2,165.27
New Democratic	Des Bissonnette	2,153	3.80	–6.71	$759.80
People's	Michael Manchen	982	1.74	–9.33	$8,126.64
Green	Bridget Burns	411	0.73	–0.15	none listed
Christian Heritage	Micheal Speirs	335	0.59	–	$2,245.57
Total valid votes/expense limit		56,593	99.62	–	$143,971.04
Total rejected ballots		216	0.38	–0.05	
Turnout		56,809	69.64	+2.75	
Eligible voters		81,581			
Conservative hold		Swing		+10.46	
Source: Elections Canada

2021 federal election redistributed results
Party	Vote	%
Conservative	36,405	69.40
People's	5,802	11.06
New Democratic	5,511	10.51
Liberal	2,604	4.96
Green	463	0.88
Others	1,671	3.19

2021 Canadian federal election
Party	Candidate	Votes	%	±%	Expenditures
Conservative	Shannon Stubbs	36,557	69.43	–14.48	$46,708.11
People's	Ann McCormack	5,827	11.07	+8.52	$15,179.04
New Democratic	Des Bissonnette	5,519	10.48	+4.01	$1,217.51
Liberal	John Turvey	2,610	4.96	+0.50	none listed
Maverick	Fred Sirett	1,674	3.18	–	$8,694.07
Green	Kira Brunner	464	0.88	–1.04	none listed
Total valid votes/expense limit		52,651	99.57	–	$124,350.72
Total rejected ballots		229	0.43	+0.09	
Turnout		52,880	66.89	–4.81	
Eligible voters		79,059			
Conservative hold		Swing		–11.50	
Source: Elections Canada

2019 Canadian federal election
Party	Candidate	Votes	%	±%	Expenditures
Conservative	Shannon Stubbs	48,314	83.91	+11.11	$62,299.17
New Democratic	Jeffrey Swanson	3,728	6.48	–3.59	none listed
Liberal	Mark Watson	2,565	4.46	–9.24	$1,657.78
People's	Alain Houle	1,468	2.55	–	$7,186.92
Green	Kira Brunner	1,105	1.92	–0.42	none listed
Libertarian	Robert George McFadzean	251	0.44	–0.66	none listed
Veterans Coalition	Roberta Marie Graham	147	0.26	–	none listed
Total valid votes/expense limit		57,578	99.66	–	$121,089.40
Total rejected ballots		198	0.34	+0.06	
Turnout		57,776	71.70	+2.79	
Eligible voters		80,578			
Conservative hold		Swing		+7.35	
Source: Elections Canada

2015 Canadian federal election
Party	Candidate	Votes	%	±%	Expenditures
Conservative	Shannon Stubbs	39,882	72.81	–6.19	$96,950.81
Liberal	Garry Parenteau	7,500	13.69	+8.59	$5,761.06
New Democratic	Duane Zaraska	5,513	10.06	–1.16	$8,006.40
Green	Danielle Montgomery	1,283	2.34	–1.88	none listed
Libertarian	Robert George McFadzean	601	1.10	–	$1,653.97
Total valid votes/expense limit		54,779	99.72	–	$242,495.35
Total rejected ballots		155	0.28	–	
Turnout		54,934	68.91	–	
Eligible voters		79,721			
Conservative notional hold		Swing		–7.39	
Source: Elections Canada

2011 federal election redistributed results
Party	Vote	%
Conservative	32,529	78.99
New Democratic	4,621	11.22
Liberal	2,100	5.10
Green	1,740	4.23
Others	191	0.46

=== 1997–2004 ===
Graph of election results in Lakeland (1996-2003, minor parties that never got 2% of the vote or didn't run consistently are omitted)

2000 Canadian federal election
Party	Candidate	Votes	%	±%	Expenditures
Alliance	Leon Benoit	29,348	65.45	+6.17	$46,423
Liberal	Wayne Kowalski	9,050	20.18	+2.53	$40,607
Progressive Conservative	Paul Pelletier	4,373	9.75	–8.06	$4,991
New Democratic	Ray Stone	2,069	4.61	+0.18	$3,570
Total valid votes		44,840	99.71		
Total rejected ballots		132	0.29	+0.04	
Turnout		44,972	63.65	+7.04	
Eligible voters		70,660			
Alliance hold		Swing		+1.82	
Source: Elections Canada

1997 Canadian federal election
Party	Candidate	Votes	%	±%	Expenditures
Reform	Leon Benoit	23,214	59.28	–	$46,821
Progressive Conservative	Les Parsons	6,976	17.82	–	$29,332
Liberal	Hansa Thaleshvar	6,911	17.65	–	$27,199
New Democratic	John Williams	1,737	4.44	–	$992
Independent	Valerie Doreen Morrow	321	0.82	–	$5,106
Total valid votes		39,159	99.75		
Total rejected ballots		97	0.25	–	
Turnout		39,256	56.61	–	
Eligible voters		69,339			
Reform notional gain		Swing		–	
Source: Elections Canada

== See also ==
- List of Canadian electoral districts
- Historical federal electoral districts of Canada
