= Alberta Medical Association =

Organization of physicians in Alberta, Canada

- Abbreviation: AMA
- Predecessor: North West Territories Medical Association (1889); Canadian Medical Association, Alberta Division (1906); Alberta Medical Association (1960s-present)
- Formation: 1906; 120 years ago
- Founded at: Alberta, Canada
- Type: Organizations based in Alberta
- Legal status: active
- Purpose: Advocacy on provincial health and medical matters
- Region served: Alberta, Canada
- President: Dr. Shelley Duggan
- Website: https://www.albertadoctors.org/

The Alberta Medical Association (AMA) is a provincial affiliate of the Canadian Medical Association, established in 1889 in the Canadian province of Alberta. It describes itself as an "advocate for its physician members, providing leadership and support for their role in the provision of quality health care".

The Alberta Medical Association was formed in 1906, as the Canadian Medical Association, Alberta Division and serves as the College of Physicians and Surgeons of Alberta. It was predated by the North West Territories Medical Association founded in 1889 at a Canadian Medical Association meeting at Banff. The association supported prepaid health insurance in the 1940s, and its advocacy helped bring about the government-created Medical Services (Alberta) Incorporated. The group's name was formally changed to the Alberta Medical Association in the 1960s.

== Mandate and mission ==
It describes itself as an "advocate for its physician members, providing leadership and support for their role in the provision of quality health care".

== Affiliations ==
The Alberta Medical Association (AMA) collaborates closely with a number of health partners in Alberta to support physician practice and health system improvement.

It is a provincial affiliate of the Canadian Medical Association, is a national, voluntary association of physicians that advocates on behalf of physicians and their patients on key health issues.

One key partnership is with Alberta Health, the provincial government department responsible for setting policy and allocating health care funding. Through this affiliation, the AMA contributes to policy development and advocates for sustainable, patient-centered care models.

The AMA also supports clinical transformation through the Accelerating Change Transformation Team (ACTT), a joint initiative with Alberta Health and Alberta Health Services (AHS). The ACTT team focuses on enabling system-wide improvements in primary care delivery, continuity, and team-based care.

In addition, the AMA is involved in the province's EMR (Electronic Medical Record) network, which promotes interoperability and quality improvement across clinical settings. The EMR network includes several certified platforms in use across Alberta, such as:

- Ava EMR
- Accuro
- Collaborative Health Record (CHR)
- Healthquest
- Med Access
- PS Suite

These systems support the secure exchange of health information and align with broader provincial initiatives to improve data integration and care coordination across the continuum of care.

== Background ==
At an 1889 Canadian Medical Association meeting held in Banff, Alberta the North West Territories Medical Association was founded.

In 1906, the Canadian Medical Association, Alberta Division was formed, as the College of Physicians and Surgeons of Alberta.

In the 1960s, the organization changed its name to the Alberta Medical Association (AMA).
