= Whitefish Lake 128 =

Coordinates: 54°18′49″N 111°48′14″W

- Indian reserve
- Whitefish Lake Indian Reserve No. 128
- Location in Alberta
- First Nation: Saddle Lake Cree
- Treaty: 6
- Country: Canada
- Province: Alberta
- Municipal districts: Smoky Lake; St. Paul

Area
  - Total: 4,542.7 ha (11,225 acres)

Population (2016)
  - Total: 1,310
  - Density: 28.8/km^{2} (74.7/sq mi)
- Time zone: UTC−06:00 (Alberta Time)
- Website: https://wfl128.ca/

Whitefish Lake 128 is an Indian reserve of the Saddle Lake Cree Nation in Alberta, located between Smoky Lake County and the County of St. Paul No. 19. The central location of the reserve is where the main adminstraion of the nation is located and is also called Goodfish Lake, which it is often referred to as. It is 68 kilometres west of Bonnyville. In the 2016 Canadian Census, it recorded a population of 1,310 living in 291 of its 319 total private dwellings.

Among its residents was Indigenous leader and Methodist missionary Henry Bird Steinhauer who lived here 1855-1875.
