= Gordon Torr =

South African creative director and author

- Born: 17 October 1953 (age 72); Natal, South Africa
- Writing career
- Pen name: Leyland Torr
- Genre: Nonfiction
- Website: Official website

Gordon Torr (born 17 October 1953) is a former Global Creative Director of JWT, and author of Managing Creative People: Lessons for Leadership in the Ideas Economy (2008), published by John Wiley & Sons. His second novel, Kill Yourself and Count to 10, about his time at Greefswald, the hard labour camp created by convicted sex offender Aubrey Levin, was published in May 2014.

== Biography ==
Educated in Natal, South Africa, Torr covered the 1976 Soweto Riots as a journalist for the SABC, taught at St Joseph’s Minor Seminary in Lesotho, and was employed as a copywriter by Grey Advertising & Marketing in 1980. Torr joined the Johannesburg office of JWT in 1985. He spent three years as Creative Director of JWT Mexico, based in Mexico City, before transferring to London as Global Creative Director of De Beers and, subsequently, of Diageo, Kellogg’s and Vodafone. He was appointed Chair of the Worldwide Creative Council of JWT in 2003.

Torr lives in the UK with his family and is currently writing several books.

== Books ==
=== Non fiction ===
- 2008: Managing Creative People: Lessons for Leadership in the Ideas Economy
- 2011: Managing Creative People: Lessons in Leadership for the Ideas Economy
- 2019: Skip ad in 5 The AD Blockers guide to Brand planning

=== Novels ===
- 2010: The Turing Test (under the nom de plume of Leyland Torr)
- 2014: Kill Yourself and Count to 10, Penguin South Africa
