= Carl Quinn =

Cree First Nations singer-songwriter

- Origin: Alberta, Canada
- Genres: Pop; rock; pow-wow; electronica
- Occupation: Singer-songwriter

Carl Quinn is a Cree First Nations singer-songwriter from the Saddle Lake First Nation in Alberta. He is also a traditional pow-wow dancer and sings with the Pisimoyapi drum group, since their inception. Throughout his music career Quinn has developed a genre in which he self-described as "New World" and that can be identified by its assortment of pop, rock, pow-wow, and electronica. He has released three albums focused on life, love, tradition and values, all of which he sang in his Native Cree (Nehiyo) language. In 2003, Quinn was awarded the Best Traditional Album, Contemporary Award at the Canadian Aboriginal Music Awards (CAMAs) for his Nehiyo Album and in 2005 at the CAMAs he was awarded the best songwriter for "Ni Ototem" and "Otapihkes" which were both from his Ni Ototem album.

== History ==
Carl Quinn is one son from a family of twelve and he was born on the Saddle Lake Cree Nation in a dirt-floored one room shack. Although, throughout his life he has experienced being a hunter, trapper, farm hand, construction worker, and a human resource consultant, he is best known for being a leader in his community by becoming the youngest Chief ever to be elected on the Saddle Lake reserve and even greater known by becoming a great musical inspiration upon his people. The musical influences Quinn originally grew up with were the songs of the traditional ceremony, round dance, handgame, and pow-wow of his Cree heritage. When receiving his first guitar at fifteen Quinn began emulating music of the folk and rock sound from the late sixties and early seventies. Quinn eventually started writing his own music that combined sounds from his musical influences, citing Creedence Clearwater Revival, The Beatles, Dwight Yoakam, and his traditional musical background.

== Discography ==
Albums

- Ni Ototem (unknown)
- Nehiyo (Copyrighted by Pisimoyapi Productions 2003, arranged by Tomas Brabec and Carl Quinn, released January 18, 2005)
1. Nosisim
2. Kisenapew
3. Ka Sipihkosit Atahkos (a song about the resiliency of the"Nehiyo" and the assault on the "Nehiyo" identity)
4. Nipin (a summer song meant to be lively and fun)
5. Pakamapiskwewin (a song about golf from a humorous perspective)
6. Kiwihtamawin
7. Kise-Yotin
8. Sakastew
9. Takawakin Awasis
- Nimosom (2007)
1. Ahaw
2. Akitah
3. Awasis
4. Iyiniw
5. Meena
6. Nehiyo
7. Nemakikwiy
8. Newayak
9. Nimosom
10. Nipahwih
11. Nitanis
12. Nohta
13. O Kistin
14. Onitopayo
15. Otapihkes
16. Pisimoyapi
17. Sakihitwask

== Videos ==
- "Nipin – Carl Quinn". YouTube. February 1, 2008.
- "Carl Quinn". YouTube. July 3, 2008.
