= Peter Stefura =

Canadian politician (1923–1982)

Member of Parliament for Vegreville
- In office 1957–1958
- Preceded by: John Decore
- Succeeded by: Frank Fane

Personal details
- Born: February 13, 1923 Chipman, Alberta, Canada
- Died: August 16, 1982 (aged 59) Camrose, Alberta, Canada
- Party: Progressive Conservative
- Spouse(s): Lois Winona Mitchell (m. 5 May 1950 – 16 Aug 1982; his death)
- Children: three
- Profession: farmer

Peter Stefura (February 13, 1923 – August 16, 1982) was a farmer, a municipal councilor and Reeve (both in Lamont, Alberta) and served as a Canadian federal politician from 1957 to 1958.

Stefura first ran for a seat in the House of Commons of Canada in the 1957 federal election. He defeated 4 other candidates to win in Vegreville. Parliament was dissolved 1 year later and he ran for re-election in the 1958 federal election but was defeated by Progressive Conservative Frank Fane, whom Stefura had defeated nine months earlier. Stefura attempted to win his seat and defeat Fane in the 1962 federal election but was not successful.

He died at St. Mary's Hospital in Camrose in 1982.
