= Medical Services (Alberta) Incorporated =

Medical Services (Alberta) Incorporated (MSI) was a prepaid medicare plan in the Canadian province of Alberta prior to the advent of Canadian medicare. Membership in the plan was optional, and it did not provide coverage for all Albertans.

The plan was established by the College of Physicians and Surgeons of Alberta in 1948, and it offered medical, surgical and obstetrical services to subscribers. It was superseded by the national medicare program in 1969.
