= College of Physicians and Surgeons of Alberta =

Regulatory college for doctors in Alberta, Canada

- Formation: 1905
- Type: Regulatory college
- Region served: Alberta
- Website: www.cpsa.ca

The College of Physicians & Surgeons of Alberta (CPSA) is a regulatory college in the Canadian province of Alberta. Its stated purpose is to "register physicians and issue medical practice permits, develop and administer standards of practice and conduct, and investigate and resolve physician-related complaints". CPSA also "provides leadership and direction on health and related policy issues".

The organization was formed in Calgary in 1905.

== Background ==
While still part of the Northwest Territories, the NWT Medical Ordinance regulated the medical profession in the geographic regions that became the provinces of Alberta and Saskatchewan. Dr. James D. Lafferty served as NWT Medical Ordinance registrar from 1901 until 1905.

On July 20, 1905, the Parliament of Canada passed the Alberta Act through which Alberta became a province of the Dominion of Canada. According to the Alberta Act, existing societies or associations that regulated the medical profession, dentistry, pharmaceutical chemistry and others, under the Northwest Territories (NWT) Medical Ordinance, were dissolved.

On May 9, 1906, the Alberta Medical Profession Act was passed in the newly formed Alberta legislature. Lafferty had drafted the medical acts for both newly formed provinces—Alberta and Saskatchewan.

In 1906, the College of Physicians and Surgeons of Alberta (CPSA) was founded in Calgary. The Canadian Medical Association's Alberta Division was formed later in the same year. The Alberta Division is now known as the Alberta Medical Association. AMA served as the educational body that also worked collaboratively with CPSA on issues such as standards of medical care.

On October 18, 1906, the newly elected Medical Council of Alberta appointed Lafferty as registrar. Dr. William A. Lincoln became a member of the Alberta Medical Association and was appointed secretary-treasurer in 1908.

== Disciplinary hearings ==
The case of Aubrey Levin attracted international media attention, following the suspension of Levin's license by CPSA in March 2010. Levin, who has been identified as an alleged abuser of human rights for his role as Chief psychiatrist and team leader at South African Defence Force (SADF)'s drug rehabilitation program near Pretoria in the 1970s, was "convicted of sexual assaulting three of his patients [in Alberta] between 2008 and 2010." South Africa's post apartheid era, Truth and Reconciliation Commission (TRC), had investigated the controversial nature of an SADF project that Levin ran while he was an SADF Colonel—The Aversion Project. Levin emigrated to Canada in the late 1990s and refused to return to testify before the TRC. Levin denied that he had "any sexual motive or basis for [his] sexual offences" and that he was not "aware that what he was doing was a criminal act in Canada as it's allowed in his home country of South Africa."

On October 16, 2020, Wynand Wessels, a white orthopedic surgeon, told a CPSA disciplinary hearing that he had "tied a noose and taped it to the door" of an operating room at Queen Elizabeth II Hospital Grande Prairie, Alberta on June 24, 2016. Wessels denied that the noose had targeted a black surgical assistant—originally from Nigeria—who worked in that operating room. Wessels said that he grew up in South Africa during the apartheid era without a free press, and was not aware of the racial connotations associated with the noose and lynching in North America. Those interviewed for a July 3, 2020 CBC News report said that the incident had been reported in June 2014, and complaints made since then, but CPSA, the Alberta Health Services (AHS), and Tyler Shandro, Alberta's health minister had not followed through. On December 6, 2021, Wessels was found guilty of unprofessional conduct by an independent hearings tribunal and handed a 4-month suspension.
