= The Aversion Project =

Medical torture program in South Africa active during the apartheid era

The Aversion Project was a medical torture programme in South Africa led by Aubrey Levin during apartheid. The project identified gay soldiers and conscripts who used drugs in the South African Defence Forces (SADF). Victims were forced to submit to "curing" their homosexuality because the SADF considered homosexuality to be subversive, and those who were homosexual were subject to punishment. In 1995, the South African Medical Association issued a public apology for past wrongdoings.

== History ==
Under apartheid, there was a dual policy on homosexuality in the South African military. Permanent members of the military were prohibited from being homosexual, while it was allowed for conscripts. Officials believed that completely banning homosexuality from the military would give a specific group of individuals – young, white South African men – a convenient way to avoid serving in the military. However, with the supposed toleration of homosexuality came forced 'therapy,' such as compulsion shock therapy, castration, and other forms of 'therapy', which were said to significantly violate basic human rights.

Between 1971 and 1989, victims were submitted to chemical castration and electric aversion treatment meant to cure them of their homosexuality. This trend was supported by psychiatrists who believed homosexuals were mentally ill, a claim stated in the American Psychiatric Association's Diagnostic and Statistical Manual of Mental Disorders. Conscripts with this proclaimed 'mental illness' were treated differently than other members of the military. They were not given military leadership positions, and they were not entrusted with sensitive information.

During the course of the shock therapy, treatment electrodes were strapped to the upper arm with wires, then run through a dial calibrated from 1 to 10, varying the current. Homosexual soldiers were shown black-and-white pictures of a naked man and were encouraged to fantasize, at which point the person in charge would administer a shock if the soldiers showed any form of sexual response. The voltage was increased throughout the treatment if the soldiers continued to exhibit sexual responses. The patient would then be shown a coloured picture of a woman, which was supposed to stimulate arousal. However, more often than not, this failed.

As a result of these failures, there is also evidence that sexual realignment procedures took place on the people who were unable to be 'cured.' Due to the lack of scientific evidence to prove that these procedures have the ability to alter sexuality, they began declining in frequency during the 1970s, when treatment for homosexual soldiers was no longer supported by the field of mental health. Consequently, the definition of homosexuals as mentally ill was removed from the American Psychiatric Association's manual in 1973, and the treatment was left behind.

== The Aversion Research Project ==
The Aversion Research Project was formed by a team of academic researchers and activists who came together in order to obtain more information about the treatment of homosexual military personnel during the Apartheid era. This was a research project based on qualitative methodology, further examining why homosexuality was considered to be unusual behaviour at that time. Homosexual individuals who were targets of the conversion therapy, along with their families and friends, were interviewed in order to obtain in-depth, first-hand experiences of those directly impacted.

Prior to the project, the researchers had to be approved by a research committee. The research committee, however, took issue with the use of the word 'abuse' as a way of describing what happened to homosexual military personnel. The research committee believed that considering the conversion 'therapy' to be abuse was only an assumption unsupported by factual evidence.

Therefore, the term 'abuse', when used in the research project, had to be supported with factual evidence. Additionally, the research ethics committee did not agree with the researchers' designation of the actions of psychologists initiating this conversion shock therapy as a human rights violation. This raised concerns about the research project, as the committee clearly did not want this to be an investigation into the practices of medical officials involved in the military. Furthermore, the committee questioned the sampling methods of the researchers. Because researchers would be accepting volunteers, the committee found that the sampling method used would not be representative of the experience as a whole.

== Aubrey Levin ==
Aubrey Levin was the leader of the project against homosexual military personnel. He argued that the same type of procedures could cure other groups, such as drug addicts and the "disturbed" (those who did not want to serve in the apartheid military). He started the project and then ran Ward 22 at 1 Military Hospital, in Voortrekkerhoogte, which is where the majority of the patients were treated. He was one of 24 other doctors that were warned by the Truth and Reconciliation Commission (South Africa) that what they were doing was a violation of human rights, and that they risked being labelled as perpetrators of human rights abuses. Levin claimed that all patients were volunteers. Since then, Levin has been accused of several more instances of medical foul practice, targeting many other men (not only those who identified as homosexual). He was sentenced to a five-year prison term on April 23, 2014.

== Post-project ==
After it became noticeable that conversion therapy was failing, staff came up with an alternative. As a result, patients who had failed the initial treatment were subjected to a sex change. This included being put through surgery and being given a new identity. Patients would then be discharged from the military and advised to cut themselves off from family and friends. As many as 900 homosexuals, mostly 16 to 24-year-olds who had been drafted, were subjected to surgical procedures to alter their genitals and given birth certificates to fit their modified anatomy. This surgery was done in military hospitals, and a high rate of patients died during surgery. Additionally, the reassignments were often left incomplete, leaving patients with halfway-finished procedures. After being discharged, there were no follow-up appointments to complete the surgeries or check on patients' mental and physical health. Without adequate mental preparation for such a significant personal change, patients also faced depression, leading many to commit suicide.
