= Saddle Lake 125 =

Coordinates: 53°58′15″N 111°41′15″W

Saddle Lake Cree Nation 125
- Indian reserve
- Saddle Lake Indian Reserve No. 125
- Boundaries of Saddle Lake 125

- Location in Alberta
- First Nation: Saddle Lake
- Treaty: 6
- Country: Canada
- Province: Alberta
- Municipal districts: Smoky Lake; St. Paul

Area
  - Total: 25,780.6 ha (63,705 acres)
- Time zone: UTC−06:00 (Alberta Time)
- Website: https://slcn125.ca

Saddle Lake 125 is an Indian reserve of the Saddle Lake Cree Nation in Alberta, located between Smoky Lake County and the County of St. Paul No. 19. It is 24 kilometres west of St. Paul.

Uniquely in Alberta, the Saddle Lake Cree Nation did not give permission for Statistics Canada to enter Saddle Lake 125 during the 2016 Canadian Census, and the reserve went unenumerated.
