= Michael Luchkovich =

Canadian politician

- Михайло Лучкович
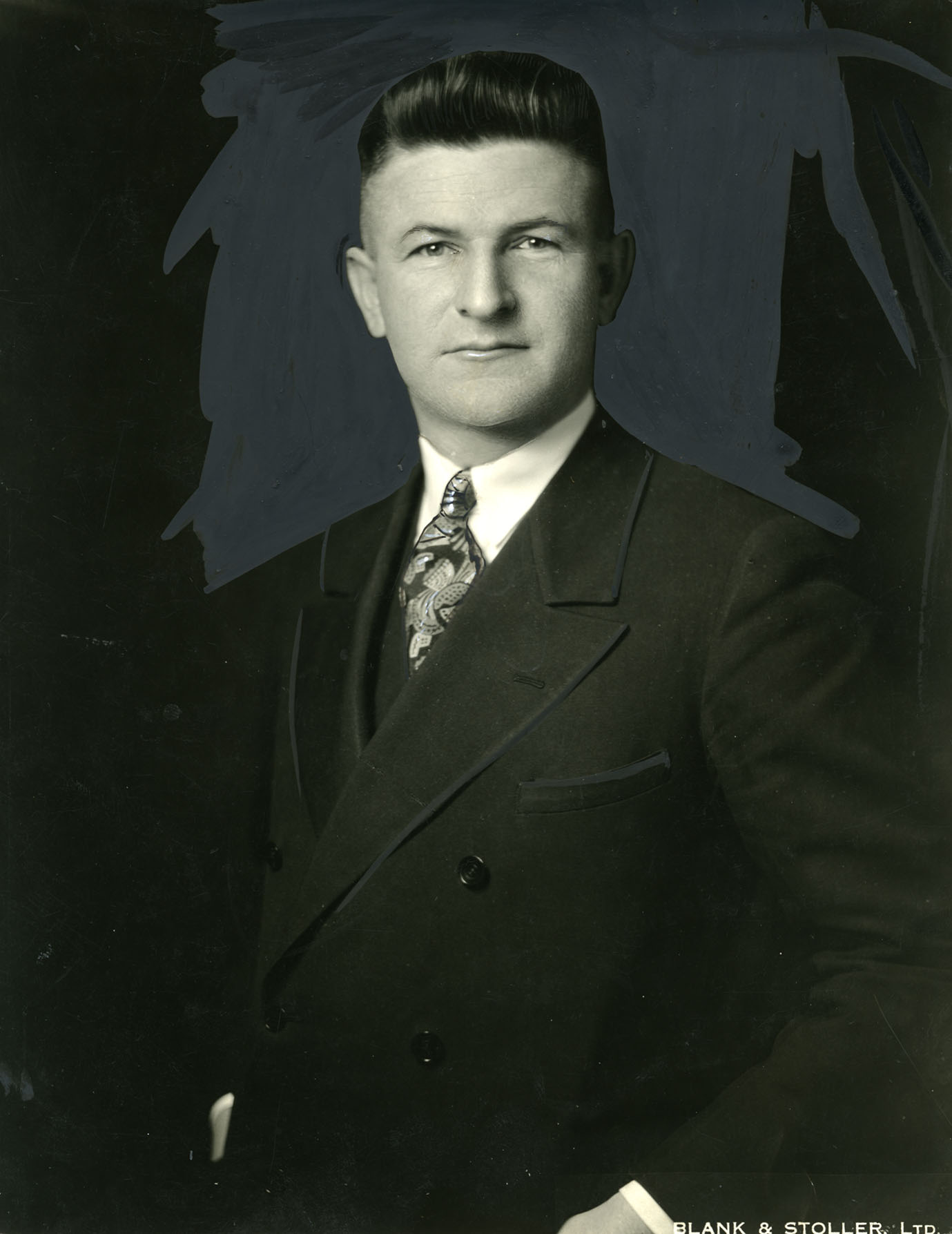

Member of Parliament for Vegreville
- In office September 14, 1926 – October 13, 1935
- Preceded by: Arthur Moren Boutillier
- Succeeded by: William Hayhurst

Personal details
- Born: November 13, 1892 Shamokin, Pennsylvania, United States
- Died: April 21, 1973 (aged 80) Edmonton, Alberta, Canada
- Party: United Farmers; Co-operative Commonwealth
- Occupation: Teacher

Michael Luchkovich (Note: Ukrainian: Михайло Лучкович, romanized: Mykhailo Luchkovych) (November 13, 1892 – April 21, 1973) was a Canadian politician. He was the first person of Ukrainian origin to be elected to the Parliament of Canada.

== Early life ==
Luchkovich's parents, Ephraim and Maria, emigrated from Nova Vis' in Austrian Galicia to Shamokin, Pennsylvania, where Ephraim worked as a miner and saloon owner and where Michael was born. Shamokin had a politically and culturally active community, and in 1894 the Ruthenian National Association was formed there. Luchkovich's parents spoke the Lemko dialect and his older sisters also learned standard Ukrainian, but he himself spoke English almost exclusively, and worked outside the home preparing tobacco for cigars. Two of his older sisters emigrated to Canada to become teachers in one-room schools in Manitoba, and he followed them there.

Luchkovich attended high school at Manitoba College in Winnipeg and then began studying at the University of Manitoba. There he began learning the Ukrainian language and history from Winnipeg's Ukrainian community, and began teaching part-time. In 1912 he advertised himself as a teacher in the Ukrainian-language newspapers and was recruited by the trustees of Svoboda School near Lamont, Alberta. He continued to work seasonally in Alberta and study in Winnipeg until 1916 when he graduated with an honours Bachelor of Arts degree in political science. In 1917 he enrolled at the Calgary Normal School, where he earned his qualifications as a teacher. He taught three years in New Kiew, Alberta, then became principal of the Michael Hrushewsky Institute, a bursa for Ukrainian high school and university students in Edmonton. He later returned to teaching in rural schools.

== Political career ==
In 1926, Luchkovich was approached by a committee of leaders in the Ukrainian community to stand as the United Farmers of Alberta candidate in the district of Vegreville in that year's federal election. The other contestants for the nomination were the incumbent Member of Parliament, Arthur Boutillier and another Ukrainian-backed candidate, Peter Miskew. Miskew was dropped after the first ballot and endorsed Luchkovich, who won the nomination by only three votes. Despite a limited campaign budget and religious and ethnic factionalism in the riding, he defeated Joseph McCallum, a former MLA for the area, by 700 votes, thus becoming the first person of Ukrainian descent to be elected to the Parliament of Canada. He became a national spokesman for Canada's 200,000 Ukrainians, speaking against discrimination. In 1928 he gave an impassioned speech haranguing nativists like Bishop Lloyd and the National Association of Canada over rumors about a non-existent petition supposedly circulating in the Ukrainian community protesting Canada's discriminatory immigration laws. Parliamentary and media opinion was impressed by Luchkovich's speech and the episode marked the high point of anti-Ukrainian rhetoric, which then subsided. While in Parliament, he continued to work part-time as a rural school teacher, sleeping in small teacherages.

He was re-elected in the 1930 election over Liberal challenger Charles Gordon by 1,010 votes. On May 8, 1931, Luchkovich gave a memorable speech criticizing the treatment of the Ukrainian minority by the Second Polish Republic and asking Canada to intervene. It was the first time the treatment of Ukrainians abroad had ever been broached in Parliament. The House agreed to recommend that the League of Nations investigate. He was named the sole delegate from the British Commonwealth to the International Inter-Parliamentary Union Congress in Bucharest and across Europe including the Ukrainian-majority areas of Rumania and Poland.

He was a founding member of the Co-operative Commonwealth Federation and ran under its banner in the 1935 election, but was defeated by Social Credit candidate William Hayhurst.

== Later life ==
After his defeat Luchkovich started and then quit law school, and worked for some time as a labourer. In 1944 he opened a grocery store which operated for fifteen years. In 1946 the Ukrainian Canadian Committee asked him to prepare a brief to the Commons Standing Committee on Immigration and Labour arguing for the admission of Ukrainian displaced persons to Canada.

== Published works and honors ==
Luchkovich was a writer and translator of Ukrainian literature into English. He translated One of the Fifteen Million by Nicholas Prychodko, which made the Toronto Star's list of best books of 1952 and was added to the Alberta school curriculum, and also translated Sons of the Soil by Ilya Kiriak. He wrote columns for Canadian Farmer, Ukrainian Voice, Svoboda, Western News, the Edmonton Journal, and the Calgary Herald where he argued for multiculturalism in Canada and for Ukrainian independence from the Soviet Union. He edited Their Land, an anthology of Ukrainian short stories, and wrote two autobiographical works: A Ukrainian Canadian in Parliament (Toronto : Ukrainian Canadian Research Foundation, 1965. 128 p.) and My Memoirs, 1892-1962. (s.l . : s.n., 1963?. 204 leaves).

The Michael Luchkovich Scholarships For Career Development are named in his honor and awarded three times each year. An award in his name was created in 1986 and is given annually to Alberta parliamentarians of Ukrainian descent who perform exemplary public service.
