= Edmonton Normal School =

- Type: trained primary and secondary school teachers
- Active: 1920–1945
- Location: Edmonton, Alberta, Canada

The Edmonton Normal School was an institution that trained primary and secondary school teachers in Alberta from 1920 to 1945, with two interruptions.

The normal school in Edmonton was Alberta's third. Alberta's first normal school was opened in Calgary in 1906, just after the province was created, and the second was opened in 1912 in Camrose. By 1919 the province hoped to expand teacher education by adding a third school in Edmonton. The new Edmonton Normal School subsequently opened in 1920 and used Highlands School as its home until a new facility was acquired in 1921. However, by 1923 the institution was forced to close due to lack of funds.

In 1928 it reopened in the premises of the new King Edward School, and in 1930 the school moved into a new purpose-built facility on the grounds of the University of Alberta, now known as Corbett Hall. The Great Depression, and the subsequent crisis in public finances, again disrupted the school, and it was closed from 1933 to 1935. From 1941 to 1945 the school shared the south wing of Corbett Hall with the Royal Canadian Air Force as part of the British Commonwealth Air Training Plan. This was the location of No. 4 Initial Training School.

In 1945 all normal schools in Alberta were merged into the University of Alberta's Faculty of Education. The faculty subsequently used Corbett Hall until 1962, before moving to the current Education Building. Corbett Hall has been used by several other faculties since that time.
