= Shannon Stubbs =

Canadian politician (born 1979)

Shannon Stubbs MP
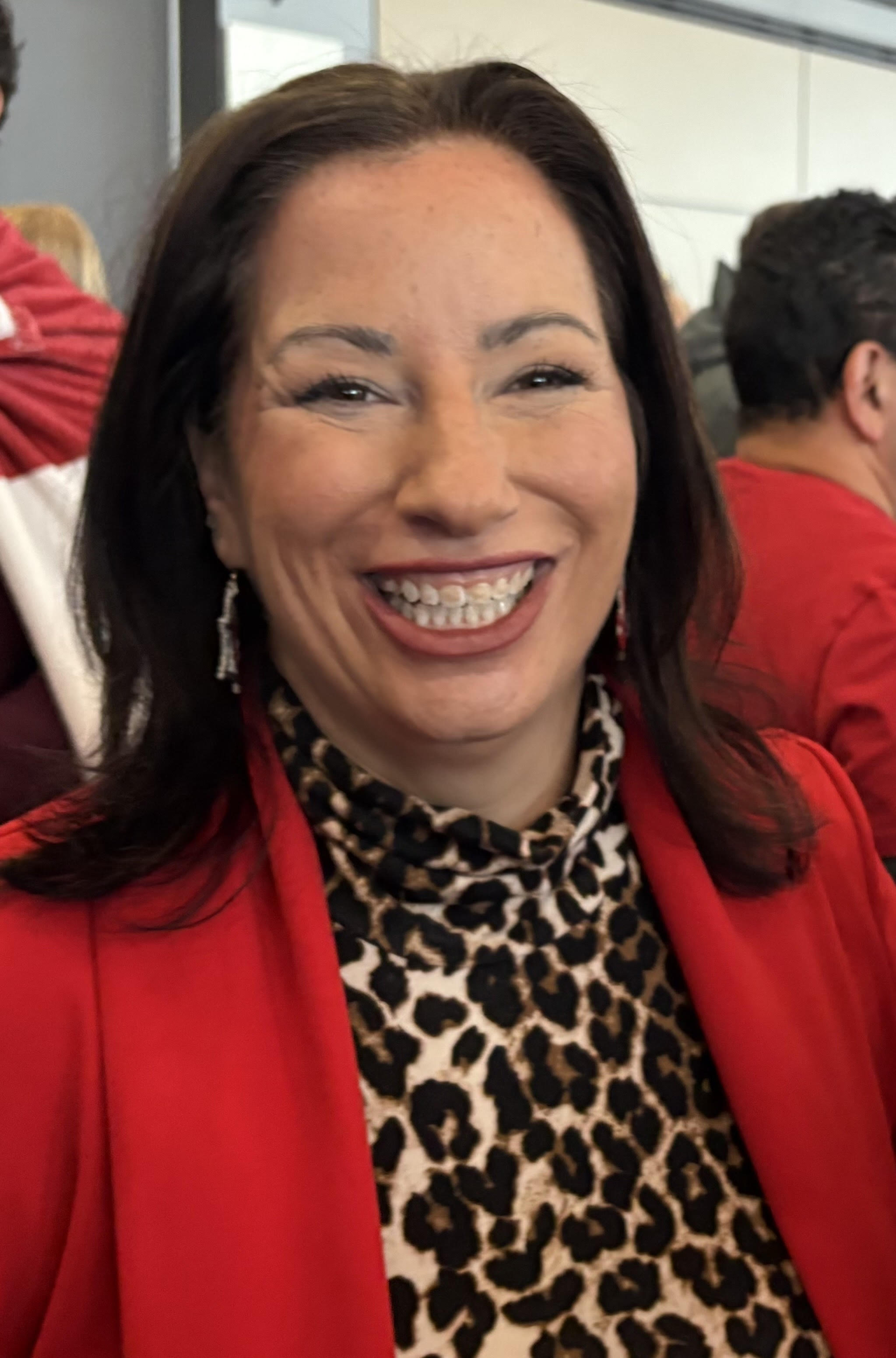

Member of Parliament for Lakeland
- Incumbent
- Assumed office October 19, 2015
- Preceded by: Riding Re-established

Personal details
- Born: December 8, 1979 (age 46) near Chipman, Alberta, Canada
- Party: Conservative (Federal); United Conservative Party (Provincial)
- Spouse: Shayne Saskiw
- Education: University of Alberta (BA)

Shannon Stubbs MP (born December 8, 1979) is a Canadian politician who was elected to represent the riding of Lakeland in the House of Commons of Canada in the 2015 federal election. She was re-elected to represent the same riding in the 2019 and 2021 federal elections.

== Background ==
Stubbs was born near Chipman, Alberta in 1979. She was born premature, with her heart, lungs, and jaw issues. She claims partial Ojibwa ancestry and is the daughter of Bruce Stubbs. She is the granddaughter of Eileen Stubbs, a former mayor of Dartmouth. Her mother died when she was 14. Of her grandmother, Stubbs has stated that “...She wasn’t partisan; she was all over the political map, but right and wrong mattered to her. I try to remember that and hope it will guide me in politics.”

Stubbs went to Lamont High School and holds a Bachelor of Arts (Joint Honours) in English and Political Science from the University of Alberta. During her university years, she served as an intern in Leader of the Opposition Preston Manning's office, and as an assistant to MP Deborah Grey. Stubbs is married to former Lac La Biche-St. Paul-Two Hills MLA Shayne Saskiw.

== Political career ==
=== Provincial politics ===
While working as a bureaucrat for the provincial government, Stubbs ran in the 2004 Alberta election for the governing Progressive Conservatives against Raj Pannu in Edmonton-Strathcona, placing a distant second. She later left the party and became involved with the Wildrose Party, serving as Danielle Smith's chief of staff from 2010 to 2012 and the party's Director of Legislative Affairs from 2012 to 2014.

In 2011, Stubbs won the Wildrose nomination in the riding of Fort Saskatchewan-Vegreville, held by premier Ed Stelmach, with hopes of overturning him in the 2012 Alberta election. He subsequently resigned and retired from politics, but Stubbs was defeated by PC candidate and former Strathcona County councillor Jacquie Fenske.

=== Federal politics ===
Stubbs was elected in the 2015 federal election to represent the Conservative Party in the newly recreated riding of Lakeland with a 74% popular vote. She was appointed to the position of deputy critic for natural resources by Conservative interim leader Rona Ambrose. Here, she serves on the House's Standing Committee on Natural Resources. She also serves as vice-chair for the Special Committee on Pay Equity.

Shortly after Stubbs was elected in 2015, the federal government announced the relocation of an Immigration, Refugees, and Citizenship Canada case-processing centre in Vegreville, Alberta to be moved to Edmonton for better access. Being a subject of controversy, the centre officially closed in September 2018. Stubbs, however, won a 2017 Maclean's Parliamentarian of the Year award for MP that best represents constituents for her efforts to keep this centre open.

During her first term, Stubbs participated in 497 Chamber Interventions, 338 Committee Interventions, and 892 Chamber Votes. She seconded Bill C-406 which was an Act to amend the Canada Elections Act (foreign contributions). This Bill, however, did not become a law. In September, 2016, Stubbs presented petition e-216 to the House of Commons.

In May 2018, Stubbs sponsored motion M-167, the instruction to the Standing Committee on Public Safety and National Security to undergo a study on rural crime in Canada. This motion was jointly seconded by 17 members and was agreed to on May 20, 2018.

Stubbs was in full support when Conservative leader Andrew Scheer ran for leadership in the 2017 Conservative Party leadership election.

Stubbs was re-elected with 83.9% of the votes for her riding during the 2019 federal election, making Canadian history for receiving the highest percentage for a female candidate. During the ensuing 43rd Canadian Parliament, she introduced one private member bill, Bill C-221, An Act to amend the Income Tax Act (oil and gas wells) which sought to create a tax credit for corporate expenses incurred during the decommissioning of old and inactive oil and gas wells. It was brought to a vote on March 10, 2021, but defeated with only the Conservatives and Green Party members voting in favour.

After Erin O'Toole became the Conservative Party leader, he reassigned Stubbs, effective September 8, 2020, to be the Official Opposition Shadow Minister for Public Safety and Emergency Preparedness.

In 2021 Stubbs again received a Maclean's Parliamentarian of the Year award for Member of Parliament that "Best Represents Constituents."

Following the Canadian federal election in September 2021, where the Conservative Party gained no seats and remained in opposition, Stubbs criticized O'Toole for his campaign leadership, and as of December 6, 2021, was the only MP calling for an early leadership review within 6 months. In early December 2021, O'Toole referred Stubbs for investigation by the House of Commons for allegedly creating a toxic workplace environment in her office. The Globe and Mail and The Canadian Press independently confirmed an incident in where some of Stubbs's employees felt pressured into painting a room in her house. Stubbs told The Globe that the housepainting was a gift and that the referral was reprisal by O'Toole over her criticism of her leadership.

She was elected vice chair of the Canadian House of Commons Standing Committee on Natural Resources in the 45th Canadian Parliament in 2025.

=== Roles in Parliament ===
==== Election candidate ====
Date	Election Type	Constituency	Province/Territory	Result
October 21, 2019	General Election	Lakeland	Alberta	Re-Elected
October 19, 2015	General Election	Lakeland	Alberta	Elected
Source: Parliament of Canada

==== Member of Parliament ====
Constituency	Province/Territory	Start date	End date
Lakeland	Alberta	October 21, 2019	-
Lakeland	Alberta	October 19, 2015	October 20, 2019
Source: Parliament of Canada

==== Political affiliation ====
Parliament	Political Affiliation	Start date	End date
43rd	Conservative	October 21, 2019	-
42nd	Conservative	October 19, 2015	October 20, 2019
Source: Parliament of Canada

==== Committees ====
Parliament-Session	Role	Committee	Start date	End date
42-1	Vice-chair	Natural Resources	September 20, 2017	September 11, 2019
42-1	Vice-chair	Pay Equity	March 7, 2016	June 9, 2016
42-1	Member	Subcommittee on Agenda and Procedure of the Standing Committee on Natural Resources	October 2, 2017	September 11, 2019
42-1	Member	Natural Resources	January 29, 2016	September 11, 2019
42-1	Member	Subcommittee on Agenda and Procedure of the Special Committee on Pay Equity	March 7, 2016	June 9, 2016
42-1	Member	Pay Equity	February 17, 2016	June 9, 2016
Source: Parliament of Canada

==== Parliamentary associations and inter-parliamentary groups ====
Parliament	Role	Association or Group	Start date	End date
42nd	Member	Canadian NATO Parliamentary Association	September 28, 2018	March 31, 2019
42nd	Member	Canada-United States Inter-Parliamentary Group	February 2, 2017	March 31, 2017
Source: Parliament of Canada

== Electoral record ==
=== Federal ===
2025 Canadian federal election: Lakeland
Party	Candidate	Votes	%	±%	Expenditures
Conservative	Shannon Stubbs	45,826	80.98	+11.58	$98,590.06
Liberal	Barry Milaney	6,886	12.17	+7.21	$2,165.27
New Democratic	Des Bissonnette	2,153	3.80	–6.71	$759.80
People's	Michael Manchen	982	1.74	–9.33	$8,126.64
Green	Bridget Burns	411	0.73	–0.15	none listed
Christian Heritage	Micheal Speirs	335	0.59	–	$2,245.57
Total valid votes/expense limit		56,593	99.62	–	$143,971.04
Total rejected ballots		216	0.38	–0.05	
Turnout		56,809	69.64	+2.75	
Eligible voters		81,581			
Conservative hold		Swing		+10.46	
Source: Elections Canada

2021 Canadian federal election: Lakeland
Party	Candidate	Votes	%	±%	Expenditures
Conservative	Shannon Stubbs	36,557	69.43	–14.48	$46,708.11
People's	Ann McCormack	5,827	11.07	+8.52	$15,179.04
New Democratic	Des Bissonnette	5,519	10.48	+4.01	$1,217.51
Liberal	John Turvey	2,610	4.96	+0.50	none listed
Maverick	Fred Sirett	1,674	3.18	–	$8,694.07
Green	Kira Brunner	464	0.88	–1.04	none listed
Total valid votes/expense limit		52,651	99.57	–	$124,350.72
Total rejected ballots		229	0.43	+0.09	
Turnout		52,880	66.89	–4.81	
Eligible voters		79,059			
Conservative hold		Swing		–11.50	
Source: Elections Canada

2019 Canadian federal election: Lakeland
Party	Candidate	Votes	%	±%	Expenditures
Conservative	Shannon Stubbs	48,314	83.91	+11.11	$62,299.17
New Democratic	Jeffrey Swanson	3,728	6.48	–3.59	none listed
Liberal	Mark Watson	2,565	4.46	–9.24	$1,657.78
People's	Alain Houle	1,468	2.55	–	$7,186.92
Green	Kira Brunner	1,105	1.92	–0.42	none listed
Libertarian	Robert George McFadzean	251	0.44	–0.66	none listed
Veterans Coalition	Roberta Marie Graham	147	0.26	–	none listed
Total valid votes/expense limit		57,578	99.66	–	$121,089.40
Total rejected ballots		198	0.34	+0.06	
Turnout		57,776	71.70	+2.79	
Eligible voters		80,578			
Conservative hold		Swing		+7.35	
Source: Elections Canada

2015 Canadian federal election: Lakeland
Party	Candidate	Votes	%	±%	Expenditures
Conservative	Shannon Stubbs	39,882	72.81	–6.19	$96,950.81
Liberal	Garry Parenteau	7,500	13.69	+8.59	$5,761.06
New Democratic	Duane Zaraska	5,513	10.06	–1.16	$8,006.40
Green	Danielle Montgomery	1,283	2.34	–1.88	none listed
Libertarian	Robert George McFadzean	601	1.10	–	$1,653.97
Total valid votes/expense limit		54,779	99.72	–	$242,495.35
Total rejected ballots		155	0.28	–	
Turnout		54,934	68.91	–	
Eligible voters		79,721			
Conservative notional hold		Swing		–7.39	
Source: Elections Canada

=== Provincial ===
2012 Alberta general election: Fort Saskatchewan-Vegreville
Party	Candidate	Votes	%	±%
Progressive Conservative	Jacquie Fenske	8,370	49.30%	-28.83%
Wildrose	Shannon Stubbs	5,803	34.18%	–
New Democratic	Chris Fulmer	1,553	9.15%	0.52%
Liberal	Spencer Dunn	843	4.97%	-4.43%
Evergreen	Matt Levicki	229	1.35%	-2.50%
Independent	Peter Schneider	180	1.06%	–
Total		16,978	–	–
Rejected, spoiled and declined		145	–	–
Eligible electors / turnout		29,561	57.92%	9.27%
Progressive Conservative hold		Swing		-26.81%
Source(s) Source: "60 - Fort Saskatchewan-Vegreville, 2012 Alberta general election". officialresults.elections.ab.ca. Elections Alberta.

2004 Alberta general election: Edmonton-Strathcona
Party	Candidate	Votes	%	±%
New Democratic	Raj Pannu	7,463	60.66	+10.04
Progressive Conservative	Shannon Stubbs	2,266	18.42	-15.93
Liberal	Steven Leard	1,854	15.07	+1.01
Green	Adrian Cole	288	2.34	–
Alberta Alliance	Jeremy Burns	273	2.22	–
Social Credit	Kelly Graham	160	1.30	–
Total		12,304	99.28	–
Rejected, spoiled and declined		89	0.72	+0.31
Turnout		12,393	49.91	-7.03
Eligible voters		24,830		
New Democratic hold		Swing		+12.99
Source(s) Source: Elections Alberta (November 22, 2004). "Edmonton-Strathcona Statement of Official Results 2004 Alberta general election" (PDF).
