= Anthony Hlynka =

Canadian politician (1907–1957)

Member of Parliament for Vegreville
- In office 1940–1949
- Preceded by: William Hayhurst
- Succeeded by: John Decore

Personal details
- Born: May 28, 1907 Denysiv, Ternopil Oblast, Halychyna, Austria-Hungary
- Died: April 25, 1957 (aged 49) Edmonton, Alberta, Canada
- Party: Social Credit Party of Canada
- Occupation: Journalist, publisher

Anthony Hlynka (May 28, 1907 – April 25, 1957) was a Canadian journalist, publisher, immigration activist and politician of Ukrainian descent. He represented Vegreville in the House of Commons of Canada from 1940 to 1949 as a member of the Social Credit Party of Canada. He is best remembered for his attempts to reform Canada's immigration laws after World War II to permit the immigration of Ukrainian displaced persons.

== Early life and career ==
Hlynka was born in the Western Ukrainian village of Denysiv, in Ternopil Oblast of Halychyna, then a province of the Austro-Hungarian Empire. He moved to Canada with his family in 1910, when he was three, and was raised in a homesteader community in Alberta's Delph district, about 18 miles northeast of Lamont. He was educated in both Ukrainian and English.

Hlynka moved to Edmonton in 1922 and graduated from Alberta College the following year, but was unable to attend university. He taught English to other Ukrainian immigrants, and worked at an insurance firm from 1929 to 1931. He also wrote for the paper Novyi shliakh (New Pathway), and was elected to its executive in November 1931. He was responsible for soliciting advertisements for the paper until it was moved to Saskatoon in 1933.

Hlynka was a founding member of the conservative Ukrainian National Federation of Canada (UNF) in 1932 and served for a time as its acting General Secretary. He started a periodical called Klych (The Call) in 1935. This paper had a strongly anti-communist editorial line. Hlynka joined the Alberta Social Credit League in 1937, and launched the party's Ukrainian language paper, Suspilnyi Kredyt (Social Credit), in February of that year. He later worked for the publicity department of the provincial Social Credit Board, and for the Department of Municipal Affairs. He delivered several speeches, and became a prominent figure in the Ukrainian community. He considered running for a seat in the Legislative Assembly of Alberta in the 1940 provincial election, but ultimately declined.

In 1964 the Ukrainian National Federation of Canada (UNF) named a street (Hlynka Place) in honour of Hlynka in the subdivision of "Sokil" located in Hawkestone, Ontario.

== Political career ==
Hlynka was first elected to the House of Commons of Canada in the 1940 federal election. At the time, the Vegreville Social Credit organization had a two-stage nomination process: delegates elected three candidates at a nomination meeting, one of whom was later chosen by an Advisory Board. Hylnka received the greatest number of votes in a field of five candidates, and was confirmed by the Advisory Board after a formal interview. The incumbent Member of Parliament (MP), William Hayhurst, had been eliminated in the first round of voting. The second-place candidate, Paul Lesiuk, officially challenged the Advisory Board's decision, and Hlynka's candidacy had to be reaffirmed by Alberta Premier William Aberhart and his cabinet.

In the general election, Hlynka defeated four other candidates in a closely contested race to win his first term in office. His election win made him the second person of Ukrainian descent elected to federal parliament, after Michael Luchkovich. Hlynka was the only person of Ukrainian background in parliament from 1940 to 1945, and received extensive coverage from the national press as a community representative

Hlynka was a strong supporter of Canada's involvement in World War II, and worked with the Ukrainian Canadian Committee to campaign for a "yes" vote in Canada's 1942 plebiscite on conscription. Despite their efforts, many ridings with large Ukrainian populations supported the "no" side.

Hlynka wrote A Struggle for Freemen in 1942. (It has been reissued in 2022 as a print on demand product.)

Hlynka was re-elected in the 1945 federal election, but was defeated in the 1949 federal election by Liberal candidate John Decore. Hlynka ran against Decore again in the 1953 federal election but was again defeated.

Following his first defeat in 1949, Social Credit MP Frederick Davis Shaw alleged that the communist Labor-Progressive Party which had received over 3,000 votes in the 1945 election in Vegreville, did not run a candidate in 1949 and backed Decore in order to ensure Hlynka's defeat.

He supported Ukrainian independence in a well-publicized 1942 speech, despite the fact that the Soviet Union was a Canadian ally at the time. Citing the Atlantic Charter, Hlynka argued that the Ukrainian people had a right to self-determination and that an independent Ukraine would help create stability in a post-war Europe. This proposal was denounced in the Edmonton Journal, which argued that the Soviet Union was playing a vital role in the war effort and could not have its territorial integrity threatened.

Hlynka was known for calling for the liberalization of immigration policy to help bring displaced persons to Canada and for assisting in the immigration of Ukrainian displaced persons in the aftermath of World War II. He traveled to Europe after the end of the war in 1945, and undertook a fact-finding tour of the camps operated by the United Nations Relief and Rehabilitation Administration (UNRRA). He then played a leading role in the public campaign for immigration law reform, which culminated in Prime Minister William Lyon Mackenzie King's decision in 1947 to open Canada's borders to able-bodied displaced persons from Europe. It is believed that Canada accepted more than 34,000 Ukrainian displaced persons and refugees between 1947 and 1952.

Hlynka's supporters have described him as the father of the third wave of Ukrainian immigration to Canada. Some have also described him as a sort of proto-multiculturalist, and have argued that his loyalty to both Canada and his ethnic community later became the normative view among cultural communities in the Canadian prairies.

Social Credit had little support outside of Alberta during the 1940s, and Hlynka spent his entire parliamentary career on the opposition benches. He did not mention his relations with other Social Credit MPs in his autobiography, and seems to have operated with a fair degree of independence. Some in the media regarded him as "the quintessential ethnic politician who was Ukrainian Canadian first and Social Crediter second", and one of his most prominent allies on Ukrainian issues was Walter Tucker, a leading Saskatchewan Liberal. In 1949, he refused to campaign against Nicholas Bachynsky, a prominent Ukrainian Canadian and Liberal-Progressive politician, in Manitoba's provincial election.

Hlynka was personally hurt by his defeat in 1949, and developed serious health problems in later years. He did not qualify for a parliamentary pension, and was forced to return to the insurance industry. He attempted to win a seat in the Legislative Assembly of Alberta in the 1955 provincial election, but was unsuccessful. He died of hypertension in Edmonton in 1957, at age 49; his autobiography was unfinished at the time of his death.

Hlynka was accused of anti-Semitism during his lifetime, a charge that he rejected. In a parliamentary debate, fellow MP Dorise Nielsen accused him of publishing "vicious anti-Semitism" during his time as a newspaper editor. Hlynka responded that he had never "written anything or said anything which was anti-Semitic" in his life, although he added that "[c]ertain individuals contributed to my publication and I published the things which I felt would be of interest to my people." In her book, Social Discredit: Social Credit and the Jewish Response (2000), Janine Stingel writes that Hlynka "exploited traditional Ukrainian antipathies towards Jews" during his time as editor of Suspil'nyi Kredyt.

Some have also accused Hlynka of self-aggrandizement and of naiveté. He considered himself to be the only democratically elected Ukrainian anywhere in the world, and as such believed he had "the moral right to speak on behalf of fifty million compatriots". Writing in the Journal of Ukrainian Studies, Peter. J. Melnycky argues that Hlynka was sincere in his commitments, and was genuinely grieved to discover that he "did not speak for the majority even of his own constituency" in the 1949 election. Melnycky also argues that Hlynka demonstrated poor judgement in his support for all postwar Ukrainian refugees, including "surrendered personal of the 14th Waffen SS Grenadiers Division," of which he had little personal knowledge.

== The Honourable Member for Vegreville ==
In 2005, Oleh Gerus and Denis Hlynka issued an English-language compendium of writings by and about Hlynka, entitled The Honourable Member for Vegreville: The Memoirs and Diary of Anthony Hlynka, MP. Published by the University of Calgary Press, the work was highlighted by Hlynka's unfinished autobiography. It received favourable reviews from the Edmonton Journal, Canadian Ethnic Studies and Ukrainian Weekly.

Peter J. Melnycky penned a critical review of the book in the Summer 2007 edition of the Journal of Ukrainian Studies. While acknowledging it as "an encouraging start to the publishing program of the Centre for Ukrainian Canadian Studies at the University of Manitoba", he also criticized the fact that it was intended more as a tribute than as a comprehensive historical biography. Melnycky notes that the editors sometimes avoid serious discussion of controversial issues (including the accusations of anti-Semitism), and adds that there is "a certain amount of hyperbole" in the text. He also notes that there are some errors in translation from Hlynka's original Ukrainian language diary.

== Electoral record ==
=== Federal ===
1953 Canadian federal election: Vegreville
Party	Candidate	Votes	%
Liberal	John Decore	8,023	46.98
Social Credit	Anthony Hlynka	6,709	39.28
Labour Progressive	Frank Eugene Maricle	2,346	13.74
Total valid votes		17,078	100.00
Total rejected ballots		123	
Turnout		17,201	68.48
Electors on the lists		25,118	

1949 Canadian federal election: Vegreville
Party	Candidate	Votes	%
Liberal	John Decore	8,859	55.41
Social Credit	Anthony Hlynka	7,128	44.59
Total valid votes		15,987	100.00
Total rejected ballots		109	
Turnout		16,096	76.48
Electors on the lists		21,045	

1945 Canadian federal election: Vegreville
Party	Candidate	Votes	%
Social Credit	Anthony Hlynka	7,146	42.30
Liberal	Albert Ernest Archer	4,806	28.45
Labour Progressive	William Halina	3,272	19.37
Co-operative Commonwealth	Michael Tomyn	1,668	9.87
Total valid votes		16,892	100.00
Total rejected ballots		187	
Turnout		17,079	80.21
Electors on the lists		21,292	

1940 Canadian federal election: Vegreville
Party	Candidate	Votes	%
Social Credit	Anthony Hlynka	5,083	36.12
Liberal	Albert Ernest Archer	4,605	32.72
United Progressive	William Halina	2,727	19.38
Co-operative Commonwealth	Herbert R. Boutillier	1,658	11.78
Total valid votes		14,073	100.00
Total rejected ballots		141	
Turnout		14,214	61.22
Electors on the lists		23,219	

=== Provincial ===
1955 Alberta general election: Edmonton
Party	Candidate	Votes 1st count	%	Votes final count	Elected
Social Credit	Ernest Charles Manning	23,216	30.33%	9,569	✓
Liberal	James Harper Prowse	18,755	24.50%	9,569	✓
Co-operative Commonwealth	Elmer Ernest Roper	4,444	5.81%	–	–
Conservative	John Percy Page	4,086	5.34%	9,224	✓
Liberal	Edgar Bailey	2,971	3.88%	–	–
Liberal	Andre Dechene	2,877	3.76%	–	–
Liberal	Abe William Miller	2,787	3.64%	9,569	✓
Social Credit	Anthony Hlynka	1,896	2.48%	–	–
Liberal	J. Laurier Payment	1,640	2.14%	–	–
Liberal	Harold Tanner	1,604	2.10%	9,569	✓
Social Credit	Joseph Donovan Ross	1,575	2.06%	9,483	✓
Social Credit	Edgar Gerhart	1,320	1.72%	9,121	✓
Conservative	Gifford Main	1,064	1.39%	–	–
Labor-Progressive	William Harasym	947	1.24%	–	–
Co-operative Commonwealth	Robert Atkin	940	1.23%	–	–
Social Credit	William J.M. Henning	785	1.03%	–	–
Conservative	Gerard Amerongen	692	0.90%	–	–
Social Credit	Cyril G. Havard	602	0.79%	–	–
Social Credit	Mrs. C.N. Hattersley	555	0.73%	–	–
Liberal	Lois Grant	552	0.72%	–	–
Conservative	Robert F. Lambert	548	0.72%	–	–
Co-operative Commonwealth	Floyd Johnson	458	0.60%	–	–
Conservative	Frederick John Mitchell	405	0.53%	–	–
Co-operative Commonwealth	Mary Crawford	383	0.50%	–	–
Co-operative Commonwealth	Ivor G. Dent	328	0.43%	–	–
Conservative	Mrs. John A. L. Smith	299	0.39%	–	–
Co-operative Commonwealth	Arthur E. Thompson	290	0.38%	–	–
Conservative	Robert L. Brower	221	0.29%	–	–
Co-operative Commonwealth	Hubert M. Smith	177	0.23%	–	–
Independent	Charles E. Payne	127	0.17%	–	–
Total		76,544	–	–	–
Rejected, spoiled and declined		6,248	–	–	–
Eligible electors / turnout		127,069	65.15%	–	–
Source(s) "Edmonton results 1955 Alberta general election". Alberta Online Encyclopedia. Note: Seven seats were awarded in the Edmonton Electoral District through single transferable vote. The Hare Quota, the number of votes needed to win a seat, was 5,969.

This election was determined by a single transferable ballot method of voting.
