= Arthur Moren Boutillier =

Canadian politician

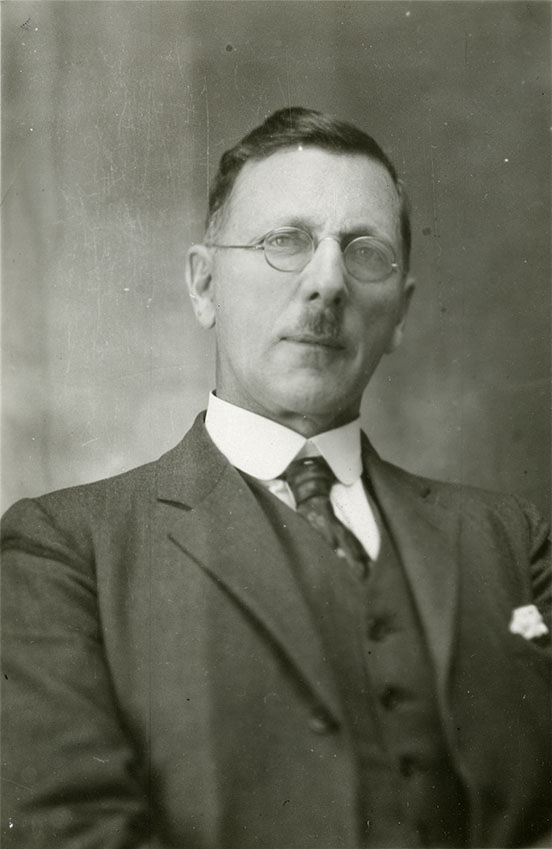

Member of Parliament for Vegreville
- In office 1925–1926
- Preceded by: new district
- Succeeded by: Michael Luchkovich

Personal details
- Born: Arthur Moren Boutilier; October 16, 1869 Halifax, Nova Scotia, Canada
- Died: February 24, 1955 (aged 85) Edmonton, Alberta, Canada
- Party: Progressive
- Profession: farmer

Arthur Moren Boutillier (October 16, 1869 – February 24, 1955) was a Canadian farmer and federal politician.

Boutillier was elected to the House of Commons of Canada under the Progressive banner. He defeated Liberal candidate Gorden Charles by a wide plurality. Boutillier did not run for re-election when Parliament dissolved in 1926.

Boutillier's son, Herbert R. Boutillier, was a Co-operative Commonwealth Federation candidate in the 1940 federal election. In 1955 he died in Edmonton, where he had moved after retiring in 1947.
