= Henry Bird Steinhauer =

Canadian Ojibwe missionary

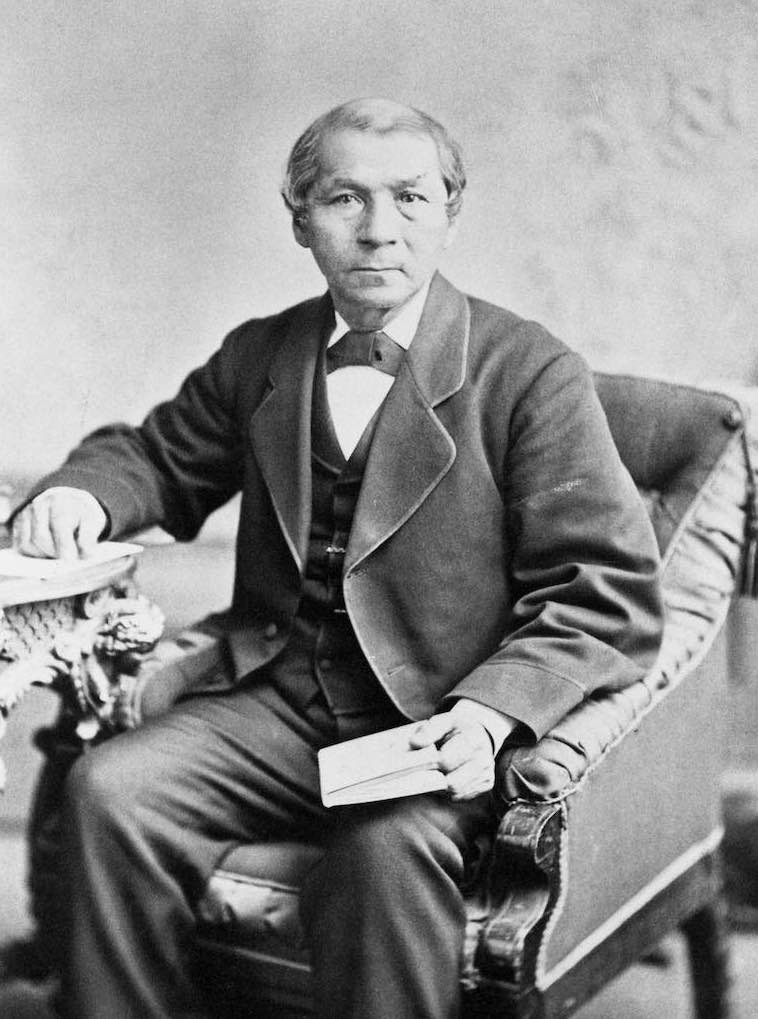
- c/o Glenbow Museum, Calgary, Alberta
- Born: Sowengisik; 1820; Rama, Lake Simcoe, Upper Canada
- Died: December 29, 1884 (aged 64); Whitefish Lake, Northwest Territory, Canada
- Education: Upper Canada Academy
- Occupation: Clergyman
- Spouse: Jessie Joyful (Seeseeb Mamanuwartum) (m. 1840)
- Children: 10

Sowengisik (1820–1884), later Henry Bird Steinhauer, upon adoption into a German-Canadian family, was an Ojibwe translator, missionary, clergyman of the Methodist Church, and by means of his assimilation into Western Canadian society, became of the first First Nations persons to achieve collegiate credentials at a Canadian institution.

== Early life and education ==
Steinhauer was born in Rama on Lake Simcoe in Ontario. He was born Chippewa Indian, likely named Sowengisik. He received the surname Steinhauer from a German family that adopted and educated him from a colonial perspective. Steinhauer was one of the first Indigenous Canadians to complete studies at a collegiate institute, graduating top of his class at Upper Canada Academy in Cobourg, Ontario. He was enrolled at UCA by Egerton Ryerson in 1835, completing his studies in 1839 after a one-year hiatus for missionary work at Alderville.

== Career ==
Steinhauer had an impressive ability for languages: Ojibwe, English, Cree, Greek, and Hebrew. He was employed by Principal Matthew Richey to proofread his literary work, possessing a greater skill for English grammar than his English-born peers.

He accompanied the Rev. James Evans, a Methodist missionary, to the northwest in 1840, and settled at Norway House, where he remained until 1855, providing value to the English missionaries as an interpreter. He assisted Evans in inventing and perfecting the Cree syllabic characters, in which nearly all Indigenous languages of Western Canada are written in today. He also translated into Cree the Old Testament from the book of Job to the end of the lesser prophets, and most of the New Testament.

He was ordained a minister in 1855, living at Whitefish Lake where he remained for the rest of his life. In 1875, due to an increase in immigration in the area, he began to assert his First Nations heritage more strongly. He withdrew from the missionary society he belonged to—the Missionary Society of the Wesleyan Methodist Church in Canada—though he continued with the religion and his own missionary work. He sent a rare critical letter to the Society, which was published.

== Personal life ==
In 1840, he married Jessie Joyful (Seeseeb Mamanuwartum), and they had ten children.

In 1884, he became ill from influenza and died on December 29.

The Steinhauer neighbourhood in Edmonton is named after him.
