= Vegreville (federal electoral district) =

Former federal electoral district in Alberta, Canada

Alberta electoral district

Defunct federal electoral district
- Legislature: House of Commons
- District created: 1924
- District abolished: 1997
- First contested: 1925
- Last contested: 1993

Vegreville was a federal electoral district in Alberta, Canada, that was represented in the House of Commons of Canada from 1925 to 1997. This riding was created in 1924 from parts of Strathcona and Victoria ridings.

It was abolished in 1996 when it was merged into Lakeland riding.

== Members of Parliament ==
Vegreville
Parliament	Years	Member	Party
District created from Strathcona and Victoria
15th	1925–1926	Arthur Moren Boutillier	Progressive
16th	1926–1930	Michael Luchkovich	United Farmers
17th	1930–1935	Michael Luchkovich	United Farmers
18th	1935–1940	William Hayhurst	Social Credit
19th	1940–1945	Anthony Hlynka	Social Credit
20th	1945–1949	Anthony Hlynka	Social Credit
21st	1949–1953	John Decore	Liberal
22nd	1953–1957	John Decore	Liberal
23rd	1957–1958	Peter Stefura	Social Credit
24th	1958–1962	Frank Fane	Progressive Conservative
25th	1962–1963	Frank Fane	Progressive Conservative
26th	1963–1965	Frank Fane	Progressive Conservative
27th	1965–1968	Frank Fane	Progressive Conservative
28th	1968–1972	Don Mazankowski	Progressive Conservative
29th	1972–1974	Don Mazankowski	Progressive Conservative
30th	1974–1979	Don Mazankowski	Progressive Conservative
31st	1979–1980	Don Mazankowski	Progressive Conservative
32nd	1980–1984	Don Mazankowski	Progressive Conservative
33rd	1984–1988	Don Mazankowski	Progressive Conservative
34th	1988–1993	Don Mazankowski	Progressive Conservative
35th	1993–1997	Leon Benoit	Reform
District redistributed into Lakeland

== Election results ==
1993 Canadian federal election
Party	Candidate	Votes	%	±%
Reform	Leon Benoit	19,732	54.74	+44.89
Progressive Conservative	Roger Lehr	8,180	22.69	–42.64
Liberal	Ed Wieclaw	5,610	15.56	+7.78
New Democratic	Terry Zawalski	1,175	3.26	–12.79
National	Alex Ziniewicz	562	1.56	–
Independent	Les Parsons	456	1.27	–
Natural Law	Katherine Emilia Fisher	191	0.53	–
Independent	Valerie Doreen Morrow	141	0.39	–0.46
Total valid votes		36,047	99.82	
Total rejected ballots		65	0.18	–0.05
Turnout		36,112	68.95	–7.78
Eligible voters		52,376		
Reform gain from Progressive Conservative		Swing		–
Source: Elections Canada

(Note: Valerie Morrow is author of the self-published book Can't Bury Me Tales - Valerie Morrow's Memoirs 1982-1996)

1988 Canadian federal election
Party	Candidate	Votes	%	±%
Progressive Conservative	Don Mazankowski	24,561	65.33	–14.87
New Democratic	Richard Johnson	6,035	16.05	+6.69
Reform	Sam Herman	3,705	9.86	–
Liberal	Ed Wieclaw	2,926	7.78	+0.93
Independent	R.W. Thompson	181	0.48	–
Independent	Valerie Doreen Morrow	137	0.36	–
Confederation of Regions	Lawrence Schlamp	51	0.14	–1.19
Total valid votes		37,596	99.77	
Total rejected ballots		88	0.23	–0.04
Turnout		37,684	76.73	+5.76
Eligible voters		49,113		
Progressive Conservative hold		Swing		–10.78
Source: Elections Canada

1984 Canadian federal election
Party	Candidate	Votes	%	±%
Progressive Conservative	Don Mazankowski	32,480	80.20	+5.39
New Democratic	George Oleksiuk	3,793	9.37	+0.13
Liberal	Evangéline Forcier	2,775	6.85	–5.89
Confederation of Regions	Lawrence Schlamp	537	1.33	–
Social Credit	Steve Kostiuk	372	0.92	–0.76
Rhinoceros	Bobby Bruso	347	0.86	–0.19
Communist	Tim Firth	194	0.48	–0.02
Total valid votes		40,498	99.72	
Total rejected ballots		113	0.28	–0.04
Turnout		40,611	70.97	+3.63
Eligible voters		57,224		
Progressive Conservative hold		Swing		–
Source: Elections Canada

1980 Canadian federal election
Party	Candidate	Votes	%	±%
Progressive Conservative	Don Mazankowski	25,682	74.81	–3.55
Liberal	Florence Rachansky	4,373	12.74	+1.34
New Democratic	Henry Mandelbaum	3,172	9.24	–0.22
Social Credit	Alex Gordey	575	1.68	–
Rhinoceros	Carl M. Hohol	359	1.05	–
Communist	William Arnold Tuomi	170	0.50	–0.29
Total valid votes		34,331	99.68	
Total rejected ballots		110	0.32	+0.09
Turnout		34,441	67.34	–0.02
Eligible voters		51,146		
Progressive Conservative hold		Swing		–2.45
Source: Elections Canada

1979 Canadian federal election
Party	Candidate	Votes	%	±%
Progressive Conservative	Don Mazankowski	26,448	78.36	+6.19
Liberal	Gerry Witiuk	3,848	11.40	–2.23
New Democratic	James Kenney	3,191	9.46	–2.10
Communist	William Arnold Tuomi	264	0.78	–
Total valid votes		33,751	99.77	
Total rejected ballots		77	0.23	–0.33
Turnout		33,828	67.36	–4.56
Eligible voters		50,220		
Progressive Conservative hold		Swing		+4.21
Source: Elections Canada

1974 Canadian federal election
Party	Candidate	Votes	%	±%
Progressive Conservative	Don Mazankowski	18,328	72.17	–0.76
Liberal	Ron C. Harris	3,461	13.63	–0.39
New Democratic	Winston Gereluk	2,935	11.56	+1.69
Social Credit	Bob Sommerville	671	2.64	+0.24
Total valid votes		25,395	99.44	
Total rejected ballots		142	0.56	–0.95
Turnout		25,537	71.92	–6.27
Eligible voters		35,509		
Progressive Conservative hold		Swing		+0.57
Source: Library of Parliament

1972 Canadian federal election
Party	Candidate	Votes	%	±%
Progressive Conservative	Don Mazankowski	19,500	72.94	+8.35
Liberal	Virgil P. Moshansky	3,747	14.02	–6.62
New Democratic	Einar Arnold Jonson	2,639	9.87	+0.60
Social Credit	Abram Goerzen	642	2.40	–
Independent	Neil Stenberg	208	0.78	–
Total valid votes		26,736	98.49	
Total rejected ballots		410	1.51	+1.00
Turnout		27,146	78.19	+3.74
Eligible voters		34,720		
Progressive Conservative hold		Swing		+7.48
Source: Library of Parliament

1968 Canadian federal election
Party	Candidate	Votes	%	±%
Progressive Conservative	Don Mazankowski	15,855	64.59	–5.18
Liberal	Jules Van Brabant	5,066	20.64	+8.30
New Democratic	Lester Albin Lindgren	2,277	9.28	+3.97
Independent PC	George M. Eglinski	1,349	5.50	–
Total valid votes		24,547	99.49	
Total rejected ballots		126	0.51	–0.00
Turnout		24,673	74.45	–1.39
Eligible voters		33,142		
Progressive Conservative hold		Swing		–6.74
Source: Library of Parliament

1965 Canadian federal election
Party	Candidate	Votes	%	±%
Progressive Conservative	Frank Fane	12,163	69.77	+2.33
Liberal	Nicholas J. Kuzyk	2,151	12.34	+4.06
Social Credit	Metro Tomyn	1,798	10.31	–4.25
New Democratic	Norman T. Flach	925	5.31	–0.63
Communist	Walter Makowecki	397	2.28	–0.11
Total valid votes		17,434	99.49	
Total rejected ballots		90	0.51	+0.15
Turnout		17,524	75.83	–5.90
Eligible voters		23,109		
Progressive Conservative hold		Swing		–
Source: Library of Parliament

1963 Canadian federal election
Party	Candidate	Votes	%	±%
Progressive Conservative	Frank Fane	12,859	67.43	+14.91
Social Credit	Metro Tomyn	2,777	14.56	–13.35
Liberal	Ralph Steinhauer	1,579	8.28	+0.53
New Democratic	Ted Chudyk	1,132	5.94	–3.20
Communist	Frank Eugene Maricle	455	2.39	–
Independent	Anna Pidruchney	267	1.40	–1.29
Total valid votes		19,069	99.63	
Total rejected ballots		70	0.37	–0.22
Turnout		19,139	81.73	+2.95
Eligible voters		23,416		
Progressive Conservative hold		Swing		+14.13
Source: Library of Parliament

1962 Canadian federal election
Party	Candidate	Votes	%	±%
Progressive Conservative	Frank Fane	9,710	52.53	+6.04
Social Credit	Peter Stefura	5,159	27.91	–3.56
New Democratic	Ted Chudyk	1,688	9.13	+1.35
Liberal	Mark Todd	1,432	7.75	–2.27
Independent	Anna Pidruchney	497	2.69	–
Total valid votes		18,486	99.42	
Total rejected ballots		108	0.58	+0.24
Turnout		18,594	78.79	+6.49
Eligible voters		23,600		
Progressive Conservative hold		Swing		+4.80
Source: Library of Parliament

1958 Canadian federal election
Party	Candidate	Votes	%	±%
Progressive Conservative	Frank Fane	7,918	46.49	+36.71
Social Credit	Peter Stefura	5,360	31.47	–8.76
Liberal	Jacob Ruhl	1,706	10.02	–17.70
Co-operative Commonwealth	Nancy Zazeybida	1,326	7.79	–10.03
Labor–Progressive	Frank Eugene Maricle	723	4.25	–0.23
Total valid votes		17,033	99.66	
Total rejected ballots		58	0.34	–0.21
Turnout		17,091	72.29	–5.29
Eligible voters		23,641		
Progressive Conservative gain from Social Credit		Swing		–
Source: Library of Parliament

1957 Canadian federal election
Party	Candidate	Votes	%	±%
Social Credit	Peter Stefura	7,327	40.22	+0.94
Liberal	Fred Magera	5,048	27.71	–19.27
Co-operative Commonwealth	Nancy Zazeybida	3,246	17.82	–
Progressive Conservative	Frank Fane	1,780	9.77	–
Labor–Progressive	Frank Eugene Maricle	815	4.47	–9.26
Total valid votes		18,216	99.45	
Total rejected ballots		101	0.55	–0.16
Turnout		18,317	77.59	+9.11
Eligible voters		23,608		
Social Credit gain from Liberal		Swing		+10.10
Source: Library of Parliament

1953 Canadian federal election
Party	Candidate	Votes	%	±%
Liberal	John Decore	8,023	46.98	–8.44
Social Credit	Anthony Hlynka	6,709	39.28	–5.30
Labor–Progressive	Frank Eugene Maricle	2,346	13.74	–
Total valid votes		17,078	99.28	
Total rejected ballots		123	0.72	+0.04
Turnout		17,201	68.48	–8.00
Eligible voters		25,118		
Liberal hold		Swing		+6.87
Source: Library of Parliament

1949 Canadian federal election
Party	Candidate	Votes	%	±%
Liberal	John Decore	8,859	55.41	+26.96
Social Credit	Anthony Hlynka	7,128	44.59	+2.28
Total valid votes		15,987	99.32	
Total rejected ballots		109	0.68	–0.42
Turnout		16,096	76.48	–3.73
Eligible voters		21,045		
Liberal gain from Social Credit		Swing		+14.62
Source: Library of Parliament

1945 Canadian federal election
Party	Candidate	Votes	%	±%
Social Credit	Anthony Hlynka	7,146	42.30	+6.19
Liberal	Albert Ernest Archer	4,806	28.45	–4.27
Labor–Progressive	William Halina	3,272	19.37	–
Co-operative Commonwealth	Michael Tomyn	1,668	9.87	–1.91
Total valid votes		16,892	98.91	
Total rejected ballots		187	1.09	+0.10
Turnout		17,079	80.21	+19.00
Eligible voters		21,292		
Social Credit hold		Swing		+5.23
Source: Library of Parliament

1940 Canadian federal election
Party	Candidate	Votes	%	±%
Social Credit	Anthony Hlynka	5,083	36.12	+5.44
Liberal	Albert Ernest Archer	4,605	32.72	+11.76
United Progressive	William Halina	2,727	19.38	–
Co-operative Commonwealth	Herbert R. Boutillier	1,658	11.78	–15.21
Total valid votes		14,073	99.01	
Total rejected ballots		141	0.99	–0.31
Turnout		14,214	61.22	–4.65
Eligible voters		23,219		
Social Credit hold		Swing		–
Note: William Halina campaigned under the United Progressive party banner which may have been related to the Progressive Unity united front candidates supported by the Communist Party in Saskatchewan.
Source: Library of Parliament

1935 Canadian federal election
Party	Candidate	Votes	%	±%
Social Credit	William Hayhurst	4,124	30.68	–
Co-operative Commonwealth	Michael Luchkovich	3,628	26.99	–
Liberal	Joseph S. McCallum	2,818	20.96	–23.99
Communist	Matthew Popovich	2,001	14.89	–
Conservative	James Bismark Holden	871	6.48	–
Total valid votes		13,442	98.69	
Total rejected ballots		178	1.31	+0.05
Turnout		13,620	65.87	–1.71
Eligible voters		20,678		
Social Credit gain from United Farmers of Alberta		Swing		–
Source: Library of Parliament

1930 Canadian federal election
Party	Candidate	Votes	%	±%
United Farmers of Alberta	Michael Luchkovich	5,510	55.05	+0.18
Liberal	Charles Gordon	4,500	44.96	–
Total valid votes		10,010	98.75	
Total rejected ballots		127	1.25	+0.44
Turnout		10,137	67.58	+14.95
Eligible voters		15,001		
United Farmers of Alberta hold		Swing		–
Source: Library of Parliament

1926 Canadian federal election
Party	Candidate	Votes	%	±%
United Farmers of Alberta	Michael Luchkovich	4,106	54.86	–
Unknown	Joseph S. McCallum	3,378	45.14	–
Total valid votes		7,484	99.19	
Total rejected ballots		61	0.81	+0.14
Turnout		7,545	52.63	–6.49
Eligible voters		14,337		
United Farmers of Alberta gain from Progressive		Swing		–
Source: Library of Parliament

1925 Canadian federal election
Party	Candidate	Votes	%	±%
Progressive	Arthur Moren Boutillier	5,103	65.88	–
Liberal	Charles Gordon	2,643	34.12	–
Total valid votes		7,746	99.33	
Total rejected ballots		52	0.67	–
Turnout		7,798	59.12	–
Eligible voters		13,191		
Source: Library of Parliament

== See also ==
- List of Canadian electoral districts
- Historical federal electoral districts of Canada
