= Alberta Liberal Party leadership elections =

This page lists the results of leadership elections held by the Alberta Liberal Party. Delegated conventions were held until 1988. Elections held since 1994 have been on a One member, one vote basis.

== 1905 leadership convention ==
(Held August 3, 1905)

- Alexander Cameron Rutherford accl.

== Developments, 1905–1924 ==
Alexander Rutherford resigned as Premier on May 26, 1910, and was succeeded by Arthur Sifton. Sifton was appointed by the Lieutendant Governor and it is assumed that Sifton was confirmed as leader at a subsequent convention.

Sifton in turn resigned as premier on October 30, 1917, and Charles Stewart was appointed by the Lieutenant Governor to replace him. It is also assumed that Stewart was confirmed as party leader at a subsequent convention.

After the Stewart government's defeat in the 1921 election and Stewart's resignation as party leader on appointment to the federal cabinet, John R. Boyle was elected by the caucus to replace him on February 2, 1922.

== 1924 leadership convention ==
(Held November 27, 1924)

- Charles Richmond Mitchell accl.

Jeremiah Heffernan, Andrew Robert McLennan, William Thomas Henry, Stanley Tobin, Joseph Miville Dechene, Hugh John Montgomery, Jesse Gouge, William Ashbury Buchanan, William R. Howson were all nominated as candidates at the convention but immediately withdrew.

== 1926 leadership convention ==
(Held April 21, 1926)

- Joseph Tweed Shaw accl.

== 1930 leadership convention ==
(Held March 27, 1930)

First Ballot:

- John W. McDonald 113
- William R. Howson 103
- John C. Bowen 47
- Hugh John Montgomery 22

Second Ballot:

- John W. McDonald 138
- William R. Howson 109
- John C. Bowen 31
- Hugh John Montgomery 12

Third Ballot (Montgomery eliminated):

- John W. McDonald 158
- William R. Howson 117
- John C. Bowen 17

== 1932 leadership convention ==
(Held October 21, 1932)

- William R. Howson accl.

== 1937 leadership convention ==
(Held June 4, 1937)

- Edward Leslie Gray accl.

Joseph Tweed Shaw, John J. Bowlen, Frederick William Gershaw and two others withdrew. Joseph Miville Dechene was also nominated but was not present at the convention and was declared to be ineligible.

== 1947 leadership convention ==
(Held June 25, 1947)

- James Harper Prowse elected
- Joseph Tremblay
- J.M. Wheatley

(Note: The vote totals do not appear to have been released.)

== 1958 leadership convention ==
(Held November 1, 1958)

- Grant MacEwan 314
- Richard Walker 200
- Richard Edward Hall eliminated on first ballot

(MacEwan elected on the second ballot. The vote totals for the first ballot were not released)

== 1962 leadership convention ==
(Held January 14, 1962)

- Dave Hunter elected
- Bryce Stringam

(Note: The vote totals were not announced and Hunter's margin of victory was reported to be "decisive")

== 1966 leadership convention ==
(Held January 15, 1966)

First Ballot:

- Adrian Berry 231
- Bob Russell 231
- Wilbur Freeland 78
- Richard Broughton 15

Second Ballot (Broughton eliminated):

- Adrian Berry 261
- Bob Russell 243
- Wilbur Freeland 34

Third Ballot (Freeland eliminated):

- Adrian Berry 277
- Bob Russell 245

(Berry resigned as Liberal Leader on November 7, 1966, and Michael Maccagno was appointed interim leader on November 14, 1966)

== 1967 leadership convention ==
(Held January 28, 1967)

- Michael Maccagno accl.

== 1969 leadership convention ==
(Held April 26, 1969)

First Ballot:

- John T. Lowery 284
- Don Branigan 194
- Bob Russell 171
- Trevor Midgley 77

Second Ballot (Midgley eliminated):

- John T. Lowery 317
- Don Branigan 207
- Bob Russell 188

Third Ballot (Russell eliminated):

- John T. Lowery 356
- Don Branigan 341

== 1971 leadership convention ==
(Held March 13, 1971)

- Bob Russell 224
- Rod Woodcock 51
- John Day 30
- Arthur Yates 19

== 1974 leadership convention ==
(Held March 2, 1974)

- Nicholas Taylor 366
- John Borger 293

(Note: There were 78 abstentions)

== 1988 leadership convention ==
(Held October 9, 1988)

- Laurence Decore 801
- Grant Mitchell 385
- Nicholas Taylor 259

== 1994 leadership election ==
(Held November 13, 1994)

First Ballot:

- Grant Mitchell 4,799
- Sine Chadi 3,772
- Adam Germain 1,663
- Gary Dickson 706
- Tom Sindlinger 64

Second Ballot (Mitchell, Chadi and Germain move to the next round):

(Note: this ballot used a preferential ballot)

- Grant Mitchell 4,121
- Sine Chadi 3,587
- Adam Germain 1,357

Third Ballot (Germain eliminated and vote distributed):

- Grant Mitchell 4,934
- Sine Chadi 3,794

== 1998 leadership election ==
(Held April 18, 1998)

- Nancy MacBeth 4,271
- Ken Nicol 2,042
- Karen Leibovici 1,038
- Linda Sloan 285

== 2001 leadership election ==
(Following Nancy MacBeth's personal defeat in the 2001 election, Ken Nicol was appointed interim leader and was acclaimed at the ensuing leadership election)

(Held September 14–15, 2001)

- Ken Nicol accl.

== 2004 leadership election ==
(Held March 27, 2004)

- Kevin Taft 2,354
- John Reil 205
- Jon Parsons Friel 174

== 2008 leadership election ==
(Held December 12, 2008)

- David Swann 2,468
- Dave Taylor 1,616
- Mo Elsalhy 491

== 2011 leadership election ==
(Held September 10, 2011)

- Raj Sherman 4,684
- Hugh MacDonald 2,239
- Laurie Blakeman 854
- Bill Harvey 626
- Bruce Payne 197

== 2017 leadership election ==
(Held June 4, 2017)

=== Results ===
Candidate	Votes	Percentage
David Khan		54.8%
Kerry Cundal		46.2%
Total	1,671	100%

Abstentions: 10

== 2022 leadership election ==
On December 8, 2022, then interim leader John Roggeveen was appointed permanent leader of the party after no candidate ran in the leadership election by the initial deadline.

== See also ==
- leadership convention
- Alberta Liberal Party
