= Bob Russell (Canadian politician) =

Canadian politician (1930–2022)

Leader of the Alberta Liberal Party
- In office 1971–1974
- Preceded by: John T. Lowery
- Succeeded by: Nicholas Taylor

Personal details
- Born: 18 December 1930 California, U.S.
- Died: 30 August 2022 (aged 91) St. Albert, Alberta, Canada
- Party: Liberal (provincial and federal)
- Spouse: Joanne (m. 1954)
- Children: 3
- Profession: realtor, paralegal

Robert A. "Bob" Russell (18 December 1930 – 30 August 2022) was a Canadian politician from Alberta. He served as the President of the Alberta Liberal Party, and a municipal councillor in St. Albert, Alberta.

== Early life ==
Russell was born in 1930 in California and was raised on a farm in the Burns Lake, British Columbia area where he lived until the age of 14 when the family moved to Lethbridge, Alberta. His father served in World War I and World War II. Russell was an active sportsman in his teens, winning a Canadian welterweight boxing championship as well as playing junior ice hockey during high school. He began working for Canadian Pacific Airlines in 1949 and was eventually transferred to Vancouver, where he married his wife in 1954. They moved to St. Albert, Alberta in 1963.

== Provincial politics ==
A realtor by profession, Russell first came to prominence by running for the leadership of the Alberta Liberal Party in 1966. He was defeated by Calgary lawyer Adrian Berry, but nevertheless ran in the 1967 provincial election as a Liberal in the riding of St. Albert. He finished second of four candidates, 527 votes behind Keith Everitt of Social Credit. In 1969 he ran for the party's leadership again, losing this time to another Calgarian, John T. Lowery. The party had no seats in the legislature at this point, and Lowery responded by exploring coalition options with Social Credit. These explorations were opposed by much of the party's membership, including Russell, and Lowery resigned from the leadership without contesting an election. This time, Russell was successful in becoming Liberal leader.

He led the party in the 1971 election, in which it was unsuccessful in winning any seats. Russell himself finished third in St. Albert. Two years later, in a Calgary-Foothills by-election resulting from the death of Len Werry, Russell placed a distant fourth. Following this defeat, he resigned the party leadership in 1974 and was succeeded by Nicholas Taylor.

== Federal politics ==
After leaving provincial politics, Russell became the president of the Liberal Party of Canada in Alberta.

During the 1984 federal election, Russell ran as a Liberal in the riding of Pembina. He finished third, as Progressive Conservative Peter Elzinga received more than seventy percent of the vote.

== Municipal politics ==
In 1986, Russell turned his attention to municipal politics and ran for St. Albert City Council. He finished ninth of thirteen candidates (the top six were elected), which prompted him to comment that he might be finished with politics. However, he ran again in 1989, and was this time elected. In 1992, he ran against incumbent Anita Ratchinsky for mayor. He was defeated, but returned to city council as an alderman in 1995, and was re-elected in 1998.

== Return to federal politics ==
During the 2000 federal election, Russell ran as a Liberal in the riding of St. Albert. He finished a distant second to incumbent Canadian Alliance Member of Parliament John G. Williams, receiving fewer than half the number of votes that Williams did.

== Return to municipal politics ==
During his second stint on city council, Russell reversed himself on the West Regional Road debate. While he had previously supported the so-called "west bypass" alignment that would have seen a bridge cross the Sturgeon River near the mouth of Big Lake, an eleven thousand name petition opposing the alignment apparently convinced him to support the alternative Ray Gibbon Drive alignment, which crossed the river further from the mouth of the lake and was the recommendation of the CityPlan process, a months long municipal planning initiative initiated by council in part in response to the petition. This incurred the wrath of S.E.N.S.I.B.L.E. Choice, a lobby group that publicly endorsed a set of pro-bypass candidates in the 2001 election; Russell was defeated, along with fellow pro-Ray Gibbon incumbents Paul Chalifoux, Penny Reeves, and Jim Starko. He sought unsuccessfully to return to city council in the 2004 municipal election.

He ran for council again in 2007 and finished eleventh of twelve candidates and was not elected, and did not run in the following election in 2010. He returned to politics and successful in his run for a council seat in 2013 but was defeated in 2017. He ran for mayor of St. Albert again in 2021 but finished fourth of four candidates with 9.9% of the vote.

== Other activities ==
Russell has held a number of community and political positions, including president of the Liberal riding association in Edmonton—St. Albert, Director of the St. Albert Senior Citizens Club, co-chair of the Standing Committee on Agriculture of the Liberal Party of Canada in Alberta, and President of the Big Lake Environmental Support Society.
