= 33rd Canadian Parliament =

1984-88 seating of the national legislature of the North American country

- Majority parliament
- Nov. 5, 1984 – Oct. 1, 1988

Parliament leaders
- Prime minister: Rt. Hon. Brian Mulroney; Sep. 17, 1984 – Jun. 25, 1993
- Cabinet: 24th Canadian Ministry
- Leader of the Opposition: Rt. Hon. John Turner; September 17, 1984 – February 7, 1990

Party caucuses
- Government: Progressive Conservative Party
- Opposition: Liberal Party
- Recognized: New Democratic Party

House of Commons
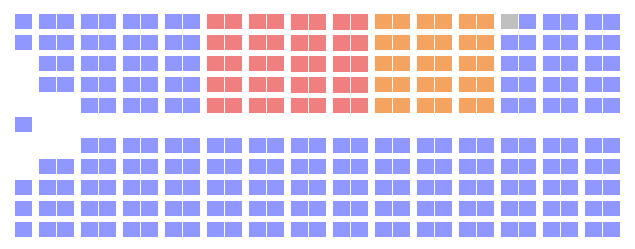
- Seating arrangements of the House of Commons
- Speaker of the Commons: Hon. John William Bosley; November 5, 1984 – September 29, 1986
- Hon. John Allen Fraser; September 30, 1986 – January 16, 1994
- Government House leader: Hon. Ray Hnatyshyn; November 5, 1984 – June 29, 1986
- Hon. Don Mazankowski; June 30, 1986 – December 30, 1988
- Opposition House leader: Hon. Herb Gray; September 18, 1984 – February 7, 1990
- Members: 282 MP seats List of members

Senate
- Seating arrangements of the Senate
- Speaker of the Senate: Hon. Guy Charbonneau; November 2, 1984 – December 6, 1993
- Government Senate leader: Hon. Dufferin Roblin; September 17, 1984 – June 29, 1986
- Hon. Lowell Murray; June 30, 1986 – November 3, 1993
- Opposition Senate leader: Hon. Allan MacEachen; September 16, 1984 – November 30, 1991
- Senators: 104 senator seats List of senators

Sovereign
- Monarch: Elizabeth II; 6 February 1952 – 8 September 2022
- Governor general: Jeanne Sauvé; 14 May 1984 – 29 January 1990

Sessions
- 1st session November 5, 1984 – August 28, 1986
- 2nd session September 30, 1986 – October 1, 1988
← 32nd	→ 34th

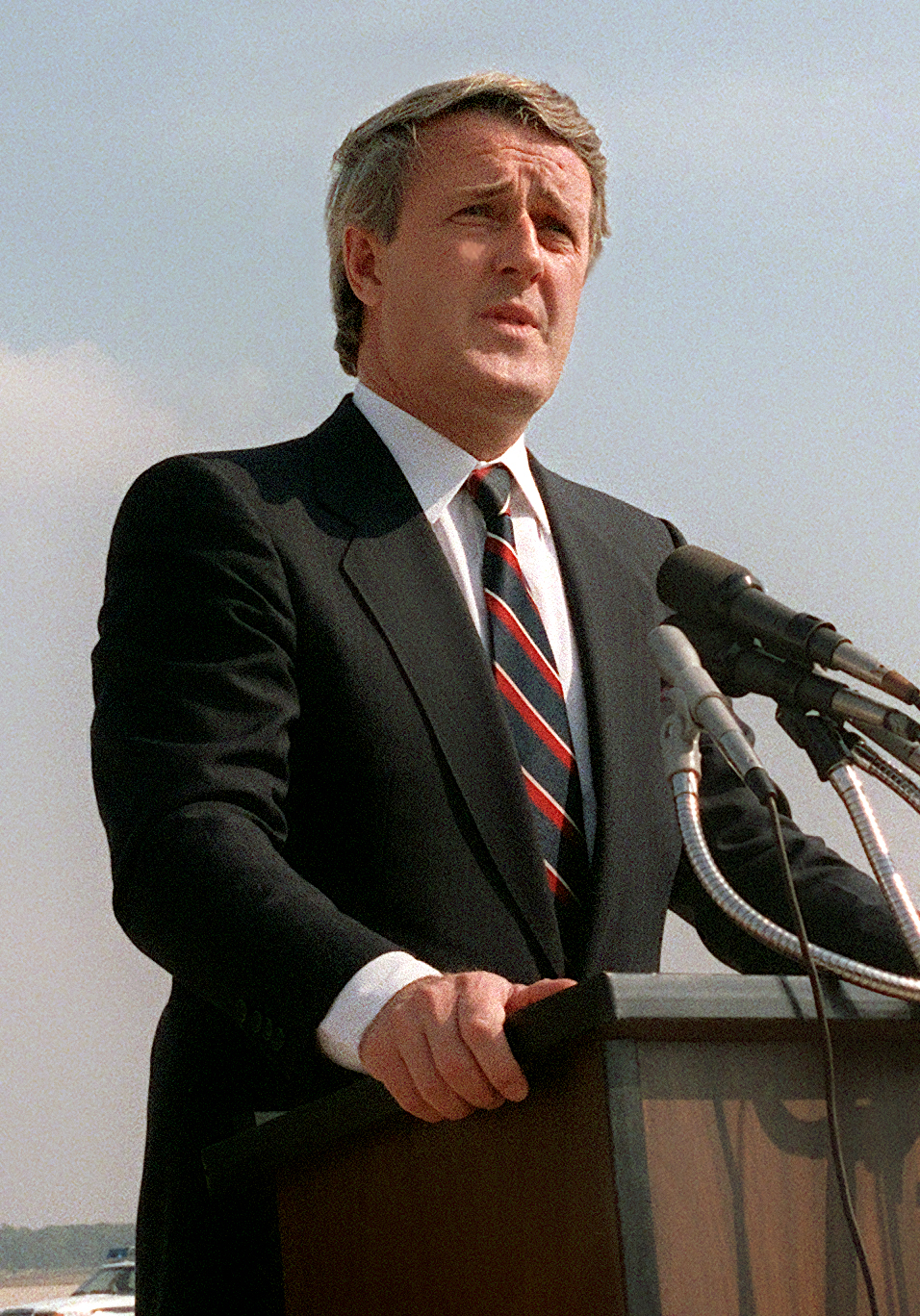
Brian Mulroney (pictured here in 1984) was Prime Minister during the 33rd Canadian Parliament.

The 33rd Canadian Parliament was in session from November 5, 1984, until October 1, 1988. The membership was set by the 1984 federal election on September 4, 1984, and it only changed slightly due to resignations and by-elections prior to being dissolved before the 1988 election.

There were two sessions of the 33rd Parliament:

Session	Start	End
1st	November 5, 1984	August 28, 1986
2nd	September 30, 1986	October 1, 1988

== Overview ==
It was controlled by a Progressive Conservative majority under Prime Minister Brian Mulroney and the 24th Canadian Ministry. The Official Opposition was the Liberal Party, led by former prime minister John Turner.

== Party standings ==
The party standings as of the election and as of dissolution were as follows:

Affiliation	House members		Senate members	
Affiliation	1984 election results	At dissolution	On election day 1984	At dissolution
Progressive Conservative	211	203	23	36
Liberal	40	38	74	59
New Democratic	30	32	0	0
Independent	1	4	3	5
Independent Liberal	0	0	1	0
Total seats	282	277	101	100
Vacant	0	5	3	4
Total seats	282		104	

== Major events ==
=== Criminal Law Amendments ===
The Criminal Law Amendment Act, 1985 brought in reforms to Canada's criminal code to tackle many subject including but not limited to impaired driving and boating, computer crime, hostage-taking, and offences against nuclear material.

=== The Shamrock Summit ===
On March 17th, 1985 (Saint Patrick's Day), American president Ronald Reagan arrived in Canada to meet with Prime Minister Mulroney. The two worked to find agreement on a number of policy items including salmon fishing in the pacific, mutual legal assistance, and space exploration. The event also included a highly choreographed segment, with a televised broadcast featuring many performances and the now famous moment in which the two leaders stood together on stage with their wives to sing "When Irish Eyes are Smiling".

Documents declassified in 1999 showed that both administrations considered this event a revolution in American-Canadian relations.

=== Reduction of the corporate tax rate ===
On September 13, 1988, bill C-139 received royal assent. Among other changes, this act lowering Canada's corporate income tax rate by 8%, from 36% to 28%. The rate would be lowered again, to 22.1% under the Chretien government, and then once again, to 15% under the Harper government in 2012.

=== United States free trade negotiations ===
The Mulroney government began negotiations on CUFTA in 1987. It was signed by President Reagan and Prime Minister Mulroney on January 2, 1988, and would come into effect under the second Mulroney administration in 1989.

== Ministry ==
The 24th Canadian Ministry lasted for the entirety of the 33rd Canadian Parliament and most of the 34th Canadian Parliament.

== Officeholders ==
=== Head of State ===
Office	Photo	Name	Assumed office	Left office
Sovereign		Elizabeth II	February 6, 1952	September 8, 2022
Governor General		Jeanne Sauvé	May 14,1984	January 29, 1990

=== Party leadership ===
Party	Photo	Name	Assumed Office	Left Office
Progressive Conservative		Brian Mulroney	June 11, 1983	June 13, 1993
Liberal		John Turner	June 16, 1984	June 23, 1990
New Democratic		Ed Broadbent	July 7, 1975	December 5, 1989

=== House of Commons ===
==== Presiding officer ====
Party	Photo	Name	Riding	Assumed Office	Left Office	Party
Speaker of the House of Commons		John Bosley	Don Valley West	November 5, 1984	September 29, 1986	Progressive Conservative
Speaker of the House of Commons		John Allen Fraser	Vancouver South	September 30, 1986	January 16, 1994	Progressive Conservative

==== Government leadership (Progressive Conservative) ====
Office	Photo	Officer	Riding	Assumed Office	Left Office
Prime Minister		Brian Mulroney	Manicouagan	September 17, 1984	June 25, 1993
House Leader		Ray Hnatyshyn	Saskatoon West	September 17, 1984	June 30, 1986
House Leader		Don Mazankowski	Vegreville	June 30, 1986	April 3, 1989
Whip		Chuck Cook	North Vancouver—Burnaby	1984	1985
Whip		Thomas Fennell	Ontario	1985	1988

== Parliamentarians ==
=== House of Commons ===
Members of the House of Commons in the 33rd parliament arranged by province.

Key:

- Party leaders are italicized.
- Parliamentary secretaries is indicated by "‡".
- Cabinet ministers are in **boldface**.
- The Prime Minister is **both**.
- The Speaker is indicated by "(†)".

==== Alberta ====
Name	Party	Electoral district	First elected / previously elected	No. of terms
Jack Shields ‡	Progressive Conservative	Athabasca	1980	2nd term
Gordon Taylor	Progressive Conservative	Bow River	1979	3rd term
**Harvie Andre**	Progressive Conservative	Calgary Centre	1972	5th term
Alex Kindy	Progressive Conservative	Calgary East	1984	1st term
Paul Gagnon	Progressive Conservative	Calgary North	1984	1st term
Bobbie Sparrow	Progressive Conservative	Calgary South	1984	1st term
Jim Hawkes ‡	Progressive Conservative	Calgary West	1979	3rd term
Arnold Malone	Progressive Conservative	Crowfoot	1974	4th term
William Lesick	Progressive Conservative	Edmonton East	1984	1st term
Steve Paproski	Progressive Conservative	Edmonton North	1968	6th term
Jim Edwards ‡	Progressive Conservative	Edmonton South	1984	1st term
Murray Dorin	Progressive Conservative	Edmonton West	1984	1st term
David Kilgour ‡	Progressive Conservative	Edmonton—Strathcona	1979	3rd term
Blaine Thacker ‡	Progressive Conservative	Lethbridge—Foothills	1979	3rd term
Robert Harold Porter	Progressive Conservative	Medicine Hat	1984	1st term
Albert Cooper	Progressive Conservative	Peace River	1980	2nd term
Peter Elzinga	Progressive Conservative	Pembina	1974	4th term
Walter van de Walle (1986)*	Progressive Conservative	Pembina	1986	1st term
Gordon Towers ‡	Progressive Conservative	Red Deer	1972	5th term
**Don Mazankowski**	Progressive Conservative	Vegreville	1968	6th term
Kenneth Schellenberger ‡	Progressive Conservative	Wetaskiwin	1972	5th term
**Joe Clark**	Progressive Conservative	Yellowhead	1972	5th term

*Peter Elzinga resigned from parliament to enter provincial politics. He was replaced by Walter van de Walle in a September 29, 1986, by-election.

==== British Columbia ====
Name	Party	Electoral district	First elected / previously elected	No. of terms
Svend Robinson	New Democrat	Burnaby	1979	3rd term
Mary Collins	Progressive Conservative	Capilano	1984	1st term
Lorne Greenaway ‡	Progressive Conservative	Cariboo—Chilcotin	1979	3rd term
Ray Skelly	New Democrat	Comox—Powell River	1979	3rd term
James Manly	New Democrat	Cowichan—Malahat—The Islands	1980	2nd term
Patrick Crofton	Progressive Conservative	Esquimalt—Saanich	1984	1st term
Ross Belsher	Progressive Conservative	Fraser Valley East	1984	1st term
Robert Wenman ‡	Progressive Conservative	Fraser Valley West	1974	4th term
Nelson Riis	New Democrat	Kamloops—Shuswap	1980	2nd term
Stan Graham	Progressive Conservative	Kootenay East—Revelstoke	1979, 1984	2nd term*
Robert Brisco	Progressive Conservative	Kootenay West	1974, 1984	3rd term*
**Gerry St. Germain**	Progressive Conservative	Mission—Port Moody	1983	2nd term
Ted Schellenberg ‡	Progressive Conservative	Nanaimo—Alberni	1984	1st term
Pauline Jewett	New Democrat	New Westminster—Coquitlam	1963, (Note: Northumberland (Ontario) (First elected as a Liberal)) 1979	4th term*
Chuck Cook ‡	Progressive Conservative	North Vancouver—Burnaby	1979	3rd term
Vincent Dantzer	Progressive Conservative	Okanagan North	1980	2nd term
Frederick King	Progressive Conservative	Okanagan—Similkameen	1979	3rd term
Robert McCuish	Progressive Conservative	Prince George—Bulkley Valley	1979	3rd term
**Frank Oberle Sr.** ‡	Progressive Conservative	Prince George—Peace River	1972	5th term
**Tom Siddon**	Progressive Conservative	Richmond—South Delta	1978	4th term
James Fulton	New Democrat	Skeena	1979	3rd term
Benno Friesen ‡	Progressive Conservative	Surrey—White Rock—North Delta	1974	4th term
**Pat Carney**	Progressive Conservative	Vancouver Centre	1980	2nd term
Margaret Mitchell	New Democrat	Vancouver East	1979	3rd term
Ian Waddell	New Democrat	Vancouver Kingsway	1979	3rd term
John Turner	Liberal	Vancouver Quadra	1962, (Note: St. Lawrence—St. George (Quebec)/Ottawa—Carleton (Ontario)) 1984	7th term*
**John Allen Fraser** (†)	Progressive Conservative	Vancouver South	1972	5th term
Allan McKinnon	Progressive Conservative	Victoria	1972	5th term

==== Manitoba ====
Name	Party	Electoral district	First elected / previously elected	No. of terms
Lee Clark ‡	Progressive Conservative	Brandon—Souris	1983	2nd term
Rodney Murphy	New Democrat	Churchill	1979	3rd term
Brian White	Progressive Conservative	Dauphin	1984	1st term
**Jack Murta**	Progressive Conservative	Lisgar	1970	6th term
**Charles Mayer**	Progressive Conservative	Portage—Marquette	1979	3rd term
**Jake Epp**	Progressive Conservative	Provencher	1972	5th term
Léo Duguay	Progressive Conservative	Saint Boniface	1984	1st term
Felix Holtmann	Progressive Conservative	Selkirk—Interlake	1984	1st term
David Orlikow	New Democrat	Winnipeg North	1962	9th term
Cyril Keeper	New Democrat	Winnipeg North Centre	1980	2nd term
Dan McKenzie ‡	Progressive Conservative	Winnipeg—Assiniboine	1972	5th term
Bill Blaikie	New Democrat	Winnipeg—Birds Hill	1979	3rd term
Lloyd Axworthy	Liberal	Winnipeg—Fort Garry	1979	3rd term
Clement Minaker	Progressive Conservative	Winnipeg—St. James	1984	1st term

==== New Brunswick ====
Name	Party	Electoral district	First elected / previously elected	No. of terms
Fred McCain	Progressive Conservative	Carleton—Charlotte	1972	5th term
Robert Corbett	Progressive Conservative	Fundy—Royal	1978	4th term
Roger Clinch ‡	Progressive Conservative	Gloucester	1984	1st term
**Bernard Valcourt** ‡	Progressive Conservative	Madawaska—Victoria	1984	1st term
Dennis Cochrane	Progressive Conservative	Moncton	1984	1st term
Bud Jardine	Progressive Conservative	Northumberland—Miramichi	1984	1st term
Al Girard	Progressive Conservative	Restigouche	1984	1st term
**Gerald Merrithew**	Progressive Conservative	Saint John	1984	1st term
Fernand Robichaud	Liberal	Westmorland—Kent	1984	1st term
J. Robert Howie	Progressive Conservative	York—Sunbury	1972	5th term

==== Newfoundland ====
Name	Party	Electoral district	First elected / previously elected	No. of terms
Morrissey Johnson	Progressive Conservative	Bonavista—Trinity—Conception	1984	1st term
Joseph Price ‡	Progressive Conservative	Burin—St. George's	1984	1st term
George Baker	Liberal	Gander—Twillingate	1974	4th term
Bill Rompkey	Liberal	Grand Falls—White Bay—Labrador	1972	5th term
Brian Tobin	Liberal	Humber—Port au Port—St. Barbe	1980	2nd term
James McGrath	Progressive Conservative	St. John's East	1957, 1968	9th term*
Jack Harris (1987)*	New Democrat	St. John's East	1987	1st term
**John Crosbie**	Progressive Conservative	St. John's West	1976	4th term

- James McGrath resigned from Parliament to become Lieutenant Governor of Newfoundland and was replaced by Jack Harris in a July 20, 1987, by-election

==== Nova Scotia ====
Name	Party	Electoral district	First elected / previously elected	No. of terms
Pat Nowlan	Progressive Conservative	Annapolis Valley—Hants	1965	7th term
Lawrence O'Neil	Progressive Conservative	Cape Breton Highlands—Canso	1984	1st term
David Dingwall	Liberal	Cape Breton—East Richmond	1980	2nd term
Russell MacLellan	Liberal	Cape Breton—The Sydneys	1979	3rd term
**Elmer MacKay**	Progressive Conservative	Central Nova	1971, 1984	6th term*
**Robert Coates**	Progressive Conservative	Cumberland—Colchester	1957	11th term
Michael Forrestall ‡	Progressive Conservative	Dartmouth—Halifax East	1965	7th term
**Stewart McInnes** ‡	Progressive Conservative	Halifax	1984	1st term
Howard Crosby	Progressive Conservative	Halifax West	1978	4th term
Lloyd Crouse	Progressive Conservative	South Shore	1957	11th term
Gerald Comeau	Progressive Conservative	South West Nova	1984	1st term

==== Ontario ====
Name	Party	Electoral district	First elected / previously elected	No. of terms
Maurice Foster	Liberal	Algoma	1968	6th term
Neil Young	New Democrat	Beaches	1980	2nd term
**John McDermid** ‡	Progressive Conservative	Brampton—Georgetown	1979	3rd term
Derek Blackburn	New Democrat	Brant	1971	6th term
Lynn McDonald	New Democrat	Broadview—Greenwood	1982	2nd term
Gary Gurbin ‡	Progressive Conservative	Bruce—Grey	1979	3rd term
Bill Kempling ‡	Progressive Conservative	Burlington	1972	5th term
Chris Speyer ‡	Progressive Conservative	Cambridge	1979	3rd term
Keith Penner	Liberal	Cochrane	1968	6th term
Charles Caccia	Liberal	Davenport	1968	6th term
Bill Attewell	Progressive Conservative	Don Valley East	1984	1st term
John Bosley (†)	Progressive Conservative	Don Valley West	1979	3rd term
Allan Lawrence	Progressive Conservative	Durham—Northumberland	1972	5th term
Roland de Corneille	Liberal	Eglinton—Lawrence	1979	3rd term
**John Wise**	Progressive Conservative	Elgin	1972	5th term
Girve Fretz ‡	Progressive Conservative	Erie	1979	3rd term
James Caldwell	Progressive Conservative	Essex—Kent	1984	1st term
Steven W. Langdon	New Democrat	Essex—Windsor	1984	1st term
**Michael Wilson**	Progressive Conservative	Etobicoke Centre	1979	3rd term
Robert Pennock	Progressive Conservative	Etobicoke North	1984	1st term
Patrick Boyer	Progressive Conservative	Etobicoke—Lakeshore	1984	1st term
Don Boudria	Liberal	Glengarry—Prescott—Russell	1984	1st term
Gus Mitges	Progressive Conservative	Grey—Simcoe	1972	5th term
William Winegard ‡	Progressive Conservative	Guelph	1984	1st term
Bud Bradley ‡	Progressive Conservative	Haldimand—Norfolk	1979	3rd term
**Otto Jelinek**	Progressive Conservative	Halton	1972	5th term
Sheila Copps	Liberal	Hamilton East	1984	1st term
Ian Deans	New Democrat	Hamilton Mountain	1980	2nd term
Marion Dewar (1987)*	New Democrat	Hamilton Mountain	1987	1st term
Geoffrey Scott ‡	Progressive Conservative	Hamilton—Wentworth	1978	4th term
Peter Peterson	Progressive Conservative	Hamilton West	1984	1st term
Bill Vankoughnet	Progressive Conservative	Hastings—Frontenac	1979	3rd term
Murray Cardiff ‡	Progressive Conservative	Huron—Bruce	1980	2nd term
John Parry	New Democrat	Kenora—Rainy River	1984	1st term
Elliott Hardey	Progressive Conservative	Kent	1984	1st term
**Flora MacDonald**	Progressive Conservative	Kingston and the Islands	1972	5th term
John Reimer	Progressive Conservative	Kitchener	1979, 1984	2nd term*
Sidney Fraleigh	Progressive Conservative	Lambton—Middlesex	1979, 1984	2nd term*
**Paul Dick** ‡	Progressive Conservative	Lanark—Renfrew—Carleton	1972	5th term
Jennifer Cossitt ‡	Progressive Conservative	Leeds—Grenville	1982	2nd term
**Shirley Martin** ‡	Progressive Conservative	Lincoln	1984	1st term
Jim Jepson	Progressive Conservative	London East	1984	1st term
**Tom Hockin**	Progressive Conservative	London West	1984	1st term
Terry Clifford	Progressive Conservative	London—Middlesex	1984	1st term
Robert Horner	Progressive Conservative	Mississauga North	1984	1st term
Don Blenkarn	Progressive Conservative	Mississauga South	1972, 1979	4th term*
William Tupper	Progressive Conservative	Nepean—Carleton	1984	1st term
Rob Nicholson	Progressive Conservative	Niagara Falls	1984	1st term
John Rodriguez	New Democrat	Nickel Belt	1972, 1984	4th term*
Moe Mantha	Progressive Conservative	Nipissing	1984	1st term
**George Hees**	Progressive Conservative	Northumberland	1950, (Note: Broadview) 1965	12th term*
Thomas Fennell	Progressive Conservative	Ontario	1979	3rd term
Ed Broadbent	New Democrat	Oshawa	1968	6th term
Barry Turner	Progressive Conservative	Ottawa—Carleton	1984	1st term
Michael Cassidy	New Democrat	Ottawa Centre	1984	1st term
David Daubney	Progressive Conservative	Ottawa West	1984	1st term
Jean-Robert Gauthier	Liberal	Ottawa—Vanier	1972	5th term
Bruce Halliday	Progressive Conservative	Oxford	1974	4th term
Andrew Witer	Progressive Conservative	Parkdale—High Park	1984	1st term
Stan Darling	Progressive Conservative	Parry Sound-Muskoka	1972	5th term
Harry Brightwell	Progressive Conservative	Perth	1984	1st term
Bill Domm ‡	Progressive Conservative	Peterborough	1979	3rd term
Jack Ellis	Progressive Conservative	Prince Edward—Hastings	1972	5th term
Len Hopkins	Liberal	Renfrew—Nipissing—Pembroke	1965	7th term
**David Crombie**	Progressive Conservative	Rosedale	1978	4th term
Ken James ‡	Progressive Conservative	Sarnia	1984	1st term
**James Kelleher**	Progressive Conservative	Sault Ste. Marie	1984	1st term
Pauline Browes ‡	Progressive Conservative	Scarborough Centre	1984	1st term
Robert Hicks	Progressive Conservative	Scarborough East	1984	1st term
Reginald Stackhouse	Progressive Conservative	Scarborough West	1972, (Note: Scarborough East) 1984	2nd term*
**Doug Lewis** ‡	Progressive Conservative	Simcoe North	1979	3rd term
Ronald Stewart ‡	Progressive Conservative	Simcoe South	1979	3rd term
Dan Heap	New Democrat	Spadina	1981	2nd term
Joseph Reid	Progressive Conservative	St. Catharines	1979	3rd term
**Barbara McDougall**	Progressive Conservative	St. Paul's	1984	1st term
Norman Warner	Progressive Conservative	Stormont—Dundas	1984	1st term
Doug Frith	Liberal	Sudbury	1980	2nd term
Iain Angus	New Democrat	Thunder Bay—Atikokan	1984	1st term
Ernie Epp	New Democrat	Thunder Bay—Nipigon	1984	1st term
John MacDougall	Progressive Conservative	Timiskaming	1982	2nd term
Aurèle Gervais	Progressive Conservative	Timmins—Chapleau	1984	1st term
Aideen Nicholson	Liberal	Trinity	1974	4th term
William C. Scott	Progressive Conservative	Victoria—Haliburton	1965	7th term
**Walter McLean**	Progressive Conservative	Waterloo	1979	3rd term
Allan Pietz	Progressive Conservative	Welland	1984	1st term
**Perrin Beatty**	Progressive Conservative	Wellington—Dufferin—Simcoe	1972	5th term
John Oostrom	Progressive Conservative	Willowdale	1984	1st term
Herb Gray	Liberal	Windsor West	1962	9th term
Howard McCurdy	New Democrat	Windsor—Walkerville	1984	1st term
Bob Kaplan	Liberal	York Centre	1968, (Note: Don Valley) 1974	5th term*
Alan Redway	Progressive Conservative	York East	1984	1st term
Tony Roman	Independent	York North	1984	1st term
Paul McCrossan	Progressive Conservative	York—Scarborough	1978, 1984	3rd term*
John Nunziata	Liberal	York South—Weston	1984	1st term
**Sinclair Stevens**	Progressive Conservative	York—Peel	1972	5th term
Sergio Marchi	Liberal	York West	1984	1st term

* Ian Deans left parliament to be appointed to a position in the federal government and was replaced by Marion Dewar in a 1987 by-election.

==== Prince Edward Island ====
Name	Party	Electoral district	First elected / previously elected	No. of terms
Pat Binns ‡	Progressive Conservative	Cardigan	1984	1st term
George Henderson	Liberal	Egmont	1980	2nd term
**Thomas McMillan**	Progressive Conservative	Hillsborough	1979	3rd term
Melbourne Gass ‡	Progressive Conservative	Malpeque	1979	3rd term

==== Quebec ====
Name	Party	Electoral district	First elected / previously elected	No. of terms
Guy St-Julien	Progressive Conservative	Abitibi	1984	1st term
Lise Bourgault ‡	Progressive Conservative	Argenteuil—Papineau	1984	1st term
Gilles Bernier	Progressive Conservative	Beauce	1984	1st term
Jean-Guy Hudon ‡	Progressive Conservative	Beauharnois—Salaberry	1984	1st term
**Pierre Blais** ‡	Progressive Conservative	Bellechasse	1984	1st term
**Robert de Cotret**	Progressive Conservative	Berthier—Maskinongé—Lanaudière	1978, (Note: Ottawa Centre (Ontario)) 1984	2nd term*
**Monique Landry** ‡	Progressive Conservative	Blainville—Deux-Montagnes	1984	1st term
Darryl Gray	Progressive Conservative	Bonaventure—Îles-de-la-Madeleine	1984	1st term
Carlo Rossi	Liberal	Bourassa	1979	3rd term
Gabrielle Bertrand ‡	Progressive Conservative	Brome—Missisquoi	1984	1st term
Richard Grisé ‡	Progressive Conservative	Chambly	1984	1st term
Michel Champagne ‡	Progressive Conservative	Champlain	1984	1st term
Monique Tardif ‡	Progressive Conservative	Charlesbourg	1984	1st term
Charles-André Hamelin ‡	Progressive Conservative	Charlevoix	1984	1st term
Ricardo Lopez	Progressive Conservative	Châteauguay	1984	1st term
André Harvey	Progressive Conservative	Chicoutimi	1984	1st term
**Gerry Weiner** ‡	Progressive Conservative	Dollard	1984	1st term
Jean-Guy Guilbault	Progressive Conservative	Drummond	1984	1st term
Vincent Della Noce ‡	Progressive Conservative	Duvernay	1984	1st term
**Marcel Masse**	Progressive Conservative	Frontenac	1984	1st term
Michel Gravel	Progressive Conservative	Gamelin	1984	1st term
Charles-Eugène Marin	Progressive Conservative	Gaspé	1984	1st term
Claudy Mailly ‡	Progressive Conservative	Gatineau	1984	1st term
Édouard Desrosiers	Progressive Conservative	Hochelaga—Maisonneuve	1984	1st term
Gaston Isabelle	Liberal	Hull—Aylmer	1965	7th term
**Roch La Salle**	Progressive Conservative	Joliette	1968	6th term
Jean-Pierre Blackburn	Progressive Conservative	Jonquière	1984	1st term
André Plourde	Progressive Conservative	Kamouraska—Rivière-du-Loup	1984	1st term
Fernand Ladouceur	Progressive Conservative	Labelle	1984	1st term
Clément M. Côté	Progressive Conservative	Lac-Saint-Jean	1984	1st term
**Lucien Bouchard** (1988)*	Progressive Conservative	Lac-Saint-Jean	1988	1st term
**Robert Layton**	Progressive Conservative	Lachine	1984	1st term
**Michel Côté**	Progressive Conservative	Langelier	1984	1st term
Fernand Jourdenais	Progressive Conservative	La Prairie	1984	1st term
Claude Lanthier ‡	Progressive Conservative	Lasalle	1984	1st term
David Berger	Liberal	Laurier	1979	3rd term
Guy Ricard	Progressive Conservative	Laval	1984	1st term
Raymond Garneau	Liberal	Laval-des-Rapides	1984	1st term
Gabriel Fontaine	Progressive Conservative	Lévis	1984	1st term
Nic Leblanc	Progressive Conservative	Longueuil	1984	1st term
Maurice Tremblay	Progressive Conservative	Lotbinière	1984	1st term
Suzanne Duplessis ‡	Progressive Conservative	Louis-Hébert	1984	1st term
**Brian Mulroney**	Progressive Conservative	Manicouagan	1983	2nd term
Jean-Luc Joncas	Progressive Conservative	Matapédia—Matane	1984	1st term
François Gérin ‡	Progressive Conservative	Mégantic—Compton—Stanstead	1984	1st term
Anne Blouin	Progressive Conservative	Montmorency—Orléans	1984	1st term
Sheila Finestone	Liberal	Mount Royal	1984	1st term
Carole Jacques	Progressive Conservative	Montreal—Mercier	1984	1st term
Jean-Claude Malépart	Liberal	Montreal—Sainte-Marie	1979	3rd term
Warren Allmand	Liberal	Notre-Dame-de-Grâce	1965	7th term
Lucie Pépin	Liberal	Outremont	1984	1st term
André Ouellet	Liberal	Papineau	1967	7th term
Barry Moore	Progressive Conservative	Pontiac—Gatineau—Labelle	1984	1st term
Marc Ferland	Progressive Conservative	Portneuf	1984	1st term
Marcel Tremblay	Progressive Conservative	Québec-Est	1984	1st term
Louis Plamondon	Progressive Conservative	Richelieu	1984	1st term
Alain Tardif	Liberal	Richmond	1979	3rd term
**Monique Vézina**	Progressive Conservative	Rimouski—Témiscouata	1984	1st term
**Benoît Bouchard**	Progressive Conservative	Roberval	1984	1st term
**Suzanne Blais-Grenier****	Progressive Conservative	Rosemont	1984	1st term
**Suzanne Blais-Grenier****	Independent	Rosemont	1984	1st term
Marcel Prud'homme	Liberal	Saint-Denis	1964	8th term
Don Johnston***	Liberal	Saint-Henri—Westmount	1978	4th term
Don Johnston***	Independent Liberal	Saint-Henri—Westmount	1978	4th term
**Andrée Champagne**	Progressive Conservative	Saint-Hyacinthe	1984	1st term
Jacques Guilbault	Liberal	Saint-Jacques	1968	6th term
**André Bissonnette**	Progressive Conservative	Saint-Jean	1984	1st term
Alfonso Gagliano	Liberal	Saint-Léonard—Anjou	1984	1st term
Jean Chrétien	Liberal	Saint-Maurice—Champlain	1963	8th term
Gilles Grondin (1986)****	Liberal	Saint-Maurice—Champlain	1986	1st term
Marie Thérèse Killens	Liberal	Saint-Michel—Ahuntsic	1979	3rd term
Jean Lapierre	Liberal	Shefford	1979	3rd term
**Jean Charest**	Progressive Conservative	Sherbrooke	1984	1st term
Gabriel Desjardins	Progressive Conservative	Témiscamingue	1984	1st term
Robert Toupin*****	Progressive Conservative	Terrebonne	1984	1st term
Robert Toupin*****	Independent	Terrebonne	1984	1st term
Robert Toupin*****	New Democrat	Terrebonne	1984	1st term
Robert Toupin*****	Independent	Terrebonne	1984	1st term
Pierre H. Vincent ‡	Progressive Conservative	Trois-Rivières	1984	1st term
**Pierre Cadieux**	Progressive Conservative	Vaudreuil	1984	1st term
Marcel Danis	Progressive Conservative	Verchères	1984	1st term
Gilbert Chartrand	Progressive Conservative	Verdun—Saint-Paul	1984	1st term

* Clément M. Côté resigned and was replaced by Lucien Bouchard in a June 20, 1988, by-election.
** Don Johnston resigned from the Liberal caucus to sit as an Independent Liberal on January 18, 1988.
*** Suzanne Blais-Grenier expelled from the Progressive Conservative for refusing to withdraw allegations of kickbacks involving the Quebec wing of the party and sat as an independent on September 21, 1988.
**** Jean Chrétien resigned from parliament due to poor relations with the party leader. He was replaced by Gilles Grondin in a June 29, 1986, by-election.
***** Robert Toupin left the Progressive Conservative sat as an independent on May 14, 1986 and join the New Democratic Party on December 16, 1986. And left the NDP to sit again as an independent on October 26, 1987.

==== Saskatchewan ====
Name	Party	Electoral district	First elected / previously elected	No. of terms
Lenard Gustafson ‡	Progressive Conservative	Assiniboia	1979	3rd term
Vic Althouse	New Democrat	Humboldt—Lake Centre	1980	2nd term
**Bill McKnight**	Progressive Conservative	Kindersley—Lloydminster	1979	3rd term
Jack Scowen	Progressive Conservative	Mackenzie	1984	1st term
Bill Gottselig	Progressive Conservative	Moose Jaw	1984	1st term
Stan Hovdebo	New Democrat	Prince Albert	1979	3rd term
Alvin Hamilton	Progressive Conservative	Qu'Appelle—Moose Mountain	1957, (Note: Qu'Appelle) 1972	10th term*
Simon De Jong	New Democrat	Regina East	1979	3rd term
Les Benjamin	New Democrat	Regina West	1968	6th term
Donald Ravis	Progressive Conservative	Saskatoon East	1984	1st term
**Ray Hnatyshyn**	Progressive Conservative	Saskatoon West	1974	4th term
Geoff Wilson	Progressive Conservative	Swift Current—Maple Creek	1984	1st term
John Gormley	Progressive Conservative	The Battlefords—Meadow Lake	1984	1st term
Lorne Nystrom	New Democrat	Yorkton—Melville	1968	6th term

==== Territories ====
Name	Party	Electoral district	First elected / previously elected	No. of terms
Thomas Suluk	Progressive Conservative	Nunatsiaq	1984	1st term
Dave Nickerson	Progressive Conservative	Western Arctic	1979	3rd term
**Erik Nielsen**	Progressive Conservative	Yukon	1957	11th term
Audrey McLaughlin (1987)*	New Democrat	Yukon	1987	1st term

* Erik Nielsen left parliament to become head of the National Transportation Agency and was replaced by Audrey McLaughlin in a 1987 by-election.

== Changes to party standings ==
=== By-elections ===
By-election	Date	Incumbent	Party	Winner	Party	Cause	Retained
Lac-Saint-Jean	June 20, 1988	Clément Côté	Progressive Conservative	Lucien Bouchard	Progressive Conservative	Resignation	Yes
St. John's East	July 20, 1987	James A. McGrath	Progressive Conservative	Jack Harris	New Democratic	Resignation	No
Hamilton Mountain	July 20, 1987	Ian Deans	New Democratic	Marion Dewar	New Democratic	Resignation	Yes
Yukon	July 20, 1987	Erik Nielsen	Progressive Conservative	Audrey McLaughlin	New Democratic	Resignation	No
Pembina	September 29, 1986	Peter Elzinga	Progressive Conservative	Walter van de Walle	Progressive Conservative	Resignation	Yes
Saint-Maurice	September 29, 1986	Jean Chrétien	Liberal	Gilles Grondin	Liberal	Resignation	Yes

== Legislation and motions ==
=== Act's which received royal assent under 33rd Parliament ===
==== 1st Session ====
===== Public acts (1984) =====
Date of Assent	Index	Title	Bill Number
December 20, 1984	41	Ontario and Manitoba Courts Amendment Act	C-3
December 20, 1984	42	Farm Products Marketing Agencies Act, An Act to amend the	C-4
December 20, 1984	43	Freshwater Fish Marketing Act, An Act to amend the	C-5
December 20, 1984	44	Saltfish Act, An Act to amend the	C-6
December 20, 1984	45	Income Tax Act and related statutes, An Act to amend the	C-7
December 20, 1984	46	Petroleum and Gas Revenue Tax Act, An Act to amend the	C-8
December 20, 1984	47	Customs Act and the Customs Tariff, An Act to amend the	C-9
December 20, 1984	48	Income Tax Conventions Interpretation Act	C-10
December 20, 1984	49	Foreign Extraterritorial Measures Act	C-14
December 20, 1984	50	Appropriation Act No. 3, 1984–85	C-16

===== Public acts (1985) =====
Date of Assent	Index	Title	Bill Number
February 26, 1985	1	Public Works Act and the Public Lands Grants Act, An Act to amend the	C-13
February 26, 1985	2	Currency Act, An Act to amend the	C-21
February 26, 1985	3	Excise Tax Act and the Excise Act, An Act to amend the	C-17
February 26, 1985	4	Pension Act, An Act to amend the	C-28
February 27, 1985	5	Borrowing Authority, An Act to provide	C-11
February 27, 1985	6	International Centre for Ocean Development Act	C-22
February 27, 1985	7	Western Grain Stabilization Act, An Act to amend the	C-29
March 29, 1985	8	Small Business Loans Act, An Act to amend the	C-23
March 29, 1985	9	Canadian Commercial Bank Financial Assistance Act	C-37
March 29, 1985	10	Appropriation Act No. 4, 1984–85	C-34
March 29, 1985	11	Appropriation Act No. 5, 1985–86	C-35
April 3, 1985	12	Customs Tariff, An Act to amend the	C-38
May 16, 1985	13	Crown Assets Disposal Corporation Dissolution Act	C-43
May 16, 1985	14	Customs Act and the Special Import Measures Act, An Act to confirm certain acts or things done on behalf of the Deputy Minister of National Revenue for Customs and Excise and to amend the	C-40
May 16, 1985	15	Pioneer Trust Payment Continuation Act	C-50
May 16, 1985	16	Bretton Woods Agreements Act and related amendments	C-30
May 16, 1985	17	Meat Inspection Act	C-33
May 29, 1985	18	Unemployment Insurance Act, 1971, An Act to amend the	C-52
June 20, 1985	19	Criminal Law Amendment Act, 1985	C-18
June 20, 1985	20	Investment Canada Act	C-15
June 20, 1985	21	Prairie Farm Assistance Act and related amendments	C-41
June 20, 1985	22	Sports Pool and Loto Canada Winding-Up Act	C-2
June 20, 1985	23	Income Tax (International Conventions Implementation)	S-3
June 20, 1985	24	Appropriation Act No. 2, 1985–86	C-54
June 28, 1985	25	Oil Substitution and Conservation Act and related amendments	C-24
June 28, 1985	26	Canadian Charter of Rights and Freedoms, An Act to amend certain Acts	C-27
June 28, 1985	27	Indian Act, An Act to amend the	C-31
June 28, 1985	28	Aeronautics Act, An Act to amend the	C-36
June 28, 1985	29	Supplementary Fiscal Equalization Payments 1982-87 Act	C-39
June 28, 1985	30	Old Age Security Act, An Act to amend the	C-26
June 28, 1985	31	Fisheries Act, An Act to amend the	C-32
June 28, 1985	32	Farm Improvement Loans Act, An Act to amend the	C-56
June 28, 1985	33	Fisheries Improvement Loans Act, An Act to amend the	C-57
June 28, 1985	34	Advance Payments for Crops Act, An Act to amend the	C-58
June 28, 1985	35	Northern Transportation Company Limited Disposal Authorization Act	C-53
June 28, 1985	36	Agricultural Stabilization Act, An Act to amend the	C-25
June 28, 1985	37	Borrowing Authority Act, 1985-86 (No. 2)	C-51
June 28, 1985	38	Judges Act and related Acts, An Act to amend the	C-61
June 28, 1985	39	House of Commons Act, An Act to amend the	C-63
June 28, 1985	40	Western Grain Transportation Act, An Act to amend the	C-44
October 29, 1985	41	Crown Corporations Dissolution Authorization Act	C-60
October 29, 1985	42	Customs Tariff, An Act to amend the	C-71
October 29, 1985	43	Canadian Institute for International Peace and Security Act, An Act to amend the	C-69
October 29, 1985	44	Criminal Code (pari-mutuel betting), An Act to amend the	C-77
October 29, 1985	45	Tax Court of Canada Act, An Act to amend	C-72
October 29, 1985	46	Condominium Ordinance Validation Act	C-73
December 12, 1985	47	Seeds Act and the Canada Grain Act, An Act to amend the	C-64
December 12, 1985	48	Governor General’s Act and related statutes, An Act to amend the	C-78
December 20, 1985	49	Canada Development Corporation Reorganization Act	C-66
December 20, 1985	50	Criminal Code (prostitution), An Act to amend the	C-49
December 20, 1985	51	Financial Institutions Depositors Compensation Act	C-79
December 20, 1985	52	Criminal Code (lotteries), An Act to amend the	C-81
December 20, 1985	53	Tax Rebate Discounting Act, An Act to amend the	C-83
December 20, 1985	54	Appropriation Act No. 3, 1985–86	C-89

===== Local and private acts (1985) =====
Date of Assent	Index	Title	Bill Number
December 12, 1985	55	Evangelical Lutheran Church in Canada Act	S-55

===== Public acts (1986) =====
Date of Assent	Index	Title	Bill Number
February 13, 1986	1	Customs Act	C-59
February 13, 1986	2	Petroleum and Gas Revenue Tax Act and the Income Tax Act, An Act to amend the	C-82
February 13, 1986	3	Divorce Act, An Act to amend the	C-46
February 13, 1986	4	Divorce Act, 1985	C-47
February 13, 1986	5	Family Orders and Agreements Enforcement Assistance Act	C-48
February 13, 1986	6	Income Tax Act and related statutes, An Act to amend	C-84
February 13, 1986	7	Income Tax (International Agreements Implementation)	S-6
March 4, 1986	8	Representation Act, 1985	C-74
March 4, 1986	9	Excise Tax Act and the Excise Act, An Act to amend the	C-80
March 26, 1986	10	Toronto Harbour Commissioners’ Act, 1985	C-76
March 26, 1986	11	Royal Canadian Mounted Police Act, An Act to amend the	C-65
March 26, 1986	12	Family Allowances Act, 1973, An Act to amend the	C-70
March 26, 1986	13	Immigration Act, 1976, An Act to amend the	C-55
March 26, 1986	14	Petroleum Incentives Program Act, An Act to amend the	C-85
March 26, 1986	15	Veterans and Armed Forces Benefit Acts, An Act to amend the	C-100
March 26, 1986	16	Public Pensions Reporting Act	C-255
March 26, 1986	17	Appropriation Act No. 4, 1985–86	C-101
March 26, 1986	18	Appropriation Act No. 1, 1986–87	C-102
April 23, 1986	19	Borrowing Authority Act, 1986–87	C-99
May 1, 1986	20	Canadian Arsenals Limited Divestiture Authorization Act	C-87
June 17, 1986	21	United Nations Foreign Arbitral Awards Convention Act	C-107
June 17, 1986	22	Commercial Arbitration Act	C-108
June 17, 1986	23	Grassy Narrows and Islington Indian Bands Mercury Pollution Claims Settlement Act	C-101
June 17, 1986	24	Income Tax Act, An Act to amend the	C-109
June 17, 1986	25	Canada Deposit Insurance Corporation Act, An Act to amend the	C-86
June 17, 1986	26	Competition Tribunal and related Acts, An Act to amend	C-91
June 17, 1986	27	Sechelt Indian Band Self-Government Act	C-93
June 17, 1986	28	Appropriation Act No. 2, 1986–87	C-115
June 27, 1986	29	Duties Relief Act	C-98
June 27, 1986	30	Currency Act, An Act to amend the	C-118
June 27, 1986	31	Employment Equity Act	C-62
June 27, 1986	32	Young Offenders Act and related Acts, An Act to amend the	C-106
June 27, 1986	33	Farm Debt Review Act	C-117
June 27, 1986	34	Federal-Provincial Fiscal Arrangements Act, An Act to amend the	C-96
June 27, 1986	35	Judges Act and related Acts, An Act to amend the	C-128
June 27, 1986	36	Marine Atlantic Inc. Acquisition Authorization Act	C-88
June 27, 1986	37	Customs Tariff and related amendments	C-111
June 27, 1986	38	Canada Pension Plan and the Federal Court Act, An Act to amend the	C-116
June 27, 1986	39	Energy Administration Act, An Act to amend the	C-112
June 27, 1986	40	Pension Benefits Standards Act, 1985	C-90
June 27, 1986	41	Parliamentary Employment and Staff Relations Act	C-45
July 24, 1986	42	Parole Act and the Penitentiary Act, An Act to amend the	C-67
July 24, 1986	43	Parole Act and related Acts, An Act to amend the	C-68

===== Local and private acts (1986) =====
Date of Assent	Index	Title	Bill Number
June 17, 1986	63	Pine Hill Divinity Hall, An Act to amend an Act of incorporation of	S-7

==== 2nd Session ====
===== Public acts (1986) =====
Date of Assent	Index	Title	Bill Number
November 5, 1986	44	Income Tax Act, An Act to amend the	C-11
November 18, 1986	45	Canada Petroleum Resources Act	C-5
November 18, 1986	46	Maintenance of Ports Operations Act, 1986	C-24
November 27, 1986	47	Bank of British Columbia Business Continuation Act	C-27
November 27, 1986	48	Income Tax Conventions Implementation Act (Netherlands, Japan, China, Malta)	S-2
December 19, 1986	49	Railway Act, An Act to amend the	C-4
December 19, 1986	50	Senate and House of Commons Act, An Act to amend the	C-20
December 19, 1986	51	Coastal Fisheries Protection Act, An Act to amend the	C-26
December 19, 1986	52	Farm Improvement Loans Act, An Act to amend the	C-31
December 19, 1986	53	Fisheries Improvement Loans Act, An Act to amend the	C-32
December 19, 1986	54	Excise Tax Act and the Excise Act, An Act to amend the	C-114
December 19, 1986	55	Income Tax Act and a related Act, An Act to amend the	C-23
December 19, 1986	56	Unemployment Insurance Act, 1971, An Act to amend the	C-16
December 19, 1986	57	Canadair Limited Divestiture Authorization Act	C-25
December 19, 1986	58	Petroleum and Gas Revenue Tax Act and the Income Tax Act and to repeal the Petroleum and Gas Revenue Tax Act, An Act to amend the	C-117
December 19, 1986	59	Immigration Act, 1976, An Act to amend the	C-34
December 19, 1986	60	Salaries Act, An Act to amend the	C-36
December 19, 1986	61	Appropriation Act No. 3, 1986–87	C-29
December 19, 1986	62	Appropriation Act No. 4, 1986–87	C-35

===== Local and private acts (1986) =====
Date of Assent	Index	Title	Bill Number
December 19, 1986	64	Alliance Nationale Consolidated Act, 1945, An Act to amend The	S-3

===== Public acts (1987) =====
Date of Assent	Index	Title	Bill Number
March 25, 1987	1	National Archives of Canada Act	C-7
March 25, 1987	2	Prairie Grain Advance Payments Act, An Act to amend the	C-12
March 25, 1987	3	Canada-Newfoundland Atlantic Accord Implementation Act	C-6
March 25, 1987	4	Radio Act, An Act to amend the	C-3
March 25, 1987	5	Borrowing Authority Act, 1986-87 (No. 2)	C-40
March 25, 1987	6	Appropriation Act No. 5, 1986–87	C-47
March 26, 1987	7	Canada Shipping Act and related Acts, An Act to amend the	C-39
March 26, 1987	8	Territorial Lands Act, An Act to amend the	C-43
March 26, 1987	9	Northern Canada Power Commission Yukon Assets Disposal Authorization Act	C-45
March 26, 1987	10	Appropriation Act No. 1, 1987–88	C-48
March 31, 1987	11	Appropriation Act No. 2, 1987–88	C-49
April 1, 1987	12	Teleglobe Canada Reorganization and Divestiture Act	C-38
April 14, 1987	13	Criminal Code (torture), An Act to amend the	C-28
April 14, 1987	14	Federal-Provincial Fiscal Arrangements and Federal Post-Secondary Education and Health Contributions Act, 1977, An Act to amend the	C-44
May 28, 1987	15	Softwood Lumber Products Export Charge Act	C-37
May 28, 1987	16	Export and Import Permits Act, An Act to amend the	C-57
June 25, 1987	17	Unemployment Insurance Benefit Entitlement Adjustments (Pension Payments) Act	C-50
June 25, 1987	18	Canadian Exploration and Development Incentive Program Act	C-59
June 25, 1987	19	Bell Canada Act	C-13
June 25, 1987	20	Appropriation Act No. 3, 1987–88	C-65
June 30, 1987	21	Judges Act, the Federal Court Act and the Tax Court of Canada Act, An Act to amend the	C-41
June 30, 1987	22	Shipping Conferences Exemption Act, 1987	C-21
June 30, 1987	23	Financial Institutions and Deposit Insurance System Amendment Act	C-42
June 30, 1987	24	Criminal Code and the Canada Evidence Act, An Act to amend the	C-15
June 30, 1987	25	Veterans Appeal Board Act	C-66
June 30, 1987	26	Financial institutions, An Act to amend certain Acts relating to	C-56
June 30, 1987	27	Forgiveness of Certain Official Development Assistance Debts Act	C-62
June 30, 1987	28	Small Businesses Loans Act, An Act to amend the	C-63
June 30, 1987	29	Customs Tariff and the Duties Relief Act, An Act to amend the	C-69
June 30, 1987	30	Hazardous Products Act and related Acts, An Act to amend the	C-70
June 30, 1987	31	Farm Improvement and Marketing Cooperatives Loans Act	C-78
June 30, 1987	32	Customs Act, An Act to amend the	C-80
June 30, 1987	33	Food and Drugs Act, An Act to amend the	S-6
August 28, 1987	34	National Transportation Act, 1987	C-18
August 28, 1987	35	Motor Vehicle Transport Act, 1987	C-19
August 28, 1987	36	Maintenance of Railway Operations Act, 1987	C-85
September 16, 1987	37	Criminal Code, the Immigration Act, 1976 and the Citizenship Act, An Act to amend the	C-71
October 8, 1987	38	Canagrex Dissolution Act	C-2
October 8, 1987	39	Bretton Woods and Related Agreements Act, An Act to amend the	C-68
October 16, 1987	40	Postal Services Continuation Act, 1987	C-86
November 19, 1987	41	Patent Act and related matters, An Act to amend the	C-22
November 19, 1987	42	Supreme Court Act and related Acts, An Act to amend the	C-53
December 17, 1987	43	Royal Canadian Mint Act and the Currency Act, An Act to amend the	C-46
December 17, 1987	44	Unemployment Insurance Act, 1971, An Act to amend the	C-90
December 17, 1987	45	Pension Act and related Acts, An Act to amend the	C-100
December 17, 1987	46	Income Tax Act and related Acts, An Act to amend the	C-64
December 17, 1987	47	Judges Act, An Act to amend the	C-88
December 17, 1987	48	Revised Statutes of Canada, 1985 Act	C-94
December 17, 1987	49	Customs Tariff	C-87
December 17, 1987	50	Excise Tax Act, An Act to amend the	C-101
December 17, 1987	51	Canada Labour Code, An Act to amend the	C-97
December 17, 1987	52	Hudson Bay Mining and Smelting Co., Limited, An Act to amend	C-98
December 17, 1987	53	Citizenship Act (period of residence), An Act to amend the	C-254
December 17, 1987	54	Appropriation Act No. 4, 1987–88	C-95

===== Local and private acts (1987) =====
Date of Assent	Index	Title	Bill Number
June 30, 1987	55	Windsor-Detroit Tunnel, An Act respecting the acquisition, operation and disposal of the	S-11
November 19, 1987	56	Yellowknife Electric Ltd., An Act to revive	S-10
December 17, 1987	57	Cooperants, Mutual Life Insurance Society, An Act to authorize	S-14

===== Public acts (1988) =====
Date of Assent	Index	Title	Bill Number
January 20, 1988	1	Prince Rupert Grain Handling Operations Act	C-106
February 4, 1988	2	Miscellaneous Statute Law Amendment Act, 1987	C-104
February 4, 1988	3	Appropriation Act No. 5, 1987–88	C-108
March 22, 1988	4	Corporations and Labour Unions Returns Act, An Act to amend the	C-91
March 22, 1988	5	Fruit and Vegetable Customs Orders Validation Act	C-96
March 22, 1988	6	Currency Act, An Act to amend the	C-99
March 22, 1988	7	Borrowing Authority Act, 1988–89	C-109
March 29, 1988	8	Unemployment Insurance Act, 1971, An Act to amend the	C-116
March 29, 1988	9	Appropriation Act No. 6, 1987–88	C-119
March 29, 1988	10	Appropriation Act No. 1, 1988–89	C-120
April 27, 1988	11	Emergencies Preparedness Act	C-76
April 27, 1988	12	Northern Canada Power Commission (Share Issuance and Sale Authorization) Act	C-125
May 25, 1988	13	Animal Pedigree Act	C-67
May 25, 1988	14	Customs Tariff, An Act to amend the	C-118
June 8, 1988	15	Copyright Act and related Acts, An Act to amend the	C-60
June 8, 1988	16	Western Arctic (Inuvialuit) Claims Settlement Act, An Act to amend the	C-102
June 8, 1988	17	Western Economic Diversification Act	C-113
July 1, 1988	18	Excise Tax Act and the Excise Act, An Act to amend the	C-117
July 1, 1988	19	Cape Breton Development Corporation Act, An Act to amend the	C-127
June 28, 1988	20	Tobacco Products Control Act	C-51
June 28, 1988	21	Non-smokers' Health Act	C-204
June 28, 1988	22	Canadian Environmental Protection Act	C-74
June 28, 1988	23	Indian Act (designated lands), An Act to amend the	C-115
June 28, 1988	24	Customs Tariff (code 9956), An Act to amend the	C-135
June 28, 1988	25	Appropriation Act No. 2, 1988–89	C-138
July 7, 1988	26	National Transportation Act, 1987, An Act to amend the	C-131
July 7, 1988	27	Canada Agricultural Products Act	C-141
July 21, 1988	28	Canada-Nova Scotia Offshore Petroleum Resources Accord Implementation Act	C-75
July 21, 1988	29	Emergencies Act	C-77
July 21, 1988	30	Criminal Code (victims of crime), An Act to amend the	C-89
July 21, 1988	31	Canadian Multiculturalism Act	C-93
July 21, 1988	32	National Housing Act and related Acts, An Act to amend the	C-111
July 21, 1988	33	Canada Labour Code, An Act to amend the	C-124
July 21, 1988	34	Canadian Exploration Incentive Program Act	C-137
July 21, 1988	35	Immigration Act, 1976 and related Acts, An Act to amend the	C-55
July 21, 1988	36	Immigration Act, 1976 and the Criminal Code, An Act to amend the	C-84
July 28, 1988	37	Mutual Legal Assistance in Criminal Matters Act	C-58
July 28, 1988	38	Official Languages Act	C-72
July 28, 1988	39	Indian Lands Agreement (1986) Act	C-73
July 28, 1988	40	Railway Safety Act	C-105
July 28, 1988	41	Eldorado Nuclear Limited Reorganization and Divestiture Act	C-121
July 28, 1988	42	Bretton Woods and Related Agreements Act, An Act to amend the	C-126
July 28, 1988	43	Chapleau, An Act to change the name of the electoral district of	C-308
August 18, 1988	44	Air Canada Public Participation Act	C-129
August 18, 1988	45	Western Grain Stabilization Act, An Act to amend the	C-132
August 18, 1988	46	Canada Grain Act and related Acts, An Act to amend the	C-112
August 18, 1988	47	Canadian Wheat Board Act, An Act to amend the	C-92
August 18, 1988	48	National Parks Act and related Acts, An Act to amend the	C-30
August 18, 1988	49	Quebec Courts Amendment Act	C-145
August 18, 1988	50	Government Organization Act, Atlantic Canada, 1987	C-103
September 13, 1988	51	Criminal Code, Food and Drugs Act and the Narcotic Control Act, An Act to amend the	C-61
September 13, 1988	52	Indian Act (death rules), An Act to amend the	C-150
September 13, 1988	53	Lobbyists Registration Act	C-82
September 13, 1988	54	National Capital Act, An Act to amend the	C-153
September 13, 1988	55	Income Tax Act and related Acts, An Act to amend the	C-139
September 13, 1988	56	Canadian International Trade Tribunal Act	C-110
September 13, 1988	57	Indian Act (minors' funds and surviving spouse's preferential share), An Act to amend the	C-123
September 13, 1988	58	Canadian Centre on Substance Abuse Act	C-143
September 13, 1988	59	Blue Water Bridge Authority Act, An Act to amend the	C-210
September 13, 1988	60	Criminal Code (instruments and literature for illicit drug use), An Act to amend the	C-264
September 22, 1988	61	Tax Court of Canada Act and related Acts, An Act to amend the	C-146
September 22, 1988	62	Heritage Railway Stations Protection Act	C-205
September 30, 1988	63	Unemployment Insurance Act, 1971, An Act to amend the	C-158
September 30, 1988	64	International Centre for Human Rights and Democratic Development Act	C-147

===== Local and private acts (1988) =====
Date of Assent	Index	Title	Bill Number
July 21, 1988	66	Montreal Trust Company of Canada, An Act to authorize continuance	S-17
September 30, 1988	67	Grenville Aggregate Specialties Limited, An Act to revive	S-21

== See also ==
- List of Canadian electoral districts 1976-1987 for a list of the ridings in this parliament.
