= Pembina (Alberta federal electoral district) =

Former federal electoral district in Alberta, Canada

Alberta electoral district

Defunct federal electoral district
- Legislature: House of Commons
- District created: 1966
- District abolished: 1987
- First contested: 1968
- Last contested: 1984

Pembina was a federal electoral district in Alberta, Canada, that was represented in the House of Commons of Canada from 1968 to 1988.

== History ==
This riding was created in 1966 from parts of Athabaska, Edmonton West, Jasper—Edson and Vegreville ridings.

The riding was abolished in 1987 when it was redistributed among the following ridings: Beaver River, Edmonton East, Edmonton North, Edmonton Northwest, Edmonton Southeast, Edmonton—Strathcona, Elk Island, Peace River, and St. Albert.

=== Members of Parliament ===
This riding elected the following members of Parliament:

| Parliament | Years | Member | Party |
|---|---|---|---|
Pembina; Riding created from Athabaska, Edmonton West, Jasper—Edson and Vegreville
| 28th | 1968–1972 | Jack Bigg | Progressive Conservative |
| 29th | 1972–1974 | Daniel Hollands | Progressive Conservative |
| 30th | 1974–1979 | Peter Elzinga | Progressive Conservative |
| 31st | 1979–1980 | Peter Elzinga | Progressive Conservative |
| 32nd | 1980–1984 | Peter Elzinga | Progressive Conservative |
| 33rd | 1984–1986 | Peter Elzinga | Progressive Conservative |
| 33rd | 1986–1988 | Walter van de Walle | Progressive Conservative |
Riding dissolved into Beaver River, Edmonton East, Edmonton North, Edmonton Northwest, Edmonton Southeast, Edmonton—Strathcona, Elk Island, Peace River and St. Albert

== Election results ==
Canadian federal by-election, September 29, 1986 Resignation of Peter Elzinga
| Party | Candidate | Votes | % | ±% |
|---|---|---|---|---|
| Progressive Conservative | Walter van de Walle | 16,525 | 37.02 | –33.55 |
| New Democratic | Ivor Dent | 16,251 | 36.41 | +20.71 |
| Liberal | Chris Seiersen | 6,505 | 14.57 | +2.99 |
| Independent | Doug Christie | 2,765 | 6.20 | – |
| Independent | Ernie Jamison | 1,241 | 2.78 | – |
| Confederation of Regions | Elmer Knutson | 926 | 2.08 | +0.13 |
| Independent | Anne C. McBride | 423 | 0.95 | – |
| Total valid votes | | 44,636 | 100.00 | |
| Total rejected ballots | | unknown | | |
| Turnout | | 44,636 | – | – |
| Eligible voters | | | | |
| Progressive Conservative hold | | Swing | | –27.13 |
Source: Elections Canada

1984 Canadian federal election
| Party | Candidate | Votes | % | ±% |
|---|---|---|---|---|
| Progressive Conservative | Peter Elzinga | 44,026 | 70.57 | +5.88 |
| New Democratic | Greg Daruda | 9,792 | 15.70 | +4.89 |
| Liberal | Bob Russell | 7,228 | 11.59 | –11.96 |
| Confederation of Regions | Adam Hauch | 1,215 | 1.95 | – |
| Communist | Laurent A. St. Denis | 127 | 0.20 | – |
| Total valid votes | | 62,388 | 99.83 | |
| Total rejected ballots | | 105 | 0.17 | –0.02 |
| Turnout | | 62,493 | 72.00 | +4.95 |
| Eligible voters | | 86,792 | | |
| Progressive Conservative hold | | Swing | | +8.92 |
Source: Elections Canada

1980 Canadian federal election
| Party | Candidate | Votes | % | ±% |
|---|---|---|---|---|
| Progressive Conservative | Peter Elzinga | 31,490 | 64.69 | –2.02 |
| Liberal | Leonard Doyle Nobert | 11,464 | 23.55 | +0.05 |
| New Democratic | Martin Davis | 5,260 | 10.81 | +1.01 |
| Social Credit | Ace Cetinski | 465 | 0.96 | – |
| Total valid votes | | 48,679 | 99.81 | |
| Total rejected ballots | | 94 | 0.19 | –0.08 |
| Turnout | | 48,773 | 67.05 | –5.13 |
| Eligible voters | | 72,738 | | |
| Progressive Conservative hold | | Swing | | –1.04 |
Source: Elections Canada

1979 Canadian federal election
| Party | Candidate | Votes | % | ±% |
|---|---|---|---|---|
| Progressive Conservative | Peter Elzinga | 33,722 | 66.71 | +23.16 |
| Liberal | Leonard Doyle Nobert | 11,877 | 23.50 | –4.21 |
| New Democratic | Norman T. Flach | 4,953 | 9.80 | +0.11 |
| Total valid votes | | 50,552 | 99.73 | |
| Total rejected ballots | | 137 | 0.27 | –0.03 |
| Turnout | | 50,689 | 72.18 | +0.64 |
| Eligible voters | | 70,226 | | |
| Progressive Conservative hold | | Swing | | +13.68 |
Source: Elections Canada

1974 Canadian federal election
| Party | Candidate | Votes | % | ±% |
|---|---|---|---|---|
| Progressive Conservative | Peter Elzinga | 19,172 | 43.54 | –14.58 |
| Liberal | John Borger | 12,196 | 27.70 | +3.64 |
| Not affiliated | Daniel Hollands | 7,017 | 15.94 | – |
| New Democratic | Thomas Hennessey | 4,266 | 9.69 | –4.22 |
| Social Credit | Bill Pelech | 973 | 2.21 | –0.67 |
| Communist | Neil Stenburg | 151 | 0.34 | – |
| Independent | Chuck Nelson | 131 | 0.30 | – |
| Marxist–Leninist | Peter Askin | 123 | 0.28 | – |
| Total valid votes | | 44,029 | 99.70 | |
| Total rejected ballots | | 132 | 0.30 | –1.20 |
| Turnout | | 44,161 | 71.54 | –5.16 |
| Eligible voters | | 61,731 | | |
| Progressive Conservative hold | | Swing | | –9.11 |
Source: Library of Parliament

1972 Canadian federal election
| Party | Candidate | Votes | % | ±% |
|---|---|---|---|---|
| Progressive Conservative | Daniel Hollands | 23,864 | 58.12 | –0.70 |
| Liberal | John Borger | 9,879 | 24.06 | –7.20 |
| New Democratic | Thomas Hennessey | 5,710 | 13.91 | +3.99 |
| Social Credit | Norman M. Wiwchar | 1,184 | 2.88 | – |
| Independent | Sam Davidson | 421 | 1.03 | – |
| Total valid votes | | 41,058 | 98.50 | |
| Total rejected ballots | | 624 | 1.50 | +1.04 |
| Turnout | | 41,682 | 76.70 | +3.77 |
| Eligible voters | | 54,342 | | |
| Progressive Conservative hold | | Swing | | +3.95 |
Source: Library of Parliament

1968 Canadian federal election
| Party | Candidate | Votes | % | ±% |
|---|---|---|---|---|
| Progressive Conservative | Jack Bigg | 17,578 | 58.82 | – |
| Liberal | Paul Chalifoux | 9,342 | 31.26 | – |
| New Democratic | Anne Romaniuk | 2,963 | 9.92 | – |
| Total valid votes | | 29,883 | 99.54 | |
| Total rejected ballots | | 139 | 0.46 | – |
| Turnout | | 30,022 | 72.93 | – |
| Eligible voters | | 41,167 | | |
| Progressive Conservative notional gain | | Swing | | – |
Source: Library of Parliament

== See also ==
- List of Canadian electoral districts
- Historical federal electoral districts of Canada
- Pembina (Alberta provincial electoral district)
