= Daniel Hollands =

Canadian politician (1927–2006)

Member of the Canadian Parliament for Pembina
- In office 1972–1974
- Preceded by: Jack Bigg
- Succeeded by: Peter Elzinga

Personal details
- Born: January 20, 1927 Clover Bar, Alberta, Canada
- Died: July 7, 2006 (aged 79)
- Party: Progressive Conservative
- Occupation: farmer

Daniel Hollands (January 20, 1927 – July 7, 2006) was a Canadian federal politician from 1972 to 1974.

Hollands ran for a seat in the House of Commons of Canada in the 1972 federal election, winning the district of Pembina.

He left the Progressive Conservative caucus on May 9, 1974 and ran for re-election in the 1974 federal election without party affiliation, but was defeated by Progressive Conservative candidate Peter Elzinga. Hollands finished in third place in a field of eight candidates, losing approximately 16,000 votes from the previous election.

== Electoral record ==
1972 Canadian federal election
Party	Candidate	Votes
Progressive Conservative	Daniel Hollands	23,864
Liberal	John Borger	9,879
New Democratic	Thomas Hennessey	5,710
Social Credit	Norman M. Wiwchar	1,184
Not affiliated	Sam Davidson	421

1974 Canadian federal election: Pembina
Party	Candidate	Votes	%	±%
Progressive Conservative	Peter Elzinga	19,172	43.54	–14.58
Liberal	John Borger	12,196	27.70	+3.64
Not affiliated	Daniel Hollands	7,017	15.94	–
New Democratic	Thomas Hennessey	4,266	9.69	–4.22
Social Credit	Bill Pelech	973	2.21	–0.67
Communist	Neil Stenburg	151	0.34	–
Independent	Chuck Nelson	131	0.30	–
Marxist–Leninist	Peter Askin	123	0.28	–
Total valid votes		44,029	99.70	
Total rejected ballots		132	0.30	–1.20
Turnout		44,161	71.54	–5.16
Eligible voters		61,731		
Progressive Conservative hold		Swing		–9.11
Source: Library of Parliament
