= St. Albert (federal electoral district) =

Former federal electoral district in Alberta, Canada

Alberta electoral district
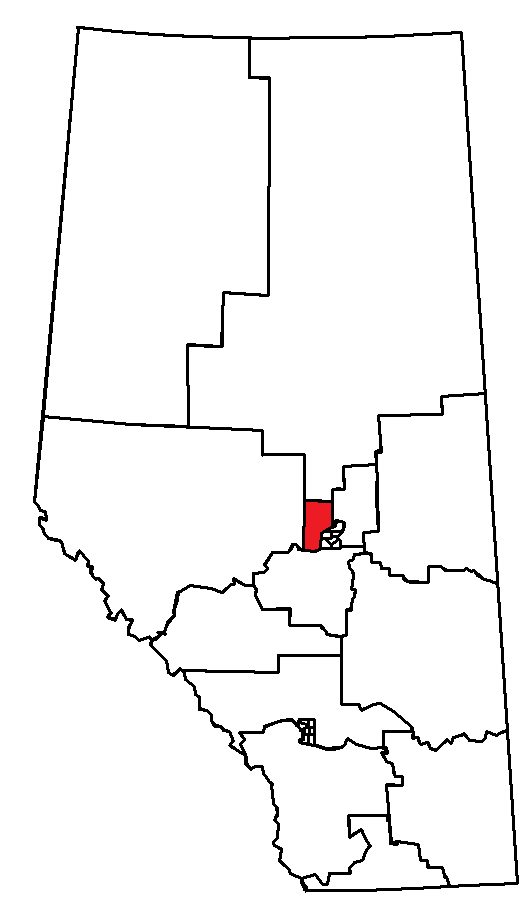
- St. Albert in relation to other federal electoral districts in Alberta (1996 redistribution)

Defunct federal electoral district
- Legislature: House of Commons
- District created: 1987
- District abolished: 2003
- First contested: 1988
- Last contested: 2000

Demographics
- Population (2001): 123,877
- Electors (2000): 83,800
- Census division(s): Division No. 11, Division No. 13

St. Albert was a federal electoral district in Alberta, Canada, that was represented in the House of Commons of Canada from 1988 to 2004. It contained Edmonton's western and northwestern suburbs, including the city of St. Albert.

== History ==
It was created in 1987 from Pembina and Yellowhead ridings. It was abolished in 2003 and transferred mostly into Edmonton—St. Albert and Edmonton—Spruce Grove. Smaller parts were transferred into Westlock—St. Paul and Yellowhead ridings.

== Geography ==
This was a rural riding in Alberta.

== Demographics ==
Population, 2001	123,877
Population, 1996	105,853
Population, 1991	95,605
Population, 1986	82,993

=== Members of Parliament ===
This riding elected the following members of Parliament:

St. Albert
Parliament	Years	Member	Party
Riding created from Pembina and Yellowhead
34th	1988–1993	Walter van de Walle	Progressive Conservative
35th	1993–1997	John G. Williams	Reform
36th	1997–2000 (Note: The Reform Party merged with the Canadian Alliance on 27 March 2000.)	John G. Williams	Reform
36th	2000–2000	John G. Williams	Alliance
37th	2000–2003 (Note: The Canadian Alliance merged with the Progressive Conservatives to form the Conservative Party on 8 December 2003.)	John G. Williams	Alliance
37th	2003–2004	John G. Williams	Conservative
Riding dissolved into Edmonton—St. Albert, Edmonton—Spruce Grove, Westlock—St. Paul and Yellowhead

== Election results ==
2000 Canadian federal election
Party	Candidate	Votes	%	±%	Expenditures
Alliance	John G. Williams	32,745	59.50	+4.31	$52,437
Liberal	Bob Russell	13,637	24.78	–3.73	$27,450
Progressive Conservative	Andy Jones	5,687	10.33	–0.23	$2,797
New Democratic	John Williams	2,965	5.39	+0.45	$1,382
Total valid votes		55,034	99.68		
Total rejected ballots		176	0.32	+0.19	
Turnout		55,210	65.88	+4.02	
Eligible voters		83,800			
Alliance hold		Swing		+4.02	
Source: Elections Canada

1997 Canadian federal election
Party	Candidate	Votes	%	±%	Expenditures
Reform	John G. Williams	24,269	55.19	+4.21	$39,524
Liberal	Doug Kennedy	12,537	28.51	+0.21	$45,461
Progressive Conservative	Mike Partington	4,645	10.56	–1.39	$20,713
New Democratic	Jim Connelly	2,172	4.94	+2.01	$6,710
Independent	Steven Powers	354	0.81	–	$3,673
Total valid votes		43,977	99.87		
Total rejected ballots		58	0.13	–0.02	
Turnout		44,035	61.86	–8.83	
Eligible voters		71,184			
Reform hold		Swing		+2.00	
Source: Elections Canada

^ Change is from redistributed results

1993 federal election redistributed results
Party	Vote	%
Reform	24,632	50.97
Liberal	13,674	28.30
Progressive Conservative	5,778	11.96
Others	2,827	5.85
New Democratic	1,413	2.92

1993 Canadian federal election
Party	Candidate	Votes	%	±%
Reform	John G. Williams	24,964	50.94	+37.00
Liberal	Jack Jeffery	13,860	28.28	+11.56
Progressive Conservative	Jerry Manegre	5,884	12.01	–34.71
National	Steven Powers	2,219	4.53	–
New Democratic	Zahid Makhdoom	1,435	2.93	–16.68
Christian Heritage	Rudy Penner	294	0.60	–1.52
Natural Law	Richard Day	257	0.52	–
Not affiliated	Jennifer Vallee	90	0.18	–
Total valid votes		49,003	99.85	
Total rejected ballots		75	0.15	+0.02
Turnout		49,078	70.69	–8.69
Eligible voters		69,430		
Reform gain from Progressive Conservative		Swing		+35.85
Source: Elections Canada

1988 Canadian federal election
Party	Candidate	Votes	%	±%
Progressive Conservative	Walter van de Walle	19,945	46.72	–
New Democratic	Dennis Pawlowski	8,370	19.60	–
Liberal	Kent Davidson	7,140	16.72	–
Reform	Ken Allred	5,955	13.95	–
Christian Heritage	Dwayne O'Coin	904	2.12	–
Rhinoceros	Hermann S. Kleen	197	0.46	–
Not affiliated	Edward Goodliffe	127	0.30	–
Confederation of Regions	Curtis L. Schoepp	57	0.13	–
Total valid votes		42,695	99.87	
Total rejected ballots		55	0.13	–
Turnout		42,750	79.38	–
Eligible voters		53,853		
Progressive Conservative notional gain		Swing		–
Source: Elections Canada

== See also ==
- List of Canadian electoral districts
- Historical federal electoral districts of Canada
