= Jack Bigg =

Canadian politician

Frederick Johnstone (Jack) Bigg
- Official 1968 portrait

Member of the Canadian House of Commons
- In office 1958–1968
- Preceded by: Joseph Miville Dechene
- Succeeded by: Paul Yewchuk
- Constituency: Athabaska
- In office 1968–1972
- Preceded by: New district
- Succeeded by: Daniel Hollands
- Constituency: Pembina

Personal details
- Born: May 26, 1912 Meskanaw, Saskatchewan
- Died: April 16, 1975 (aged 62)
- Party: Progressive Conservative
- Occupation: RCMP officer, lawyer

Frederick Johnstone "Jack" Bigg (May 26, 1912 – April 16, 1975) was a police officer who had obtained the rank of sergeant in the Royal Canadian Mounted Police. He was also a lawyer, and served as a Canadian federal politician from 1958 to 1972.

== Political career ==
Bigg first ran for a seat in the House of Commons of Canada in the 1958 federal election. He defeated three other candidates to win the Athabaska electoral district. Bigg ran for re-election in the 1962 federal election, once again he defeated three other candidates in a closely contested race to win a second term in office.

Parliament was dissolved a year later after the minority government fell forcing the 1963 federal election. Bigg ran for a third term in office and was returned in a landslide defeating two former Alberta MLAs Richard Hall and Peter Chaba and another candidate.

Bigg stood for a fourth term and was re-elected in yet another landslide in the 1965 federal election. Bigg then ran in the new Pembina electoral district in the 1968 federal election. He won the largest plurality of his career and was re-elected to his fifth and final term in office. He retired in 1972.
