= Michael Maccagno =

Canadian politician (1914–2000)

Leader of the Official Opposition in Alberta
- In office February 13, 1964 – April 11, 1967
- Preceded by: 5 year vacancy, (last Grant MacEwan)
- Succeeded by: Peter Lougheed

Leader of the Alberta Liberal Party
- In office 1964–1966
- Preceded by: Dave Hunter
- Succeeded by: Adrian Berry
- In office 1966–1968
- Preceded by: Adrian Berry
- Succeeded by: John T. Lowery

Member of the Legislative Assembly of Alberta
- In office June 29, 1955 – May 27, 1968
- Preceded by: Harry Lobay
- Succeeded by: Damase Bouvier
- Constituency: Lac La Biche

Personal details
- Born: July 15, 1914 Piozzo, Piedmont, Italy
- Died: November 25, 2000 (aged 86) Lac La Biche, Alberta
- Party: Liberal
- Spouse: Valentine Lebas
- Occupation: businessman, politician

Michael Maccagno (July 15, 1914 – November 25, 2000) was a politician from Alberta, Canada. He served as a Member of the Legislative Assembly of Alberta from 1955 to 1968, and leader of the Alberta Liberal Party from 1964 to 1968.

== Political career ==
Mr. Maccagno ran for a seat to the Alberta legislature in the 1955 provincial election as a candidate for the Alberta Liberals in the electoral district of Lac La Biche. He defeated incumbent Social Credit MLA Harry Lobay by less than 100 votes. When he was re-elected in 1959, he was the only Liberal with a seat in the legislature.

In 1964, when Liberal leader Dave Hunter resigned after failing twice to win a seat in the legislature, Maccagno became interim leader of the Alberta Liberals as well as Leader of the Official Opposition. He became the first Italian Canadian to become head of a major political party in Canada. In 1966 Calgary Alderman Adrian Berry was chosen as Liberal leader, but resigned shortly after, leaving Maccagno to resume the leadership.

Mr. Maccagno lead the Liberals into the 1967 general election. The party lost over 8% of its popular vote from the last election, but kept all three seats it held on dissolution. The Liberals became the third party after Peter Lougheed's Progressive Conservatives.

Mr. Maccagno resigned his seat in the Alberta legislature on May 27, 1968, to run in that year's federal election. He ran for the federal Liberals in the electoral district of Athabasca and lost to Progressive Conservative candidate Paul Yewchuk by about 1,200 votes. After the election he was appointed to the National Parole Board.
