= Alberta Liberal Party =

Provincial political party in Canada

Coordinates: 53.5445°N 113.5356°W

- Leader: John Roggeveen (outgoing)
- President: K.S. Chan
- Founded: 1905; 121 years ago
- Headquarters: PO Box 94098 Elbow River; Calgary, Alberta; T2S 0S4
- Membership (2016): 3,000–4,000
- Ideology: Liberalism (Canadian)
- Political position: Centre
- National affiliation: Liberal Party of Canada (until 1976)
- Colours: Red
- Seats in Legislature: 0 / 87

Website
- albertaliberal.com

The Alberta Liberal Party (French: Parti libéral de l'Alberta) is a provincial political party in Alberta, Canada. Founded in 1905, it is the oldest active political party in Alberta and was the dominant political party until the 1921 election, with the first three provincial Premiers being Liberals. Since 1921, it has formed the official opposition in the Legislative Assembly of Alberta several times, most recently from 1993 until 2012. Fourteen Liberals have served as Leader of the Opposition of Alberta.

It was affiliated with the Liberal Party of Canada until 1976.

The party supports expanded oil and gas market access with pipelines, reducing and capping classroom sizes, protection of water supplies, funding for mental health, and investment in renewable energy.

On social issues, it supports reproductive freedom, affordable childcare, pay equity legislation, and free addiction counselling.

== History ==
=== Early years ===
The Alberta Liberal Party was formed on September 1, 1905. The Liberals formed the government in Alberta for the first 16 years of the province's existence. Alexander C. Rutherford (1905–1910), Arthur L. Sifton (1910–1917) and Charles Stewart (1917–1921) led Liberal governments, until the party was swept from office in the 1921 election by the United Farmers of Alberta.

=== 1921: Loss of power ===
When Premier Charles Stewart resigned as leader after his government's defeat at the hands of the United Farmers of Alberta in the 1921 election, John R. Boyle, a former Attorney-General, led the legislative caucus until he was appointed to the judiciary in 1924, and Charles R. Mitchell, also a former cabinet minister succeeded him. John C. Bowen acted in the interim until a party convention chose Joseph Tweed Shaw, a former independent left-wing M.P.

In the lead-up to the 1930 election, the party chose George H. Webster, M.L.A. for Calgary City. He resigned in favour of William R. Howson, who led the party energetically if unsuccessfully in 1935. After he was appointed to the provincial superior court in 1936, Edward Leslie Gray succeeded him.

=== Unity coalition ===
Discussions on a coalition of opposition forces began in the early thirties to put together a strong opposition to the United Farmers government. The Liberals refused to join when their fortunes were going up during the leadership William Howson. At the height of Liberal popularity they had managed to lure two United Farmers MLAs to sit in the Liberal caucus.

After the defeat of old line parties by Social Credit in the 1935 Alberta general election, the coalition idea picked up steam. Edward Gray, Liberal leader cautiously entered the party into the Unity Movement giving riding associations the opportunity to support Liberal candidates or Independent candidates.

The Alberta Liberals were tepid to support the Independent Citizens' Association led by John Percy Page. They wanted the Independents to remain independent and were against having a new party formed based on the coalition. The Liberals maintained the party organization by keeping the Constituency Associations and Party Executive Intact. After Gray resigned the leadership on April 19, 1941, to accept a patronage position the party did not officially replace him as leader until James Prowse in 1947.

The President of the Party who stood for election annually, became the official face of the party in all matters of party business. The party also kept a rump caucus from 1940 to 1944 that started out with one member and got to three by dissolution in 1944. The Liberals despite internal pressure to break with the coalition agreed not to run candidates in the 1944 election.

Cooperation with the Independents officially came to an end when the federal Camrose riding association passed a motion at a meeting in August 1945 calling on the executive of the provincial Liberal party to reorganize in all Alberta provincial constituencies free of alliances and arrangements with other parties.

The party held a meeting on January 7, 1946, to discuss proposals to participate in the 1948 Alberta general election.

=== Post-war ===
Prowse became the first true leader of the party in the post coalition era. He led the party from 1947 to 1958 leading to significant gains in popular votes and seats. He resigned the leadership to run for Mayor of Edmonton, and was succeeded by John Walter Grant MacEwan, M.L.A. for Calgary City. MacEwan was beset by problems entirely beyond his ability to control. The electoral ability of any opposition party leader became very chancy with the abolition of the STV electoral system used for Edmonton and Calgary cities.

The Manning government had successfully renewed and reinvigorated itself, and recovered much of the ground it had previously lost, while the recent Diefenbaker landslide made the Progressive Conservative Party seem a more attractive vehicle for the party's traditional supporters.

MacEwan was the first of many leaders who faced a problem similar to those of Liberals in Britain and other Western Canadian provinces. Ideologically, the party was being squeezed between traditional conservatism and social democracy. In a social sense, the party presented an older and more traditional image in comparison to the Alberta Progressive Conservatives, who, given the predominance of Social Credit, seemed fairly liberal. Almost inevitably, the Liberals were reduced to a single member, Michael Maccagno of Lac La Biche. MacEwan retired shortly after this disaster.

=== 1960s ===
He was succeeded by David B. Hunter, then mayor of Athabasca, who campaigned aggressively on the creation of a publicly owned electrical power company, with strong environmentalist overtones. This likely limited any growth by the Alberta New Democrats in the 1963 election, and it established the party with a distinct image and identity separate from the Progressive Conservatives. However, it was internally divisive, and a number of candidates, including one of its two successful ones, repudiated the platform's main plank. Hunter himself was defeated personally in Athabasca. He did not resign until after he lost a later byelection, when he decided to run for Parliament (unsuccessfully).

Maccagno, who was leader of the minuscule opposition in the Legislature, served as interim leader, but did not regard himself as leadership material. In a convention which exposed the deep ideological fault lines within the party, Adrian Douglas Berry, a Calgary alderman, emerged as leader from a highly acrimonious contest. Internal dissensions continued, and late in 1966, Berry resigned under circumstances still not explained. As a provincial election could be expected within months, Maccagno became leader almost by default, and somewhat unwillingly led the party into the 1967 provincial election.

Maccagno was elected, the first Liberal leader since 1955 and the last until 1986 to achieve the feat and the party increased its representation from two to three seats. However, the party placed fourth in the popular vote. Peter Lougheed and the Progressive Conservatives presented the attraction of a modern, urban-based party which was decidedly more liberal than the Social Credit government. The Tories displaced the Liberals as the apparent alternative to the Socreds.

=== Shut out ===
The next four years were a bad time for the Liberals. The party placed very poorly in a byelection to replace a Liberal MLA who had died, and the party had lost its other two seats when Maccagno resigned to run in the 1968 federal election and then in November 1969, the last remaining Liberal MLA, Bill Dickie, crossed the floor to join Lougheed's Progressive Conservatives, who had rapidly established themselves as a credible government-in-waiting.

In 1969, the party chose a Calgary clergyman turned businessman, John T. Lowery, to succeed Maccagno. Lowery thought he saw some hope in an electoral arrangement with Social Credit, which he believed was showing signs of modernization and rejuvenation under Manning's successor, Harry Strom. He was likely encouraged in this by the two federal ministers from Alberta, Bud Olson and Pat Mahoney, both former Socreds. When word of negotiations to that effect came out, it became evident that any such proposal was deeply opposed by the core membership of both parties. Lowery resigned in the face of it.

The following year saw the provincial Liberals come very close to extinction. The party's political credibility had been steadily eroding, and with the negotiations with Social Credit, it was not immediately clear that it had any ideological purpose. There was much discussion of the party abandoning provincial politics altogether (there was only one organization at federal and provincial levels), and concentrating on federal politics, which looked a great deal more hopeful at the time than they did two years later.

It took a major act of will for the party to decide to soldier on as an independent force, which it did in repudiating Lowery, and deciding to contest the 1971 election, however hopeless the prospects might be. The party chose, almost by default, Robert Russell of St. Albert, a highly controversial figure who had been passed over twice, but who had a strong desire for the position, and who had strongly supported David Hunter's vision for the party.

The party suffered as bad a defeat as anyone could have expected in the 1971 election. It was shut out of the legislature altogether in an election that saw Social Credit defeated after 36 years in power at the hands of Lougheed's Progressive Conservatives.

It is widely argued that the provincial Liberals' popularity in Alberta was especially hurt during the federal government of Pierre Trudeau's Liberal Party of Canada between 1968 and 1984. Trudeau's policies were unpopular in western Canada and especially in Alberta, particularly official bilingualism, and the National Energy Program (NEP), which exacerbated feelings of western alienation. During this period, the provincial Liberal party suffered because of its connections with its federal cousins.

=== 1986: Return to the legislature ===
The Liberals' fortunes improved in the late 1980s and they returned to the Alberta legislature in the 1986 election, when leader Nicholas Taylor led them to win 4 seats and 12% of the popular vote. Following the 1987 leadership review, a leadership contest was held in 1988.

The race was contested by Taylor, MLA, Sheldon Chumir, MLA, Grant Mitchell, and Edmonton Mayor Laurence Decore. Decore was elected leader of the party on a first ballot victory.

The Alberta Liberal Party ran one candidate in the 1989 Senate Election, Bill Code, who finished with 22.5% of the vote.

=== The party in the 1990s ===
In the 1993 election, the Liberals, under former Edmonton mayor Laurence Decore, enjoyed their greatest success since holding power when they swept Edmonton, winning a total of 32 seats, and collecting 39% of the popular vote. This enabled the party to displace the New Democrats to become the Official Opposition to the Progressive Conservative government of Ralph Klein.

Although Decore now led the second-largest opposition caucus in the province's history, the result was still seen as a disappointment to some prominent Liberals who felt the party had missed its best chance in over 70 years to form government. Under increasing pressure, Decore resigned the leadership in 1994. Four MLAs contested the race to succeed him: Edmonton McClung MLA Grant Mitchell, Fort McMurray MLA Adam Germain, Edmonton-Roper MLA Sine Chadi, and Calgary-Buffalo MLA Gary Dickson. After all the ballots had been counted, Mitchell was elected as party leader.

The party continued to hold its position as Official Opposition, but lost 10 seats in the 1997 election. With 18 seats in the Alberta legislature, Mitchell resigned as leader, and another race was declared.

The 1998 leadership race also saw four contestants: former Progressive Conservative cabinet minister Nancy MacBeth, Lethbridge East MLA Ken Nicol, Edmonton Meadowlark MLA Karen Leibovici, and Edmonton Riverview MLA Linda Sloan. MacBeth was elected on the first ballot.

=== The 2000s ===
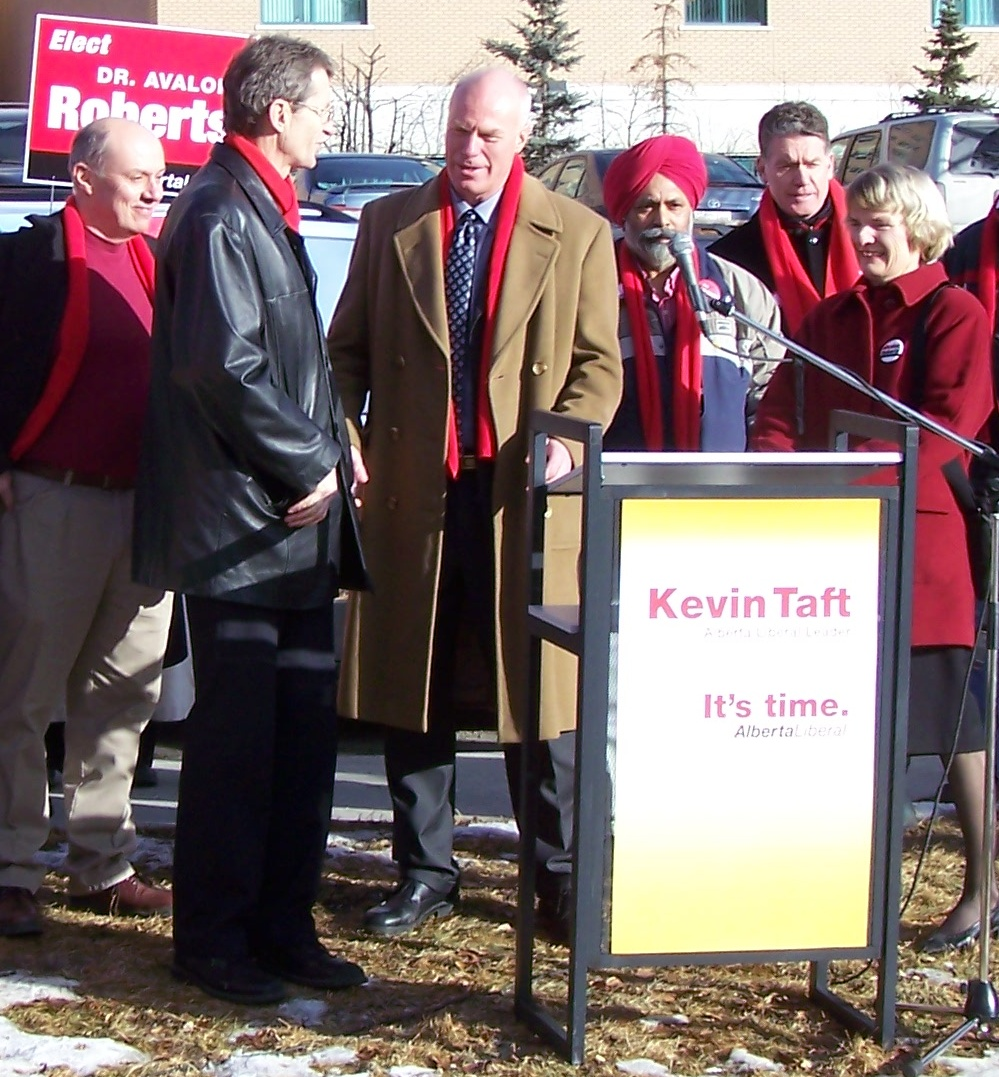
Liberal candidates at a press conference in Calgary during the 2008 election (left-to-right): Dave Taylor, David Swann, Kevin Taft, Darshan Kang, Harry B. Chase, and Avalon Roberts

In the 2001 election, MacBeth led a campaign which ended with only seven Liberal MLAs being elected. MacBeth also lost her own seat in the election.

In the days following the 2001 election, MacBeth resigned and Ken Nicol was acclaimed leader. Nicol led the party until 2004, when he ran for the federal Liberal Party of Canada in the Lethbridge riding. Edmonton Mill Woods MLA Don Massey briefly stood as interim leader until a leadership race was held.

On March 27, 2004, Kevin Taft was elected the new leader of the Alberta Liberal Party. In the 2004 provincial election, the Liberals more than doubled their seats to 16 and increased their share of the popular vote to 29%. More significantly, and to the surprise of most observers, the Liberals were able to win three seats in the traditionally conservative city of Calgary. Additionally, in June 2007, Craig Cheffins won in a by-election, making him the fourth Alberta Liberal MLA in Calgary.

The provincial election of March 3, 2008, proved to be another setback for the party. Going up against rookie Premier Ed Stelmach, the Alberta Liberals had high hopes of increasing their seat count dramatically, particularly with the supposed discontent with the Tories in Calgary. However, the result was humbling for the Alberta Liberals. The party ended with only nine seats, down from 16 when the election was called. The party's power based in Edmonton was hit especially hard, with eight seats won in 2004 going Conservative. On June 26, 2008, Taft announce his intention to resign as leader. Dr. David Swann was elected as the new Liberal leader on December 13, 2008, defeating two other contenders on the first ballot.

After serving as leader for three years on February 1, 2011, Swann announced his resignation as leader. The 2011 leadership election saw another doctor, Dr. Raj Sherman, win the leadership of the party, who then went on to lead the party into the 2012 general election.

=== Recent history ===
In the 2012 general election, the Liberals dropped from eight seats in the legislature to five, becoming the third party in the legislature behind the Progressive Conservatives and the Wildrose Party. Sherman announced his resignation as leader on January 26, 2015, effective immediately. Calgary-Mountain View MLA and former leader David Swann was named interim leader on February 1, 2015, chosen over Edmonton-Centre MLA Laurie Blakeman in a vote by the party's board of directors.

Although still interim leader, Swann led the party into the 2015 provincial election in which the Alberta New Democratic Party swept to power with a majority government, defeating the Progressive Conservatives after 44 years. The Liberal Party was reduced from five seats to one, with Swann becoming the party's sole MLA.

In the leadership election of 2017, lawyer and former Calgary-Buffalo candidate David Khan received 54.8% of the votes, defeating one rival to become the permanent Liberal leader. Under his leadership, the Liberals were shut out of the legislature in the 2019 provincial election for the first time since 1982 and received their worst vote share since 1971. Khan resigned from the leadership on November 22, 2020.

On March 6, 2021, John Roggeveen was selected by the board of directors as the interim leader. The August 12, 2022 deadline for nominations for the party's leadership election passed with no candidates signing up to run for the position. On December 8, 2022, Roggeveen was appointed the permanent leader of the party.

In the 2023 general election, the party received the lowest vote share in its history with just 0.24%, which was thought to be due in part to the federal Liberals' very high unpopularity in the province, even though both parties have no connection with each other, sharing only a name and a similar platform. Talk has begun within the party to potentially change its name to distance itself more from the federal Liberals, similar to when BC United changed its name from the BC Liberal Party (BC United is actually on the centre-right of the political spectrum) and when the Saskatchewan Progress Party changed its name from the Liberal Party of Saskatchewan.

In December 2025, Roggeveen announced that he would be resigning as party leader "effective on the date a new leader is either elected or appointed."

== Party policies ==
Economic policy:

- Reduce post-secondary tuition fees by a third, eliminate mandatory non-instructional fees, and move to a grant-based system versus student loans for financial aid
- Implement progressive taxation
- Opening government contracts to a bidding process that is accessible to the public with disclosure of all government contracts over $10,000
- Investing in a high-speed rail and other infrastructure connecting Edmonton, Red Deer, and Calgary

Social policy:

- Investing in community, school-based hubs across Alberta that tie the health, educational, and social needs of communities
- Eliminate subsidies to private schools and roll some schools into the public systems
- Not providing resources to enforce cannabis laws in cases of small amounts of possession
- Sustainable and substantially increased funding for Legal Aid Alberta
- Implementing a $10 a day learn through play program throughout Alberta

Environmental policy:

- Elimination of the use of coal as an energy source for electricity in Alberta
- Support of the Experimental Lakes Area
- Implementing a carbon tax

== Party leaders ==
Name	Took Over	Date Left	Note
Alexander Rutherford	1905	1910	First Premier of Alberta
Arthur Sifton	1910	1917	Second Premier of Alberta
Charles Stewart	1917	1922	Third Premier of Alberta
John Boyle	1922	1924	Leader of the Opposition
Charles R. Mitchell	1924	1926	
John C. Bowen	1926	1926	
Joseph Tweed Shaw	1926	1930	Resigned
John McDonald	March 28, 1930	March 1, 1932	Did not hold a seat in the Assembly
George Webster	1931	March 1, 1932	Leader of Liberal caucus in the Assembly
George Webster	March 1, 1932	October 21, 1932	Interim Leader
William Howson	October 21, 1932	March 2, 1937	Appointed to the Supreme Court of Alberta
Edward Leslie Gray	March 2, 1937	April 19, 1941	
Robert Barrowman	April 19, 1941	September 27, 1941	Party leadership remained vacant from Gray's resignation until James Prowse was chosen as leader. The President of the Liberals maintained the day-to-day operations of the Liberals during the Unity Coalition.
Hugh John Montgomery	September 27, 1941	1946	Party leadership remained vacant from Gray's resignation until James Prowse was chosen as leader. The President of the Liberals maintained the day-to-day operations of the Liberals during the Unity Coalition.
Wesley Stambaugh	1946	June 26, 1947	Party leadership remained vacant from Gray's resignation until James Prowse was chosen as leader. The President of the Liberals maintained the day-to-day operations of the Liberals during the Unity Coalition.
James Prowse	June 26, 1947	1958	
Grant MacEwan	November 1, 1958	1960	
Michael Maccagno	1960	1962	Leader of Liberal caucus in the Assembly
David Hunter	1962	1964	
Michael Maccagno	1964	January 15, 1966	Interim Leader
Adrian Douglas Berry	January 15, 1966	November 7, 1966	
Michael Maccagno	November 7, 1966	1969	
John T. Lowery	1969	1970	
Robert Russell	1971	1974	
Nicholas Taylor	1974	1988	
Laurence Decore	1988	1994	
Bettie Hewes	1994	1994	Interim Leader
Grant Mitchell	1994	1998	
Nancy MacBeth	1998	2001	
Ken Nicol	2001	2004	
Don Massey	2004	2004	Interim Leader
Kevin Taft	2004	December 13, 2008	
David Swann	December 13, 2008	September 10, 2011	
Raj Sherman	September 10, 2011	January 26, 2015	Led the party through the 2012 election
David Swann	February 1, 2015	June 4, 2017	Returned as Interim Leader, and led the party through the 2015 election
David Khan	June 4, 2017	November 22, 2020	
John Roggeveen	March 6, 2021	December 8, 2022	Interim Leader
John Roggeveen	December 8, 2022		Permanent leader

== Election results ==
=== Legislative Assembly ===
Election	Leader	Votes	%	Seats	+/–	Position	Status
1905	Alexander Cameron Rutherford	14,485	57.56	22 / 25		1st	Majority
1909	Alexander Cameron Rutherford	29,634	59.26	36 / 41	▲14	1st	Majority
1913	Arthur Sifton	47,748	49.23	39 / 56	▲3	1st	Majority
1917	Arthur Sifton	54,212	48.14	34 / 58	▼5	1st	Majority
1921	Charles Stewart	86,250	28.92	15 / 61	▼19	▼2nd	Opposition
1926	Joseph Tweed Shaw	47,450	26.17	7 / 60	▼12	2nd	Opposition
1930	John W. McDonald	46,275	24.59	11 / 63	▲4	2nd	Opposition
1935	William R. Howson	69,845	23.14	5 / 63	▼6	2nd	Opposition
1940	Edward Leslie Gray	2,755	0.89	1 / 57	▼5	▼4th	Fourth party
1944	Did not contest						
1948	James Harper Prowse	52,655	17.86	2 / 57	▲2	▲3rd	Third party
1952	James Harper Prowse	66,738	22.37	3 / 60	▲1	▲2nd	Opposition
1955	James Harper Prowse	117,741	31.13	15 / 61	▲12	2nd	Opposition
1959	Grant MacEwan	57,408	13.88	1 / 65	▼14	▼3rd	Third party
1963	Dave Hunter	79,709	19.76	2 / 63	▲1	▲2nd	Opposition
1967	Michael Maccagno	53,847	10.81	3 / 65	▲1	▼3rd	Third party
1971	Bob Russell	6,475	1.01	0 / 75	▼2	▼4th	No seats
1975	Nicholas Taylor	29,424	4.98	0 / 75	Steady	4th	No seats
1979	Nicholas Taylor	43,792	6.16	0 / 79	Steady	4th	No seats
1982	Nicholas Taylor	17,074	1.81	0 / 79	Steady	4th	No seats
1986	Nicholas Taylor	87,239	12.22	4 / 83	▲4	▲3rd	Third party
1989	Laurence Decore	237,787	28.68	8 / 83	▲4	3rd	Third party
1993	Laurence Decore	392,899	39.73	32 / 83	▲28	▲2nd	Opposition
1997	Grant Mitchell	309,748	32.75	18 / 83	▼14	2nd	Opposition
2001	Nancy MacBeth	276,854	27.33	7 / 83	▼11	2nd	Opposition
2004	Kevin Taft	261,471	29.4	16 / 83	▲8	2nd	Opposition
2008	Kevin Taft	251,158	26.43	9 / 83	▼7	2nd	Opposition
2012	Raj Sherman	127,645	9.89	5 / 87	▼4	▼3rd	Third party
2015	David Swann	62,171	4.19	1 / 87	▼4	▼4th	No status
2019	David Khan	18,546	0.98	0 / 87	▼1	4th	No seats
2023	John Roggeveen	4,259	0.24	0 / 87	Steady	▼7th	No seats

=== Alberta Senate nominee elections ===
Election	Votes	%	Elected
1989	139,809	22.5	0 / 1

== See also ==
- List of Alberta Liberal leadership conventions
- Alberta Liberal Party candidates in the 2012 Alberta provincial election
- List of Alberta general elections
- List of Canadian political parties

== Notes ==
Preceded by Liberal-Conservative Party	Governing party of Alberta; 1905–1921	Succeeded by United Farmers of Alberta
