= Adrian Douglas Berry =

Canadian politician

Leader of the Alberta Liberal Party
- In office January 15, 1966 – November 7, 1966
- Preceded by: Michael Maccagno
- Succeeded by: Michael Maccagno

Personal details
- Born: August 3, 1922 Millet, Alberta, Canada
- Died: June 16, 2007 (aged 84) Red Deer, Alberta, Canada
- Party: Liberal
- Spouse(s): Muriel (d. 1992), Connie Borgstrom (his death)
- Occupation: politician

Adrian Douglas Berry (August 3, 1922 – June 16, 2007) was an Alberta politician who led the Alberta Liberal Party in 1966.

== Biography ==
Berry was born in Millet, Alberta. At 17, he enlisted in the Canadian Army during World War II and served as a tank commander in Italy and North Africa until he was injured and evacuated to England.

After the war, Berry earned his Bachelor of Education at the University of Alberta and taught briefly in Edmonton before joining the National Life Assurance Company, eventually becoming an executive. He later moved to Calgary and, in 1964, was elected to Calgary City Council as alderman for Ward 3 and served in that position for nine years. In the 1965 federal election, Berry was the Liberal Party of Canada's candidate in Calgary North where he came in second, losing to incumbent Douglas Harkness by almost 7,000 votes.

He contested the leadership of the Alberta Liberal Party and, on January 15, 1966, won the party's leadership convention narrowly on the third ballot. The party was deeply divided, however, and Berry resigned the party's leadership on November 7, 1966.

Berry formed a consulting firm that specialized in management services for associations and societies and also served as executive director of the Alberta Optometric Association and the Opportunity "45" Society.
