= Peter Elzinga =

Canadian politician (1944–2023)

The Honourable Peter Elzinga ECA

Member of the Canadian Parliament for Pembina
- In office 1974–1986
- Preceded by: Daniel Hollands
- Succeeded by: Walter van de Walle

Member of the Legislative Assembly of Alberta for Sherwood Park
- In office May 8, 1986 – June 14, 1993
- Preceded by: Riding established
- Succeeded by: Bruce Collingwood

Alberta Minister of Agriculture
- In office May 26, 1986 – April 13, 1989
- Premier: Don Getty
- Preceded by: LeRoy Fjordbotten
- Succeeded by: Ernie Isley

Alberta Minister of Economic Development and Trade
- In office April 14, 1989 – December 14, 1992
- Premier: Don Getty
- Preceded by: Larry Shaben
- Succeeded by: Donald H. Sparrow

Deputy Premier of Alberta
- In office December 15, 1992 – June 29, 1993
- Premier: Ralph Klein
- Preceded by: Jim Horsman
- Succeeded by: Ken Kowalski

Alberta Minister of Federal and Intergovernmental Affairs
- In office December 15, 1992 – June 29, 1993
- Premier: Ralph Klein
- Preceded by: Jim Horsman
- Succeeded by: Ralph Klein

Personal details
- Born: April 6, 1944 Edmonton, Alberta, Canada
- Died: November 8, 2023 (aged 79) Edmonton, Alberta, Canada
- Party: Progressive Conservative Association of Alberta
- Other political affiliations: Progressive Conservative Party of Canada

Peter Elzinga ECA (April 6, 1944 – November 8, 2023) was a Canadian politician. He was the executive director of the Alberta's Progressive Conservative Party, a member of Parliament, and cabinet minister in the Legislative Assembly of Alberta.

Elzinga was born in Edmonton, the son of Susan Laanstra and Peter Elzinga. A farmer and rancher by training, Elzinga was first elected to the House of Commons as the Progressive Conservative in the 1974 federal election representing Pembina. He served as president of the Progressive Conservative Party of Canada from 1983 to 1986 and was chair of the 1983 PC leadership convention.

Elzinga resigned his seat in the House of Commons to run in the 1986 Alberta provincial election. He was elected to the Legislative Assembly of Alberta as the member for Sherwood Park and joined the cabinet of Don Getty as minister of agriculture. In April 1989, he became minister of economic development and trade, a post he held until December 1992.

Elzinga co-chaired Ralph Klein's successful bid to win the leadership of the Alberta PC Party in 1992, and subsequently became deputy premier and minister of federal and intergovernmental affairs. Elzinga did not run for re-election in 1993 provincial election. He chaired the PC Party's election campaign that year, and the subsequent campaigns in the 1997, 2001 and 2004 provincial elections. Elzinga returned from the private sector to serve as Klein's chief of staff from 1998 to 2004.

In 2018, Elzinga joined Atlas Growers as Chairman of the Board of Directors.

Elzinga died on November 8, 2023, at the age of 79.

Parliament of Canada
Preceded by Daniel Hollands	Member of Parliament for Pembina; 1974–1986	Succeeded by Walter van de Walle
Legislative Assembly of Alberta
Preceded by Riding established	MLA for Sherwood Park; 1986–1993	Succeeded by Bruce Collingwood
