= John G. Williams (Canadian politician) =

Canadian politician (1946–2024)

Member of Parliament for Edmonton—St. Albert
- In office October 25, 1993 – October 14, 2008
- Preceded by: Walter Van De Walle
- Succeeded by: Brent Rathgeber

Personal details
- Born: December 31, 1946 Aberdeenshire, Scotland
- Died: July 15, 2024 (aged 77)
- Party: Conservative
- Spouse: Christine Botchway
- Profession: Accountant

John Glass Williams (December 31, 1946 – July 15, 2024) was a Canadian politician who was a Conservative Member of Parliament, representing Edmonton—St. Albert from 1993 to 2008. Originally associated with the Reform Party, he was a member of the Conservatives since its formation in 2003.

== Life and career ==
Williams was born in Aberdeenshire, Scotland on December 31, 1946. He was a long-time chair of the Public Accounts Committee in the House of Commons of Canada.

In August 2006, he announced that he would not be seeking re-election in the next federal election.

Williams died on July 15, 2024, at the age of 77.

Political offices
Preceded by Michel Guimond	Chairman of the Public Accounts Committee; 1997–2005	Succeeded by Shawn Murphy
