= John Borger (Canadian football) =

Canadian football player

Profile
- Positions: Center, End

Personal information
- Born: c. 1935 (age 90–91); Lymburn, Alberta, Canada
- Listed height: 6 ft 0 in (1.83 m)
- Listed weight: 195 lb (88 kg)

Career history
- 1956–1957: Calgary Stampeders

John Borger (born c. 1935) is a Canadian former professional football player who played for the Calgary Stampeders, politician and PhD in biochemistry. John Borger played from 1956 to 1957 with the Calgary Stampeders as a Centre. Borger intercepted one pass for 34 yards in his career.

In 1974 Borger contested the leadership of the Alberta Liberal Party, eventually being defeated by Nicholas Taylor.
