= John T. Lowery =

John Thurston (Jack) Lowery (July 6, 1929 – June 4, 2000) was a Calgary-based politician and leader of the Alberta Liberal Party from 1969 to 1971. He was forced to announce his resignation as leader in February 1970, after 10 months in office, shortly after it had been revealed in December 1969 that he had had talks with Premier Harry Strom of the ruling Alberta Social Credit Party about merging or forming an alliance of their two parties with the aim of moderating the conservative governing party, was rejected by the Liberal rank-and-file membership. He was born in Toronto.

Prior to becoming Liberal leader, Lowery worked in the public relations field and had previously been a United Church minister. Lowery died on June 4, 2000, at his home in Victoria, aged 70.
