= John Edward Brownlee as Attorney General of Alberta =

Canadian lawyer and politician

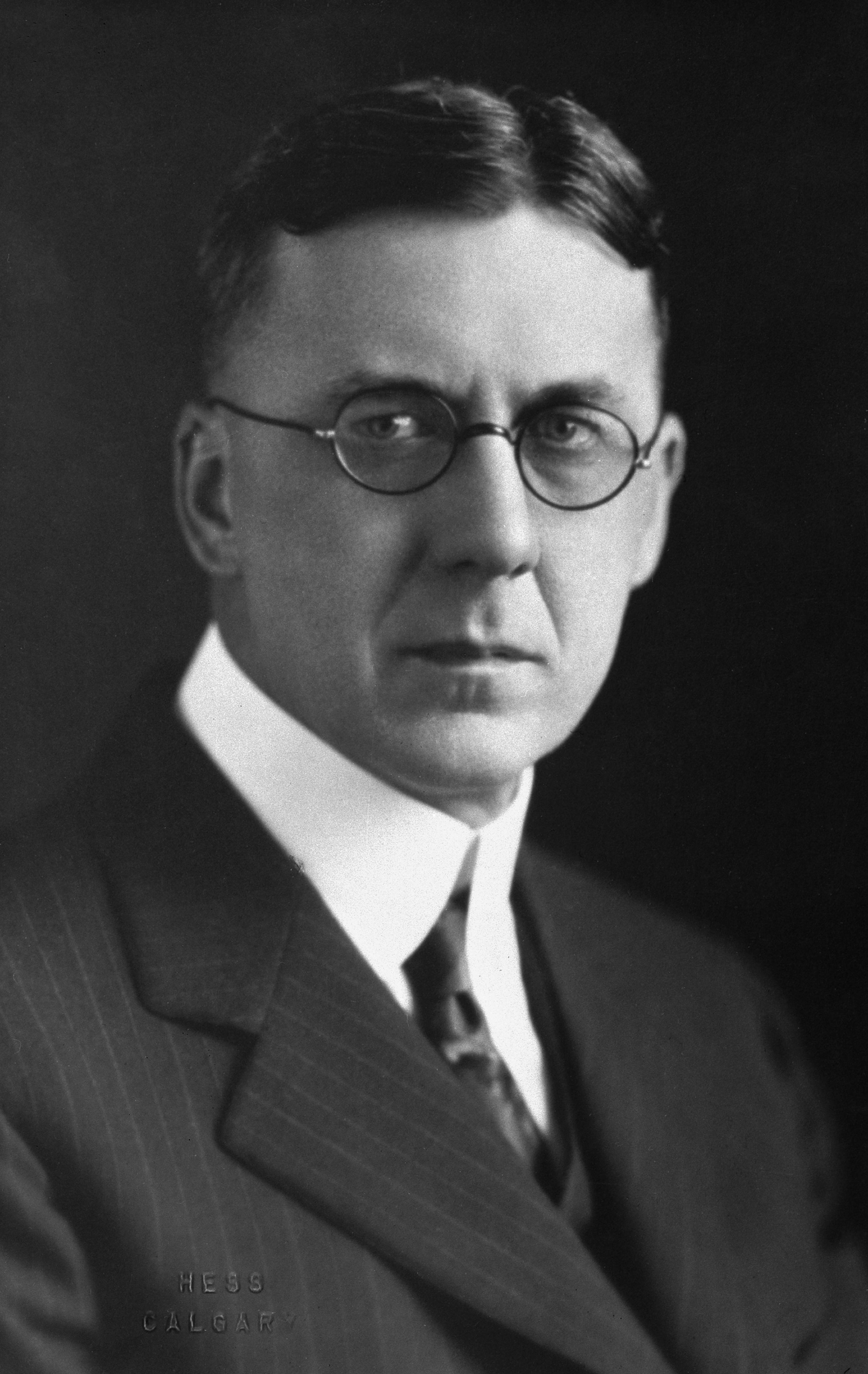
- John Edward Brownlee as Attorney General
- Party: United Farmers
- Seat: Alberta Legislature Building
- First term August 31, 1921 – November 23, 1925
- Premier: Herbert Greenfield
- Cabinet: Greenfield ministry
- Appointed by: Robert Brett
- Second term November 23, 1925 – June 5, 1926
- Premier: Himself
- Cabinet: Brownlee ministry
- Appointed by: William Egbert

John Edward Brownlee served as attorney-general of the province of Alberta in western Canada from 1921 until 1926, in the United Farmers of Alberta (UFA) government of Herbert Greenfield. As Brownlee was the only lawyer in a caucus formed almost entirely of farmers, his role extended beyond the traditional expectations of an attorney-general, and ranged from providing legal advice to explaining how to write a business letter; he also became the government's de facto leader in the Legislative Assembly of Alberta.

UFA members held widely disparate political views, and Brownlee quickly became identified with the government's conservative faction. He opposed radical changes to the structure of government and urged thrift in public spending. As part of the government's attempts to balance its budget, Brownlee favoured selling its money-losing railways and concluding an agreement with the federal government to give Alberta control over its natural resources; he was unsuccessful at both while attorney-general. As a member of a farmers' government, he was also involved in attempts to alleviate drought-induced poverty in southern Alberta and in investigations into the establishment of a provincial wheat pool.

UFA Members of the Legislative Assembly (MLAs) began to see Brownlee as a better leader than the indecisive Greenfield. A group of them attempted to force Greenfield to resign in Brownlee's favour. Though Brownlee opposed these attempts, initially threatening to resign if Greenfield did, he was eventually persuaded to accept the premiership if Greenfield willingly relinquished it. Brownlee became premier November 23, 1925.

== Background ==
Brownlee began his legal career in Calgary, and the UFA was one of his firm's major clients. One of the projects he undertook for it was the creation of the United Grain Growers (UGG), of whose securities division he became general manager in 1919. He also travelled around Alberta with UFA president Henry Wise Wood answering UFA members' legal questions while Wood spoke to them about politics and the farmers' movement. Though Brownlee was not initially interested in the UFA's political activities, this changed through his association with Wood and Progressive Party of Canada leader Thomas Crerar.

Until 1919, the UFA's political activities were limited to advocacy, but that year it decided to run candidates in the 1921 provincial election. Despite Brownlee's burgeoning interest in politics, he did not view himself as part of the UFA's political branch, and did not run as a candidate; indeed, he was on vacation in Victoria, British Columbia, for most of the campaign.

The UFA contested the election without a leader, so when it won 38 of the 61 seats in the Legislative Assembly of Alberta it did not know who it would recommend to form a government as premier of Alberta. Wood was not interested and suggested that Brownlee should take the position, to the latter's astonishment. Brownlee did not believe that, as an urbanite and lawyer, he would be acceptable to the rural UFA caucus, and declined; the position went to Herbert Greenfield.

== Entry into cabinet and legislature ==
Though the UFA MLAs were not willing to accept a non-farmer as premier, many of them realized that the post of attorney-general should go to a lawyer. Others were less convinced, and Brownlee was invited to address the UFA caucus. He acknowledged that there was no constitutional requirement on the question, but advised that a non-lawyer attorney-general would be wholly reliant on the advice of the lawyers on his staff. With the caucus convinced, Greenfield asked Brownlee to accept the position. Brownlee demurred, reluctant to take the resulting cut in income, not eager to leave his family in Calgary to work in Edmonton (the provincial capital), and leery of the high expectations invested in the new government by the province's farmers. Ultimately, a combination of duty, loyalty, and ambition convinced him to accept the position. Though the choice of cabinet ministers is traditionally the prerogative of the premier, as part of the UFA's agenda of democratic reform Greenfield agreed to present his choices to the caucus for vetting. Brownlee was approved August 11, 1921, and was sworn in two days later.

Neither he nor Greenfield had run as a candidate in the election, and neither was a member of the legislature. Percival Baker, the UFA member elected for Ponoka, had died on election day, opening up a seat for one of them. A second seat, Peace River, became available when incumbent Donald MacBeth Kennedy resigned to run in the 1921 federal election. Greenfield seemed a more reasonable candidate for that rugged northern riding than the urban lawyer Brownlee, and so Brownlee was acclaimed as Ponoka's MLA December 9, 1921.

== Advisor to the government ==
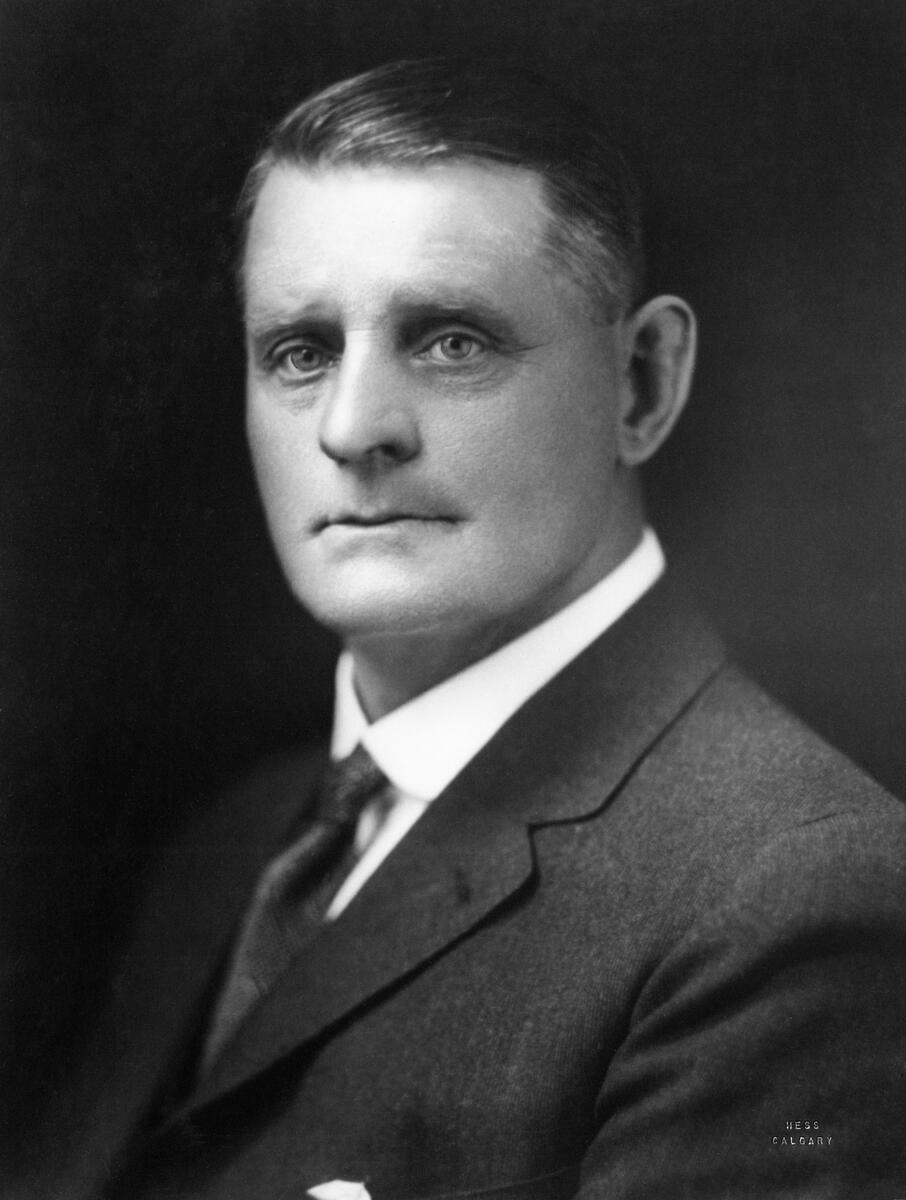
Brownlee's counsel was invaluable to Premier Herbert Greenfield.

Brownlee was the only lawyer in a government composed primarily of farmers, and the rest of the cabinet drew heavily on his expertise. Its reliance on him extended beyond legal issues to such matters as how to write a business letter. Greenfield was among the most dependent, and forwarded most controversial issues to his attorney-general for a draft response; Greenfield often signed the draft and sent it out unchanged. The premier eventually relied on Brownlee so heavily that Brownlee set the agenda for cabinet meetings. The government also relied on Brownlee in the legislature, where it found itself under relentless attack from the John R. Boyle-led Liberals. Brownlee had the widest debating experience of the UFA members, and he was increasingly called upon to counter these attacks. His maiden speech was typical of him: "I came into this House with considerable trepidation, because I knew that sitting opposite would be the former giants of this House, men with ability, experience, and skill. Since coming in I've listened to all these men—giving their best—and now I blush at my own modesty."

When Greenfield was asked a difficult question in the legislature, he often leaned over to Brownlee, his seatmate, who supplied him with an answer in full view of the legislature. Many UFA members found this practice humiliating. Brownlee's importance to the government in the legislature was illustrated by an incident in 1922. Brownlee was on vacation in Victoria during a special sitting of the legislature. While his presence was usually considered crucial, the only item of business scheduled for the session was uncontroversial, and passed by a large margin. However, once this item was dispensed with, some members complained that the Can$100 payment that they were to receive for the special session was too low. Greenfield brought a motion to double it; the amount was increased to $250 in committee. At a time when many farmers earned less than $250 per year, the move cost the UFA dearly in the eyes of its supporters. Many UFA MLAs privately suggested that the incident would have been avoided had Brownlee been present. On another occasion, in 1924, Brownlee was absent from the legislature due to illness. Boyle called him to assure him that he could rest easy, since the Liberals would not raise any difficult issues in his absence. While Brownlee appreciated the gesture, all involved recognized it as an admission that the government was helpless in the legislature without its strongman.

Brownlee's work as an MLA extended beyond the legislature. He gave close attention to correspondence from his constituents, especially those alleging improper treatment at Ponoka's psychiatric hospital. He prepared thoroughly for speaking engagements in his riding, trying to anticipate all possible questions. These measures were reflected in his support in the largely rural riding, where the Calgary lawyer became a popular and well-respected MLA.

== Advocate for conservatism ==
Many of the elected UFA members espoused radical political doctrines calculated to transform the provincial government. Brownlee quickly became identified with the caucus's conservative faction. At the caucus meeting that approved his appointment, he put an end to discussion of whether nominations for justices of the peace should come from UFA locals or its central political committee by asserting that they would continue to be handled by the office of the attorney-general. Later, many UFA MLAs argued that only motions explicitly declaring a lack of confidence in the government should be treated as motions of non-confidence. They were concerned that supporters of the government who nonetheless disagreed with it on a specific issue might be pressured to refrain from voting their consciences on motions, such as money bills, that were conventionally considered tests of the government's confidence. Brownlee warned these MLAs that regardless of their beliefs, the Lieutenant-Governor of Alberta was free to request the government's resignation any time he considered that it lacked or did not merit the legislature's confidence. Despite this warning, UFA MLAs John Russell Love and Alex Moore proposed a resolution in the legislature changing the convention. The proposal attracted notice from across Canada; R. B. Bennett advised Brownlee, his former clerk, to warn Moore and Love that it was unconstitutional and demand that they withdraw it. Brownlee was reluctant to do so, since a similar proposal had been part of the UFA's election platform, and instead moved successful amendments weakening the motion to a vague "statement of intent".

Brownlee clashed again with the UFA's radical elements on the question of a provincial bank. The writings of C. H. Douglas advocating an economic system that he called social credit were attracting notice in Alberta, and his adherents included many UFA members. Led by George Bevington, they sponsored a resolution at the UFA convention in January 1923 calling for the creation of a government-owned bank. After Bevington's introduction, support for the resolution was running high; Brownlee cooled enthusiasm with a speech of his own warning delegates that Alberta's debt load could not manage the programs that Bevington proposed that a provincial bank should undertake. Even so, the convention passed a resolution calling on the provincial government to apply for a bank charter from the federal government, which was responsible for banking under the British North America Act, 1867. At Brownlee's recommendation, the Greenfield government struck a commission under the leadership of University of Alberta economist D. A. MacGibbon, which strongly recommended against the establishment of a provincial bank. This mirrored Brownlee's own conclusion, reached after investigating state-run banks in New Zealand and New South Wales. At the 1924 UFA convention, Bevington and his followers reaffirmed their demands; Brownlee responded by pointing to the findings of the MacGibbon commission and to his contention that the proposal was unconstitutional and would bankrupt the province. In this he was supported by Henry Wise Wood, whom Bevington was challenging for the UFA presidency. Brownlee proposed instead that the government's treasury branches should begin to accept deposits.

Brownlee also advocated a conservative approach on budgetary issues. The UFA government inherited a large budget deficit, and Brownlee was dissatisfied with Greenfield's early efforts at reducing it. In 1922, he warned the premier that unless the government sharply cut expenditures, he would find it difficult to defend its fiscal policy in that year's session of the legislature. In 1924, unsatisfied with Greenfield's response, he made an example of his own department, cutting staff and taking a strict approach to spending. In 1923, he found an ally for his position in new provincial treasurer Richard Gavin Reid, who impressed on his cabinet colleagues the need for thrift and recommended the creation of a purchasing department for coordinating government expenditures.

== Railways and natural resources ==
The province's poor financial situation was due in part to its $5 million annual expenditure on railways, comprising 37 percent of the 1922 budget. These expenditures resulted from the collapse of four small-railroad syndicates, which left the government to finance the rail construction. Brownlee believed that these lines, the largest of which was the Edmonton, Dunvegan and British Columbia (ED&BC) line, should be sold to either the Canadian National Railway or the Canadian Pacific Railway. Though neither was interested in purchasing the lines, in 1925 both expressed an interest in leasing the ED&BC. However, the Royal Bank of Canada, which held the mortgage on the ED&BC, refused to consent to any lease arrangement unless the Alberta government redeemed its stock in the railway as security for the mortgage. Brownlee was inclined to agree with Minister of Railways Vernor Smith that the government should buy the mortgage from the Royal Bank and become the owner and operator of the line, but Greenfield was resistant to this approach and resolution of the railways question had to wait until Brownlee was premier.

Brownlee was also active on natural resource issues. Alberta, along with Saskatchewan and Manitoba, had been admitted into Confederation without being granted the control over its natural resources that the older provinces enjoyed over theirs. While the federal government did provide a compensatory grant in lieu of resource rights, Alberta sought control over the resources not only because it believed that this would yield higher revenues than the grant, but out of sheer pride. In 1920, Prime Minister Arthur Meighen committed the federal government in principle to transferring resource rights; all that remained to discuss were the terms. Alberta, while willing to forgo the annual subsidy, wanted compensation for some of the land and resources previously awarded by the federal government to private interests, including 6,400,000 acres (2,600,000 ha) of land granted to eastern railway companies, mineral leases that deprived the government of royalties for more than half of the 6,000,000 short tons (5,400,000 t) of coal extracted from Alberta annually, and assorted areas with hydroelectric potential that had been yielded to private companies.

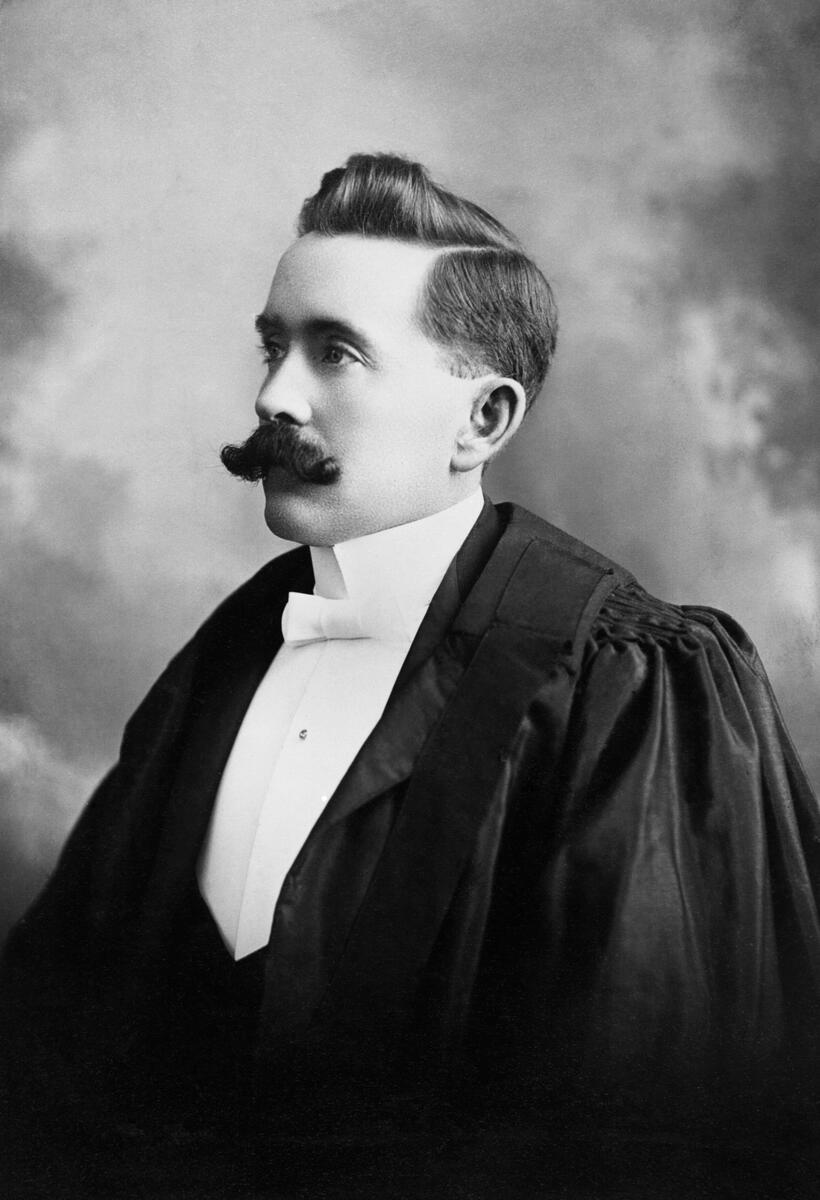
Liberal leader John R. Boyle urged the federal government to reject the natural resource concessions that Brownlee sought.

Brownlee became the province's chief negotiator on resource questions in October 1921. Though early attempts at reaching agreement were hampered by the unwillingness of the Maritime provinces to agree to the necessary constitutional amendments unless their own annual subsidies were increased, negotiations between the provincial and federal government continued intermittently throughout the 1920s. Liberal Prime Minister William Lyon Mackenzie King occasionally appeared receptive to Alberta's demands, but never fully agreed to them. A possible explanation for this is found in a 1924 letter from Alberta Liberal Party leader John R. Boyle to King, explaining that the UFA was likely to lose the next provincial election to Boyle's Liberals "unless something extraordinary happens. That extraordinary thing which Greenfield wants to happen now is obtaining from you the natural resources at once." Despite this letter, the sides seemed close to agreement in early 1925: at a January conference Alberta accepted in principle a federal offer of three years of continuing subsidy after the transfer of resource rights. After an exhaustive series of meetings between Brownlee and the federal counsel, the agreement went back to the governments for approval. As Greenfield and Brownlee expressed their impatience with federal inaction, an intergovernmental meeting was convened in May. The meeting proceeded at a leisurely pace into June, after which King announced that his cabinet would like the summer to consider the agreement in greater detail. The Albertans returned home in disgust.

The consequences of continued control of Alberta's resources by the federal government extended beyond the merely financial. As Alberta's smaller towns and rural areas were being connected to the electrical grid, Calgary Power made an application to the federal government for hydroelectric rights on the upper Bow River. Not wanting these rights to fall into private hands, Brownlee made an application of his own on behalf of the Alberta government. It was denied by Charles Stewart, federal minister of the interior and the premier of Alberta whom the UFA had defeated in 1921.

In 1924, the UFA government passed the Mineral Tax Act, which taxed mineral rightsholders at a rate of three cents per acre. The two largest such rightsholders, the Canadian Pacific Railway and the Hudson's Bay Company, urged the federal government to use its power of disallowance to put a stop to the legislation. When the federal government complied, Brownlee protested its action on three grounds: first, as a direct tax the proposed levy was within Alberta's rights under section 92 of the British North America Act, 1867, and it was constitutional convention for the federal government to exercise disallowance only when the impugned legislation was clearly unconstitutional. Second, disallowance allowed the province no recourse to the courts, where the constitutionality of the legislation could be tested. Third, the federal government's stated reasons for disallowing the legislation, which were released belatedly by justice minister Ernest Lapointe, were (according to Brownlee) erroneous and led Brownlee to suggest that Lapointe, a Québécois lawyer trained in the civil law tradition of his home province rather than the common law system used in the rest of Canada, must be unfamiliar with the land-holding system outside of Quebec. Brownlee's attacks were rejected, and the disallowance stood.

== Agricultural policy ==
The UFA took office at a time of drought in the southern regions of the province. At Brownlee's instigation, the government appointed a three-person panel, led by Charles Alexander Magrath, to investigate the problem. In 1922 the government passed the Drought Relief Act. The Act, a Brownlee brainchild, created a Drought Relief Commissioner to whom farmers in affected areas could turn for financial counselling and asset administration. It authorized the adjustment of farmers' debts to levels that were within the debtors' means, but still sufficiently acceptable to creditors that their willingness to make loans would not disappear altogether. Brownlee hoped that this system would provide affected farmers with sound financial advice and facilitate the fair division of farmers' assets among competing creditors without forcing farmers to pay high legal fees. In 1923 this was replaced by the Debt Adjustment Act, which strengthened the commissioner's powers and was intended to extend his jurisdiction over the entire province; due to opposition from lenders, the portions of the act dealing with other than drought-stricken areas were never proclaimed.

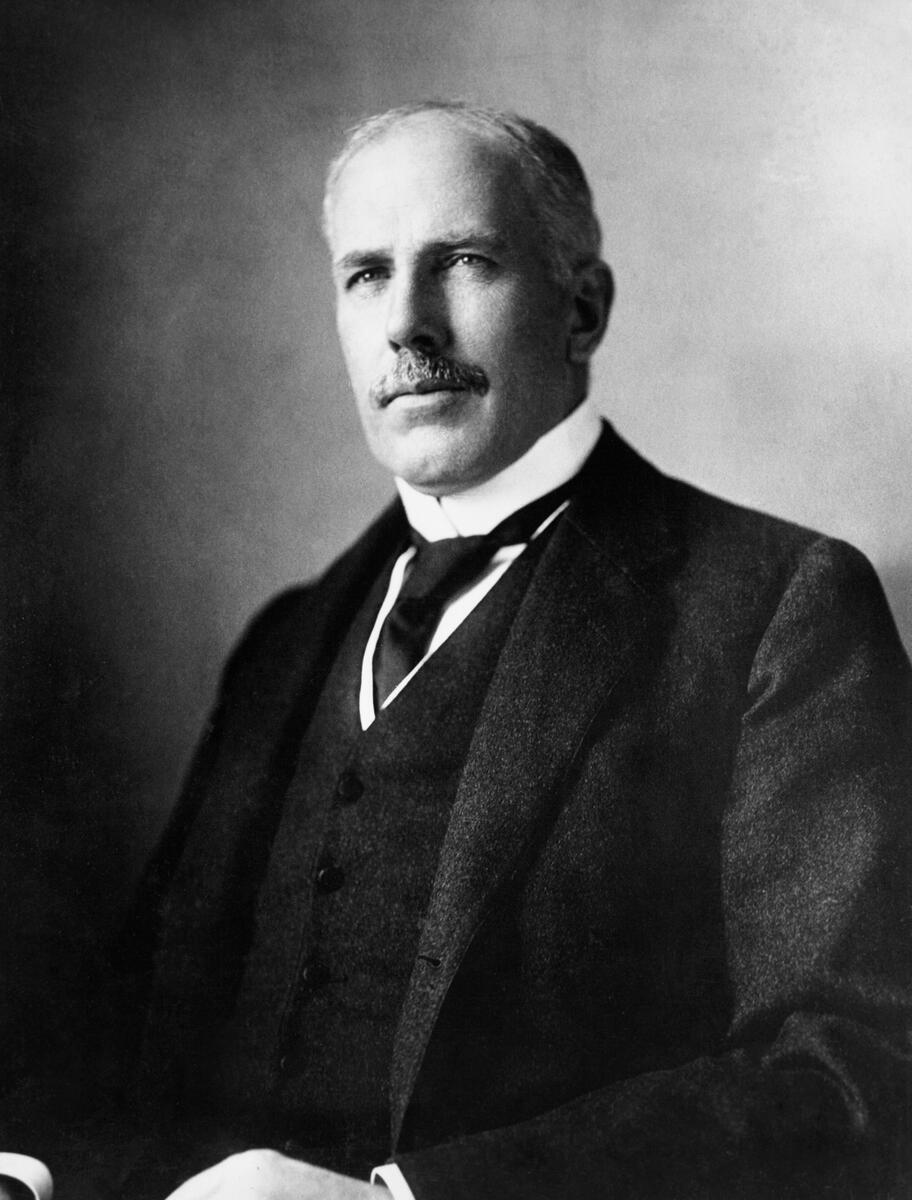
Charles Alexander Magrath headed a panel tasked with examining the problem of southern drought.

The name change of the legislation reflected Brownlee's growing belief that farmers' financial troubles were due to factors more systemic than lack of rain. Angry over the federal government's decision to allow the first incarnation of the Canadian Wheat Board (CWB) to lapse, many Albertan farmers began to advocate the "pooling" of their wheat, which would render individual farmers less susceptible to the machinations of grain speculators by introducing collective marketing, with each farmer receiving an averaged, identical price. Farmers in Saskatchewan and Manitoba were more adamant about the return of the CWB; Prime Minister King eventually agreed to its re-creation, provided that at least two of Alberta, Saskatchewan, and Manitoba passed enabling legislation and found the personnel necessary to sit on the board. By June 1923, the provinces had not found anybody suitable. Interest in pooling experienced a resurgence. In July, a UFA meeting, which Brownlee attended as the government's representative, endorsed the creation of a wheat pool as soon as practicable. Brownlee and his cabinet colleague Richard Gavin Reid undertook an investigation of how soon this might be, which included a trip to San Francisco to meet with Aaron Sapiro, an American agricultural cooperative leader. Sapiro proclaimed that a wheat pool could be organized in a few weeks, though both Brownlee and Reid disagreed and returned to Canada committed to caution. However, in their absence the Edmonton Journal and Calgary Herald had invited Sapiro to tour Alberta, and his speeches stirred up extravagant expectations among UFA members for immediate action, in time for the new organization to market the 1923 crop.

Faced with the zeal of its membership, the UFA leadership appointed a 17-person committee, including Brownlee, to create the Alberta Cooperative Wheat Producers Limited. The membership fee was to be three dollars, and the organization was to work with similar organizations in Saskatchewan and Manitoba. The provincial government—at Brownlee's insistence—and the UGG both provided startup loans. The UGG also took the lead in agreeing to let its grain elevators be used by the pool, which allowed Brownlee to defeat those committee members who thought the new company should acquire its own elevators.

By the end of August it was obvious that the organizations in Saskatchewan and Manitoba were not going to be ready in time for the 1923 crop, and the committee decided to proceed alone. It determined that if farmers representing half of Alberta's total wheat acreage agreed to pool their crop by September 15, the pool would proceed. Brownlee believed that this was an impossible objective. Despite the experimental and unproven nature of the model and the as-yet nonexistent organization that was to execute it, this objective was met. The Alberta Wheat Pool was born. By the following year's harvest, comparable organizations had formed in Saskatchewan and Manitoba, and a Central Selling Agency (CSA) was formed to sell all three provinces' wheat. The CSA's first president, Alexander James McPhail (whom Brownlee helped select), offered Brownlee the position of CSA general manager, at the attractive salary of $20,000 per year (a figure that Brownlee had helped set). At the urging of his government colleagues and the UFA leadership, both of whom felt his continued presence in Edmonton was vital to the UFA government's hold on power, he declined; he was instead made the CSA's general counsel. Brownlee was also heavily involved in the creation of a livestock pool and three dairy pools, as a sort of "poolmania" hit Alberta farmers.

== Prohibition and Sunday shopping ==
As attorney-general, Brownlee inherited the prohibition implemented by the previous Liberal government. While the UFA base and public opinion both favoured prohibition, the existing law was full of loopholes and unevenly enforced. Some judges, opponents of prohibition, refused to convict defendants charged with liquor offences. The UFA had pledged during the election campaign to introduce prohibition in fact as well as in law, and the task fell to Brownlee. He initially cooled expectations by announcing that he had no interest in making "any hasty or ill-considered move", either in changing the law or altering enforcement of the existing one.

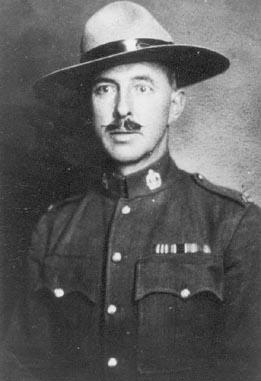
The September 1922 murder of the Alberta Provincial Police's Steve Lawson marked a turning point in Alberta's prohibition policy. As attorney-general, Brownlee aggressively prosecuted Emilio Picariello and Florence Lassandro for the murder. Both were hanged.

On September 21, 1922, Constable Steve Lawson of the Alberta Provincial Police was murdered at his Blairmore home by bootlegger Emil Picariello and his companion Florence Lassandra. He was the third policeman killed in Alberta in liquor-related incidents in 1922. The murder opened up a rift between Albertans of British descent, who saw bootlegging as an affront to the rule of law even if they did not support prohibition, and Albertans of southern and eastern European descent, who found prohibition to be something of a joke and accepted bootlegging. Brownlee authorized the deployment of special constables to apprehend Picariello and Lassandra. Once they were arrested, he appeared personally at the prosecution's bench alongside A. A. McGillivray, reputedly Alberta's best courtroom lawyer, whose services he secured specifically for the case. Picariello and Lassandra were convicted and sentenced to death by hanging.

By the time of their executions in May 1923, public opinion was turning against prohibition. The sentiment that criminal activities such as Picariello's were the inevitable result of prohibition laws became a popular one, as did the view that the government should legalize and regulate liquor sales. Brownlee, morally supportive of prohibition, began to personally support this course, believing that prohibition was unenforceable in the face of widespread public opposition. A 1923 plebiscite opted for the end of prohibition. In 1924 Brownlee guided the Government Liquor Control Act—drafted with the assistance of R. B. Bennett, who received $1,000 for his services—through the legislature.

As attorney-general, Brownlee was responsible for administration of the Lord's Day Act, which forbade most commerce on Sundays. Charles Huestis of the Lord's Day Alliance took issue with the Edmonton Orchestra's Sunday concerts, on the grounds that by opening them only to its subscription holders it was de facto charging admission, and that by paying its musicians honoraria it was gainfully employing them in their regular professions on Sundays. Brownlee declined to prosecute, since courts had previously held that the concerts were legal. Huestis retorted that as attorney-general Brownlee should make them illegal, to which Brownlee responded that he fully appreciated the importance of the Sabbath and did not need to be lectured on the subject by Huestis. There were also complaints about farmers violating the act by working Sundays; Brownlee felt that such complaints were often more about conflicts between neighbours than preservation of the Sabbath, and prosecuted only the most gratuitous and flagrant cases.

== Political machinations and succession ==
In the 1921 federal election, 65 of the House of Commons of Canada's 235 seats were won by Progressives and allied factions, including the UFA, which won both seats it contested. Liberal Prime Minister-designate William Lyon MacKenzie King had only a minority, and expected to rely on the support of these Progressives to govern. Progressive leader Thomas Crerar envisioned forming a coalition government with the Liberals, and knew that he would be expected to provide cabinet members from Alberta, which had been swept by Progressives and allied parties. Seeing no "cabinet material" among the elected members, he sent an emissary to Edmonton to convince Greenfield or Brownlee to enter federal politics. Brownlee refused and advised Greenfield to do the same, on the grounds that their abandonment of provincial politics soon after the UFA's election would be seen as a betrayal.

As Greenfield's shortcomings became obvious, Brownlee found himself fielding propositions closer to home: in 1924 a group of UFA MLAs dissatisfied with Greenfield—including George Johnston, George MacLachlan, William Shield, Donald Cameron, Oran McPherson, and Austin Claypool—approached Brownlee to advise him that they planned to ask the premier to resign in favour of his attorney-general. To their surprise, Brownlee immediately told them that if Greenfield resigned, so would he. Faced with Brownlee's refusal to cooperate with their coup, the dissidents relented. They made another attempt in 1925; Brownlee again threatened to resign, but this time was persuaded by Henry Wise Wood to accept the crown if Greenfield relinquished it willingly. Greenfield assured Brownlee that he had not wanted the job of premier in the first place and would happily see Brownlee take it from him. Faced with these assurances, Brownlee agreed to form a government, and became premier of Alberta on November 23, 1925. He remained attorney-general until after the 1926 election, when he appointed the newly elected John Lymburn to replace him.
