= John Sissons =

Canadian politician

Member of Parliament for Peace River
- In office 1940–1945
- Preceded by: René-Antoine Pelletier
- Succeeded by: Solon Earl Low

Personal details
- Born: John Howard Sissons; July 14, 1892 Orillia, Ontario, Canada
- Died: November 11, 1969 (aged 77) Edmonton, Alberta, Canada
- Party: Liberal Party of Canada
- Spouse(s): Frances Hewitt Johnson (m. 1929)
- Profession: barrister, author, judge

John "Jack" Howard Sissons (July 14, 1892 – November 11, 1969) was a Canadian barrister, author, judge and federal politician.

== Early life ==
Sissons was born in Orillia, Ontario and, at the age of four, contracted polio, which injured his leg and he walked with a limp for the rest of his life. His father worked at the Orillia Mental Asylum and Sissons was also employed there during the summer. Having left Orillia to teach in both Ontario and Alberta Sissons then moved to Kingston to attend Queen's University. In 1917 he returned to Alberta and passed the bar examination at Edmonton in 1920. He then moved to Grande Prairie to practice law.

== Federal politics ==
Sissons was elected to the House of Commons of Canada for the Peace River electoral district in the 1940 Canadian federal election. Representing the Liberal Party he defeated incumbent René-Antoine Pelletier to win a term in office. Sissons was defeated in the 1945 Canadian federal election by Social Credit leader Solon Earl Low.

== Judge ==
After losing the 1945 election he was made a judge of the Alberta District Court and became the chief judge in 1950.

Sissons was appointed as the first judge to the Supreme Court of the Northwest Territories (then called the Territorial Court of the Northwest Territories) in 1955. He became the first judge to serve on the Supreme court since 1905. He made many landmark decisions, and was very fair in his rulings. One intriguing move he made was to hire an Inuk carver to make soapstone carvings of prominent murder cases he presided over throughout the Far North; he was inspired to do this when he ruled in the favour of traditional justice in the case of a young boy, and the boy presented him with a soapstone carving after the trial. These carvings are on display in the present day Yellowknife Court House, and the collection continued to be added to by Justice William Morrow when he took Justice Sissons' place.

=== Notable Inuit cases ===
- Kikkik
- Stephen Angulalik

== Heritage ==
Sissons Lake, Sissons Court (the street, not the hall of justice), and the Ecole J.H. Sissons School in Yellowknife are named after him.
