= Grande Prairie (federal electoral district) =

Federal electoral district in Alberta, Canada

Alberta electoral district
- Interactive map of riding boundaries from the 2025 federal election. Point indicates the city of Grande Prairie.

Federal electoral district
- Legislature: House of Commons
MP
Chris Warkentin
Conservative
- District created: 2013
- First contested: 2015
- Last contested: 2025
- District webpage: profile, map

Demographics
- Population (2021): 119,586
- Electors (2019): 84,688
- Area (km²): 111,864.57
- Pop. density (per km²): 1.1
- Census division(s): Division No. 17, Division No. 18, Division No. 19
- Census subdivision(s): Grande Prairie, Grande Prairie County, Greenview (part), Northern Lights, Clear Hills, Sexsmith, Saddle Hills, Beaverlodge, Wembley, Sturgeon Lake

Grande Prairie is a federal electoral district in northwestern Alberta, created in 2012 as Grande Prairie—Mackenzie from the Peace River district. It contains the western half of Alberta's Peace region, including the city of Grande Prairie (where more than half its residents live). It is impossible to traverse the district by road without leaving it, as the section of the Peace River contained within has no bridges or ferries.

Following the 2022 Canadian federal electoral redistribution, this riding was renamed at the 2025 Canadian federal election. It lost the remainder of Mackenzie County including the communities of Rainbow Lake, Hay Lake 209, Upper Hay River 212, High Level and Bushe River 207 to Peace River—Westlock.

== Demographics ==
Panethnic groups in Grande Prairie—Mackenzie (2011−2021)
Panethnic group	2021		2016		2011	
Panethnic group	Pop.	%	Pop.	%	Pop.	%
European (Note: Statistic includes all persons that did not make up part of a visible minority or an indigenous identity.)	88,365	75.42%	91,325	79.08%	87,215	82.63%
Indigenous	16,825	14.36%	15,165	13.13%	13,725	13%
Southeast Asian (Note: Statistic includes total responses of "Filipino" and "Southeast Asian" under visible minority section on census.)	5,480	4.68%	4,005	3.47%	1,885	1.79%
South Asian	2,020	1.72%	1,335	1.16%	685	0.65%
African	1,885	1.61%	1,525	1.32%	530	0.5%
East Asian (Note: Statistic includes total responses of "Chinese", "Korean", and "Japanese" under visible minority section on census.)	965	0.82%	945	0.82%	785	0.74%
Latin American	630	0.54%	485	0.42%	300	0.28%
Middle Eastern (Note: Statistic includes total responses of "West Asian" and "Arab" under visible minority section on census.)	515	0.44%	405	0.35%	190	0.18%
Other/multiracial (Note: Statistic includes total responses of "Visible minority, n.i.e." and "Multiple visible minorities" under visible minority section on census.)	480	0.41%	285	0.25%	230	0.22%
Total responses	117,160	97.97%	115,480	98.43%	105,545	98.88%
Total population	119,586	100%	117,327	100%	106,738	100%
Notes: Totals greater than 100% due to multiple origin responses. Demographics based on 2012 Canadian federal electoral redistribution riding boundaries.

== Members of Parliament ==
This riding has elected the following members of the House of Commons of Canada:

Parliament	Years	Member	Party
Grande Prairie—Mackenzie; Riding created from Peace River
42nd	2015–2019	Chris Warkentin	Conservative
43rd	2019–2021	Chris Warkentin	Conservative
44th	2021–2025	Chris Warkentin	Conservative
Grande Prairie
45th	2025–present	Chris Warkentin	Conservative

== Election results ==
View source data.
Graph of election results in Grande Prairie—Mackenzie (minor parties that never got 2% of the vote or didn't run consistently are omitted)

=== Grande Prairie, 2023 representation order ===
2025 Canadian federal election
Party	Candidate	Votes	%	±%	Expenditures
Conservative	Chris Warkentin	47,904	81.68	+12.72	$41,502.41
Liberal	Maureen Mcleod	6,946	11.84	+7.62	$3,346.19
New Democratic	Jennifer Villebrun	2,460	4.19	–7.66	$2,452.72
People's	Shawn McLean	828	1.41	–8.79	$6,195.77
Rhinoceros	Donovan Eckstrom	291	0.50	–0.10	none listed
Independent	Elliot McDavid	223	0.38	–	none listed
Total valid votes/expense limit		58,652	99.41	–	$160,454.51
Total rejected ballots		348	0.59	+0.00	
Turnout		59,000	69.44	+6.06	
Eligible voters		84,961			
Conservative hold		Swing			
Source: Elections Canada

2021 federal election redistributed results
Party	Vote	%
Conservative	35,401	68.96
New Democratic	6,085	11.85
People's	5,238	10.20
Liberal	2,164	4.22
Others	2,447	4.77

=== Grande Prairie—Mackenzie, 2013 representation order ===
2021 Canadian federal election: Grande Prairie—Mackenzie
Party	Candidate	Votes	%	±%	Expenditures
Conservative	Chris Warkentin	36,361	68.43	–15.54	$43,536.04
New Democratic	Jennifer Villebrun	6,462	12.16	+5.20	$841.79
People's	Shawn McLean	5,411	10.18	+7.74	$15,893.10
Liberal	Dan Campbell	2,397	4.51	–0.26	$2,223.58
Maverick	Ambrose Ralph	2,195	4.13	–	$24,544.01
Rhinoceros	Donovan Eckstrom	314	0.59	–	none listed
Total valid votes/expense limit		53,140	99.41	–	$140,613.53
Total rejected ballots		315	0.59	+0.08	
Turnout		53,455	63.38	–7.29	
Eligible voters		84,343			
Conservative hold		Swing		–10.37	
Source: Elections Canada

2019 Canadian federal election: Grande Prairie—Mackenzie
Party	Candidate	Votes	%	±%	Expenditures
Conservative	Chris Warkentin	51,198	83.96	+11.05	$39,732.27
New Democratic	Erin Alyward	4,245	6.96	–1.18	$1,284.64
Liberal	Kenneth Munro	2,910	4.77	–9.89	$1,675.64
People's	Douglas Gordon Burchill	1,492	2.45	–	$4,216.22
Green	Shelley Termuende	1,134	1.86	–1.28	none listed
Total valid votes/expense limit		60,979	99.49	–	$138,396.48
Total rejected ballots		314	0.51	+0.21	
Turnout		61,293	70.67	+5.95	
Eligible voters		86,736			
Conservative hold		Swing		+6.12	
Source: Elections Canada

2015 Canadian federal election: Grande Prairie—Mackenzie
Party	Candidate	Votes	%	±%	Expenditures
Conservative	Chris Warkentin	38,895	72.92	–3.21	$47,450.74
Liberal	Reagan Johnston	7,819	14.66	+11.48	$7,280.10
New Democratic	Saba Mossagizi	4,343	8.14	–7.26	$13,165.14
Green	James David Friesen	1,673	3.14	–0.62	$2,768.22
Libertarian	Dylan Thompson	613	1.15	–	$120.00
Total valid votes/expense limit		53,343	99.70	–	$269,305.37
Total rejected ballots		158	0.30	–	
Turnout		53,501	64.72	–	
Eligible voters		82,665			
Conservative hold		Swing		–7.34	
Source: Elections Canada

2011 federal election redistributed results
Party	Vote	%
Conservative	25,917	76.13
New Democratic	5,245	15.41
Green	1,271	3.73
Liberal	1,084	3.18

== See also ==
- List of Canadian electoral districts
- Historical federal electoral districts of Canada
