= Peace Air =

- Old Peace Air logo
IATA	ICAO	Call sign
-	-	-
- Commenced operations: 1962
- Ceased operations: May 18, 2007
- Fleet size: See Fleet below
- Destinations: See Destinations below
- Headquarters: Peace River, Alberta, Canada
- Key people: Budd Dennis, John MacMillan, Les Gayton, Albert Cooper

Peace Air was a Canadian regional airline that flew to destinations within the Canadian province of Alberta and to two destinations in eastern British Columbia. It covered niche markets including scheduled flights to smaller communities, freight and charter flights in northern Alberta. It was based in the town of Peace River, Alberta. On May 18, 2007 Peace Air announced that the airline would cease all operations, and was placed into bankruptcy.

== History ==
Peace Air was started in 1962 in the town of Peace River. From 1994 onwards, it was owned by Wendy and Albert Cooper.

The company was established in 1962 as Peace River Air Services by an optometrist (Mr. Smale) and a jeweller (Budd Dennis). At that time all the charter flights operated after 1700 hours, when the optometrist and jeweller closed their businesses for the work day. John MacMillan took over Mr. Smale's share of Peace Air after he was killed in an automobile accident involving a gravel truck. In 1991 Les Gayton, aircraft mechanic, became the primary owner of Peace Air until his death from a heart attack in June 1991. Mr. Gayton's widow, Winnie Gayton, ran the company until she sold all rights to Mr. and Mrs. Albert Cooper.

Peace Air's head office operated at the Peace River Airport, 7 kilometers outside Peace River town limits, and also 7 kilometers outside of Grimshaw, Alberta. Approximately 98 employees (including pilots, counter agents, secretaries etc.) were responsible for managing all of Peace Air's route locations. At one point, commuter air carrier Alberta Citylink operated flights for Peace Air with BAe Jetstream turboprops.

The airline was shut down in 2007, and its assets were seized to try to pay back creditors, including several small businesses, who were owed a total of $3.5 million. For people who had purchased tickets to the now defunct airline, owner Albert Cooper said they should contact their credit card company.

== Destinations ==
Destinations served by Peace Air:

- Alberta
  - Calgary (Calgary International Airport)
  - Cold Lake
  - Edmonton
    - (Edmonton City Centre (Blatchford Field) Airport - Esso Avitat)
    - (Edmonton International Airport)
  - Fort McMurray (Fort McMurray Airport)
  - Grande Prairie
  - High Level
  - Lloydminster
  - Medicine Hat
  - Peace River
  - Red Deer
- British Columbia
  - Fort Nelson
  - Fort St. John

== Fleet ==
As of August 2006 the Peace Air fleet included:

- Two (2) BAe Jetstream 31
- Two (2) BAe Jetstream 32

Other aircraft operated by Peace Air during its existence included:

- Beechcraft 100 King Air
- Pilatus PC-12
- Piper Chieftain
- Cessna 210

== See also ==
- List of defunct airlines of Canada
