= Herbert Greenfield =

Canadian politician (1869–1949)

The Honourable Herbert Greenfield
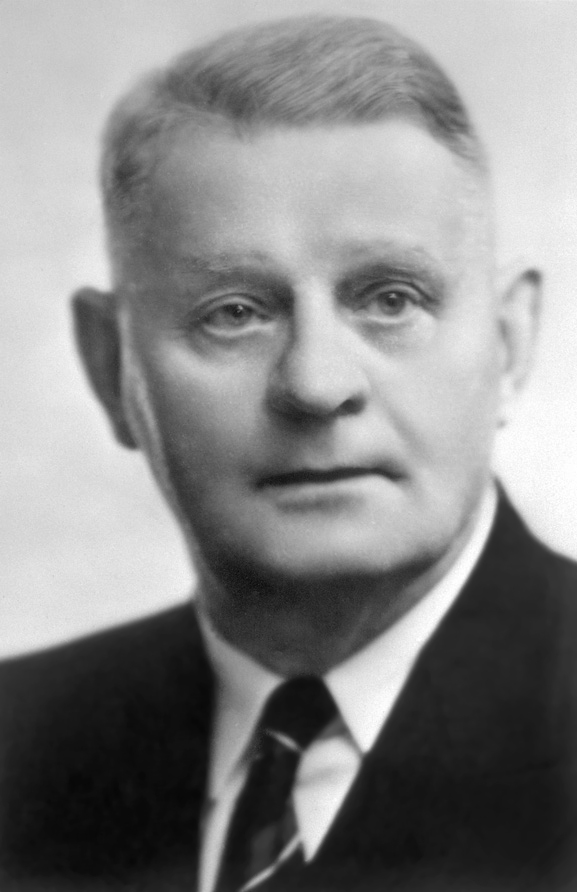
- c. 1920s

4th Premier of Alberta
- In office August 13, 1921 – November 23, 1925
- Monarch: George V
- Lieutenant Governor: Robert Brett (1921–1925); William Egbert (1925)
- Preceded by: Charles Stewart
- Succeeded by: John Edward Brownlee

Member of the Legislative Assembly of Alberta
- In office December 9, 1921 – June 28, 1926
- Preceded by: Donald Kennedy
- Succeeded by: Hugh Allen
- Constituency: Peace River

Alberta Minister of Municipal Affairs
- In office 1923 – November 23, 1925
- Preceded by: Richard Gavin Reid
- Succeeded by: Richard Gavin Reid

Alberta Provincial Secretary
- In office August 13, 1921 – 1923
- Preceded by: Jean Côté
- Succeeded by: John Edward Brownlee

Alberta Provincial Treasurer
- In office August 13, 1921 – 1923
- Preceded by: Charles R. Mitchell
- Succeeded by: Richard Gavin Reid

Personal details
- Born: November 25, 1869 Winchester, Hampshire, England
- Died: August 23, 1949 (aged 79) Calgary, Alberta, Canada
- Resting place: Union Cemetery, Calgary
- Party: United Farmers of Alberta
- Spouses: Elizabeth Harris (m. 1900–1922) Marjorie Cormack (m. 1926)
- Children: 2
- Occupation: Politician; farmer

Herbert W. Greenfield (November 25, 1869 – August 23, 1949) was a Canadian politician and farmer who served as the fourth premier of Alberta from 1921 until 1925. Born in Winchester, Hampshire, in England, he immigrated to Canada in his late twenties, settling first in Ontario and then in Alberta, where he farmed. He soon became involved in the United Farmers of Alberta (UFA), a farmers' lobby organization that was in the process of becoming a political party, and was elected as the organization's vice president. Greenfield did not run in the 1921 provincial election, the first provincial general election in which the UFA fielded candidates, but when the UFA won a majority in the Legislature in that election he was chosen by the UFA caucus to serve as Premier. Like most of the UFA caucus, Greenfield had no experience in government and he struggled in the position.

He relied extensively on his Attorney General, John E. Brownlee, for counsel on policy and strategy. He was unable to control his caucus, which did not generally believe in party discipline, and his government almost lost several votes in the Legislature despite its majority. He was unable to effectively address the problems facing farmers (including drought and low grain prices), bitter labour disputes in the coal industry, or the pronounced divisions in public opinion that had sprung up around prohibition (which his government ended). Despite this, his time as Premier saw the elimination of the provincial deficit, substantial progress in negotiating the transfer of natural resource rights from the federal government, and the creation of the Alberta Wheat Pool. He also named Irene Parlby as the province's first female cabinet minister.

By 1924, many UFA Members of the Legislative Assembly (MLAs) wanted to see Greenfield leave office, both because they were frustrated with his failings and because they thought it likely that a Greenfield-led government would be defeated in the next election. Their first attempt to replace him failed when Brownlee, their intended replacement, refused to have anything to do with the plan, but a second attempt, in 1925, was successful when Brownlee agreed to take office if Greenfield personally requested that he do so. Greenfield had not wanted the job in the first place, and agreed to resign in Brownlee's favour. After his retirement from politics, Greenfield represented Alberta in London, England, for several years before returning to Canada to work in the oil and gas industry. He died in 1949 at the age of 79.

== Early life and family ==
Herbert W. Greenfield was born November 25, 1869, in Winchester, Hampshire, England, the son of John Greenfield and Mary Leake. He attended Wesleyan School in Dalston, but dropped out as a result of his father's bankruptcy. He worked aboard a cattle boat in 1892 before emigrating to Canada in 1896. In Canada, he worked in the oil fields near Sarnia, Ontario, and as a farmer in Weston, Ontario. He married Elizabeth Harris on February 28, 1900. The couple had two sons, Franklin Harris Greenfield and Arnold Leake Greenfield. In 1904, the family went west for economic reasons and homesteaded near Edmonton. He found work in a lumber mill and later turned to farming. During his first year in Alberta, a fire destroyed his home, and he and his wife spent the winter in an abandoned sod hut. In 1906, they resettled to a large home four kilometers south of Westlock. In January 1922, while Greenfield was Premier, Elizabeth died suddenly as a result of routine surgery. He remarried in 1926, to Marjorie Greenwood Cormack, who brought two children of her own into the marriage.

== Early political career ==
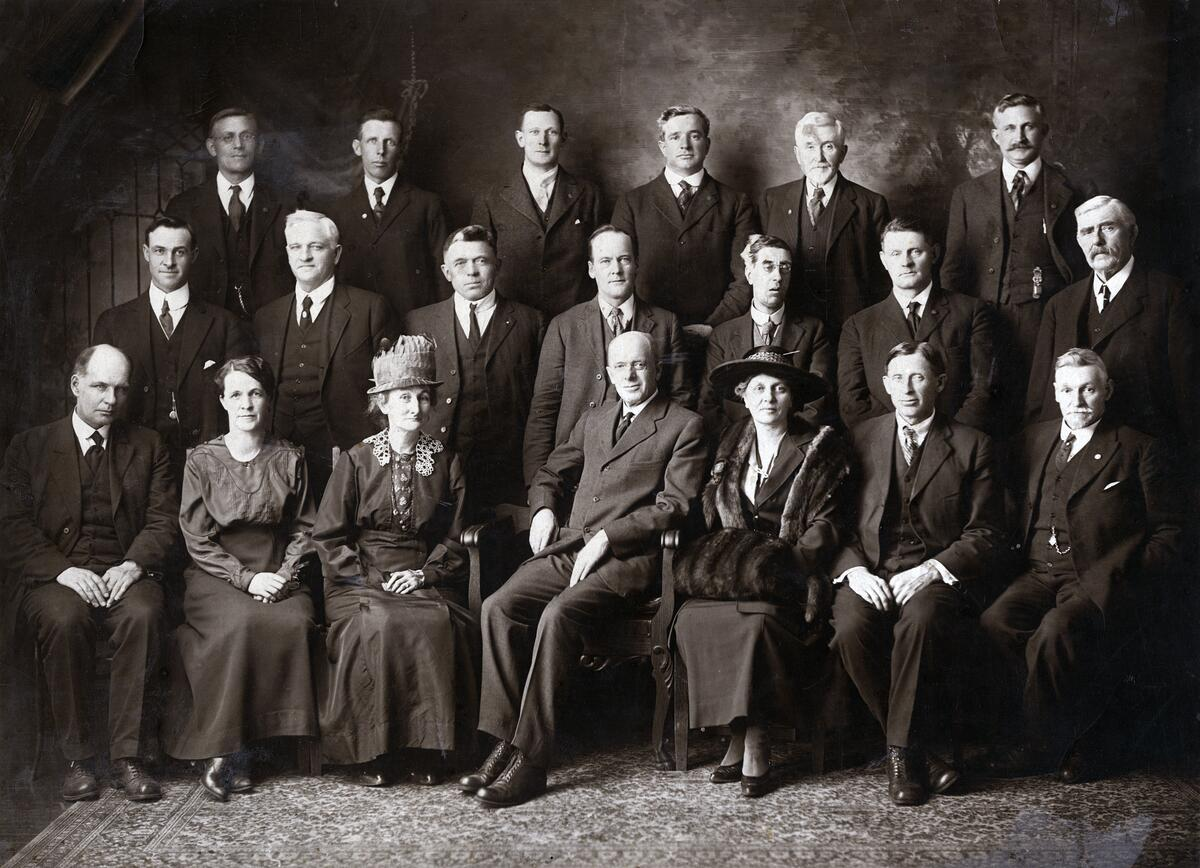
The United Farmers of Alberta Board of Directors in 1919, Greenfield is second from the right in the middle row

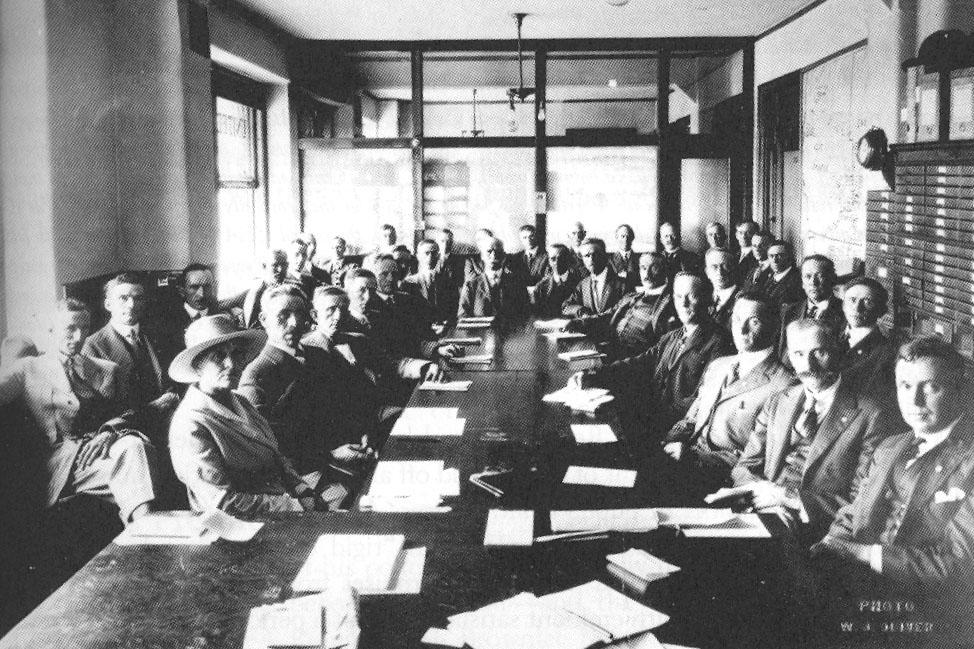
The caucus meeting that selected Greenfield as Premier, summer 1921

Greenfield entered public life on a local level soon after moving to his new farm. He was elected to the local school board, where he spent twelve years, including stints as chair, secretary, and treasurer. Additionally, he served as Vice President of the Alberta Educational Association, as President of the Westlock Agricultural Society, and as co-founder and President of the Alberta Association of Municipal Districts. Greenfield also was an officer of the province-wide Association of Local Improvement Districts, which advocated for reforms such as a change from a ten-hour to an eight-hour work day, on the grounds that many Local Improvement Districts (LIDs) were having trouble competing with railways for labour. John E. Brownlee later said of Greenfield's involvement in the ALID that it was there "that he was first initiated into the discussion of public subjects, and it became the training ground for his subsequent success."

Provincially, Greenfield was originally a Liberal, but along with many other farmers, began to grow dissatisfied with the Liberal government's treatment of farmers. He became involved with the United Farmers of Alberta, which prior to 1919 was a non-partisan lobby group that eschewed direct involvement in the political process. He was elected to the organization's executive in 1919 and chaired its mass conventions in 1920 and 1921. He headed an extremely successful membership drive. Despite this involvement, he did not seek election to the Legislative Assembly of Alberta in the 1921 election. When the UFA, which as part of its resistance to old-style politics had contested the election without designating a leader, won 38 of 61 seats, it found itself needing to form a government without having decided who would head it. Greenfield meanwhile had been named interim Vice President of the organization after the death of Percival Baker.

The logical choice was UFA President Henry Wise Wood. However, Wood had little taste for the minutiae of government, preferring to remain at the head of what he saw as a broader political movement (saying he would "sooner be President of the UFA than the USA"), and saw party lawyer Brownlee as the best choice. Brownlee, who, like Wood, had not contested the election, said he felt that the Premier must be a farmer for the aspirations of the UFA's base to be fulfilled. George Hoadley, one of the two UFA members with previous legislative experience (Hoadley had been a sitting Conservative MLA prior to the election; UFA MLA Alex Moore had been elected in a by-election a few months before the general election), was considered, but since his previous experience had been as a Conservative—one of the old line parties so disdained by the UFA — he was deemed unacceptable. There was even some speculation that incumbent Liberal Premier Charles Stewart, who had become a member of the UFA before it entered politics directly, would stay on as Premier, but he immediately announced that he would serve only until the UFA selected a leader. A meeting of the UFA caucus in Calgary selected Greenfield, and he took office as Premier on August 13, 1921.

== Premier ==
Greenfield took office as Premier amid great expectations. The Lethbridge Herald called him "the only new Moses that can bridge the Red Sea", while the Calgary Herald noted that "no government ever went into office in this country carrying better wishes for its success". He also took office without a seat in the legislature. This latter circumstance was addressed through the voluntary resignation of Donald MacBeth Kennedy, who had won the riding of Peace River for the UFA. Greenfield won the seat by acclamation on December 9, 1921.

=== Legislature and cabinet ===
Once in the legislature, however, Greenfield faltered in his leadership of his caucus. The UFA MLAs came from a determinedly independent and non-partisan background and proved nearly impossible to whip. When Greenfield selected his cabinet and was about to announce it to his caucus for their vetting, he was interrupted by Lorne Proudfoot who asked whether, in addition to the rumoured inclusion of Labour members, the cabinet would include any of the fourteen Liberal MLAs. Proudfoot argued that to exclude them would be to "start out much after the matter of the old parties". Greenfield had not intended this, and suggested that no Liberals would likely be amenable to it. Irene Parlby, the caucus's only woman (who Greenfield would shortly name as Alberta's first female cabinet minister) agreed, and suggested that the UFA's ideal of securing representation for all economic groups in society did not apply to the Liberals, who were not an economic group and were not democratically organized in any event. Proudfoot's proposal was defeated sixteen votes to fourteen. Greenfield went on to name the seven member cabinet he had intended, including Labour MLA Alex Ross as Minister of Public Works, Parlby as Minister Without Portfolio, and Greenfield himself as Provincial Treasurer.

Once the legislature convened in 1922, the inexperience of the Premier and his caucus was further laid bare. Greenfield, devastated by the sudden death of his wife, turned in a poor performance. Faced with an aggressive attack by new Liberal leader John R. Boyle, Greenfield relied heavily on Attorney General John Brownlee, who sat next to him in the Legislature, to provide the defense. The session got off to an inauspicious start: Greenfield nominated the government's preferred candidate for speaker, Oran McPherson, only to have one of his backbenchers, Alex Moore, nominate Independent Conservative John Smith Stewart; Stewart spared the government embarrassment by declining the nomination.

Moore, along with fellow UFA backbencher John Russell Love, caused the government further trouble with a resolution aiming to limit the circumstances under which the government would have to resign. By convention of the Westminster system, a government was required to resign on the defeat of any piece of its legislation that was critical to its program. Moore and Love objected to the manner in which this provision could be expected to pressure UFA MLAs to back government legislation that they might otherwise be inclined to oppose, and introduced a resolution in the Legislature that called for a policy by which the government would resign only upon passage of an explicit motion of no confidence. The resolution caught the attention of politicians across Canada, including future Prime Minister R. B. Bennett, who warned that it was unconstitutional. Brownlee moved an amendment that reduced the resolution to a vague statement of principle, which passed and was not heard of again.

UFA members also objected to the concept of a caucus, in which MLAs from one party debate policy behind closed doors. They believed that the role of an MLA was to represent the views of his or her constituents directly on the floor of the Legislature. This belief too proved problematic to the government. The Dairyman's Act had been adopted by the Liberal government to provide low-interest loans to dairy farmers. It was unpopular among farmers, and Greenfield's government aimed to amend it. Many UFA backbenchers, however, wanted to see it repealed altogether, but because of their objection to caucus discussions Greenfield was not aware of this by the time his amendments came to the floor of the legislature. They passed through the house with little debate, until just after third reading, when one of the backbenchers rose to ask if the time had come to speak against the bill. Brownlee suggested that, in view of the legislators' inexperience with parliamentary procedure, the legislature consider the motion to adopt the bill on third reading as not yet having passed, that debate might ensue. This suggestion adopted, several UFA members attacked the Act. They were joined in this by the Liberals, despite the fact that it was a Liberal act that had been co-authored by Boyle. In the end, the bill passed only by virtue of the support of the four Labour members.

More trouble with the legislature struck Greenfield in August 1922, during a special session called for the purpose of passing enabling legislation for a provincial wheat board. The session lasted only a week, and on August 31 the only item of business that remained was the members' pay for the session. The government was proposing $100 per member, but some MLAs complained that this was insufficient in light of the long travel times between Edmonton and their constituencies. Greenfield, lacking the counsel of the vacationing Brownlee and wanting to avoid trouble, proposed upping the amount to $200. Independent MLA Robert Pearson proposed increasing it once again, to $250, to match what their counterparts in Saskatchewan had received. This suggestion was carried. While Greenfield had hardly been the driving force behind the increases, he had facilitated them and had been blind to the appearance of paying MLAs more for six afternoons of work than some farmers were able to earn in a year. The grassroots of his own party condemned the move, all the more so when the wheat board that had been the purpose of the special session failed to come to fruition.

=== Agriculture ===
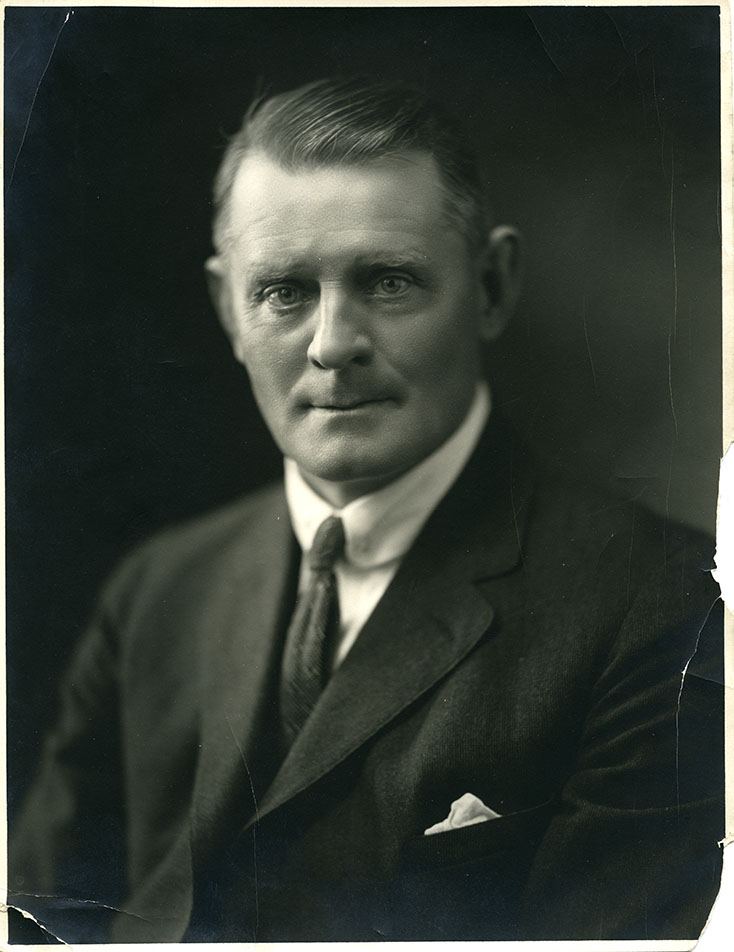
Portrait of Herbert Greenfield, c. 1918

Greenfield became Premier at a time of agricultural depression, especially in the province's south. The region, which was responsible for approximately 75% of Alberta's wheat production, was in the midst of its fifth consecutive year of drought, and the farmers who had been responsible for putting the UFA into office were now demanding action. Initially, the government offered direct financial assistance, with $5 million provided in seed and grain relief by the end of 1922. However, this effort was driving the province close to bankruptcy, and in 1923 Greenfield announced an end to the handouts (the bill authorizing the last of these was a source of chagrin for MLAs from all parties, both because it marked the end of direct assistance for farmers and because the last of the assistance was itself so expensive). Farmers and political representatives from the affected areas criticized the government bitterly, referencing Greenfield's earlier pledge that "if the south country should fall, then we are prepared to fall with it".

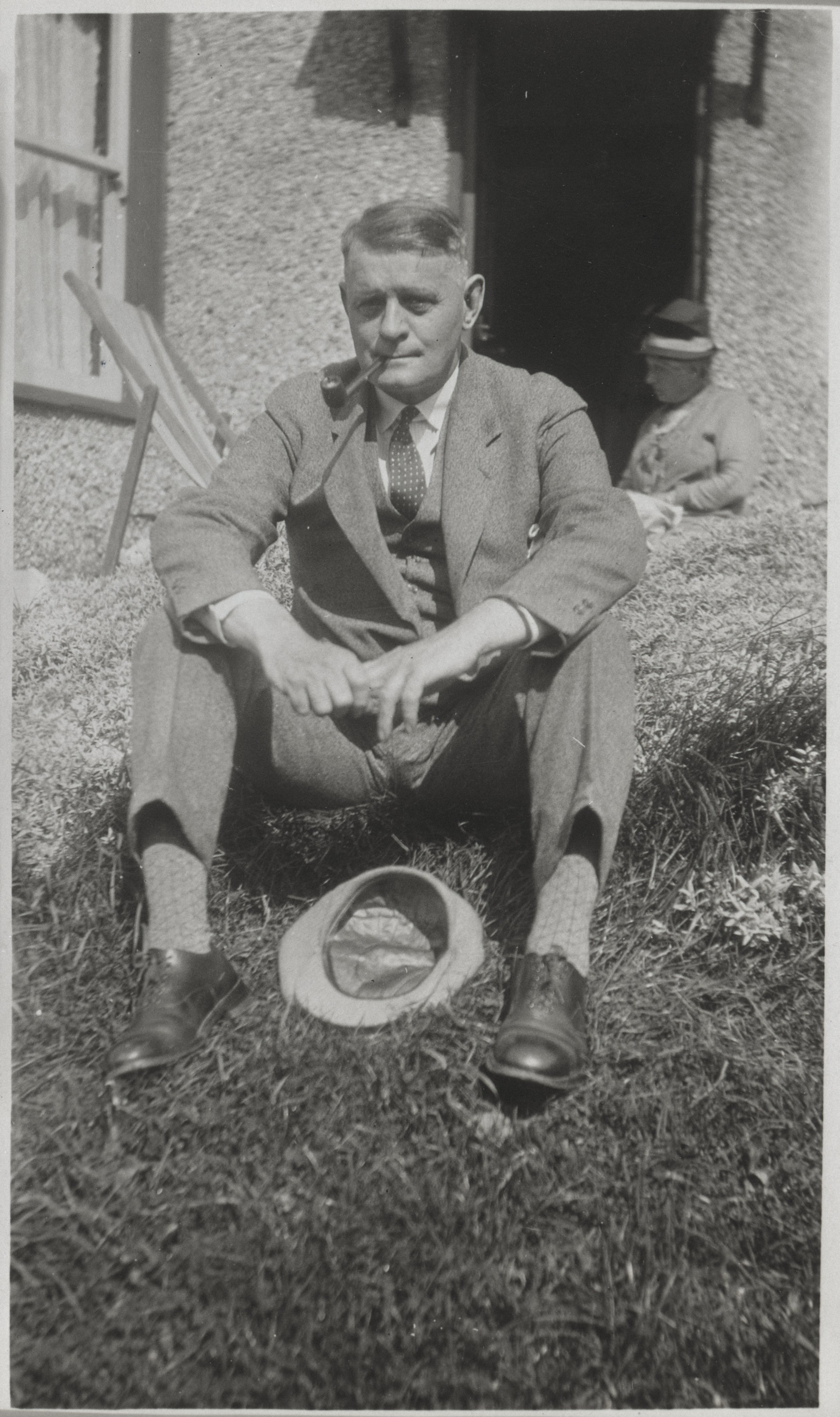
Greenfield in 1924

The government did not give up on addressing the problem when it ended subsidies. It had previously commissioned a number of studies on the agricultural situation and related factors, and converted some of the results of these studies into legislation. The Debt Adjustment Act of 1923 was designed to adjust farmers' debts to a level that they could actually pay, thus allowing them to carry on while still ensuring that creditors received as much as was feasible. In the words of University of Calgary professor David C. Jones, the bill offered "solace, but no real satisfaction". According to Jones, Greenfield's attempts to rescue southern Alberta from agricultural calamity were probably doomed to failure. Even so, Greenfield had called the situation his top priority, and his failure to bring it to a successful resolution cost him politically.

Another preoccupation of the UFA and the Greenfield government was the marketing of wheat. From 1919 to 1920 there had been a federally established wheat pool to stabilize wheat prices. When it was disbanded, wheat prices tumbled by two-thirds, prompting many farmers to call for its re-introduction. At the call of the UFA and farmers' organizations in other provinces, the federal government (whose razor-thin majority in the House of Commons was often widened by the support of farmer-friendly Progressive members) created a new, mandatory agency, pending the appointment by the provincial governments of Alberta and Saskatchewan of a board of directors for the agency. This they proved unable to do. Greenfield's government ultimately admitted defeat and gave up on re-establishing the pool, opting instead to guarantee loans to farmer-run cooperative pools. With government assistance, the Alberta Wheat Pool came into existence in time for the 1923 harvest.

=== Labour unrest ===
During Greenfield's premiership, Alberta's major non-agricultural industry was coal mining, and the industry was not prospering. Production was more than 50% greater than demand, and fewer than half of the province's mines were profitable. The industry as a whole was earning a profit of less than one cent per ton of coal. Miners' wages had more than doubled (in nominal terms) between 1909 and 1920 but had barely held their own against the wartime inflation. In the 1920s mine owners began to roll them back. Besides the low wages, miners were unsatisfied with working conditions in an industry that saw more than 3,300 workplace accidents per year. The results had been labour militancy and violence. A general strike in the industry in 1920 had seen strikers assault strikebreakers, throw them off their bicycles, and throw rocks through the windows of buses. Police were used to aid the strikebreakers and had been sometimes attacked as well. One constable was partially paralyzed from the beating he received. Provincial police commissioner W.C. Bryan was warned against inspecting one strike site in a note reading "You spoilt the strike, and if you go...you will be killed." He went anyway, and was greeted by an ambush in which three bullets were fired into his car, missing him.

The situation was still unsettled after Greenfield became premier in autumn 1921. Greenfield was at a loss as to how to respond to this crisis, complaining that both employees and employers were the most difficult people in the province to deal with and that they showed "very little spirit of compromise". He tried to be balanced in his approach to this labour-employer friction but was not aided by his own Minister of Public Works, Labour MLA Alex Ross, who took the side of the miners and objected to the government's provision of police escorts for strikebreakers. Though the problems originated before Greenfield took office, many Albertans felt that a stronger leader might have been more successful than Greenfield in achieving industrial peace.

=== Prohibition ===
Prohibition had been introduced in Alberta following a 1916 referendum, during which the UFA had advocated for the prohibitionist side. The Liberal version of prohibition was weak, and Greenfield came into office intending to strengthen the legislation. Even by 1920, however, it was becoming apparent that the policy was not working (or, as the Medicine Hat News noted, "Prohibition is now working smoothly. The only thing left is to stop the sale of liquor!"). Greenfield's own MLAs began to grumble about the policy—Archibald Matheson expressed in 1923 the view that "This government has acted as philosopher, guide, and God to the people long enough." Public opinion, too, began to shift against the policy, more rapidly after 1922 when three police officers were killed in the line of duty by bootleggers. The last and most dramatic of these was the murder of Steve Lawson in front of the barracks where he and his family lived, by Emil "Pic" Picariello and Florence Lassandra. Public opinion ran high both for and against the pair, and their 1923 hangings only served to unite both factions against prohibition.

An autumn 1923 referendum saw Albertans vote decisively for the repeal of prohibition, despite the UFA's continuing support for the policy. In response, the government resolved to repeal the Prohibition Act and replaced it with government-controlled liquor sales. Greenfield attempted to make the move more palatable to prohibitionists by proposing that liquor profits be shared with impoverished municipalities. However, the scheme proved unworkable, and the re-legalization went ahead without any such profit-sharing. In 1924, the government introduced legislation to replace prohibition with the regulation of liquor sales by the government, and subjected it to a free vote. While the legislation passed, the new measures were divisive, pitting community leaders who wanted their towns to remain "dry" against those who wanted to apply for liquor licences, and different would-be saloon-keepers against one another in competing for the government-issued licences.

=== Provincial finances ===
At the outset of his premiership, Greenfield served as Provincial Treasurer as well as Premier. In both of these capacities, he was faced with a provincial deficit, which reached an accumulated total of $4 million between his taking office and the end of the 1922 fiscal year. One reason for this was the government's involvement in railways: it had found itself the owner of four uncompleted money-losing railway lines after the private syndicates set up to run them collapsed due to construction cost overruns. By 1922, the government had lost a total of $6.7 million on the endeavor, with an additional $5 million expected to follow that year—37% of the estimated 1922 provincial budget. Greenfield wanted to sell the lines to the Canadian Pacific Railway (CPR), a course of action that was endorsed by Brownlee, but many farmers despised the CPR and most UFA MLAs preferred to keep the lines government-operated. Moreover, Greenfield's own Minister of Railways, Vernor Smith, was among this faction. This problem plagued Greenfield for his entire term as Premier, and it was not until Brownlee succeeded him that a resolution came in the form of a $25 million sale to the major lines.

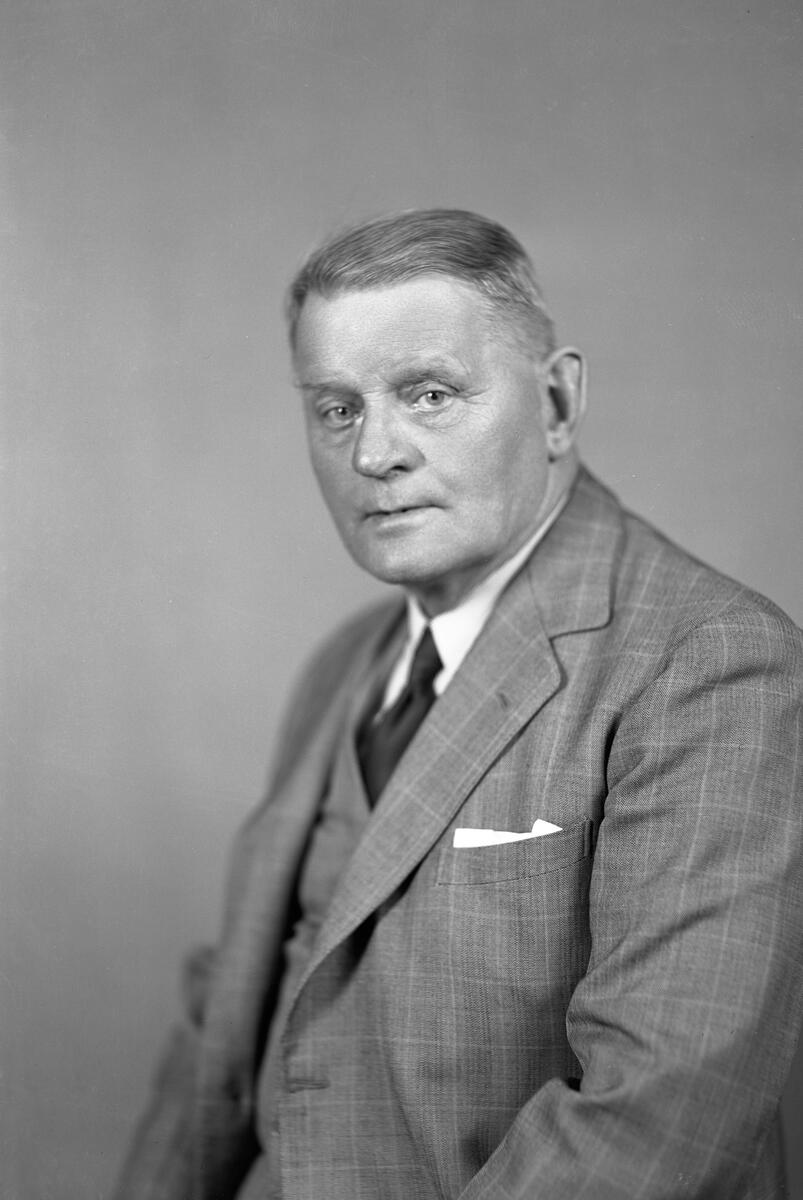
Portrait of Herbert Greenfield

Absent a solution to the railway problem, the government continued its deficits. Brownlee advocated deep cuts in spending to bring them under control, and, when Greenfield demurred, began to cut staff in his own department. He found an ally in Richard Gavin Reid in 1923 when Greenfield, exhausted by his responsibilities, appointed the latter to replace him as Provincial Treasurer. Reid impressed on the cabinet the need for drastic economy in all departments and, by 1925 (the last year of Greenfield's Premiership), the government at last showed a surplus, a state that would persist until the beginning of the Great Depression, with the exception of a small deficit in 1927.

=== Natural resources ===
At the time that Alberta was made a province in 1905, the federal government retained control of its natural resources (though it provided financial compensation to the new provincial government for this), a fact that set it apart from the older provinces. By 1925, negotiations to alter this state of affairs had been ongoing for more than a decade, and the two levels of government had an agreement in principle. Despite this, Alberta Liberal leader John R. Boyle sent a letter to his fellow Liberal, Canadian Prime Minister William Lyon Mackenzie King, pleading with him to delay any agreement until after the expected 1925 election so that the UFA could not claim success. Greenfield and Brownlee attended a series of meetings with federal representatives beginning May 19 in Ottawa; these continued until June 7, whereupon Brownlee returned home. Greenfield offered to stay, but on June 11 King told him that the cabinet would need the summer to consider the question and that no agreement would be immediately forthcoming. This decision did not help the Alberta Liberals, who went on to lose the next election soundly, and did not prevent the transfer of resource rights, which took place in 1929, but was enough to rob Greenfield of his glory; he left office the next year.

=== Provincial banking ===
It was the longstanding view of a segment of the UFA that the Alberta government should enter the banking business directly by obtaining a bank charter from the federal government (which has responsibility for banking under the Canadian constitution). In fact, UFA President William John Tregillus had included the idea in a speech he gave on his goals for the organization in 1913. At the UFA convention in 1923, a proponent of provincial banking, George Bevington, made a passionate speech in favour of this idea, bringing most of the membership around to his side. The convention passed a resolution in favour of the idea (along with one calling on the provincial treasury to establish a loan department, an idea that came to fruition fifteen years later with the creation of Alberta Treasury Branches), against the stiff opposition of Attorney-General Brownlee. Brownlee's opposition stemmed in part from investigations that Greenfield's government had already undertaken into the subject: information was gathered from similar experiments in New Zealand and New South Wales, leading to the conclusion that, while there would be some benefit to a provincially owned bank, Alberta "had neither the economic nor constitutional base to consider such a scheme". This conclusion was affirmed by University of Alberta professor D. A. MacGibbon in a government-commissioned study.

At the 1924 UFA convention, Bevington and his followers moved a resolution calling for immediate action on the previous year's banking resolution. Against them stood Greenfield's government, UFA president Henry Wise Wood (whom Bevington was challenging for re-election), and radical Labour Member of Parliament William Irvine. Thanks to Irvine's surprising intervention on the side of the conservatives, the resolution was soundly defeated.

== Departure from politics ==
Greenfield's political stock fell during the course of his time as Premier. His arrival was heralded with great expectations of economic and political reform. After the 1921 federal election, Progressive Party of Canada leader Thomas Crerar was considering a merger of his party with the Liberal Party of Canada and asked Greenfield to join him as Alberta's representative in the federal cabinet upon completion of this merger. This initially lofty stature was reduced by incident after incident: his reliance on Brownlee in the legislature and elsewhere, his failure to deliver on the promised economic relief, and his alienation of the radical wing of his own party.

By 1924, many of Greenfield's own backbenchers had had enough and hatched a plan to force Greenfield's resignation and replace him with Brownlee, who was perceived as more likely to lead the UFA to victory in the impending election. This group—which included George Johnston, George MacLachlan, William Shield, Donald Cameron, Oran McPherson, and Austin Claypool—contacted Brownlee to alert him to their intentions and were taken aback when the Attorney-General told them that if Greenfield resigned, so would he.

The following year, the group approached Greenfield directly to ask for his resignation. He initially agreed, but then vacillated long enough for Brownlee to once again pledge his loyalty to the Premier. This time, Henry Wise Wood intervened to ask Brownlee to reconsider, which he agreed to do only if Greenfield himself made the request. The Premier immediately did so, saying that he had never wanted the job in the first place. On November 23, Greenfield resigned as Premier of Alberta, tearfully telling the media that he was "through with politics". He never again ran for elected office.

The media judged the rebellion harshly. The Calgary Herald mocked the rebels as a "group of farmer politicians who have always claimed to be purer than those of other parties" and yet "[threw] their leader to the wolves in the hope that they may save their own skins". It concluded: "Greenfield was not a good political captain, but he had a poor set of officers and a mutinous crew."

== Later life ==
In 1927, Greenfield was appointed Alberta's Agent General in London, England. The appointment was controversial and was perceived as a patronage reward even by some UFA backbenchers. Liberals also accused the government of benefiting the Hudson's Bay Company, which owned the London office that the government leased, more than Alberta. Even so, Greenfield's performance in the position was well regarded: his personality was better-suited for his duties there, which included the promotion of Alberta's burgeoning oil and gas industry, attracting English immigration to Alberta, and acting as a guide for Albertans visiting London. It was in this last capacity that he welcomed Brownlee to London, where the two met together with British immigration and financial officials.

In 1931, the Agent General's office closed, and Greenfield returned to Alberta, settling in Calgary. There he entered the oil and gas business, serving as a director (and later vice president) of Calmont Oils, president of the Oil and Gas Association, president of the Alberta Petroleum Association, and director of Home Oil. He also served as managing director of the British Dominion Land Settlement Corporation and as president of the Calgary Board of Trade. He spent the rest of his life in the city, maintaining an office in the General Trusts Building.

Greenfield died at 8:25 in the morning of August 23, 1949. His funeral took place at Grace Presbyterian Church and he is buried in Union Cemetery, both of which are in Calgary. In 1968, Greenfield School, an elementary school in Edmonton, was named in his honour.

== See also ==
- John Brownlee as Attorney-General of Alberta
