= Tanya Kappo =

Indigenous rights activist

- Born: Sturgeon Lake Cree Nation
- Education: University of Manitoba
- Known for: Idle No More

Tanya Kappo (Cree) is an Indigenous rights activist. She is one of the four women who co-founded Idle No More and was briefly the manager of community relations for Canada's National Public Inquiry into Missing and Murdered Indigenous Women and Girls.

== Early life and education ==
Kappo is from the Sturgeon Lake Cree Nation in Treaty 8 Territory and was raised on the Northwestern Alberta Reserve in Sturgeon Lake. Her father was Harold Cardinal, author of The Red Paper. She graduated the University of Manitoba with a J.D. in 2012.

== Activism and career ==
Kappo is one of the four women who co-founded the Idle No More movement in November 2012. Kappo described the impetus for founding the movement as "the legislation facing First Nations, primarily Bill C-45". Kappo co-edited the book The Winter We Danced: Voices From the Past, the Future, and the Idle No More Movement.

Kappo was hired as the community relations for the National Inquiry into Missing and Murdered Indigenous Women in early 2017. She resigned from the inquiry in June 2017. In November, 2017, Kappo emceed the symposium, Indigenous Climate Action: An Indigenous led climate change initiative. In 2020 she was working as a lawyer in Alberta.

=== Electoral politics ===
In 2006, Kappo ran for the Liberal Party of Canada in the federal election in the riding of Peace River (Alberta). She lost to Conservative candidate Chris Warkentin.

2006 Canadian federal election: Peace River
Party	Candidate	Votes	%	±%	Expenditures
Conservative	Chris Warkentin	27,785	56.97	–8.16	$63,836.70
Independent	Bill Given	9,882	20.26	–	$99,770.88
New Democratic	Susan Thompson	5,427	11.13	+0.02	$20,084.33
Liberal	Tanya Kappo	4,573	9.38	–9.59	$6,598.04
Green	Zane Lewis	1,102	2.26	–2.54	none listed
Total valid votes/expense limit		48,769	99.77	–	$106,290.48
Total rejected ballots		113	0.23	–0.06	
Turnout		48,882	54.73	+1.00	
Eligible voters		89,318			
Conservative hold		Swing		–14.21	
Source: Elections Canada

== Personal life ==
Kappo has three children and lives in Edmonton.
