= Peace River (federal electoral district) =

Former federal electoral district in Alberta, Canada

Alberta electoral district
- Peace River in relation to the other Alberta federal electoral districts

Defunct federal electoral district
- Legislature: House of Commons
- District created: 1924
- District abolished: 2013
- First contested: 1925
- Last contested: 2011
- District webpage: profile, map

Demographics
- Population (2011): 150,925
- Electors (2011): 96,378
- Area (km²): 168,289.57
- Census division(s): Division No. 10, Division No. 17, Division No. 19
- Census subdivision(s): Grande Prairie, Grande Prairie County No. 1, Mackenzie County, Peace River, Big Lakes, Greenview No. 16, High Level, County of Northern Lights, Fairview, Opportunity No. 17

Peace River was a federal electoral district in Alberta, Canada, that was represented in the House of Commons of Canada from 1925 to 2015. It was a rural riding in northwest Alberta, representing Clear Hills County, Saddle Hills County, Birch Hills County, the County of Grande Prairie No. 1, the County of Northern Lights, Mackenzie County, most of Northern Sunrise County, the Municipal District of Fairview No. 136, the Municipal District of Peace No. 135, the Municipal District of Spirit River No. 133, the Municipal District of Smoky River No. 130 and the northern portion of the Municipal District of Greenview No. 16. Following the Canadian federal electoral redistribution, 2012 the riding abolished into Grande Prairie-Mackenzie (72%) and Peace River—Westlock (28%).

== History ==
This riding was created in 1924 from Edmonton West riding.

=== Historical boundaries ===
1924 representation order

1933 representation order

1952 representation order

1966 representation order

1976 representation order

1987 representation order

1996 representation order

2003 representation order

=== Members of Parliament ===
This riding has elected the following members of the House of Commons of Canada:

Parliament	Years	Member	Party
Peace River; Riding created from Edmonton West
15th	1925–1926	Donald MacBeth Kennedy	Progressive
16th	1926–1930	Donald MacBeth Kennedy	United Farmers
17th	1930–1935	Donald MacBeth Kennedy	United Farmers
18th	1935–1940	René-Antoine Pelletier	Social Credit
19th	1940–1945	John Sissons	Liberal
20th	1945–1949	Solon Earl Low	Social Credit
21st	1949–1953	Solon Earl Low	Social Credit
22nd	1953–1957	Solon Earl Low	Social Credit
23rd	1957–1958	Solon Earl Low	Social Credit
24th	1958–1962	Ged Baldwin	Progressive Conservative
25th	1962–1963	Ged Baldwin	Progressive Conservative
26th	1963–1965	Ged Baldwin	Progressive Conservative
27th	1965–1968	Ged Baldwin	Progressive Conservative
28th	1968–1972	Ged Baldwin	Progressive Conservative
29th	1972–1974	Ged Baldwin	Progressive Conservative
30th	1974–1979	Ged Baldwin	Progressive Conservative
31st	1979–1980	Ged Baldwin	Progressive Conservative
32nd	1980–1984	Albert Cooper	Progressive Conservative
33rd	1984–1988	Albert Cooper	Progressive Conservative
34th	1988–1993	Albert Cooper	Progressive Conservative
35th	1993–1997	Charlie Penson	Reform
36th	1997–2000	Charlie Penson	Reform
36th	2000–2000	Charlie Penson	Alliance
37th	2000–2003	Charlie Penson	Alliance
37th	2003–2004	Charlie Penson	Conservative
38th	2004–2006	Charlie Penson	Conservative
39th	2006–2008	Chris Warkentin	Conservative
40th	2008–2011	Chris Warkentin	Conservative
41st	2011–2015	Chris Warkentin	Conservative
Riding dissolved into Grande Prairie-Mackenzie and Peace River—Westlock

== Election results ==
2011 Canadian federal election
Party	Candidate	Votes	%	±%	Expenditures
Conservative	Chris Warkentin	36,334	75.76	+6.24	$46,666.18
New Democratic	Jennifer Villebrun	7,740	16.14	+1.73	$17,743.20
Green	Wayne John Kamieniecki	1,702	3.55	–4.22	$1,264.14
Liberal	Corina Ganton	1,481	3.09	–3.60	$4,872.25
Independent	Russ Toews	359	0.75	–	$203.93
Rhinoceros	Donovan Eckstrom	345	0.72	–	none listed
Total valid votes/expense limit		47,961	99.73	–	$123,491.94
Total rejected ballots		128	0.27	–0.03	
Turnout		48,089	49.00	+4.76	
Eligible voters		98,135			
Conservative hold		Swing		+3.99	
Source: Elections Canada

2008 Canadian federal election
Party	Candidate	Votes	%	±%	Expenditures
Conservative	Chris Warkentin	29,550	69.52	+12.54	$47,891.22
New Democratic	Adele Boucher Rymhs	6,124	14.41	+3.28	$18,963.61
Green	Jennifer Villebrun	3,303	7.77	+5.51	$1,611.56
Liberal	Liliane Maisonneuve	2,843	6.69	–2.69	$7,607.24
Canadian Action	Edwin Siggelkow	373	0.88	–	$4,711.06
Libertarian	Mélanie Simard	316	0.74	–	$1,313.62
Total valid votes/expense limit		42,509	99.70	–	$118,949.24
Total rejected ballots		129	0.30	+0.07	
Turnout		42,638	44.24	–10.49	
Eligible voters		96,378			
Conservative hold		Swing		+4.63	
Source: Elections Canada

2006 Canadian federal election
Party	Candidate	Votes	%	±%	Expenditures
Conservative	Chris Warkentin	27,785	56.97	–8.16	$63,836.70
Independent	Bill Given	9,882	20.26	–	$99,770.88
New Democratic	Susan Thompson	5,427	11.13	+0.02	$20,084.33
Liberal	Tanya Kappo	4,573	9.38	–9.59	$6,598.04
Green	Zane Lewis	1,102	2.26	–2.54	none listed
Total valid votes/expense limit		48,769	99.77	–	$106,290.48
Total rejected ballots		113	0.23	–0.06	
Turnout		48,882	54.73	+1.00	
Eligible voters		89,318			
Conservative hold		Swing		–14.21	
Source: Elections Canada

2004 Canadian federal election
Party	Candidate	Votes	%	±%	Expenditures
Conservative	Charlie Penson	28,158	65.13	–12.44	$64,760.07
Liberal	Lyle Carlstrom	8,200	18.97	+3.48	$82,073.04
New Democratic	Susan Thompson	4,804	11.11	+4.17	$10,960.54
Green	Benjamin Morrison Pettit	2,073	4.80	–	$1,434.25
Total valid votes/expense limit		43,235	99.71	–	$98,522.19
Total rejected ballots		125	0.29	+0.03	
Turnout		43,360	53.73	–1.33	
Eligible voters		80,705			
Conservative hold		Swing		–7.96	
Source: Elections Canada

2000 Canadian federal election
Party	Candidate	Votes	%	±%	Expenditures
Alliance	Charlie Penson	27,508	65.59	+6.65	$45,093
Liberal	Kim Ksenia Fenton	6,495	15.49	–3.61	$5,773
Progressive Conservative	Milton Hommy	5,021	11.97	–4.12	$10,973
New Democratic	Patricia Lawrence	2,914	6.95	+1.08	$6,931
Total valid votes		41,938	99.74		
Total rejected ballots		111	0.26	+0.06	
Turnout		42,049	55.06	+1.42	
Eligible voters		76,363			
Alliance hold		Swing		+5.13	
Source: Elections Canada

1997 Canadian federal election
Party	Candidate	Votes	%	±%	Expenditures
Reform	Charlie Penson	22,351	58.94	–1.29	$55,260
Liberal	David A. Biltek	7,241	19.09	+3.60	$60,269
Progressive Conservative	John Simpson	6,104	16.10	+1.73	$39,665
New Democratic	Ray A. Domeij	2,226	5.87	+0.39	$7,223
Total valid votes		37,922	99.80		
Total rejected ballots		77	0.20	–0.04	
Turnout		37,999	53.64	–8.15	
Eligible voters		70,838			
Reform hold		Swing		–2.44	
Source: Elections Canada

1993 Canadian federal election
Party	Candidate	Votes	%	±%
Reform	Charlie Penson	25,761	60.22	+45.06
Liberal	Joshua Phillpotts	6,629	15.50	+2.12
Progressive Conservative	Alan Y. Tanaka	6,144	14.36	–39.92
New Democratic	Jacquie Gaboury	2,344	5.48	–11.69
National	David Ridgeway	1,656	3.87	–
Natural Law	Roni Shapka	241	0.56	–
Total valid votes		42,775	99.76	
Total rejected ballots		105	0.24	+0.01
Turnout		42,880	61.79	–8.86
Eligible voters		69,401		
Reform gain from Progressive Conservative		Swing		–
Source: Elections Canada

1988 Canadian federal election
Party	Candidate	Votes	%	±%
Progressive Conservative	Albert Cooper	23,363	54.29	–7.95
New Democratic	Norman Dyck	7,389	17.17	+1.80
Reform	Daniel H. Fletcher	6,525	15.16	–
Liberal	Helen A. Rice	5,758	13.38	+0.23
Total valid votes		43,035	99.77	
Total rejected ballots		98	0.23	+0.03
Turnout		43,133	70.65	+3.72
Eligible voters		61,055		
Progressive Conservative hold		Swing		–4.88
Source: Elections Canada

1984 Canadian federal election
Party	Candidate	Votes	%	±%
Progressive Conservative	Albert Cooper	25,648	62.24	+2.89
New Democratic	Elroy Deiment	6,333	15.37	–1.66
Liberal	Richard Marceau	5,419	13.15	–6.40
Confederation of Regions	Ted Krause	2,877	6.98	–
Green	Marion Loring	578	1.40	–
Social Credit	Rob Sweigard	354	0.86	–0.59
Total valid votes		41,209	99.80	
Total rejected ballots		83	0.20	–0.06
Turnout		41,292	66.93	+9.37
Eligible voters		61,690		
Progressive Conservative hold		Swing		+2.27
Source: Elections Canada

1980 Canadian federal election
Party	Candidate	Votes	%	±%
Progressive Conservative	Albert Cooper	18,953	59.35	–3.79
Liberal	Linus H. Becher	6,243	19.55	+0.34
New Democratic	Earle J. Guertin	5,436	17.02	–0.63
Rhinoceros	Allan G.W. Cavanagh	547	1.71	–
Social Credit	Ken Sweigard	462	1.45	–
Independent	A. Wallace Robertson	291	0.91	–
Total valid votes		31,932	99.74	
Total rejected ballots		83	0.26	–0.05
Turnout		32,015	57.56	–4.88
Eligible voters		55,620		
Progressive Conservative hold		Swing		–2.06
Source: Elections Canada

1979 Canadian federal election
Party	Candidate	Votes	%	±%
Progressive Conservative	Ged Baldwin	20,748	63.14	+2.55
Liberal	Linus H. Becher	6,312	19.21	–2.49
New Democratic	Earle J. Guertin	5,801	17.65	+0.78
Total valid votes		32,861	99.69	
Total rejected ballots		101	0.31	+0.00
Turnout		32,962	62.44	–1.60
Eligible voters		52,792		
Progressive Conservative hold		Swing		+2.52
Source: Elections Canada

1974 Canadian federal election
Party	Candidate	Votes	%	±%
Progressive Conservative	Ged Baldwin	14,153	60.59	+4.52
Liberal	Ed Kimpe	5,068	21.70	+8.62
New Democratic	Anne Hemmingway	3,941	16.87	–5.46
Independent	Michael Zuk	196	0.84	–
Total valid votes		23,358	99.69	
Total rejected ballots		72	0.31	–0.89
Turnout		23,430	64.04	–7.20
Eligible voters		36,588		
Progressive Conservative hold		Swing		–
Source: Library of Parliament

1972 Canadian federal election
Party	Candidate	Votes	%	±%
Progressive Conservative	Ged Baldwin	14,255	56.08	+0.49
New Democratic	Jake Van Voorst	5,678	22.34	–0.37
Liberal	Ed Kimpe	3,324	13.08	–8.64
Social Credit	Joseph Donovan Ross	1,904	7.49	–
Independent	Gertrude Bryan	119	0.47	–
Independent	Michael Zuk	74	0.29	–
Independent	Wayne Lovely	67	0.26	–
Total valid votes		25,421	98.80	
Total rejected ballots		310	1.20	+0.52
Turnout		25,731	71.24	+1.06
Eligible voters		36,117		
Progressive Conservative hold		Swing		+0.43
Source: Library of Parliament

1968 Canadian federal election
Party	Candidate	Votes	%	±%
Progressive Conservative	Ged Baldwin	11,825	55.58	+1.48
New Democratic	Phil Thompson	4,830	22.70	+6.75
Liberal	Don Branigan	4,620	21.72	+8.78
Total valid votes		21,275	99.32	
Total rejected ballots		145	0.68	–0.13
Turnout		21,420	70.18	+1.54
Eligible voters		30,521		
Progressive Conservative hold		Swing		–
Source: Library of Parliament

1965 Canadian federal election
Party	Candidate	Votes	%	±%
Progressive Conservative	Ged Baldwin	14,960	54.11	–4.49
Social Credit	James A. Smith	4,700	17.00	–6.88
New Democratic	Allan Frederick Bush	4,411	15.95	+9.55
Liberal	Charlie MacDonell	3,578	12.94	+1.82
Total valid votes		27,649	99.19	
Total rejected ballots		225	0.81	+0.19
Turnout		27,874	68.64	–1.80
Eligible voters		40,610		
Progressive Conservative hold		Swing		+5.68
Source: Library of Parliament

1963 Canadian federal election
Party	Candidate	Votes	%	±%
Progressive Conservative	Ged Baldwin	16,111	58.60	+10.43
Social Credit	James A. Smith	6,564	23.87	–4.52
Liberal	Fred Noble	3,059	11.13	–2.58
New Democratic	Irvin Victor Macklin	1,760	6.40	–3.33
Total valid votes		27,494	99.38	
Total rejected ballots		172	0.62	–0.24
Turnout		27,666	70.44	–2.03
Eligible voters		39,275		
Progressive Conservative hold		Swing		+7.48
Source: Library of Parliament

1962 Canadian federal election
Party	Candidate	Votes	%	±%
Progressive Conservative	Ged Baldwin	12,897	48.17	–10.64
Social Credit	Budd M. Dennis	7,603	28.40	+3.08
Liberal	S.P. Tachit	3,671	13.71	+2.53
New Democratic	Richard F. Brown	2,605	9.73	+5.03
Total valid votes		26,776	99.14	
Total rejected ballots		232	0.86	+0.26
Turnout		27,008	72.47	+5.92
Eligible voters		37,270		
Progressive Conservative hold		Swing		–6.86
Source: Library of Parliament

1958 Canadian federal election
Party	Candidate	Votes	%	±%
Progressive Conservative	Ged Baldwin	13,328	58.81	+34.03
Social Credit	Solon Earl Low	5,737	25.31	–18.36
Liberal	John Howard McRae	2,535	11.19	–11.99
Co-operative Commonwealth	Emil Trygve Sather	1,064	4.70	–2.80
Total valid votes		22,664	99.40	
Total rejected ballots		136	0.60	–0.26
Turnout		22,800	66.55	–4.55
Eligible voters		34,262		
Progressive Conservative gain from Social Credit		Swing		+26.20
Source: Library of Parliament

1957 Canadian federal election
Party	Candidate	Votes	%	±%
Social Credit	Solon Earl Low	10,393	43.67	–5.38
Progressive Conservative	Ged Baldwin	5,896	24.77	–
Liberal	John Howard McRae	5,515	23.17	–13.54
Co-operative Commonwealth	Clarence John Lampert	1,783	7.49	–2.55
Independent	Harry Wigiluk	212	0.89	–
Total valid votes		23,799	99.14	
Total rejected ballots		207	0.86	+0.00
Turnout		24,006	71.10	+5.71
Eligible voters		33,763		
Social Credit hold		Swing		–15.08
Source: Library of Parliament

1953 Canadian federal election
Party	Candidate	Votes	%	±%
Social Credit	Solon Earl Low	10,151	49.05	+10.21
Liberal	Clifford Bernard Carignan	7,599	36.72	–0.50
Co-operative Commonwealth	Samuel David Simpson	2,079	10.05	–6.05
Labor–Progressive	Bernard Rudolf Swankey	867	4.19	–
Total valid votes		20,696	99.14	
Total rejected ballots		180	0.86	–0.26
Turnout		20,876	65.39	–5.09
Eligible voters		31,925		
Social Credit hold		Swing		+5.35
Source: Library of Parliament

1949 Canadian federal election
Party	Candidate	Votes	%	±%
Social Credit	Solon Earl Low	7,727	38.84	–2.22
Liberal	Clifford Bernard Carignan	7,404	37.22	+14.16
Co-operative Commonwealth	Irvin Victor Macklin	3,202	16.09	–4.47
Progressive Conservative	David Thomson Williamson	1,562	7.85	–7.48
Total valid votes		19,895	98.88	
Total rejected ballots		226	1.12	–1.51
Turnout		20,121	70.48	–2.93
Eligible voters		28,550		
Social Credit hold		Swing		–8.19
Source: Library of Parliament

1945 Canadian federal election
Party	Candidate	Votes	%	±%
Social Credit	Solon Earl Low	7,319	41.06	+6.71
Liberal	John Sissons	4,109	23.05	–18.23
Co-operative Commonwealth	Irvin Victor Macklin	3,666	20.57	–0.68
Progressive Conservative	Herbert Gordon Bessent	2,732	15.33	–
Total valid votes		17,826	97.37	
Total rejected ballots		481	2.63	+1.52
Turnout		18,307	73.41	+11.38
Eligible voters		24,937		
Social Credit gain from Liberal		Swing		+12.47
Source: Library of Parliament

1940 Canadian federal election
Party	Candidate	Votes	%	±%
Liberal	John Sissons	6,426	41.28	+10.71
New Democracy	René-Antoine Pelletier	5,347	34.35	–13.18
Co-operative Commonwealth	Irvin Victor Macklin	3,307	21.24	+7.05
Independent	Louis-Napoléon Brulotte	488	3.14	–
Total valid votes		15,568	98.89	
Total rejected ballots		174	1.11	–0.43
Turnout		15,742	62.03	+9.53
Eligible voters		25,380		
Liberal gain from Social Credit		Swing		+11.94
Source: Library of Parliament

1935 Canadian federal election
Party	Candidate	Votes	%	±%
Social Credit	René-Antoine Pelletier	5,513	47.52	–
Liberal	Joseph Patrick McIsaac	3,546	30.57	–14.56
Co-operative Commonwealth	Donald MacBeth Kennedy	1,646	14.19	–
Conservative	Ernest Vincent Bergin	896	7.72	–
Total valid votes		11,601	98.46	
Total rejected ballots		182	1.54	+1.54
Turnout		11,783	52.50	–6.08
Eligible voters		22,443		
Social Credit gain from United Farmers of Alberta		Swing		–
Source: Library of Parliament

1930 Canadian federal election
Party	Candidate	Votes	%	±%
United Farmers of Alberta	Donald MacBeth Kennedy	10,204	54.88	+11.82
Liberal	John Ewing Thomson	8,390	45.12	+23.75
Total valid votes		18,594	100.00	
Total rejected ballots		–		
Turnout		18,594	58.58	+2.25
Eligible voters		31,741		
United Farmers of Alberta hold		Swing		–
Source: Library of Parliament

1926 Canadian federal election
Party	Candidate	Votes	%	±%
United Farmers of Alberta	Donald MacBeth Kennedy	5,323	43.06	+9.56
Conservative	James Arthur Collins	4,398	35.57	+2.22
Liberal	Joseph Clarke	2,642	21.37	–11.78
Total valid votes		12,363	100.00	
Total rejected ballots		–		
Turnout		12,363	56.33	+1.24
Eligible voters		21,949		
United Farmers of Alberta gain from Progressive		Swing		–
Source: Library of Parliament

1925 Canadian federal election
Party	Candidate	Votes	%	±%
Progressive	Donald MacBeth Kennedy	3,986	33.50	–
Conservative	James Arthur Collins	3,969	33.36	–
Liberal	William Archibald Rae	3,944	33.15	–
Total valid votes		11,899	100.00	
Total rejected ballots		–		
Turnout		11,899	55.09	–
Eligible voters		21,600		
Progressive notional gain		Swing		–
Source: Library of Parliament

== See also ==
- List of Canadian electoral districts
- Historical federal electoral districts of Canada
