= Peace River Airport =

- IATA: YPE; ICAO: CYPE; WMO: 71068

Summary
- Airport type: Public
- Owner/Operator: Peace River Regional Airport Authority
- Location: Municipal District of Peace No. 135, near Peace River, Alberta
- Time zone: Alberta Time (UTC−06:00)
- Elevation AMSL: 1,872 ft / 571 m
- Coordinates: 56°13′38″N 117°26′54″W

Map
- Location in Alberta

Runways
Direction	Length		Surface
Direction	ft	m	Surface
04/22	5,000	1,524	Asphalt

Statistics (2010)
- Aircraft movements: 8,687
- Sources: Canada Flight Supplement; Environment Canada; Movements from Statistics Canada

Peace River Airport (IATA: YPE, ICAO: CYPE) is owned by the Peace River Regional Airport Association. The airport is located 5 nautical miles (9.3 km; 5.8 mi) west of the Town of Peace River, Alberta, Canada. The airport has one runway, which is 5,000 ft × 150 ft (1,524 m × 46 m), and a terminal building, which is 2,000 m^{2} (21,000 sq ft).

The airport was the hub of Peace Air until the airline ceased operations in May 2007.

== History ==
The first airport in the area was located on the west bank of the Peace River, about 3 mi (4.8 km) south of the present town site. The site was abandoned when one of Grant McConachie's pilots had a near fatal accident on landing a United Air Transport Limited airline, which was headquartered at the Edmonton Municipal Airport. Historical records indicate that the present site (NW Section 29, Township 83, Range 22, West of the 5th Meridian) was picked by the famous Wop May.

Originally the airport had three runways: 04/22, 08/26 and 18/36. Of the three runways shown by the original configuration, one is still operating: 04/22. In the fall of 1942 an American Corps of engineers extended the 04/22 runway by a further 2,000 ft (610 m). A weather station was also added by the American Government, likely as part of the Alaska Highway effort.

On May 28, 29 of 1949 the Peace River Airport hosted to one of the first airshows in the region. The Air Cadets of the region played host to the R.C.A.F., who brought with them a helicopter, two Harvard trainers, an Avro Anson, and a Beech Expeditor out of which two parachutists jumped.

In June 1960 the Peace River Airport closed in order to complete extensive construction. The runway was paved and an air terminal was built. Peace River Airport re-opened its runway for major airline service in January 1961. The official opening was held August 9, 1961. This date marked the signing of a long term lease (40 years) between the Department of Transport and the Town of Peace River whereby the Town, with subsidization from Transport Canada, would operate the airport.

During 1964 the first Flight Service Specialists were hired to staff the radio at the Peace River Airport. Prior to this, the pilots spoke to the radio operated by the Weather Office at the airport. Even before the Weather Office, the agents of Pacific Western Airlines and Canadian Pacific Airlines had a radio in their homes which they used to communicate with the pilots. PWA did build a small radio shack for their agent.

A new terminal building was opened September 8, 1984. The estimated cost of construction being 4.5 million Heritage Fund dollars.

The Town of Peace River purchased the airport from Transport Canada in 1996 following the National Airports Policy.

== Contemporary issues ==
Peace Regional Airport was sold to the Peace River Regional Airport Association Ltd. in December 2020. The association agreed to continue to provide fire suppression services and financial support of $1.4 million over the first two years of ownership. It is indicated that the air terminal building will be decommissioned.

The Peace River Airport Steering Committee has been set up to assess viability and regionalization potential of the airport. The committee has representatives from The Town of Peace River, Northern Sunrise County, Municipal District of Peace No. 135, County of Northern Lights and the Town of Grimshaw, and is working on a business plan.

The 5,000 ft (1,500 m) long runway 04/22 would be able to accommodate a Boeing 737-600, 737-700 and 737-800 equipped with a short-field design package. Any further extensions to the runway, to enable handling larger aircraft, would have to contend with either Strong Creek's ravine to the west or Highway 2 on the opposite side of the runway. A tributary of St. Germaine Creek cuts a ravine just to the east of the airport.
