= René-Antoine Pelletier =

Canadian politician

Member of Parliament for Peace River
- In office October 1935 – March 1940
- Preceded by: Donald MacBeth Kennedy
- Succeeded by: John Sissons

Personal details
- Born: 2 September 1908 Saint-Faustin, Quebec, Canada
- Died: 30 March 1993 (aged 84) Vancouver, British Columbia, Canada
- Party: Social Credit
- Spouse: Helen Marion Gregory
- Children: Rene (c. 1930), Donald (c. 1931)
- Profession: station agent

René-Antoine Pelletier (2 September 1908 – 30 March 1993) was a station agent and a Canadian federal political politician.

== Political career ==
Pelletier was first elected to the House of Commons of Canada in the 1935 Canadian federal election. He ran as a Social Credit candidate defeated incumbent Member of Parliament Donald MacBeth Kennedy. He served 1 term in office before defeated in the 1940 Canadian federal election by Liberal candidate John Sissons. Pelletier ran in that election as a candidate for the New Democracy party.

He died in 1993 and was buried at Our Lady of Good Hope Roman Catholic, Hope Cemetery.
