= Albert Cooper (Canadian politician) =

Canadian politician

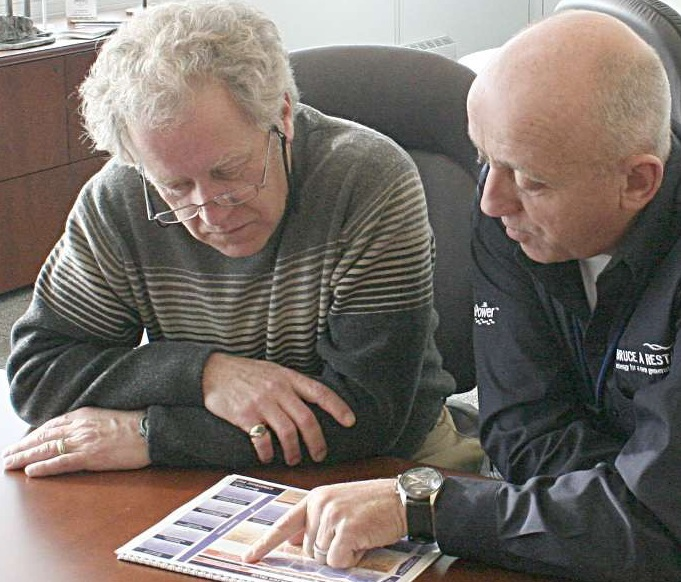
- Albert Cooper (left) in 2008

Member of the Canadian Parliament for Peace River
- In office 1980–1993
- Preceded by: Ged Baldwin
- Succeeded by: Charlie Penson

Personal details
- Born: Albert Glen Cooper; 19 July 1952 (age 73) Berwyn, Alberta, Canada
- Party: Progressive Conservative Party of Canada
- Occupation: businessman

Albert Glen Cooper (born 19 June 1952) is a former Canadian politician who served as the Member of Parliament for the riding of Peace River from 1980 to 1993.

A member of the Progressive Conservative Party, Cooper was first elected to the House of Commons of Canada in the 1980 Canadian federal election. He was re-elected there in 1984 and 1988. He did not seek another term in office after serving in the 32nd, 33rd and 34th Parliaments.

Cooper is a businessperson by career. He owned and ran the now defunct Peace Air until its assets were seized by creditors, and he is now the owner of a bus line offering service from Peace River to Edmonton. He was also hired to be the local spokesperson for Bruce Power until 2011 when the corporation put their plans to build a nuclear plant near Peace River Alberta on hold in face of local opposition.

Cooper was featured in the 2011 Canadian documentary film Peace Out where he discussed Bruce Power's proposed nuclear reactor.
