= Brownlee ministry =

Cabinet of Alberta, 1925–1934

Brownlee Ministry
- 5th ministry of Alberta

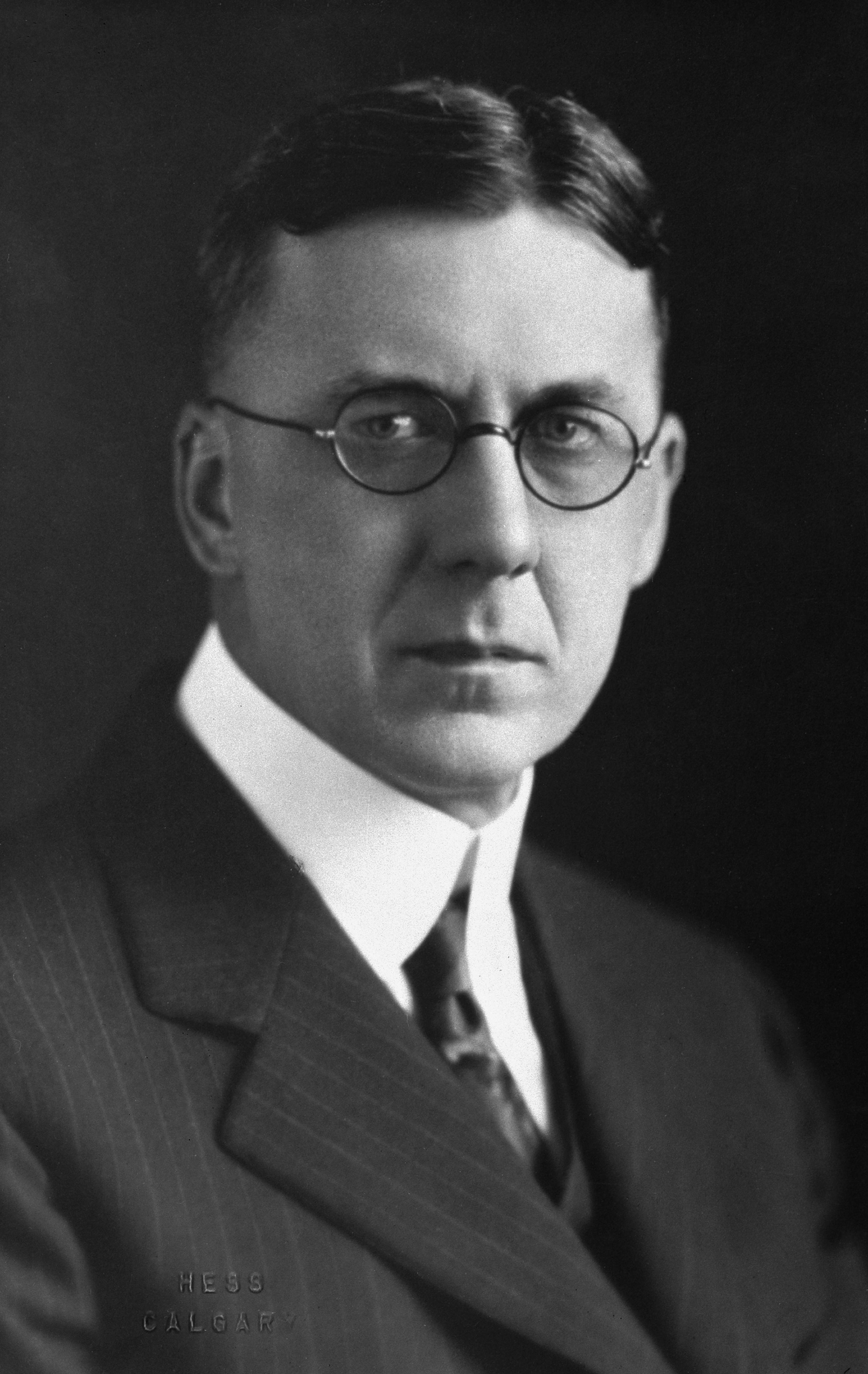
- John Edward Brownlee
- Date formed: November 5, 1925
- Date dissolved: July 10, 1934

People and organisations
- Monarch: George V
- Lieutenant Governor: William Egbert; William L. Walsh
- Premier: John Edward Brownlee
- Premier's history: Premiership of John Edward Brownlee
- Member party: United Farmers of Alberta
- Status in legislature: Majority

History
- Elections: 1926, 1930
- Legislature terms: 5th Alberta Legislature; 6th Alberta Legislature; 7th Alberta Legislature
- Incoming formation: Greenfield's resignation
- Outgoing formation: Brownlee's resignation
- Predecessor: Greenfield Ministry
- Successor: Reid Ministry

The Brownlee Ministry was the combined Cabinet (called Executive Council of Alberta), chaired by Premier John Edward Brownlee, and Ministers that governed Alberta from part way through the 5th Alberta Legislature from November 23, 1925, to part way through the 7th Alberta Legislature on July 10, 1934.

The Executive Council (commonly known as the cabinet) was made up of members of the United Farmers of Alberta which held a majority of seats in the Legislative Assembly of Alberta. The cabinet was appointed by the Lieutenant Governor of Alberta on the advice of the Premier.

== List of ministers ==
Name		Date Appointed	Date Departed
John Edward Brownlee	President of the Executive Council (Premier)	November 23, 1925	July 10, 1934
Richard Gavin Reid	Provincial Treasurer	November 3, 1923	July 9, 1934
George Hoadley	Provincial Secretary	November 23, 1925	June 4, 1926
John Edward Brownlee	Provincial Secretary	July 29, 1926	July 9, 1934
John Edward Brownlee	Attorney General	August 13, 1921	June 4, 1926
John Lymburn	Attorney General	June 5, 1926	July 9, 1934
Perren Baker	Minister of Education	August 13, 1921	September 2, 1935
George Hoadley	Minister of Public Health	November 3, 1923	September 2, 1935
Richard Gavin Reid	Minister of Municipal Affairs	November 23, 1925	July 9, 1934
George Hoadley	Minister of Agriculture	August 13, 1921	June 1, 1934
Frank Grisdale	Minister of Agriculture	June 2, 1934	September 2, 1935
Richard Gavin Reid	Minister of Lands and Mines	October 2, 1930	July 9, 1934
Alex Ross	Minister of Public Works	August 13, 1921	December 30, 1926
Oran McPherson	Minister of Public Works	December 31, 1926	July 9, 1934
Vernor Smith	Minister of Railways and Telephones	August 13, 1921	July 19, 1932
George Hoadley	Minister of Railways and Telephones	June 2, 1934	July 9, 1934
Irene Parlby	Minister Without Portfolio	August 13, 1921	August 21, 1935

== See also ==
- Executive Council of Alberta
- List of Alberta provincial ministers
