= Charlie Penson =

Canadian politician

Member of the Canadian Parliament for Peace River
- In office 1993–2006
- Preceded by: Albert Cooper
- Succeeded by: Chris Warkentin

Personal details
- Born: Charles Frederick Penson; December 1, 1942 (age 83) Grande Prairie, Alberta, Canada
- Party: Conservative Party of Canada
- Occupation: farmer

Charles Frederick Penson (born December 1, 1942) is a former Canadian politician. Penson was a member of the Conservative Party of Canada in the House of Commons of Canada, representing the riding of Peace River from 1993 to 2005. He has also been a member of the Canadian Alliance (2000–2003) and the Reform Party of Canada (1993–2000). Penson is a former farmer and grain grower. During his time in the House, Penson served as official opposition critic of International Trade and also of Industry and Finance.

Penson was born in Grande Prairie, Alberta.
