= Chris Warkentin =

Canadian politician (born 1978)

Chris Warkentin MP
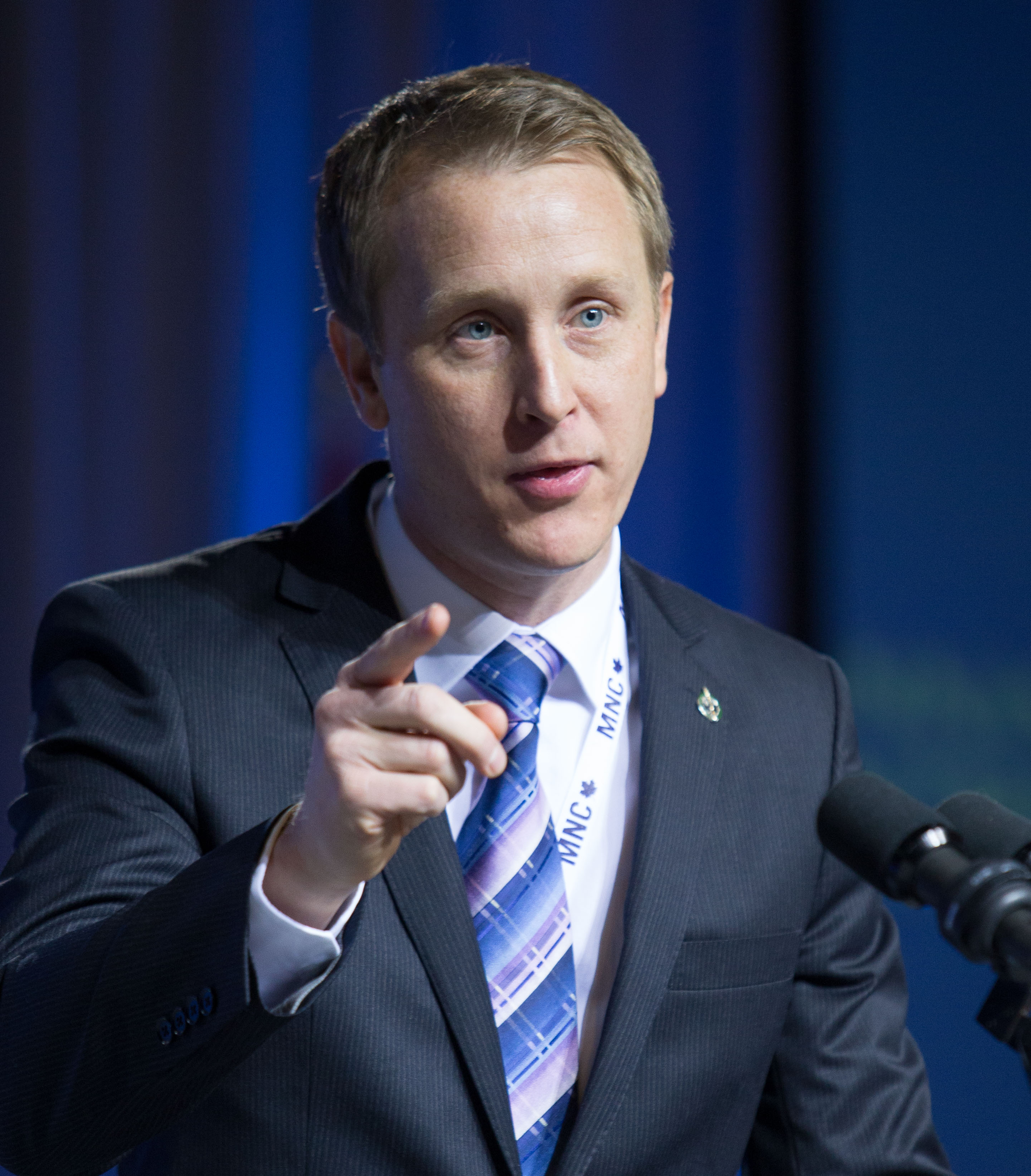
- Warkentin in 2014

Chief Opposition Whip
- Incumbent
- Assumed office May 7, 2025
- Leader: Pierre Poilievre
- Preceded by: Kerry-Lynne Findlay

Member of Parliament for Grande Prairie Grande Prairie-Mackenzie (2015–2025) Peace River (2006-2015)
- Incumbent
- Assumed office January 23, 2006
- Preceded by: Charlie Penson

Deputy Chief Opposition Whip Conservative Party Question Period Coordinator
- In office September 13, 2022 – May 7, 2025
- Chief whip: Kerry-Lynne Findlay
- Preceded by: Eric Duncan (As QP Coordinator); James Bezan (As Deputy Whip)

Official Opposition Critic for Agriculture
- In office November 20, 2015 – September 14, 2016
- Leader: Rona Ambrose
- Preceded by: Malcolm Allen
- Succeeded by: David Anderson

Chair of the Standing Committee on Aboriginal Affairs
- In office June 23, 2011 – February 18, 2015
- Minister: John Duncan; Bernard Valcourt
- Preceded by: Bruce Stanton
- Succeeded by: Blake Richards

Personal details
- Born: November 20, 1978 (age 47) Grande Prairie, Alberta, Canada
- Party: Conservative
- Spouse: Michelle Warkentin
- Profession: construction executive

Christopher Warkentin MP (born November 20, 1978) is a Canadian businessman and politician. He has served as Member of Parliament (MP) for the riding of Grande Prairie since his victory in the 2006 federal election.

== Personal life ==
Warkentin was born in Grande Prairie and raised on the family farm east of Grande Prairie, near the Hamlet of DeBolt in the MD of Greenview. He is an alumnus of the Peace River Bible Institute, and also studied business and marketing at Grande Prairie Regional College before going on to own and operate a custom home building company. He has served on the board of his local Conservative constituency association and was involved with the Reform Party of Canada and the Canadian Alliance.

== Political career ==
Warkentin was elected to the House of Commons of Canada as a Conservative Party of Canada candidate in the riding of Peace River in the 2006 federal election, and was re-elected in that same riding in 2008 and 2011. Following the redistribution of seats before the 2015 federal election, he was re-elected and currently serves as the Member of Parliament for the new riding of Grande Prairie-Mackenzie. Warkentin has won every election he has contested with more than 56% of the vote, and a margin of more than 36 percentage points over the runner-up.

Warkentin served as the Chair of the Aboriginal Affairs and Northern Development Committee from 2011 to 2015. In February 2015, Warkentin was appointed Parliamentary Secretary to the Minister of Public Works and Government Services Canada, Diane Finley. Following the defeat of the Conservative government in October 2015, Warkentin was appointed Official Opposition Critic for Agriculture. In September 2016, a shadow cabinet shuffle moved Warkentin to the role of Official Opposition Deputy House Leader.

== Electoral record ==
2025 Canadian federal election: Grande Prairie
Party	Candidate	Votes	%	±%	Expenditures
Conservative	Chris Warkentin	47,904	81.68	+12.72	$41,502.41
Liberal	Maureen Mcleod	6,946	11.84	+7.62	$3,346.19
New Democratic	Jennifer Villebrun	2,460	4.19	–7.66	$2,452.72
People's	Shawn McLean	828	1.41	–8.79	$6,195.77
Rhinoceros	Donovan Eckstrom	291	0.50	–0.10	none listed
Independent	Elliot McDavid	223	0.38	–	none listed
Total valid votes/expense limit		58,652	99.41	–	$160,454.51
Total rejected ballots		348	0.59	+0.00	
Turnout		59,000	69.44	+6.06	
Eligible voters		84,961			
Conservative hold		Swing			
Source: Elections Canada

2021 Canadian federal election: Grande Prairie—Mackenzie
Party	Candidate	Votes	%	±%	Expenditures
Conservative	Chris Warkentin	36,361	68.43	–15.54	$43,536.04
New Democratic	Jennifer Villebrun	6,462	12.16	+5.20	$841.79
People's	Shawn McLean	5,411	10.18	+7.74	$15,893.10
Liberal	Dan Campbell	2,397	4.51	–0.26	$2,223.58
Maverick	Ambrose Ralph	2,195	4.13	–	$24,544.01
Rhinoceros	Donovan Eckstrom	314	0.59	–	none listed
Total valid votes/expense limit		53,140	99.41	–	$140,613.53
Total rejected ballots		315	0.59	+0.08	
Turnout		53,455	63.38	–7.29	
Eligible voters		84,343			
Conservative hold		Swing		–10.37	
Source: Elections Canada

2019 Canadian federal election: Grande Prairie—Mackenzie
Party	Candidate	Votes	%	±%	Expenditures
Conservative	Chris Warkentin	51,198	83.96	+11.05	$39,732.27
New Democratic	Erin Alyward	4,245	6.96	–1.18	$1,284.64
Liberal	Kenneth Munro	2,910	4.77	–9.89	$1,675.64
People's	Douglas Gordon Burchill	1,492	2.45	–	$4,216.22
Green	Shelley Termuende	1,134	1.86	–1.28	none listed
Total valid votes/expense limit		60,979	99.49	–	$138,396.48
Total rejected ballots		314	0.51	+0.21	
Turnout		61,293	70.67	+5.95	
Eligible voters		86,736			
Conservative hold		Swing		+6.12	
Source: Elections Canada

2015 Canadian federal election: Grande Prairie—Mackenzie
Party	Candidate	Votes	%	±%	Expenditures
Conservative	Chris Warkentin	38,895	72.92	–3.21	$47,450.74
Liberal	Reagan Johnston	7,819	14.66	+11.48	$7,280.10
New Democratic	Saba Mossagizi	4,343	8.14	–7.26	$13,165.14
Green	James David Friesen	1,673	3.14	–0.62	$2,768.22
Libertarian	Dylan Thompson	613	1.15	–	$120.00
Total valid votes/expense limit		53,343	99.70	–	$269,305.37
Total rejected ballots		158	0.30	–	
Turnout		53,501	64.72	–	
Eligible voters		82,665			
Conservative hold		Swing		–7.34	
Source: Elections Canada

2011 Canadian federal election: Peace River
Party	Candidate	Votes	%	±%	Expenditures
Conservative	Chris Warkentin	36,334	75.76	+6.24	$46,666.18
New Democratic	Jennifer Villebrun	7,740	16.14	+1.73	$17,743.20
Green	Wayne John Kamieniecki	1,702	3.55	–4.22	$1,264.14
Liberal	Corina Ganton	1,481	3.09	–3.60	$4,872.25
Independent	Russ Toews	359	0.75	–	$203.93
Rhinoceros	Donovan Eckstrom	345	0.72	–	none listed
Total valid votes/expense limit		47,961	99.73	–	$123,491.94
Total rejected ballots		128	0.27	–0.03	
Turnout		48,089	49.00	+4.76	
Eligible voters		98,135			
Conservative hold		Swing		+3.99	
Source: Elections Canada

2008 Canadian federal election: Peace River
Party	Candidate	Votes	%	±%	Expenditures
Conservative	Chris Warkentin	29,550	69.52	+12.54	$47,891.22
New Democratic	Adele Boucher Rymhs	6,124	14.41	+3.28	$18,963.61
Green	Jennifer Villebrun	3,303	7.77	+5.51	$1,611.56
Liberal	Liliane Maisonneuve	2,843	6.69	–2.69	$7,607.24
Canadian Action	Edwin Siggelkow	373	0.88	–	$4,711.06
Libertarian	Mélanie Simard	316	0.74	–	$1,313.62
Total valid votes/expense limit		42,509	99.70	–	$118,949.24
Total rejected ballots		129	0.30	+0.07	
Turnout		42,638	44.24	–10.49	
Eligible voters		96,378			
Conservative hold		Swing		+4.63	
Source: Elections Canada

2006 Canadian federal election: Peace River
Party	Candidate	Votes	%	±%	Expenditures
Conservative	Chris Warkentin	27,785	56.97	–8.16	$63,836.70
Independent	Bill Given	9,882	20.26	–	$99,770.88
New Democratic	Susan Thompson	5,427	11.13	+0.02	$20,084.33
Liberal	Tanya Kappo	4,573	9.38	–9.59	$6,598.04
Green	Zane Lewis	1,102	2.26	–2.54	none listed
Total valid votes/expense limit		48,769	99.77	–	$106,290.48
Total rejected ballots		113	0.23	–0.06	
Turnout		48,882	54.73	+1.00	
Eligible voters		89,318			
Conservative hold		Swing		–14.21	
Source: Elections Canada
