= Ged Baldwin =

Canadian politician

Ged Baldwin OC
- Official portrait, 1973

Opposition House Leader
- In office August 14, 1974 – February 24, 1976
- Leader: Robert Stanfield
- Preceded by: Thomas Miller Bell
- Succeeded by: Walter Baker
- In office July 27, 1968 – September 20, 1973
- Leader: Robert Stanfield
- Preceded by: Michael Starr
- Succeeded by: Thomas Miller Bell

Parliamentary Secretary to the Prime Minister of Canada
- In office August 17, 1962 – February 6, 1963 Serving with Théogène Ricard
- Prime Minister: John Diefenbaker
- Preceded by: John Pallett
- Succeeded by: Alexis Caron; Jack Davis

Member of Parliament for Peace River
- In office. March 31, 1958 – February 18, 1980
- Preceded by: Solon Earl Low
- Succeeded by: Albert Cooper

Personal details
- Born: Gerald William Baldwin; January 18, 1907 Palmerston, New Zealand
- Died: December 16, 1991 (aged 84) Ottawa, Ontario, Canada
- Party: Progressive Conservative
- Spouse: Beulah Grace Freeland (m. 1930)
- Relatives: Chrystia Freeland (great-niece)
- Occupation: Lawyer

Gerald William "Ged" Baldwin OC (January 18, 1907 – December 16, 1991) was a Canadian politician who served as the member of Parliament (MP) for the riding of Peace River from 1958 to 1980. He was known as the "Father and Grandfather" of the Access to Information Act.

== Life and career ==
Born in Palmerston, New Zealand, Baldwin was educated in Edmonton, Alberta and became a lawyer. He stood unsuccessfully for the Legislative Assembly of Alberta in the 1935 general election, as the Conservative candidate in the riding of Peace River. During World War II, he served with the Canadian Army in Britain and Europe.

He first ran for the House of Commons in 1957, as a Progressive Conservative in the riding of Peace River against Solon E. Low, the leader of the Social Credit Party of Canada. He was defeated, but ran against Low again in the 1958 election and was successful. From 1962 to 1963, he was the Parliamentary Secretary to John Diefenbaker, the Prime Minister of Canada. From 1968 to 1973 and again from 1974 to 1976, under Robert Stanfield, he was the Official Opposition House Leader and Progressive Conservative House Leader. He retired from Parliament in 1980.

In 1982, he received an honorary Doctor of Law degree from the University of Alberta. In 1985, he was made an Officer of the Order of Canada. The citation for his investiture reads in part: "His efforts have stimulated many others to take up the cause [of freedom of information], thus encouraging governments in many jurisdictions across Canada to adopt similar legislation." He published his autobiography, Frontier Justice, in 1987.

Baldwin's wife, Beulah, is the sister of Wilbur Freeland, paternal grandfather of former Liberal MP and cabinet minister Chrystia Freeland. Beulah's background is recounted in her book The Long Trail - The Story of a Pioneer Family (NeWest Press).
