= Greenfield ministry =

Cabinet of Alberta, 1921–1925

Greenfield Ministry
- 4th ministry of Alberta

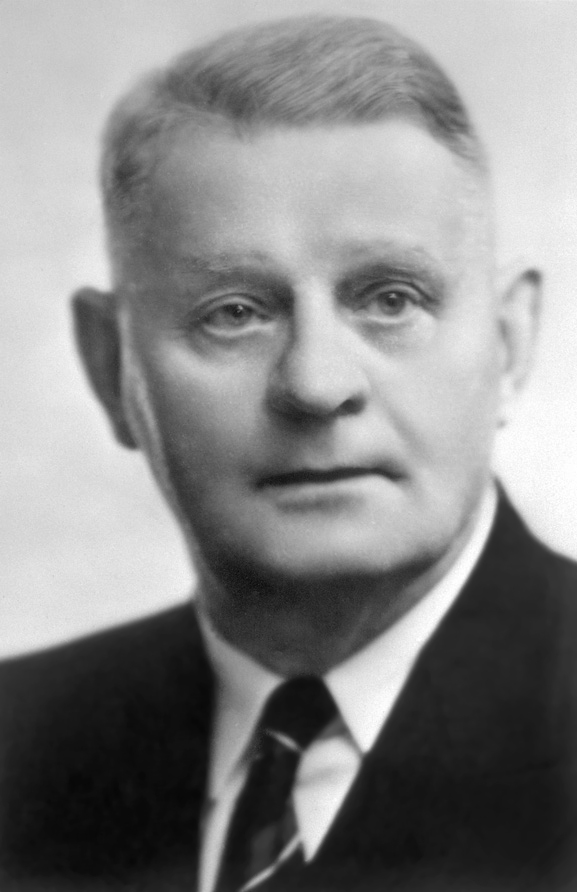
- Herbert Greenfield
- Date formed: August 13, 1921
- Date dissolved: November 23, 1925

People and organisations
- Monarch: George V
- Lieutenant Governor: Robert Brett; William Egbert
- Premier: Herbert Greenfield
- Member party: United Farmers of Alberta
- Status in legislature: Majority

History
- Legislature term: 5th Alberta Legislature
- Predecessor: Stewart Ministry
- Successor: Brownlee Ministry

The Greenfield Ministry was the combined Cabinet (called Executive Council of Alberta), chaired by Premier Herbert Greenfield, and Ministers that governed Alberta during the 5th Alberta Legislature from August 13, 1921, to November 23, 1925.

The Executive Council (commonly known as the cabinet) was made up of members of the United Farmers of Alberta which held a majority of seats in the Legislative Assembly of Alberta. The cabinet was appointed by the Lieutenant Governor of Alberta on the advice of the Premier.

== List of ministers ==
Name		Date Appointed	Date Departed
Herbert Greenfield	President of the Executive Council (Premier)	August 13, 1921	November 23, 1925
Herbert Greenfield	Provincial Treasurer	August 13, 1921	November 2, 1923
Richard Gavin Reid	Provincial Treasurer	November 3, 1923	July 9, 1934
Herbert Greenfield	Provincial Secretary	August 13, 1921	November 2, 1923
John Edward Brownlee	Provincial Secretary	November 3, 1923	November 22, 1925
John Edward Brownlee	Attorney General	August 13, 1921	June 4, 1926
Perren Baker	Minister of Education	August 13, 1921	September 2, 1935
Richard Gavin Reid	Minister of Public Health	August 13, 1921	November 2, 1923
George Hoadley	Minister of Public Health	November 3, 1923	September 2, 1935
Richard Gavin Reid	Minister of Municipal Affairs	August 13, 1921	November 2, 1923
Herbert Greenfield	Minister of Municipal Affairs	November 3, 1923	November 22, 1925
George Hoadley	Minister of Agriculture	August 13, 1921	June 1, 1934
Alex Ross	Minister of Public Works	August 13, 1921	December 30, 1926
Vernor Smith	Minister of Railways and Telephones	August 13, 1921	July 19, 1932
Irene Parlby	Minister Without Portfolio	August 13, 1921	August 21, 1935

== See also ==
- Executive Council of Alberta
- List of Alberta provincial ministers
