= Donald MacBeth Kennedy =

Canadian politician

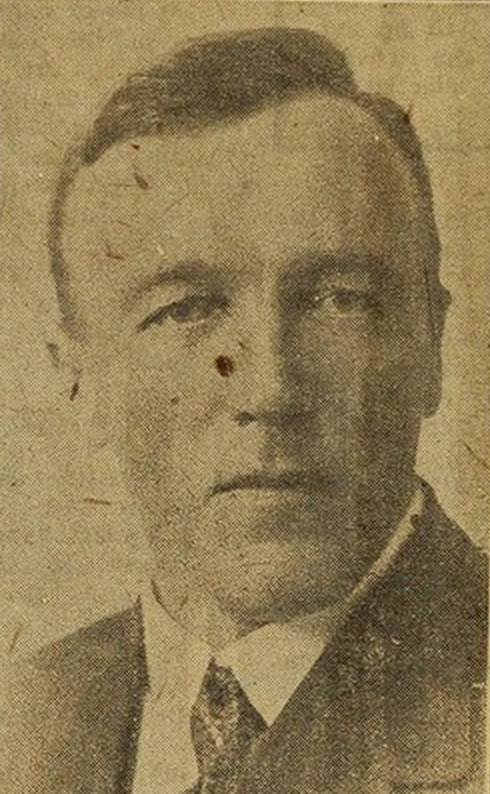

Member of Parliament
- In office 1921–1925
- Preceded by: William Antrobus Griesbach
- Succeeded by: Charles Stewart
- Constituency: Edmonton West
- In office 1925–1935
- Succeeded by: René-Antoine Pelletier
- Constituency: Peace River

Member of the Legislative Assembly of Alberta
- In office 1921
- Preceded by: William Archibald Rae
- Succeeded by: Herbert Greenfield
- Constituency: Edmonton West

Personal details
- Born: August 21, 1884 Ballinluig, Perthshire, Scotland
- Died: September 25, 1957 (aged 73) Alberta, Canada
- Party: United Farmers of Alberta
- Occupation: farmer

Donald MacBeth Kennedy (August 21, 1884 – September 25, 1957) was a Canadian farmer as well as a provincial and federal level Canadian politician representing Albertans. He was a UFA MLA 1921-1922 and a Progressive/UFA MP 1921–1935.

== Biography ==
Kennedy was born in Scotland in 1884, and came to Canada in 1903. He spent time in British Columbia and Manitoba, and then returned to Scotland. Kennedy returned to Canada to farm in the Peace River area of Alberta, and homesteaded in 1911 in Waterhole, Alberta. In 1916, he married Mable M. Macdonald, and they had three daughters. Kennedy died in 1957.

== Political career ==
Kennedy ran for the United Farmers of Alberta in the 1921 Alberta general election. He defeated Liberal incumbent William Rae in a landslide. Kennedy resigned his seat to provide a seat for Herbert Greenfield who had been named premier of the United Farmers government. Kennedy ran for a seat in the House of Commons of Canada in the 1921 Canadian federal election held months later in the federal electoral district of Edmonton West as a candidate for the Progressive Party of Canada; he defeated former Liberal Member of Parliament Frank Oliver and former Conservative MLA Robert Campbell to win his first term in office.

Kennedy switched to the new Peace River district in the 1925 Canadian federal election. He ran against William Rae, whom he had previously defeated, and Conservative candidate James Arthur Collins. The race ended in a near three-way tie with Kennedy coming out on top; the spread between first and third was 42 votes.

A year later he ran again in the 1926 Canadian federal election this time under the United Farmers of Alberta banner. He defeated Mayor of Edmonton Joseph Clarke and James Arthur Collins again by a much larger margin than the election a year ago.

Kennedy ran for a fourth term in the House of Commons in the 1930 Canadian federal election. He defeated Liberal candidate John Ewing Thompson by a comfortable margin. He was defeated in his bid for a fifth term in office in 1935, this time running under the Co-operative Commonwealth banner, finishing third among four candidates to Social Credit Party of Canada candidate René-Antoine Pelletier.

In parliament, Kennedy joined the Ginger Group of radical MPs in the 1920s.
