= Henry Wise Wood =

Canadian activist and lobbyist

Henry Wise Wood CMG
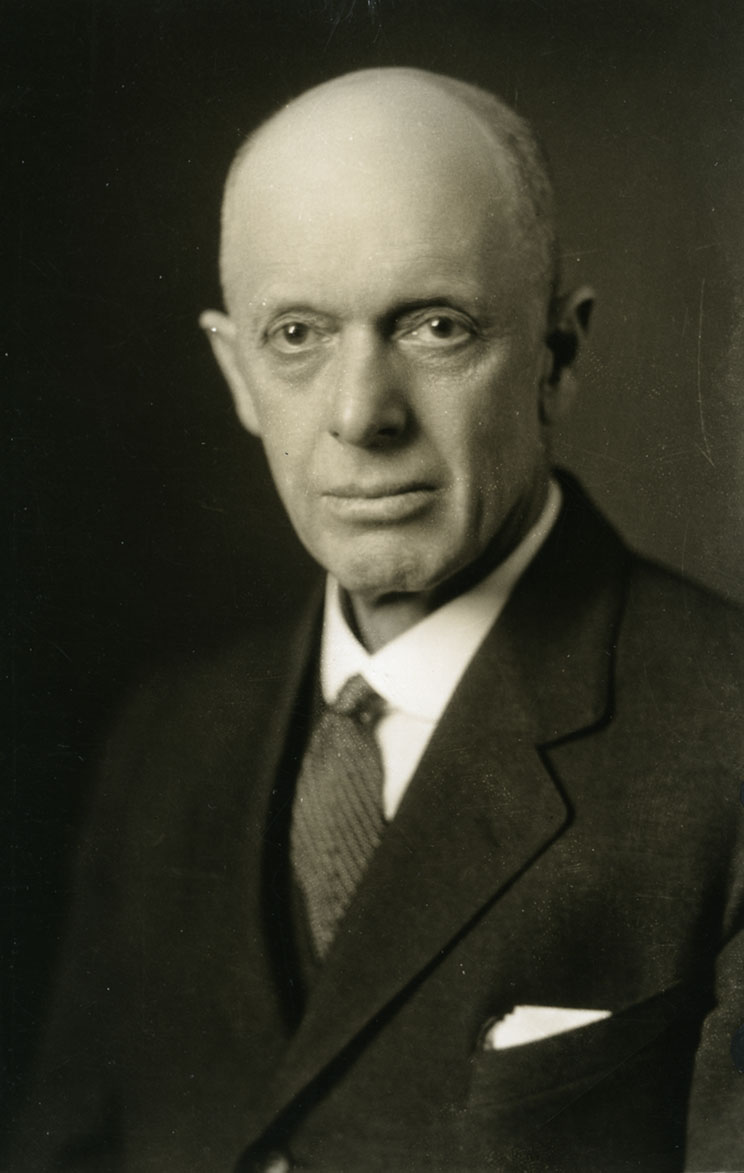
- Portrait of Henry Wise Wood
- Born: May 31, 1860; Ralls County, Missouri, United States
- Died: June 10, 1941 (aged 81); Carstairs, Alberta, Canada
- Citizenship: Canadian
- Known for: Agrarian theorist
- Title: President
- Term: 1916–1931
- Movement: United Farmers of Alberta

Henry Wise Wood (May 31, 1860 – June 10, 1941) was an American-born Canadian agrarian thinker and activist. He became director in 1914 and was elected president of the United Farmers of Alberta in 1916. Under his leadership the UFA became the most powerful political lobby group in the province. In 1919, Wood oversaw the transition of the UFA into a political party and in 1921 they formed the government of Alberta, winning 38 of 61 seats in the Legislative Assembly. Wood refused to enter electoral politics himself but led the UFA's extra-parliamentary organization throughout, and influenced the elected government from the sidelines.

== Background and early career ==
Wood was born on a farm near Monroe City, Missouri, United States, to a prosperous farming family with land holding in Missouri and Texas. He became an accomplished stockman while still a teenager. At the age of 44 he visited Alberta and the following year (1905) purchased a wheat farm and moved his family to Carstairs, Alberta.

== Leadership of United Farmers of Alberta ==
An earnest student of agrarian reform, he had observed the Alliance and Populist movements in Missouri during the 1890s and after relocating to Canada soon joined the Society for Equity, an early farm association. In 1909 the Society for Equity merged with the Alberta Farmers' Association to form the United Farmers of Alberta. In 1914 Wood became a director of the UFA; in 1915 he was elected vice-president and was president from 1916 to 1931.

=== Class conflict ideology ===
Wood became well known as the main theorist and head of the radical Albertan branch of the wave of agrarian discontent that was sweeping Canada at the time. He consistently refused to run for office. After initial opposition due to past experience with will-fated political farm organizations in the U.S., he backed the United Farmers when they began to engage in direct politics—running for office—and also supported the Progressive Party of Canada and UFA candidates federally. Wood's basic ideology was one of supporting farmers' class interests against bankers and industrialists and hope for birth of cooperative society. He put forward new idea of representative government —the concept of "group government"—in which a legislature proportionally representing each sector of the society would replace the existing parliamentary system where political parties represent narrow class interests.

== Later life ==
Appointed a Companion of the Order of St Michael and St George in 1935, Wood continued to play an important role in the UFA until 1937 when he retired to his farm in Carstairs, Alberta.

He died in 1941. A school in Calgary, Henry Wise Wood High School, was named after him.
