= 7th Alberta Legislature =

Canadian Legislative Assembly

- Majority parliament
- Jan. 29, 1931 – Jul. 22, 1935

Parliament leaders
- Premier: John Edward Brownlee; November 23, 1925 – July 10, 1934
- Richard Gavin Reid; July 10, 1934 – September 3, 1935
- Cabinets: Brownlee cabinet Reid cabinet

Party caucuses
- Government: United Farmers of Alberta
- Opposition: Liberal Party
- Crossbench: Dominion Labor Party
- Conservative Party

Legislative Assembly
- Speaker of the Assembly: George Norman Johnston; February 10, 1927 – July 22, 1935
- Members: 63 MLA seats

Sovereign
- Monarch: George V May 6, 1910 – January 20, 1936
- Lieutenant governor: Hon. William Egbert; October 29, 1925 – May 5, 1931
- Hon. William L. Walsh; May 5, 1931 – October 1, 1936

Sessions
- 1st session January 29, 1931 – March 28, 1931
- 2nd session February 4, 1932 – April 6, 1932
- 3rd session February 9, 1933 – April 11, 1933
- 4th session February 8, 1934 – April 16, 1934
- 5th session February 7, 1935 – April 23, 1935
← 6th	→ 8th

The 7th Alberta Legislative Assembly was in session from January 29, 1931, to July 22, 1935, with the membership of the assembly determined by the results of the 1930 Alberta general election held on June 19, 1930. The Legislature officially resumed on January 29, 1931, and continued until the fifth session was prorogued on April 23, 1935 and dissolved on July 22, 1935, prior to the 1935 Alberta general election.

Alberta's sixth government was controlled by the majority United Farmers of Alberta for the third consecutive term, led by Premier John Edward Brownlee, who would later resign and be replaced with Richard Gavin Reid. There was no Official Opposition in Alberta between 1926 and 1941 due to the Independent Movement which saw a majority of non-UFA candidates elected as independents. The Speaker was George Norman Johnston.

== Scandals ==
Premier John Brownlee's personal reputation was destroyed by a sex scandal in which he was successfully sued for the ancient and rarely litigated civil tort of seduction by a young woman in his employ.

In July 1933 Brownlee gave a car ride to Vivian MacMillan, then employed as a clerk in the office of the attorney general. MacMillan's fiancé filed a seduction suit against Brownlee, who denied all charges and launched a countersuit alleging that MacMillan, her father, and her fiancé had planned the entire affair for their own financial gain.

The jury found Brownlee guilty of seduction, but the presiding judge overturned its verdict. Nevertheless, the circumstances were damaging enough that Brownlee resigned from the provincial ministry in July 1934.

Little Bow MLA Oran McPherson also had a high-profile divorce scandal that made big headlines after Cora McPherson took him to court.

The UFA's economic policies as well as the scandalizing of Alberta's conservative population led to the party's downfall in the 1935 election when it failed to win one seat in the legislature. William Aberhart and his Social Credit Party swept the province.

== Bills ==
=== Alberta Provincial Police ===
On February 25, 1932, Justice Minister John F. Lymburn introduced An Act to ratify a certain Agreement between the Government of the Dominion of Canada and the Government of the Province of Alberta for Policing the Province (Bill 42) and An Act to Amend the Provincial Police Act, 1928 (Bill 43) which would wind-down the operations of the Alberta Provincial Police. Bill 42 ratifying the agreement passed on March 7, 1932 by a vote of 50-7, while Bill 43 would be passed two weeks later on March 21, 1932. Finally, on April 1, 1932 the Royal Canadian Mounted Police began policing operations in Alberta.

=== Alberta Health Insurance Act ===
The Alberta Health Insurance Act, passed by the Alberta Legislature in February 1935 was the first legislated health insurance program in Canada to provide some public funding for medical services, and as such is considered to be an early step toward the provision of medicare in Canada.

The legislation proposed to provide health care to the every province resident at an annual cost of CA$14.50 per person. However, the Act was unable to pass before the United Farmers of Alberta was defeated out of office by the Social Credit Party. The plan would require health care providers to provide specific services for the insured at no extra cost. These services included "full-time public health service", "complete medical service" (including major and minor surgery and obstetrics), "drugs and surgical appliances" if prescribed, limited "dental service", "private nursing service" (under special circumstances) and "hospitalization" (x-rays, operating room, lab services, etc.). Although this plan was not enacted, later in the 1940s and 1950s, a national health care system became gradually more prevalent among provinces. Hospital insurance would provide federal funds to provinces that would implement a universal hospital insurance plan. The full implementation of such programs slowly developed and in 1969 Alberta adopted a universal health insurance program.

== Floor crossings ==
A sensational week occurred in the Assembly just prior to the opening of the 4th Legislative Session. Victoria MLA Peter Miskew decided to cross the floor from the United Farmers to the Liberals. The floor crossing did terrific damage to John Brownlee's government as the Premier had announced three days prior that Miskew would be moving the governments reply to the throne speech.

Miskew's reasoned after crossing the floor that moving the reply to the speech from the throne would mean that he would support the government's policies which he no longer believed in. He sent notice by memo to the premier deciding not to inform him in person.

Three days later, St. Albert MLA Omer St. Germain crossed the floor to join Miskew in the Liberal benches. David Duggan, the leader of the Conservatives, applauded Miskew crossing the floor. He stated that it was the beginning of the end for the United Farmers and that the conservative-minded elements in the United Farmers will oppose the radical elements that were allowing the Co-operative Commonwealth Federation to pull the United Farmers to the left.

== Membership in the 7th Alberta Legislature ==
District	Member	Party	First elected/ previously elected	No.# of term(s)
Acadia	Lorne Proudfoot	United Farmers	1921	3rd term
Alexandra	Peter Enzenauer	United Farmers	1921	3rd term
Athabasca	Frank Falconer	Liberal	1930	1st term
Beaver River	Judicial Recount			
Beaver River	Henry Dakin	Liberal	1930	1st term
Bow Valley	John Mackintosh	Independent	1930	1st term
Calgary	Hugh Farthing	Conservative	1930	1st term
Calgary	John J. Bowlen	Liberal	1930	1st term
Calgary	John Irwin	Conservative	1926	2nd term
Calgary	George Harry Webster	Liberal	1926	2nd term
Calgary	Fred White	Dominion Labor	1921	3rd term
Calgary	Harold McGill	Conservative	1930	1st term
Calgary	Norman Hindsley (1933)	Independent	1933	1st term
Calgary	William Ross (1934)	Liberal	1934	1st term
Camrose	Vernor Smith	United Farmers	1921	3rd term
Camrose	Chester Ronning (1932)	United Farmers	1932	1st term
Cardston	George Stringam	United Farmers	1921	3rd term
Clover Bar	Rudolph Hennig	United Farmers	1926	2nd term
Cochrane	Robert Milton McCool	United Farmers	1926	2nd term
Coronation	George Johnston	United Farmers	1921	3rd term
Cypress	Perren Baker	United Farmers	1921	3rd term
Didsbury	Austin Claypool	United Farmers	1921	3rd term
Drumheller	Fred Moyer	Independent	1930	1st term
Edmonton	John Lymburn	United Farmers	1926	2nd term
Edmonton	David Milwyn Duggan	Conservative	1926	2nd term
Edmonton	Charles Gibbs	Dominion Labor	1926	2nd term
Edmonton	William Howson	Liberal	1930	1st term
Edmonton	Charles Weaver	Conservative	1926	2nd term
Edmonton	William Atkinson	Conservative	1930	1st term
Edmonton	Frederick Jamieson (1931)	Conservative	1931	1st term
Edson	Christopher Pattinson	Dominion Labor	1926	2nd term
Empress	William Smith	United Farmers	1921	3rd term
Gleichen	John Buckley	United Farmers	1921	3rd term
Grande Prairie	Hugh Allen	United Farmers	1926	2nd term
Grouard	Leonidas Giroux	Liberal	1924	3rd term
Hand Hills	Gordon Forster	United Farmers	1921	3rd term
Innisfail	Donald Cameron	United Farmers	1921	3rd term
Lac Ste. Anne	Charles McKeen	United Farmers	1921	3rd term
Lacombe	Irene Parlby	United Farmers	1921	3rd term
Leduc	Arthur Percy Mitchell	Liberal	1930	1st term
Lethbridge	Andrew Smeaton	Dominion Labor	1926	2nd term
Little Bow	Oran McPherson	United Farmers	1921	3rd term
Macleod	William Shield	United Farmers	1921	3rd term
Medicine Hat	Hector Lang	Liberal	1928	2nd term
Nanton-Claresholm	Gordon Beverly Walker	United Farmers	1926	2nd term
Okotoks-High River	George Hoadley	United Farmers	1909 (Note: First elected as Conservative)	6th term
Olds	Frank Grisdale	United Farmers	1930	1st term
Peace River	William Bailey	United Farmers	1930	1st term
Pembina	George MacLachlan	United Farmers	1921	3rd term
Pincher Creek	Harvey Bossenberry	Liberal	1930	1st term
Ponoka	John Brownlee	United Farmers	1921	3rd term
Red Deer	George Wilbert Smith	United Farmers	1921	3rd term
Red Deer	William E. Payne (1931)	Conservative	1931	1st term
Ribstone	William Farquharson	United Farmers	1922	3rd term
Rocky Mountain	George Cruickshank	Independent	1930	1st term
Sedgewick	Albert Andrews	United Farmers	1922	3rd term
St. Albert	Omer St. Germain	United Farmers	1930	1st term
St. Albert	Omer St. Germain	Liberal	1930	1st term
St. Paul	Joseph Miville Dechene	Liberal	1921, (Note: Beaver River) 1930	2nd term*
Stettler	Albert Sanders	United Farmers	1921	3rd term
Stony Plain	Donald Macleod	United Farmers	1930	1st term
Sturgeon	Samuel Carson	United Farmers	1921	3rd term
Taber	John MacLellan	United Farmers	1930	1st term
Vegreville	Archie Matheson	United Farmers	1921	3rd term
Vermilion	Richard Reid	United Farmers	1921	3rd term
Victoria	Peter Miskew	United Farmers	1930	1st term
Victoria	Peter Miskew	Liberal	1930	1st term
Wainwright	John Love	United Farmers	1921	3rd term
Warner	Maurice Conner	United Farmers	1921	3rd term
Wetaskiwin	Hugh John Montgomery	Liberal	1914, 1930	3rd term*
Whitford	Isidore Goresky	United Farmers	1930	1st term

== Standings changes since the 7th general election ==
Number of members per party by date	1930			1931			1932			1933		1934		
Number of members per party by date	Jun 19	Aug 21	Oct 1	Jan 9	Aug 1	Nov 16	Jul 19	Oct 25	Oct 14	Jan 19	Nov 10	Jan 15	Feb 3	Feb 6
United Farmers	40	39			38		37	38					37	36
Liberal	10	11									10	11	12	13
Conservative	6		5	6		7			6					
Dominion Labor	4													
Independent	3									4				
Total members	63		62	63	62	63	62	63	62	63	62	63		
Vacant	0		1	0	1	0	1	0	1	0	1	0		
Government Majority	17	15	16	15	14	13	12	13	14	13	14	13	11	9

Membership changes in the 7th Assembly
Date	Name	District	Party	Reason
June 1930	Hugh Allen	Grande Prairie	United Farmers	Acclaimed in the 1926 general election
June 19, 1930	See List of Members			Election day of the 7th Alberta general election
August 21, 1930	John Delisle	Beaver River	United Farmers	Lost seat after election was overturned in judicial recount.
August 21, 1930	Henry Dakin	Beaver River	Liberal	Won seat after election was overturned in judicial recount.
October 1, 1930	Charles Weaver	Edmonton	Conservative	Died of a heart attack
January 9, 1931	Frederick Jamieson	Edmonton	Conservative	Elected in a by-election
August 1, 1931	George Smith	Red Deer	United Farmers	Died from a heart seizure
November 16, 1931	William Payne	Red Deer	Conservative	Elected in a by-election
July 19, 1932	Vernor Smith	Camrose	United Farmers	Died from angina pectoris.
October 25, 1932	Chester Ronning	Camrose	United Farmers	Elected in a by-election
October 14, 1932	Harold McGill	Calgary	Conservative	Appointed Superintendent-General of Indian Affairs.
January 19, 1933	Norman Hindsley	Calgary	Independent	Elected in a by-election
November 10, 1933	George Webster	Calgary	Liberal	Died
January 15, 1934	William Ross	Calgary	Liberal	Elected in a by-election
February 3, 1934	Peter Miskew	Victoria	Liberal	Crossed the floor from the United Farmers caucus
February 6, 1934	Omer St. Germain	St. Albert	Liberal	Crossed the floor from the United Farmers caucus

== Bibliography ==
- Fryer, Harold (1977). Alberta, the pioneer years. Langley, British Columbia: Stagecoach Publishing Co. Ltd. OCLC 651982480.
- Legislative Assembly of Alberta (1932). "7th Legislative Assembly, 2nd Session". Journals of the Legislative Assembly of Alberta. XXIX.
