= Francis A. Walker (politician) =

Canadian politician

Francis Austin Walker
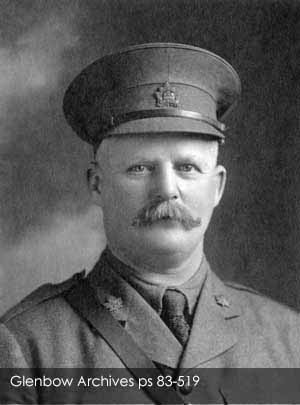
- Walker in military uniform in 1918

Member of the Legislative Assembly of Alberta
- In office November 9, 1905 – July 18, 1921
- Preceded by: Jack Shera (in Victoria)
- Succeeded by: William Fedun
- Constituency: Victoria

Personal details
- Born: November 17, 1871 Lucan, Ontario
- Died: May 29, 1956 (aged 84) Vancouver, British Columbia
- Party: Liberal

Francis Austin Walker (November 17, 1871 – May 29, 1956) was a Canadian politician who served as a member of the Legislative Assembly of Alberta from 1905 until 1921. Born in Lucan, Ontario, on November 17, 1871, he moved west to Alberta, becoming a pioneer in the area east of Edmonton.

In the 1905 provincial election, Alberta's first as a province, Walker ran as the Liberal candidate in the district of Victoria. He was elected by a wide margin to the 1st Alberta Legislature over his opponent Jack Shera who had previously represented the district in the Legislative Assembly of the Northwest Territories. He was re-elected by acclamation in the 1909 election, and was easily re-elected in the 1913 election. Prior to the 1917 election, the legislature passed an act re-electing all of its members serving in the First World War; as Walker was at this time a lieutenant in the Canadian Expeditionary Force, he was thus "re-elected" without need of an election.

In the 1921 Alberta general election Walker was defeated by William Fedun of United Farmers of Alberta. In that election the Liberal party was swept from power. Walker contested the Victoria seat once again in the 1926 Alberta general election, but was defeated by United Farmers candidate Rudolph Hennig.

Walker eventually moved to British Columbia and he attempted a comeback in politics running for the British Columbia Liberal Party in the 1941 British Columbia general election in North Vancouver.
