= William Thomas Lucas =

Canadian politician (1875–1973)

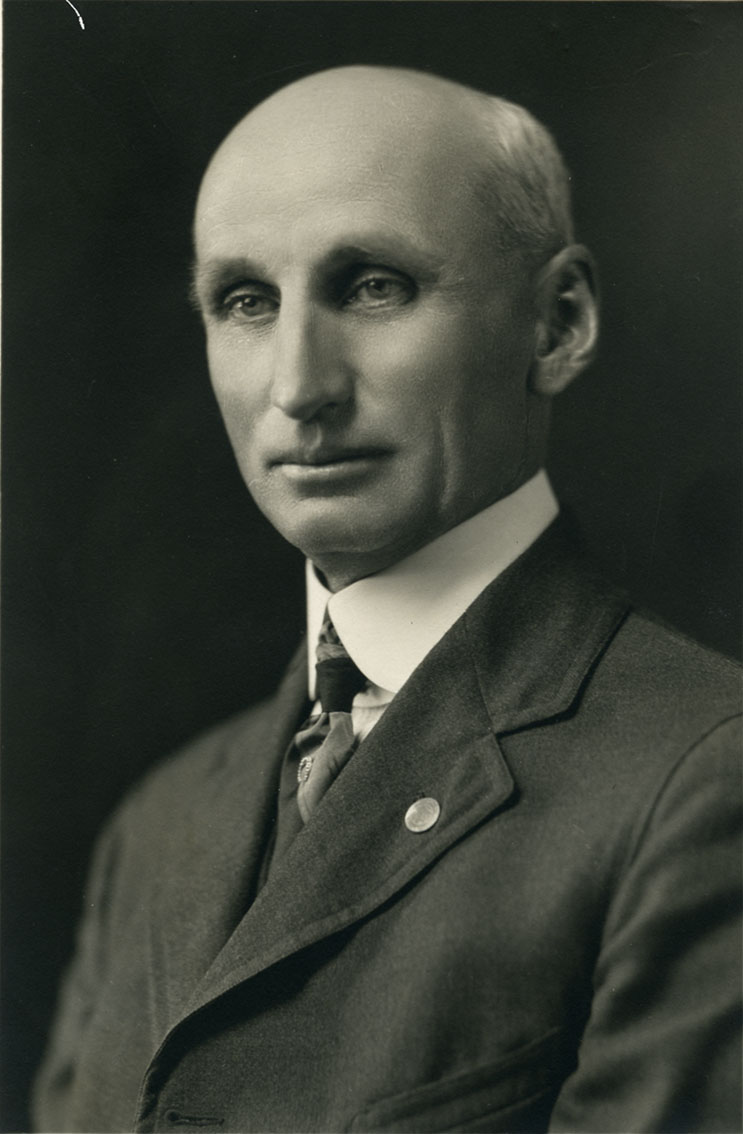

Member of Parliament for Camrose (1925–1935) for Victoria (1921–1925)
- In office 1921–1935
- Preceded by: William Henry White
- Succeeded by: James Alexander Marshall

Personal details
- Born: July 26, 1875 Bailieboro, Ontario, Canada
- Died: March 27, 1973 (aged 97) Peterborough, Ontario, Canada
- Party: United Farmers of Alberta; Conservative
- Spouse: Charlotte Perrin (m. 1903)
- Children: Jack; Ruth; Margaret
- Profession: Farmer

William Thomas Lucas (1875–1973) was a Canadian farmer and a federal politician from Alberta. He served as MP for the Victoria riding (in Alberta) from 1921 to 1925 and for the Camrose riding from 1925 to 1935.

He was born in Bailieboro, Ontario, on July 26, 1875, to John William and Margaret (née Fair) Lucas, both of Irish descent. He attended public schooling in the Bailieboro area as well as the Ontario Agricultural College. On 9 January 1903, Lucas married Charlotte "Lottie" Perrin, of Bailieboro. With her he had three children. His religion was listed as Anglican.

Lucas was elected to the House of Commons of Canada in the 1921 Canadian federal election as a United Farmers of Alberta candidate in the riding of Victoria. He defeated former Alberta MLA James Bismark Holden in a landslide by receiving more than 80 percent of the vote.

The electoral district was abolished due to redistribution, and he was re-elected in the new Camrose riding in the 1925 Canadian federal election. The minority government of Arthur Meighen fell a year later. Lucas won a third term in the 1926 Canadian federal election by defeating Liberal candidate Donald McIvor. McIvor and Lucas faced each other again in the 1930 Canadian federal election. Lucas was re-elected again and increased his margin of victory over McIvor.

In 1932, the other eight United Farmers of Alberta MPs joined the newly founded Co-operative Commonwealth Federation and ran as CCF candidates in the 1935 Canadian federal election. Lucas did not join the CCF and ran in 1935 as a Conservative. The 1935 election was a Social Credit wave, and Lucas finished third behind Social Credit candidate James Alexander Marshall and former Liberal MLA George Smith.

During his terms in office, he resided at Lougheed, Alberta, where he farmed.

When his son, John W. (Jack), died in January 1960, William T. Lucas and Charlotte Perrin, his parents were listed as survivors.

William Thomas Lucas died March 27, 1973, in Peterborough.

== Electoral history ==
1921 Canadian federal election
Party	Candidate	Votes
United Farmers of Alberta	William Thomas Lucas	11,402
Liberal	CONNOLLY, Christopher Fraser	1,780
Conservative	James Bismark Holden	907

1925 Canadian federal election
Party	Candidate	Votes
United Farmers of Alberta	William Thomas Lucas	4,202
Liberal	THOMAS, John Wilson	1,885
Conservative	SCOTT, Albert	1,409

1926 Canadian federal election
Party	Candidate	Votes
United Farmers of Alberta	William Thomas Lucas	5,100
Liberal	MCIVOR, Donald Randolph	3,490

1930 Canadian federal election
Party	Candidate	Votes
United Farmers of Alberta	William Thomas Lucas	6,462
Liberal	MCIVOR, Donald Randolph	4,432

1935 Canadian federal election
Party	Candidate	Votes
Social Credit	James Alexander Marshall	8,776
Liberal	George P. Smith	2,438
Conservative	William Thomas Lucas	2,051
