= Peter Miskew =

Canadian politician and lawyer

Peter A. Miskew
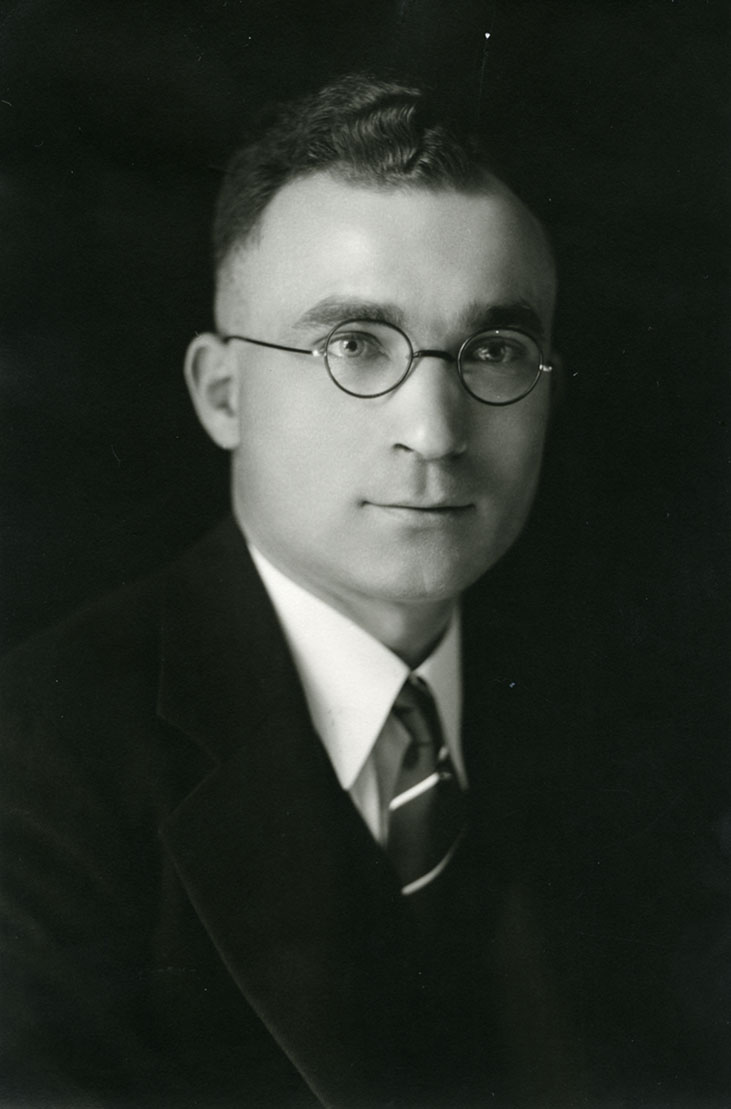

Member of the Legislative Assembly of Alberta
- In office June 19, 1930 – August 22, 1935
- Preceded by: Rudolph Hennig
- Succeeded by: Samuel Calvert
- Constituency: Victoria

Personal details
- Born: 27 November 1899 Biliavtsi, Eastern Galicia, Austria-Hungary
- Died: 9 September 1965 (aged 65) Edmonton, Alberta, Canada
- Party: Liberal; United Farmers
- Occupation: politician and lawyer

Peter Alexander Miskew (27 November 1899 – 9 September 1965) was a politician and lawyer from Alberta, Canada. He served as a member of the Legislative Assembly of Alberta from 1930 to 1935 sitting with the United Farmers caucus in government and also with the Liberal caucus in opposition.

== Political career ==
Miskew ran for a seat to the Alberta Legislature in the Victoria Alberta electoral district in the 1930 Alberta general election as a candidate under the United Farmers banner. Miskew held the riding for the United Farmers of Alberta in a hotly contested election. He won the three-way race by a plurality of 66 votes over Liberal candidate S.W. Bahlay.

Miskew crossed the floor to the Liberal caucus on February 3, 1934, three days after Premier John Brownlee announced Miskew would move the speech from the throne in the 4th Session of the 7th Alberta Legislative Assembly. Miskew informed the Premier of his decision to cross by a memo and stated that he did not support the policies of the United Farmers government any longer.

Miskew achieved his law degree graduating the University of Alberta on May 10, 1935, as part of a class of 20 senior law students. Miskew's tenure as an MLA caused the university to clarify its ban on campus political clubs. President Robert Wallace had originally stated that no student should ally with a political party. He was later forced to clarify that he meant in regards to the ban on political clubs when asked about Miskew and a Social Credit candidate who had attended the university.

Miskew retired from provincial politics at dissolution of the Assembly in 1935.
