= Vermilion (provincial electoral district) =

Defunct provincial electoral district in Alberta, Canada

Coordinates: 53.4°N 110.8°W

Alberta electoral district

Defunct provincial electoral district
- Legislature: Legislative Assembly of Alberta
- District created: 1905
- District abolished: 1971
- First contested: 1905
- Last contested: 1967

Vermilion was a provincial electoral district in Alberta, Canada, mandated to return a single member to the Legislative Assembly of Alberta from 1905 to 1971.

== History ==
Members of the Legislative Assembly for Vermilion
Assembly	Years	Member	Party
1st	1905–1906	Matthew McCauley (politician)	Liberal
1st	1906–1909	James Bismark Holden	Liberal
2nd	1909–1910	Archibald Campbell	Liberal
2nd	1910–1913	Arthur Lewis Sifton	Liberal
3rd	1913–1917	Arthur Lewis Sifton	Liberal
4th	1917–1917	Arthur Lewis Sifton	Liberal
4th	1917–1921	Arthur W. Ebbett	Liberal
5th	1921–1926	Richard Gavin Reid	United Farmers
6th	1926–1930	Richard Gavin Reid	United Farmers
7th	1930–1935	Richard Gavin Reid	United Farmers
8th	1935–1940	William A. Fallow	Social Credit
9th	1940–1944	William A. Fallow	Social Credit
10th	1944–1948	William R. Cornish	Social Credit
11th	1948–1952	William R. Cornish	Social Credit
12th	1952–1955	William R. Cornish	Social Credit
13th	1955–1959	Russell J. Whitson	Liberal
14th	1959–1963	Ashley Cooper	Social Credit
15th	1963–1967	Ashley Cooper	Social Credit
16th	1967–1971	Ashley Cooper	Social Credit
See Vermilion-Viking electoral district from 1971-1993

Vermilion was one of the original 25 electoral districts contested in the 1905 Alberta general election upon Alberta joining Confederation in September 1905. In the 1970 electoral district re-distribution, the Vermilion electoral district would be abolished and would be reformed as Vermilion-Viking, the boundaries for the new district would be a continuation of the Vermilion boundaries as adjusted prior to the 1963 Alberta general election.

=== Members of the Legislative Assembly (MLAs) ===
Matthew McCauley was elected as the first member for the Vermilion district, he had previously served as the first Mayor of Edmonton and member of the Legislative Assembly of the North-West Territories for the Edmonton electoral district. McCauley's time in the Alberta Legislature was limited to less than a year when he resigned his seat in 1906 after his appointment to be Warden of the Edmonton Penitentiary, the first of its kind in Alberta.

== Election results ==
=== 1905 ===
The returning officer for the 1905 election was Thomas J. Cunningham.

1905 Alberta general election
Party	Candidate	Votes	%	±%
Liberal	Matthew McCauley	673	73.07%	–
Conservative	Frank Fane	248	26.93%	–
Total		921	–	–
Rejected, spoiled and declined		N/A	–	–
Eligible electors / turnout		921	N/A	–
Liberal pickup new district.				
Source(s) Source: "Vermilion Official Results 1905 Alberta general election". Alberta Heritage Community Foundation.

=== 1906 by-election ===
Alberta provincial by-election, July 16, 1906 Upon Matthew McCauley's appointment as warden of Edmonton Penitentiary
Party	Candidate	Votes	%	±%
Liberal	James Bismark Holden	Acclaimed	–	–
Total		N/A	–	–
Rejected, spoiled and declined		N/A	–	–
Eligible electors / turnout		N/A	N/A	–
Liberal hold		Swing		–
Source(s) "By-elections". Elections Alberta.

=== 1909 ===
1909 Alberta general election
Party	Candidate	Votes	%	±%
Liberal	Archibald Campbell	919	66.55%	-6.53%
Conservative	Rev. Albert Richard Aldridge	462	33.45%	6.53%
Total		1,381	–	–
Rejected, spoiled and declined		N/A	–	–
Eligible electors / turnout		N/A	N/A	–
Liberal hold		Swing		-6.53%
Source(s) Source: "Vermilion Official Results 1909 Alberta general election". Alberta Heritage Community Foundation.

=== 1910 by-election ===
Alberta provincial by-election, June 29, 1910 Upon Archibald Campbell's resignation to provide a seat for the new Premier on June 8, 1910
Party	Candidate	Votes	%	±%
Liberal	Arthur Lewis Sifton	1,018	58.91%	–
Conservative	J. George Clark	710	41.09%	–
Total		1,728	–	–
Rejected, spoiled and declined		N/A	–	–
Eligible electors / turnout		N/A	N/A	–
Liberal hold		Swing		N/A
Source(s) "Past By-Election results". Elections Alberta. Mardon, p. 129

=== 1913 ===
1913 Alberta general election
Party	Candidate	Votes	%	±%
Liberal	Arthur Lewis Sifton	772	47.68%	-18.86%
Conservative	J. George Clark	571	35.27%	1.81%
Independent	Gregory Krikevsky	276	17.05%	–
Total		1,619	–	–
Rejected, spoiled and declined		N/A	–	–
Eligible electors / turnout		N/A	N/A	–
Liberal hold		Swing		-10.34%
Source(s) Source: "Vermilion Official Results 1913 Alberta general election". Alberta Heritage Community Foundation.

=== 1917 ===
1917 Alberta general election
Party	Candidate	Votes	%	±%
Liberal	Arthur Lewis Sifton	2,063	63.03%	15.35%
Conservative	John B. Burch	1,210	36.97%	1.70%
Total		3,273	–	–
Rejected, spoiled and declined		N/A	–	–
Eligible electors / turnout		N/A	N/A	–
Liberal hold		Swing		6.82%
Source(s) Source: "Vermilion Official Results 1917 Alberta general election". Alberta Heritage Community Foundation.

=== 1917 by-election ===
Alberta provincial by-election, November 19, 1917 Upon the resignation of Arthur Lewis Sifton on October 12, 1917
Party	Candidate	Votes	%	±%
Liberal	Arthur W. Ebbett	Acclaimed	–	–
Total		N/A	–	–
Rejected, spoiled and declined		N/A	–	–
Eligible electors / turnout		N/A	N/A	–
Liberal hold		Swing		N/A
Source(s) "Past By-Election results". Elections Alberta.

=== 1921 ===
1921 Alberta general election
Party	Candidate	Votes	%	±%
United Farmers	Richard Gavin Reid	2,955	75.89%	–
Liberal	Arthur W. Ebbett	939	24.11%	-38.92%
Total		3,894	–	–
Rejected, spoiled and declined		N/A	–	–
Eligible electors / turnout		N/A	N/A	–
United Farmers gain from Liberal		Swing		12.86%
Source(s) Source: "Vermilion Official Results 1921 Alberta general election". Alberta Heritage Community Foundation.

=== 1921 by-election ===
Alberta provincial by-election, December 9, 1921 Ministerial by-election upon Richard Gavin Reid being appointed to Cabinet
Party	Candidate	Votes	%	±%
United Farmers	Richard Gavin Reid	Acclaimed	–	–
Total		N/A	–	–
Rejected, spoiled and declined		N/A	–	–
Eligible electors / turnout		N/A	N/A	–
United Farmers hold		Swing		N/A
Source(s) "Past By-Election results". Elections Alberta.

=== 1926 ===
1926 Alberta general election
Party	Candidate	Votes	%	±%
United Farmers	Richard Gavin Reid	1,981	64.63%	-11.25%
Conservative	W. J. MacNab	592	19.31%	–
Liberal	Arthur W. Ebbett	492	16.05%	-8.06%
Total		3,065	–	–
Rejected, spoiled and declined		232	–	–
Eligible electors / turnout		4,886	67.48%	–
United Farmers hold		Swing		-3.23%
Source(s) Source: "Vermilion Official Results 1926 Alberta general election". Alberta Heritage Community Foundation.

=== 1930 ===
1930 Alberta general election
Party	Candidate	Votes	%	±%
United Farmers	Richard Gavin Reid	2,551	75.79%	11.15%
Liberal	Robert B. Hall	815	24.21%	8.16%
Total		3,366	–	–
Rejected, spoiled and declined		139	–	–
Eligible electors / turnout		5,624	62.32%	-5.16%
United Farmers hold		Swing		3.13%
Source(s) Source: "Vermilion Official Results 1930 Alberta general election". Alberta Heritage Community Foundation.

=== 1935 ===
1935 Alberta general election
Party	Candidate	Votes 1st count	%	Votes final count	±%
Social Credit	William A. Fallow	2,452	44.81%	2,664	–
Liberal	Arthur P. Hunter	1,062	19.41%	1,437	-4.80%
United Farmers	Richard Gavin Reid	876	16.01%	–	-59.78%
Communist	William Halina	838	15.31%	–	–
Conservative	Albert E. Williams	244	4.46%	–	–
Total		5,472	–	–	–
Rejected, spoiled and declined		172	–	–	–
Eligible electors / turnout		6,816	82.81%	20.48%	–
Social Credit gain from United Farmers		Swing		-13.09%	
Source(s) Source: "Vermilion Official Results 1935 Alberta general election". Alberta Heritage Community Foundation. Mardon 130 Instant-runoff voting requires a candidate to receive a plurality (greater than 50%) of the votes. As no candidate received a plurality of votes, the bottom candidate was eliminated and their 2nd place votes were applied to both other candidates until one received a plurality.

=== 1940 ===
1940 Alberta general election
Party	Candidate	Votes 1st count	%	Votes final count	±%
Social Credit	William A. Fallow	2,203	44.47%	2,506	-0.34%
Independent	S. C. Heckbert	1,815	36.64%	2,148	–
Co-operative Commonwealth	J. T. McDuffe	936	18.89%	–	–
Total		4,954	–	–	–
Rejected, spoiled and declined		179	–	–	–
Eligible electors / turnout		6,721	76.37%	-6.43%	–
Social Credit hold		Swing		-8.78%	
Source(s) Source: "Vermilion Official Results 1940 Alberta general election". Alberta Heritage Community Foundation. Instant-runoff voting requires a candidate to receive a plurality (greater than 50%) of the votes. As no candidate received a plurality of votes, the bottom candidate was eliminated and their 2nd place votes were applied to both other candidates until one received a plurality.

=== 1944 ===
1944 Alberta general election
Party	Candidate	Votes	%	±%
Social Credit	William R. Cornish	2,239	52.94%	8.47%
Labor-Progressive	William M. Teresio	999	23.62%	–
Co-operative Commonwealth	L. E. Larcombe	991	23.43%	4.54%
Total		4,229	–	–
Rejected, spoiled and declined		40	–	–
Eligible electors / turnout		6,260	68.19%	-8.18%
Social Credit hold		Swing		10.74%
Source(s) Source: "Vermilion Official Results 1944 Alberta general election". Alberta Heritage Community Foundation.

=== 1948 ===
1948 Alberta general election
Party	Candidate	Votes 1st count	%	Votes final count	±%
Social Credit	William R. Cornish	1,999	46.10%	2,196	-6.84%
Liberal	William H. Chorney	1,179	27.19%	1,323	–
Co-operative Commonwealth	Roy William Hay	1,158	26.71%	3.27%	–
Total		4,336	–	–	–
Rejected, spoiled and declined		245	–	–	–
Eligible electors / turnout		6,372	71.89%	3.70%	–
Social Credit hold		Swing		-5.20%	
Source(s) Source: "Vermilion Official Results 1948 Alberta general election". Alberta Heritage Community Foundation. Instant-runoff voting requires a candidate to receive a plurality (greater than 50%) of the votes. As no candidate received a plurality of votes, the bottom candidate was eliminated and their 2nd place votes were applied to both other candidates until one received a plurality.

=== 1952 ===
1952 Alberta general election
Party	Candidate	Votes 1st count	%	Votes final count	±%
Social Credit	William R. Cornish	1,955	48.70%	2,058	2.60%
Liberal	George Kravetz	835	20.80%	983	-6.39%
Farmer	John P. Hocaluk	655	16.32%	713	–
Co-operative Commonwealth	Edwin Barber	569	14.18%	–	-12.53%
Total		4,014	–	–	–
Rejected, spoiled and declined		249	–	–	–
Eligible electors / turnout		6,432	66.28%	-5.61%	–
Social Credit hold		Swing		4.50%	
Source(s) Source: "Vermilion Official Results 1952 Alberta general election". Alberta Heritage Community Foundation. Instant-runoff voting requires a candidate to receive a plurality (greater than 50%) of the votes. As no candidate received a plurality of votes, the bottom candidate was eliminated and their 2nd place votes were applied to both other candidates until one received a plurality.

=== 1955 ===
1955 Alberta general election
Party	Candidate	Votes 1st count	%	Votes final count	±%
Liberal	Russell J. Whitson	1,728	36.48%	2,131	15.68%
Social Credit	Ashley Cooper	2,018	42.60%	2,111	-6.10%
Co-operative Commonwealth	M. Meronyk	684	14.44%	–	0.26%
Labor-Progressive	John P. Hocaluk	307	6.48%	–	–
Total		4,737	–	–	–
Rejected, spoiled and declined		310	–	–	–
Eligible electors / turnout		6,692	75.42%	9.14%	–
Liberal gain from Social Credit		Swing		-10.89%	
Source(s) Source: "Vermilion Official Results 1955 Alberta general election". Alberta Heritage Community Foundation. Instant-runoff voting requires a candidate to receive a plurality (greater than 50%) of the votes. As no candidate received a plurality of votes, the bottom candidate was eliminated and their 2nd place votes were applied to both other candidates until one received a plurality.

=== 1959 ===
1959 Alberta general election
Party	Candidate	Votes	%	±%
Social Credit	Ashley Cooper	2,204	49.48%	6.88%
Liberal	Russell J. Whitson	1,224	27.48%	-9.00%
Progressive Conservative	D. J. Frunchak	799	17.94%	–
Labor-Progressive	John P. Hocaluk	227	5.10%	-1.38%
Total		4,454	–	–
Rejected, spoiled and declined		12	–	–
Eligible electors / turnout		6,162	72.48%	-2.94%
Social Credit gain from Liberal		Swing		7.94%
Source(s) Source: "Vermilion Official Results 1959 Alberta general election". Alberta Heritage Community Foundation.

=== 1963 ===
1963 Alberta general election
Party	Candidate	Votes	%	±%
Social Credit	Ashley Cooper	2,964	68.20%	18.72%
Liberal	Arthur W. Roland	837	19.26%	-8.22%
New Democratic	Edward Thompson	545	12.54%	–
Total		4,346	–	–
Rejected, spoiled and declined		8	–	–
Eligible electors / turnout		6,605	65.92%	-6.56%
Social Credit hold		Swing		13.47%
Source(s) Source: "Vermilion Official Results 1963 Alberta general election". Alberta Heritage Community Foundation.

=== 1967 ===
1967 Alberta general election
Party	Candidate	Votes	%	±%
Social Credit	Ashley Cooper	2,545	58.03%	-10.18%
Progressive Conservative	Hilda Wilson	1,199	27.34%	–
New Democratic	Harry E. Yaremchuk	642	14.64%	2.10%
Total		4,386	–	–
Rejected, spoiled and declined		17	–	–
Eligible electors / turnout		6,398	68.82%	2.90%
Social Credit hold		Swing		-9.13%
Source(s) Source: "Vermilion Official Results 1967 Alberta general election". Alberta Heritage Community Foundation.

== Plebiscite results ==
=== 1957 liquor plebiscite ===
1957 Alberta liquor plebiscite results: Vermilion
Question A: Do you approve additional types of outlets for the sale of beer, wine and spirituous liquor subject to a local vote?
Ballot choice	Votes	%
Yes	1,258	53.92%
No	1,075	46.08%
Total votes	2,333	100%
Rejected, spoiled and declined	15	
5,758 eligible electors, turnout 40.79%

On October 30, 1957, a stand-alone plebiscite was held province wide in all 50 of the then current provincial electoral districts in Alberta. The government decided to consult Alberta voters to decide on liquor sales and mixed drinking after a divisive debate in the Legislature. The plebiscite was intended to deal with the growing demand for reforming antiquated liquor control laws.

The plebiscite was conducted in two parts. Question A asked in all districts, asked the voters if the sale of liquor should be expanded in Alberta, while Question B asked in a handful of districts within the corporate limits of Calgary and Edmonton asked if men and woman were allowed to drink together in establishments.

Province wide Question A of the plebiscite passed in 33 of the 50 districts while Question B passed in all five districts. Vermilion voted in favour of the proposal with a slight majority. Voter turnout in the district was very low, falling well under the province-wide average of 46%.

Official district returns were released to the public on December 31, 1957. The Social Credit government in power at the time did not considered the results binding. However the results of the vote led the government to repeal all existing liquor legislation and introduce an entirely new Liquor Act.

Municipal districts lying inside electoral districts that voted against the Plebiscite were designated Local Option Zones by the Alberta Liquor Control Board and considered effective dry zones, business owners that wanted a licence had to petition for a binding municipal plebiscite in order to be granted a licence.

== See also ==
- List of Alberta provincial electoral districts
- Canadian provincial electoral districts
- Vermilion, a town in central Alberta
