= Arthur Ebbett =

Canadian politician

Arthur Wellesley Ebbett

Member of the Legislative Assembly of Alberta
- In office June 7, 1917 – July 18, 1921
- Preceded by: Arthur Sifton
- Succeeded by: Richard Reid
- Constituency: Vermilion

Personal details
- Born: January 3, 1866
- Died: April 2, 1929 (aged 63)
- Party: Liberal
- Occupation: lawyer and politician

Arthur Wellesley Ebbett (January 3, 1866 – April 2, 1929) was a lawyer and a provincial politician from Alberta, Canada. He served as a member of the Legislative Assembly of Alberta from 1917 to 1921 sitting with the Liberal caucus in government.

== Political career ==
Ebbett ran for a seat to the Alberta Legislature in a by-election that was to be held on November 19, 1917, as the Liberal candidate in the Vermilion electoral district following the resignation of the Premier Arthur Lewis Sifton on October 12, 1917. He was nominated to run under the party banner at a convention held on November 2, 1917. He was acclaimed on nomination day held November 15, 1917, when no other candidates came forward.

Ebbett ran for a second term in office in the 1921 Alberta general election. He was defeated in a landslide by United Farmers candidate Richard Reid.
