= Victoria (Alberta provincial electoral district) =

Defunct provincial electoral district in Alberta, Canada

Coordinates: 54.47°N 111.82°W

Alberta electoral district

Defunct provincial electoral district
- Legislature: Legislative Assembly of Alberta
- District created: 1905
- District abolished: 1940
- First contested: 1905
- Last contested: 1935

Victoria was one of the original 25 provincial electoral districts in Alberta, Canada, named for Fort Victoria on the North Saskatchewan River. It was mandated to return a single member to the Legislative Assembly of Alberta by the first past the post method until 1917, and by instant-runoff voting from 1926 until it was abolished in 1940.

== History ==
Members of the Legislative Assembly for Victoria
Assembly	Years	Member	Party
See Victoria (N.W.T.) 1894-1905
1st	1905–1909	Francis Walker	Liberal
2nd	1909–1913	Francis Walker	Liberal
3rd	1913–1917	Francis Walker	Liberal
4th	1917–1921	Francis Walker	Liberal
5th	1921–1926	William Fedun	United Farmers
6th	1926–1930	Rudolph Hennig	United Farmers
7th	1930	Peter Miskew	United Farmers
7th	1930–1935	Peter Miskew	Liberal
8th	1935–1940	Samuel Calvert	Social Credit
See Willingdon and Vegreville 1940-1959

=== Boundary history ===
The Victoria electoral district was one of the original 25 electoral districts contested in the 1905 Alberta general election upon Alberta joining Confederation in September 1905. The district was carried over from the old Victoria electoral district which returned a single member to the Legislative Assembly of the North-West Territories from 1894 to 1905. The old electoral district had covered the part of the District of Alberta directly north and east of Edmonton. The new province moved Victoria's boundary further east to the Fourth Meridian, to reflect the change in Alberta's shape, while the northwest part of Victoria became the new district of Sturgeon.

Jack Shera the incumbent from the North-West Territories Legislature who was first elected in 1898 Northwl-West Territories general election was defeated in the 1905 general election by Liberal Francis A. Walker.

In 1909, the area north of the North Saskatchewan River was split off to create the Pakan district, named for the town at Fort Victoria. This greatly reduced Victoria's size and moved its namesake outside of its boundaries. It covered approximately the same area as the present-day Lamont County, along with Fort Saskatchewan.

Victoria disappeared in 1940 when it was merged with Whitford to create Willingdon.

=== Representation history ===
Victoria's first MLA was Francis A. Walker, defeating incumbent N.W.T. MLA Jack Shera. He served as a backbencher with the Liberal government for all four terms it was in power. In 1917, he was returned to the Legislature by acclamation because the province declared all active servicemen in World War I re-elected.

However, in 1921 William Fedun, a Ukrainian immigrant, narrowly defeated Walker to capture Victoria for the upstart United Farmers of Alberta, which formed government after the election. He chose to retire after one term.

UFA candidate Rudolph Hennig again narrowly won Victoria in 1926 on the second count, despite another strong challenge from Walker. He served one term but did not win the UFA nomination in the next election.

1930 saw the closest election yet in Victoria, with UFA candidate Peter Miskew defeating his Liberal opponent by less than 100 votes. However, Miskew would almost immediately cross the floor to the Liberal opposition.

When the United Farmers were swept out of power in 1935, Social Credit candidate Samuel Calvert, another WWI veteran, easily captured Victoria for his party. After his first term, Victoria was abolished in time for the 1940 election, and Calvert chose to retire from politics.

== Election results ==
=== 1900s ===
1905 Alberta general election
Party	Candidate	Votes	%
Liberal	Francis A. Walker	949	69.88
Conservative	John William Shera	409	30.12
Total valid votes		1,358	
Liberal pickup new district.			
Source(s) "Results for Victoria". Heritage Community Foundation. Archived from the original on December 8, 2010.

The returning officer for the 1905 election in Victoria was Albert Ernest Archer.

In 1909, no candidates stood against Francis Walker, and he was declared acclaimed.

1909 Alberta general election
Party	Candidate	Votes	%	±%
Liberal	Francis A. Walker (acclaimed)	—	—	—
Total valid votes		—		
Rejected, spoiled and declined		—		
Registered electors / Turnout		—	—	—
Liberal hold		Swing		—

=== 1910s ===
1913 Alberta general election
Party	Candidate	Votes	%	±%
Liberal	Francis A. Walker	773	62.49%	-7.39%
Conservative	R.A. Bennett	268	21.67%	-8.45%
Independent	M. Gowda	196	15.84%	
Total valid votes		1,237		
Rejected, spoiled and declined		—		
Registered electors / Turnout		1,664	74.34%	—
Liberal hold		Swing		+0.53%

1913 swing is calculated from the 1905 election.

In 1917, because Walker was an active serviceman in World War I, he was automatically re-elected by acclamation for a second time.

1917 Alberta general election
Party	Candidate	Votes	%	±%
Liberal	Francis A. Walker (acclaimed)	—	—	—
Total valid votes		—		
Rejected, spoiled and declined		—		
Registered electors / Turnout		—	—	—
Liberal hold		Swing		—

=== 1920s ===
1921 Alberta general election
Party	Candidate	Votes	%	±%
United Farmers	William Fedun	1,401	52.10%	
Liberal	Francis A. Walker	1,288	47.90%	-14.59%
Total valid votes		2,689		
Rejected, spoiled and declined		—		
Registered electors / Turnout		2,983	90.14%	+15.80%
United Farmers gain from Liberal		Swing		+33.35%

1921 swing is calculated from the 1913 election.

For the 1926 election, the UFA government introduced alternative vote in rural constituencies. Since no candidate won a majority in the first round, second preferences were included.

1926 Alberta general election
Party	Candidate	Votes	%	±%
United Farmers	Rudolph Hennig	1,404	45.33%	-6.77%
Liberal	Francis A. Walker	1,185	38.26%	-9.64%
Independent Liberal	William Pylypow	322	10.40%	
Independent Farmer	G.H. Moisey	96	3.10%	
Conservative	William Pullishij	90	2.91%	
Final count
United Farmers	Rudolph Hennig	1,476	54.28%	+8.95%
Liberal	Francis A. Walker	1,243	45.72%	+7.46%
No preference		378		
Total valid votes		3,097		
Rejected, spoiled and declined		143		
Registered electors / Turnout		4,691	69.07%	-21.07%
United Farmers hold		Swing		+1.44%

Final count swing represents vote share increase from the initial count. Overall swing is calculated from the initial count.

=== 1930s ===
1930 Alberta general election
Party	Candidate	Votes	%	±%
United Farmers	Peter Miskew	1,588	50.30%	+4.97%
Liberal	S.W. Bahlay	1,522	48.21%	+9.95%
Independent	E. Olendy	47	1.49%	
Total valid votes		3,157		
Rejected, spoiled and declined		176		
Registered electors / Turnout		4,326	77.05%	+7.98%
United Farmers hold		Swing		-2.49%

1935 Alberta general election
Party	Candidate	Votes	%	±%
Social Credit	Samuel Calvert	2,045	55.48%	
Liberal	C.F. Connolly	1,181	32.04%	-16.17%
United Farmers	Fred Strashok	319	8.65%	-41.65%
Conservative	V. Kupchenko	141	3.83%	
Total valid votes		3,686		
Rejected, spoiled and declined		110		
Registered electors / Turnout		4,878	77.81%	+0.76%
Social Credit gain from Liberal		Swing		+35.83%

== See also ==
- List of Alberta provincial electoral districts
- Canadian provincial electoral districts
