= Reid ministry (Alberta) =

Cabinet of Alberta, 1934–1935

Reid Ministry
- 6th ministry of Alberta

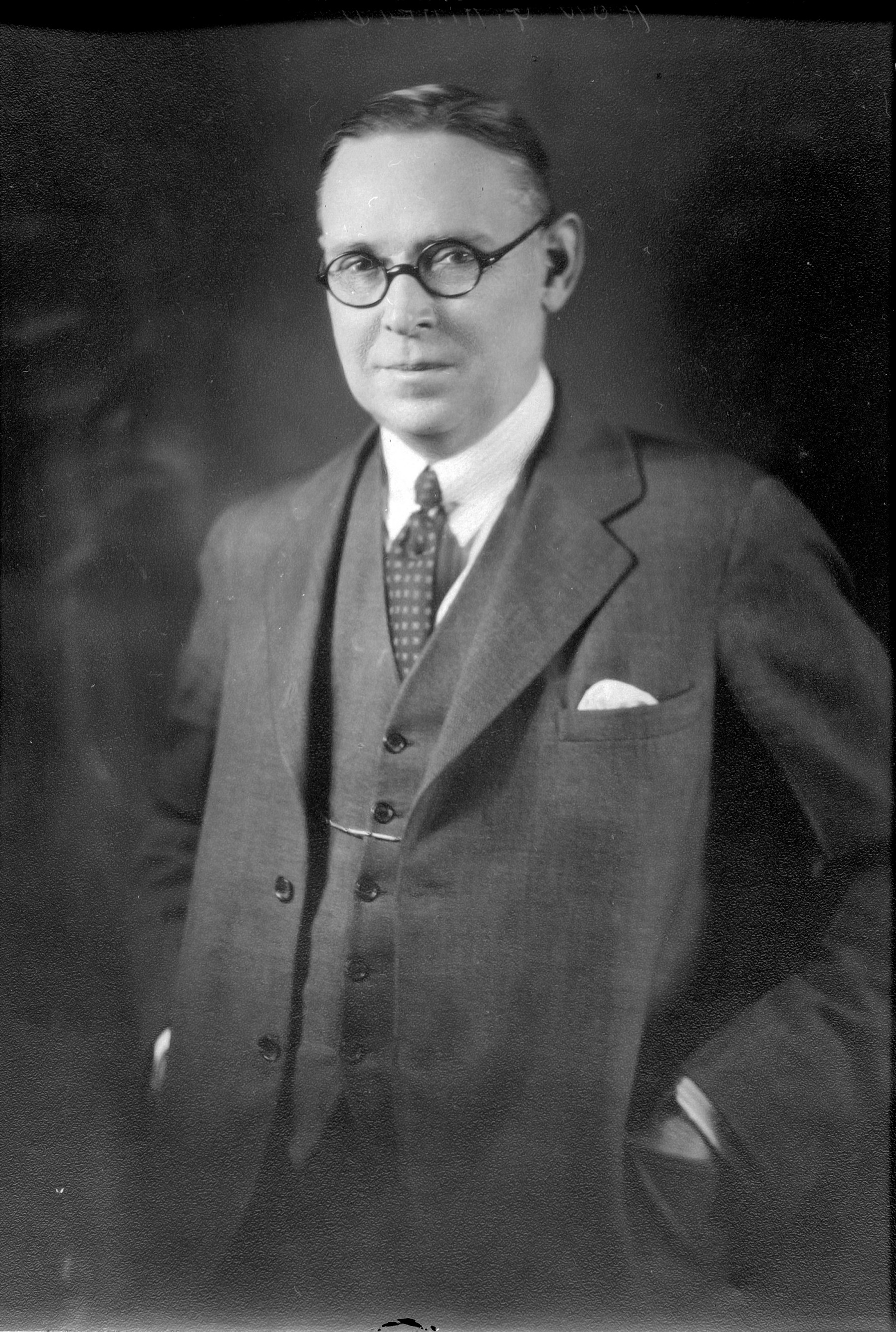
- Richard Gavin Reid
- Date formed: July 10, 1934
- Date dissolved: September 3, 1935

People and organisations
- Monarch: George V
- Lieutenant Governor: William L. Walsh
- Premier: Richard Gavin Reid
- Member party: United Farmers of Alberta
- Status in legislature: Majority

History
- Legislature term: 7th Alberta Legislature
- Predecessor: Brownlee Ministry
- Successor: Aberhart Ministry

The Reid Ministry was the combined Cabinet (called Executive Council of Alberta), chaired by Premier Richard Gavin Reid, and Ministers that governed Alberta from part way through the 7th Alberta Legislature from July 10, 1934, to September 3, 1935.

The Executive Council (commonly known as the cabinet) was made up of members of the United Farmers of Alberta which held a majority of seats in the Legislative Assembly of Alberta. The cabinet was appointed by the Lieutenant Governor of Alberta on the advice of the Premier.

== List of ministers ==
Name		Date Appointed	Date Departed
Richard Gavin Reid	President of the Executive Council (Premier)	July 10, 1934	September 3, 1935
John Russell Love	Provincial Treasurer	July 10, 1934	September 2, 1935
Richard Gavin Reid	Provincial Secretary	July 10, 1934	September 2, 1935
John Lymburn	Attorney General	July 10, 1934	September 2, 1935
Perren Baker	Minister of Education	August 13, 1921	September 2, 1935
George Hoadley	Minister of Public Health	November 3, 1923	September 2, 1935
Hugh Allen	Minister of Municipal Affairs	July 10, 1934	September 2, 1935
Frank Grisdale	Minister of Agriculture	June 2, 1934	September 2, 1935
Hugh Allen	Minister of Lands and Mines	July 10, 1934	September 2, 1935
Richard Gavin Reid	Minister of Public Works	July 10, 1934	July 13, 1934
John MacLellan	Minister of Public Works	July 14, 1934	September 2, 1935
George Hoadley	Minister of Railways and Telephones	July 10, 1934	September 2, 1935
George Hoadley	Minister of Trade and Industry	October 18, 1934	September 2, 1935
Irene Parlby	Minister Without Portfolio	August 13, 1921	August 21, 1935

== See also ==
- Executive Council of Alberta
- List of Alberta provincial ministers
