= Aberhart ministry =

Cabinet of Alberta, 1935–1943

Aberhart Ministry
- 7th ministry of Alberta

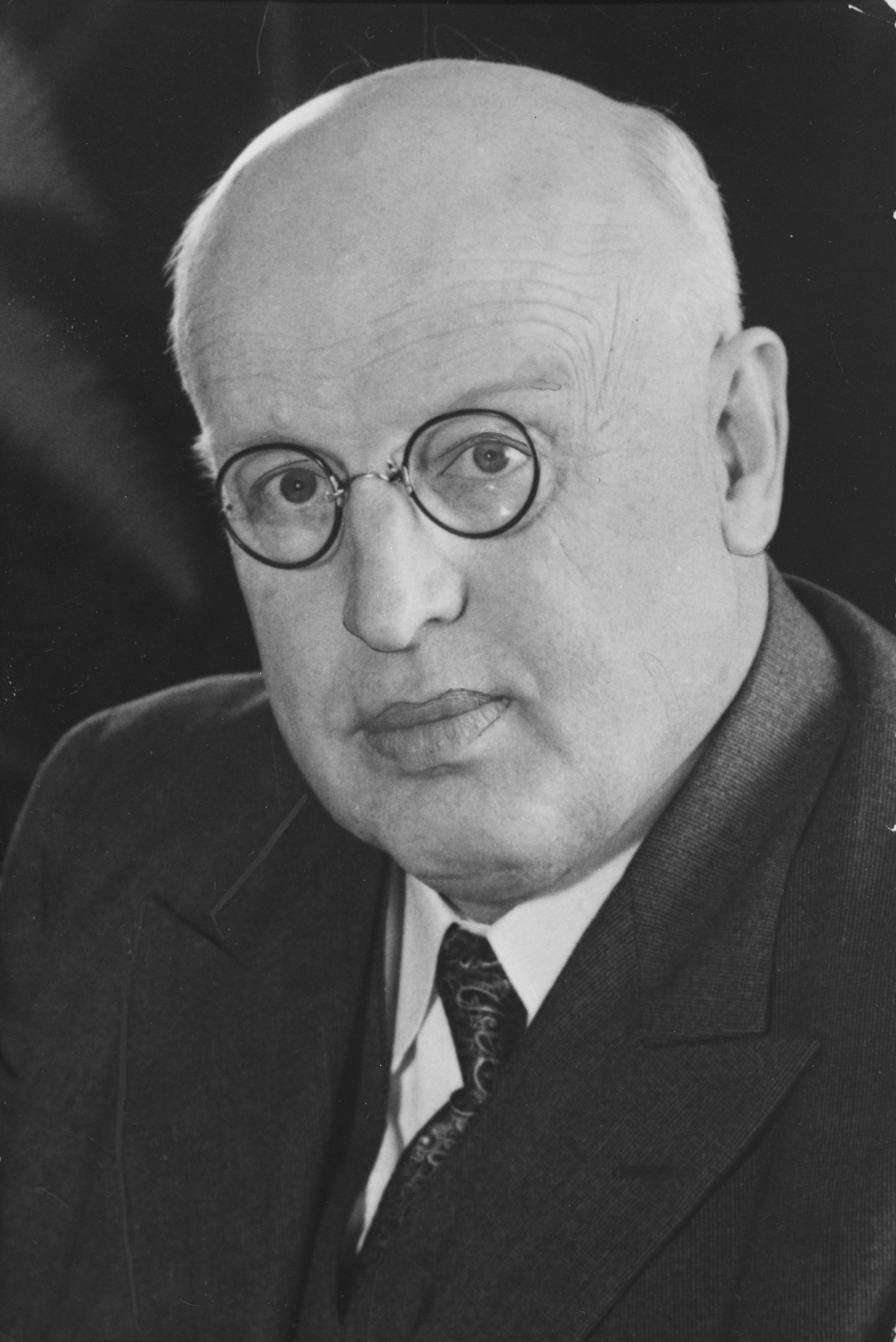
- William Aberhart in 1937.
- Date formed: September 3, 1935
- Date dissolved: May 23, 1943

People and organisations
- Monarch: George V; Edward VIII; George VI
- Lieutenant Governor: William L. Walsh; Philip Primrose; John C. Bowen
- Premier: William Aberhart
- Member party: Social Credit
- Status in legislature: Majority

History
- Legislature terms: 8th Alberta Legislature; 9th Alberta Legislature
- Predecessor: Reid Ministry
- Successor: Manning Ministry

The Aberhart Ministry was the combined Cabinet (called Executive Council of Alberta), chaired by Premier William Aberhart, and Ministers that governed Alberta from the 8th Alberta Legislature from September 3, 1935, to mid-point of the 9th Alberta Legislature on May 23, 1943.

The Executive Council (commonly known as the cabinet) was made up of members of the Alberta Social Credit Party which held a majority of seats in the Legislative Assembly of Alberta. The cabinet was appointed by the Lieutenant Governor of Alberta on the advice of the Premier.

== List of ministers ==
Name		Date Appointed	Date Departed
William Aberhart	President of the Executive Council (Premier)	September 3, 1935	May 23, 1943
Charles Cockroft	Provincial Treasurer	September 3, 1935	February 1, 1937
Solon Earl Low	Provincial Treasurer	February 2, 1937	May 23, 1943
Ernest Manning	Provincial Secretary	September 3, 1935	May 23, 1943
William Aberhart	Minister of Education	September 3, 1935	May 23, 1943
Wallace Warren Cross	Minister of Public Health	September 3, 1935	May 23, 1943
Charles Cockroft	Minister of Municipal Affairs	September 3, 1935	January 19, 1937
Lucien Maynard	Minister of Municipal Affairs	January 20, 1937	May 23, 1943
John Hugill	Attorney General	September 3, 1935	September 14, 1937
William Aberhart	Attorney General	September 15, 1937	May 23, 1943
William Chant	Minister of Agriculture	September 3, 1935	April 30, 1937
David B. Mullen	Minister of Agriculture	May 1, 1937	October 28, 1940
Duncan MacMillan	Minister of Agriculture	December 3, 1940	May 23, 1943
Charles Cathmer Ross	Minister of Lands and Mines	September 3, 1935	January 5, 1937
Nathan Eldon Tanner	Minister of Lands and Mines	January 5, 1937	May 23, 1943
William Fallow	Minister of Public Works	September 3, 1935	May 23, 1943
William Fallow	Minister of Railways and Telephones	September 3, 1935	May 23, 1943
William Chant	Minister of Trade and Industry	September 3, 1935	October 18, 1935
Ernest Manning	Minister of Trade and Industry	October 19, 1935	January 19, 1937
Wallace Warren Cross	Minister of Trade and Industry	January 20, 1937	July 1, 1937
Ernest Manning	Minister of Trade and Industry	July 2, 1937	May 23, 1943
Lucien Maynard	Minister Without Portfolio	May 12, 1936	January 19, 1937

== See also ==
- Executive Council of Alberta
- List of Alberta provincial ministers
