= Fedun =

Fedun (Ukrainian and Russian: Федун) is a gender-neutral Slavic surname that may refer to

- Leonid Fedun (born 1956), Russian billionaire businessman
- Peter Fedun (1919–1951), Ukrainian nationalist
- Taylor Fedun (born 1988), Ukrainian-Canadian ice hockey player
- William Fedun (1879–1949), Canadian politician
