= Richard Gavin Reid =

Premier of Alberta, Canada, 1934–1935

The Honourable Richard Gavin Reid
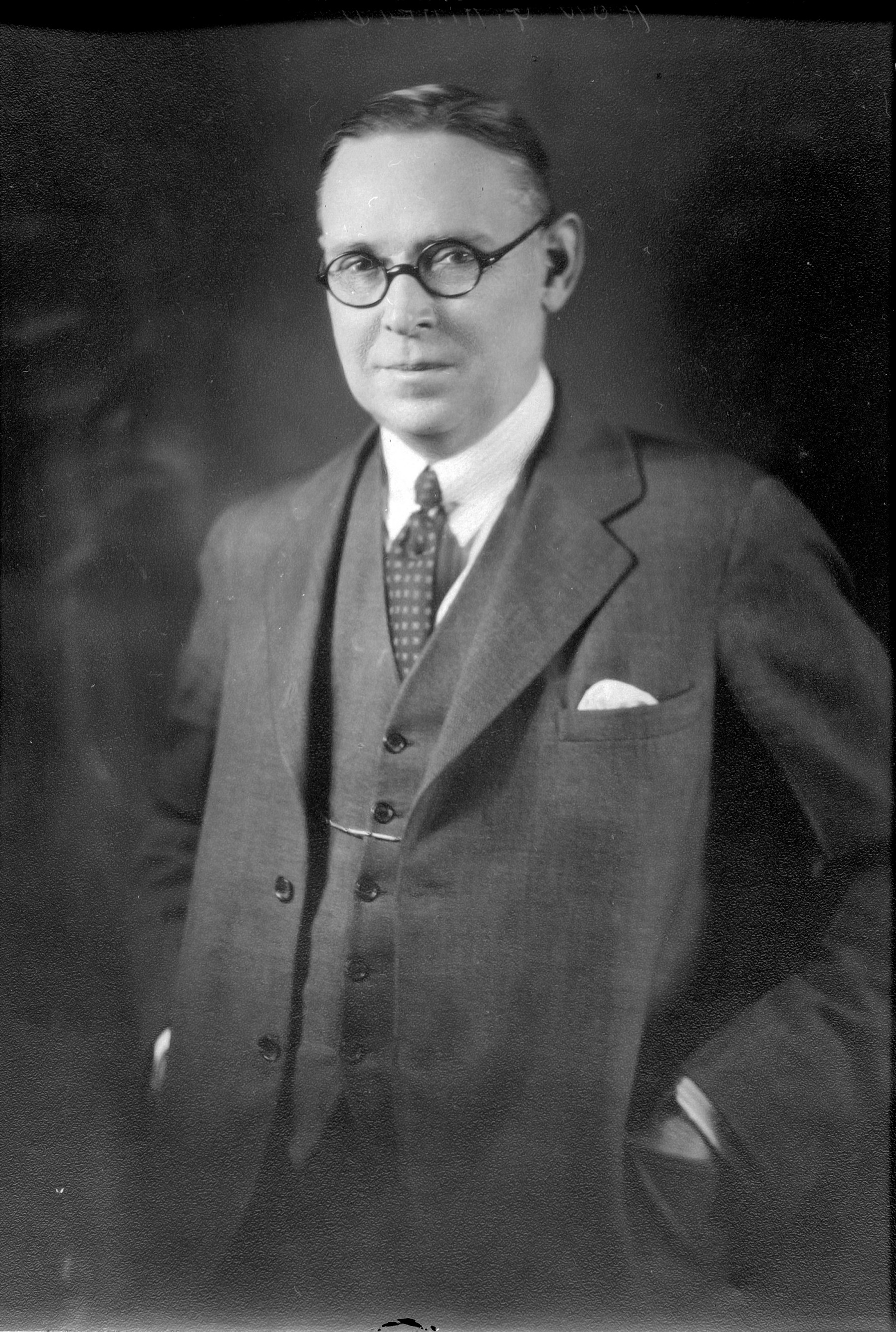
- Richard Gavin Reid

6th Premier of Alberta
- In office 10 July 1934 – 3 September 1935
- Monarch: George V
- Lieutenant Governor: William L. Walsh
- Preceded by: John Edward Brownlee
- Succeeded by: William Aberhart

Member of the Legislative Assembly of Alberta for Vermilion
- In office 18 July 1921 – 22 August 1935
- Preceded by: Arthur Ebbett
- Succeeded by: William Fallow

Alberta Treasury Board President
- In office 10 July 1934 – 3 September 1935
- Preceded by: New position
- Succeeded by: Position abolished (Note: The position was merged with that of Provincial Treasurer until 2004, when Shirley McClellan filled it)

Alberta Provincial Secretary
- In office 10 July 1934 – 3 September 1935
- Preceded by: John Edward Brownlee
- Succeeded by: Ernest Manning

Alberta Minister of Public Works
- In office 10 July 1934 – 14 July 1934
- Preceded by: Oran McPherson
- Succeeded by: John MacLellan

Alberta Minister of Health
- In office 13 August 1921 – 1923
- Preceded by: Charles R. Mitchell
- Succeeded by: George Hoadley

Alberta Provincial Treasurer
- In office 1923 – 10 July 1934
- Preceded by: Herbert Greenfield
- Succeeded by: John Russell Love

Alberta Minister of Municipal Affairs
- In office 23 November 1925 – 10 July 1934
- Preceded by: Herbert Greenfield
- Succeeded by: Hugh Allen
- In office 31 August 1921 – 1923
- Preceded by: Charles R. Mitchell
- Succeeded by: Herbert Greenfield

Alberta Minister of Lands and Mines
- In office 10 October 1930 – 10 July 1934
- Preceded by: New position
- Succeeded by: Hugh Allen

Personal details
- Born: 17 January 1879 Glasgow, Scotland
- Died: 17 October 1980 (aged 101) Edmonton, Alberta, Canada
- Resting place: Edmonton Cemetery
- Party: United Farmers of Alberta (UFA)
- Spouse: Marion Stuart
- Children: Five
- Profession: Politician

Richard Gavin "Dick" Reid (17 January 1879 – 17 October 1980) was a Canadian politician who served as the sixth premier of Alberta from 1934 to 1935. He was the last member of the United Farmers of Alberta (UFA) to hold the office, and that party's defeat at the hands of the upstart Social Credit League in the 1935 election made him the shortest serving premier to that point in Alberta's history.

Born near Glasgow, Scotland, Reid worked a number of jobs as a young adult—including wholesaler, army medic (during the Second Boer War), farmhand, lumberjack and dentist—and immigrated to Canada in 1903. He involved himself in local politics and joined the recently formed UFA, which nominated him to run in the 1921 provincial election as its candidate in Vermilion. The UFA won the election, and Reid served in several capacities in the cabinets of premiers Herbert Greenfield and John Edward Brownlee, where he established a reputation for competence and fiscal conservatism. When a sex scandal forced Brownlee from office in 1934, Reid was the caucus' unanimous choice to succeed him as premier.

When Reid took office, Alberta was experiencing the Great Depression. Reid took measures to ease Albertans' suffering, but believed that inducing a full economic recovery was beyond the capacity of the provincial government. In this climate, Alberta voters were attracted to the economic theories of evangelical preacher William Aberhart, who advocated a version of social credit. Despite Reid's claims that Aberhart's proposals were economically and constitutionally unfeasible, Social Credit routed the UFA in the 1935 election; Reid's party did not retain a single seat. Reid lived forty-five years after his defeat, but these years were spent in obscurity; he never returned to political life.

== Early life ==
Reid was born 17 January 1879 near Glasgow, Scotland, to George and Margaret (Ogston) Reid. He attended school in Glasgow and worked for several years in the wholesale provisions business before enlisting in the Royal Army Medical Corps. He served in South Africa as a Lance-Sergeant from 1900 to 1902 during the Second Boer War, doing hospital duty, before returning to Scotland. There he began to plan his future, considering returning to South Africa to live before deciding on Canada.

He arrived in Killarney, Manitoba, in 1903, where he worked as a farmhand during the harvest. When winter came, he found work as a lumberjack in Fort William, Ontario. A voyage west followed, and he set up a homestead in east-central Alberta. Once there, he began to practice dentistry, drawing on his army experience. On 9 September 1919, he married Marion Stuart. They had three sons and two daughters.

== Early political career ==
=== Entry into politics ===
Reid's political career began with four years on the municipal council of Buffalo Coulee, around present-day Vermilion. He spent two of these as Reeve. He was instrumental in founding the Vermilion municipal hospital district, on whose board he served for many years. Federally, he was active with the United Farmers of Alberta Battle River Political Association, of which he became president.

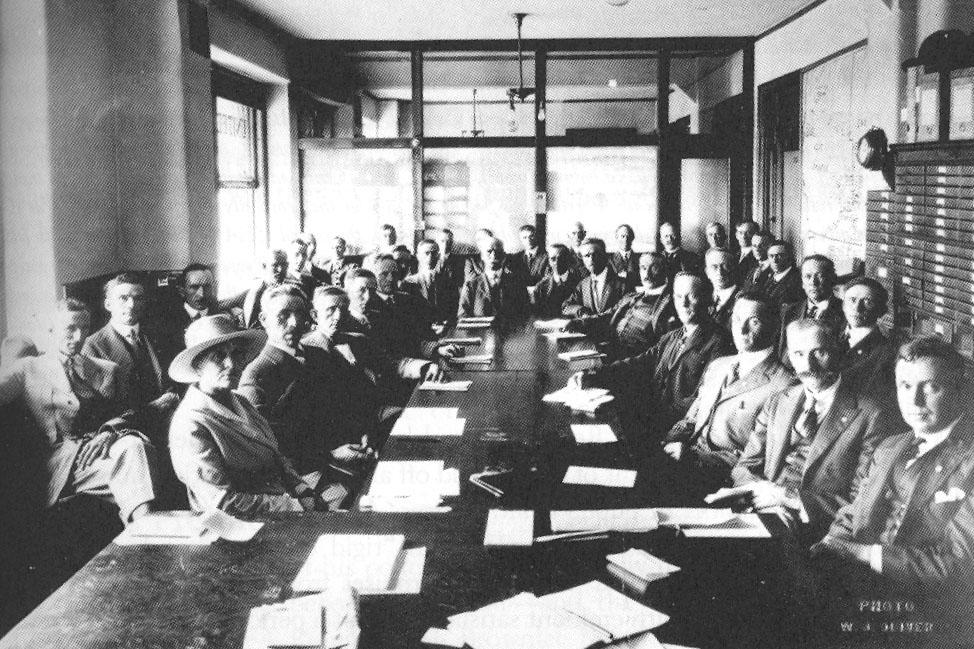
The first meeting of the UFA caucus following the 1921 election, at which it selected Herbert Greenfield as its Premier. Reid, who chaired the meeting, sits at the extreme right.

Reid was nominated as the UFA candidate in Vermilion during the 1921 provincial election, the first in which the UFA ran candidates. The Legislative Assembly of Alberta was dominated by the Liberals, who had governed Alberta since its creation in 1905. To Reid's great surprise, he defeated his Liberal opponent and was elected to the legislature, along with 37 of his fellow UFA candidates—enough to form a majority government. He chaired the first meeting of the new UFA caucus, at which it selected Herbert Greenfield as Premier. Reid was re-elected in the 1926 and 1930 elections.

=== Cabinet career ===
Reid occupied high-ranking cabinet positions in Greenfield's government and that of his successor, John Edward Brownlee. Greenfield appointed him Minister of Health and Minister of Municipal Affairs in 1921. In the former capacity, he drew on his past experience with the Vermilion board in establishing new municipal health boards. He also proposed a program of eugenics through the sterilisation of the mentally handicapped, which in 1928 led to the Sexual Sterilization Act of Alberta. As an advocate of government-wide economy, he laid off all school inspection nurses and many public health nurses. This inclination towards thrift was also evident in his performance as Minister of Municipal Affairs, in which he resisted a 1926 call from several municipalities to transfer a greater proportion of the responsibility for caring for indigents to the province. In 1929, he disagreed with them again when he insisted that they be responsible for 10% of the old-age pensions paid to their residents.

In 1923 Greenfield moved Reid out of both of his portfolios and made him Provincial Treasurer, where he perpetuated his fiscal conservatism across the government. Early in his tenure, he presented a brief to cabinet recommending that ministers reduce their budgets and that the government create a purchasing department tasked with coordinating spending on supplies. In these proposals he found a close ally in Brownlee, Greenfield's Attorney-General, and when Brownlee succeeded Greenfield as Premier in 1925 he kept Reid as Provincial Treasurer and re-appointed him as Minister of Municipal Affairs. Brownlee and Reid had a history of working closely not only on fiscal issues, but also on agricultural ones: in July 1923, they had travelled together to investigate the creation of a wheat pool in Alberta. This trip included a meeting with cooperative pioneer Aaron Sapiro in San Francisco and a visit to Chicago's commodity market. Both Reid and Brownlee concluded that a pool ought to be proceeded with cautiously, if at all, though this view was overruled when a later visit by Sapiro to Alberta generated sufficient enthusiasm that the government had little choice but to go along with the creation of the Alberta Wheat Pool.

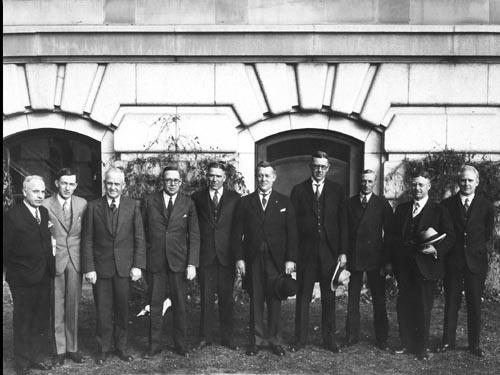
Reid, fourth from the left, among members of the Alberta and Saskatchewan cabinets, c. 1930.

With Brownlee as premier and Reid as Provincial Treasurer, government deficits ceased: the budget showed a surplus in every year from 1925 until 1930, except for 1927. In 1929, Reid predicted that Alberta was on the cusp of a period of economic expansion; instead, he was soon confronted with the Great Depression. He drastically cut provincial spending and raised taxes, in part by creating a new income tax. He reluctantly accepted that these measures could not prevent a return to deficit spending. His willingness to outspend revenues was due less to any Keynesian desire to stimulate the economy than to a belief that there was no further spending to be cut or further taxes that could reasonably be raised. Conversely, he rejected calls from the opposition Liberals to cut taxes as a stimulus measure.

Though Brownlee was no more enthusiastic than Reid about deficits, his continued confidence in his Provincial Treasurer was evidenced by his decision to give him yet another ministerial portfolio. In 1930 Brownlee secured Alberta's long-sought control over its natural resources from the federal government, and he appointed Reid Alberta's first Minister of Lands and Mines on 10 October 1930. In this capacity, Reid favoured private over public ownership. He opposed calls from his own party to promote government-developed hydroelectricity projects, and viewed the provincially owned railways as a burden to the government, though they finally turned a profit in 1927. He was a leading advocate of selling them to private interests, a course that was eventually followed in 1929.

== Premier ==
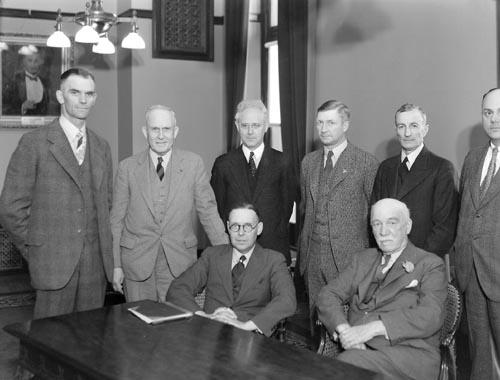
Reid's cabinet. He sits at left.

In 1934, Brownlee was implicated in a sex scandal, as a young family friend and her father sued him for seduction. By Reid's account, he had to convince his premier not to quit "hundreds of times". When the jury found in favour of the plaintiffs, however, Brownlee had no choice, and resigned effective 10 July 1934. Reid was the most prominent minister in the cabinet and among the most popular, and was the UFA caucus' unanimous choice to take over. He also replaced Brownlee as Provincial Secretary and installed himself in the newly created position of Treasury Board President.

The UFA was in an uncertain position when Reid became Premier; besides Brownlee's resignation, longtime Minister of Public Works Oran McPherson was in the midst of a scandalous divorce and had also left cabinet, and UFA MLAs Peter Miskew and Omer St. Germain had crossed the floor to the Liberals. Additionally, the province's economic condition remained poor. Liberal leader William R. Howson tried to take advantage of this to undermine the government and position himself as the province's next Premier; he attacked Reid relentlessly for what he alleged were spendthrift habits, and suggested the province's tax rates were causing the confiscation of family homes. Reid asserted in response that Alberta's taxes had decreased since 1921, and criticised Howson for simultaneously attacking government spending and demanding new infrastructure projects.

In the meantime, Reid's government took a number of policy initiatives. It passed legislation authorizing the government purchase of cattle from farmers who could no longer afford feed, and worked out a cost-sharing agreement with the federal government and the railways to relocate farmers fleeing the province's dust belt. Reid also called for the creation of a federal wheat marketing board, and proposed legislation—the Agricultural Industry Stabilisation Act—that protected from creditors any portion of a farmer's revenue that was used on operating costs for his farm or living expenses for his family. Despite these measures, Reid found himself at odds with his party's membership, which was reacting to the Great Depression by following an increasingly socialist path. He found UFA President Robert Gardiner to be of the "far left", and considered the Cooperative Commonwealth Federation, in whose founding many UFA members had participated, to be an "unholy amalgamation". Even so, his government experimented with a form of universal health insurance, to be jointly funded by government, employers, and employees, that would provide Albertans with free medical, dental, and hospital care; the project was to be launched as a pilot project in Camrose, but was never begun because of the intervention of the 1935 election. More controversially, Reid's government reacted to McPherson's divorce and its attendant coverage by proposing to ban newspapers from covering divorce proceedings, a proposal that prompted Liberal MLA Joseph Miville Dechene to compare Reid to Hitler, Mussolini, and Stalin.

=== Social credit ===
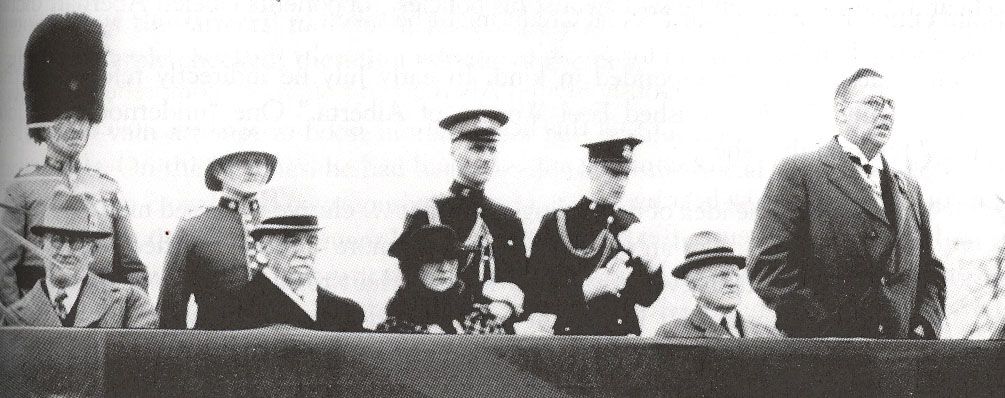
Reid, right, giving a speech in Edmonton on the occasion of George V's silver jubilee

A more dangerous opponent than Howson was William Aberhart, the Calgary preacher who was proposing a form of social credit to cure the province's ills. Social credit, the brainchild of British engineer C. H. Douglas, purported to bridge the gap between a society's production and its purchasing power; Aberhart maintained that this gap was the source of Alberta's economic hardships. Reid was leery of Aberhart though he, like most politicians of the era, pronounced himself in favour of Douglas's philosophy. T. C. Byrne suggests that this expressed support was dishonest, that Reid considered social credit in all of its forms to be "complete nonsense", and paid it lip service only because of its popularity among voters.

Though he was gaining adherents, Aberhart insisted that his aim was not to enter politics, but to persuade existing parties to adopt social credit in their platforms. To this end, he appeared at the UFA convention of 15 January 1935. The night before, he organised a reception for delegates. Besides Aberhart, it featured actors portraying two characters of whom Aberhart had been making considerable use in presentations around the province: the Man from Mars, who expressed bewilderment that poverty could exist in the midst of plenty and that governments were doing nothing about it, and Kant B. Dunn, who brought up straw man arguments against social credit for Aberhart to dismantle. Another of Aberhart's characters, the bumbling socialist C. C. Heifer, did not make an appearance; Aberhart biographers David Elliott and Iris Miller suggest that this was to avoid alienating the many UFA members who supported socialism.

The next day, the UFA began debate on a resolution that read

Resolved that a system of social credit as outlined by William Aberhart, Calgary, be put in as a plank in the UFA provincial platform to be brought before the electorate at the next provincial election.

Debate was vigorous. One delegate said that UFA members wanted social credit, and if they could not get it through the UFA they would find other means. After three hours, UFA Vice President Norman Priestly noted in frustration that delegates were debating the merits of "a system of social credit as outlined by" Aberhart without ever having heard Aberhart outline his proposed system. It was agreed to invite Aberhart to appear. Using the analogy of blood flowing through the human body, he argued that the 4 imperial quarts (4.5 L) of blood contained in the human body were sufficient for the heart to pump much more than that per day; so it was, he argued, with currency, whose circulation needed to be accelerated to enhance Albertans' purchasing power. He closed by expressing pessimism that the delegates would choose to support social credit, and this pessimism proved well-founded: though sources are inconsistent on the precise outcome—journalist John Barr reports that the exact vote was not recorded, while historian Bradford Rennie states there were 30 affirmative votes out of 400 delegates present—there is agreement that the resolution was handily defeated. While the vote appeared to be a decisive victory for Reid and his fellow traditionalists, Byrne suggests that many members abstained.

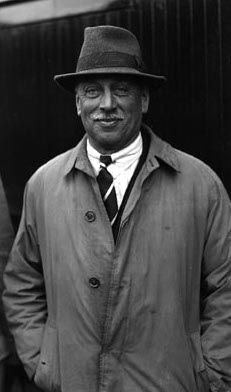
C. H. Douglas proved more evasive than Reid had anticipated in evaluating the Aberhart version of social credit.

The threat from within apparently defeated, Reid and his government turned their attention to the threat from without: the convention's repudiation had convinced Aberhart that his Social Credit League must run candidates in the next election. Reid's defence took two forms. The first was an overt attack on Aberhart and his policies. He insisted that Aberhart's proposed "monthly credit dividends" of Can$25 could not be issued unless taxes increased tenfold. He argued that Aberhart's proposed means of raising revenue—"unearned increments" and "production levies"—were actually disguised taxes, which would be paid primarily by farmers, and that his claims that the necessary credit could be created "at the stroke of a fountain pen" on an accounting ledger were absurd. He further pointed out that elements of Aberhart's plan, including the provincial government's entry into banking and the creation of a provincial tariff, were ultra vires the province under the Canadian constitution. These themes were expounded on by Priestly and Brownlee, both of whom undertook speaking tours and radio addresses, and by legal and economic experts commissioned by the government.

The second element of Reid's approach was to call into question Aberhart's understanding of social credit by exposing inconsistencies between his statements and the theories advanced by Douglas. Douglas and Aberhart did not like each other, and Douglas did not believe that Aberhart fully understood his theories; though he declined to comment publicly, one of his deputies once called one of Aberhart's pamphlets "fallacious from start to finish". Hoping to capitalize on this rift, Reid invited Douglas to come to Alberta and serve as "Economic Reconstruction Advisor" at an annual fee of $2,500 plus a $2,000 expense allowance for each of his annual three-week trips to the province. Douglas accepted. Angered that the government had incurred this sizable expense without consulting the legislature, Conservative leader David Duggan introduced a motion calling on Aberhart to be hired in a similar capacity. This suited Reid, who hoped that by inducing both men to submit detailed plans he would at last have something concrete from Aberhart to attack, and something equally concrete from Douglas with which to contrast it. Aberhart confounded Reid's plan by declining his offer. Douglas, for his part, provided mixed results: on his way to Edmonton he publicly repudiated Aberhart's impugned pamphlet and also pronounced himself against the creation of a provincial social credit political vehicle. On the other hand, shortly after his arrival he sent Aberhart a letter, gleefully released by Aberhart, asserting that there was no conflict between the "Douglas" and "Aberhart" versions of social credit. Moreover, his interim report to the government concerned itself primarily with political and legal, rather than economic, realities: he recommended setting up a provincially controlled media outlet to counter the anti-social credit propaganda he anticipated from the privately owned press, organizing a provincial government credit institution, and accumulating a stockpile of currency, stocks, and bonds. He also suggested that the UFA might need to form a coalition government to implement social credit. The report was of little use to Reid's government, so he had his Attorney-General, John Lymburn, ask Douglas to critique one of Aberhart's radio broadcasts. Douglas demurred, and made only vague comments about minor technical errors in the transcript.

Reid's approach to combating Aberhart's influence had failed. The first element, attacking the validity of Aberhart's ideas directly, had failed because much of the Alberta public, in abject poverty, was not interested in hearing economic and legal arguments against social credit. This state of mind was illustrated by a voter's comments to Brownlee on Aberhart's proposals:

Mr. Brownlee, we have listened to you with a great deal of attention and the answers you have given seem pretty hard to meet. But I have one more question ... I'm selling my wheat at 25 cents a bushel. If I tried to sell a steer tomorrow I'd probably hardly get enough to pay the freight. I get three cents a dozen for eggs. I'm lucky to get a dollar for a can of cream. Will you tell me what I've got to lose?

The second part of the strategy, contrasting Aberhart's proposals with Douglas's, failed largely because both men were too evasive in their statements to make any kind of direct comparison of their views. Lakeland College historian Franklin Foster offers an additional explanation: when Albertans were exposed to the charismatic evangelist Aberhart and the dry technocrat Douglas, they preferred the former, irrespective of credentials or economic expertise.

=== Electoral defeat ===
When the election came in August 1935, Aberhart offered economic recovery while Reid offered criticisms of Aberhart. Highlighting the UFA's record of clean government, low taxes, and fiscal responsibility, Reid committed himself and his government to bringing a sense of security. More tangibly, he promised to build a government oil refinery (predicting that "the near future will witness the greatest explorations for oil which this province has ever known"). Most of the campaign was conducted around Social Credit's promise to pull the province out of depression with its monetary theories. Reid alleged that Aberhart's policies would destroy the province's credit and leave it unable to borrow the money it needed to carry on, but voters—even those sceptical of Social Credit's promises—saw no alternative hopes offered by the UFA. On 11 August, election day, every UFA MLA was defeated; Reid himself finished third in his riding, barely ahead of the Communist candidate, and resigned as Premier effective 22 August.

Time would prove Reid correct in most of his criticisms of Aberhart: he did lack a specific economic agenda, much of his legislation was struck down by the courts, and the depression did continue for several more years in Alberta. This was of cold comfort to Reid, whose defeat was total: at 408 days, his time as Premier was the shortest in the province's history to that point.

== Life after politics ==
After the election, Reid orchestrated a quick transfer of power. The Social Credit victory had provoked a bank run, and he wanted to re-establish stability as quickly as possible. Moreover, the province needed to borrow a large sum of money to meet even its short-term obligations, and the UFA, as a lame duck government, was unable to make promises to would-be creditors. Once in office, confronted with a dire financial situation, Aberhart accused the UFA government of mismanagement. Reid responded in January 1936 that there had been no such mismanagement, that the province's financial problems were due to Social Credit's policies, both real and promised, and that had the UFA won re-election in 1935 it could have continued governing without serious difficulty. He also resisted insinuations that it had been too restrained in helping impoverished farmers: as late as 1969 he was offering the view that shrinking sources of provincial revenue made further assistance impossible.

Apart from these occasional forays defending his record, Reid withdrew from politics. He became a commission agent, and later the librarian for Canadian Utilities Limited. For this latter role, he was made an honorary member of the Edmonton Library Association. During World War II, he served on the Canadian government's mobilisation board. Richard Reid died in Edmonton 17 October 1980 at the age of 101. He was cremated, and his ashes buried in Edmonton.

Historians generally view Reid as a victim of circumstance: like many governments across Canada, his was defeated by the Great Depression. Rennie argues that Reid's approach to government, frugal and non-interventionist, was well-suited to the prosperous 1920s but less so to the 1930s, and highlights his lack of charisma. But he also writes that virtually nobody could have won the 1935 election for the UFA. Foster agrees, assessing Reid as "a quietly competent, gentle man" who "merited the confidence of his colleagues", but who was in 1935 "distinctly out of his element". As Rennie closes, "In 1935 Albertans wanted a saviour. Richard Gavin Reid was a mere mortal."

== Electoral record ==
=== As party leader ===
1935 Alberta general election
Party	Party leader	# of candidates	Seats			Popular vote		
Party	Party leader	# of candidates	1930	1935	% Change	#	%	% Change
Social Credit	William Aberhart	63		56		163,700	54.25%	
Liberal	William Howson	61	11	5	-54.5%	69,845	23.14%	-1.45%
Conservative	David Milwyn Duggan	39	6	2	-66.7%	19,358	6.41%	-8.44%
United Farmers	Richard G. Reid	45	39	-	-100%	33,063	11.00%	-28.41%
Communist	Jan Lakeman	9		-		5,771	1.91%	
Labour	Fred J. White	11	4	-	-100%	5,086	1.68%	-5.95%
Independent		7	3	-	-100%	2,740	0.90%	-12.62%
Independent Liberal		1		-		955	0.31%	
United Front		1		-		560	0.19%	
Independent Conservative		1		-		258	0.08%	
Independent Labour		1		-		224	0.07%	
Reconstruction	Elsie Wright	1		-		192	0.06%	
Total		240	63	63	-	301,752	100%	

=== As MLA ===
1921 Alberta general election results (Vermilion)		Turnout N.A.	
Affiliation	Candidate	Votes	%
United Farmers	Richard Gavin Reid	2,955	75.9%
Liberal	Arthur W. Ebbett	939	24.1%
1921 by-election results (Vermilion)		Turnout N/A	
Affiliation	Candidate	Votes	
United Farmers	Richard Gavin Reid	Acclaimed	
1926 Alberta general election results (Vermilion)		Turnout 67.5%	
Affiliation	Candidate	Votes	%
United Farmers	Richard Gavin Reid	1,981	64.6%
Conservative	W. J. McNab	592	19.3%
Liberal	Arthur W. Ebbett	492	16.1%
1930 Alberta general election results (Vermilion)		Turnout 62.3%	
Affiliation	Candidate	Votes	%
United Farmers	Richard Gavin Reid	2,551	75.79%
Liberal	Robert B. Hall	815	24.21%

1935 Alberta general election: Vermilion
Party	Candidate	Votes 1st count	%	Votes final count	±%
Social Credit	William A. Fallow	2,452	44.81%	2,664	–
Liberal	Arthur P. Hunter	1,062	19.41%	1,437	-4.80%
United Farmers	Richard Gavin Reid	876	16.01%	–	-59.78%
Communist	William Halina	838	15.31%	–	–
Conservative	Albert E. Williams	244	4.46%	–	–
Total		5,472	–	–	–
Rejected, spoiled and declined		172	–	–	–
Eligible electors / turnout		6,816	82.81%	20.48%	–
Social Credit gain from United Farmers		Swing		-13.09%	
Source(s) Source: "Vermilion Official Results 1935 Alberta general election". Alberta Heritage Community Foundation. Mardon 130 Instant-runoff voting requires a candidate to receive a plurality (greater than 50%) of the votes. As no candidate received a plurality of votes, the bottom candidate was eliminated and their 2nd place votes were applied to both other candidates until one received a plurality.
