= Camrose (federal electoral district) =

Former federal electoral district in Alberta, Canada

Coordinates: 53.09°N 112.77°W

Alberta electoral district

Defunct federal electoral district
- Legislature: House of Commons
- District created: 1925
- District abolished: 1953
- First contested: 1925
- Last contested: 1949

Camrose was a federal electoral district in Alberta, Canada, that was represented in the House of Commons of Canada from 1925 to 1953. This riding was created in 1924 from parts of Battle River, Red Deer and Victoria ridings.

It was abolished in 1953 when it was redistributed into Acadia, Battle River—Camrose, Edmonton—Strathcona, and Vegreville ridings.

== Historical Boundaries ==
1924 representation order

1933 representation order

1947 representation order

== Members of Parliament ==
Camrose
Parliament	Years	Member	Party
District created from Battle River, Red Deer and Victoria
15th	1925–1926	William Thomas Lucas	United Farmers
16th	1926–1930	William Thomas Lucas	United Farmers
17th	1930–1935	William Thomas Lucas	United Farmers
18th	1935–1940	James Alexander Marshall	Social Credit
19th	1940–1945	James Alexander Marshall	Social Credit
20th	1945–1949	James Alexander Marshall	Social Credit
21st	1949–1953	Hilliard Beyerstein	Social Credit
District dissolved into Acadia, Battle River—Camrose, Edmonton—Strathcona, and Vegreville

== Election results ==
=== 1949 ===
1949 Canadian federal election
Party	Candidate	Votes	%	±%
Social Credit	Hilliard Beyerstein	7,364	46.87	+0.81
Liberal	Frank Bryan Ince	4,497	28.62	+12.61
Co-operative Commonwealth	Alfred O. Arntson	2,402	15.29	–10.61
Progressive Conservative	Charles Henry McCleary	1,448	9.22	–2.82
Total valid votes		15,711	99.36	
Total rejected ballots		101	0.64	–0.37
Turnout		15,812	70.53	–3.70
Eligible voters		22,420		
Social Credit hold		Swing		+6.71
Source: Library of Parliament

=== 1945 ===
1945 Canadian federal election
Party	Candidate	Votes	%	±%
Social Credit	James Alexander Marshall	7,194	46.06	–3.36
Co-operative Commonwealth	Chester Ronning	4,045	25.90	+9.85
Liberal	Paul LaVega Farnalls	2,501	16.01	–18.52
Progressive Conservative	Russell Joseph Bowes	1,880	12.04	–
Total valid votes		15,620	98.99	
Total rejected ballots		160	1.01	+0.07
Turnout		15,780	74.23	+17.64
Eligible voters		21,259		
Social Credit hold		Swing		–6.61
Source: Library of Parliament

=== 1940 ===
1940 Canadian federal election
Party	Candidate	Votes	%	±%
Social Credit	James Alexander Marshall	6,359	49.42	–16.74
Liberal	Charles Claeys	4,443	34.53	+16.15
Co-operative Commonwealth	Sigurd Lefsrud	2,065	16.05	–
Total valid votes		12,867	99.06	
Total rejected ballots		122	0.94	–0.01
Turnout		12,989	56.59	–9.24
Eligible voters		22,953		
Social Credit hold		Swing		–16.45
Source: Library of Parliament

=== 1935 ===
1935 Canadian federal election
Party	Candidate	Votes	%	±%
Social Credit	James Alexander Marshall	8,776	66.16	–
Liberal	George P. Smith	2,438	18.38	–22.30
Conservative	William Thomas Lucas	2,051	15.46	–
Total valid votes		13,265	99.05	
Total rejected ballots		127	0.95	+0.95
Turnout		13,392	65.83	+3.44
Eligible voters		20,344		
Social Credit gain from United Farmers of Alberta		Swing		+44.23
Source: Library of Parliament

=== 1930 ===
1930 Canadian federal election
Party	Candidate	Votes	%	±%
United Farmers of Alberta	William Thomas Lucas	6,462	59.32	–0.05
Liberal	Donald Randolph McIvor	4,432	40.68	+0.05
Total valid votes		10,894	100.00	
Total rejected ballots		unknown		
Turnout		10,894	62.39	+11.59
Eligible voters		17,462		
United Farmers of Alberta hold		Swing		–0.05
Source: Library of Parliament

=== 1926 ===
1926 Canadian federal election
Party	Candidate	Votes	%	±%
United Farmers of Alberta	William Thomas Lucas	5,100	59.37	+3.31
Liberal	Donald Randolph McIvor	3,490	40.63	+15.48
Total valid votes		8,590	100.00	
Total rejected ballots		unknown		
Turnout		8,590	50.80	+4.75
Eligible voters		16,909		
United Farmers of Alberta hold		Swing		+9.40
Source: Library of Parliament

=== 1925 ===
1925 Canadian federal election
Party	Candidate	Votes	%	±%
United Farmers of Alberta	William Thomas Lucas	4,202	56.06	–
Liberal	John Wilson Thomas	1,885	25.15	–
Conservative	Albert Scott	1,409	18.80	–
Total valid votes		7,496	100.00	
Total rejected ballots		unknown		
Turnout		7,496	46.05	–
Eligible voters		16,279		
United Farmers of Alberta notional gain		Swing		N/A
Source: Library of Parliament

== See also ==
- List of Canadian electoral districts
- Historical federal electoral districts of Canada
