= James Bismark Holden =

Canadian politician

Member of the Legislative Assembly of Alberta
- In office July 16, 1906 – March 22, 1909
- Preceded by: Matthew McCauley
- Succeeded by: Archibald Campbell
- Constituency: Vermilion
- In office March 22, 1909 – March 25, 1913
- Preceded by: New district
- Succeeded by: Joseph McCallum
- Constituency: Vegreville

Personal details
- Born: October 4, 1876 Singhampton, Ontario
- Died: April 10, 1956 (aged 79) Vegreville, Alberta
- Party: Liberal
- Spouse: Gertrude Jane Worth
- Occupation: politician

James Bismark Holden (October 4, 1876 – April 10, 1956) was a businessman and politician from Alberta, Canada. He served in the Legislative Assembly of Alberta from 1906 to 1913 as a member of the Liberal Party. He also served as the mayor of Vegreville, Alberta from 1917 to 1945.

== Alberta legislature ==
Holden ran for election to the Alberta Legislature in a by-election held on July 16, 1906, as a Liberal candidate in the electoral district of Vermilion. He won the seat by acclamation to hold the district for his party.

Upon redistribution in 1909, Holden ran in the new electoral district of Vegreville that year and was re-elected. He retired from the legislature at its dissolution in 1913.

== Other activities ==
Holden moved to Vancouver to get into the shipping business, but soon moved back to Alberta when it went bust. He married Gertrude Jane Worth.

After his time in provincial politics, Holden served as mayor of Vegreville, Alberta from 1917 to 1945.

Holden also attempted to enter federal politics. He ran for a seat in the House of Commons of Canada in the 1917 federal election, as a Unionist in the electoral district of Victoria, Alberta. He was defeated in a close race by Laurier Liberal candidate William Henry White. He ran in Victoria again in the 1921 election, as a Conservative; he finished a distant third. He ran again in the 1935 Canadian federal election, again as a Conservative. He finished last among five candidates in Vegreville.

The town of Holden, Alberta, founded in 1905, is named in his honour.
