= Jack Shera =

Canadian politician

John William Shera

Member of the North-West Legislative Assembly
- In office 1898–1905
- Preceded by: Frank Fraser Tims
- Succeeded by: Francis Walker (in Victoria)
- Constituency: Victoria

Personal details
- Born: 1867 or 1869 Ireland
- Died: 1955
- Party: Conservative

John "Jack" William Shera was a Canadian politician who served as a Member of the North-West Legislative Assembly from 1898 until 1905, representing the district of Victoria in what is now eastern Alberta.

== Early life ==
Shera was born in Ireland in the 1860s. He emigrated to Canada in 1872, first settling in Toronto. He moved to Regina (then part of the Northwest Territories) in 1882, and later to Fort Saskatchewan.

== Political career ==
He first ran for office as an independent in the Northwest Territories general election of 1898, unseating incumbent Victoria MLA Frank Fraser Tims. He was re-elected in 1902 with a larger share of the vote.

When Alberta became a province in 1905, Shera sought re-election in the smaller Victoria district, this time running as a Conservative. He was defeated by the Liberal candidate, Francis A. Walker, and retired from politics.

== Electoral record ==
1898 North-West Territories general election: Victoria
Party	Candidate	Votes	%
Independent	John William Shera	242	52.27
Independent	Frank Fraser Tims	221	47.73
Total valid votes		463	100.00
Source(s) "North-West Territories: Council and Legislative Assembly, 1876-1905" (PDF). Saskatchewan Archives. Archived from the original (PDF) on 2007-09-28.

1902 North-West Territories general election: Victoria
Party	Candidate	Votes	%	±%
Independent	John William Shera	424	66.15	+13.88
Independent	Gus Doze	217	33.85	
Total valid votes		641	100.00	
Source(s) "North-West Territories: Council and Legislative Assembly, 1876-1905" (PDF). Saskatchewan Archives. Archived from the original (PDF) on 2007-09-28.

1905 Alberta general election: Victoria
Party	Candidate	Votes	%
Liberal	Francis A. Walker	949	69.88
Conservative	John William Shera	409	30.12
Total valid votes		1,358	
Liberal pickup new district.			
Source(s) "Results for Victoria". Heritage Community Foundation. Archived from the original on 2010-12-08.
