= Vermilion-Viking =

Defunct provincial electoral district in Alberta, Canada

Alberta electoral district

Defunct provincial electoral district
- Legislature: Legislative Assembly of Alberta
- District created: 1971
- District abolished: 1993
- First contested: 1971
- Last contested: 1989

Vermilion-Viking was a provincial electoral district in Alberta, Canada, mandated to return a single member to the Legislative Assembly of Alberta using first past the post method of voting from 1971 to 1993.

Vermilion-Viking is named for the towns of Vermilion and Viking.

== Members of the Legislative Assembly (MLAs) ==
Members of the Legislative Assembly for Vermilion-Viking
Assembly	Years	Member	Party
See Vermilion electoral district from 1905-1971
17th	1971–1975	Ashley H. Cooper	Social Credit
18th	1975–1979	Tom Lysons	Progressive Conservative
19th	1979–1982	Tom Lysons	Progressive Conservative
20th	1982–1986	Tom Lysons	Progressive Conservative
21st	1986–1989	Steve West	Progressive Conservative
22nd	1989–1993	Steve West	Progressive Conservative
See Vermilion-Lloydminster electoral district from 1993-2019 and Vegreville-Viking electoral district from 1993-2004

== Electoral history ==
=== 1971 ===
1971 Alberta general election
Party	Candidate	Votes	%	±%
Social Credit	Ashley H. Cooper	2,420	46.91%	–
Progressive Conservative	Tom Newcomb	2,232	43.26%	–
New Democratic	Harry Yaremchuk	507	9.83%	–
Total		5,159	–	–
Rejected, spoiled and declined		25	–	–
Eligible electors / turnout		6,623	78.27%	–
Social Credit pickup new district.				
Source(s) Source: "Vermilion-Viking Official Results 1971 Alberta general election". Alberta Heritage Community Foundation.

=== 1975 ===
1975 Alberta general election
Party	Candidate	Votes	%	±%
Progressive Conservative	Tom Lysons	2,731	54.36%	11.09%
Social Credit	Angus MacMillan	1,274	25.36%	-21.55%
New Democratic	Ken Jaremco	1,019	20.28%	10.46%
Total		5,024	–	–
Rejected, spoiled and declined		24	–	–
Eligible electors / turnout		6,630	76.14%	–
Progressive Conservative gain from Social Credit		Swing		12.68%
Source(s) Source: "Vermilion-Viking Official Results 1975 Alberta general election". Alberta Heritage Community Foundation.

=== 1979 ===
1979 Alberta general election
Party	Candidate	Votes	%	±%
Progressive Conservative	Tom Lysons	3,292	51.65%	-2.71%
Social Credit	Doug Livingstone	2,087	32.74%	7.38%
New Democratic	Grant Bergman	877	13.76%	-6.52%
Liberal	Ralph A. Wilson	118	1.85%	–
Total		6,374	–	–
Rejected, spoiled and declined		N/A	–	–
Eligible electors / turnout		8,972	71.04%	–
Progressive Conservative hold		Swing		-5.05%
Source(s) Source: "Vermilion-Viking Official Results 1979 Alberta general election". Alberta Heritage Community Foundation.

=== 1982 ===
1982 Alberta general election
Party	Candidate	Votes	%	±%
Progressive Conservative	Tom Lysons	4,357	58.38%	6.73%
Western Canada Concept	Richard Van Ee	1,742	23.34%	–
New Democratic	Grant Bergman	1,205	16.15%	2.39%
Social Credit	Patrick (Pat) Moore	159	2.13%	-30.61%
Total		7,463	–	–
Rejected, spoiled and declined		23	–	–
Eligible electors / turnout		9,475	79.01%	–
Progressive Conservative hold		Swing		8.07%
Source(s) Source: "Vermilion-Viking Official Results 1982 Alberta general election". Alberta Heritage Community Foundation.

=== 1986 ===
1986 Alberta general election
Party	Candidate	Votes	%	±%
Progressive Conservative	Steve West	4,228	71.67%	13.29%
New Democratic	Mervin Stephenson	1,671	28.33%	12.18%
Total		5,899	–	–
Rejected, spoiled and declined		26	–	–
Eligible electors / turnout		10,963	54.05%	–
Progressive Conservative hold		Swing		4.15%
Source(s) Source: "Vermilion-Viking Official Results 1986 Alberta general election". Alberta Heritage Community Foundation.

=== 1989 ===
1989 Alberta general election
Party	Candidate	Votes	%	±%
Progressive Conservative	Steve West	4,086	63.68%	-7.99%
Liberal	Greg Michaud	1,252	19.51%	–
New Democratic	Grant Bergman	1,078	16.80%	-11.53%
Total		6,416	–	–
Rejected, spoiled and declined		25	–	–
Eligible electors / turnout		10,711	60.13%	–
Progressive Conservative hold		Swing		0.41%
Source(s) Source: "Vermilion-Viking Official Results 1989 Alberta general election". Alberta Heritage Community Foundation.

== See also ==
- List of Alberta provincial electoral districts
- Canadian provincial electoral districts
