= William R. Cornish =

Canadian politician

Member of the Legislative Assembly of Alberta
- In office 1944–1955
- Preceded by: William Fallow
- Succeeded by: Russell Whitson
- Constituency: Vermilion

Personal details
- Born: March 2, 1890 Kingsbridge, Devon, England, United Kingdom
- Died: December 29, 1969 (aged 79) Alberta, Canada
- Party: Social Credit

William Rich Cornish (March 2, 1890 – December 29, 1969) was a provincial politician from Alberta, Canada. He served as a member of the Legislative Assembly of Alberta from 1944 to 1955, sitting with the Social Credit caucus in government.
