= William Fedun =

Canadian politician

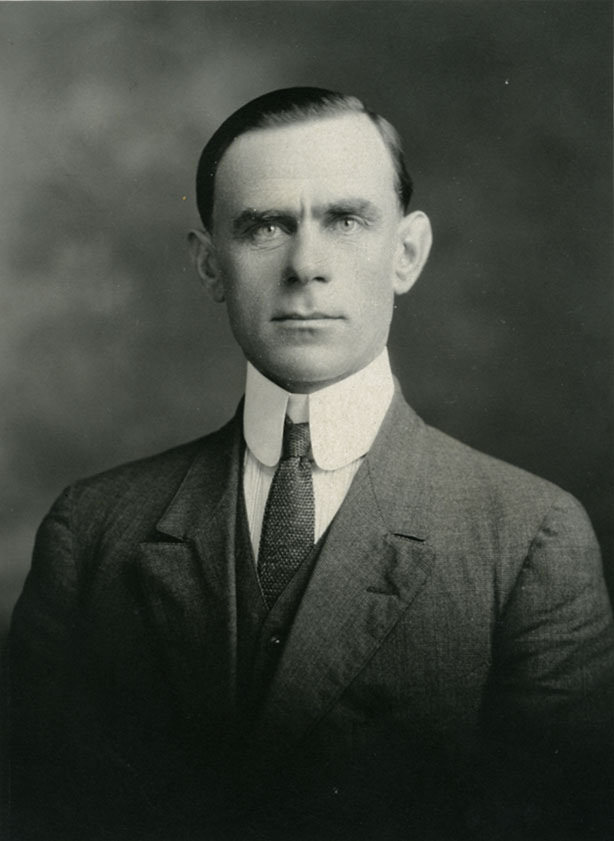
- Fedun circa 1921–26

Member of the Legislative Assembly of Alberta
- In office 1921–1926
- Preceded by: Francis Walker
- Succeeded by: Rudolph Hennig
- Constituency: Victoria

Personal details
- Born: August 5, 1879 Zavydche, Chervonohrad Raion, Eastern Galicia, Austria-Hungary
- Died: November 14, 1949 (aged 70) Lamont, Alberta, Canada
- Party: United Farmers of Alberta
- Occupation: farmer

Wasyl "William" Fedun (August 5, 1879 – November 14, 1949) was a Member of the Legislative Assembly of Alberta, Canada from 1921 to 1926.

He was born in Eastern Galicia.

William Fedun was elected to the northern Alberta, Victoria provincial electoral district in the 1921 Alberta general election for the United Farmers of Alberta. He defeated long time Liberal MLA Francis Walker who was one of the last original members in the provincial legislature.

He served one full term in office as a backbencher in the United Farmers government.

Fedun did not run again in 1926

He died in 1949 in Lamont, Alberta and was buried in Andrew, Alberta.
