= Archibald Campbell (Alberta politician) =

Canadian politician

Member of the Legislative Assembly of Alberta
- In office 1909–1910
- Preceded by: James Bismark Holden
- Succeeded by: Arthur Lewis Sifton
- Constituency: Vermilion

Personal details
- Born: January 18, 1862
- Died: November 4, 1943 (aged 81)
- Party: Liberal

Archibald Campbell (18 January 1862 – 4 November 1943) was a politician from Alberta, Canada.

Campbell was elected to the Legislative Assembly of Alberta in the 1909 Alberta general election. He defeated Conservative party candidate A.R. Aldridge in a landslide victory.

Campbell resigned his seat on 8 June 1910 to provide an electoral district for Premier Arthur Lewis Sifton to run in.

Legislative Assembly of Alberta
Preceded by James Bismark Holden	MLA Vermilion; 1909–1910	Succeeded by Arthur Lewis Sifton
