= Samuel Calvert =

Canadian politician (1867–1956)

Samuel Wesley Calvert
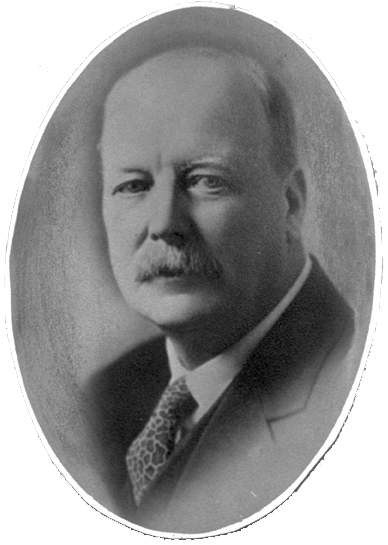

Member of the Legislative Assembly of Alberta
- In office August 22, 1935 – March 21, 1940
- Preceded by: Peter Miskew
- Succeeded by: District abolished
- Constituency: Victoria

Personal details
- Born: September 16, 1867 Caledon, Ontario
- Died: March 11, 1956 (aged 88) Edmonton, Alberta
- Party: Social Credit
- Occupation: soldier and politician

Military service
- Allegiance: Canada
- Branch/service: Non-Permanent Active Militia
- Rank: Corporal
- Unit: 19th Alberta Dragoons

Samuel Wesley Calvert (September 16, 1867 – March 11, 1956) was a soldier and politician. He was mayor of Chipman, Alberta, and as a member of the Legislative Assembly of Alberta from 1935 to 1940 sitting with the Social Credit caucus in government.

== Early life ==
Calvert was a corporal in the 19th Alberta Dragoons, a cavalry regiment of the Non-Permanent Active Militia.

== Political career ==
Calvert began his political career by serving as Mayor of Chipman, Alberta.

Calvert ran for a seat in the legislature in the 1935 Alberta general election as a Social Credit candidate in the electoral district of Victoria. He defeated three other candidates with a large majority to pick up the seat for his party.

Calvert did not run for a second term and retired at dissolution of the assembly in 1940.
