= Rudolph Hennig =

Canadian politician

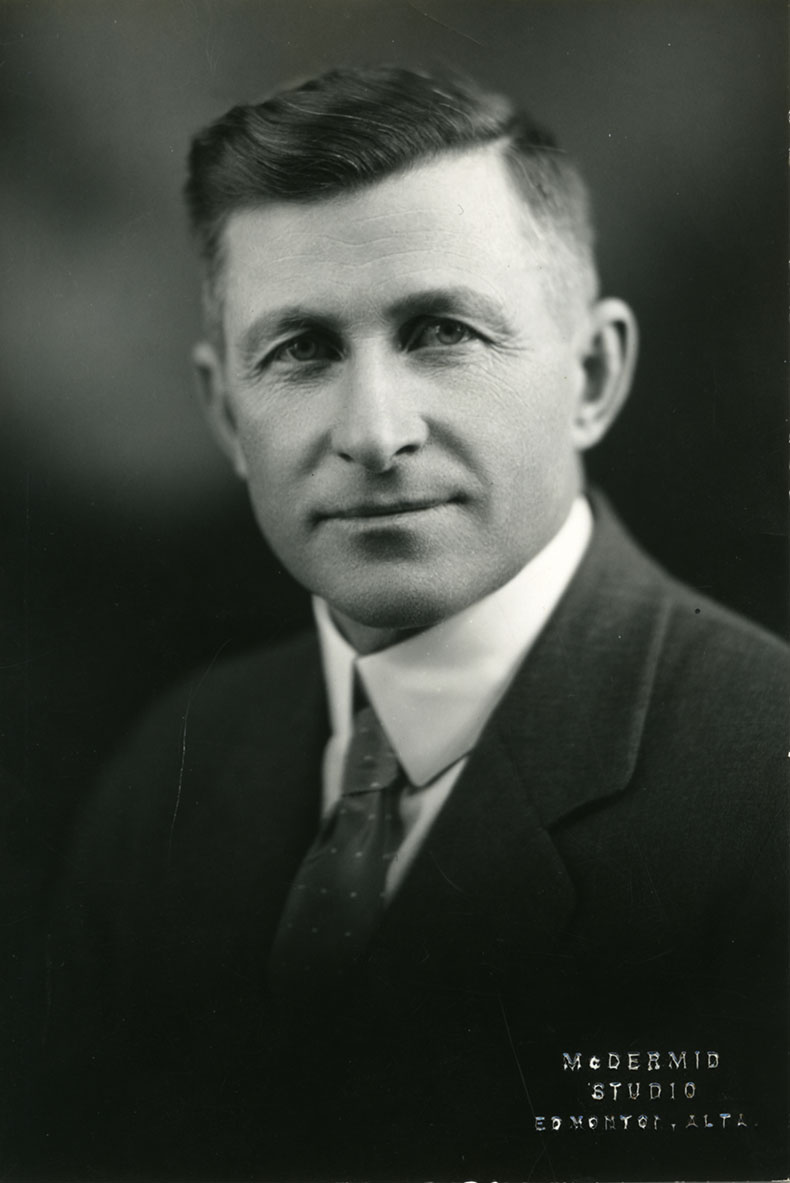

Member of the Legislative Assembly of Alberta
- In office June 28, 1926 – June 19, 1930
- Preceded by: William Fedun
- Succeeded by: Peter Miskew
- Constituency: Victoria
- In office June 19, 1930 – August 22, 1935
- Preceded by: New District
- Succeeded by: Floyd Baker
- Constituency: Clover Bar

Personal details
- Born: May 4, 1886 Kishinev, Russian Empire (now Chișinău, Moldova)
- Died: February 28, 1969 (aged 82) Edmonton, Alberta, Canada
- Party: United Farmers
- Occupation: politician

Rudolph Hennig (May 5, 1886 – February 28, 1969) was a politician from Alberta, Canada. He served in the Legislative Assembly of Alberta from 1926 to 1935 as a member of the United Farmers of Alberta.

== Political career ==
Hennig first ran for the Legislative Assembly of Alberta in the 1926 Alberta general election. He stood as the United Farmers candidate in the electoral district of Victoria. He defeated former Liberal MLA Francis Walker and three other candidates.

Upon redistribution of districts in 1930, Hennig sought re-election in the new district of Clover Bar in that year's election. He defeated independent candidate Christian Hein in the second vote count.

Shortly before the 1935 election, he lost the UFA nomination in Clover Bar to David Roberts. He chose to retire at dissolution of the assembly rather than contesting the election as an independent.

== Honors ==
The University of Alberta awarded Hennig an honorary degree in 1965. École Rudolph Hennig School, a French immersion elementary and Junior High School in Fort Saskatchewan, Alberta, was named in his honor.
