= Frank Fraser Tims =

Canadian politician

Member of the North-West Legislative Assembly for Victoria
- In office 1894–1898
- Preceded by: New District
- Succeeded by: Jack Shera

Personal details
- Born: February 8, 1856 Berlin, Canada West
- Died: 1949 (aged 92–93)

Frank Fraser Tims (February 8, 1856 – 1949) was a Canadian politician. He served on the North-West Legislative Assembly for Victoria from 1894 to 1898.

== Early life ==
Frank Fraser Tims was born on February 8, 1856, in Berlin, Ontario to Frank D. Tims, the Deputy Provincial Auditor for the Province of Quebec and Caroline Dudley Fraser, one of 13 children. Tims moved to Manitoba in 1882, and Alberta in 1887. Tims was the first person to erect a building in Regina, a frame store, which he expanded to swift current.

== Political life ==
Tims contested the 1894 North-West Territories general election in the Victoria electoral district, winning the seat by acclamation. Tims was defeated in the following 1898 North-West Territories general election by Jack Shera, collecting 221 votes to Shera's 242.

Tims also served on the Fort Saskatchewan School Board.

== Later life ==
Tims moved from Fort Saskatchewan to Edmonton and began working in real estate and insurance.

== Election results ==
1894 North-West Territories general election: Victoria
Party	Candidate	Votes
Independent	Frank Fraser Tims	Acclaimed
Total valid votes		0
Source(s) "North-West Territories: Council and Legislative Assembly, 1876-1905" (PDF). Saskatchewan Archives. Archived from the original (PDF) on 2007-09-28.

1898 North-West Territories general election: Victoria
Party	Candidate	Votes	%
Independent	John William Shera	242	52.27
Independent	Frank Fraser Tims	221	47.73
Total valid votes		463	100.00
Source(s) "North-West Territories: Council and Legislative Assembly, 1876-1905" (PDF). Saskatchewan Archives. Archived from the original (PDF) on 2007-09-28.
