= James Alexander Marshall =

Canadian politician

Member of Parliament for Camrose
- In office 1935–1949
- Preceded by: William Thomas Lucas
- Succeeded by: Hilliard Beyerstein

Personal details
- Born: September 16, 1888 Lurgan, Ireland
- Died: June 30, 1977 (aged 88) Edmonton, Alberta, Canada
- Party: Social Credit Party of Canada
- Spouse(s): Edna Lawrence (m. 15 Jul 1915)
- Children: Margaret Maureen Marshall
- Profession: Secretary, teacher

James Alexander Marshall (September 16, 1888 – June 30, 1977) was a secretary, teacher and a Canadian federal politician. Born in Ireland, Marshall came to Canada in 1912.

Marshall first ran for a seat in the House of Commons of Canada in the 1935 Canadian federal election. He ran as a candidate from the Social Credit Party in the Camrose electoral district. He would go on to defeat incumbent Member of Parliament William Thomas Lucas in a landslide victory to earn his 1st term in office.

Marshall would run for re-election to his second term in the 1940 Canadian federal election, his plurality of votes would be reduced but he still won a comfortable majority. Marshall would win election to his final term in office in the 1945 Canadian federal election, he would retire from politics in 1949. He died in 1977 in Edmonton at a veterans' retirement home.
