= Ashley Cooper (politician) =

Canadian politician

Ashley Horace Cooper

Member of the Legislative Assembly of Alberta
- In office June 18, 1959 – August 30, 1971
- Preceded by: Russell Whitson
- Constituency: Vermilion
- In office August 30, 1971 – March 25, 1975
- Succeeded by: Tom Lysons
- Constituency: Vermilion-Viking

Personal details
- Born: February 6, 1905
- Died: December 13, 1981 (aged 76)
- Party: Social Credit
- Occupation: politician

Ashley Horace Cooper (February 6, 1905 – December 13, 1981) was a provincial politician from Alberta, Canada. He served as a member of the Legislative Assembly of Alberta from 1959 to 1975 sitting with the Social Credit caucus in both government and opposition.

== Political career ==
Cooper ran for a seat to the Alberta Legislature as a Social Credit candidate for the first time in the 1955 Alberta general election. He ran in a hotly contested race in the electoral district of Vermilion against Liberal candidate Russell Whitson and two other candidates. Cooper initially lead the race on the first vote count, but fell behind in the third count losing to Whitson by 20 votes.

Cooper and Whitson faced each other for the second time in the 1959 Alberta general election. This time Cooper won defeating Whitson and two other candidates by a wide margin. He ran for a second term in office in the 1963 general election and won a larger majority to keep his seat.

Cooper ran for a third term in office in the 1967 general election. He defeated two other candidates polling another strong popular vote.

Due to boundary redistribution in 1971, the electoral district of Vermilion became Vermilion-Viking. Cooper ran for his fourth term in the new district in the 1971 general election. He faced a tough fight to keep his seat from Progressive Conservative candidate Tom Newcomb who finished just 200 votes behind Cooper.

Cooper retired from provincial politics at dissolution of the assembly in 1975.
