= Russell Whitson =

Canadian politician

Russell James Whitson

Member of the Legislative Assembly of Alberta
- In office June 29, 1955 – June 18, 1959
- Preceded by: William Cornish
- Succeeded by: Ashley Cooper
- Constituency: Vermilion

Personal details
- Born: September 23, 1914
- Died: April 29, 1996 (aged 81)
- Party: Liberal
- Occupation: politician

Russell James Whitson (September 23, 1914 - April 29, 1996) was a provincial politician from Alberta, Canada. He served as a member of the Legislative Assembly of Alberta from 1955 to 1959 sitting with the Liberal caucus in opposition.

== Political career ==
Whitson ran for a seat to the Alberta Legislature as a Liberal candidate in the electoral district of Vermilion for the 1955 Alberta general election. He trailed significantly behind Social Credit candidate Ashley Cooper on the first vote count. The election went two more counts allowing Whitson to come from behind and defeat Cooper by 20 votes to pick up the seat for his party.

Whitson ran for a second term in office in the 1959 Alberta general election. He faced Cooper for the second time and was defeated finishing a distant second place in the four way race.
