= William Fallow =

Canadian politician

William A. Fallow
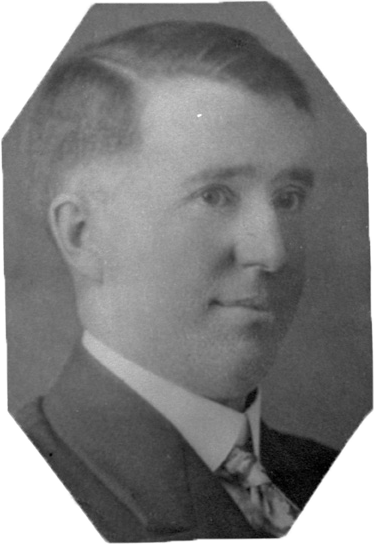

Member of the Legislative Assembly of Alberta
- In office 1944–1948
- Preceded by: Joseph Tremblay
- Succeeded by: John Barrett Wood
- Constituency: Grouard
- In office 1944–1948
- Preceded by: Richard Gavin Reid
- Succeeded by: William R. Cornish
- Constituency: Vermilion

Personal details
- Born: October 7, 1883 Broadview, Saskatchewan
- Died: May 3, 1948 (aged 64) Edmonton, Alberta
- Party: Social Credit

William Allen Fallow (October 7, 1883 – May 3, 1948) was a provincial politician from Alberta, Canada. He served as a member of the Legislative Assembly of Alberta from 1935 to his death in 1948, sitting with the Social Credit caucus in government. From September 3, 1935 to his death, he served as the Minister of Public Works in the Aberhart/Manning governments. He died at an Edmonton hospital, still in office, after a stroke on May 3, 1948.
