= Victoria (territorial electoral district) =

Former territorial electoral district in the North-West Territories, Canada

Northwest Territories electoral district

Defunct territorial electoral district
- Legislature: Legislative Assembly of the Northwest Territories
- District created: 1894
- District abolished: 1905
- First contested: 1894
- Last contested: 1902

Victoria was a former territorial electoral district that was mandated to return a single member to the North-West Legislative Assembly from 1894 until Alberta became a province in 1905.

== Geography ==
The electoral district was named for Fort Victoria on the North Saskatchewan River. It covered the section of the District of Alberta north and east of Edmonton, including the village of Fort Saskatchewan.

== Members of the Legislative Assembly (MLAs) ==
Members of the Legislative Assembly for Victoria
Assembly	Years	Member|	Party
See Edmonton 1883-1894
3rd	1894–1898	Frank Fraser Tims	Independent
4th	1898–1902	Jack Shera	Independent
5th	1902–1905	Jack Shera	Independent
See Victoria (Alberta) and Sturgeon 1905–1940

Victoria elected Frank Fraser Tims as its representative in the 1894 election, who was then defeated by Jack Shera in 1898. Both were independents, as there were no political parties in these elections, and the territory was governed by consensus. When the Dominion parties were introduced in 1902, Shera remained an independent and was elected to a second term.

He sought re-election in the modified Victoria district after Alberta was created in 1905 as a Conservative, but was soundly defeated.

== Election results ==
1894 North-West Territories general election
Party	Candidate	Votes
Independent	Frank Fraser Tims	Acclaimed
Total valid votes		0
Source(s) "North-West Territories: Council and Legislative Assembly, 1876-1905" (PDF). Saskatchewan Archives. Archived from the original (PDF) on 28 September 2007.

1898 North-West Territories general election
Party	Candidate	Votes	%
Independent	John William Shera	242	52.27
Independent	Frank Fraser Tims	221	47.73
Total valid votes		463	100.00
Source(s) "North-West Territories: Council and Legislative Assembly, 1876-1905" (PDF). Saskatchewan Archives. Archived from the original (PDF) on 28 September 2007.

1902 North-West Territories general election
Party	Candidate	Votes	%	±%
Independent	John William Shera	424	66.15	+13.88
Independent	Gus Doze	217	33.85	
Total valid votes		641	100.00	
Source(s) "North-West Territories: Council and Legislative Assembly, 1876-1905" (PDF). Saskatchewan Archives. Archived from the original (PDF) on 28 September 2007.

== See also ==
- List of Northwest Territories territorial electoral districts
- Canadian provincial electoral districts
