= Victoria (Alberta federal electoral district) =

Former federal electoral district in Alberta, Canada

Alberta electoral district

Defunct federal electoral district
- Legislature: House of Commons
- District created: 1907
- District abolished: 1925
- First contested: 1908
- Last contested: 1921

Victoria was a federal electoral district in Alberta, Canada, that was represented in the House of Commons of Canada from 1908 to 1925. This riding was created in 1907, two years after Alberta was created as a province, from parts of Edmonton and Strathcona ridings. It took its name from the Victoria Settlement on the banks of the North Saskatchewan River. When first created, it was huge, covering most of the northeast quadrant of the province of Alberta.

The Victoria riding was abolished in 1924 when it was redistributed into Battle River, Camrose, and two newly created ridings, Vegreville and Wetaskiwin.

== Members of Parliament ==
Victoria
Parliament	Years	Member	Party
District created from Edmonton and Strathcona
11th	1908–1911	William Henry White	Liberal
12th	1911–1917	William Henry White	Liberal
13th	1917–1921	William Henry White	Opposition (Laurier Liberals)
14th	1921–1925	William Thomas Lucas	United Farmers
District redistributed into Battle River, Camrose, Vegreville and Wetaskiwin

== Election results ==
1921 Canadian federal election
Party	Candidate	Votes	%	±%
United Farmers of Alberta	William Thomas Lucas	11,402	80.93	–
Liberal	Christopher Fraser Connolly	1,780	12.63	–
Conservative	James Bismark Holden	907	6.44	–37.93
Total valid votes		14,089	100.00	
Total rejected ballots		–		
Turnout		14,089	65.62	–22.24
Eligible voters		21,470		
United Farmers of Alberta gain from Opposition (Laurier Liberals)		Swing		–
Source: Library of Parliament

1917 Canadian federal election
Party	Candidate	Votes	%	±%
Opposition (Laurier Liberals)	William Henry White	3,626	47.71	–0.81
Government (Unionist)	James Bismark Holden	3,372	44.37	–
Independent	John W. Leedy	602	7.92	–
Total valid votes		7,600	100.00	
Total rejected ballots		–		
Turnout		7,600	87.86	+22.40
Eligible voters		8,650		
Opposition (Laurier Liberals) notional hold		Swing		–
Source: Library of Parliament

1911 Canadian federal election
Party	Candidate	Votes	%	±%
Liberal	William Henry White	3,225	48.53	–5.23
Conservative	Frederick Augustus Morrison	2,702	40.66	–5.59
Independent	William James Jackman	719	10.82	–
Total valid votes		6,646	100.00	
Total rejected ballots		–		
Turnout		6,646	65.46	–
Eligible voters		10,152		
Liberal hold		Swing		+5.41
Source: Library of Parliament

1908 Canadian federal election
Party	Candidate	Votes	%
Liberal	William Henry White	2,647	53.76
Conservative	Frederick Augustus Morrison	2,277	46.24
Total valid votes		4,924	100.00
Total rejected ballots		39	
Turnout		4,924	–
Eligible voters		–	
Source: Library of Parliament

== See also ==
- List of Canadian electoral districts
- Historical federal electoral districts of Canada
