= William Henry White (politician) =

Canadian politician

Member of Parliament for Victoria
- In office 1909–1921
- Preceded by: new district
- Succeeded by: William Thomas Lucas

Personal details
- Born: August 21, 1865 City View, Canada West
- Died: June 11, 1930 (aged 64) Fort Saskatchewan, Alberta
- Party: Liberal Party of Canada
- Spouse: Annie Davies
- Occupation: Farmer, police officer

William Henry White (August 21, 1865 – June 11, 1930) was a farmer and a federal politician from northern Alberta, Canada.

White was born in City View, Canada West (present-day Ontario) in 1865 and was educated in local schools (in the Ottawa area). He came west as a member of the Royal North-West Mounted Police in 1881. From 1887 to 1891, he was a homestead inspector. In 1897, he married Annie Davies and had 2 sons and one daughter.
