= United Farmers of Alberta =

Association of Alberta farmers

- Type: Agricultural supply cooperative
- Founded: 1909; 117 years ago
- Headquarters: Calgary, Alberta, Canada
- Key people: Scott Bolton, President & CEO
- Products: Agriculture, Retail, Petroleum, Construction
- Revenue: 1.8 billion CAD (2018)
- Operating income: 77 million CAD (2018)
- Members: 120,000
- Number of employees: 950 (2018)
- Subsidiaries: Spruceland Lumber, Bar-W Petroleum and Electric, Stirdon Betker, Maple Leaf Petroleum
- Website: Official website

The United Farmers of Alberta (UFA) is an association of Alberta farmers that has served different roles in its 100-year history. It has operated as a lobby group, a successful political party, and as a farm-supply retail chain. As a political party, the UFA formed the government of Alberta from 1921 to 1935.

Since 1935, it has primarily been an agricultural supply cooperative headquartered in Calgary, Alberta. As of 2019, UFA operates 34 farm and ranch supply stores in Alberta and over 110 fuel stations in British Columbia, Alberta and Saskatchewan.

== Founding as lobby group ==
UFA was founded in 1909 as a government lobby group following a merger between the Alberta Farmers' Association and Alberta branches of the Canadian Society for Equity. The UFA began as a non-partisan organization whose aim was to be a lobby group promoting the interest of farmers in the province. In 1913, under president William John Tregillus, the UFA successfully pressured Alberta's Liberal government to organize the Alberta Farmers' Cooperative Elevator Company (AFCEC), which joined with other Prairie elevator companies to eventually become the United Grain Growers. Tregillus was the first president of the AFCEC.

The UFA was a believer in the co-operative movement and supported women's suffrage. In 1912 women founded the parallel United Farm Women of Alberta, and in 1914, women were granted full membership rights in UFA itself.

By 1920, UFA had become the most influential lobby group in Alberta with over 30,000 registered members.

== Political history ==
United Farmers of Alberta
- President: Henry Wise Wood (1916–1931)
- Political leaders: Henry Wise Wood (1919–21); Herbert Greenfield (1921–25); John Edward Brownlee (1925–34); Richard Gavin Reid (1934–35)
- Founded: 1919
- Dissolved: 1939
- Preceded by: Alberta Non-Partisan League
- Newspaper: The U.F.A. (1922–1934); The United Farmer (1934–1936)
- Ideology: Social democracy Progressivism; Agrarianism
- National affiliation: Progressive Party of Canada (~ 1920–1930); Co-operative Commonwealth Federation (1935–1939)
- Governed with support of: Alberta Labor Representation League; Dominion Labor Party

=== Entry into politics ===
Under pressure of losing influence to the upstart Alberta Non-Partisan League – which ran in four rural constituencies in the 1917 provincial election, winning two seats – and dissatisfied with the existing political parties, UFA entered the political arena in 1919. Some prominent UFA members (including its president, Henry Wise Wood) at first opposed entering into direct politics, as opposed to lobbying, however, because they thought abandoning the UFA's non-partisan policy would cause the UFA to break up.

In 1919, UFA candidate Alexander Moore won a by-election in the Cochrane constituency. In 1921, Robert Gardiner won a seat in a federal by-election, becoming UFA's first Member of Parliament.

Encouraged by this, UFA ran in 45 of Alberta's 61 ridings in the 1921 provincial election. To the surprise of nearly everyone, including themselves, UFA took 38 seats in the election, winning a majority government, and sweeping the Liberals out of power after almost 16 years. UFA and Progressive party candidates also captured all but two of the Alberta federal seats in the 1921 federal election (the other two were taken by Labour candidates).

=== Majority governments ===
As was the case with other United Farmer governments in Manitoba and Ontario, the UFA was elected unexpectedly and without a leader. To form its cabinet it went outside the Legislature to recruit a Premier, as did the other United Farmer governments. The UFA even approached Liberal leader Charles Stewart to remain as premier. Stewart declined, however, not wanting to lead the assembly as a member of the opposition. UFA President Henry Wise Wood also declined, and Vice-President Percival Baker, an elected MLA, died 24 hours after the election. Ultimately, UFA executive member Herbert Greenfield was named the first UFA Premier. Among his cabinet were Irene Parlby, the second female cabinet minister in the British Empire, and Calgary Labour Party MLA Alex Ross as Minister of Public Works.

The United Farmers government initiated several reforms, including improving medical care, broadening labour rights and making the tax system fairer. It made good on its promise of electoral reform, bringing in a measure of proportional representation through the STV. In 1923, the government formed the Alberta Wheat Pool and upset some of its support base by ending Prohibition, replacing it with open sale of alcohol through government-owned liquor stores and carefully regulated beer parlours, and refusing to establish a provincial bank, a bank owned by the provincial government, despite UFA conventions calling for it.

In 1925, John E. Brownlee, who was already widely believed to be the "true" leader of the United Farmers, succeeded Greenfield as Premier. Brownlee led the party to a second majority government in the 1926 election.

In 1929, after years of negotiating, Brownlee gained control over Alberta's natural resources. This was a right other provinces were granted at Confederation or upon entry into Confederation, but which Alberta and Saskatchewan were denied when they became provinces in 1905, instead receiving a yearly cash subsidy from the federal government. This deal would later become a critical factor in Alberta's economic success as the province's oil deposits were exploited.

Riding a wave of popularity resulting from this agreement, Brownlee led the United Farmers to a third majority government in the 1930 election. This was despite alienating socialists and labour groups as he led the party in a conservative fashion, and despite the quickly deteriorating financial conditions.

=== Decline ===
The Great Depression had a critical impact on the United Farmers' fortunes, as the crash in grain prices and simultaneous drought in southern Alberta hurt its support base, farmers. The government, with reduced tax revenue, engaged in cuts in services, staff and wages. The province was in debt after the grandiose spending of the relatively prosperous 1920s. The government also bailed out the hard-pressed Alberta Wheat Pool in 1929. Banks were repossessing the farms of many farmers who were unable to pay off their loans and interest when grain prices were lower than the cost of production. The government's Liberal and Conservative opponents grew louder and they hoped to become popular. At the same time, however, the government faced opposition from socialists calling for more interventionist anti-capitalist policies and for radical monetary reform. The latter stance was supported by William Aberhart's Social Credit movement, which in 1933–35 grew to a potent force among the province's farmers.

Henry Wise Wood retired as president of the UFA, more-radical-minded UFA MP Robert Gardiner, a member of the Ginger Group became president; the UFA conventions passed increased calls for strong government measures to address the province's widespread poverty; the UFA joined with the Canadian Labour Party and other political groups to help found the Co-operative Commonwealth Federation, the first Canada-wide farmer/labour political party (other than the revolutionary Communist Party of Canada). Premier Brownlee on more than one occasion opposed the UFA's leftward slide. The final blow for Brownlee occurred when he was caught up in a sex scandal as he was accused of seducing a young clerk working in the Attorney General's office. Brownlee resigned in disgrace in July 1934.

Richard G. Reid succeeded Brownlee as Premier, however with many voters jumping to the new Social Credit Party, the United Farmers' fall in politics was as rapid as its rise. The party was wiped off the political map in the 1935 election, losing all of its seats and tallying only 11 percent of the vote.

Of the nine UFA MPs elected in the 1930 federal election, eight joined the Cooperative Commonwealth Federation after it was formed in 1932. All eight ran as CCF candidates in the 1935 federal election and were defeated by a Social Credit landslide. The ninth UFA MP, William Thomas Lucas of Camrose, ran as a Conservative and was also defeated by the Socreds.

Two years after the UFA government was defeated, the organization withdrew from electoral politics. In 1938, the CCF committed itself to run candidates in the next provincial and elections, setting up local riding clubs for that purpose. In 1939, UFA officially disbanded its political arm, still continuing as a farmers supply co-operative. Many of the left-wing members of the UFA organization joined the CCF, though that party would not win the support of most former UFA voters. Many right-wing and centrist members of the UFA joined the Alberta Unity Movement, an attempt to form a coalition between United Farmers, Liberals and Conservatives to defeat Social Credit in the 1940 provincial election.

The CCF was folded into the New Democratic Party in 1961. Its Alberta wing claims the Alberta CCF's history as its own, thus making it a linear descendant of the UFA.

== Federal politics ==
The United Farmers of Alberta ran candidates in several federal elections in alignment with, but usually to the left of, the Progressive Party of Canada; further, a number of UFA MPs sat in the House of Commons with the Ginger Group of left wing MPs.

Following Robert Gardiner's election in a federal by-election prior to the 1921 election, Alberta farmers ran 14 candidates (some as UFA, some as Progressive Party candidates) in the 1921 federal election; they did not run in two Calgary ridings where strong Labour candidates carried the farmer-worker banner. All the UFA candidates (and the two Calgary Labour candidates) were elected, the incumbent Liberal MPs and Conservative contenders not getting one seat. In 1926, the province's Progressive MPs ran for re-election as UFA candidates. Eight of the UFA's nine remaining MPs joined the Co-operative Commonwealth Federation when it was formed in 1932. All eight ran as CCF candidates in the 1935 federal election; they were defeated. The ninth, William Thomas Lucas, ran as a Conservative in 1935 and was also defeated by the Social Credit landslide that were elections in Alberta that year.

=== Federal election results ===
Election	# of candidates nominated	# of seats won	# of total votes	% of national popular vote
1921	2	2	22,251	0.71%
1925	2	2	8,053	0.26%
1926	12	11	60,740	1.837%
1930	10	9	56,968	1.46%

=== UFA MPs ===
- George Gibson Coote – accountant, Macleod, Alberta – elected as Progressive 1921, 1925, UFA 1926, 1930, (def as CCF 1935)
- Robert Gardiner – farmer, Acadia, Alberta – elected as Progressive 1921, 1925, UFA 1926, 1930, (def as CCF 1935)
- Ted Garland – farmer, Bow River, Alberta – elected as Progressive 1921–1925, UFA 1926–1930, (def as CCF 1935)
- William Irvine – author, clergyman, farmer, worker – elected in East Calgary as Labour 1921, (def 1925), elected as UFA in Wetaskiwin, Alberta 1926, 1930, (def as CCF 1935)
- Lincoln Henry Jelliff, Lethbridge, AB, elected as Progressive 1921, 1925, UFA 1926
- Donald Ferdinand Kellner, Edmonton East, AB, elected as Progressive 1921, (def 1925), UFA 1926 (def. 1930)
- Donald MacBeth Kennedy – farmer, Peace River, Alberta – elected as Progressive 1921, 1925, UFA 1926, 1930 (def as CCF 1935)
- William Thomas Lucas – farmer, Victoria – elected as UFA 1921 Camrose 1925, 1926, 1930 (def as Conservative 1935)
- Michael Luchkovich – teacher, Vegreville, Alberta – elected as UFA 1926, 1930, (def as CCF 1935)
- Alfred Speakman – farmer, Red Deer, Alberta – elected as UFA 1921, 1925, 1926, 1930 (def as CCF 1935)
- Henry Elvins Spencer – farmer, printer, publisher, Battle River, Alberta – elected as Progressive 1921, 1925, UFA 1926, 1930 (def as CCF 1935)

== The modern cooperative ==
Following the dissolution of its political wing, UFA focused on its commercial operations. UFA entered into a partnership with Maple Leaf Fuels, a subsidiary of Imperial Oil in 1935 to distribute fuel to its members. The next year it began to open retail stations under the Maple Leaf brand across the province.

The first farm supply store opened in Calgary in 1954, and a second in Edmonton in 1957. That same year, UFA bought the assets of Maple Leaf Fuels, giving the co-op greater control over the business.

In 1984, UFA opened its first cardlock fuel agency in Calgary. Today, UFA has over 110 cardlock facilities across three provinces and was the largest cardlock network in Alberta.

UFA has over 120,000 members; further, with 2007 revenues of over $1.8 billion, UFA is ranked as the 37th largest business in Alberta by revenue according to Alberta Venture magazine.

In March 2009, UFA purchased Wholesale Sports in western Canada, and 15 Sportsman's Warehouse locations throughout the Northwest United States, which it then re-branded as Wholesale Sports.

== Locations ==
F/S = Farm & Ranch Supply

P = Petroleum Agency / Cardlock

=== Alberta ===
106: Petro Locations (P) / 34: Farm & Ranch Supply (F/S) / 5: Fertilizer Plants (F/P)

- Alix (P) Closed Summer 2013
- Airdrie (F/S) (P)
- Athabasca (F/S) (P)
- Barrhead (P)
- Bashaw (P)
- Bawlf (P)
- Bay Tree (P)
- Beaverlodge (P)
- Beiseker (P)
- Bow Island (P)
- Brooks (F/S) (P)
- Buck Lake (P)
- Calgary (P)
- Camrose (F/S) (P)
- Cardston (P)
- Carstairs (P)
- Castor (P)
- Cereal (P)
- Claresholm (F/S) (P)
- CFB Cold Lake (P) Closed Fall 2013
- Consort (F/S) (P)
- Coronation (P)
- Czar (P)
- Delburne (P) Closed in 2017
- Delia (P)
- Dewberry (P)
- Drayton Valley (F/S) (P)
- Drumheller (P)
- Eaglesham (F/P)
- Eckville (P)
- Edgerton (P)
- Edmonton (2xP)
- Edson (P)
- Elk Point (P)
- Fairview (F/S) (P)
- Falher (F/S) (P)
- Forestburg (P)
- Fort Macleod (P)
- Fort Saskatchewan (F/S) (P)
- Fox Creek (P)
- Glendon (P)
- Grande Cache (P)
- Grande Prairie (F/S) (3xP)
- Grimshaw (F/S) (P)
- Hanna (F/S) (P)
- High Level (P)
- High Prairie (P)
- High River (F/S) (P)
- Hines Creek (P)
- Hinton (P)
- Innisfail (P)
- Killam (P)
- La Crete (F/S) (P) (F/P)
- La Glace (P)
- Lac La Biche (P)
- Lacombe (P)
- Leduc (F/S) (P)
- Lethbridge (F/S) (P) (F/P)
- Lloydminster (P)
- Lomond (P)
- Manning (P)
- Mannville (P)
- Mayerthorpe (F/S) (P)
- Medicine Hat (F/S) (P)
- Milk River (P)
- Morinville (P)
- Nanton (P)
- Nobleford (P)
- Olds (F/S) (P)
- Onoway (P)
- Oyen (F/S) (P)
- Peace River (P)
- Picture Butte (P)
- Pincher Creek (P)
- Ponoka (F/S) (P)
- Provost (F/S) (P)
- Red Deer (F/S) (3xP)
- Redcliff (P)
- Rimbey (P)
- Rocky Mountain House (P)
- Rockyford (P) Closed in 2017
- Rycroft (P)
- Sexsmith (F/P)
- Smoky Lake (P)
- Spirit River (P)
- Spruce Grove (F/S) (P)
- St. Paul (F/S) (P)
- Stettler (F/S) (P) (F/P)
- Strathmore (F/S) (P)
- Sylvan Lake (P)
- Taber (F/S) (P)
- Three Hills (P)
- Tofield (P)
- Trochu (F/S) (P)
- Two Hills (F/S) (P)
- Valleyview (P)
- Vegreville (P)
- Vermilion (F/S) (P) (F/P)
- Vulcan (F/S) (P)
- Wabasca (P)
- Wainwright (P)
- Wanham (P) Closed Fall 2013.
- Warburg (P)
- Westlock (F/S) (P)
- Wetaskiwin (P)
- Whitecourt (P)
- Wildwood (P)
- Worsley (P)

=== British Columbia ===
2: Petro Locations (P) / 0: Farm & Ranch Supply (F/S):

- Dawson Creek (P)
- Fort St. John (P)

=== Saskatchewan ===
4: Petro Locations (P) / 0: Farm & Ranch Supply (F/S):

- Macklin (P)
- Kindersley (P)
- Swift Current (P)
- Corman Park (P)

== See also ==
- List of cooperatives
- List of Alberta general elections
- List of Alberta political parties
- List of Progressive/United Farmer MPs
- United Farmers (disambiguation)
- United Farmers of Ontario
- Ginger Group (to which many UFA MPs belonged)
- Progressive Party of Canada
- Alberta Eugenics Board

== Notes ==
Preceded by Alberta Liberal Party	Governing party of Alberta; 1921–1935	Succeeded by Social Credit Party of Alberta
