= Edgerton W. Day =

Canadian politician and pioneer settler (1863–1919)

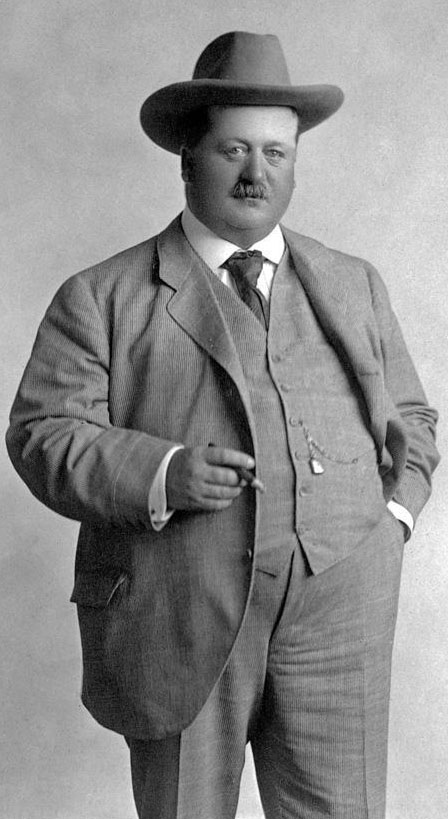
- E. W. Day, c. 1908

Mayor of Daysland
- In office April 2, 1907 – November 1, 1910
- Preceded by: office created
- Succeeded by: Daniel Rabbitt

Personal details
- Born: Edgerton Winnett Day; November 26, 1863 Inverary, Canada West
- Died: February 11, 1919 (aged 55) Edmonton, Alberta, Canada
- Resting place: Edmonton Cemetery
- Party: Conservative
- Spouse: Alexanderina "Ina" Sutherland (m. 1886; died 1914)
- Children: Elsie Margaret (1889–1975); Ina Ansley (1891–1987); George Sutherland (1894–1985); Edgerton Jr. "Ted" (1901–1982)

Edgerton Winnett Day (November 26, 1863 – February 11, 1919) was a Canadian politician and pioneer settler in the area that became the Canadian province of Alberta.

Born in 1863 in Canada West, Day completed his education, and took up a job as a stagecoach driver. Soon after, he would find employment at the Massey-Harris company, an agricultural equipment manufacturer. During this time, Day first surveyed the land that he would eventually settle later on in his life. After briefly working as a loan company, Day moved to the west, after having aspirations of doing so since his youth. As the Canadian Pacific Railway gained entitlement to a portion of land in the prairies, Day became interested in purchasing a large portion, and did so in 1904. He then completed plans for what would later become the town that bears his name, Daysland, in present-day Flagstaff County, Alberta.

Daysland was formed in 1905, when the railway line to the area was completed. Soon after, a large colonial-style house was built as a home for Day and his wife. Fitted with the latest appliances and technology at the time, it soon became the centre of the town, serving as an ice rink and tennis court, and hosting events, including auctions. After the opening of a post office in 1907, Daysland was officially incorporated as a town, with Day elected its first mayor. He would continue to serve in the capacity until his resignation in 1910. Two years later, Day moved to Edmonton, where he served as a major in the Army Reserve until his death from a long illness in 1919.

== Early life and career ==
Day was born in Inverary, Ontario, to Dr. Louis E. and Harriet Ansley Day, of Scottish descent. His father, Louis owned a hotel in Inverary. He completed his education in Inverary, and got his first job as a stage driver on the run between Inverary and Kingston. Day then worked for the Massey-Harris company, starting as an office worker, eventually becoming chief clerk, before resigning after 11 years with the company. Day then took a job as the general manager of the Globe Loan company in Toronto.

After "always longing to go to the west", Day came to the area that would become Daysland in 1888 while he was with the Massey-Harris company, but moved back to Ontario shortly after. When the Canadian Pacific Railway gained entitlement to the land in 1901, Day became interested in purchasing a large section of it. In 1903, as managing director of the Alberta Land Corporation, Day asked J. A. O'Neil of Wetaskiwin to guide him in purchasing sections of land. In 1904, he moved his family to the Wetaskiwin area and acquired 12 townships (116,483 acres) and the mineral rights from the Canadian Pacific Railway in the area for three quarters of a million dollars as one of the "largest individual land purchases in the West". Day, along with about 30 other businessmen walked or drove from Wetaskiwin to survey the homesteads in preparation for the construction of Daysland.

Prior to the foundation of the town, the Alberta Central Land Company, Daysland Trading Company, Board of Trade, and retail merchants were tasked with colonizing the area of what would become Daysland, and creating a town. After Alberta became a province, Day registered plans for the future site of Daysland in the Land Department office of the Canadian Pacific Railway in September 1905. This helped decide the route for the railway.

== Daysland ==
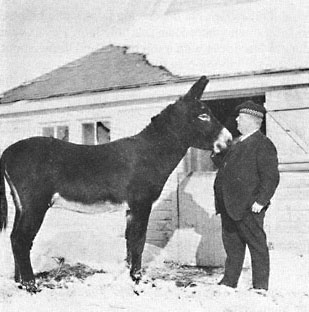
Day and his Spanish jack, Carnot in 1907

The town was founded on October 1, 1905. The next day, the first freight arrived via a construction train, marking the start of the construction of the town. The railway was completed on December 2, 1905, setting the way for homesteaders and settlers. The first building erected was a large colonial-style house, contracted by Henry Nelson. Day and his wife, Ina lived in a "cold shack" from March to June 1906, when their own house was completed. Their property took up 16 lots on George Street and Mitchell Avenue, and was situated in between two churches. It had a "large landscaped yard and lawn, a large hip-roof barn and a windmill". The rooms were described as "spacious, ceilings high", containing up-to-date appliances, such as a hot water heater and refrigerators. The yard was enclosed and used as a skating rink during winters beginning in 1907, a tennis court was installed in 1909 and it was the home for and auctions were hosted by Day. Day owned a farm on the property, which he named Inverary Stock Farm, after his birthplace. On the farm, he raised mules and purebred Ayreshire bulls to contribute to the dairy industry. He also owned purebred stallions, and a Spanish jack, named Carnots, which he kept in his barn. The town had rapidly progressed from its inception in 1905 to a village by April 2, 1906.

A post office opened in September 1906, and Daysland was officially incorporated as a town on April 2, 1907, with Day acclaimed as the first mayor, and the first council was elected, consisting of C. A. MacLoed, James Stacey Orr, H. Bentley, S. V. B. Crowell, G. Wardstrom, J. E. Vanderburgh, and E. H. Dawson as secretary and treasurer. A district court began regularly sitting in the area in April 1907. The Daysland Post, a local newspaper, began publication in May 1907, and funding for a hospital was also raised. This caused Day, on behalf of the Board of Trade to travel to Kingston, Ontario and extend an invitation to the members of the Sisters of Providence to settle in the town. The Sisters later went on to establish a 3-storey, 25-bed hospital along with living accommodations for the staff. Also in 1907, a display of the town was arranged to be presented at the Dominion Fair in Calgary. In a 1907 article, Day was quoted as saying about Daysland, "I have no hesitation in recommending this part of the country for young men to locate in. It is a fine country and the young man with ambition is bound to succeed."

Day ran in the 1908 Canadian federal election as a Conservative candidate for the riding of Strathcona, but lost to Dr. Wilbert McIntyre, the incumbent MP and Liberal candidate. Day resigned as mayor of Daysland on November 1, 1910, citing his excessive absences from the town. He was succeeded as mayor in 1911 by Daniel Rabbitt.

The Day family moved to Edmonton in January 1912. After his wife's death in 1914, he served as a major in the Army Reserve at Edmonton and Wabamun from 1915 to his death in 1919. Day would also be a personal friend of future Prime Minister of Canada Arthur Meighen.

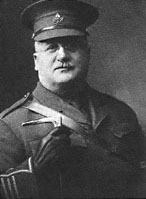
Day as a major with the army reserve

== Personal life, death and legacy ==
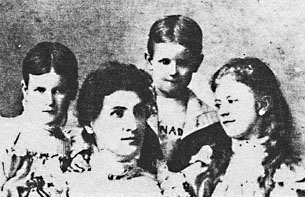
Ina Day with (L-R) Ina, George and Elsie

Day married Alexanderina "Ina" Sutherland (born c. 1863) in 1887. Sutherland was the youngest of 5 daughters to a tea merchant, John Sutherland in Cobourg, Ontario. They had 4 children, Elsie Margaret, Ina Ansley, George Sutherland, and Edgerton Winnett "Ted" Day. The oldest daughter, Elsie, born 1889 completed her education at St. Hilda's College, University of Toronto. She married a dentist, Robert Arthur Rooney, and had 3 children. She died in 1975. The second daughter, Ina Ansley, born 1891 also completed her education at St. Hilda's College in Toronto. She married Ed Brennan, and had one daughter, Ina. She died in 1987. The elder son, George Sutherland, born 1894, attended college in Toronto, and served in World War I overseas for four and a half years. While overseas, he served for almost 2 years at the London Administration Office as paymaster for all Canadian Forces. Upon his return to Canada, he worked at the Soldier Settlement Board, and then as an insurance adjuster. He died in 1985. The youngest son, Edgerton Winnett, Jr. "Ted", born 1901, worked as a lawyer and served as a colonel with the 49th Battalion, CEF. He worked at the office of the Judge's Advocate in Ottawa upon his return from overseas. He died in 1982.

Edgerton W. Day died at 9:15 a.m. on February 11, 1919, at the Royal Alexandra Hospital in Edmonton after an illness of several months. He was buried in the Edmonton Cemetery. His wife of 27 years, Ina had died on May 25, 1914, and Edgerton Day was interred alongside her.

Day had considered himself a colonizer. He was described to have done "all in his power to promote welfare and to improve the conditions of the town and district". An article from the Weekly British Whig in 1907 said of Day, "Mr. Day went into the business with his whole heart and soul, studying all the conditions of the country, etc., and it was in this way that he was able to accomplish what he did. He started life as an ordinary man, with no capital whatever, but he had the grit and perseverance, and this is almost sure to win out in the long run. Mr. Day's many friends are more than pleased to learn of his great success."

== Bibliography ==
- Daysland History Book Society (1982). Along the Crocus Trail : a history of Daysland and districts. Daysland, Alberta: Daysland History Book Society. ISBN 0-88925-254-8.
