= Battle River (electoral district) =

Former federal electoral district in Alberta, Canada

Alberta electoral district

Defunct federal electoral district
- Legislature: House of Commons
- District created: 1914
- District abolished: 1976
- First contested: 1917
- Last contested: 1974

Battle River was a federal electoral district in Alberta, Canada, that was represented in the House of Commons of Canada at various times from 1914 to 2005. This riding was created in 1914 from parts of Strathcona and Victoria ridings. It was abolished in 1952 when it was redistributed into Acadia, Battle River—Camrose, Red Deer and Vegreville ridings.

In 1966, it was recreated from parts of Acadia, Battle River—Camrose, Red Deer and Wetaskiwin ridings. It was abolished again in 1976 when it was redistributed into Crowfoot, Vegreville and Wetaskiwin ridings.

The riding has existed several times:

- from 1914 – 1952
- from 1966 – 1976
- from 2004 – 2005

In 2004, Westlock—St. Paul riding was renamed "Battle River", but the name was changed back to "Westlock—St. Paul" before an election was held.

== Members of Parliament ==
Battle River
Parliament	Years	Member	Party
District created from Strathcona and Victoria
13th	1917–1921	William John Blair	Government (Unionist)
14th	1921–1925	Henry Elvins Spencer	Progressive
15th	1925–1926	Henry Elvins Spencer	Progressive
16th	1926–1930	Henry Elvins Spencer	United Farmers
17th	1930–1935	Henry Elvins Spencer	United Farmers
18th	1935–1940	Robert Fair	Social Credit
19th	1940–1945	Robert Fair	New Democracy
20th	1945–1949	Robert Fair	Social Credit
21st	1949–1953	Robert Fair	Social Credit
District dissolved into Acadia, Battle River—Camrose, Red Deer and Vegreville
District created from Acadia, Battle River—Camrose, Red Deer and Wetaskiwin
28th	1968–1972	Cliff Downey	Progressive Conservative
29th	1972–1974	Harry Kuntz	Progressive Conservative
30th	1974–1979	Arnold Malone	Progressive Conservative
District dissolved into Crowfoot, Vegreville, and Wetaskiwin

== Election results ==
=== 1974 ===
1974 Canadian federal election
Party	Candidate	Votes	%	±%
Progressive Conservative	Arnold Malone	16,819	68.07	+4.49
Liberal	Norman Rolf	3,674	14.87	+2.06
New Democratic	Vincent Eriksson	2,157	8.73	–4.66
Social Credit	Douglas H. Munro	2,058	8.33	–1.88
Total valid votes		24,708	99.75	
Total rejected ballots		62	0.25	–2.79
Turnout		24,770	70.49	–7.59
Eligible voters/turnout		35,138		
Progressive Conservative hold		Swing		+3.27
Source: Library of Parliament

=== 1972 ===
1972 Canadian federal election
Party	Candidate	Votes	%	±%
Progressive Conservative	Harry Kuntz	16,268	63.58	–0.78
New Democratic	Vincent Eriksson	3,427	13.39	+5.92
Liberal	Rod Knaut	3,277	12.81	–4.07
Social Credit	Douglas H. Munro	2,613	10.21	–1.07
Total valid votes		25,585	96.96	
Total rejected ballots		803	3.04	+2.45
Turnout		26,388	78.08	+2.16
Eligible voters/turnout		33,794		
Progressive Conservative hold		Swing		+2.57
Source: Library of Parliament

=== 1968 ===
1968 Canadian federal election
Party	Candidate	Votes	%	±%
Progressive Conservative	Cliff Downey	15,725	64.36	–
Liberal	Rod Knaut	4,124	16.88	–
Social Credit	Stan Valleau	2,756	11.28	–
New Democratic	William M. Scotten	1,827	7.48	–
Total valid votes		24,432	99.41	
Total rejected ballots		145	0.59	–
Turnout		24,577	75.92	–
Eligible voters/turnout		32,372		
Progressive Conservative gain		Swing		–
Source: Library of Parliament

=== 1949 ===
1949 Canadian federal election
Party	Candidate	Votes	%	±%
Social Credit	Robert Fair	7,708	54.97	+6.99
Co-operative Commonwealth	Francis Clifford Saville	4,337	30.93	+10.94
Liberal	Lee Fox Green	1,977	14.10	+0.88
Total valid votes		14,022	99.28	
Total rejected ballots		102	0.72	–0.72
Turnout		14,124	68.74	+0.50
Eligible voters/turnout		20,547		
Social Credit hold		Swing		+8.97
Source: Library of Parliament

=== 1945 ===
1945 Canadian federal election
Party	Candidate	Votes	%	±%
Social Credit	Robert Fair	6,250	47.98	+6.81
Co-operative Commonwealth	Henry Elvins Spencer	2,604	19.99	–7.76
Liberal	Francis Clifford Saville	1,722	13.22	–17.86
Progressive Conservative	George Bennett	1,661	12.75	–
Labor–Progressive	Ewart Pearse Taylor	790	6.06	–
Total valid votes		13,027	98.56	
Total rejected ballots		190	1.44	+0.48
Turnout		13,217	68.24	+11.94
Eligible voters/turnout		19,368		
Social Credit gain from New Democracy		Swing		+20.11
Source: Library of Parliament

=== 1940 ===
1940 Canadian federal election
Party	Candidate	Votes	%	±%
New Democracy	Robert Fair	5,045	41.17	–6.73
Liberal	Ernest Arthur Pitman	3,808	31.08	+10.53
Co-operative Commonwealth	Henry Elvins Spencer	3,401	27.75	+7.21
Total valid votes		12,254	99.05	
Total rejected ballots		118	0.95	–0.01
Turnout		12,372	56.30	–13.51
Eligible voters/turnout		21,976		
New Democracy gain from Social Credit		Swing		+25.85
Source: Library of Parliament

=== 1935 ===
1935 Canadian federal election
Party	Candidate	Votes	%	±%
Social Credit	Robert Fair	7,029	47.90	–
Liberal	Martin L. Forster	3,015	20.55	–
Co-operative Commonwealth	Henry Elvins Spencer	3,015	20.55	–43.09
Conservative	John William Geddie Morrison	1,614	11.00	–25.36
Total valid votes		14,673	99.03	
Total rejected ballots		143	0.97	+0.97
Turnout		14,816	69.81	+13.12
Eligible voters/turnout		21,223		
Social Credit gain from United Farmers of Alberta		Swing		+34.23
Source: Library of Parliament

=== 1930 ===
1930 Canadian federal election
Party	Candidate	Votes	%	±%
United Farmers of Alberta	Henry Elvins Spencer	6,874	63.64	–10.18
Conservative	John William Geddie Morrison	3,927	36.36	+10.18
Total valid votes		10,801	100.00	
Total rejected ballots		unknown		
Turnout		10,801	56.69	+11.07
Eligible voters/turnout		19,054		
United Farmers of Alberta hold		Swing		–10.18
Source: Library of Parliament

=== 1926 ===
1926 Canadian federal election
Party	Candidate	Votes	%	±%
United Farmers of Alberta	Henry Elvins Spencer	5,597	73.82	+13.43
Conservative	John William Geddie Morrison	1,985	26.18	+6.71
Total valid votes		7,582	100.00	
Total rejected ballots		unknown		
Turnout		7,582	45.61	–4.38
Eligible voters/turnout		16,623		
United Farmers of Alberta gain from Progressive		Swing		+73.82
Source: Library of Parliament

=== 1925 ===
1925 Canadian federal election
Party	Candidate	Votes	%	±%
Progressive	Henry Elvins Spencer	5,067	60.39	–19.30
Liberal	Raymond McFarlane Lee	1,690	20.14	+11.05
Conservative	John William Geddie Morrison	1,634	19.47	+8.24
Total valid votes		8,391	100.00	
Total rejected ballots		unknown		
Turnout		8,391	49.99	–19.52
Eligible voters/turnout		16,786		
Progressive hold		Swing		–4.12
Source: Library of Parliament

=== 1921 ===
1921 Canadian federal election
Party	Candidate	Votes	%	±%
Progressive	Henry Elvins Spencer	12,247	79.68	–
Conservative	John William Geddie Morrison	1,726	11.23	–
Liberal	Henry Vernon Fieldhouse	1,397	9.09	–
Total valid votes		15,370	100.00	
Total rejected ballots		unknown		
Turnout		15,370	69.51	–7.86
Eligible voters/turnout		22,111		
Progressive gain from Government (Unionist)		Swing		–
Source: Library of Parliament

=== 1917 ===
1917 Canadian federal election
Party	Candidate	Votes	%
Government (Unionist)	William John Blair	5,733	57.75
Opposition	Daniel Webster Warner	4,195	42.25
Total valid votes		9,928	100.00
Total rejected ballots		unknown	
Turnout		9,928	77.38
Eligible voters/turnout		12,831	
Government (Unionist) gain		Swing	
Source: Library of Parliament

== See also ==
- List of Canadian electoral districts
- Historical federal electoral districts of Canada
