= Daniel Warner =

Daniel Warner may refer to:

- Daniel Warner (artist) (born 1974), artist and graphic designer
- Daniel Webster Warner (1857–1933), farmer, rancher and Canadian federal politician
- Daniel Bashiel Warner (1815–1880), President of Liberia, 1864–1868
- Daniel Sidney Warner (1842–1895), church reformer and a founder of the Church of God (Anderson)
- Dan Warner (musician) (1970–2019), American musician
