= Edmonton Bike Park =

Mountain biking park in Alberta, Canada

- Interactive map of Edmonton Bike Park
- Type: Mountain biking park
- Location: Edmonton, Alberta
- Website: Official website

Edmonton Bike Park is a public mountain biking park under construction in Edmonton, Alberta, within Queen Elizabeth Park. The steep slopes of trails in the North Saskatchewan River valley parks system have attracted mountain biking, 150–200 km of trails. After five years of preparation and fundraising, the community organization Edmonton Mountain Bike Alliance broke ground in August 2025. The organization received $1 million from the city and provincial government to build and maintain a mountain bike park on the site of a former wastewater treatment plant.

An environmental group, the Edmonton River Valley Conservation Coalition, contested the park's construction in 2025 as an unwarranted removal of trees and wildlife habitat.

Approximately 150 volunteer laborers worked to build out the park in the summer of 2025, with approximately 30,000 labor hours volunteered by June 2026. Due to heavy rains in 2026 interrupting construction, the planned 2026 opening has been delayed multiple times. As of September 2026, the park is scheduled to open in 2027.
