= Peter Talbot =

Peter Talbot may refer to:

- Peter Talbot (bishop) (1620–1680), Roman Catholic Archbishop of Dublin, Ireland
- Peter Talbot (politician) (1854–1919), former Canadian Senator
