= Rundle Park =

Rundle Park may refer to:

- Rundle Park / Kadlitpina, Adelaide, Australia
- Rundle Park (Edmonton), Alberta, Canada
