= Edmonton Folk Music Festival =

Canadian music festival

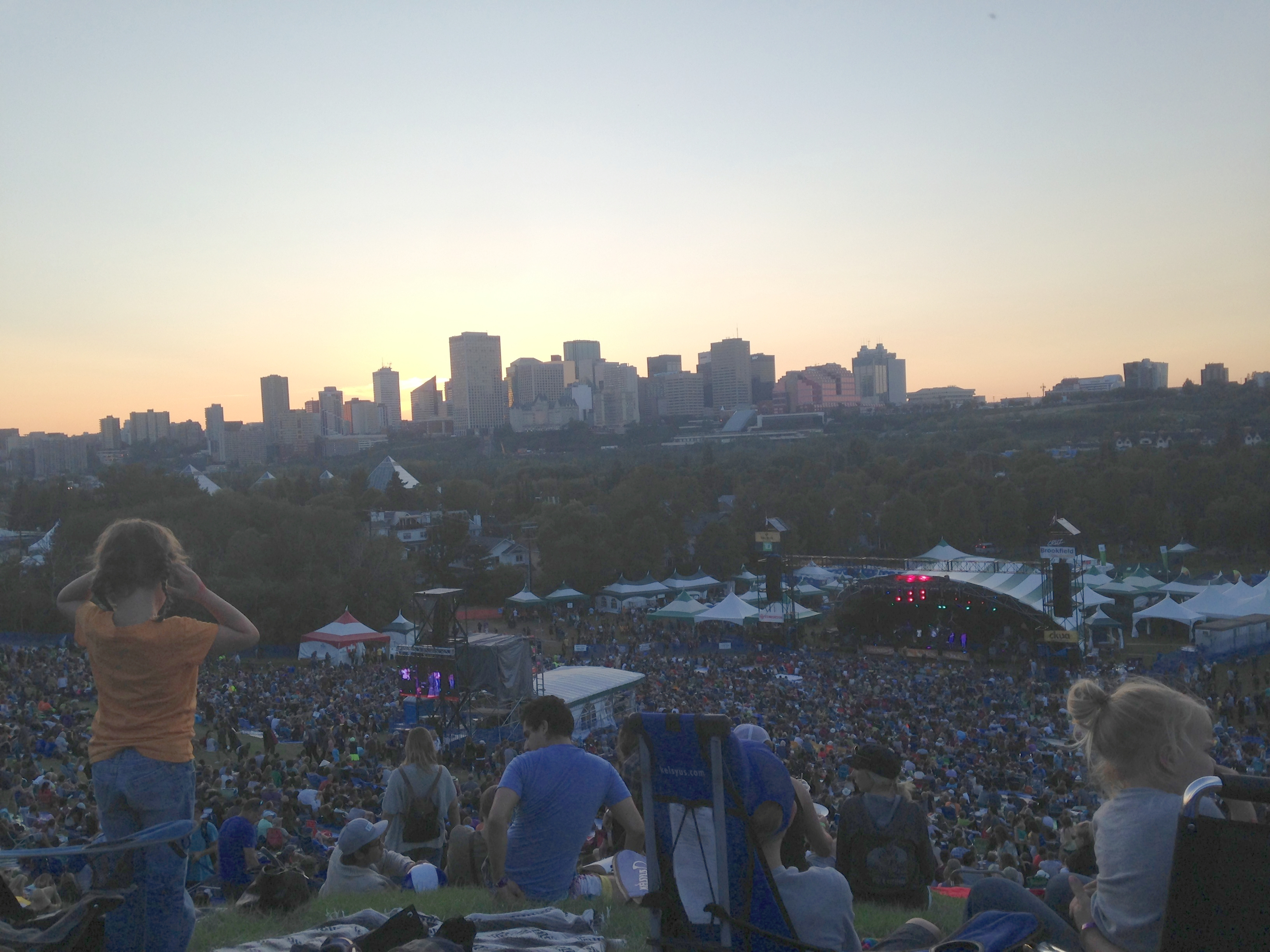
- View of the Edmonton skyline from EFMF in the 37th year of the festival.
- Genre: Folk music
- Locations: Edmonton, Alberta, Canada; 53.534°N 113.472°W
- Years active: 1980-2019, 2021 – present
- Founders: Don Whalen
- Website: edmontonfolkfest.org

The Edmonton Folk Music Festival (often called Edmonton Folk Fest or EMFM) is one of Canada's music festivals, held every August in Edmonton, Alberta. Founded in 1980, it takes place in Gallagher Park, a hillside venue overlooking the city's downtown skyline.

During the daytime hours of the festival, there are six active stages hosting workshops and concerts. There are food vendors, craftspeople, CD tents, and a beer garden.

The EFMF is a volunteer-based event, which keeps ticket prices down. Volunteers help conduct the festival each year, filling roles including food and drink service, venue security, and construction of the event stages. There are over 2,700 people on the volunteer list each year.

The EFMF is held at Gallagher Park, on the southern slope of the North Saskatchewan River valley. During the winter the area is a ski club. The mainstage audience seating is a natural amphitheatre.

Since 2011, the festival has been four days long.

== Performers ==
The Edmonton Folk Music Festival has hosted musicians from six continents, including acts from Cuba, Mexico, Brazil, Zimbabwe, South Africa, Kenya, Mongolia, China, India, and Tuva. However, the majority of performers come from Canada, the United States, and the United Kingdom.

The festival also includes performers from many different genres. There are commonly folk, Celtic, bluegrass, blues, gospel, roots, and worldbeat acts. Another large theme of the festival is global representation. Some musicians travel from North America, Latin America, Europe, Africa, Asia, and Australia to perform. Previous performers include k.d. lang, Joni Mitchell, Blue Rodeo, Stan Rogers, Great Big Sea, Oysterband, Loreena McKennitt, Norah Jones, Steve Earle, The Blind Boys Of Alabama, David Gray, Neko Case, Van Morrison, David Byrne, Michael Franti, Hanggai, K'Naan, Passenger, Mt. Joy, and Rainbow Kitten Surprise. In addition to mainstage, and sidestage, concerts by individual artists, the festival has collaborating artists on shared stages.

Edmonton local performers are also welcomed. There are youth, young adults, and seasoned performers from Edmonton that will showcase their talents.

== History ==
The first festival was organized as part of the 75th anniversary celebrations of Alberta. It was held in Gold Bar Park. The next year, the location changed to its current venue. The first year that the festival was canceled was 2020, due to COVID-19.

=== Artistic directors ===
- 1980-1985 Don Whalen
- 1986-1988 Holger Petersen
- 1989–2019, 2021-present Terry Wickham

== See also ==
- List of festivals in Edmonton
- List of festivals in Alberta
- List of music festivals in Canada
- Category:Music festivals in Canada
