= Battle River—Camrose =

Former federal electoral district in Alberta, Canada

Alberta electoral district

Defunct federal electoral district
- Legislature: House of Commons
- District created: 1953
- District abolished: 1968
- First contested: 1953
- Last contested: 1965

Battle River—Camrose was a federal electoral district in Alberta, Canada, that was represented in the House of Commons of Canada from 1953 to 1968. This riding was created in 1952 from parts of Battle River, and Camrose ridings. It was abolished in 1966 when it was redistributed into Battle River, Vegreville and Wetaskiwin ridings.

== Members of Parliament ==
Battle River—Camrose
Parliament	Years	Member	Party
District created from Battle River and Camrose
22nd	1953–1955	Robert Fair	Social Credit
22nd	1955–1957	James Alexander Smith	Social Credit
23rd	1957–1958	James Alexander Smith	Social Credit
24th	1958–1962	Clifford Smallwood	Progressive Conservative
25th	1962–1963	Clifford Smallwood	Progressive Conservative
26th	1963–1965	Clifford Smallwood	Progressive Conservative
27th	1965–1968	Clifford Smallwood	Progressive Conservative
District dissolved into Battle River, Vegreville and Wetaskiwin

== Election results ==
=== 1965 ===
1965 Canadian federal election
Party	Candidate	Votes	%	±%
Progressive Conservative	Clifford Smallwood	14,015	57.87	–2.97
Social Credit	Frederick R. Barber	5,531	22.84	–0.55
Liberal	Harold J. Yerxa	2,929	12.09	+1.34
New Democratic	Alfred O. Arnston	1,745	7.20	+2.19
Total valid votes		24,220	99.69	
Total rejected ballots		75	0.31	–0.10
Turnout		24,295	77.11	–5.08
Eligible voters		31,508		
Progressive Conservative hold		Swing		–1.76
Source: Library of Parliament

=== 1963 ===
1963 Canadian federal election
Party	Candidate	Votes	%	±%
Progressive Conservative	Clifford Smallwood	15,565	60.84	+7.39
Social Credit	Arthur Henry Rosenau	5,984	23.39	–4.65
Liberal	Stanley J. Perka	2,752	10.76	–1.59
New Democratic	Alfred O. Arnston	1,283	5.01	–1.16
Total valid votes		25,584	99.59	
Total rejected ballots		105	0.41	–0.16
Turnout		25,689	82.19	+3.87
Eligible voters		31,255		
Progressive Conservative hold		Swing		+1.37
Source: Library of Parliament

=== 1962 ===
1962 Canadian federal election
Party	Candidate	Votes	%	±%
Progressive Conservative	Clifford Smallwood	12,883	53.45	–3.93
Social Credit	James A. Smith	6,758	28.04	+1.05
Liberal	Robert A. Jones	2,976	12.35	+2.60
New Democratic	Alfred O. Arnston	1,488	6.17	+0.28
Total valid votes		24,105	99.43	
Total rejected ballots		139	0.57	+0.20
Turnout		24,244	78.32	+2.49
Eligible voters		30,955		
Progressive Conservative hold		Swing		–1.44
Source: Library of Parliament

=== 1958 ===
1958 Canadian federal election
Party	Candidate	Votes	%	±%
Progressive Conservative	Clifford Smallwood	13,049	57.38	+40.42
Social Credit	James A. Smith	6,137	26.99	–21.75
Liberal	Francis Clifford Saville	2,216	9.74	–14.85
Co-operative Commonwealth	Harold Rolseth	1,340	5.89	–3.82
Total valid votes		22,742	99.62	
Total rejected ballots		86	0.38	–0.18
Turnout		22,828	75.83	+0.65
Eligible voters		30,103		
Progressive Conservative gain from Social Credit		Swing		+9.33
Source: Library of Parliament

=== 1957 ===
1957 Canadian federal election
Party	Candidate	Votes	%	±%
Social Credit	James A. Smith	10,945	48.74	+7.04
Liberal	S. Carl Heckbert	5,523	24.59	–15.19
Progressive Conservative	Clifford Smallwood	3,808	16.96	–
Co-operative Commonwealth	Harold Rolseth	2,180	9.71	–8.80
Total valid votes		22,456	99.44	
Total rejected ballots		126	0.56	+0.56
Turnout		22,582	75.18	–
Eligible voters		30,038		
Social Credit hold		Swing		–4.08
Source: Library of Parliament

=== 1955 ===
Canadian federal by-election, November 11, 1955 Death of Robert Fair
Party	Candidate	Votes	%	±%
Social Credit	James A. Smith	8,455	41.70	–8.95
Liberal	F. Mac Smith	8,067	39.79	+14.95
Co-operative Commonwealth	William Irvine	3,753	18.51	+6.11
Total valid votes		20,275	100.00	
Total rejected ballots		unknown		
Turnout		20,275	–	–
Eligible voters				
Social Credit hold		Swing		+3.00
Source: Library of Parliament

=== 1953 ===
1953 Canadian federal election
Party	Candidate	Votes	%	±%
Social Credit	Robert Fair	9,238	50.65	–
Liberal	Francis Clifford Saville	4,531	24.84	–
Co-operative Commonwealth	Alfred O. Arnston	2,261	12.40	–
Progressive Conservative	Charles Henry McCleary	1,784	9.78	–
Labor–Progressive	Ewart Pearse Taylor	426	2.34	–
Total valid votes		18,240	99.43	
Total rejected ballots		104	0.57	–
Turnout		18,344	59.87	–
Eligible voters		30,641		
Social Credit gain from		Swing		+37.74
Source: Library of Parliament

== See also ==
- List of Canadian electoral districts
- Historical federal electoral districts of Canada
