= Victoria Park (Edmonton) =

Park in Edmonton, Canada

Coordinates: 53.5339°N 113.5227°W

Victoria Park is a municipal park in Edmonton, Alberta, that is part of the North Saskatchewan River valley parks system. The park features paved cycling and walking paths and several other amenities. Like the other parks in the valley parks system, the park is connected to others via multi-use trails. The park was named in honour of Queen Victoria. It opened 25 May, 1914.

== Activities ==
- Sports: The Victoria Golf Course is an 18-hole golf course featuring a driving range, open fields, and clubs with coaches in them. Snowshoeing and cross-country skiing is available. There is a 400m Olympic-size track in the park, called the Victoria Park Oval. Skaters can lace up and use the facilities in the Victoria Park Pavilion, opened in 2015. The oval is protected from strong winds by the river valley and tall trees. The rink use is shared between the City of Edmonton and the Edmonton Speed Skating Club, which allows public skating during times not owned by the club. The park also has a cricket pitch that is well-beloved by the West Indian community.
- Picnicking: The park features several picnic sites, some of them roofed. Picnic tables are dotted around the park.
