= James A. Smith (Canadian politician) =

Canadian politician

Member of the Canadian Parliament for Battle River—Camrose
- In office 1955–1958
- Preceded by: Robert Fair
- Succeeded by: Clifford Smallwood

Personal details
- Born: James Alexander Smith; August 22, 1911 Bawlf, Alberta, Canada
- Died: March 29, 1993 (aged 81) Edmonton, Alberta, Canada
- Party: Social Credit Party of Canada
- Occupation: businessman

James Alexander Smith (August 22, 1911 – March 29, 1993) was a teacher and politician. He was a Member of Parliament in Canada from 1955 until 1958. He was born in Bawlf, Alberta, Canada.

A member of the Social Credit Party of Canada, Smith first ran for the House of Commons of Canada in a by-election held in the electoral district of Battle River—Camrose. He defeated Liberal candidate Mac Smith by fewer than 400 votes; former Member of Parliament William Irvine, of the Co-operative Commonwealth Federation, came in third. He ran for re-election in the 1957 general election and won in a landslide. In the 1958 election, he lost his seat to Progressive Conservative candidate Clifford Smallwood, whom Smith had defeated the year before, in the context of a total electoral wipeout for Social Credit. Smith faced Smallwood again in the 1962 general election and was again defeated.

Smith ran in the electoral district of Peace River in the 1963 and 1965 elections. He lost to PC MP Ged Baldwin both times.

He married Margaret Bowen on July 2, 1936 at Wainwright, Alberta. He died in Edmonton in 1993.
