= Cliff Downey =

Canadian politician and farmer

Member of the Canadian Parliament for Battle River
- In office 1968–1972
- Preceded by: Robert Fair
- Succeeded by: Harry Kuntz

Personal details
- Born: May 24, 1928 Castor, Alberta, Canada
- Died: May 3, 2018 (aged 89) Edmonton, Alberta, Canada
- Party: Progressive Conservative Party of Canada
- Profession: farmer

Clifford William Downey (May 24, 1928 – May 3, 2018) was a farmer who served as a Canadian federal politician from 1968 to 1972. After leaving Parliament he became active in farmers rights movements.

Downey was elected to the House of Commons of Canada in the 1968 federal election. He defeated four other candidates in a landslide to win his only term in office. He retired from federal politics in 1972. Downey served on the Standing Committee on Finance, Trade and Economic Affairs and the Standing Committee on Privileges and Elections during his time in Parliament.

After leaving Parliament he became a member of the Alberta Surface Rights Board, and a Farmers Advocate of Alberta member and had been lobbying for surface rights for 20 years before retiring in 2006.

He was a native of Castor, Alberta, and has seven children, and two stepdaughters, including former MLA Brian C. Downey. He resided in Edmonton with his wife, Frances. Downey died on May 3, 2018, at the age of 89.
