= Daniel Webster Warner =

Canadian politician, farmer, and rancher

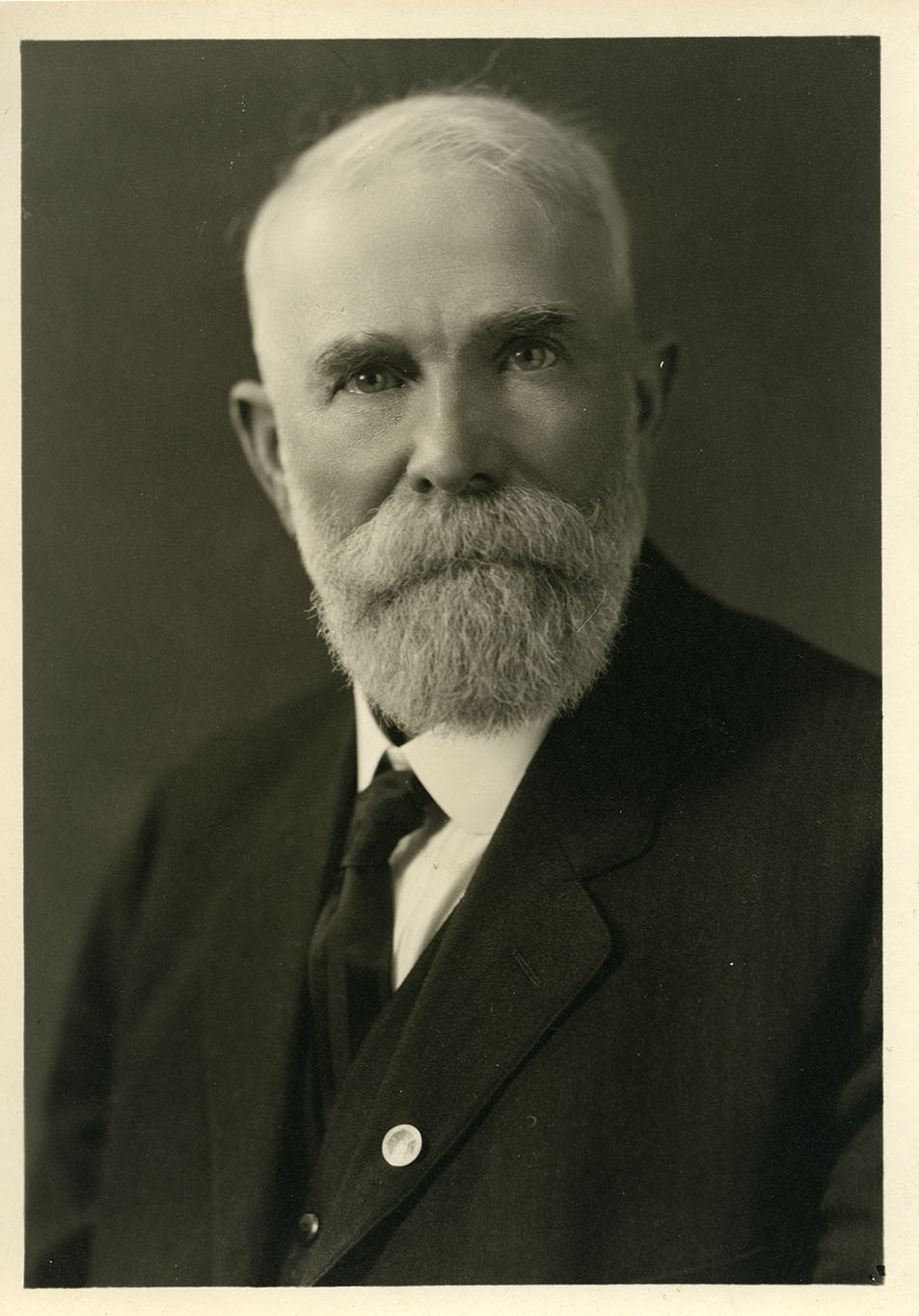

Member of the Canadian Parliament for Strathcona
- In office 1921–1925
- Preceded by: James McCrie Douglas
- Succeeded by: District Abolished

Personal details
- Born: October 1, 1857 Richland, Iowa, U.S.
- Died: May 14, 1933 (aged 75) Clover Bar, Alberta, Canada
- Party: Progressive

Daniel Webster Warner (October 1, 1857 – May 14, 1933) was a farmer, rancher and Canadian federal politician. He was active in the early farm organizations of the Edmonton area and then held important posts in the United Farmers of Alberta after its founding in 1909.

He was owner of the successful Gold Bar Farm. Part of his farm (the old riverlot no. 39) is now the site of the City of Edmonton Gold Bar Park.

On 16 December 1910 Warner was among the delegation of from 850 to 1,000 farmers who marched on the House of Commons. They were allowed to enter the House and present their briefs. This event became known as the "Siege of Ottawa".

Warner ran for a seat in the House of Commons of Canada in the 1917 Canadian federal election in the Battle River district. He ran as a Laurier Liberal candidate and was defeated in a close race by Unionist candidate William John Blair.

Warner ran again in the 1921 Canadian federal election, this time as a United Farmers (Progressive Party of Canada) candidate. His nomination as a United Farmers of Alberta candidate was hotly contested - his defeated opponent Rice Sheppard ran anyway as a Labour candidate. With a landslide, Warner defeated Sheppard and the incumbent Conservative MP, James McCrie Douglas (soon to be mayor of Edmonton). Warner served one term in Parliament.

He tried unsuccessfully for re-election in a different riding in the 1925 Canadian federal election. His electoral district of Strathcona had been abolished so he ran in the new Wetaskiwin district. He was defeated by Liberal candidate and former provincial MLA Stanley Tobin.
