= Daysland =

- Town
- Town of Daysland
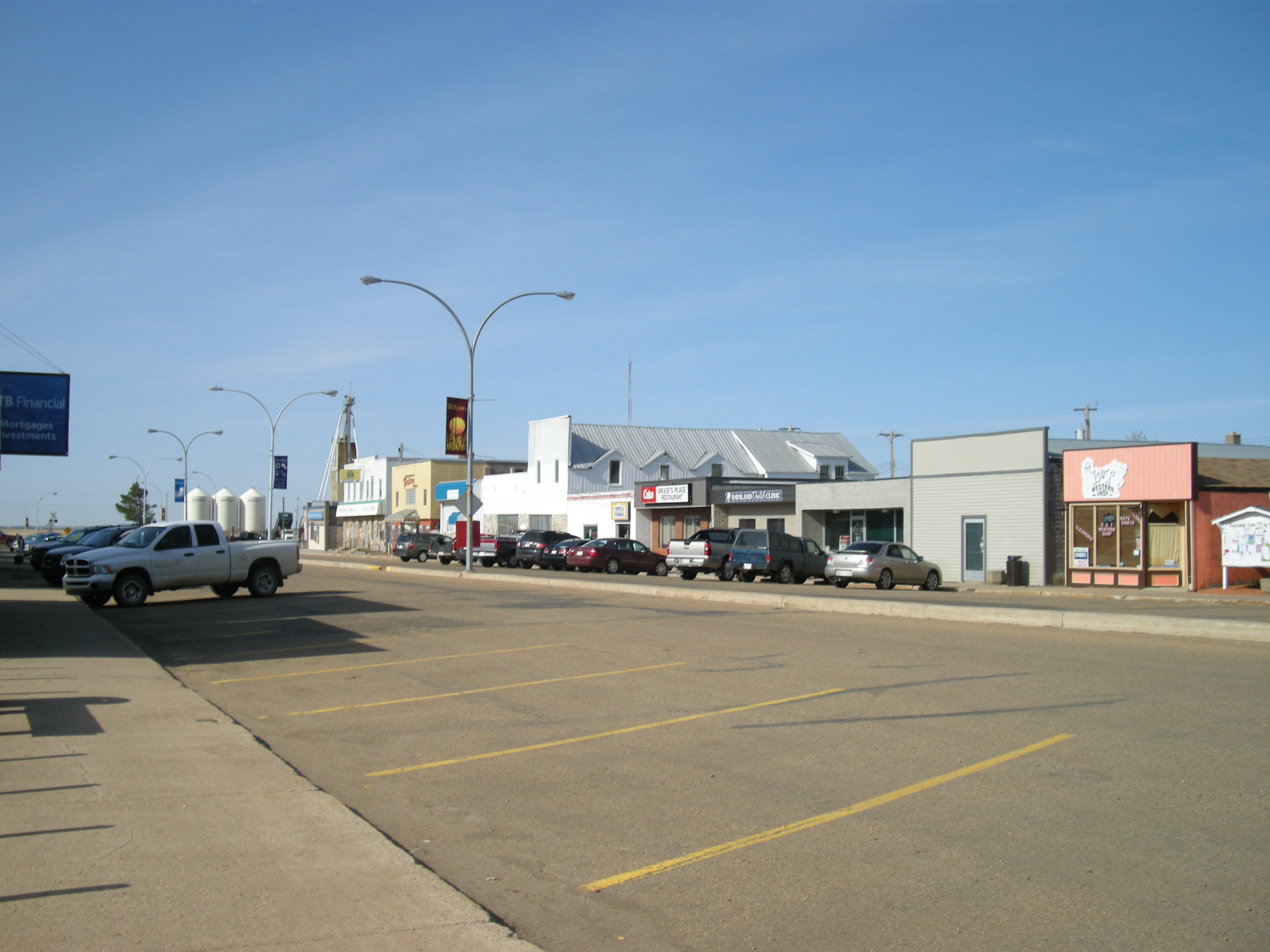
- Main Street, Daysland, 2012

- Location of Daysland in Alberta
- Coordinates: 52°51′48″N 112°15′13″W
- Country: Canada
- Province: Alberta
- Region: Central Alberta
- Census division: 7
- Municipal district: Flagstaff County
- Incorporated
  - Village: April 23, 1906
  - Town: April 2, 1907

Government
  - Mayor: Wayne Button
  - Governing body: Daysland Town Council

Area (2021)
  - Land: 1.77 km^{2} (0.68 sq mi)
- Elevation: 708 m (2,323 ft)

Population (2021)
  - Total: 789
  - Density: 445.2/km^{2} (1,153/sq mi)
- Time zone: UTC−06:00 (Alberta Time)
- Postal code span: T0B 1A0
- Highways: Highway 13; Highway 855
- Waterways: Wavy Lake
- Website: daysland.com

Daysland is a town in central Alberta, Canada. It is on Highway 13, approximately 43 kilometres (27 mi) east of Camrose.

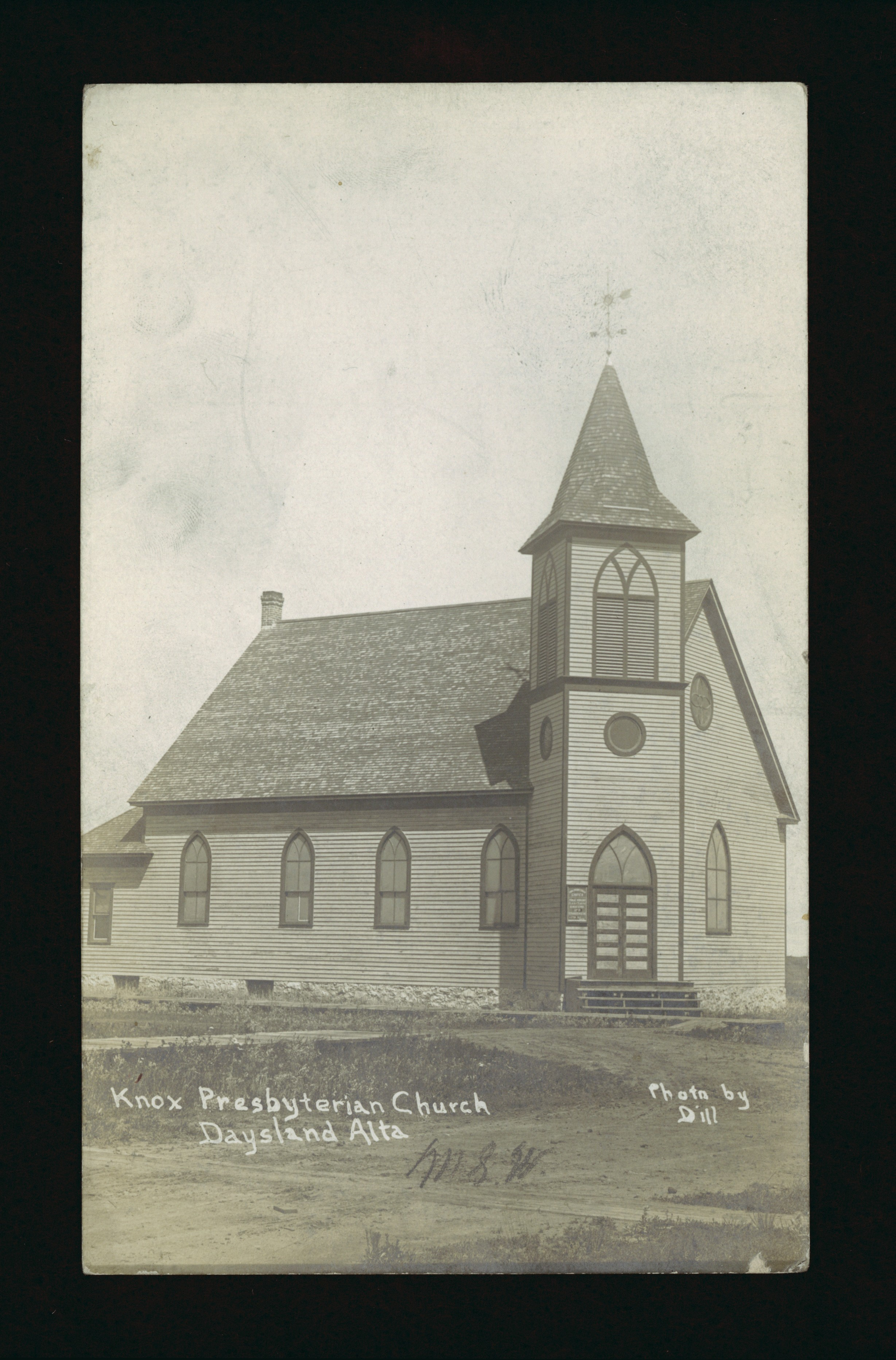
Exterior view of Knox Presbyterian Church in Daysland, Alberta. Source: University of Alberta Library Prairie Postcard Collection - https://archive.org/details/PC003364

== History ==
The community was named for its founder and first mayor, Edgerton W. Day, who purchased 116,483 acres (47,139 ha) of land from the CPR in 1904 to form the basis of Daysland.

== Demographics ==
In the 2021 Census of Population conducted by Statistics Canada, the Town of Daysland had a population of 789 living in 333 of its 356 total private dwellings, a change of −4.2% from its 2016 population of 824. With a land area of 1.77 km^{2} (0.68 sq mi), it had a population density of 445.8/km^{2} (1,154.5/sq mi) in 2021.

In the 2016 Census of Population conducted by Statistics Canada, the Town of Daysland recorded a population of 824 people living in 330 of its 356 total private dwellings, a 2.1% change from its 2011 population of 807. With a land area of 1.75 km^{2} (0.68 sq mi), it had a population density of 470.9/km^{2} (1,219.5/sq mi) in 2016.

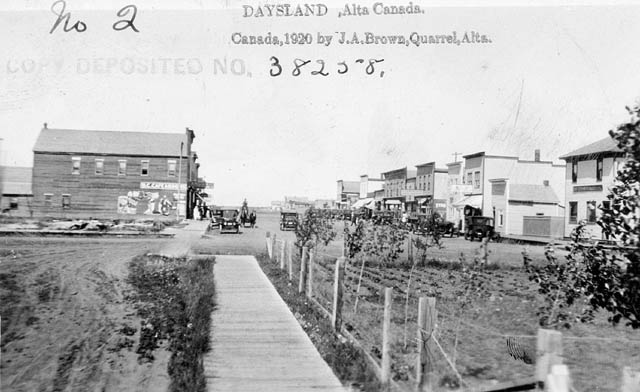
Daysland, 1920

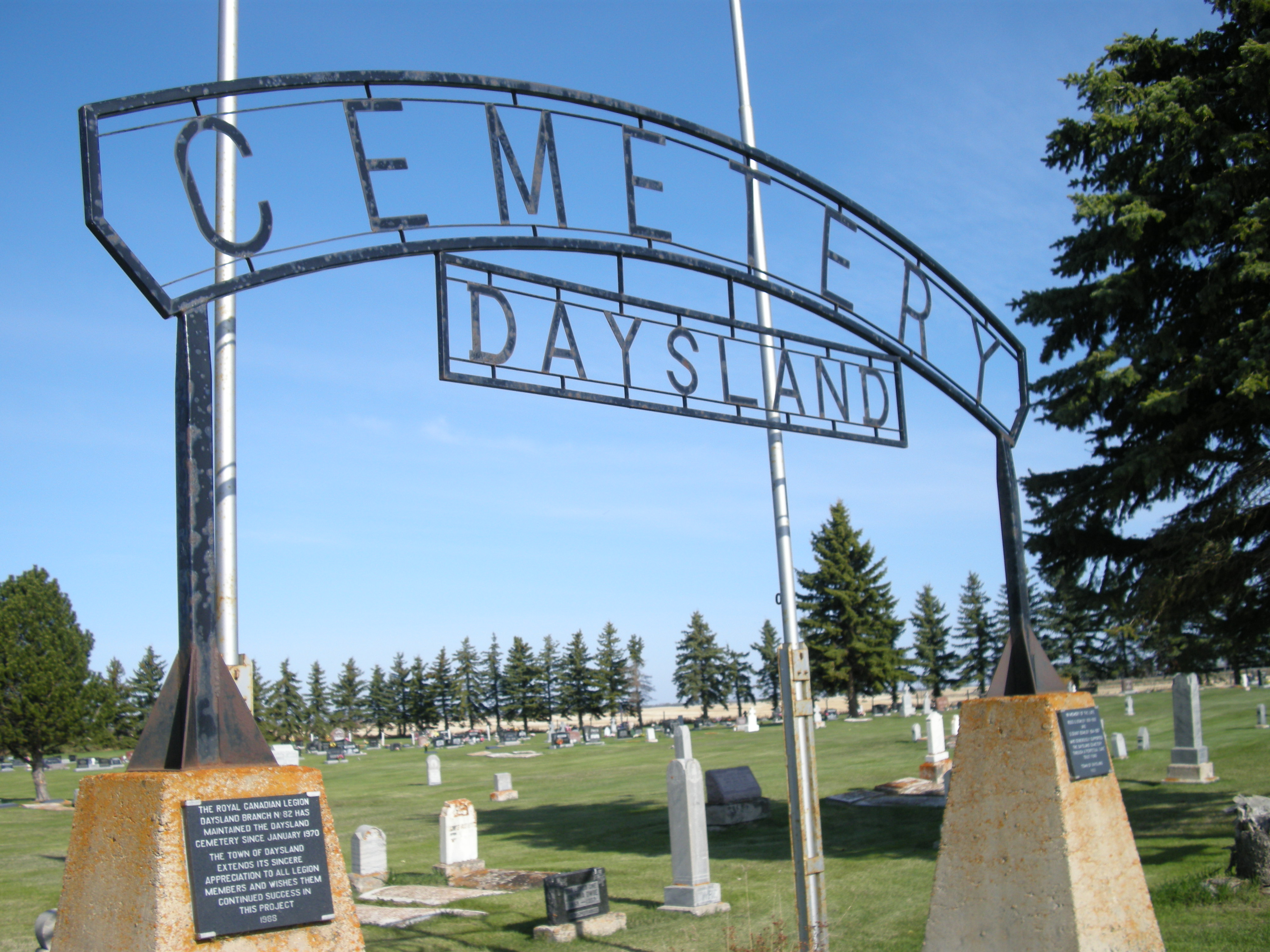
Daysland Cemetery, 2012

== Notable people ==
- Richard Petiot, professional hockey player
- Matthew Spiller, professional hockey player
- Dick Beddoes, sportscaster and journalist

== See also ==
- List of communities in Alberta
- List of towns in Alberta
