= Clifford Smallwood =

Canadian politician

- Official 1966 portrait

Member of the Canadian Parliament for Battle River—Camrose
- In office 1958–1968
- Preceded by: James A. Smith
- Succeeded by: district abolished

Personal details
- Born: Clifford Silas Smallwood; July 28, 1915 Irma, Alberta
- Died: November 14, 1979 (aged 64)
- Party: Progressive Conservative Party of Canada
- Occupation: farmer

Clifford Silas Smallwood (July 28, 1915 – November 14, 1979) was a farmer and a Canadian politician from 1958 to 1968.

== Federal politics ==
Smallwood first ran as a candidate for the House of Commons of Canada in the 1957 federal election. He was defeated by incumbent Member of Parliament James A. Smith. Another election was held the following year, and this time Smallwood defeated Smith in a landslide.

Smallwood ran for a second term in the 1962 election; he ran against Smith for the third time and defeated him once again in another landslide victory. The minority government fell on a confidence motion a year later forcing the dissolution of parliament and the 1963 federal election. Smallwood increased the size of his majority earning the largest win of his political career. He ran for his final term in office in the 1965 federal election winning another landslide. He retired in 1968 when his electoral district of Battle River—Camrose was abolished.

Smallwood ran in the 1971 Alberta general election in the electoral district of Wainwright; he was defeated by incumbent Henry Ruste of the Social Credit Party.
