= Park system =

Connected green spaces

The County of London Park System, planned by Patrick Abercrombie in 1943-4

A park system, also known as an open space system, is a network of parks and other green spaces that are connected by public walkways, bridleways or cycleways. The concept first emerged with the need to minimize fragmentation of natural environments and was referred to as "patch and corridor." In modern landscape architecture, the park system is collaborating with the idea of planning greenways, which run through urban and rural areas. These systems can serve the landscape through ecological, recreational, social, cultural, and healthful measures, and are designed with intentions of sustainability.

One of the earliest park systems, in London, came into existence by chance. As London expanded around former royal parks in the nineteenth century, St. James's Park, Green Park and Hyde Park became part of the urban area. This arrangement was admired in France and adopted for the nineteenth century re-planning of Paris by Baron Haussmann. It was also admired by Frederick Law Olmsted and used to create the famous Emerald Necklace in Boston. Another example is Ebenezer Howard's Adirondack Park concept. These green networks were part of the nineteenth century Garden City Movement.

In 1927, the Maryland-National Capital Park and Planning Commission was formed to plan and acquire parklands along stream valley corridors in the then-rural northern and eastern suburbs of Washington, D.C. Over 33,000 acres (130 km^{2}) are now protected in the Montgomery County, Maryland portion and provide welcome green space in this urbanized region. A major proposal for a park system was included in Patrick Abercrombie's 1943-4 County of London Plan.

The largest continuous urban park system in North America is the North Saskatchewan River valley parks system in Edmonton, Alberta, Canada, which is 7,400 ha (18,000 acres) in size and 48 km (30 mi) in length, and also includes 22 ravines, which have a combined total length of 103 km (64 mi). The largest urban park system in Australia is the Western Sydney Parklands, which is 5,280 ha (13,000 acres) in size and 27 km (17 mi) in length.

== See also ==
- Greenway (landscape)
- Landscape architecture
- Landscape planning
- National Park Service#National Park System of the United States
- Principles of intelligent urbanism
