= William John Blair =

Canadian politician

Member of Parliament for Battle River
- In office December 17, 1917 – December 5, 1921
- Succeeded by: Henry Elvins Spencer

Personal details
- Born: October 13, 1875 Embro, Ontario, Canada
- Died: April 24, 1943 (aged 67) Ingersoll, Ontario, Canada
- Party: Unionist

William John Blair (October 13, 1875 – April 24, 1943) was a Canadian engineer, farmer, teacher, soldier surveyor and federal politician from Alberta.

== Early life ==
William John Blair was born in Embro, Ontario on October 13, 1875 to John Blair, and his wife Ellen Smyth, both of Irish descent. Blair took his post secondary education at Woodstock College and later the University of Toronto where he completed a Bachelor of Applied Science in Civil Engineering. He began surveying in 1904 in Ontario and using his knowledge to Steak mining property which he later sold.

He married his wife Lottie May Nethercott in 1906 and they had one daughter and one son. He moved his family west to Alberta in 1910 and continued his survey work.

== Early political work ==
Blair first served in public office on the municipal level, for one term he served as Mayor of New Liskeard, Ontario from 1907 to 1908.

After Blair moved out west he attempted a career at Alberta provincial politics. He ran for a seat in the Alberta Legislature by running as the Conservative candidate in the ministerial by-election held on May 27, 1912 in the Sedgewick district. He was soundly defeated by incumbent Minister of Municipal Affairs Charles Stewart.

== Military service ==
Blair enlisted in the Canadian Expeditionary Force in 1916, becoming a recruiter for the 151st Battalion, a role he held until 1917.

== Federal politics ==
Blair would try his hand at federal politics running as the Unionist candidate in the 1917 Canadian federal election. He won the election, defeating Laurier Liberal candidate and future Member of Parliament Daniel Webster Warner in a hotly contested election. Blair would serve in the House of Commons for one term before retiring from federal politics.

== Late life and death ==
In 1925 Blair became very ill and moved his family to Barrie, Ontario he would spend the next 5 years recovering his health, moving back to Alberta in 1930. In 1937 he contracted Thrombosis and his family moved back to Ontario once again. He withdrew himself from public life and died April 24, 1943.
