= Robert Fair (Canadian politician) =

Canadian politician

Robert Fair (September 4, 1891 – November 1, 1954) was a Canadian farmer and politician.

Fair was born in Keelognes, parish of Turlough, County Mayo, Ireland. Fair first ran for the House of Commons in the 1935 federal election as the Social Credit candidate in Battle River; he defeated incumbent Henry Elvins Spencer. He remained in office until his death on November 1, 1954.

Parliament of Canada
Preceded by Henry Elvins Spencer	Member of Parliament for Battle River; 1935-1953	Succeeded by Cliff Downey
New district	Member of Parliament for Battle River—Camrose; 1953-1954	Succeeded by James Alexander Smith
