= Henry Elvins Spencer =

Canadian politician

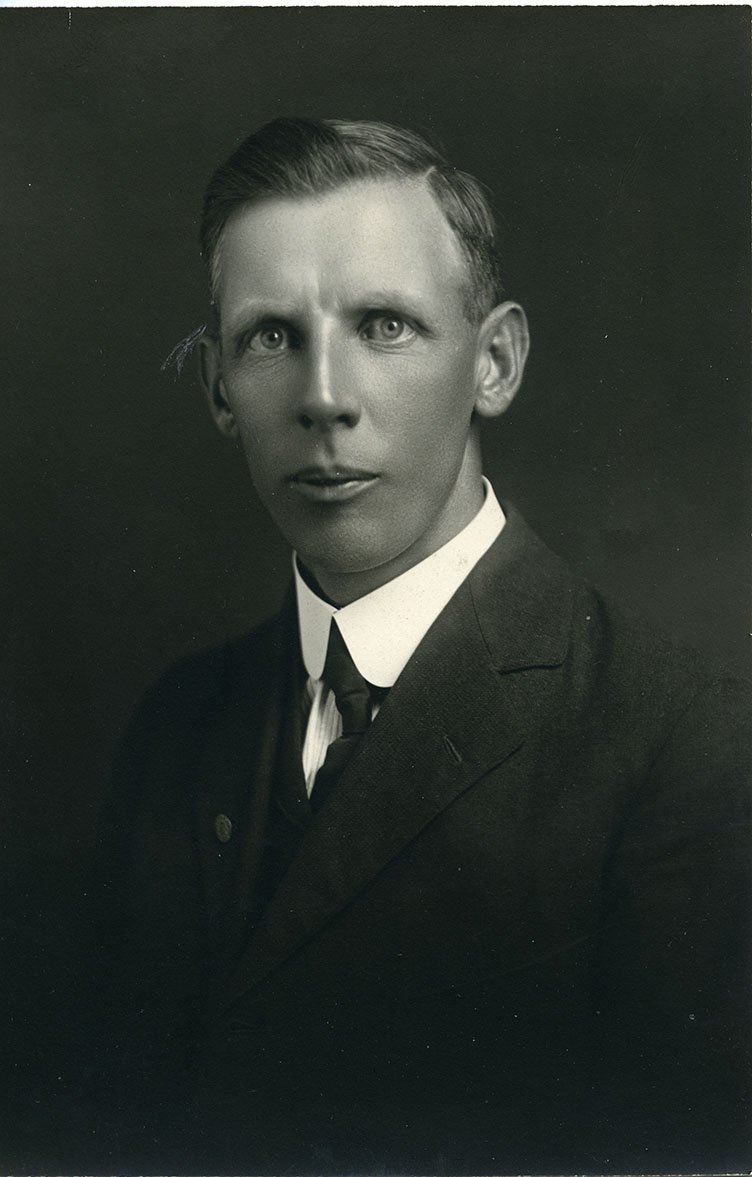

Member of the Canadian Parliament for Battle River
- In office 1921–1935
- Preceded by: William John Blair
- Succeeded by: Robert Fair

Personal details
- Born: 7 March 1882 England
- Died: 1 October 1972 (aged 90) Comox, British Columbia
- Party: Progressive (1921-1926); United Farmers of Alberta (1926-1935)

Henry Elvins Spencer (7 March 1882 – 1 October 1972) was a Canadian politician.

Born in the United Kingdom, Spencer worked as a printer and publisher in Paris from 1906 to 1907 before emigrating to Canada in 1908. Settling in Alberta, he worked as a farmer.

From 1917 to 1921, he was the provincial secretary of the United Farmers of Alberta.

He was elected to the House of Commons of Canada for the riding of Battle River in the 1921 federal election. A member of the United Farmers of Alberta, he was re-elected in 1925, 1926, and 1930.

He belonged to the Ginger Group of radical MPs and was a founding member of the Co-operative Commonwealth Federation in 1932.

He was defeated as a CCF candidate in the 1935 election and again in 1940 and 1945.

He retired to Comox, British Columbia in 1948 and died in 1972.
