= Harry Kuntz =

Canadian politician

Member of the Canadian Parliament for Battle River
- In office 1972–1973
- Preceded by: Cliff Downey
- Succeeded by: Arnold Malone

Personal details
- Born: May 13, 1929
- Died: November 16, 1973 (aged 44) Ottawa, Ontario
- Party: Progressive Conservative
- Spouse: Doreen Streberg
- Children: 5

Harry Mathew Kuntz (May 13, 1929 – November 16, 1973) was a contractor for seismic drilling projects. He served as a politician in his late life, becoming the mayor of Camrose and later a Canadian federal politician from 1972 to 1973.

Harry Kuntz was one of eight children of Mathew and Catherine Kuntz. He had two brothers and five sisters. His father, his brother Frederick, and his sister Rita predeceased him.

Kuntz began his political career by serving as mayor of Camrose, Alberta. He jumped to federal politics by running for a seat in the House of Commons of Canada in the 1972 federal election. A Progressive Conservative, Kuntz defeated the New Democrat, Liberal, and Social Credit candidates in a landslide. During his term in Parliament, he served as an Official Opposition member of the Standing Committee on Transport and Communications and the Standing Committee on Indian Affairs and Northern Development. He died suddenly while in office on November 16, 1973, at the age of 44.
