= North Saskatchewan River valley parks system =

Urban park network in Alberta, Canada

- Ribbon of Green, River Valley Parks
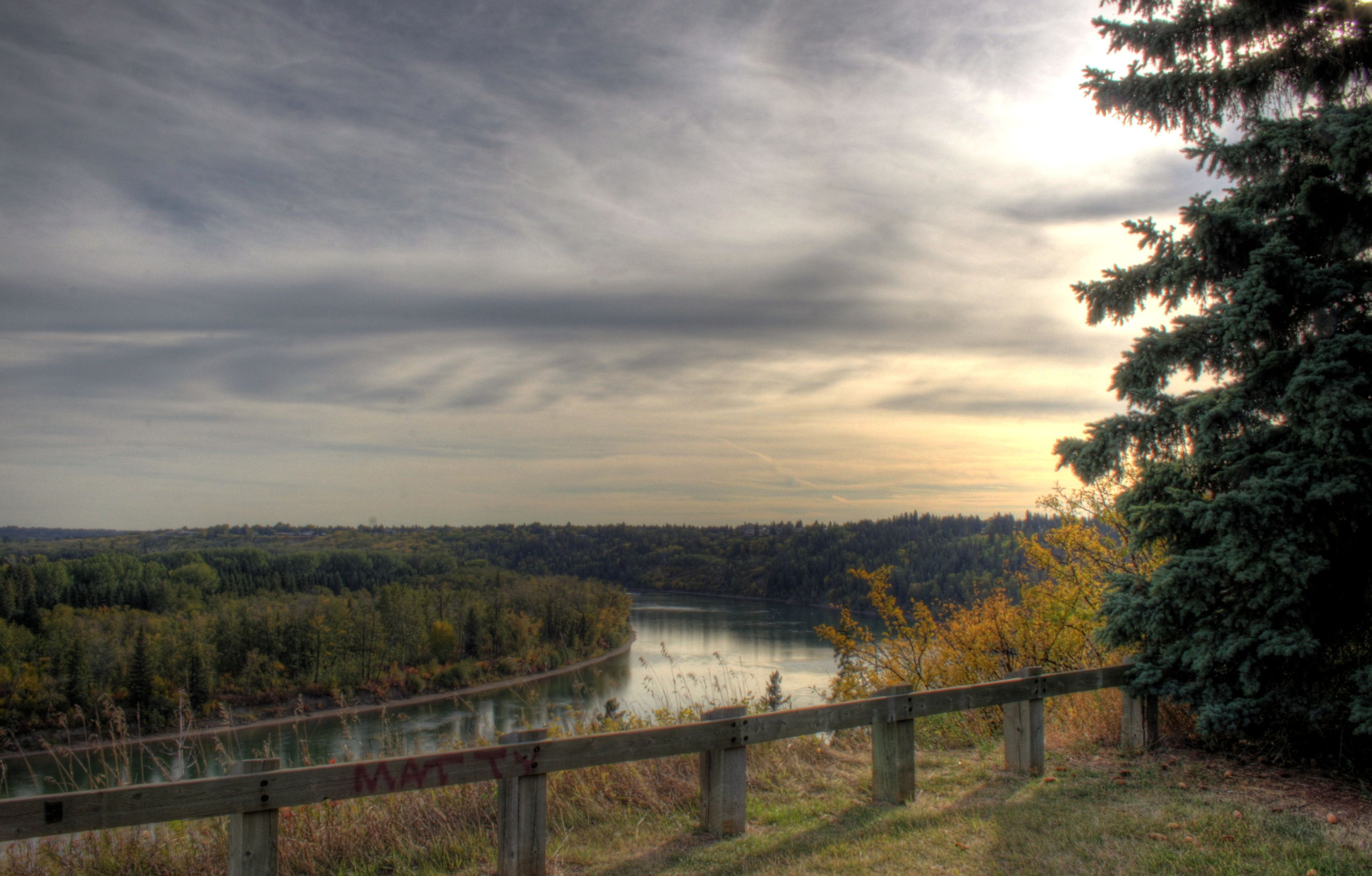
- The North Saskatchewan River valley from Glenora
- Interactive map of North Saskatchewan River valley parks system
- Type: Park system
- Location: Edmonton Metropolitan Region, Alberta, Canada
- Area: 7,300 hectares (18,000 acres)

The North Saskatchewan River valley parks system, also known as the Ribbon of Green or the River Valley Parks, is a continuous collection of urban parks around the North Saskatchewan River valley in the Edmonton Metropolitan Region of Alberta, Canada. The park system encompasses over 7,300 hectares (18,000 acres) of parkland, making it the largest contiguous area of urban parkland in the country. The park system is made up of over 30 provincial and municipal parks situated around the river from Devon to Fort Saskatchewan, with trails connecting most of the parks together.

Proposals to create a large park along Edmonton's riverfront were first made by landscape architect Frederick Todd in 1907, although the formation of a park system did not take shape until the late 20th century. In 1996, the River Valley Alliance (RVA) was formed to coordinate the development of the park system across the metropolitan region. Although large portions of the river valley are public parkland, some sections of the river valley are privately owned. In addition to the park system, the river valley is also used by the metropolitan area for stormwater management.

Most of the river valley is grasslands, although sections of it are forested. The river valley supports a high level of biodiversity and is used as a wildlife corridor by a variety of animals.

== History ==
The location of the present post-glacial river valley was created as a result of ice-marginal deposition.

Archaeological sites from around the area suggest that the First Nations have used the resources found in the North Saskatchewan River valley for thousands of years, and may have even modified the river valley to a certain degree. The vegetation found in the river valley changed dramatically from the late 1700s to the 1900s, partly owing to climatic change during the Little Ice Age. The introduction of non-native vegetation may be attributed to the arrival of Métis and European farmers; who also harvested trees for lumber, and used the valley as a grazing area for their livestock.

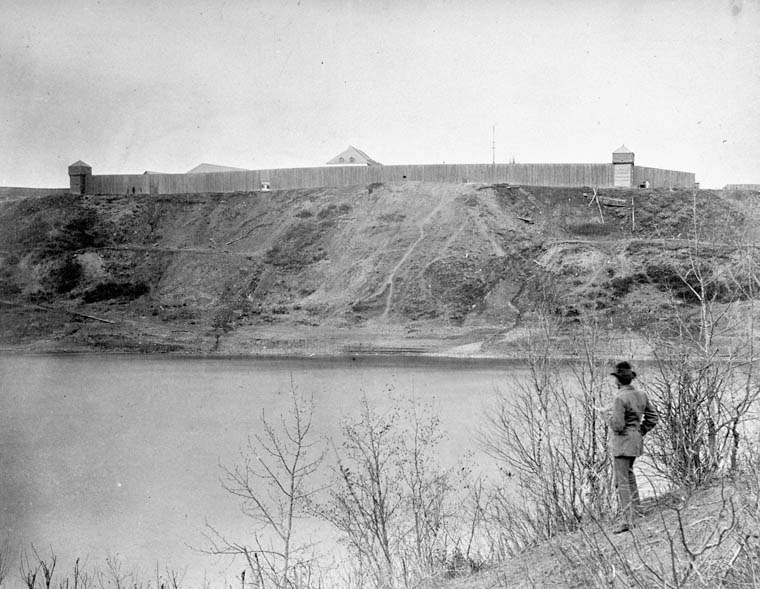
Fort Edmonton along the North Saskatchewan River, October 1870

Industrial developments in the river valley occurred during the late 19th and early 20th century, after the establishment of Fort Edmonton in 1811 and the completion of the Edmonton, Yukon & Pacific Railway in 1903. During this period, resources from the river valley were extracted in order to build and maintain the settlement (and later city) of Edmonton. The earliest brick-making and coal mining operations in the river valley occurred in the 1840s; with dump sites, gravel pits, and lumber yards built into the river valley during the late-19th and early 20th century. By the 1900s, most of the river valley was cleared of trees for lumber. Developments and the extraction of resources in Edmonton shifted from the river valley to the tablelands in the 1920s as resources began to flow into the city from further distances; allowing for the river valley's ecosystem to reestablish itself.

As well, river valley communities were built in Walterdale, Rossdale and Riverdale.

By the 1920s, Edmonton's river valley in Edmonton held dumps, golf courses, gravel pits, sewage plants, transportation corridors, and parks. The last coal mine in the river valley closed in 1970.

During the mid-20th century, proposals to use the river valley for a highway network were treated positively. Groat Ravine was covered with a road. Work on a freeway in MacKinnon Ravine Park was begun but was stopped due to fervent opposition, and the plan to build river valley highways was abandoned by 1974 due to public opposition.

=== Formation of a park system ===
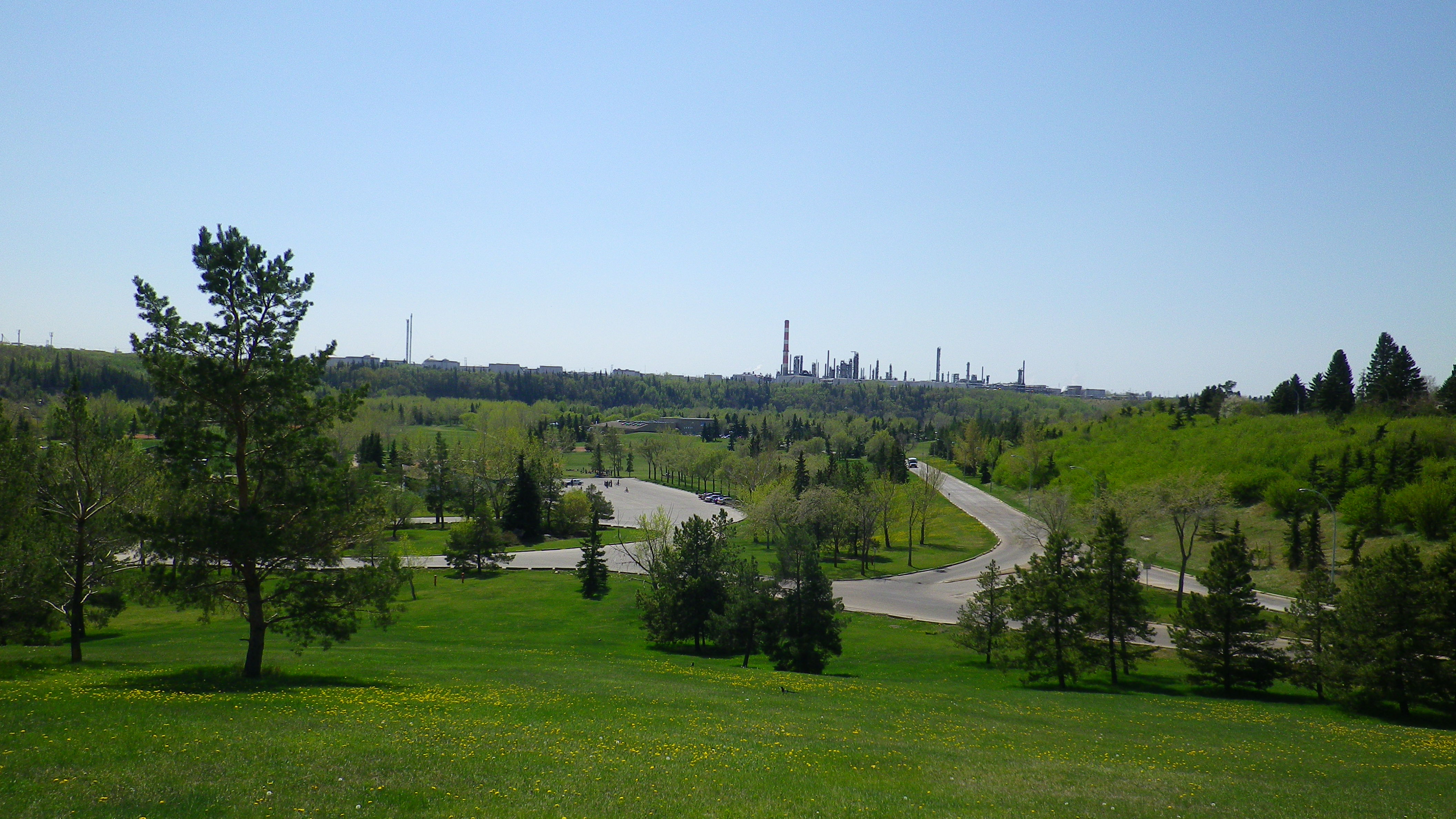
View of Rundle Park in May 2015

In 1907, landscape architect Frederick Todd proposed that the city should take advantage of the natural space provided by the river valley. Acting upon Todd's advice, the City of Edmonton acquired over 100 properties in the river valley to be used as parklands between 1907 and 1931. In 1915, the provincial government adopted a report by Todd to protect the river valley and its associated ravines as a recreational area. In 1933, the City of Edmonton passed a local bylaw to regulate land use and to preserve the river valley as parkland. The city underwent another period where it acquiring private river valley properties from the 1950s to the 1970s. In 1970, the City of Edmonton passed a bylaw that defined the river valley and ravines and regulated developments close to the river valley, and created a long-term policy with the aim to purchase additional river valley lands.

Shortly after the plans for the highway were abandoned in 1974, the provincial government created the Capital City Recreation Park, a park system that encompassed several river valley parks, including the Dawson, Gold Bar, Hermitage, and Rundle parks. During this period, small pieces of land were acquired to complete the trail system planned by the municipal and provincial government; connecting Hermitage Park and the High Level Bridge. The trail system was later extended to other parks in West Edmonton. In 1976, the provincial government also issued Orders-in-Council to restrict developments around the river valley from Devon to Fort Saskatchewan.

In 1985, the city of Edmonton approved the North Saskatchewan River Valley Area Redevelopment Act, offering the river valley parks some form of legal protection; and designating the area an environmental protection area to be used for urban parks.

A plan to unite the various parks that surrounded the North Saskatchewan River in the Edmonton Metropolitan Region was conceived during the early 1990s. In 1996, an ad hoc group of volunteers known as the River Valley Alliance (RVA) was formed from municipalities in the metropolitan area that the river passed through, including Devon, Edmonton, Fort Saskatchewan, Leduc County, Parkland County, Strathcona County, and Sturgeon County; with the aim to connect the riverside parks as a larger park system. The RVA itself was formally incorporated in 2003.

Along with the provincial and federal governments, the RVA led the development of several plans for the park, including a concept plan in 1998, a trail plan in 2000, an updated concept plan in 2003, and a plan of action in 2007. The latter plan is a C$605-million plan to develop a metropolitan park system.

== Parks ==
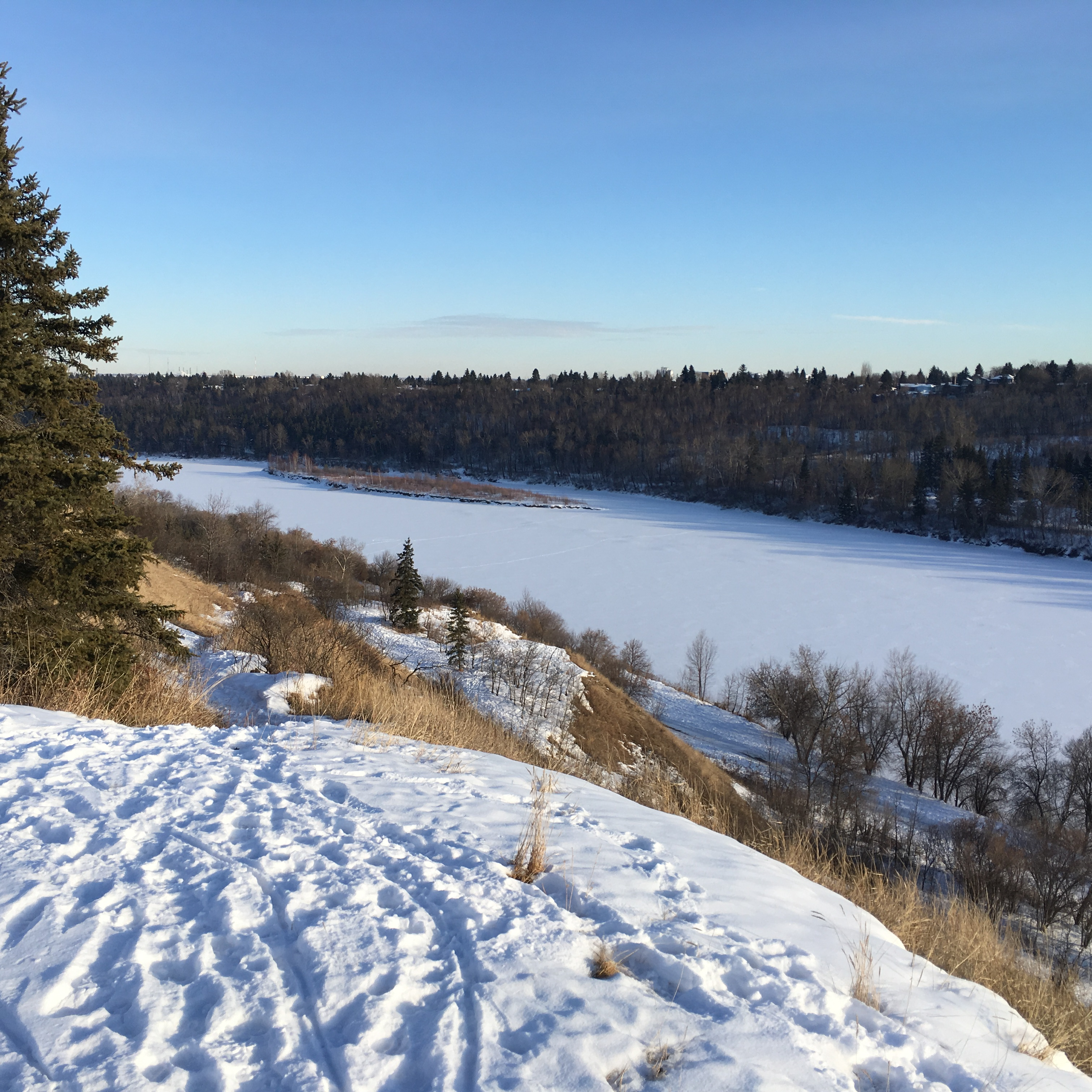
The North Saskatchewan River from Dawson Park, March 2017

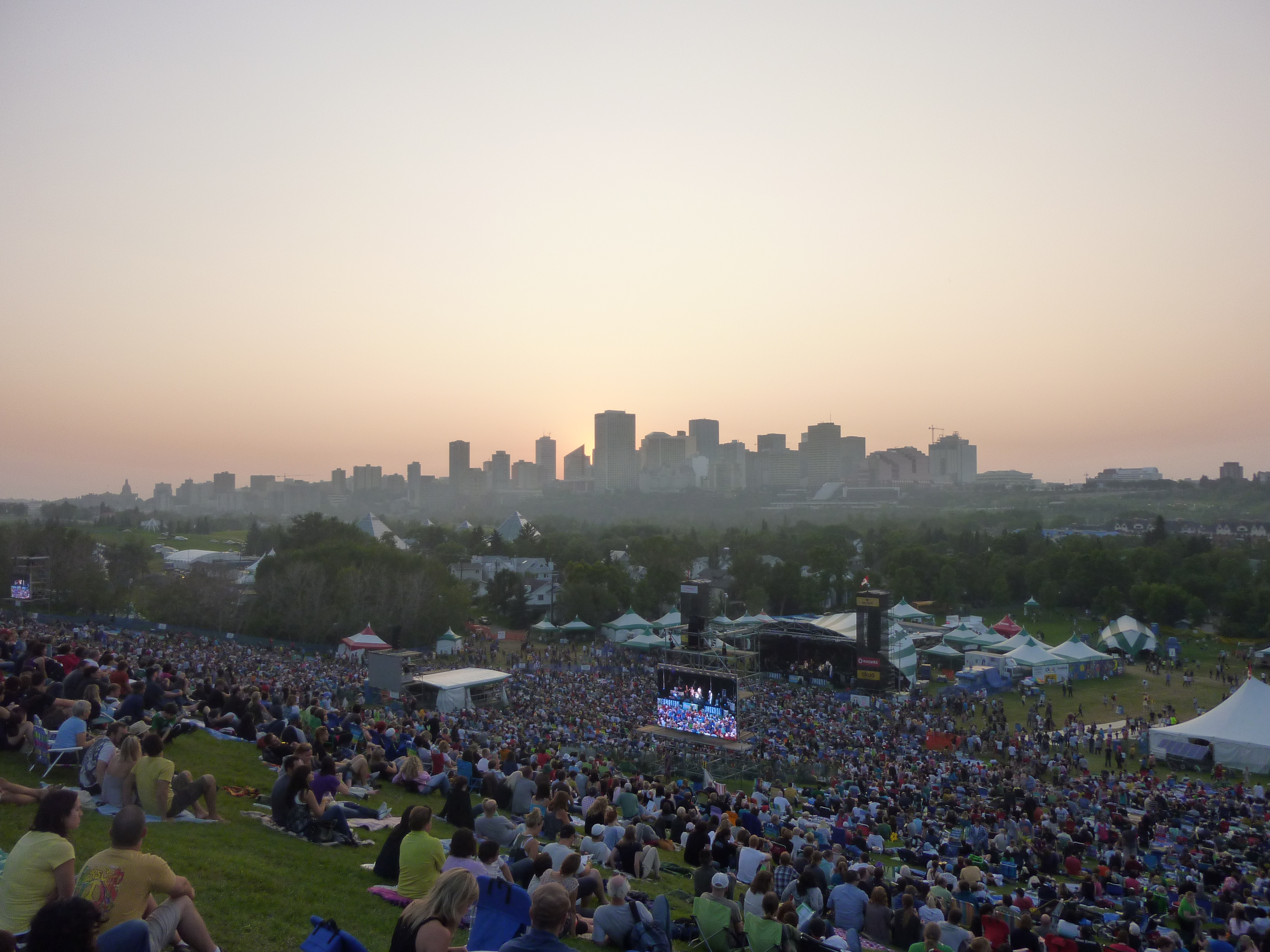
Edmonton Folk Music Festival

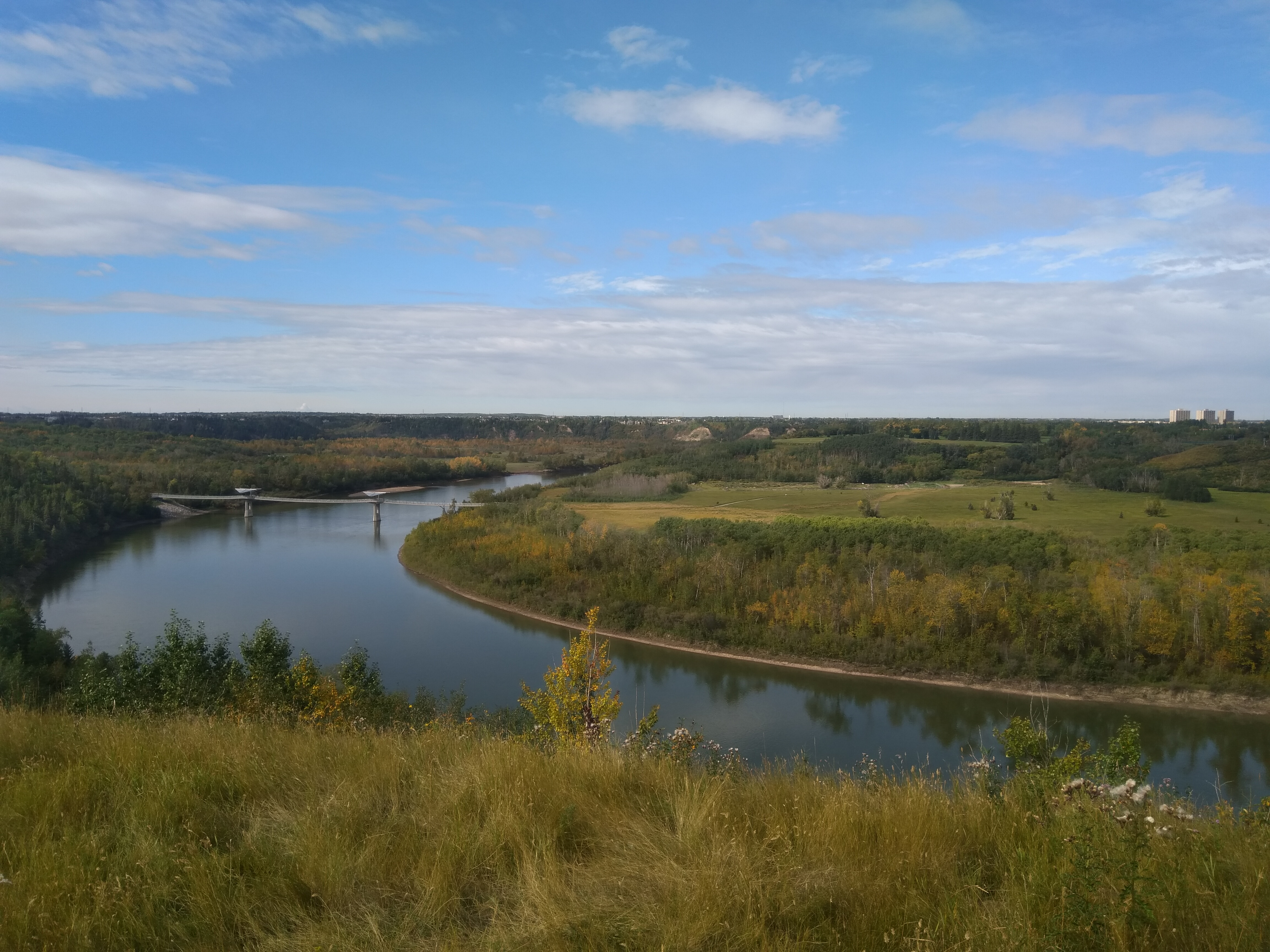
Terwillegar Park in mid-September.

The North Saskatchewan River Valley park system, including its associated ravines, holds over 30 urban parks forming a part of the larger park system. Collectively, these parks form the largest municipally-operated urban park and the largest contiguous area of urban parkland in the country. The park system encompasses over 7,300 hectares (18,000 acres) of land.

Several municipal parks and Strathcona Science Provincial Park form the North Saskatchewan River valley parks system. Municipal parks that form a part of the system include:

- Allan Stein Park
- Argyll Park
- Buena Vista Park
- Capilano Park
- Dawson Park
- Diamond Park
- Emily Murphy Park
- Floden Park
- Forest Heights Park (53.5435°N 113.4598°W): it overlooks the North Saskatchewan River, as well as downtown Edmonton. The park is mostly located in the Forest Heights neighborhood; it contains public tennis courts
- Gallagher Park (53.534°N 113.472°W): It is named after former mayor Cornelius Gallagher and is the site for the annual Edmonton Folk Music Festival.
- Gold Bar Park
- Goldstick Park
- Government House Park
- Henrietta Muir Edwards/Rafters Landing
- Hermitage Park
- Irene Parlby Park
- Kinnaird Park
- Kinsmen Park
- Louise McKinney Riverfront Park
- MacKinnon Ravine Park
- Mill Creek Ravine
- Nellie McClung Park
- Queen Elizabeth Park
- Rio Park
- Riverdale Park
- Rundle Park
- Sir Wilfrid Laurier Park
- Terwillegar Park (53.481°N 113.614°W): located on the east bank of the North Saskatchewan River, and features a large off-leash area, mountain bike and hiking trails, as well as a spot to hand launch canoes into the river.
- Victoria Park
- West River's Edge
- Whitemud Park
- William Hawrelak Park

Among the various municipally-maintained parks in Edmonton, the ones located in the river valley hold the highest availability of washrooms and picnic sites. The majority of the parks in the river valley have trails that connect to other areas of the park system. The river valley also holds a number of recreational facilities including baseball fields, dog parks, playgrounds, slipways, sports fields, and tennis courts. Although there exists a concentration of recreational facilities in the river system, service facilities including equipment rentals and food and beverage facilities remain scarce in the river valley.

As of 2007, it was estimated that 10 million guests visit the river valley annually, making it the second most visited site in Alberta after the West Edmonton Mall. However, concerns were raised that higher visitation rates to the river valley, along with the continued urban developments within it, may cause disruption of local wildlife, and threaten the long-term health of the river valley.

=== Trails ===
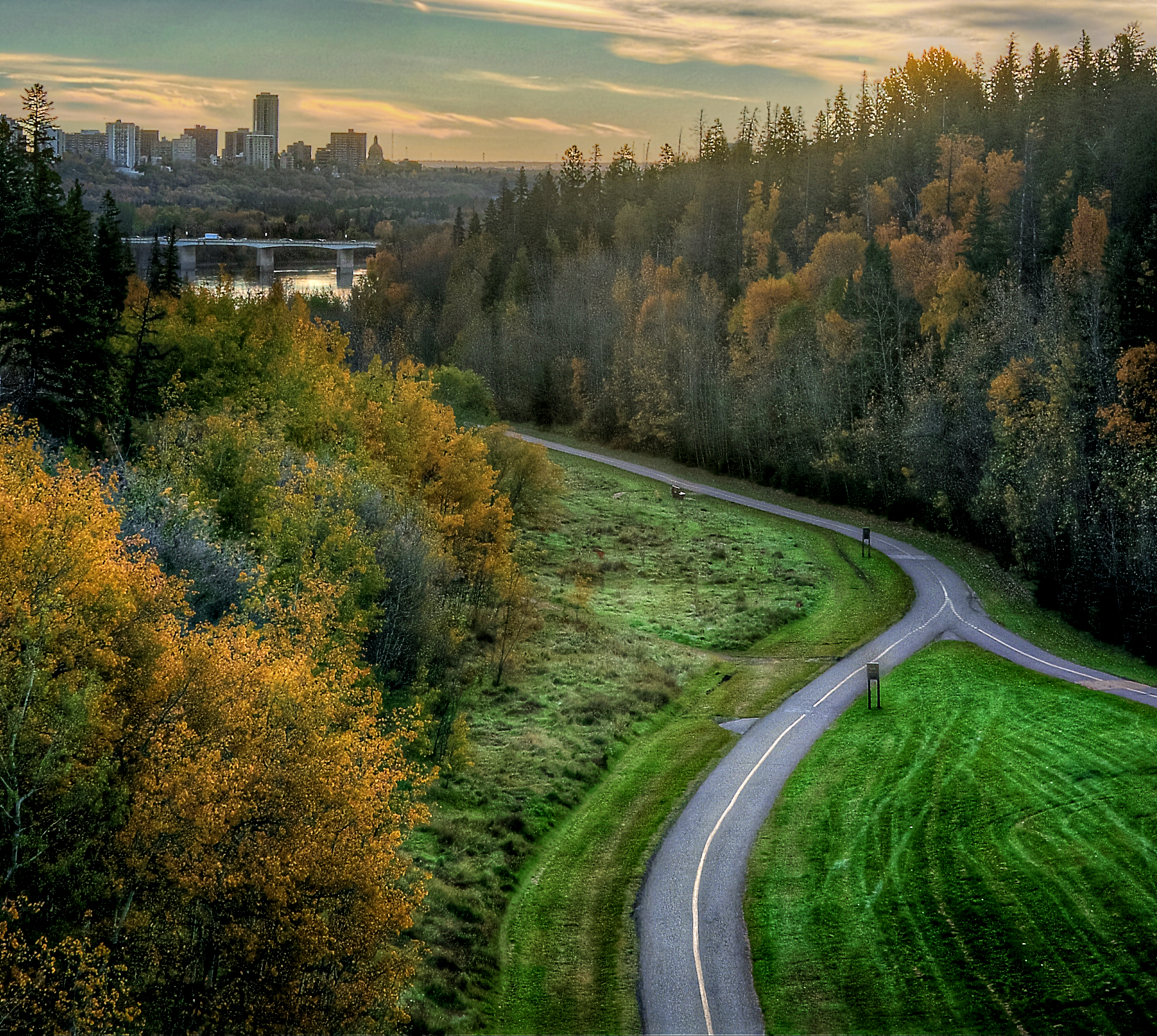
Paved trails at MacKinnon Ravine Park

The river valley holds more than 160 kilometres (99 mi) of maintained trails that loosely connect the parks together. However, only 90.6 kilometres (56.3 mi) of the trails are paved. Portions of the network are disconnected, although the RVA plans to fully connect 75 kilometres (47 mi) of the trail system by 2024. An "overarching name" for the Regional Trail system was devised in 2020 between the RVA and the municipal governments. Several hectares of private land were also acquired by the municipal government in 2008 in order to "bridge the gaps" between the river valley's trail system.

The river itself is also viewed as a water trail for watercraft and serves as the binding feature of the park system. The river's flow rate varies between 160 and 250 m^{3}/s in May to its peak flow of 250–500 m^{3}/s during the summer; making its conditions unsuitable for swimming, although optimal for canoeing, kayaking, and rafting. The river flows across Alberta and Saskatchewan towards Lake Winnipeg and the Nelson River, and eventually into Hudson's Bay.

== Geography ==
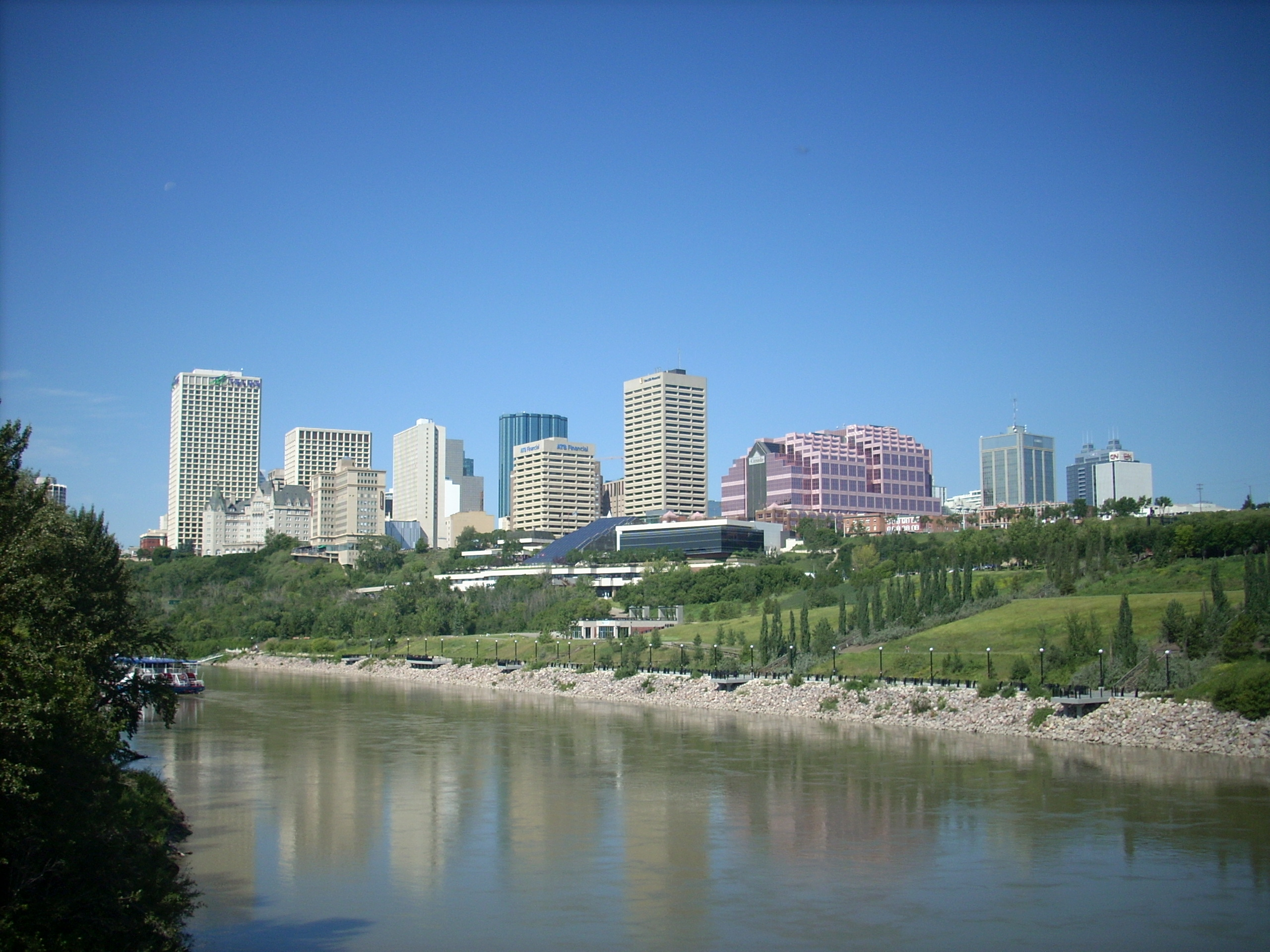
The North Saskatchewan River with downtown Edmonton in the background. The river cuts northeast through the city.

The North Saskatchewan River valley park system extends approximately 88 kilometres (55 mi) and encompasses over 7,300 hectares (18,000 acres) of land; although the river valley itself holds 3,556.4 hectares (8,788 acres) of dedicated parkland. Most of the park system surrounds the North Saskatchewan River, a river that cuts northeast through the Edmonton Metropolitan Region, and through the centre of Edmonton. The course of the river has been modified during the early 20th century as a result of damming, and for transportation purposes. Dams have also been built into the river, with its waters still used for agricultural purposes.

The North Saskatchewan River valley is one of the few remaining natural areas in the region, with other portions of the metropolitan area having been industrialized or urbanized. The river valley has undergone changes due to past human developments; although the depth and slope of the river valley helped to limit the degree of developments within it. Most of the river valley is made up of grasslands although small sections of it are forested. There are 22 ravines associated with the river valley. Within the city of Edmonton, the river valley and its 14 associated ravines cuts at a depth of 100 to 150 metres (330 to 490 ft). Soil flows are not uncommon along the slopes of the unstable river valley. In years with low snow and rainfall, fires are more common.

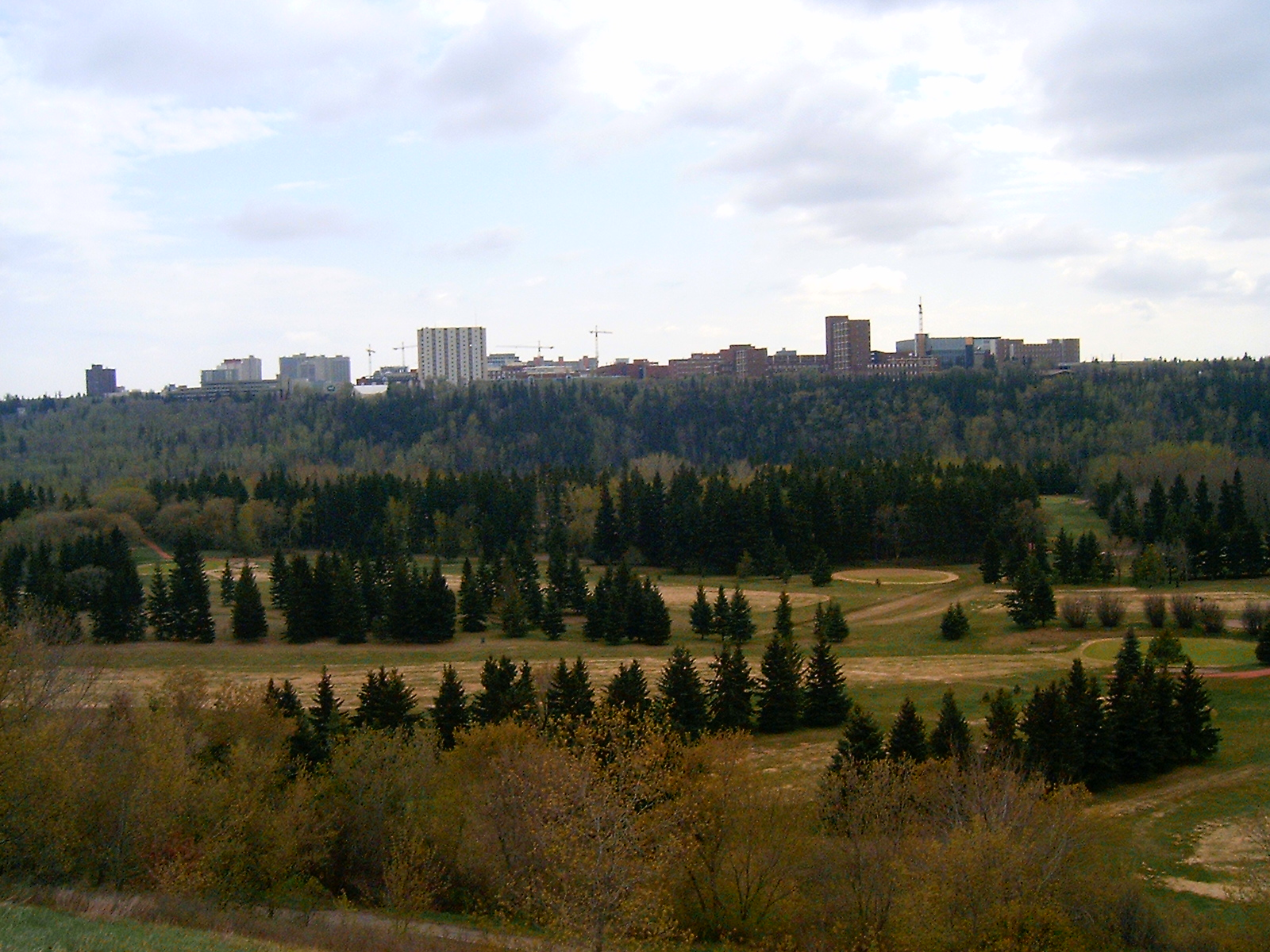
Victoria Golf Course, a municipally-operated golf course in the river valley

Although sections of the river valley are made up of public parks, portions of it are also held under private ownership. As of 2020, the RVA continues to pursue the acquisition of private land around the river valley in order to fulfill the vision of an uninterrupted, connected trail system. Private facilities located in the river valley include EPCOR Utilities' Gold Bar Wastewater Treatment Plant. Additionally there exist several thousand properties and residential homes that are situated within 50 metres (160 ft) of the river valley.

A number of public parks and golf courses are located in the river valley. In addition to its recreational uses, the river valley is also used to provide a number of ecological services, including carbon sequestration, erosion control, and stormwater management. Taken together, it is estimated the river valley provides approximately CA$350 million to $650 million in services to the region per year.

== Fauna and flora ==
The North Saskatchewan River valley helps support a high level of biodiversity. A comprehensive survey of the river valley's fauna and flora does not exist, although it was estimated that there are at least 325 vascular plant species, 50 types of mosses, and 40 lichen species. It is estimated that there are 150 bird species, 50 mammal species, 27 fish species, and seven amphibian and reptile species in the river valley.

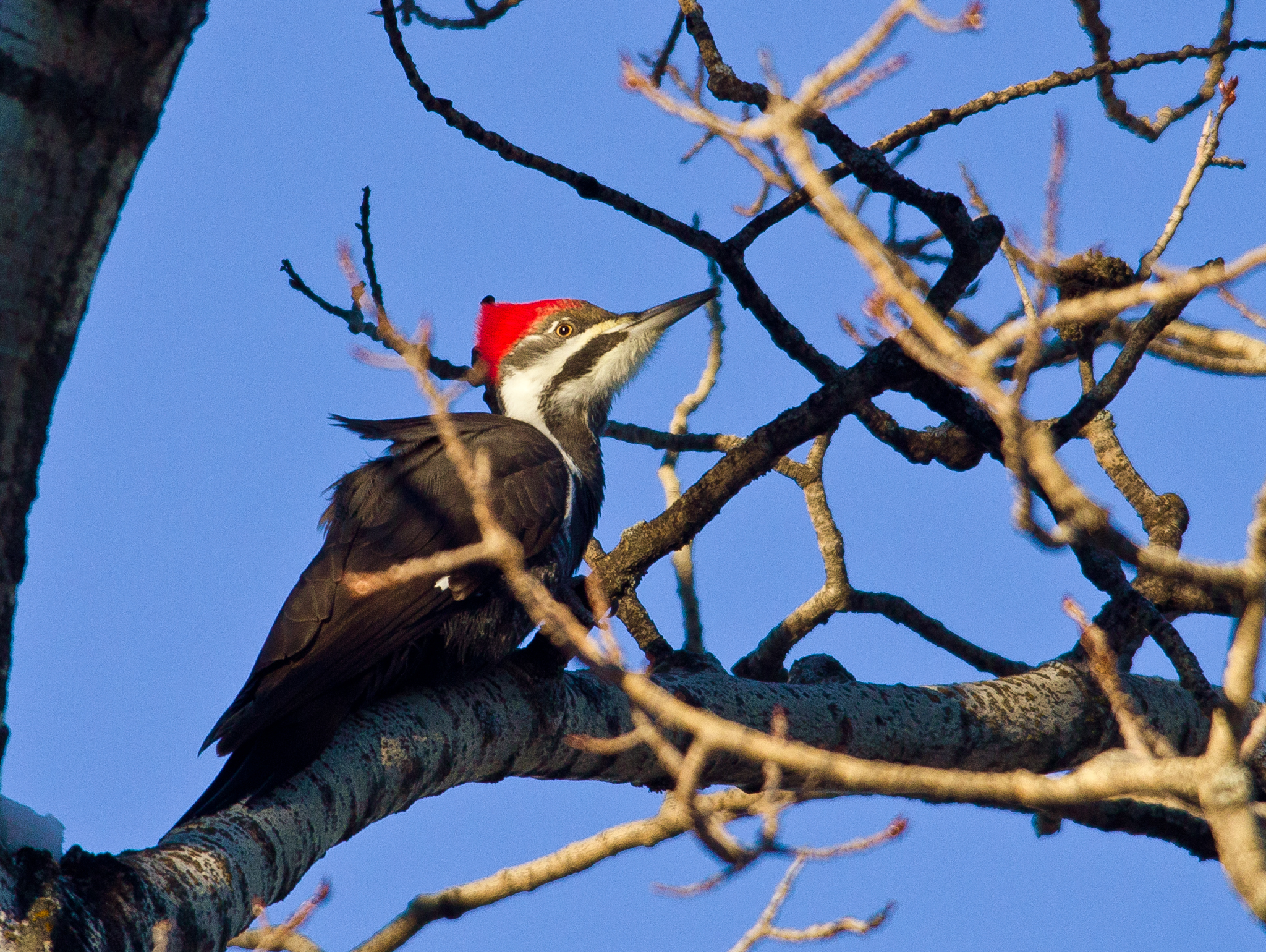
A pileated woodpecker in the North Saskatchewan River valley

The river valley was historically dominated by alder, balsam poplars, and willow trees, although most of these trees were logged during the 19th century. As a result, the majority of the trees that stand in the river valley date after 1900. During this period a number of non-native fruit and vegetable species, shrubs, and trees were introduced into the river system. The river valley presently support a variety of flora such as aspen, balsam poplar, white birch, white spruce, and other types of grassland flora. Forests in the river valley contrast other forests in the region, which are more aspen and balsam poplar-heavy dominant; whereas forests in the river valley typically hold a larger amount of black and white spruces. Other types of plants found in the river valley include poison ivy, and Saskatoon serviceberries. The river valley's riparian zone is primarily made up of wetland habitats with grass, sedges, and willows; although in select areas, the forests will extend to the river's edge.

The river valley serves as a wildlife corridor for animals to travel to other conservation areas. Because the river valley serves as a wildlife corridor, several wildlife crossings were built in locations where highways cross the river valley. Animals commonly found in the river valley includes coyotes, great horned owls, lake sturgeons, North American porcupines, pileated woodpeckers, plains garter snakes, walleye, and white-tailed deer. Cougars that have made their way into Edmonton usually arrive via the river valley system.

== See also ==
- Urban parks in Canada
