= Peter Talbot (politician) =

Canadian politician (1854–1919)

The Honourable Peter Talbot
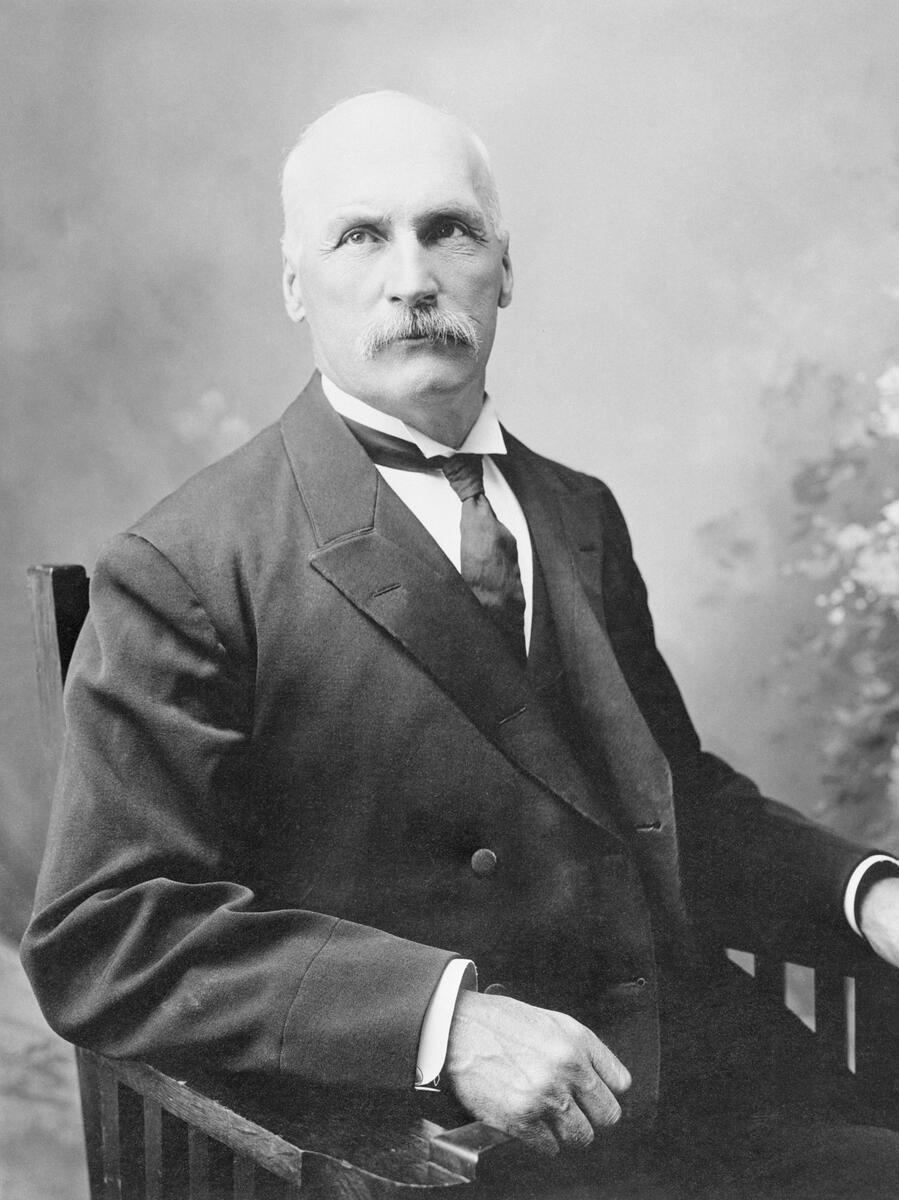

Canadian Senator from Alberta
- In office March 8, 1906 – December 6, 1919
- Nominated by: Wilfrid Laurier
- Appointed by: The Earl Grey

Member of Parliament for Strathcona
- In office November 3, 1904 – March 7, 1906
- Succeeded by: Wilbert McIntyre

Member of the Legislative Assembly of the Northwest Territories for Lacombe
- In office 1902–1904

Personal details
- Born: March 30, 1854 Eramosa, Canada West
- Died: December 6, 1919 (aged 65) Lacombe, Alberta, Canada
- Party: Liberal
- Occupation: teacher, politician

Peter Talbot (March 30, 1854 – December 6, 1919) was a Canadian teacher, parliamentarian and Senator.

== Early life ==
Peter Talbot was born in Eramosa, Canada West (now Ontario) on March 30, 1854, to Henry Talbot and Margaret Stewart. He was educated at Rockwood Academy and later Ottawa Normal School (eventually became part of University of Ottawa), where he received his teacher's first-class certificate. Talbot married Clara Card on January 1, 1879. He moved to Fort Macleod, North-West Territories (NWT), in 1890 to teach school. In 1892, he moved to Lacombe, to homestead and raise cattle. His son, Percy Russell Talbot, was the first Chief Veterinary Inspector for Alberta.

== Political life ==
In 1902 he was elected to the Legislative Assembly of Northwest Territories for Lacombe and served until 1904 as a supporter of the Frederick W. A. G. Haultain government.

In 1904, he was elected to the House of Commons of Canada for the riding of Strathcona as a Liberal. As a Member of Parliament, Talbot was a key figure in Alberta's entrance in Canadian Confederation as a province, advising Laurier on matters, along with Edmonton Liberal Member of Parliament Frank Oliver. Both men were instrumental in assuring Laurier the draft electoral districts for the province were fairly aligned after repeated calls of gerrymandering by southern Albertans. Talbot promoted both Edmonton and Strathcona as the seat of government for the new province of Alberta, going so far to say he would "fight to the finish".

Historian Lewis Thomas argues that Talbot could have been named Alberta's first Premier if he had desired the position. Talbot instead sought a position in the Senate and admitted in letters he did not have the stamina to continue in elected politics, nor the financial resources. Talbot instead recommended Frank Oliver as the first Premier, and after he declined, he recommended Strathcona's NWT Council man Alexander Cameron Rutherford to Laurier, who accepted the proposal. Prior to being named to the Senate, Talbot wrote Rutherford asking that the position of Sheriff of Red Deer be set aside for him.

In 1906, he was appointed to the Senate on the advice of Wilfrid Laurier, representing the senatorial division of the province of Alberta (created 1905 from the North-West Territories).

Talbot was reported ill in December 1919, and died on December 6, 1919, in Lacombe at the age of 65, while serving in the Senate.
