= Wilbert McIntyre =

Canadian politician

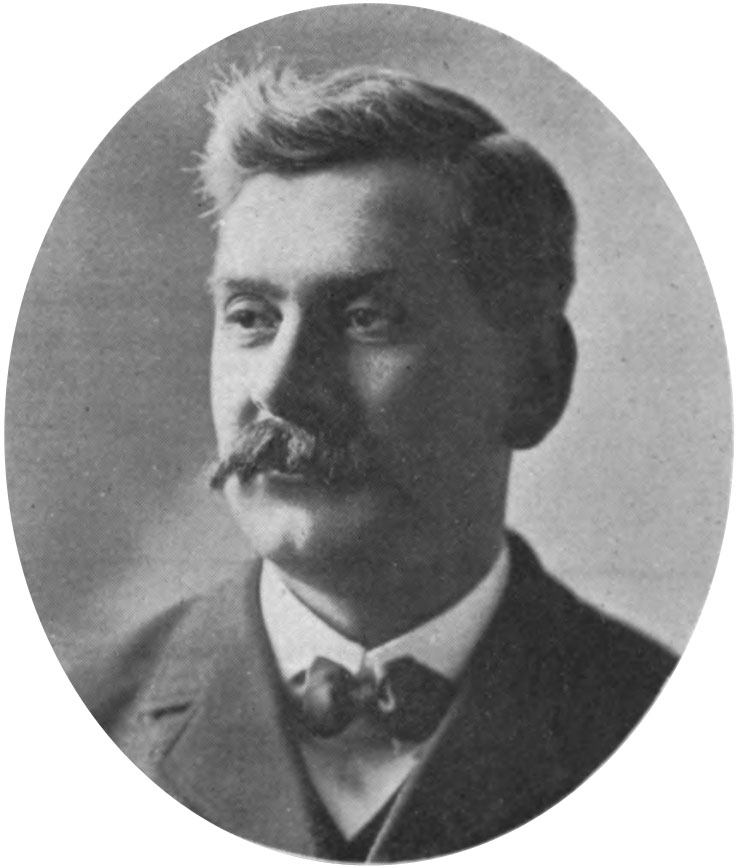

Member of the House of Commons of Canada for Strathcona
- In office 1906–1909
- Preceded by: Peter Talbot
- Succeeded by: James McCrie Douglas

Personal details
- Born: July 15, 1867 Rosedale, Ontario, Canada
- Died: July 21, 1909 (aged 42) Strathcona, Alberta, Canada
- Profession: Doctor

Wilbert McIntyre (July 15, 1867 – July 21, 1909) was a politician and medical doctor from Alberta, Canada. He served as MP for Strathcona, Alberta 1906-1909.

Born in Rosedale, Ontario, he came west in 1902, settling in Strathcona, now part of Edmonton.

Wilbert was elected to the House of Commons of Canada in a 1906 by-election in the Strathcona electoral district by-election on April 5, 1906. He was the first to win a federal seat in Alberta following Alberta being named a province in 1905. He filled the seat left empty by the resignation of Strathcona MP Peter Talbot.

McIntyre was re-elected in the 1908 Canadian federal election. The contest was a three-way race but McIntyre took 18 votes more than his two contenders put together.

He died just a year later vacating his seat on July 21, 1909.

Dr. Wilbert McIntyre park in Edmonton, Alberta is named in his honor.
