= Strathcona (federal electoral district) =

Former electoral district in Canada

Alberta electoral district

Defunct federal electoral district
- Legislature: House of Commons
- District created: 1903
- District abolished: 1925
- First contested: 1904
- Last contested: 1921

Strathcona was a federal electoral district in the North-West Territories and Alberta, Canada, that was represented in the House of Commons of Canada from 1904 to 1925. It was centred on the town (later city) of Strathcona, later a part of Edmonton.

When it was created, the riding was part of the North-West Territories. It was huge as it stretched from the present western boundary of Alberta (at the time the western boundary of the provisional district of Alberta) east well into what is now the province of Saskatchewan. It was wholly on the south side of the North Saskatchewan River, while Edmonton was on the north side.

In 1905, when Saskatchewan and Alberta became provinces, the riding found itself split between them. In 1907, it was redrawn to fall entirely in Alberta, with the Saskatchewan part being transferred to the Battleford riding. Strathcona was abolished in 1925 when it was redistributed between Edmonton East, Edmonton West and two newly created ridings, Vegreville and Wetaskiwin.

The federal riding of Edmonton Strathcona/Edmonton—Strathcona was reborn in 1953. It covers a part of urban Edmonton that had once been in the pre-1924 Strathcona federal riding.

== Members of Parliament ==
=== Members of Parliament ===
This riding has elected the following members of the House of Commons of Canada:

Strathcona
Parliament	Years	Member	Party
10th	1904–1906	Peter Talbot	Liberal
10th	1906–1908	Wilbert McIntyre	Liberal
11th	1908–1909	Wilbert McIntyre	Liberal
11th	1909–1911	James McCrie Douglas	Liberal
12th	1911–1917	James McCrie Douglas	Liberal
13th	1917–1921	James McCrie Douglas	Government (Unionist)
13th	1921–1925	Daniel Webster Warner	Progressive
District dissolved into Vegreville and Wetaskiwin

== Election results ==
1921 Canadian federal election
Party	Candidate	Votes	%	±%
Progressive	Daniel Webster Warner	7,319	64.64	–
Conservative	James McCrie Douglas	2,925	25.84	–38.67
Labour	Rice Sheppard	1,078	9.52	–
Total valid votes		11,322	100.00	
Total rejected ballots		–		
Turnout		11,322	60.83	–33.33
Eligible voters		18,611		
Progressive gain from Government (Unionist)		Swing		–
Source: Library of Parliament

1917 Canadian federal election
Party	Candidate	Votes	%	±%
Government (Unionist)	James McCrie Douglas	5,777	64.51	–0.75
Opposition (Laurier Liberals)	Allan Thomas Mode	3,178	35.49	–
Total valid votes		8,955	100.00	
Total rejected ballots		–		
Turnout		8,955	94.16	+33.96
Eligible voters		9,510		
Government (Unionist) gain from Liberal		Swing		–
Source: Library of Parliament

1911 Canadian federal election
Party	Candidate	Votes	%	±%
Liberal	James McCrie Douglas	5,396	65.26	+14.88
Conservative	George Benjamin Campbell	2,872	34.74	+1.35
Total valid votes		8,268	100.00	
Total rejected ballots		–		
Turnout		8,268	60.20	–
Eligible voters		13,735		
Liberal hold		Swing		+8.12
Source: Library of Parliament

Canadian federal by-election, October 10, 1909 Death of Wilbert McIntyre on July 21, 1909
Party	Candidate	Votes	%
Liberal	James McCrie Douglas	acclaimed	–
Source: Library of Parliament

1908 Canadian federal election
Party	Candidate	Votes	%	±%
Liberal	Wilbert McIntyre	3,130	50.14	–18.28
Conservative	Edgerton W. Day	2,078	33.29	+1.71
Independent	James George Anderson	1,034	16.57	–
Total valid votes		6,242	100.00	
Total rejected ballots		–		
Turnout		6,242	–	
Eligible voters		–		
Liberal hold		Swing		–
Source: Library of Parliament

Canadian federal by-election, April 5, 1906 Peter Talbot's appointment to the Senate, March 8, 1906
Party	Candidate	Votes	%	±%
Liberal	Wilbert McIntyre	2,819	68.42	+2.62
Conservative	Frank W. Crang	1,301	31.58	–0.41
Total valid votes		4,120	100.00	
Total rejected ballots		–		
Turnout		4,120	–	
Eligible voters		–		
Liberal hold		Swing		+1.52
Source: Library of Parliament

1904 Canadian federal election
Party	Candidate	Votes	%
Liberal	Peter Talbot	3,863	65.80
Conservative	Orlando Bush	1,878	31.99
Unknown	J.J. Gregory	130	2.21
Total valid votes		5,871	100.00
Total rejected ballots		–	
Turnout		5,871	65.39
Eligible voters		8,979	
Note: Gregory ran under auspices of the Lacombe-based Farmers Association of Alberta. He spoke in favour of nationalization of the railways, protection for the farmers and government loans to farmers.
Source: Library of Parliament

== See also ==
- List of Canadian electoral districts
- Historical federal electoral districts of Canada
- Strathcona (provincial electoral district)
- Strathcona (N.W.T. electoral district)
