= Rundle Park (Edmonton) =

Municipal park in Edmonton, Canada

Coordinates: 53.56097°N 113.38366°W

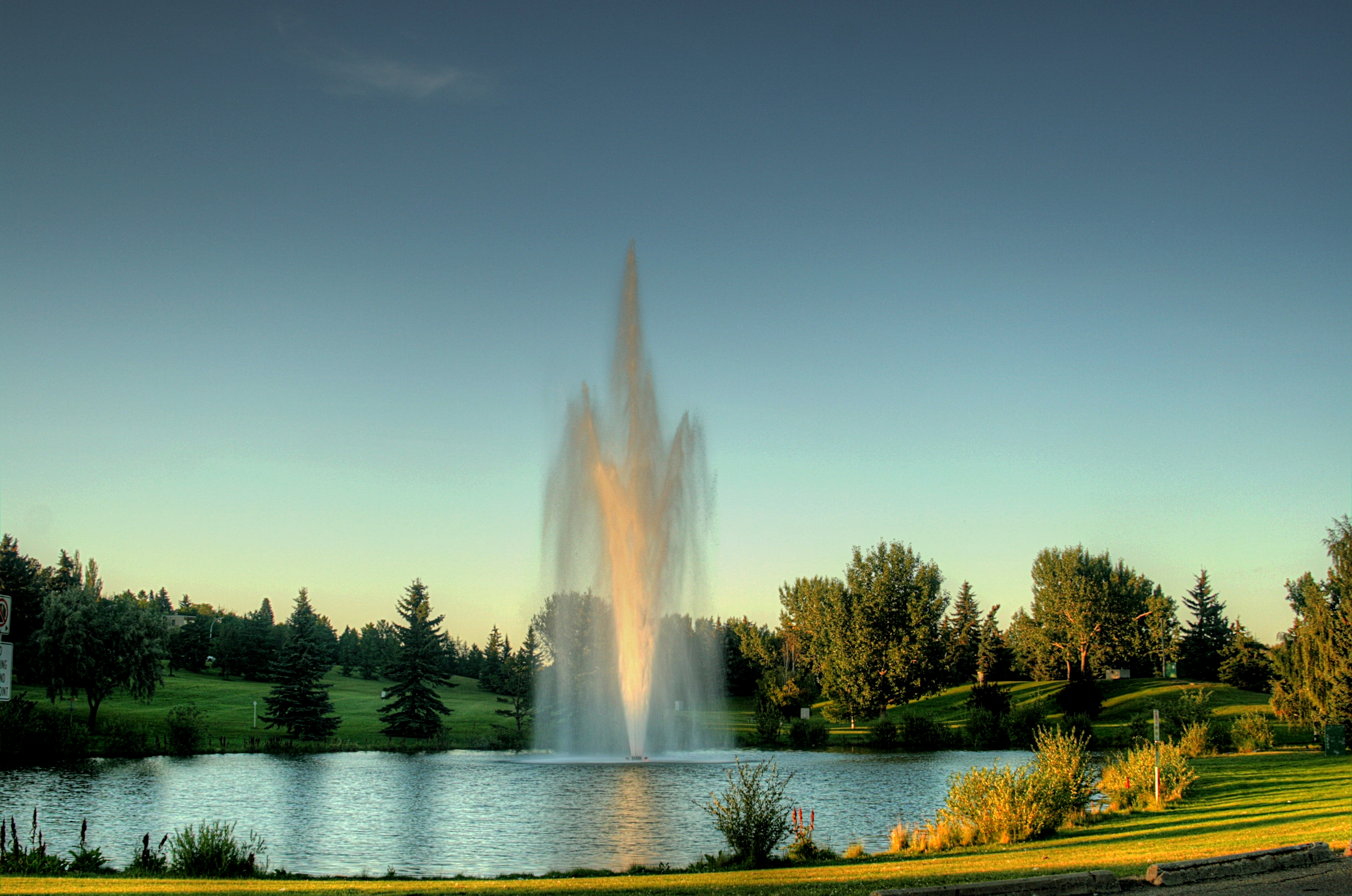
One of Rundle Park's many ponds; this one features a large fountain in the middle.

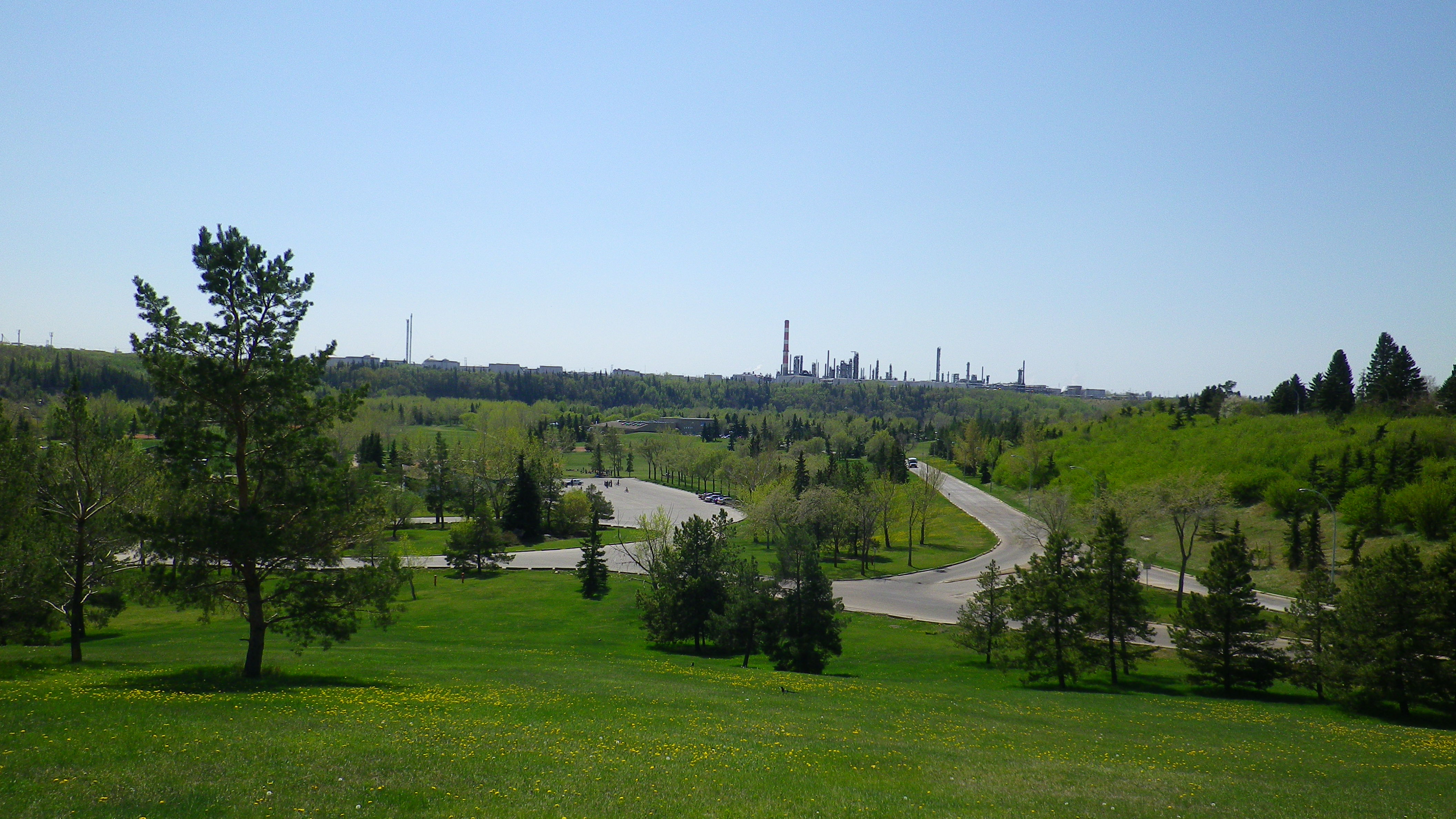
A view towards southwest from a hill in the northern part of Rundle Park.

Rundle Park is a municipal park in Edmonton, Canada, and a major park in the North Saskatchewan River Valley parks system. The park overlooks the North Saskatchewan River, and there is a pedestrian bridge that connects Gold Bar Park and Rundle Park together. The park features paved paths, sport amenities, and numerous ponds.

The Town of Beverly amalgamated with Edmonton in 1961, and portions of Rundle Park were formerly the Town of Beverly’s garbage dump.

== Activities ==
- Disc golf course, with holes dotted around the entire park. It was designed by Steve Mallett and Wally Ovalle in 1980 and later redesigned in 2009 by Steve Mallett. The course is available to the public at no charge, on a first-come, first-served, walk-on basis. It features concrete tee pads and Innova DISCatcher Pro targets.
- Swimming centre
- Green-asphalt tennis courts
- 18-hole par 3 golf course
- Paddleboat rentals, available during the summer
- Soccer fields
- Baseball/softball diamonds
- Hiking trails
- Multi-use trails (paved)
- Tobogganing hill
- Public beach volleyball court
