= Inverary, Ontario =

Inverary
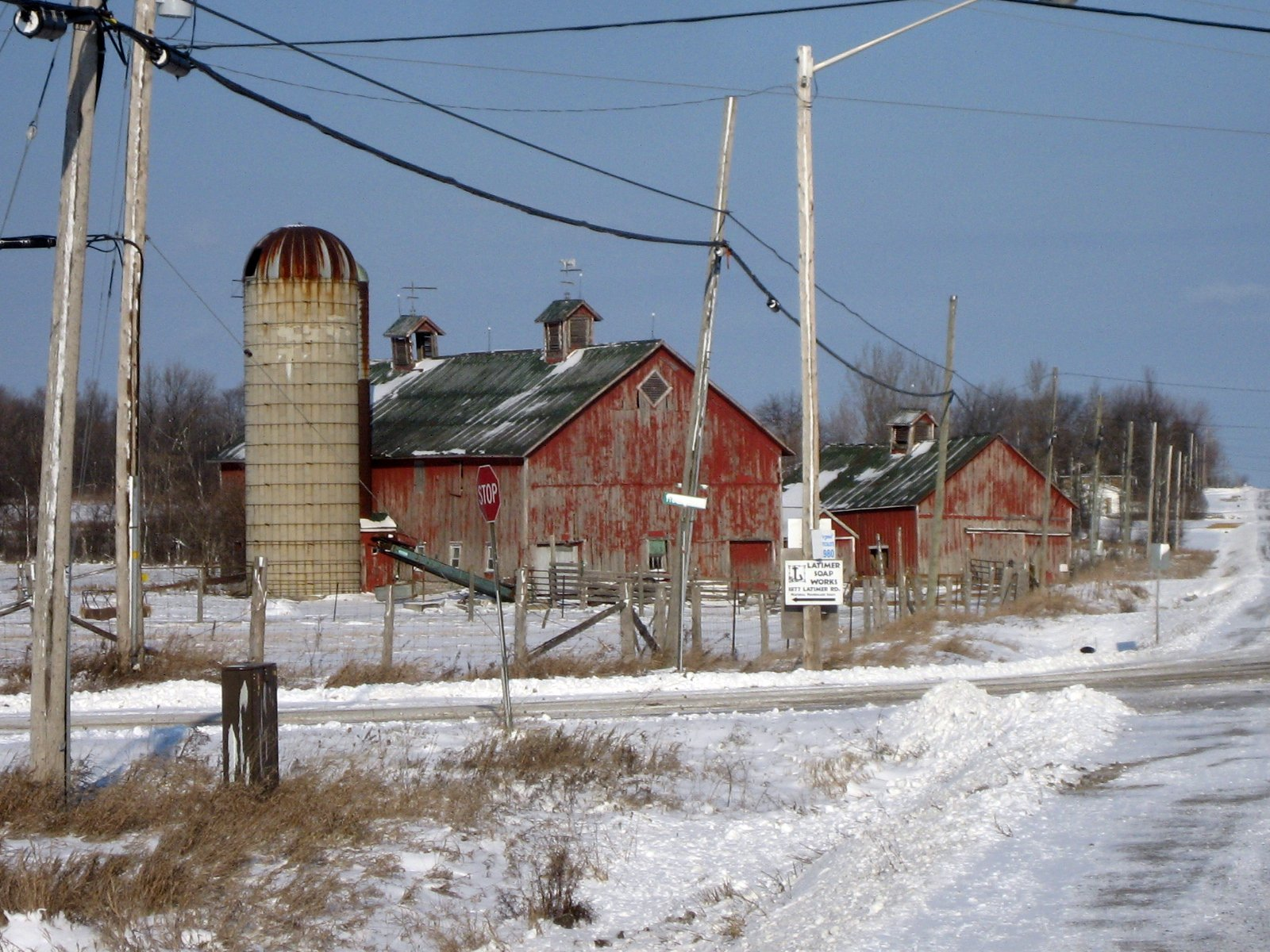

- Location in southern Ontario
- Coordinates: 44°23′17″N 76°28′26″W
- Country: Canada
- Province: Ontario
- County: Frontenac County
- Township: South Frontenac
- Established: 1860
- Named after: named by James Campbell after his ancestral home in Scotland
- Elevation: 154 m (505 ft)
- Time zone: UTC-5 (Eastern Time Zone)
  - Summer (DST): UTC-4 (Eastern Time Zone)
- Postal code: K0H 1X0
- Area code: 613, 343

Inverary is a Compact Rural Community and unincorporated place in South Frontenac, Frontenac County in eastern Ontario, Canada. The community was originally called Storrington post office in 1845, for (the now) geographic Storrington Township in which the community lies. It was renamed to Inverary in 1856 by landowner James Campbell after Inveraray, his ancestral home in Scotland, before being officially incorporated in 1860.

== Education ==
The Limestone District School Board operates two elementary schools in the area: Perth Road Public School and Storrington Public School.

== Postal services ==
A post office at 4048 Perth Road in Inverary has two rural routes, as well as general delivery and post office box service. The postal code for Inverary is K0H 1X0.
