= Gold Bar Park =

Park in Alberta, Canada

Coordinates: 53.556°N 113.405°W

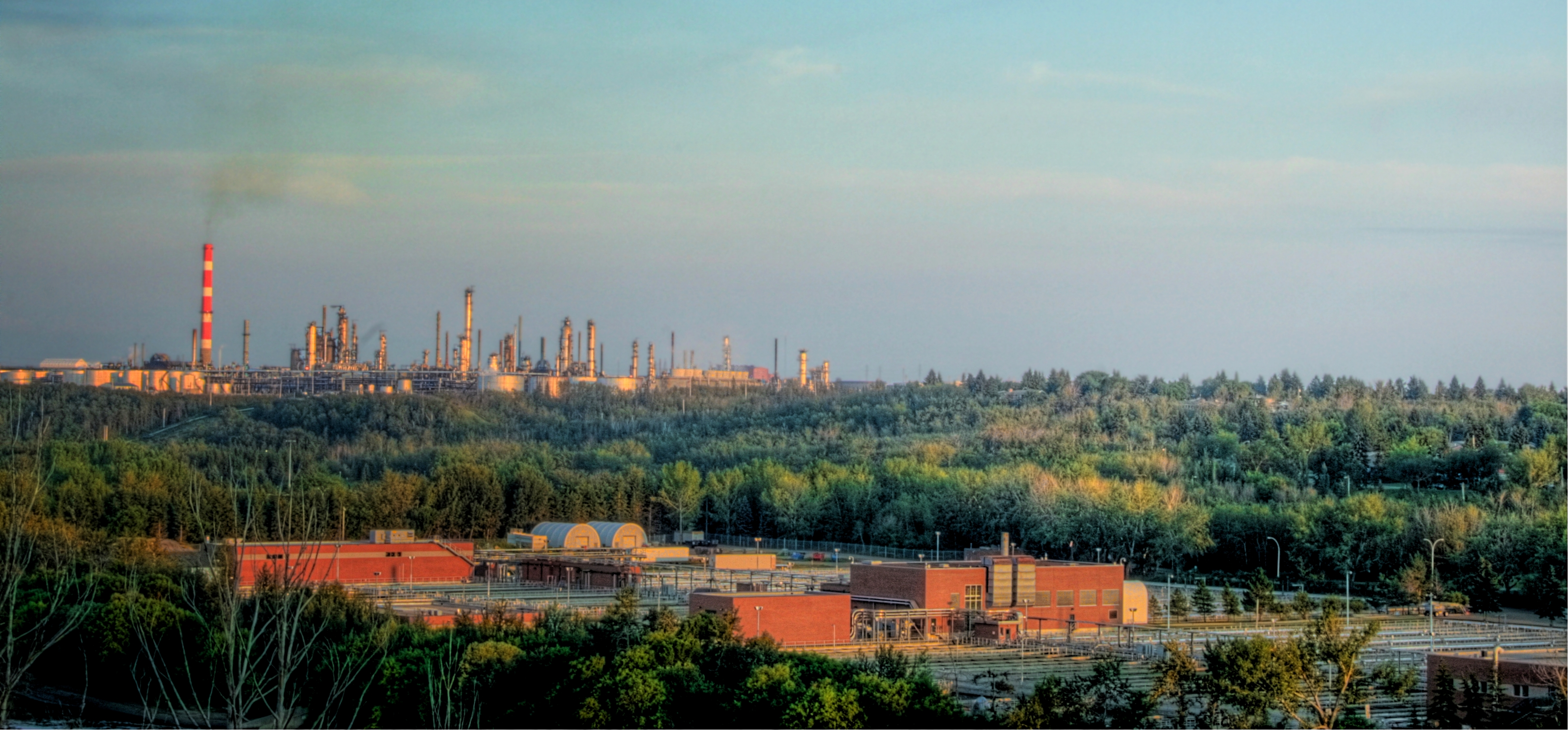
The waste water treatment plant.

Gold Bar Park is a municipal park in Edmonton, Alberta, Canada. A footbridge goes over the North Saskatchewan River and connects Gold Bar Park with Rundle Park.

== Activities ==
- Hiking: The Gold Bar Hiking Trail is located east of the trail to the Rundle Park footbridge.
- Skiing: Large cross-country skiing paths are stationed in the park.
- Walking and biking: Streams to walk across
