= Vernor Smith =

Canadian politician (1864–1932)

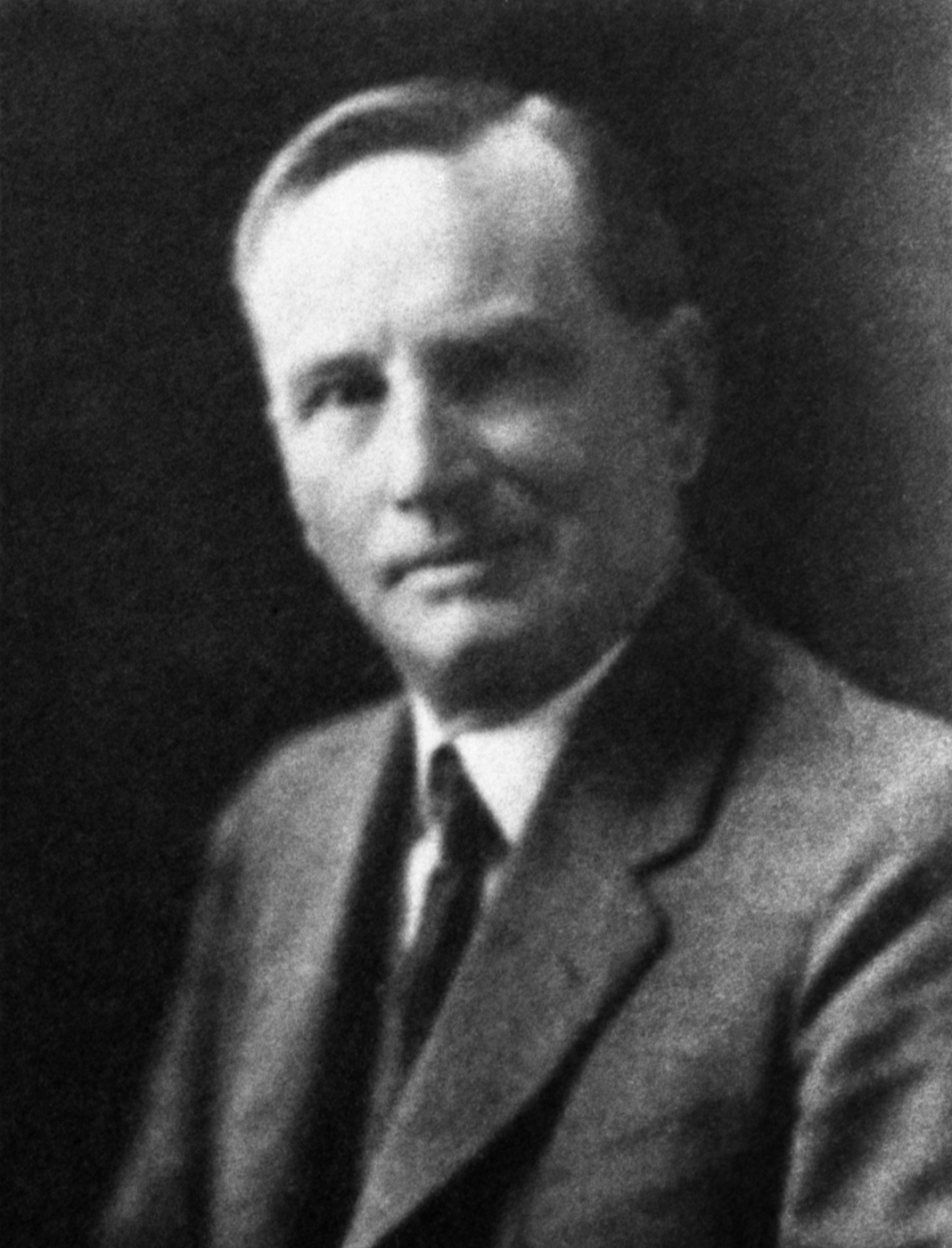

Member of the Legislative Assembly of Alberta
- In office July 18, 1921 – July 19, 1932
- Preceded by: George P. Smith
- Succeeded by: Chester Ronning
- Constituency: Camrose

Alberta Minister of Railways and Telephones
- In office August 31, 1921 – July 19, 1932
- Premier: Herbert Greenfield; John Edward Brownlee
- Preceded by: Charles Stewart
- Succeeded by: George Hoadley (1934)

Personal details
- Born: Vernor Winfield Smith; February 17, 1864 Prince Edward Island
- Died: July 19, 1932 (aged 68) Edmonton, Alberta
- Party: United Farmers of Alberta
- Spouse: Lily Bury
- Relations: Mac DeMarco (great grandson)
- Children: 5
- Occupation: Accountant, farmer

Vernor Winfield Smith (February 17, 1864 – July 19, 1932) was a politician in Alberta, Canada who served as the province's Minister of Railways and Telephones from 1921 until 1932. Born in 1864 in Prince Edward Island, he moved to British Columbia in 1883 where he worked for several railway companies as an accountant. In 1915 he moved to Camrose, Alberta to become a farmer. The same year, he married Lily Bury, with whom he would have five children.

== Career ==
Smith contested the 1921 provincial election in the riding of Camrose for the United Farmers of Alberta (UFA), where he received 56% of the vote and defeated incumbent Liberal George P. Smith. The UFA, which had never before run candidates in an election, won a surprise victory in 1921, and new premier Herbert Greenfield appointed Smith to his cabinet as Minister of Railways and Telephones. In this capacity, Smith was responsible for dealing with a number of money-losing railways, including the Edmonton, Dunvegan and British Columbia Railway (ED&BC), that had fallen into the government's hands as a result of the collapse of the syndicates that had built them. He favoured government ownership of these railways, while Greenfield supported selling them to the Canadian Pacific Railway (CPR). Smith did not like the CPR, and in 1923 publicly accused it of dereliction of duty in relation to a contract it held to recondition the ED&BC; Greenfield apologized to the CPR in the legislature on behalf of the government, opening a rift between him and his minister. One independent member of the legislative assembly speculated that "if the farmer members of the House took a vote between Greenfield and Smith" on the issue, "they would certainly take Smith." Indeed, the issue was one of several leading the UFA to caucus to pressure Greenfield to resign in favour of his Attorney-General, John Edward Brownlee, which he did in 1925.

Resolving the railways question was one of Brownlee's top priorities, and in early 1926 he and Smith travelled to Ottawa, where they met with federal Minister of Railways Charles Avery Dunning in an unsuccessful effort to persuade him that the federal government should take over the railways. Next they travelled to Montreal, where they reached an agreement with the Royal Bank of Canada (RBC) to acquire its shares in the ED&BC, originally valued at $2 million, for $1.3 million; this gave the government full ownership of the railway and the flexibility to sell, lease, or operate it without requiring the consent of the RBC. Still in Montreal, Brownlee and Smith made offers to sell the railway to both the CPR and the Canadian National Railway (CNR). Neither was interested, and on returning to Edmonton, Smith repeated his recommendation for direct government operation of the railways. Brownlee proved more receptive to the idea than Greenfield had, and the government appointed John Callaghan—a business acquaintance of Smith's and a successful railway contractor—as Superintendent of Railways. Callaghan was successful in converting the railways to profit-making ventures, and in 1928 one of the smaller lines, the Lacombe and North Western, was sold to the CPR for $1.5 million. The following year, the CPR purchased all remaining lines for $25 million.

Vernor Smith was re-elected in the 1926 and 1930 elections, and remained Minister of Railways and Telephones. On July 19, 1932, Smith dropped dead at his Edmonton home while preparing to meet his family at his summer cottage at Pigeon Lake. He had been suffering from angina pectoris for years and had succumbed to the condition.

Vernor Smith's great grandson is musician Mac DeMarco, whose birth name—Vernor Winfield McBriare Smith IV—was chosen in honour of the elder Smith.

== Electoral record ==
1921 Alberta general election: Camrose
Party	Candidate	Votes	%	±%
United Farmers	Vernor Smith	3,040	55.97%	+19.78% (Note: United Farmers swing is compared to the Nonpartisan League result in the 1917 by-election.)
Liberal	George P. Smith	2,391	44.03%	-19.78%
Total valid votes		5,431	100.00%	
Eligible voters / turnout		6,282	86.45%	+14.04% (Note: Turnout is compared to the 1917 general election.)
United Farmers gain from Liberal		Swing		+19.78%
Source(s) "Election results for Camrose, 1921". Alberta Online Encyclopedia.

Alberta provincial by-election, December 9, 1921: Camrose
Party	Candidate	Votes
United Farmers	Vernor Smith	Acclaimed
Source(s) Source: "Past By-Elections". Elections Alberta.

1926 Alberta general election: Camrose
Party	Candidate	Votes	%	±%
United Farmers	Vernor Smith	2,872	71.96%	+15.99%
Liberal	W. A. Cunningham	567	14.21%	-29.82
Conservative	J. A. Code	300	7.52%	
Liberal–Progressive	A. D. Campbell	252	6.31%	
Total valid votes		3,991	100.00%	
Eligible voters / turnout		6,847	58.29%	-28.16%
United Farmers hold		Swing		+22.91%
Source(s) "Election results for Camrose, 1926". Alberta Online Encyclopedia.

1930 Alberta general election: Camrose
Party	Candidate	Votes	%	±%
United Farmers	Vernor Smith	3,137	58.07%	-13.89%
Liberal	S. M. Westvick	2,086	41.93%	+27.72%
Total valid votes		5,223	100.00%	
Rejected, spoiled and declined		179		
Eligible voters / turnout		6,914	78.13%	+19.84%
United Farmers hold		Swing		-20.81%
Source(s) "Election results for Camrose, 1930". Alberta Online Encyclopedia.
