= Wetaskiwin-Camrose =

Defunct provincial electoral district in Alberta, Canada

Coordinates: 53.02°N 113.13°W

Alberta electoral district
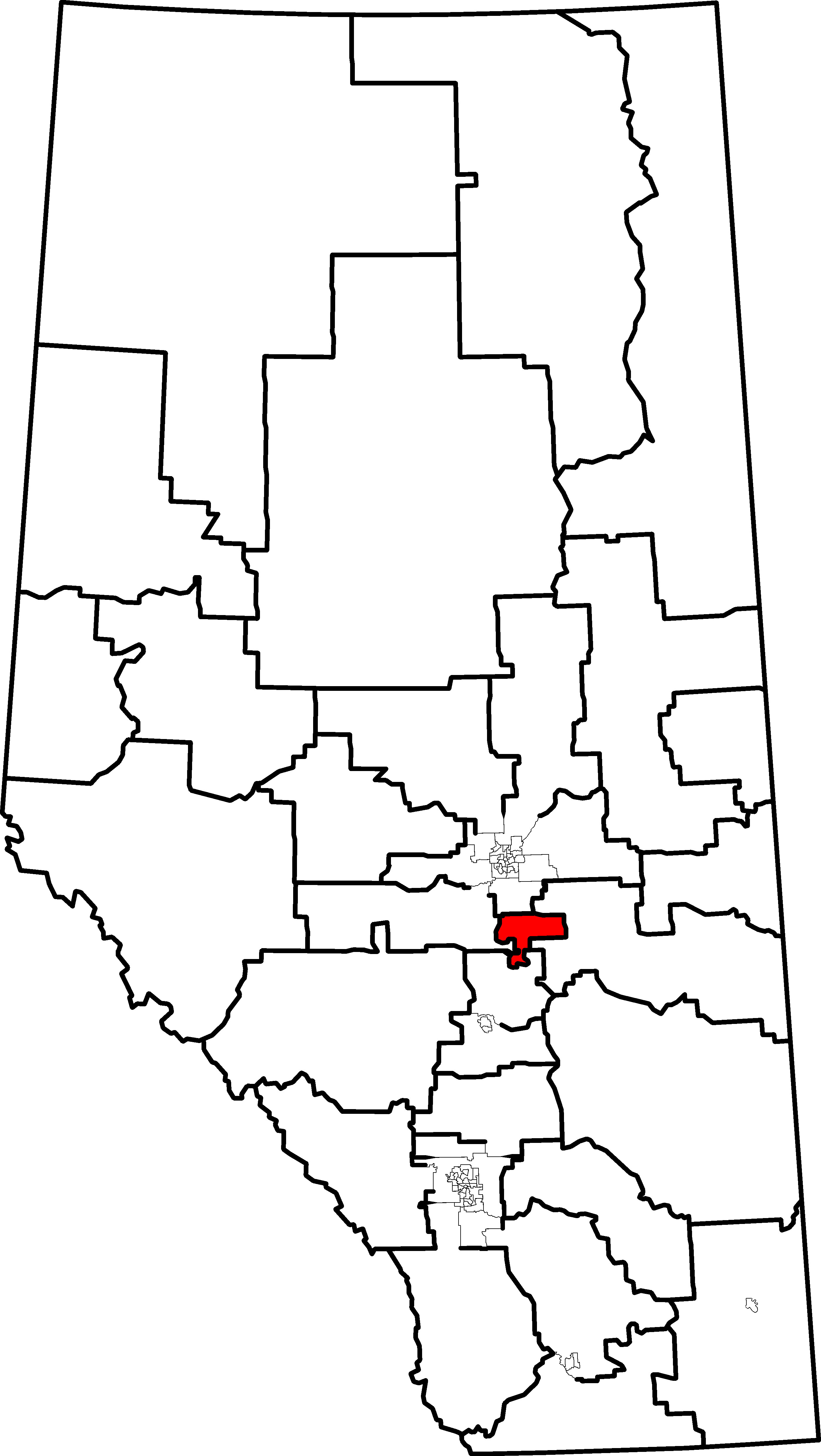
- 2004 boundaries

Defunct provincial electoral district
- Legislature: Legislative Assembly of Alberta
- District created: 1993
- District abolished: 2019
- First contested: 1993
- Last contested: 2015

Wetaskiwin-Camrose was a provincial electoral district in Alberta, Canada, mandated to return a single member to the Legislative Assembly of Alberta using first past the post method of voting from 1993 to 2019.

== History ==
The district was created in the 1993 boundary re-distribution from the Wetaskiwin-Leduc and Camrose districts. It is located in rural central eastern Alberta. It includes its namesakes Wetaskiwin and Camrose as well as the town of Millet and the Samson 137 and Montana 139 Indian reserves.

The district and its antecedents had been favourable to electing Progressive Conservative candidates for the past few decades, however, this changed in the 2015 Alberta general election when New Democratic Bruce Hinkley who won his first term.

The 2010 electoral boundary re-distribution saw a portion of land lying east of the city of Camrose transferred in the Battle River-Wainwright electoral district.

The Wetaskiwin-Camrose electoral district was dissolved in the 2017 electoral boundary re-distribution, and portions of the district would form the newly created Camrose and Maskwacis-Wetaskiwin electoral districts.

=== Boundary history ===
82 Wetaskiwin-Camrose 2003 boundaries
Bordering districts
North	East	West	South
Leduc-Beaumont-Devon	Battle River-Wainwright	Drayton Valley-Calmar	Lacombe-Ponoka
riding map goes here			
Legal description from the Statutes of Alberta 2003, Electoral Divisions Act.
Starting at the centre line of Highway 2 and the north boundary of Twp. 47; then 1. east along the north boundary of Twp. 47 to the east boundary of Sec. 3 in Twp. 48, Rge. 25 W4; 2. north along the east boundary of Sec. 3 to the north boundary of Sec. 2; 3. east along the north boundary of Secs. 2 and 1 in Rge. 25 W4 and Secs. 6, 5, 4, 3, 2 and 1 in Rges. 24 W4 and 23 W4 and Secs. 6, 5, 4, 3 and 2 in Rge. 22 W4 to the east boundary of Sec. 2 in Twp. 48, Rge. 22 W4; 4. south along the east boundary to the north boundary of Twp. 47; 5. east along the north boundary to the east boundary of Rge. 19 W4 (Highway 834); 6. south along the east boundary of Rge. 19 W4 to the north boundary of Twp. 45; 7. west along the north boundary of Twp. 45 to the east boundary of Sec. 32, Twp. 45, Rge. 23 W4; 8. south along Secs. 32, 29, 20, 17, 8 and 5 to the north boundary of Twp. 44, Rge. 23 W4 at its intersection with the northeast corner of the Samson Indian Reserve No. 137; 9. southerly, westerly, northerly and easterly along the boundaries of the Samson Indian Reserve No. 137 and Montana Indian Reserve No. 139 to the north boundary of Twp. 44 at its intersection with the east boundary of Ermineskin Indian Reserve No. 138 (including the western part of the Samson Indian Reserve No. 137); 10. west, north and westerly along the boundaries of Indian Reserve No. 138 and Louis Bull Indian Reserve No. 138B to the north boundary of Sec. 30, Twp. 45, Rge. 26 W4; 11. west along the north boundary of Sec. 30 in Rge. 25 W4 and Sec. 25 in Rge. 26 W4 to the centre line of Highway 2; 12. north along the centre line to the starting point.
Note:

86 Wetaskiwin-Camrose 2010 boundaries
Bordering districts
North	East	West	South
Leduc-Beaumont	Battle River-Wainwright	Drayton Valley-Devon	Lacombe-Ponoka
Legal description from the Statutes of Alberta 2010, Electoral Divisions Act.
Note:

Members of the Legislative Assembly for Wetaskiwin-Camrose
Assembly	Years	Member	Party
See Camrose 1909-1993 and Wetaskiwin-Leduc 1971-1993
23rd	1993-1997	Ken Rostad	Progressive; Conservative
24th	1997-2001	LeRoy Johnson	Progressive; Conservative
25th	2001-2004	LeRoy Johnson	Progressive; Conservative
26th	2004-2008	LeRoy Johnson	Progressive; Conservative
27th	2008–2012	Verlyn Olson	Progressive; Conservative
28th	2012-2015	Verlyn Olson	Progressive; Conservative
29th	2015–2019	Bruce Hinkley	New Democrat
See Camrose and Maskwacis-Wetaskiwin after 2019

=== Electoral history ===
The electoral district was created in the 1993 boundary redistribution. The election held that year saw incumbent Camrose MLA Ken Rostad run in the new electoral district. He picked up the new seat for the Progressive Conservative party facing a strong challenge from Liberal candidate Bob Prestage.

Rostad retired at dissolution of the assembly in 1997. His replacement in the legislature was Progressive Conservative candidate LeRoy Johnson. He won the district with a landslide to hold it for his party. He was re-elected to a second term in the 2001 general election with a bigger majority. He won a third term in office in 2004 and retired at the end of his third term in 2008. Progressive Conservative Verlyn Olson who was elected to his first term in the 2008 general election and second term in 2012, before losing to New Democratic Bruce Hinkley in the 2015 election.

== Legislative election results ==
=== 1993 ===
1993 Alberta general election
Party	Candidate	Votes	%	±%
Progressive Conservative	Ken Rostad	6,297	46.01%	–
Liberal	Bob Prestage	4,962	36.26%	–
New Democratic	Bruce Hinkley	1,597	11.67%	–
Social Credit	Henry Neumann	829	6.06%	–
Total		13,685	–	–
Rejected, spoiled and declined		26	–	–
Eligible electors / turnout		21,364	64.18%	–
Progressive Conservative pickup new district.				
Source(s) Source: "Wetaskiwin-Camrose Official Results 1993 Alberta general election". Alberta Heritage Community Foundation.

=== 1997 ===
1997 Alberta general election
Party	Candidate	Votes	%	±%
Progressive Conservative	LeRoy Johnson	7,244	58.56%	12.54%
New Democratic	Rick Jantz	2,060	16.65%	4.98%
Social Credit	Karen Richert	1,622	13.11%	7.05%
Liberal	Jody Saddleback	1,166	9.43%	-26.83%
Forum	Bruce Hinkley	279	2.26%	–
Total		12,371	–	–
Rejected, spoiled and declined		36	–	–
Eligible electors / turnout		21,968	56.48%	-7.70%
Progressive Conservative hold		Swing		16.07%
Source(s) Source: "Wetaskiwin-Camrose Official Results 1997 Alberta general election". Alberta Heritage Community Foundation.

=== 2001 ===
2001 Alberta general election
Party	Candidate	Votes	%	±%
Progressive Conservative	LeRoy Johnson	9,090	72.36%	13.80%
Liberal	Stewart Larkin	1,671	13.30%	3.88%
New Democratic	Philip Penrod	1,420	11.30%	-5.35%
Independent	Ben Lussier	382	3.04%	–
Total		12,563	–	–
Rejected, spoiled and declined		19	–	–
Eligible electors / turnout		22,866	55.02%	-1.45%
Progressive Conservative hold		Swing		8.57%
Source(s) Source: "Wetaskiwin-Camrose Official Results 2001 Alberta general election". Alberta Heritage Community Foundation.

=== 2004 ===
2004 Alberta general election
Party	Candidate	Votes	%	±%
Progressive Conservative	LeRoy Johnson	6,177	54.65%	-17.70%
Liberal	Keith Elliott	2,713	24.00%	10.70%
Alberta Alliance	Dale Trefz	1,194	10.56%	–
New Democratic	Clay Lawson	909	8.04%	-3.26%
Social Credit	Janice H. Wolter	309	2.73%	–
Total		11,302	–	–
Rejected, spoiled and declined		41	–	–
Eligible electors / turnout		24,198	46.88%	-8.15%
Progressive Conservative hold		Swing		-14.20%
Source(s) Source: "Wetaskiwin-Camrose Official Results 2004 Alberta general election". Alberta Heritage Community Foundation.

=== 2008 ===
2008 Alberta general election
Party	Candidate	Votes	%	±%
Progressive Conservative	Verlyn Olson	7,726	65.89%	11.23%
Liberal	Keith Elliott	1,646	14.04%	-9.97%
New Democratic	Sarah E. Mowat	1,078	9.19%	1.15%
Wildrose	Tyler Knelsen	818	6.98%	–
Green	Midge Lambert	458	3.91%	–
Total		11,726	–	–
Rejected, spoiled and declined		37	–	–
Eligible electors / turnout		27,652	42.54%	-4.34%
Progressive Conservative hold		Swing		10.60%
Source(s) Source: "Wetaskiwin-Camrose Official Results 2008 Alberta general election". Elections Alberta.

=== 2012 ===
2012 Alberta general election
Party	Candidate	Votes	%	±%
Progressive Conservative	Verlyn Olson	7,486	52.25%	-13.63%
Wildrose	Trevor Miller	4,562	31.84%	24.87%
New Democratic	Bruce Hinkley	1,586	11.07%	1.88%
Liberal	Owen Chubb	501	3.50%	-10.54%
Evergreen	Mike Donnelly	191	1.33%	–
Total		14,326	–	–
Rejected, spoiled, and declined		77	–	–
Eligible electors / turnout		28,173	51.12%	8.58%
Progressive Conservative hold		Swing		-15.72%
Source(s) Source: "Wetaskiwin-Camrose Official Results 2012 Alberta general election". Elections Alberta.

=== 2015 ===
2015 Alberta general election
Party	Candidate	Votes	%	±%
New Democratic	Bruce Hinkley	7,531	43.87%	32.80%
Progressive Conservative	Verlyn Olson	5,951	34.67%	-17.59%
Wildrose	Bill Rock	3,685	21.47%	-10.38%
Total		17,167	–	–
Rejected, spoiled and declined		76	–	–
Eligible electors / turnout		31,527	54.69%	3.57%
New Democratic gain from Progressive Conservative		Swing		-5.60%
Source(s) Source: "Wetaskiwin-Camrose Official Results 2015 Alberta general election". Elections Alberta.

== Senate nominee election results ==
=== 2004 ===
2004 Senate nominee election results: Wetaskiwin-Camrose				Turnout 45.79%	
Affiliation	Candidate	Votes	% votes	% ballots	Rank
Progressive Conservative	Cliff Breitkreuz	4,092	14.80%	46.08%	3
Progressive Conservative	Betty Unger	4,064	14.69%	45.77%	2
Progressive Conservative	Bert Brown	4,032	14.58%	45.41%	1
Independent	Link Byfield	2,879	10.41%	32.42%	4
Alberta Alliance	Michael Roth	2,399	8.67%	27.02%	7
Progressive Conservative	David Usherwood	2,396	8.66%	26.98%	6
Progressive Conservative	Jim Silye	2,275	8.23%	25.62%	5
Alberta Alliance	Vance Gough	2,020	7.30%	22.75%	8
Alberta Alliance	Gary Horan	1,967	7.11%	22.15%	10
Independent	Tom Sindlinger	1,533	5.55%	17.26%	9
Total votes		27,657	100%		
Total ballots		8,880	3.12 votes per ballot		
Rejected, spoiled and declined		2,201			

Voters had the option of selecting four candidates on the ballot.

== Student vote results ==
=== 2004 ===
Participating schools
Camrose Composite High School
Ecole Parkdale School
Ecole Queen Elizabeth Junior High
Griffith Scott School
Our Lady of Mount Pleasant Jr./Sr. High
Sacred Heart School
Wetaskiwin Composite High School

On November 19, 2004, a student vote was conducted at participating Alberta schools to parallel the 2004 Alberta general election results. The vote was designed to educate students and simulate the electoral process for persons who had not yet reached the legal majority. The vote was conducted in 80 of the 83 provincial electoral districts with students voting for actual election candidates. Schools with a large student body that reside in another electoral district had the option to vote for candidates outside of the electoral district than where they were physically located.

2004 Alberta student vote
Affiliation	Candidate	Votes	%
Progressive Conservative	LeRoy Johnson	477	48.33%
NDP	Clay Lawson	213	21.58%
Liberal	Keith Elliott	190	19.25%
Alberta Alliance	Dale Trefz	64	6.48%
Social Credit	Monika Schaefer	43	4.36%
Total		987	100%
Rejected, spoiled and declined		35	

=== 2012 ===
2012 Alberta student vote results
Affiliation	Candidate	Votes	%
Progressive Conservative	Verlyn Olson		%
Wildrose	Trevor Miller		
Liberal	Owen Chubb		%
NDP	Bruce Hinkley		%
Evergreen	Mike Donnelly		
Total			100%

== See also ==
- List of Alberta provincial electoral districts
- Camrose, Alberta, a city in central Alberta
- Wetaskiwin, Alberta, a city in central Alberta
