= Camrose (provincial electoral district) =

Provincial electoral district in Alberta, Canada

Coordinates: 53.09°N 112.77°W

Alberta electoral district
- Camrose within Alberta (2017 boundaries).

Provincial electoral district
- Legislature: Legislative Assembly of Alberta
MLA
Jackie Lovely
United Conservative
- District created: 1909
- District abolished: 1993
- District re-created: 2017
- First contested: 1909, 2019
- Last contested: 1989, 2023

Demographics
- Population (2016): 44,082
- Area (km²): 10,636
- Pop. density (per km²): 4.1

Camrose is a provincial electoral district in Alberta, Canada. The district is one of 87 districts mandated to return a single member (MLA) to the Legislative Assembly of Alberta using the first past the post method of voting.

The Camrose electoral district is represented by Jackie Lovely of the United Conservative Party of Alberta.

The district was originally created in 1909 and dissolved in 1993, and was re-created for the 2019 Alberta general election. From 1924 to 1956, the district used instant-runoff voting to elect its MLA.

== Geography ==
The district is named for its main population centre, Camrose. Its boundaries have been adjusted many times since its creation in 1909, when it was carved from the eastern parts of Wetaskiwin and Ponoka. Between 1993 and 2019, the city of Camrose was transferred to the new district of Wetaskiwin-Camrose, and the surrounding areas were transferred to several neighbouring districts.

The new incarnation of the district, re-created in the 2017 redistribution, includes most of Camrose County, all of Flagstaff County, and all of Beaver County. Over two-fifths of the district's population lives in the City of Camrose. It includes the communities of Camrose, Bawlf, New Norway, Bashaw, Daysland, Rosalind, Ferintosh, Tofield, Round Hill, Kingman, and Ohaton.

== Representation history ==
=== 1909–1993 ===
Members of the Legislative Assembly for Camrose
Assembly	Years	Member	Party
See Wetaskiwin and Ponoka 1905-1909
2nd	1909-1913	George P. Smith	Liberal
3rd	1913-1917	George P. Smith	Liberal
4th	1917-1921	George P. Smith	Liberal
5th	1921-1926	Vernor Smith	United Farmers
6th	1926-1930	Vernor Smith	United Farmers
7th	1930-1932	Vernor Smith	United Farmers
7th	1932	Vacant	
7th	1932-1935	Chester Ronning	United Farmers
8th	1935-1937	William Chant	Social Credit
8th	1937-1940	William Chant	Independent
9th	1940	David B. Mullen	Social Credit
9th	1940-1941	Vacant	
9th	1941-1944	Chester Sayers	Social Credit
10th	1944-1948	Chester Sayers	Social Credit
11th	1948-1952	Chester Sayers	Social Credit
12th	1952-1955	Chester Sayers	Social Credit
13th	1955-1959	Chester Sayers	Social Credit
14th	1959-1963	Chester Sayers	Social Credit
15th	1963-1967	Chester Sayers	Social Credit
16th	1967-1971	Chester Sayers	Social Credit
17th	1971-1975	Gordon Stromberg	Progressive; Conservative
18th	1975-1979	Gordon Stromberg	Progressive; Conservative
19th	1979-1982	Gordon Stromberg	Progressive; Conservative
20th	1982-1986	Gordon Stromberg	Progressive; Conservative
21st	1986-1989	Ken Rostad	Progressive; Conservative
22nd	1989-1993	Ken Rostad	Progressive; Conservative
See Wetaskiwin-Camrose 1993-2019
30th	2019-2023	Jackie Lovely	United Conservative
31st	2023-present	Jackie Lovely	United Conservative

The new district was picked up by the governing Liberals in 1909, with George P. Smith serving as MLA for three terms. In his final term, he was appointed Minister of Education. In 1921, the United Farmers of Alberta swept most of rural Alberta from the Liberals, and Smith was soundly defeated by Vernor Smith (of no relation). He was appointed Minister of Railways and Telephones in the new government. Easily re-elected for two more terms, Smith stayed on as Minister until his sudden death in 1932. The resulting by-election delivered future Co-operative Commonwealth Federation leader Chester Ronning to the Legislature, although at the time he was still a member of the United Farmers.

The 1935 election again saw the government swept from power, and Ronning was defeated by Social Credit candidate William Chant. In the tumultuous early years of William Aberhart's government, Chant was appointed Minister of Agriculture but resigned as Minister and left the party in 1937. He did not run for re-election in 1940.

Social Credit MLA for Edmonton (and Chant's replacement as Agriculture Minister) David B. Mullen decided to run in Camrose in 1940, recapturing the district in a razor-thin contest against Chester Ronning, now running as a CCF candidate. Mullen died suddenly the same year. Ronning ran again in the resulting by-election, but the district was held by Social Credit once again with Chester Sayers becoming MLA. He would become the district's longest-serving representative, winning re-election seven times (although remaining a backbencher throughout his career). He retired from politics at the Legislature's dissolution after his eighth term. Camrose would again vote with a change in government in 1971, sending Progressive Conservative candidate Gordon Stromberg to the Legislature. He served four terms as MLA, also remaining a backbencher.

The district's final representative was PC Ken Rostad. He soundly defeated Western Canada Concept leader Jack Ramsay to enter the Legislature in 1986, and was appointed Solicitor General by premier Don Getty. He was re-elected in 1989 but was shuffled out of cabinet by new premier Ralph Klein in 1992. Camrose was abolished in 1993, and Rostad went on to become MLA for Wetaskiwin-Camrose.

=== Current district ===
The district was re-created by the Electoral Boundaries Commission in 2017 and was contested in the 2019 Alberta general election. United Conservative Party candidate Jackie Lovely, a self-employed saleswoman defeated the six other candidates capturing 15,587 votes, 65 per cent of electors. Her nearest competitor New Democratic Party candidate Morgan Bamford, a municipal-indigenous relations consultant, captured 4,387 votes, good for 18 per cent of the vote.

Jackie Lovely was re-elected at the 2023 Alberta general election with a reduced majority.

== Election results ==
=== 1909 ===
1909 Alberta general election
Party	Candidate	Votes	%
Liberal	George P. Smith	1,010	55.16%
Conservative	I.W.T. McEachern	821	44.84%
Total valid votes		1,831	100.00%
Eligible voters / Turnout		2,363	77.48%
Liberal pickup new district.			
Source(s) Alberta Heritage Foundation. "Election results for Camrose". Archived from the original on December 8, 2010.

=== 1910s ===
1913 Alberta general election
Party	Candidate	Votes	%	±%
Liberal	George P. Smith	1,651	86.89%	+31.73%
Conservative	R.L. Rushton	249	13.11%	-31.73%
Total valid votes		1,900	100.00%	
Eligible voters / Turnout		2,852	66.62%	-10.86%
Liberal hold		Swing		+31.73%
Source(s) Alberta Heritage Foundation. "Election results for Camrose". Archived from the original on December 8, 2010.

1917 Alberta general election
Party	Candidate	Votes	%	±%
Liberal	George P. Smith	2,258	65.22%	-21.67%
Conservative	Frank P. Layton	1,204	34.78%	+21.67%
Total valid votes		3,462	100.00%	
Eligible voters / Turnout		4,781	72.41%	+5.79%
Liberal hold		Swing		-21.67%
Source(s) Alberta Heritage Foundation. "Election results for Camrose". Archived from the original on December 8, 2010.

Alberta provincial by-election, November 9, 1917 Upon the appointment of G. P. Smith as Provincial Secretary
Party	Candidate	Votes	%	±%
Liberal	George P. Smith	2,089	63.81%	-1.41%
Nonpartisan League	J. Miner	1,185	36.19%	
Total valid votes		3,274	100.00%	
Liberal hold		Swing		-18.80%
Source(s) Elections Alberta. "By-elections". Elections Alberta.

=== 1920s ===
1921 Alberta general election
Party	Candidate	Votes	%	±%
United Farmers	Vernor Smith	3,040	55.97%	+19.78% (Note: United Farmers swing is compared to the Nonpartisan League result in the 1917 by-election.)
Liberal	George P. Smith	2,391	44.03%	-19.78%
Total valid votes		5,431	100.00%	
Eligible voters / turnout		6,282	86.45%	+14.04% (Note: Turnout is compared to the 1917 general election.)
United Farmers gain from Liberal		Swing		+19.78%
Source(s) "Election results for Camrose, 1921". Alberta Online Encyclopedia.

Alberta provincial by-election, December 9, 1921
Party	Candidate	Votes
United Farmers	Vernor Smith	Acclaimed
Source(s) Source: "Past By-Elections". Elections Alberta.

1926 Alberta general election
Party	Candidate	Votes	%	±%
United Farmers	Vernor Smith	2,872	71.96%	+15.99%
Liberal	W. A. Cunningham	567	14.21%	-29.82
Conservative	J. A. Code	300	7.52%	
Liberal–Progressive	A. D. Campbell	252	6.31%	
Total valid votes		3,991	100.00%	
Eligible voters / turnout		6,847	58.29%	-28.16%
United Farmers hold		Swing		+22.91%
Source(s) "Election results for Camrose, 1926". Alberta Online Encyclopedia.

=== 1930s ===
1930 Alberta general election
Party	Candidate	Votes	%	±%
United Farmers	Vernor Smith	3,137	58.07%	-13.89%
Liberal	S. M. Westvick	2,086	41.93%	+27.72%
Total valid votes		5,223	100.00%	
Rejected, spoiled and declined		179		
Eligible voters / turnout		6,914	78.13%	+19.84%
United Farmers hold		Swing		-20.81%
Source(s) "Election results for Camrose, 1930". Alberta Online Encyclopedia.

Alberta provincial by-election, October 25, 1932 Upon the death of V. Smith
Party	Candidate	Votes	%	±%
United Farmers	Chester Ronning	2,526	45.06%	-13.01%
Liberal	S. M. Westvick	1,979	35.30%	-6.63%
Conservative	F. P. Layton	1,101	19.64%	
Total valid votes		5,606	100.00%	
United Farmers hold		Swing		-3.19%
Source(s) Elections Alberta. "By-elections". Elections Alberta.

Because the election was held using instant-runoff voting, the vote count entailed a second round of counting. In the second round, Ronning was elected with 2813 votes to Westvick's 2414.

1935 Alberta general election
Party	Candidate	Votes	%	±%
Social Credit	William Chant	4,335	64.04%	
Liberal	J. T. Johnson	1,395	20.61%	-14.69%
United Farmers	Chester Ronning	1,039	15.35%	-29.71%
Total valid votes		6,769	100.00%	
Rejected, spoiled, and declined		142		
Eligible voters / Turnout		7,966	86.76%	+8.63 (Note: Turnout is compared to 1930 general election.)
Social Credit gain from United Farmers		Swing		+39.37%
Source(s) Alberta Heritage Foundation. "Election results for Camrose". Archived from the original on December 8, 2010.

=== 1940s ===
1940 Alberta general election
Party	Candidate	Votes	%	±%
Social Credit	David B. Mullen	2,472	44.90%	-19.14%
Co-operative Commonwealth	Chester Ronning (Note: Personal swing (calculated from Ronning's 1935 result as a United Farmers candidate).)	1,550	28.15%	+12.80%
Independent	J. D. Neville	1,484	26.95%	
Second count (Note: Second-round swing reflects vote share gained from the first count. Overall swing is calculated from the first count only.)
Social Credit	David B. Mullen	2,582	50.73%	+5.83%
Co-operative Commonwealth	Chester Ronning	2,508	49.27%	+21.12%
Exhausted ballots		416		
Total valid votes		5,506	100.00%	
Rejected, spoiled, and declined		167		
Eligible voters / Turnout		7,343	77.26%	-9.50%
Social Credit hold		Swing		-15.97%
Source(s) Alberta Heritage Foundation. "Election results for Camrose". Archived from the original on December 8, 2010.

Alberta provincial by-election, February 6, 1941 Upon the death of D. B. Mullen
Party	Candidate	Votes	%	±%
Social Credit	Chester Sayers	2,419	56.47%	+11.57%
Co-operative Commonwealth	Chester Ronning	1,865	43.53%	+15.38%
Total valid votes		4,284	100.00%	
Social Credit hold		Swing		-1.91%
Source(s) Elections Alberta. "By-elections". Elections Alberta.

1944 Alberta general election
Party	Candidate	Votes	%	±%
Social Credit	Chester Sayers	2,763	55.53%	-0.94%
Co-operative Commonwealth	C.E. Boulter	1,590	31.95%	-11.58%
Independent Progressive	William Chant	623	12.52%	
Total valid votes		4,976	100.00%	
Rejected, spoiled and declined		26		
Eligible voters / Turnout		6,941	72.06%	-5.20%
Social Credit hold		Swing		+5.32%
Source(s) "Camrose results 1944". Alberta Heritage Community Foundation.

1948 Alberta general election
Party	Candidate	Votes	%	±%
Social Credit	Chester Sayers	3,041	56.75%	+1.22%
Co-operative Commonwealth	Charles E. Boulter	1,315	24.54%	-7.42%
Liberal	Alexander E. Burgess	1,003	18.72%	
Total valid votes		5,359	100.00%	
Rejected, spoiled and declined		237		
Eligible voters / Turnout		7,858	71.21%	-0.85%
Social Credit hold		Swing		+4.32%
Source(s) Alberta Heritage Foundation. "Election results for Camrose". Archived from the original on December 8, 2010.

=== 1950s ===
1952 Alberta general election
Party	Candidate	Votes	%	±%
Social Credit	Chester Sayers	2,919	57.62%	+0.87%
Co-operative Commonwealth	Archie Olstad	1,132	22.35%	-2.19%
Liberal	George Bauer	1,015	20.04%	+1.32%
Total valid votes		5,066	100.00%	
Rejected, spoiled and declined		294		
Eligible voters / Turnout		8,229	65.14%	-6.08%
Social Credit hold		Swing		+1.53%
Source(s) Alberta Heritage Foundation. "Election results for Camrose". Archived from the original on December 8, 2010.

1955 Alberta general election
Party	Candidate	Votes	%	±%
Social Credit	Chester Sayers	2,899	47.81%	-9.81%
Liberal	Ed Schnell	2,214	36.51%	+16.48%
Co-operative Commonwealth	Archie Olstad	734	12.10%	-10.24%
Conservative	Charles McCleary	217	3.58%	
Final count
Social Credit	Chester Sayers	3,081	52.77%	+4.96%
Liberal	Ed Schnell	2,758	47.23%	+35.13%
Exhausted ballots		225		
Total valid votes		6,064	100.00%	
Rejected, spoiled and declined		285		
Eligible voters / Turnout		8,786	72.26%	7.13%
Social Credit hold		Swing		-13.14%
Source(s) Alberta Heritage Foundation. "Election results for Camrose". Archived from the original on December 8, 2010.

1959 Alberta general election
Party	Candidate	Votes	%	±%
Social Credit	Chester Sayers	3,229	53.22%	+5.42%
Progressive Conservative	John E. Stuart	1,638	27.00%	+23.42%
Liberal	Stanley Ross Gould	732	12.07%	-24.45%
Co-operative Commonwealth	Archie Olstad	468	7.71%	-4.39%
Total valid votes		6,067	100.00%	
Rejected, spoiled and declined		12		
Eligible voters / Turnout		8,479	71.69%	-0.57%
Social Credit hold		Swing		-9.00%
Source(s) Alberta Heritage Foundation. "Election results for Camrose". Archived from the original on December 8, 2010.

=== 1960s ===
1963 Alberta general election
Party	Candidate	Votes	%	±%
Social Credit	Chester Sayers	3,427	56.66%	+3.44%
Progressive Conservative	Ernest Moore	1,519	25.12%	-1.88%
Liberal	James P. Richardson	746	12.33%	+0.27%
New Democratic	Kenneth Nelson	356	5.89%	-1.83%
Total valid votes		6,048	100.00%	
Rejected, spoiled and declined		10		
Eligible voters / Turnout		9,259	65.43%	-6.27%
Social Credit hold		Swing		+2.66%
Source(s) Alberta Heritage Foundation. "Election results for Camrose". Archived from the original on December 8, 2010.

1967 Alberta general election
Party	Candidate	Votes	%	±%
Social Credit	Chester Sayers	3,083	44.49%	-12.18%
Progressive Conservative	Emmett G. Mohler	1,736	25.05%	-0.07%
New Democratic	Rudy P. Swanson	1,412	20.38%	+14.49%
Liberal	G. Rod Knaut	699	10.09%	-2.25%
Total valid votes		6,930	100.00%	
Rejected, spoiled and declined		38		
Eligible voters / Turnout		9,537	73.06%	+7.63%
Social Credit hold		Swing		-6.06%
Source(s) Alberta Heritage Foundation. "Election results for Camrose". Archived from the original on December 8, 2010.

=== 1970s ===
1971 Alberta general election
Party	Candidate	Votes	%	±%
Progressive Conservative	Gordon Stromberg	4,552	47.89%	+22.84%
Social Credit	Laurence Rhierson	3,965	41.71%	-2.77%
New Democratic	Keith Boulter	988	10.39%	-9.98%
Total valid votes		9,505	100.00%	
Rejected, spoiled and declined		44		
Eligible voters / Turnout		12,631	75.60%	+2.54%
Progressive Conservative gain from Social Credit		Swing		+12.81%
Source(s) Alberta Heritage Foundation. "Election results for Camrose". Archived from the original on December 8, 2010.

1975 Alberta general election
Party	Candidate	Votes	%	±%
Progressive Conservative	Gordon Stromberg	6,483	72.54%	+24.65%
Social Credit	Ray Reid	1,313	14.69%	-27.02%
New Democratic	David Moore	1,141	12.77%	+2.37%
Total valid votes		8,937	100.00%	
Rejected, spoiled and declined		17		
Eligible voters / Turnout		12,782	70.05%	-5.55%
Progressive Conservative hold		Swing		+25.84%
Source(s) Alberta Heritage Foundation. "Election results for Camrose". Archived from the original on December 8, 2010.

1979 Alberta general election
Party	Candidate	Votes	%	±%
Progressive Conservative	Gordon Stromberg	7,998	60.20%	-12.34%
Social Credit	Ralph A. Sorenson	3,121	23.49%	+8.80%
New Democratic	Arthur C. Bunney	1,888	14.21%	+1.44%
Liberal	John R. Shores	278	2.09%	
Total valid votes		13,285	100.00%	
Rejected, spoiled and declined		31		
Eligible voters / Turnout		19,905	66.90%	-3.15%
Progressive Conservative hold		Swing		-10.57%
Source(s) Alberta Heritage Foundation. "Election results for Camrose". Archived from the original on December 8, 2010.

=== 1980s ===
1982 Alberta general election
Party	Candidate	Votes	%	±%
Progressive Conservative	Gordon Stromberg	10,547	63.86%	+3.65%
New Democratic	Garry Oberg	3,070	18.59%	+4.38%
Western Canada Concept	Keith Schmidt	2,900	17.56%	
Total valid votes		16,517	100.00%	
Rejected, spoiled and declined		84		
Eligible voters / Turnout		22,166	74.89%	+8.00%
Progressive Conservative hold		Swing		-0.36%
Source(s) Alberta Heritage Foundation. "Election results for Camrose". Archived from the original on December 8, 2010.

1986 Alberta general election
Party	Candidate	Votes	%	±%
Progressive Conservative	Ken Rostad	5,312	54.93%	-8.92%
New Democratic	Gordon Ekelund	2,269	23.46%	+4.88%
Liberal	Ralph Tate	758	7.84%	
Representative	J.A. (Jim) Watson	697	7.21%	
Western Canada Concept	Jack Ramsay	634	6.56%	-11.00%
Total valid votes		9,670	100.00%	
Rejected, spoiled and declined		4		
Eligible voters / Turnout		17,886	54.09%	-20.81%
Progressive Conservative hold		Swing		-6.90%
Source(s) Alberta Heritage Foundation. "Election results for Camrose". Archived from the original on December 8, 2010.

1989 Alberta general election
Party	Candidate	Votes	%	±%
Progressive Conservative	Ken Rostad	6,494	63.42%	+8.49%
New Democratic	Bill Scotten	2,141	20.91%	-2.56%
Liberal	Carol Ayers	1,605	15.67%	+7.84%
Total valid votes		10,240	100.00%	
Rejected, spoiled and declined		42		
Eligible voters / Turnout		17,632	58.31%	+4.23%
Progressive Conservative hold		Swing		+5.52%
Source(s) Alberta Heritage Foundation. "Election results for Camrose". Archived from the original on December 8, 2010.

=== 2010s ===
Redistributed results, 2015 Alberta general election
Party	Votes	%
Progressive Conservative	6,888	34.78
New Democratic	6,688	33.77
Wildrose	5,901	29.80
Others	326	1.65

2019 Alberta general election
Party	Candidate	Votes	%	±%
United Conservative	Jackie Lovely	15,587	65.28%	–
New Democratic	Morgan Bamford	4,387	18.37%	–
Alberta Party	Kevin Smook	3,059	12.81%	–
Freedom Conservative	Wes Caldwell	387	1.62%	–
Alberta Advantage	Sandra Kim	173	0.72%	–
Alberta Independence	Don Dubitz	158	0.66%	–
Independent	Bonnie Tanton	126	0.53%	–
Total		23,877	–	–
Rejected, spoiled and declined		122	73	11
Eligible electors / turnout		32,195	74.58%	–
United Conservative pickup new district.				
Source(s) Source: "53 - Camrose, 2019 Alberta general election". officialresults.elections.ab.ca. Elections Alberta.

=== 2020s ===
2023 Alberta general election
Party	Candidate	Votes	%	±%
United Conservative	Jackie Lovely	13,032	63.40	-1.88
New Democratic	Richard Bruneau	5,579	27.14	+8.77
Independent	Bob Blayone	1,740	8.46	–
Wildrose Loyalty Coalition	Pamela Henson	205	1.00	–
Total		20,556	99.54	–
Rejected and declined		96	0.46	
Turnout		20,652	61.58	
Eligible voters		33,537		
United Conservative hold		Swing		-5.33
Source(s) Source: Elections Alberta

== Plebiscite results ==
=== 1957 liquor plebiscite ===
1957 Alberta liquor plebiscite results: Camrose
Question A: Do you approve additional types of outlets for the sale of beer, wine and spirituous liquor subject to a local vote?
Ballot choice	Votes	%
No	2,818	67.16%
Yes	1,378	32.84%
Total votes	4,196	100%
Rejected, spoiled and declined	12	
7,721 eligible electors, turnout 54.50%

On October 30, 1957, a stand-alone plebiscite was held province wide in all 50 of the then current provincial electoral districts in Alberta. The government decided to consult Alberta voters to decide on liquor sales and mixed drinking after a divisive debate in the Legislature. The plebiscite was intended to deal with the growing demand for reforming antiquated liquor control laws.

The plebiscite was conducted in two parts. Question A, asked in all districts, asked the voters if the sale of liquor should be expanded in Alberta, while Question B, asked in a handful of districts within the corporate limits of Calgary and Edmonton, asked if men and women were allowed to drink together in establishments.

Province wide Question A of the plebiscite passed in 33 of the 50 districts while Question B passed in all five districts. Camrose voted heavily against it. The district recorded the second best turnout in the province. It was well above the province wide average of 46%.

Official district returns were released to the public on December 31, 1957. The Social Credit government in power at the time did not consider the results binding. However the results of the vote led the government to repeal all existing liquor legislation and introduce an entirely new Liquor Act.

Municipal districts lying inside electoral districts that voted against the plebiscite such as Camrose were designated Local Option Zones by the Alberta Liquor Control Board and considered effective dry zones, business owners who wanted a license had to petition for a binding municipal plebiscite in order to be granted a license.

== See also ==
- List of Alberta provincial electoral districts
- Canadian provincial electoral districts
