= Viking Cup =

International ice hockey tournament in Camrose, Alberta, Canada

- Viking Cup logo
- Status: Active
- Genre: Ice hockey tournament
- Venue: Encana Arena
- Locations: Camrose, Alberta, Canada
- Inaugurated: 1981
- Most recent: 2026
- Major events: International ice hockey competition
- Organizer: Augustana Vikings Hockey Alumni Association

The Viking Cup is an international ice hockey tournament based in Camrose, Alberta, Canada. The original tournament was hosted by Camrose Lutheran College, later Augustana University College and now the University of Alberta Augustana Campus, and operated from 1981 to 2006. The tournament brought university, college, junior and under-18 national teams from Europe and North America to Camrose. After a hiatus of nearly 20 years, the Viking Cup returned to Camrose for a revived tournament held from December 2025 to January 2026.

== History ==
The Viking Cup was founded by LeRoy Johnson, who was athletic director at Camrose Lutheran College. Johnson had started the college's Vikings hockey program in 1967 and later developed the idea for an international tournament after travelling to Europe with the team in the late 1970s. The tournament debuted in 1981 with teams including TPS of Finland, AIK of Sweden, the Prince Albert Raiders, Red Deer College, Centennial College and the host Camrose Lutheran College Vikings.

The tournament was initially held in consecutive years before becoming a biennial event. It featured teams from countries including Sweden, Finland, the United States, Slovakia, the Czech Republic and Russia, as well as Canadian and American junior, college and university teams. According to Hockey Canada, the Viking Cup was one of the first events to bring junior-aged players from the Soviet Union to Canada and gave NHL scouts an opportunity to see international players compete in person.

The tournament combined hockey competition with cultural exchange. Visiting players were billeted with families in Camrose and the surrounding area, and the event became part of the city's reputation as a hockey community. Canada's College Hockey History described the event as having included players who later appeared at the World Junior Ice Hockey Championships, IIHF World Championship and Winter Olympic Games.

Hockey Canada credited Camrose's previous experience with the Viking Cup as one reason the city later hosted the World Junior A Challenge. The Camrose Sport Development Society, which was formed by a group connected to Viking Cup founder LeRoy Johnson, also helped establish the Camrose Kodiaks of the Alberta Junior Hockey League in 1997.

The original tournament ended after the 2006 event.

== Revival ==
In 2025, organizers announced the return of the Viking Cup after a hiatus of nearly 20 years. The revived event was organized by the Augustana Vikings Hockey Alumni Association and scheduled for December 27, 2025, to January 4, 2026, at Encana Arena in Camrose. Teams listed for the revived tournament included the Czechia University Selects, SAIT Trojans, Saskatchewan Junior Hockey League under-20 all-stars, Augustana Vikings and Midland University Warriors.

The Saskatchewan Junior Hockey League all-stars won the revived tournament, defeating the SAIT Trojans 5–4 in overtime in the gold-medal game on January 3, 2026.

== Legacy ==
A number of future professional and international players competed in the Viking Cup. Hockey Canada listed Dominik Hašek, Sergei Zubov, Bobby Holík, Žigmund Pálffy, Pavol Demitra, Tomáš Vokoun, Olli Jokinen and Henrik Zetterberg among the tournament's alumni. Organizers of the revived tournament stated that more than 400 Viking Cup alumni were later selected in NHL entry drafts.

Johnson later wrote The Viking Cup: International Hockey: A Small College Town Scores Big Time, a book about the tournament's history.

== Results ==
The following table lists tournament champions and most valuable players for the original Viking Cup. Canada's College Hockey History published a retrospective list of Viking Cup champions and MVPs from 1981 to 2006.

Year	Champion	Most valuable player
1981	TPS Juniors	Hannu Virta, TPS Juniors
1982	CSSR Junior Selects	Petr Klíma, CSSR
1984	NAIT Ooks	Cleo Rowein, NAIT
1986	NAIT Ooks	Mark Schultz, NAIT
1988	University of Alberta Golden Bears	Brent Severyn, University of Alberta
1990	McGill University Redmen	Jamie Reeve, McGill
1992	University of New Brunswick Red Devils	Sergei Brylin, CIS
1994	Russia National Junior 18 Selects	Sergei Luchinkin, Russia
1996	Finland National Junior 18 Selects	Olli Jokinen, Finland
1998	SJHL Selects	Mark Hartigan, SJHL
2000	United States National Junior 19 Selects	Rick Gorman, United States
2002	Augustana University College Vikings	Jeff Tambellini, BCHL
2004	Finland National Junior 18 Selects	Tuukka Rask, Finland
2006	University of Guelph Gryphons	Patrick Ouelette, Augustana

The NAIT Ooks were the only team to win consecutive Viking Cup championships, winning the tournament in 1984 and 1986.

=== Revived tournament ===
Year	Champion	Runner-up	Third place	Fourth place	Most valuable player
2026	SJHL U20 Selects	SAIT Trojans	Czechia University Selects	Augustana Vikings	David Routa, Czechia University Selects

The SJHL U20 Selects won the revived tournament, defeating the SAIT Trojans 5–4 in overtime in the final.

The tournament's most valuable player award was recorded for each original Viking Cup from 1981 to 2006 by Canada's College Hockey History. David Routa of the Czechia University Selects was named most valuable player of the revived 2026 tournament.

== See also ==
- Camrose Kodiaks
- University of Alberta Augustana Campus
- World Junior A Challenge
- Camrose, Alberta
