= Verlyn =

Verlyn is a given name. Notable people with the given name include:

- Verlyn Flieger (born 1933), American author, editor, and English professor
- Verlyn Klinkenborg (born 1952), American non-fiction author, academic, and newspaper editor
- Verlyn Olson (born 1954), Canadian politician and lawyer
