= Ken Rostad =

Canadian politician (born 1941)

The Honourable Ken Rostad ECA

Member of the Legislative Assembly of Alberta
- In office 1986–1997
- Constituency: Camrose (1986–93); Wetaskiwin-Camrose (1993–97)

Personal details
- Born: September 7, 1941 (age 84) Yorkton, Saskatchewan .
- Party: Progressive Conservative Association of Alberta

Kenneth Leif Rostad ECA (born September 7, 1941) is a former politician from Alberta, Canada. He served in the Legislative Assembly of Alberta from 1986 to 1997. He held several cabinet portfolios in the Alberta provincial government.

== Political career ==
Rostad was first elected to the Alberta Legislature in the 1986 general election. He defeated four other candidates, including Western Canada Concept leader Jack Ramsay, in the electoral district of Camrose. He was appointed Solicitor General by Premier Don Getty and held that post until September 8, 1988. He was then appointed Attorney General.

Rostad ran for re-election in the 1989 general election. He defeated two other candidates by a large margin.

When Ralph Klein became Premier, Rostad was left out of cabinet. In 1993 the Camrose electoral district was abolished due to redistribution, and Rostad ran for re-election in the new Wetaskiwin-Camrose electoral district in the 1993 general election. He won by a comfortable margin over three other candidates.

After the election Premier Klein reappointed Rostad Attorney General, as the sitting minister, Dick Fowler, had been defeated at the polls. He served in that post until September 15, 1994, when he was appointed Minister of Federal and Intergovernmental Affairs. He held that post until his retirement at dissolution of the Alberta Legislature in 1997.

Legislative Assembly of Alberta
Preceded by Gordon Stromberg	MLA Camrose; 1986-1993	Succeeded by District Abolished
Preceded by New District	MLA Wetaskiwin-Camrose; 1993-1997	Succeeded by LeRoy Johnson
