= Bruce Hinkley =

Canadian politician

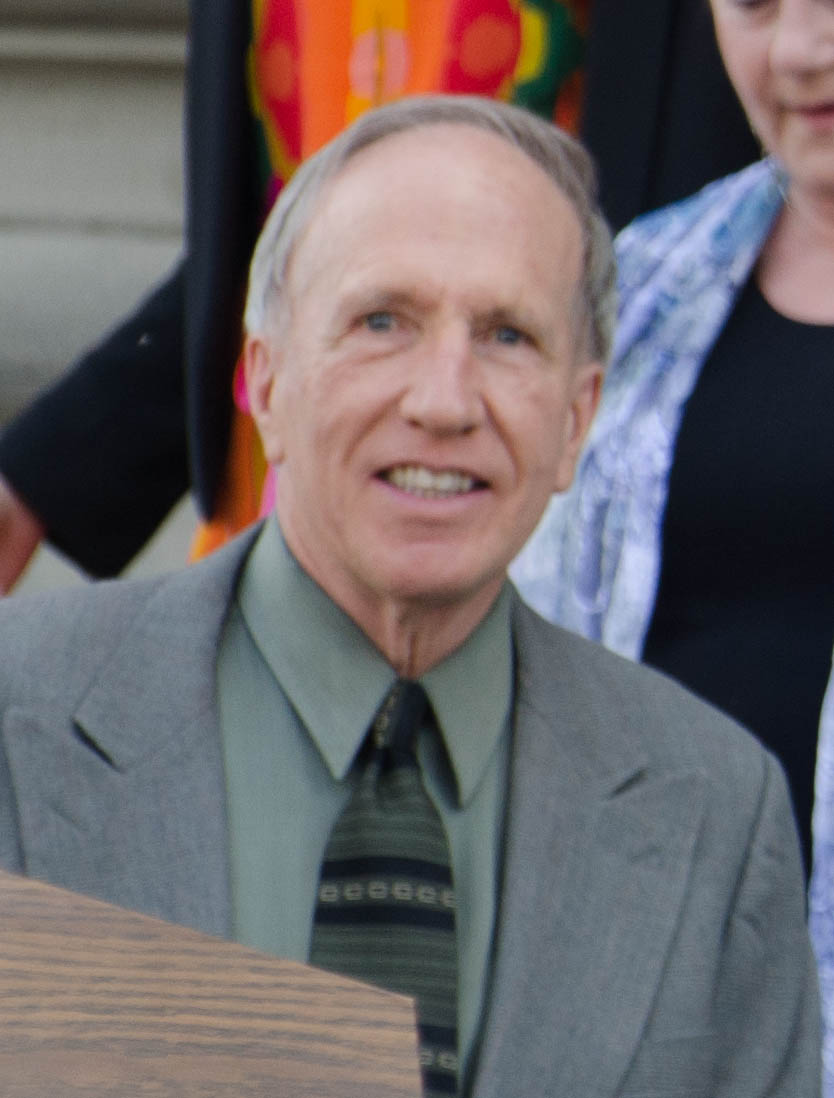
- Hinkley in 2015

Member of the Legislative Assembly of Alberta for Wetaskiwin-Camrose
- In office May 5, 2015 – April 16, 2019
- Preceded by: Verlyn Olson
- Succeeded by: district abolished

Personal details
- Born: 1948 or 1949 (age 76–77)
- Party: Alberta New Democratic Party
- Occupation: Retired educator, principal

Bruce Hinkley (born 1949) is a Canadian politician who was elected in the 2015 Alberta general election to the Legislative Assembly of Alberta representing the electoral district of Wetaskiwin-Camrose.

== Electoral history ==
=== 2012 general election ===
2012 Alberta general election: Wetaskiwin-Camrose
Party	Candidate	Votes	%	±%
Progressive Conservative	Verlyn Olson	7,486	52.25%	-13.63%
Wildrose	Trevor Miller	4,562	31.84%	24.87%
New Democratic	Bruce Hinkley	1,586	11.07%	1.88%
Liberal	Owen Chubb	501	3.50%	-10.54%
Evergreen	Mike Donnelly	191	1.33%	–
Total		14,326	–	–
Rejected, spoiled, and declined		77	–	–
Eligible electors / turnout		28,173	51.12%	8.58%
Progressive Conservative hold		Swing		-15.72%
Source(s) Source: "Wetaskiwin-Camrose Official Results 2012 Alberta general election". Elections Alberta.

=== 2015 general election ===
2015 Alberta general election: Wetaskiwin-Camrose
Party	Candidate	Votes	%	±%
New Democratic	Bruce Hinkley	7,531	43.87%	32.80%
Progressive Conservative	Verlyn Olson	5,951	34.67%	-17.59%
Wildrose	Bill Rock	3,685	21.47%	-10.38%
Total		17,167	–	–
Rejected, spoiled and declined		76	–	–
Eligible electors / turnout		31,527	54.69%	3.57%
New Democratic gain from Progressive Conservative		Swing		-5.60%
Source(s) Source: "Wetaskiwin-Camrose Official Results 2015 Alberta general election". Elections Alberta.
