= George P. Smith (politician) =

Canadian politician (1873–1942)

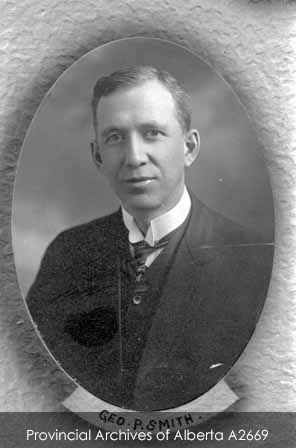

Member of the Legislative Assembly of Alberta for Camrose
- In office March 22, 1909 – July 17, 1921
- Preceded by: established
- Succeeded by: Vernor Smith

Alberta Minister of Education
- In office August 26, 1918 – August 12, 1921
- Premier: Arthur Sifton
- Succeeded by: Perren Baker

Provincial Secretary
- In office October 16, 1917 – August 25, 1918

Personal details
- Born: George Peter Smith; August 12, 1873 Lieury, Ontario
- Died: November 29, 1942 (aged 69)
- Party: Liberal Party of Alberta
- Occupation: insurance

George Peter Smith (August 12, 1873 – November 29, 1942) was a businessman (storekeeper, fur trader and newspaperman) and politician in Alberta, Canada. He served as MLA from 1909 to 1921 and served as provincial cabinet minister from 1918 to 1921. He was born in Lieury, Ontario and came west in 1901 while working for an insurance company.

== Move West ==
After visiting Duhamel (a mission settlement southwest of Camrose, Alberta), Smith bought the local Trading Store in 1902. A well-respected Cree man named Pe-o-kis introduced Smith to other influential settlers including Francois Adam and Camille Miquelon. Smith had good relationships with the Métis of the Laboucane Settlement and the Saulteaux peoples, and developed a lucrative fur-trading business. According to reports, he brought the most furs to be traded in Edmonton, 123,000 pelts. When a new CPR line was being built from Wetaskiwin to the village of Sparling (later Camrose), Smith anticipated the growth of the village and opened a store in Sparling.

He is credited with suggesting the town's new name, Camrose, in 1905. In late 1908, Smith launched the Camrose Canadian newspaper, which exists to this day. As a founding father and booster of Camrose, Smith did much to promote the town and the surrounding region. He was responsible for the opening of Alberta's second Normal School in Camrose in 1915.

He died in 1942.

== Political career ==
Smith ran for a seat in the Alberta Legislature in the 1909 Alberta general election. He won the new Camrose district with a comfortable majority. He promoted immigration while in office.

Smith was re-elected in a landslide to a second term in office during the 1913 Alberta general election. He significantly increased his majority from last time.

He was re-elected to a third term in the Alberta Legislature in the 1917 Alberta general election, this time with a smaller majority of votes.

On August 26, 1918, he was appointed Minister of Education in the government. Smith held the post until he was defeated in the 1921 Alberta general election by Vernor W. Smith from the United Farmers of Alberta. The two Smiths were not related.

=== Prosecution ===
The United Farmers government prosecuted Smith in 1926. The issue arose from a question Robert Marshall had asked in the legislature in regards to $5,820.00 that had been plundered from the Alberta Treasury in September 1921 by Smith. The government claimed it had no political motive in prosecuting Smith. The United Farmers government had Smith charged with fraud, saying the money was taken from the treasury to pay Esdale Press Ltd. for services rendered.

=== Federal candidacy ===
Smith ran for the Camrose seat in the House of Commons of Canada in the 1935 Canadian federal election, losing to Social Credit candidate James Alexander Marshall.

Legislative Assembly of Alberta
Preceded by New District	MLA Camrose; 1909–1921	Succeeded by Vernor W. Smith
