= Chester Ronning =

Canadian educator, politician, and diplomat

Chester Ronning CC AOE
- Born: Chester Alvin Ronning; December 13, 1894; Fancheng, China
- Died: December 31, 1984 (aged 90); Camrose, Alberta, Canada
- Education: University of Alberta
- Occupations: Teacher; college principal; politician; diplomat

Chester Alvin Ronning CC AOE (December 13, 1894 – December 31, 1984) was a Canadian educator, politician, and diplomat.

Ronning was born in Fancheng, China, now in Xiangyang, Hubei province, the son of Norwegian American Lutheran missionaries, and graduated from the University of Alberta in 1916 with a B.Sc. Ronning's family moved from China to the Peace River country of Alberta. Halvor Ronning, Chester's father, was instrumental in establishing a Norwegian settlement north-west of Grande Prairie called Valhalla Centre. When Chester Ronning started his studies at the University of Alberta, he travelled by horse from Valhalla Centre to Edmonton along the Edson Trail. This was the only "road" connecting the Peace country to the provincial capital. In later years the Northern Alberta Railway (now part of Canadian National Railway) was constructed.

He returned to China to serve as a missionary from 1922 to 1927 and then returned to Alberta where he took up a position as Principal of the Camrose Lutheran College, a position he held for 15 years. In 1942 he submitted a master's thesis to the University of Alberta's College of Education entitled "A study of an Alberta Protestant private school: the Camrose Lutheran College, a residential high school."

He was a member of the United Farmers of Alberta and on October 25, 1932, he was elected in a by-election for Camrose. From his entry into the legislature, he was an outspoken adherent of the newly formed Co-operative Commonwealth Federation party. He was defeated in the 1935 provincial election that wiped out the UFA government. He was leader of the Alberta CCF from 1940 to 1942. The 1940 Alberta election saw no CCFers elected despite winning 11 per cent of the vote. Ronning stepped aside as leader in favour of Elmer Roper, who won a 1942 by-election to become Alberta's first elected CCF MLA. Ronning ran unsuccessfully for the CCF in the 1945 federal election in the riding of Camrose, losing to the Social Credit candidate, James Alexander Marshall.

Ronning served in diplomatic posts in China (1945–1951), Norway (1954–1957), India (1957–1964) and the United Nations. He also participated in the international commissions on Korea (1954) and Laos (1961–62) and undertook special missions to Hanoi (1965–66) in attempts to mediate the Vietnam War. In 1967 he was made an Officer of the Order of Canada and was promoted to Companion in 1972. He was inducted into the Alberta Order of Excellence in 1983.

The legacy of Ronning continues with the Chester Ronning Centre for the Study of Religion and Public Life at the University of Alberta Augustana Campus in Camrose, Alberta. The Centre exists to facilitate interdisciplinary research, critical teaching, ethical reflection, and public programming on a range of issues in which religious communities, practices and ideas are directly implicated, or on which thoughtful religious perspectives might be brought to bear. Chester Ronning School in Camrose, Alberta, is also named after him.
