= University of Alberta Augustana campus =

Faculty of the University of Alberta

Augustana Campus
- Type: Faculty
- Established: 1910
- Parent institution: University of Alberta
- Dean: John Parkins
- Academic staff: 55
- Students: 1000
- Location: Camrose, Alberta, Canada; 53.0116°N 112.8242°W
- Website: www.ualberta.ca/augustana

The Augustana Campus is a faculty of the University of Alberta located in Camrose, Alberta, Canada. It was merged into the larger, Edmonton-based university in 2004.

== History ==
Augustana has a long history in Alberta, beginning in 1910 as "Camrose Lutheran College". It was merged into the University of Alberta as of July 1, 2004.

== Campus life ==
Approximately 1050 students of the University of Alberta study full-time at the Augustana Campus. About half of the students live on campus. The Faculty draws from the surrounding area, (especially rural areas throughout Alberta) from the rest of Canada and elsewhere to make up its student population and staff. About 15% of the student body are International students from a variety of countries around the world.

The campus has residency options, including a specific building for freshman students. It is located near the middle of campus to new students still learning the layout of the campus and to facilitate building community with their peers. Freshman students are generally expected to live their first year in residence, with the option of continuing in residency or finding their own off-campus accommodations after that. Residency ensures a student not only a room but also three meals a day at the dining hall. Typically students in and beyond their second year may choose to reside close to the main area in a set of buildings commonly referred to as "The Ravine", which sports a central common-area building with cooking and laundry facility known as "The Dish".

The Faculty has three departments: Fine Arts & Humanities, Science, and Social Science. Augustana offers a number of certificates that can be pursued in addition to one's degree, including a Certificate in Community Engagement and Service-Learning, a Certificate in Sustainability, a Certificate in Writing Studies and a psychology Certificate in Community Mental Health. Augustana students benefit from small class size, proximity to the teaching staff, and "a close knit lively campus community". They also benefit from the fact that Augustana offers only undergraduate courses, which means that they have the opportunity to work as Research Assistants for professors over the summer while still in their undergraduate years. Augustana also offers a unique semester system that includes a three-week block and enhances opportunities for students to participate in study abroad, community service learning, research projects, and experiential learning opportunities. In the Fall of 2020, Augustana introduced three new interdisciplinary major programs as well as a project-based core in order to allow students to customize their degree to their own interests while also teaching them the skills needed to excel in any future career path or industry. The interdisciplinary programs are Creativity and Culture (Visual arts, Dramatic arts, English, Modern languages, and Music), Ethics and Global Studies (History, Philosophy, Political Studies, and Religious Studies), and Law, Crime, and Justice Studies (History, Political Studies, Psychology, and Sociology).

Augustana competes predominantly in the Alberta Colleges Athletic Conference and Canadian Colleges Athletic Association as the Augustana Vikings. Team sports include: cross country running, basketball, volleyball, curling, women's soccer, and hockey. The Viking Cup was an annual hockey tournament, hosted by Augustana, which featured teams from North America and Europe; it has since been discontinued.

Augustana holds preview days four times a year, where prospective students are shown a tour of the campus by current students, have a chance to sit in for a class, get help with applying for university, meet professors, and learn about activities the campus provides. Private tours of the campus are also available.

The Augustana Campus Library supports the research needs of approximately 1050 undergraduate liberal arts and sciences students and 75 teaching faculty. It is a wireless hotspot, provides access to over 100 full productivity computer workstations, a variety of student work spaces and group rooms, and the Writing Centre.
