= LeRoy Johnson (politician) =

Canadian politician and teacher

MLA for Wetaskiwin-Camrose
- In office March 11, 1997 – March 3, 2008
- Preceded by: Ken Rostad
- Succeeded by: Verlyn Olson

Personal details
- Born: March 5, 1941 (age 85) Camrose, Alberta
- Party: Progressive Conservative

LeRoy Johnson (born March 5, 1941) is a teacher and politician from Alberta, Canada. He is the former MLA for Wetaskiwin-Camrose.

== Early life ==
Johnson was born in 1941 in Camrose. Johnson holds a number of degrees from the University of Alberta, University of Calgary and the University of Montana.

He has served as an educator in various positions and schools at different levels for more than 30 years.

== Political career ==
Johnson started his political career as an Alderman for the city of Camrose, Alberta. He served that position for six years, including six years on the Camrose Public School Board, for four of those years he was chairman.

Johnson was elected to his first term as a Member of the Legislative Assembly of Alberta in the 1997 Alberta general election. He was re-elected twice before deciding not run in the 2008 election.
