= Verlyn Olson =

Canadian politician & lawyer (born 1954)

The Honourable Verlyn Olson ECA
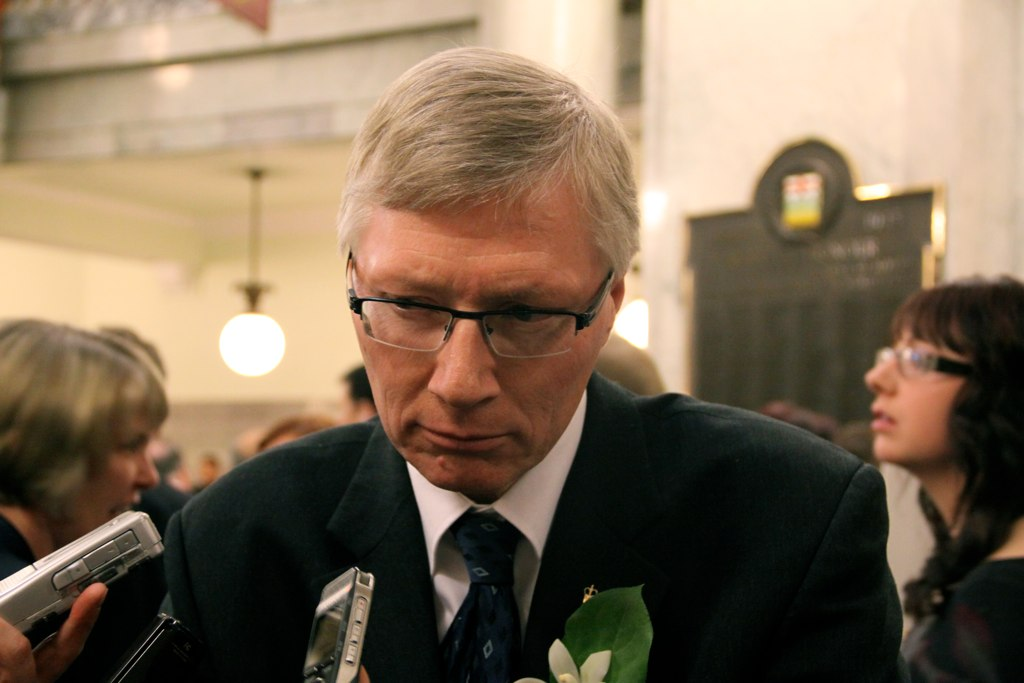

MLA for Wetaskiwin-Camrose
- In office March 3, 2008 – May 5, 2015
- Preceded by: LeRoy Johnson
- Succeeded by: Bruce Hinkley

Personal details
- Born: Verlyn Dale Olson; February 4, 1954 (age 72) Camrose, Alberta, Canada
- Party: Progressive Conservative
- Spouse: Mardell
- Children: 3

Verlyn Dale Olson ECA (born February 4, 1954) is a Canadian politician and lawyer. He served as a member of the Alberta Legislature from 2008 to 2015 and was a cabinet minister from 2011 until 2015.

== Political career ==
Olson first ran for a seat to the House of Commons of Canada in the Crowfoot electoral district in the 2000 Canadian federal election under the federal Progressive Conservative banner. He was defeated by Kevin Sorenson in a landslide that also saw incumbent Jack Ramsay get defeated.

Olson ran for seat to the Alberta Legislature in the 2008 provincial election and was elected to represent the electoral district of Wetaskiwin-Camrose in the Legislative Assembly of Alberta. He is a member of the provincial Progressive Conservatives.

Olson succeeded Alison Redford as Alberta's Minister of Justice and Attorney General on February 18, 2011. He was appointed Minister of Agriculture for Alberta on May 8, 2012.

He was appointed acting Minister of Justice and Attorney General on April 25, 2015, in the middle of the election campaign, upon the sudden resignation of Jonathan Denis. He was defeated in the 2015 Alberta general election by NDP candidate Bruce Hinkley.
