= David B. Mullen =

Canadian politician (1885–1940)

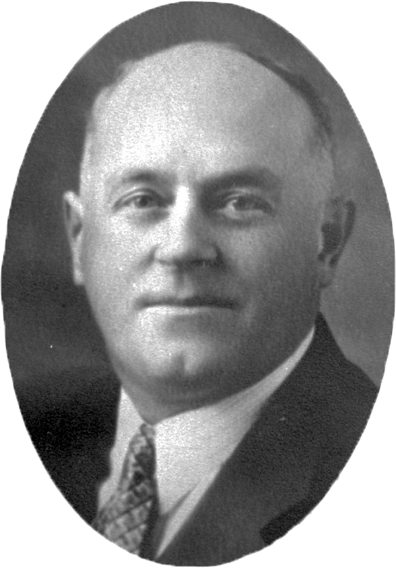

Member of the Legislative Assembly of Alberta
- In office 1935–1940
- Constituency: Edmonton

Personal details
- Born: November 4, 1885 Peterborough, Ontario, Canada
- Died: October 28, 1940 (aged 54) Edmonton, Alberta, Canada
- Party: Social Credit

David Bertram Mullen (November 4, 1885 – October 28, 1940) was a provincial politician from Alberta, Canada. He served as a Social Credit member of the Legislative Assembly of Alberta from 1935 to 1940, sitting as a government member. He served as the Minister of Agriculture from 1937 until his death in 1940 from a heart attack.
