= Camrose, Alberta =

City in Alberta, Canada

Camrose
- City
- City of Camrose
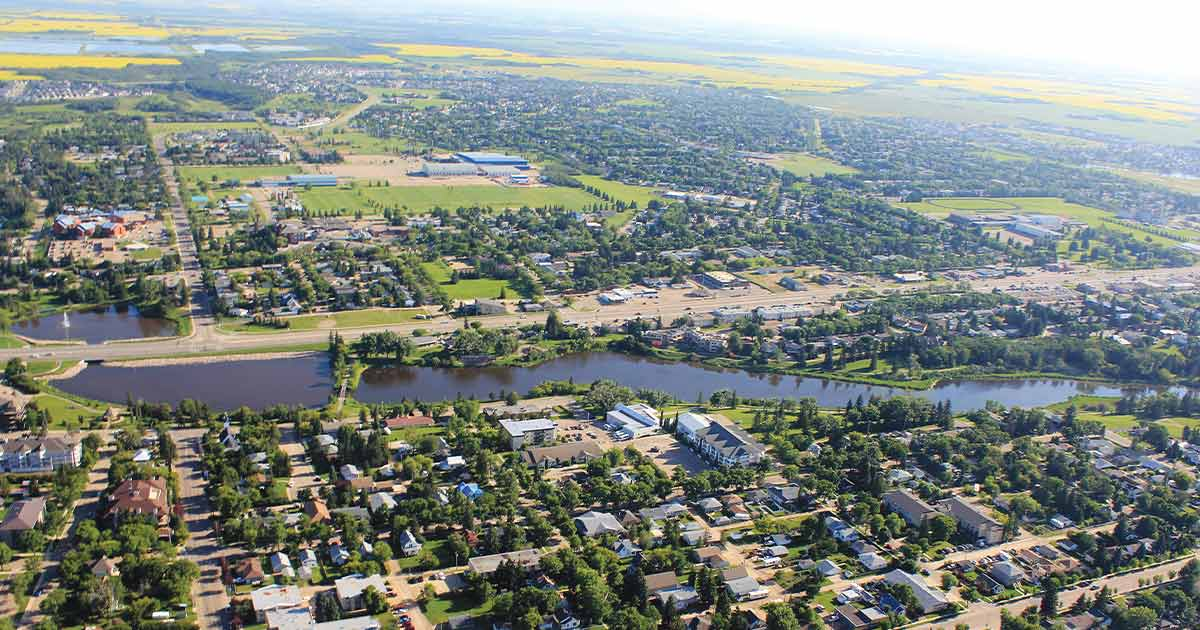
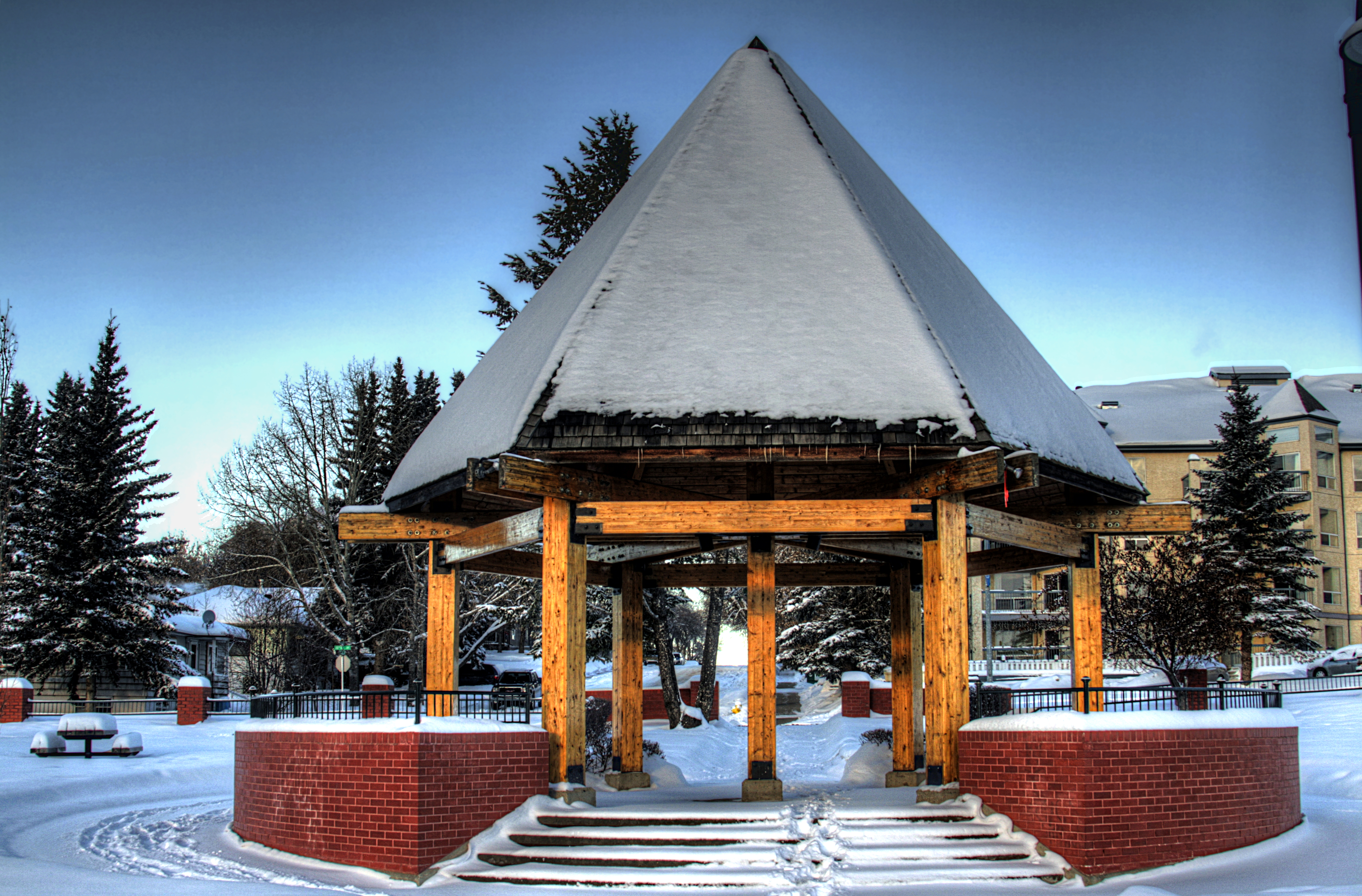
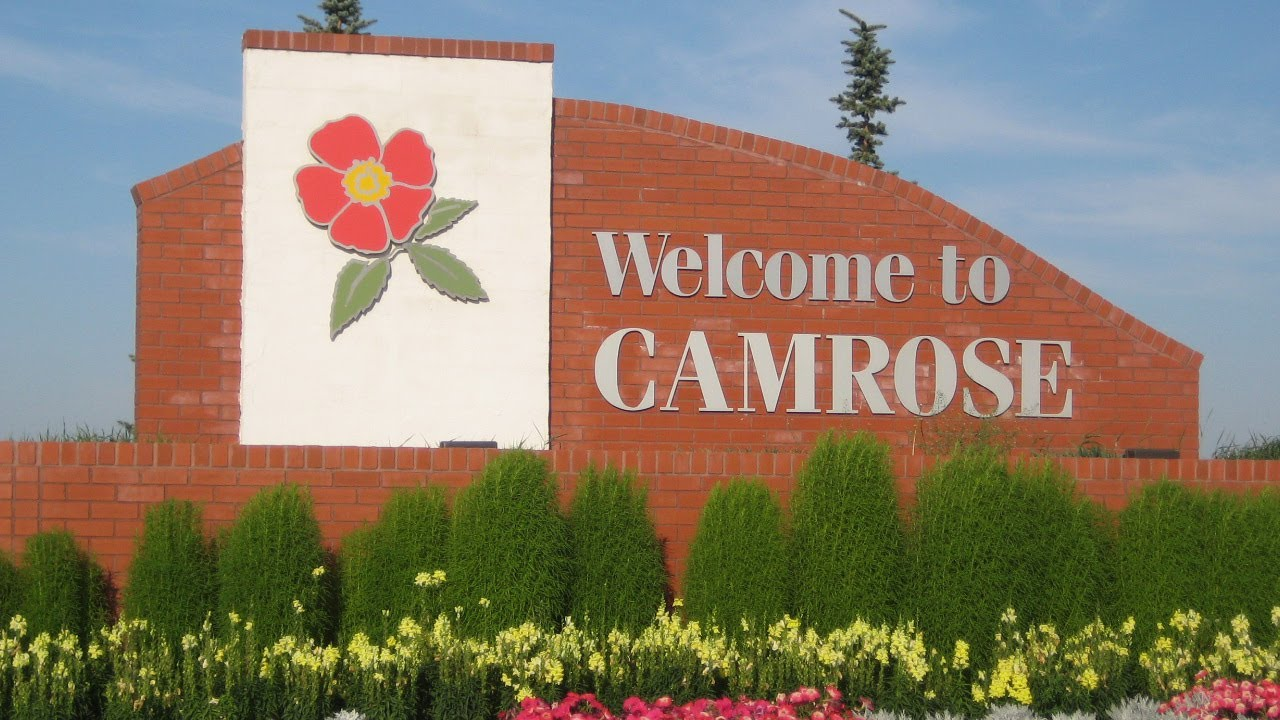
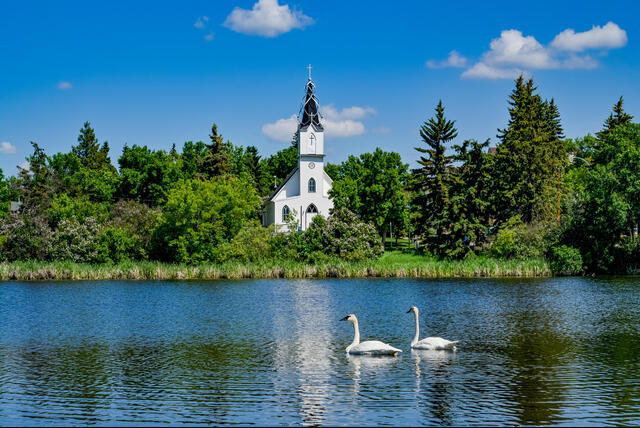

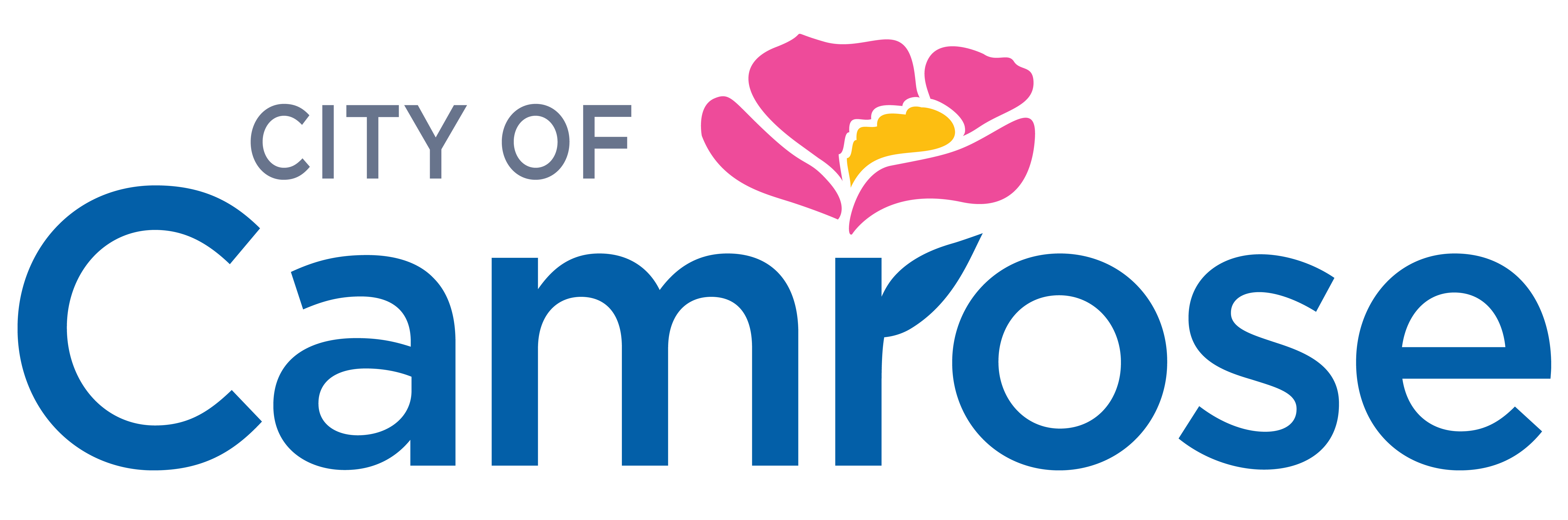
- Flag Logo
- Nicknames: The Rose City; Slogan: The stage is set
- City boundaries

- Location in Alberta Location in Canada Location in Camrose County
- Coordinates: 53°1′29″N 112°49′27″W
- Country: Canada
- Province: Alberta
- Planning region: North Saskatchewan
- Municipal district: Camrose County
- Incorporated
  - Village: May 4, 1905
  - Town: December 11, 1906
  - City: January 1, 1955

Government
  - Mayor: PJ Stasko
  - Governing body: Camrose City Council: Lucas Banack; Lana Broker; David Francoeur; Agnes Hoveland; DJ Ilg; Joy-Anne Murphy; Don Rosland; Wayne Throndson
  - City Manager: Malcolm Boyd
  - MP: Pierre Poilievre (Conservative – Battle River—Crowfoot)
  - MLA: Jackie Lovely (UCP – Camrose)

Area (2021)
  - Land: 41.67 km^{2} (16.09 sq mi)
- Elevation: 740 m (2,430 ft)

Population (2021)
  - Total: 18,772
  - Density: 450.5/km^{2} (1,167/sq mi)
  - Municipal census (2025): 19,984
- Time zone: UTC−06:00 (Alberta Time)
- Forward sortation area: T4V
- Area codes: 780, 587, 825, 368
- NTS Map: 83H2 Camrose
- GNBC Code: IAKKF
- Highways: 13, 26, 833
- Website: camrose.ca

Camrose (/ˈkæmroʊz/ KAM-rohz) is a city in central Alberta, Canada that is surrounded by Camrose County. Located along Highway 13, it had its beginnings as a railroad hub. Camrose is located approximately 90 km (56 mi) from the city of Edmonton, and, approximately 290 km (180 mi) from the city of Calgary.

== History ==
The area around Camrose was first settled by Europeans around 1900. At that time the nearby settlement of Wetaskiwin was a major centre for pioneers; typically, it was the last stopping-off point before they set out in search of nearby land. The site that was to be Camrose was about a day's journey from Wetaskiwin along the railroad, which made it a popular place on the route of pioneers. Soon businessmen and other settlers arrived to stay. The settlers came primarily from Scandinavian countries, such as Norway and Sweden, and many settlers also came from the United States. At that time the settlement was known as the hamlet of Stoney Creek. In 1904, Stoney Creek began receiving mail service, its first businesses began to open, and its first Royal Canadian Mounted Police (RCMP) officer (Constable "Blue" Smith) arrived.

On May 4, 1905, the community was incorporated as the Village of Camrose. There is no factual evidence about the reason for the choice of the name Camrose, but it is generally thought that it was named after the Village of Camrose in Pembrokeshire, South Wales. On December 11, 1906, Camrose was incorporated as a town.

In 1906, Camrose opened its first newspaper, The Camrose Mail, which was replaced in 1908 by the Camrose Canadian, which was published until 2018. In March 1907 the town erected a building for town administration, which also held its first police and fire station. In May 1907, it spent $10,000 on its schoolhouse. In October 1907 men from Alberta Government Telephones set up Camrose's first telephone exchange, and by 1908 about fifty residents had telephone access. 1911 saw the construction of Camrose's first power plant.

From 1905 to 1914, there was a great deal of railway construction in the Camrose area. Camrose became a bit of a railroad hub, sitting on railways that connected to Edmonton and Calgary, as well as many of the smaller towns in central Alberta, such as Vegreville, Stettler, Drumheller, and Wetaskiwin. By 1914, twelve passenger trains came through Camrose daily. In those days the growth of Camrose was strongly linked with the railway.

On June 26, 1912, the first building of the Camrose Lutheran College (known as Augustana University College from 1991 to 2004) was opened. Today the campus continues as the Augustana Faculty of the University of Alberta.

During World War II, the Camrose Fairgrounds were converted to an army training grounds. About ten H-Shaped huts were built, as were mess quarters, a medical building and a storehouse. Thousands of Canadian boys came to Camrose to receive their basic training. The city's name was also used for HMCS Camrose (K154), a Flower-class corvette that served with the Royal Canadian Navy during the Second World War.

Camrose became a city on January 1, 1955. By 1958, Camrose had converted the old post office into the new city hall. In 1954, however, Camrose had sold the old town hall to the federal government, so in the interim the city council met for almost three years in the hall of the local Methodist Church.

Camrose has continued to expand, even as the significance of the railroads waned. It is now stretching out along Highway 13, and is becoming a major stop for travellers along that road. With the advent of the Big Valley Jamboree in Camrose it has become even more oriented towards tourism and hospitality.

On October 26, 2005, a single lottery ticket worth $54,000,000 (the second largest in Canadian history) was sold in Camrose. The ticket belonged to 17 oil industry workers.

In August 2006, Camrose held a Founders Day when four men were inducted as founding fathers of Camrose.

Since the mid-2000s, Camrose has continued to develop as a regional service centre for east-central Alberta. The city's population grew from 18,742 in the 2016 Census to 18,772 in the 2021 Census, according to Statistics Canada. The 2025 municipal census recorded a population of 19,984, while Alberta's regional dashboard estimated Camrose's 2025 population at 20,801.

Recreation infrastructure expanded in 2007 with the opening of new arena facilities at the Camrose Recreation Centre. The spectator events arena, known as Encana Arena, was built in 2007 and has seating for more than 2,500 spectators, while a second regulation ice surface, the Border Paving Arena, was also built that year. The facility has been used by teams including the Camrose Kodiaks and the Augustana Vikings. The same year, the Camrose Casino and Resort opened in June 2007.

On August 1, 2009, severe weather caused the main stage at the Big Valley Jamboree to collapse, killing one person and injuring others. A fatality inquiry later found that the collapse occurred during high winds and recommended improved standards for temporary stages in Alberta. The festival later continued and remained one of Camrose's major annual tourism events.

The city's arts sector expanded in 2014 with the opening of the Jeanne and Peter Lougheed Performing Arts Centre on the University of Alberta Augustana Campus. The facility was officially named at its opening in November 2014 and added a major modern performance venue to the city.

During the 2010s and 2020s, Camrose continued to market itself as a regional hub for work, services, recreation and entertainment. The City of Camrose described the community as having a trading area of about 150,000 people, supported by rail transport, air and highway transportation corridors.

== Geography ==
Camrose is situated about 90 km (56 mi) from Edmonton, the capital of Alberta. Highway 13 runs through its centre. Camrose is located in a transitory region of Alberta, between prairie and boreal forest, known as aspen parkland. It is a major economic centre for many small farming communities in the surrounding area. The Stoney Creek runs through the city and flows into the Battle River south of the city.

=== Climate ===
Camrose has a humid continental climate (Köppen climate classification Dfb) and falls into the NRC Plant Hardiness Zone 3b. Summers are warm with moderate rainfall while winters can be long and cold.

Climate data for Camrose, Alberta (1991–2020 normals, extremes 1946–present)
Month	Jan	Feb	Mar	Apr	May	Jun	Jul	Aug	Sep	Oct	Nov	Dec	Year
Record high humidex	11.0	13.5	24.5	26.3	31.6	37.2	43.4	38.5	33.3	26.6	21.7	13.4	43.4
Record high °C (°F)	11.1 (52.0)	14.2 (57.6)	25.1 (77.2)	31.1 (88.0)	32.5 (90.5)	34.2 (93.6)	36.7 (98.1)	35.3 (95.5)	33.0 (91.4)	28.0 (82.4)	21.7 (71.1)	13.9 (57.0)	36.7 (98.1)
Mean daily maximum °C (°F)	−6.4 (20.5)	−4.0 (24.8)	1.0 (33.8)	10.0 (50.0)	17.2 (63.0)	20.5 (68.9)	23.1 (73.6)	22.5 (72.5)	17.4 (63.3)	9.7 (49.5)	0.1 (32.2)	−5.3 (22.5)	8.8 (47.9)
Daily mean °C (°F)	−12.2 (10.0)	−10.2 (13.6)	−4.8 (23.4)	3.8 (38.8)	10.3 (50.5)	14.3 (57.7)	16.7 (62.1)	15.6 (60.1)	10.5 (50.9)	3.5 (38.3)	−5.0 (23.0)	−10.8 (12.6)	2.6 (36.8)
Mean daily minimum °C (°F)	−17.8 (0.0)	−16.4 (2.5)	−10.6 (12.9)	−2.4 (27.7)	3.4 (38.1)	8.1 (46.6)	10.2 (50.4)	8.7 (47.7)	3.6 (38.5)	−2.7 (27.1)	−10.1 (13.8)	−16.2 (2.8)	−3.5 (25.7)
Record low °C (°F)	−47.2 (−53.0)	−47.8 (−54.0)	−42.8 (−45.0)	−32.2 (−26.0)	−11.7 (10.9)	−2.0 (28.4)	1.0 (33.8)	−1.1 (30.0)	−16.1 (3.0)	−23.0 (−9.4)	−35.8 (−32.4)	−44.0 (−47.2)	−47.8 (−54.0)
Record low wind chill	−53.8	−52.2	−46.6	−29.0	−15.5	−2.8	—	—	−11.9	−25.7	−43.7	−49.7	−53.8
Average precipitation mm (inches)	18.5 (0.73)	9.4 (0.37)	16.2 (0.64)	27.0 (1.06)	39.6 (1.56)	71.6 (2.82)	73.2 (2.88)	44.1 (1.74)	34.2 (1.35)	17.6 (0.69)	16.3 (0.64)	10.2 (0.40)	377.9 (14.88)
Average rainfall mm (inches)	2.8 (0.11)	0.3 (0.01)	1.4 (0.06)	18.4 (0.72)	38.0 (1.50)	74.4 (2.93)	85.8 (3.38)	51.5 (2.03)	39.6 (1.56)	13.2 (0.52)	2.0 (0.08)	0.9 (0.04)	328.3 (12.94)
Average snowfall cm (inches)	21.6 (8.5)	13.4 (5.3)	21.7 (8.5)	10.5 (4.1)	3.2 (1.3)	0.0 (0.0)	0.0 (0.0)	0.0 (0.0)	0.2 (0.1)	10.5 (4.1)	16.8 (6.6)	15.6 (6.1)	113.5 (44.6)
Average precipitation days (≥ 0.2 mm)	8.6	6.9	8.4	7.9	10.0	15.2	14.7	11.6	9.6	7.8	8.1	6.9	115.7
Average rainy days (≥ 0.2 mm)	0.75	0.33	1.2	5.2	10.1	14.2	14.2	11.8	9.5	5.7	1.8	0.7	75.48
Average snowy days (≥ 0.2 cm)	8.3	6.7	6.6	2.7	0.54	0.0	0.0	0.0	0.13	2.4	7.0	7.4	41.77
Average relative humidity (%) (at 15:00 LST)	75.2	70.1	66.5	49.9	43.1	53.6	57.3	53.9	51.9	56.2	73.2	75.2	60.5
Source: Environment Canada (rain/rain days, snow/snow days 1981–2010)

== Demographics ==
Federal census population history
Year	Pop.	±%
1906	412	—
1911	1,586	+285.0%
1916	1,692	+6.7%
1921	1,892	+11.8%
1926	2,002	+5.8%
1931	2,258	+12.8%
1936	2,263	+0.2%
1941	2,598	+14.8%
1946	2,967	+14.2%
1951	4,131	+39.2%
1956	5,817	+40.8%
1961	6,939	+19.3%
1966	8,362	+20.5%
1971	8,673	+3.7%
1976	10,104	+16.5%
1981	12,570	+24.4%
1986	12,968	+3.2%
1991	13,420	+3.5%
1996	13,728	+2.3%
2001	14,854	+8.2%
2006	15,620	+5.2%
2011	17,286	+10.7%
2016	18,742	+8.4%
2021	18,772	+0.2%
Source: Statistics Canada

Camrose's 2025 municipal census counted a population of 19,984.

In the 2021 Census of Population conducted by Statistics Canada, the City of Camrose had a population of 18,772 living in 8,136 of its 8,747 total private dwellings, a change of 0.2% from its 2016 population of 18,742. With a land area of 41.67 km^{2} (16.09 sq mi), it had a population density of 450.5/km^{2} (1,166.8/sq mi) in 2021.

In the 2016 Census of Population conducted by Statistics Canada, the City of Camrose had a population of 18,742 living in 8,055 of its 8,520 total private dwellings, a change of 8.4% from its 2011 population of 17,286. With a land area of 42.62 km^{2} (16.46 sq mi), it had a population density of 439.7/km^{2} (1,138.9/sq mi) in 2016.

The population of the City of Camrose according to its 2016 municipal census is 18,044, a change of 0.03% from its 2014 municipal census population of 18,038.

=== Ethnicity ===
The primary ancestries are Scandinavian (26.3%), German (25.6%), English (20.2%), Scottish (17.6%), Irish (14.4%), and Aboriginal (3.5%).

Panethnic groups in the City of Camrose (2001−2021)
Panethnic group	2021		2016		2011		2006		2001	
Panethnic group	Pop.	%	Pop.	%	Pop.	%	Pop.	%	Pop.	%
European (Note: Statistic includes all persons that did not make up part of a visible minority or an indigenous identity.)	14,835	81.58%	15,760	86.55%	15,535	91.92%	13,985	92.19%	13,785	96.03%
Indigenous	1,395	7.67%	970	5.33%	720	4.26%	530	3.49%	345	2.4%
Southeast Asian (Note: Statistic includes total responses of "Filipino" and "Southeast Asian" under visible minority section on census.)	950	5.22%	720	3.95%	160	0.95%	145	0.96%	20	0.14%
South Asian	345	1.9%	240	1.32%	60	0.36%	80	0.53%	65	0.45%
African	285	1.57%	195	1.07%	110	0.65%	105	0.69%	35	0.24%
East Asian (Note: Statistic includes total responses of "Chinese", "Korean", and "Japanese" under visible minority section on census.)	160	0.88%	115	0.63%	105	0.62%	180	1.19%	45	0.31%
Latin American	95	0.52%	130	0.71%	80	0.47%	90	0.59%	0	0%
Middle Eastern (Note: Statistic includes total responses of "West Asian" and "Arab" under visible minority section on census.)	45	0.25%	50	0.27%	110	0.65%	15	0.1%	50	0.35%
Other/multiracial (Note: Statistic includes total responses of "Visible minority, n.i.e." and "Multiple visible minorities" under visible minority section on census.)	80	0.44%	25	0.14%	15	0.09%	50	0.33%	20	0.14%
Total responses	18,185	96.87%	18,210	97.16%	16,900	97.77%	15,170	97.12%	14,355	96.54%
Total population	18,772	100%	18,742	100%	17,286	100%	15,620	100%	14,870	100%
Note: Totals greater than 100% due to multiple origin responses

=== Language ===
English is the first language of 90% of the population. About 2.1% of residents said German, 1.1% said Ukrainian, 1.0% said French, and 0.7% said Spanish was their first language. The next most common languages were Chinese and Dutch at 0.6% each, followed by Danish and Norwegian at 0.4% each, Swedish at 0.3%, and Lao at 0.2%.

=== Religion ===
The 2001 census found 85% of residents identified as Christian, while 14% had no religious affiliation. For specific denominations Statistics Canada found that 24% of residents identified as Roman Catholic, while 20% identified as Lutheran, and 19% identified with the United Church of Canada. Among the less numerous denominations, 4% identified as Anglican, and about 2% each identified as Baptist and Pentecostal.

== Sports and recreation ==
The Camrose Recreation Centre, a multi-purpose sporting facility, officially opened on September 28, 2007. The complex includes the 2,500 seat Encana Arena (home of the Camrose Kodiaks of the AJHL and the Augustana Vikings of the ACAC), and the 300+ seat Border Paving arena. The facility also boasts a three lane fitness track, fitness centre, physiotherapy clinic, physiotherapy lab, children's play room, meeting rooms, offices, and food and beverage facilities. Attached to this facility is the Max McLean Arena, former home of the Viking Cup, the Vikings and the Kodiaks, as well as the Camrose Aquatic Centre and curling rink.

Camrose hosted the Viking Cup, an international ice hockey tournament associated with Camrose Lutheran College and later Augustana, from 1981 to 2006; the tournament returned to Camrose in 2025 after a nearly 20-year hiatus.

Other recreational facilities include the Camrose Community Centre (walking track and indoor soccer centre), spray park, Camrose Skate Park, Kinsmen Park (which includes tennis courts, three fastball fields, football field, beach volleyball courts, a 2.2 km walking path), and Rudy Swanson Park, home to various soccer facilities and recreational groups.

Camrose has a large urban trail system which winds through Stoney Creek Valley. The total trail length is approximately 10.2 km.

Camrose is also home to a wide variety of sports clubs including figure skating, baseball, softball, football, hockey and swimming to name a few. The Camrose Ski Club, founded in 1911, is the oldest cross-country ski club in Canada, and has produced many elite level athletes including several Olympians.

=== Parks ===
Camrose is known colloquially as the "Rose City" due to the large number of wild roses which grow in the surrounding parklands. Developed to withstand the Alberta climate, the Camrose Rose was introduced to the city in 1995. Local rose grower Jerry Twomey bred and patented this variety of rose to honour his birthplace. The variety may be seen on display at the Bill Fowler Centre.

The foundation of Camrose's modern urban park system began in 1989, when the city received an Urban Park Grant from the Alberta Government's Heritage Fund. Planning took place over the following two years, and construction began in 1991 and continued until 1996, creating much of the park system that exists today.

- Jubilee Park is often used by the community, located in a valley and featuring barbecue shelters, a wandering stream and wide open space.
- Mirror Lake sits in the centre of the city. Once a reservoir for the electrical plants which powered the city, the man-made lake was later home to two species of swan: the trumpeter and the Polish mute. The City of Camrose provided a winter shelter to the clipped birds. These swans called Camrose home for over twenty years. In September 2019, City Council voted to end the swan program due primarily to ethical concerns of keeping wild animals confined for five to six months a year, as well as managing offspring and trading the birds every three years.
- Mirror Lake Park is the focal point of the Camrose urban parks system. Located on the edge of Mirror Lake, it is the home of the Bill Fowler Centre which contains the Chamber of Commerce office and the Tourist Information Centre. The Bill Fowler Centre features a nature mural, carved out of red brick. The mural features many of the animals which are indigenous to the Mirror Lake area.
- Mirror Lake flows from Stoney Creek, which wanders through the city, and provides a river valley for viewing wildlife through paved walking paths.

== Government ==
The current mayor in Camrose is PJ Stasko, and Malcolm Boyd is the city's manager. The Camrose City Council is made up of the mayor and eight elected councillors, all at large. The current MP is Pierre Poilievre, and the current MLA is Jackie Lovely.

=== Camrose Police Service ===
Camrose Police Service Service de police de Camrose
- Motto: Serving with honour. Acting with courage.

Agency overview
- Formed: 1956

Jurisdictional structure
- Operations jurisdiction: Canada
- Legal jurisdiction: Municipal

Operational structure
- Elected officer responsible: The Honourable Kaycee Madu, Minister of Justice and Solicitor General
- Agency executive: Dean LaGrange, Chief of police

Website
- Official website

The Camrose Police Service (CPS; French: Service de police de Camrose) is the municipal law enforcement agency for the City of Camrose. Planning for Camrose's first municipal police service began in 1955 after incorporating as a city. The CPS officially began operating on July 1, 1956 with Howard Martin serving as its first chief of police. Its current chief of police is Dean LaGrange.

== Infrastructure ==
Camrose is served by Camrose Airport.

Camrose's water supply comes from nearby Driedmeat Lake.

== Education ==
=== Secondary ===
Three authorities provide secondary schooling in Camrose, including the Battle River School Division (BRSD), Conseil Scolaire Centre-Nord (CSCN) and Elk Island Catholic Schools (EICS). The BRSD operates 37 schools in Camrose and the surrounding area. EICS operates one elementary school (St. Patrick Catholic School) and one junior/senior high-school (Our Lady of Mount Pleasant Catholic School). CSCN operates one school (École des Fondateurs).

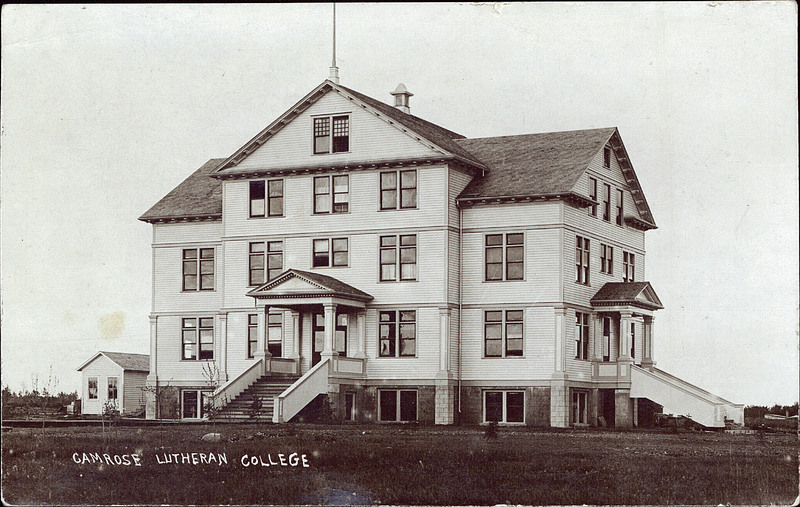
Camrose Lutheran College

=== Post-secondary ===
The primary post-secondary institution in Camrose is the Augustana Faculty of the University of Alberta (formerly known as Augustana University College). Established in 1910 by Norwegian settlers, under the name Camrose Lutheran College.

In 2006, the university celebrated its first fourth generation graduate.

Camrose also hosts the Canadian Lutheran Bible Institute, and formerly Gardner College (previously known as Gardner Bible College and Alberta Bible Institute).

== Media ==
Camrose is served by two local papers. Formerly, the weekly Camrose Canadian, was published up until August 9, 2018 when its parent company announced that it was ceasing production. The weekly Camrose Booster and the small daily, Camrose Morning News. There is also a local Christian paper published monthly called "Crosswalk".

Camrose is also home to two radio stations. The first is AM station 840 CFCW. Despite having a studio in West Edmonton Mall, CFCW still has its main broadcast studio in Camrose.

The second station is the much-newer FM station, New Country 98.1. Both stations are owned by Stingray Radio.

== Sister cities ==
The City of Camrose has had twinning agreements with several communities in Canada and internationally. These relationships have been used to promote goodwill, education, cultural exchange, tourism and economic connections.

Current and former sister-city relationships include:

- Kamifurano, Hokkaido, Japan – established September 5, 1985; terminated in 2026
- Kentville, Nova Scotia, Canada
- Saguenay, Quebec, Canada
- Warwick, Queensland, Australia
- Yichun, Heilongjiang, China

== Notable people ==
- Tyler Bouck, retired professional hockey player
- Isabel Dawson (1917–1982), British Columbia politician and cabinet minister
- Robert Wagner Dowling (1924–2019), Alberta politician and cabinet minister
- Brennan Evans, former professional hockey player
- Scott Ferguson, retired professional hockey player
- Steve Gotaas, retired professional hockey player
- Josh Green, retired professional hockey player
- Deena Hinshaw, deputy Provincial Health Officer of British Columbia, former Alberta Chief Medical Officer
- Jim Horsman, Alberta politician and former Deputy Premier
- Kenneth E. Iverson (1920–2004), computer scientist and Turing Award recipient
- LeRoy Johnson, educator and Alberta politician
- Parker Kelly, professional hockey player
- Justin Kirkland, professional hockey player
- Tiny Mills (1912–1987), professional wrestler
- Verlyn Olson, member of the Alberta Legislature from 2008 to 2015
- Karl Stollery, former professional hockey player
- Chester Ronning (1894–1984), educator, politician and diplomat
