= Municipal elections in Calgary =

Elections of city in Alberta, Canada

This article provides a list of Mayors and Councillors elected to Calgary City Council, the governing body for the city of Calgary, Alberta, Canada.

== Length of term ==
The first municipal election in Calgary took place in 1884 where Mayor George Murdoch and four councillors were elected to serve as Calgary's first council. Mayor and Councillors were elected for one year terms annually from 1884 until 1912, after which Councillors were elected to serve staggered two year terms. In 1923, the length of term for a Mayor was extended to two years to match the period for councillors. In 1971 the term for Mayor and Councillors was extended from two years, to three years and provisions related to staggered election of Councillors were removed. In 2013, amendments to the Local Authorities Election Act extended the term for the Mayor and Councillors to four years.

== Electoral wards ==
The Mayor of Calgary has always been elected at-large by the electors of the city.

Calgary became a town in 1884. In the early history of Calgary from 1884 to 1888, three Councillors were elected at-large by all electors, then from 1888 to 1893, six Councillors were elected.

Following the passage of the Calgary Charter (Ordinance 33 of 1893), which provided "City" status to Calgary, the Councillors were elected to represent wards of the City.

From 1894 to 1904, the City was divided into three wards, each represented by three Councillors, for a total of nine Councillors.

Council expanded in 1905 with the introduction of a fourth ward, which also received three Councillors, for a total of 12 Councillors. with the structure remaining in place until 1912.

The ward system was eliminated in 1913, and a City Council consisting of twelve Councillors were elected at-large from 1914 to 1960, half of them up for election each time (with exceptions).

In 1961, the City was divided into six wards with two Councillors elected for each ward. In 1977 the City was divided into fourteen wards with one Councillor elected to represent each ward, which has remained the structure of Calgary City Council to the present date.

== Other elected officials ==
During the 1910s, and 1920s the residents elected City Commissioners, which were in charge of the Administration of the municipality. School board elections are also held in line with city council elections. Hospital boards were also elected in various city elections in Calgary.

== Methods of voting ==
From 1906 to 1913, the 12 councillors were elected in four wards, three to each ward. Aldermanic elections were held yearly, using block voting (each voter had as many votes as there were seats to fill.

In 1913, Calgary moved to at-large elections with the city as one large district. Block voting was used, with each voter allowed to cast as many votes as the number of open seats.

In 1917 Calgary brought in a system of Proportional Representation, under which city councillors were elected at-large using Single Transferable Voting (STV) and one multiple-member district covering the whole city. (The mayor was elected through Instant-runoff voting.) This survived until 1961. This system is said to have produced the emergence and increased representation of neighbourhood or community-based political groups.

In 1961, Calgary switched to a ward system in which multiple city councillors were elected in each ward using STV, in 1961 and 1971.

For other elections held from 1962 to 1970, councillors sat in staggered terms, with usually only one in each ward up for election each time. The elections in between were mostly held according to Alternative Voting in which one councillor was elected in each ward.

From 1962 to 1970, staggered terms meant mostly only one councillor was elected each election in each ward each year. That plus the retention of single transferable voting meant Alternative Voting, instead of Single Transferable Vote (STV). (Two times there were two vacancies in a ward due to resignation or other cause and multi-winner STV was used to fill the ward seats.)

Previous to 1971 election, terms of aldermanic service were extended to three years, and all ward seats were elected simultaneously in 1971, through Single Transferable Vote. This was Calgary's last election held using Single Transferable Vote, and would be the last one in Canada up to the present.

== Title of elected officials ==
From 1884 to 2010 the title for elected officials on Calgary City Council excluding the Mayor, was Alderman, although Councillor was used interchangeably during that period. On December 14, 2010, council voted to change the title to councillor, which took effect in the October 2013 election.

== List of Calgary municipal elections 1884-Present ==
=== Town of Calgary ===
	Election	Date	Term	Elected Mayor	Aldermen/ Councillors		Ballots	Notes
Calgary uses at-large voting, with councillors elected through Plurality block voting
1	1884	December 3	December 4, 1884; January 18, 1886 (1 year, 45 days)	George Murdoch	Simon John Clarke; Simon Jackson Hogg	Joseph Henry Millward; Neville James Lindsay	218	(Note: Simon Jackson Hogg would resign May 20, 1885, and Issac Sanford Freeze would be acclaimed to Council and installed on June 10, 1885.)
2	(Jan) 1886	January 4	January 18, 1886; October 21, 1886 (276 days)	George Murdoch	Joseph Henry Millward; Isaac Sanford Freeze	James Bannerman; Neville James Lindsay	208	(Note: Northwest Territorial Ordinance 1-1886 voided the results of the January 1886 election and stated no Council existed in Calgary.)
3	(Nov) 1886	November 3	November 4, 1886; January 16, 1888 (1 year, 73 days)	George Clift King	Arthur Edwin Shelton; John Ellis	Alexander Allan; James Morris Martin	367	
4	1888	January 3	January 16, 1888; January 21, 1889 (1 year, 5 days)	Arthur Edwin Shelton	Wesley Fletcher Orr; Henry Collins; James Campbell Linton	Alexander Allan; Howard Douglas; John Gillies McCallum		
5	1889	January 7	January 21, 1889; January 20, 1890 (364 days)	Daniel Webster Marsh	Wesley Fletcher Orr; James Gerald Fitzgerald; George Clift King	James Bannerman; Archibald Grant; George Murdoch	-	All Acclaimed
6	1890	January 6	January 20, 1890; January 19, 1891 (364 days)	James Delamere Lafferty	Wesley Fletcher Orr; Howard Douglas; Alexander McBride	William Henry Cushing; Joseph Maw; Wesley Fletcher Orr	240	
7	1891	January 5	January 19, 1891; January 18, 1892 (364 days)	James Reilly	Frederick George Topp; William Henry Cushing; George Clift King	James Bannerman; Howard Douglas; Alexander Lucas	381	
8	1892	January 4	January 18, 1892; January 16, 1893 (364 days)	Alexander Lucas	James Reilly; Isaac Sanford Freeze; Alexander McBride	William Henry Cushing; George Clift King; Wesley Fletcher Orr		
9	1893	January 2	January 16, 1893; January 2, 1894 (351 days)	Alexander Lucas	Wendell Maclean; Robert John Hutchings; Joseph Henry Millward	John Simcoe Feehan; Wendell Maclean; Wesley Fletcher Orr	332	
City of Calgary Calgary introduces a Ward system for Aldermen, with aldermen elected through Plurality block voting
10	(Jan) 1894	January 15	January 17, 1894; January 7, 1895 (355 days)	Wesley Fletcher Orr	Ward 1: Alexander Lucas; Ward 1: Arthur Leslie Cameron; Ward 1: Joseph Mckay Bannerman; Ward 2: Joseph Edward Jacques; Ward 2: Robert John Hutchings	Ward 2: John August Nolan; Ward 3: John Simcoe Feehan; Ward 3: Alexander McBride; Ward 3: Thomas Underwood	464	(Note: First election in Calgary under three ward system.) (Note: Howard Douglas acclaimed on February 28, 1894, after Thomas Underwood failed to be sworn in within one month of the January 1894 election due to inability to return from England in time.) (Note: Joseph Henry Millward elected in a by-election scheduled July 4, 1894, following Joseph Edward Jacques' resignation which was accepted by Council on June 12, 1894. Millward defeated Thomson, and George Murdoch for the seat.) (Note: James Stuart Makie elected in a by-election scheduled October 2, 1894, following Joseph Henry Millward's resignation.)
11	(Dec) 1894	December 10	January 7, 1895; January 6, 1896 (364 days)	Wesley Fletcher Orr	Ward 1: Silas Alexander Ramsay; Ward 1: William Mahon Parslow; Ward 1: Peter McCarthy; Ward 2: James Stuart Mackie; Ward 2: George Murdoch	Ward 2: John Creighton; Ward 3: Walter Jarrett; Ward 3: Thomas Underwood; Ward 3: William Henry Cushing		
12	1895	December 9	January 6, 1896; January 4, 1897 (364 days)	Alexander McBride	Ward 1: Silas Alexander Ramsay; Ward 1: James Alexander McKenzie; Ward 1: William Mahon Parslow; Ward 2: John Creighton; Ward 2: James Stuart Mackie	Ward 2: Henry Brown; Ward 3: William Henry Cushing; Ward 3: Adam Robson McTavish; Ward 3: Walter Jarrett		
13	1896	December 14	January 4, 1897; January 3, 1898 (364 days)	Wesley Fletcher Orr	Ward 1: William Pitman Jr. Ward 1: Silas Alexander Ramsay; Ward 1: William Mahon Parslow; Ward 2: Arthur Leslie Cameron; Ward 2: Neville James Lindsay	Ward 2: Henry Brown; Ward 3: Walter Jarrett; Ward 3: Adam Robson McTavish; Ward 3: Thomas Underwood		All Acclaimed (Note: Henry Brown resigned from Council effective April 6, 1897, and Thomas O'Brien was acclaimed to the seat after nominations closed April 21, 1897.)
14	1897	December 13	January 3, 1898; January 3, 1899 (1 year, 0 days)	Arthur Leslie Cameron	Ward 1: Silas Alexander Ramsay; Ward 1: Alexander McBride; Ward 1: William Hugh Kinnisten; Ward 2: James Stuart Mackie; Ward 2: Thomas O'Brien	Ward 2: Robert John Hutchings; Ward 3: Adam Robson McTavish; Ward 3: Thomas Underwood; Ward 3: Walter Jarrett	-	
15	1898	December 12	January 3, 1899; January 2, 1900 (364 days)	James Reilly	Ward 1: Robert Wilson Begley; Ward 1: James Alexander McKenzie; Ward 1: Solomon Sheldwyn Spafford; Ward 2: Robert John Hutchings; Ward 2: James Stuart Mackie	Ward 2: Thomas O'Brien; Ward 3: George Albert Allen; Ward 3: Isaac Stephen Gerow Van Wart; Ward 3: Thomas Underwood	352	(Note: George Albert Allen resigned from Council effective April 20, 1899, and William Henry Cushing won the seat in a by-election.)
16	1899	December 11	January 2, 1900; January 7, 1901 (1 year, 5 days)	William Henry Cushing	Ward 1: Thomas Alexander Hatfield; Ward 1: William Mahon Parslow; Ward 1: Solomon Sheldwyn Spafford; Ward 2: James Hedley Grierson; Ward 2: John Creighton	Ward 2: Hugh Neilson; Ward 3: Donald J. Gunn; Ward 3: Isaac Stephen Gerow Van Wart; Ward 3: Thomas Underwood	375	(Note: All Alderman candidates for council were acclaimed.)
17	1900	December 10	January 7, 1901; January 6, 1902 (364 days)	James Stuart Mackie	Ward 1: Thomas Alexander Hatfield; Ward 1: James Alexander McKenzie; Ward 1: Solomon Sheldwyn Spafford; Ward 2: John Creighton; Ward 2: Richard Benjamin O'Sullivan	Ward 2: John Jackson Young; Ward 3: Joseph Edward Eckersley; Ward 3: Thomas Underwood; Ward 3: John Emerson		
18	1901	December 9	January 6, 1902; January 5, 1903 (364 days)	Thomas Underwood	Ward 1: Thomas Alexander Hatfield; Ward 1: William Mahon Parslow; Ward 1: Silas Alexander Ramsay; Ward 2: John Creighton; Ward 2: William Henry Cushing	Ward 2: John Jackson Young; Ward 3: William Charles Gordon Armstrong; Ward 3: Isaac Stephen Gerow Van Wart; Ward 3: James Abel Hornby		(Note: John Creighton died on July 29, 1902, and John Hamilton Kerr was acclaimed as Alderman for Ward 2 after close of nominations on September 1, 1902.)
19	1902	December 8	January 5, 1903; January 5, 1904 (1 year, 0 days)	Thomas Underwood	Ward 1: Owen Herbert Bott; Ward 1: John Emerson; Ward 1: Silas Alexander Ramsay; Ward 2: William John Binning; Ward 2: William Carson	Ward 2: John Irwin; Ward 3: William Charles Gordon Armstrong; Ward 3: James Abel Hornby; Ward 3: Richard Addison Brocklebank		(Note: William Carson declined office in letter to City Clerk on December 18, 1902, William Henry Cushing was elected Alderman for Ward 2 in a by-election.)
20	1903	December 14	January 5, 1904; January 2, 1905 (363 days)	Silas Alexander Ramsay	Ward 1: John Emerson; Ward 1: John Thomas Macdonald; Ward 1: James Alexander McKenzie; Ward 2: William Henry Cushing; Ward 2: John Irwin	Ward 2: John Hamilton Kerr; Ward 3: Simon John Clarke; Ward 3: Thomas Underwood; Ward 3: James Abel Hornby		(Note: John Thomas Macdonald and James Alexander McKenzie would resign from office on April 2, 1904, with Owen Herbert Bott and John Rawlings Thompson elected in a by-election to sit as Ward 1 Aldermen.)
21	1904	December 12	January 2, 1905; January 2, 1906 (1 year, 0 days)	John Emerson	Ward 1: William Leigh Bernard; Ward 1: Silas Alexander Ramsay; Ward 1: John Rawlings Thompson; Ward 2: William Head; Ward 2: Charles Allan Stuart	Ward 2: Robert Cadogan Thomas; Ward 3: Richard Addison Brocklebank; Ward 3: Clifford Teasdale Jones; Ward 3: Simon John Clarke		(Note: William Leigh Bernard declined the office of Aldermen, James Abel Hornby was elected in by-election as Aldermen for Ward 1.)
22	1905	December 11	January 2, 1906; January 14, 1907 (1 year, 12 days)	John Emerson	Ward 1: Charles McMillan; Ward 1: William Pitman Jr. Ward 1: Silas Alexander Ramsay; Ward 2: John Smythe Hall; Ward 2: William George Hunt; Ward 2: George Thomas Young	Ward 3: Simon John Clarke; Ward 3: John William Mitchell; Ward 4: David Carter; Ward 3: Arthur Garnet Graves; Ward 4: Clifford Teasdale Jones; Ward 4: Robert James Stuart		(Note: David Carter died on July 1, 1906, and was replaced by John Goodwin Watson in a by-election as Alderman for Ward 4. John Smythe Hall resigned as Alderman for Ward 2 effective November 30, 1906.)
23	1906	December 10	January 14, 1907; January 2, 1908 (353 days)	Arthur Leslie Cameron	Ward 1: Alfred Moodie; Ward 1: Silas Alexander Ramsay; Ward 1: Robert Suitor; Ward 2: William Henry Manarey; Ward 2: Harry William White; Ward 2: George Thomas Young	Ward 3: Simon John Clarke; Ward 3: John William Mitchell; Ward 4: Charles McMillan; Ward 3: Arthur Garnet Graves; Ward 4: Clifford Bernard Reilly; Ward 4: John Goodwin Watson		
24	1907	December 9	January 2, 1908; January 2, 1909 (1 year, 0 days)	Arthur Leslie Cameron	Ward 1: Alfred Moodie; Ward 1: Adoniram Judson Samis; Ward 1: Robert Suitor; Ward 2: William Henry Manarey; Ward 2: George Thomas Callender Robinson; Ward 2: Alfred Marmaduke Terrill	Ward 3: Arthur Garnet Graves; Ward 3: John William Mitchell; Ward 4: William Mahon Parslow; Ward 3: James Abel Hornby; Ward 4: Robert James Stuart; Ward 4: John Goodwin Watson		
25	1908	December 14	January 2, 1909; January 3, 1910 (1 year, 1 day)	Reuben Rupert Jamieson	Ward 1: George Nelson Erb; Ward 1: Alfred Moodie; Ward 1: John Leslie Speer; Ward 2: Frederick Joseph Green; Ward 2: Edward George King; Ward 2: William Henry Manarey	Ward 3: Richard Addison Brocklebank; Ward 3: Milton Ross Wallace; Ward 4: William Egbert; Ward 3: John William Mitchell; Ward 4: Clifford Bernard Reilly; Ward 4: John Goodwin Watson		
26	1909	December 13	January 3, 1910; January 2, 1911 (364 days)	Reuben Rupert Jamieson	Ward 1: Malcolm Halladay; Ward 1: George Henry Ross; Ward 1: George Ernest Wood; Ward 2: William Ross; Ward 2: James Smalley; Ward 2: One Vacancy	Ward 3: Richard Addison Brocklebank; Ward 3: Milton Ross Wallace; Ward 4: William Egbert; Ward 3: John William Mitchell; Ward 4: Clifford Teasdale Jones; Ward 4: Clifford Bernard Reilly		
27	1910	December 12	January 2, 1911; January 2, 1912 (1 year, 0 days)	John William Mitchell	Ward 1: Magnus Brown; Ward 1: Alfred Bruce Cushing; Ward 1: Adoniram Judson Samis; Ward 2: William Thomas Daniel Lathwell; Ward 2: Donald McDonald; Ward 2: William Ross Sr.	Ward 3: Richard Addison Brocklebank; Ward 3: Stanley Brown Ramsey; Ward 4: James Hay Garden; Ward 3: James Abel Hornby; Ward 4: Clifford Teasdale Jones; Ward 4: John Goodwin Watson		
28	1911	December 11	January 2, 1912; January 2, 1913 (1 year, 0 days)	John William Mitchell	Ward 1: Magnus Brown; Ward 1: Charles Henry Minchin; Ward 1: Adoniram Judson Samis; Ward 2: Shibley Goldsmith Carscallen; Ward 2: Alexander Clarence McDougall; Ward 2: Frank Russell Riley	Ward 3: Richard Addison Brocklebank; Ward 3: Stanley Brown Ramsey; Ward 4: George W Morfitt; Ward 3: James Abel Hornby; Ward 4: John Goodwin Watson; Ward 4: Reuben Switzer Whaley		
29	1912	December 9	January 2, 1913; January 2, 1914 (1 year, 0 days)	Herbert Arthur Sinnott	Ward 1: Stanley Gordon Freeze; Ward 1: Thomas Alfred Presswood Frost; Ward 1: George Henry Ross; Ward 2: Herbert Bealey Adshead; Ward 2: Shibley Goldsmith Carscallen; Ward 2: William Ross Sr.	Ward 3: Samuel Allen Carson; Ward 3: Stanley Brown Ramsey; Ward 4: Michael Copps Costello; Ward 3: Douglas Ralph Crichton; Ward 4: James Hay Garden; Ward 4: William John Tregillus		
The Mayor is elected to a one-year term. Wards are dropped. Aldermen are elected at-large to one- or two-year terms.
30	1913	December 8	January 2, 1914; January 2, 1915 (1 year, 0 days); January 2, 1914; January 3, 1916 (2 years, 1 day)	Herbert Arthur Sinnott	Donald Hope (1Y); Douglas Ralph Crichton (1Y); Herbert Bealey Adshead (1Y); Isaac Gideon Ruttle (1Y); William John Tregillus (1Y); William George Hunt (1Y)	Edward Henry Crandell (2Y); Harold William Hounsfield Riley (2Y); Michael Copps Costello (2Y); Stanley Gordon Freeze (2Y); Thomas Alfred Presswood Frost (2Y); William Ross Sr. (2Y)		
The Mayor is elected to a one-year term. Aldermen are elected to alternating two-year terms.
31	1914	December 14	January 2, 1915; January 2, 1917 (2 years, 0 days)	Michael Copps Costello	John William Mitchell; Arthur Walter Ellson Fawkes; Isaac Gideon Ruttle	James Abel Hornby; John Leslie Jennison; John Sidney Arnold; Douglas Ralph Crichton (1Y)		
32	1915	December 13	January 3, 1916; January 2, 1918 (1 year, 364 days)	Michael Copps Costello	Samuel Hunter Adams; Robert Colin Marshall; John McNeill; Allan Poyntz Patrick (1Y)	Adoniram Judson Samis; Thomas John Searle Skinner; George Frederick Tull; Robert John Tallon (1Y)		
33	1916	December 11	January 2, 1917; January 2, 1919 (2 years, 0 days)	Michael Copps Costello	John Sidney Arnold; Herbert Bealey Adshead; Alexander McTaggart	Allan Poyntz Patrick; Isaac Gideon Ruttle; Robert John Tallon; Andrew Graham Broatch (1Y)		
Calgary changed to STV/PR system for councillors. Mayor to be elected through Instant-runoff voting.
34	1917	December 10	January 2, 1918; January 2, 1920 (2 years, 0 days)	Michael Copps Costello	Samuel Hunter Adams; Frank Roy Freeze; Hannah Gale; James Bernard Creagan (1Y); Frederick John Marshall (1Y)	Albert Mahaffy; Robert Colin Marshall; Andrew Graham Broatch; Philip Dorland Sprung (1Y)		
35	1918	December 9	January 2, 1919; January 3, 1921 (2 years, 1 day)	Robert Colin Marshall	David Ernest Black; Frederick Arthur Johnston; John McCoubrey; Isaac Gideon Ruttle (1Y)	Alexander McTaggart; Frederick Ernest Osborne; Fred J. White		(Note: Issac G. Ruttle was elected for a one-year term to replace Robert Colin Marshall who resigned half way through his term as Alderman.)
36	1919	December 10	January 2, 1920; January 3, 1922 (2 years, 1 day)	Robert Colin Marshall	Andrew Graham Broatch; Frederick Lowry Shouldice; Hannah Gale	Frank Roy Freeze; George Harry Webster; Samuel Hunter Adams		
37	1920	December 15	January 3, 1921; January 2, 1923 (1 year, 364 days)	Samuel Hunter Adams	John Sidney Arnold; John William Hugill; Alexander McTaggart; Neil I. McDermid (1Y)	Charles Stevenson; Fred J. White; Walter Little; Geoffrey Silvester (1Y)		(Note: Geoffrey Silvester and Neil I. McDermid were both elected to one year terms following the resignation of Samuel Hunter Adams to run for Mayor.)
38	1921	December 14	January 3, 1922; January 2, 1924 (1 year, 364 days)	Samuel Hunter Adams	George Harry Webster; George David Batchelor; Andrew Davison	Robert Henry Parkyn; Hannah Gale; James Hay Garden		
39	1922	December 13	January 2, 1923; January 2, 1925 (2 years, 0 days)	George Harry Webster	Thomas Henry Crawford; Frederick Arthur Johnston; Frederick Ernest Osborne; Walter Little (1Y)	Neil I. McDermid; Fred J. White; John Walker Russell		
The Mayor is elected to a two-year term. Aldermen are elected to alternating two year terms.
40	1923	December 12	January 2, 1924; January 2, 1926 (2 years, 0 days)	George Harry Webster	Andrew Davison; Thomas Alexander Hornibrook; Walter Little	William Henry Ross; Samuel Stanley Savage; Robert Cadogan Thomas		
41	1924	December 10	January 2, 1925; January 2, 1927 (2 years, 0 days)	Continuing in Office	Peter Turner Bone; Thomas Henry Crawford (died November 1925); Eneas Edward McCormick	John Walker Russell; Reuben Weldon Ward; Fred J. White		
42	1925	December 16	January 2, 1926; January 3, 1928 (2 years, 1 day)	George Harry Webster	Robert Cadogan Thomas; Robert Henry Parkyn (Labor); Andrew Davison (Labor); William Henry Ross (1Y)	Thomas Alexander Hornibrook; Frank Roy Freeze; Samuel Stanley Savage		
43	1926	December 15	January 3, 1927; January 2, 1929 (1 year, 365 days)	Frederick Ernest Osborne	Eneas Edward McCormick; Harold Wigmore McGill; Edith Patterson; Frederick Charles Manning (1Y)	John Walker Russell; Reuben Weldon Ward; Peter Turner Bone		
44	1927	December 14	January 3, 1928; January 1, 1930 (1 year, 363 days)	Frederick Ernest Osborne	Frank Roy Freeze; Thomas Alexander Hornibrook; Frederick Charles Manning	Robert Henry Parkyn; Samuel Stanley Savage; William Howell Arthur Thomas		
45	1928	December 12	January 2, 1929; December 31, 1930 (1 year, 363 days)	Continuing in Office	Peter Turner Bone; Andrew Davison; Eneas Edward McCormick	Harold Wigmore McGill; Edith Patterson; Fred J. White		
46	1929	November 20	January 1, 1930; December 31, 1931 (1 year, 364 days)	Andrew Davison	Robert Henry Parkyn; Robert Henry Weir; Pansy Louise Pue; John Walker Russell (1Y)	Joseph Hope Ross; Samuel Stanley Savage; Jean Romeo Cyr-Miquelon		
47	1930	November 19	January 1, 1931; December 31, 1932 (1 year, 365 days)	Continuing in Office	Wilmot Douglas Milner; Fred J. White; Charles Edward Carr	Lloyd Hamilton Fenerty; Ralph William Patterson; John Walker Russell		
48	1931	November 18	January 1, 1932; December 31, 1933 (1 year, 364 days)	Andrew Davison	Harold William Hounsfield Riley; Jean Romeo Cyr-Miquelon; Samuel Stanley Savage	Edith Patterson; Pansy Louise Pue; Robert Henry Weir		
49	1932	November 23	January 1, 1933; December 31, 1934 (1 year, 364 days)	Continuing in Office	Peter Turner Bone; William Ayer Lincoln; Robert Henry Parkyn; Joseph Hope Ross (1Y)	John Walker Russell; Fred J. White; Harry Humble		
50	1933	November 22	January 1, 1934; December 31, 1935 (1 year, 364 days)	Andrew Davison	Joseph Brown Seymour; Alexander John MacMillan; William George Southern	Joseph Hope Ross; Harold William Hounsfield Riley; Robert Henry Weir		
51	1934	November 21	January 1, 1935; December 31, 1936 (1 year, 365 days)	Continuing in Office	Douglas Cunnington; Frank Roy Freeze; William Ayer Lincoln	Robert Henry Parkyn; Aylmer John Eggert Liesemer; Fred J. White		
52	1935	November 20	January 1, 1936; December 31, 1937 (1 year, 364 days)	Andrew Davison	Alexander John MacMillan; William George Southern; Rose Wilkinson; James Gourley (1Y)	Robert Henry Weir; Douglas Cameron Sinclair; James William Gillman		
53	1936	November 18	January 1, 1937; December 31, 1938 (1 year, 364 days)	Continuing in Office	Frederick Hamilton Lepper; Douglas Cunnington; James Gourley	Aylmer John Eggert Liesemer; Arthur Calway Rowe; Frank Roy Freeze		
54	1937	November 17	January 1, 1938; December 31, 1939 (1 year, 364 days)	Andrew Davison	Ernest Arlington McCullough; Rose Wilkinson; Hedley Robert Chauncey; George Marshall Brown (1Y)	Robert Henry Weir; James Caven Mahaffy; William George Southern		
55	1938	November 23	January 1, 1939; December 31, 1940 (1 year, 365 days)	Continuing in Office	George Marshall Brown; Frank Roy Freeze; George Cullis Lancaster	Patrick Denis Lenihan; Douglas Cunnington; Robert Henry Parkyn		
56	1939	November 22	January 1, 1940; December 31, 1941 (1 year, 364 days)	Andrew Davison	Robert Henry Weir; James Caven Mahaffy; William George Southern; Fred J. White (1Y)	Hedley Robert Chauncey; Ernest Arlington McCullough; Rose Wilkinson		
57	1940	November 20	January 1, 1941; December 31, 1942 (1 year, 364 days)	Continuing in Office	Fred J. White; Frank Roy Freeze; David Smith Moffat; Ernest Henry Starr (1Y)	Reginald George Smith; George Marshall Brown; George Cullis Lancaster		
58	1941	November 24	January 1, 1942; December 31, 1943 (1 year, 364 days)	Andrew Davison	Hedley Robert Chauncey; Ernest Arlington McCullough; William George Southern	Ernest Henry Starr; Robert Henry Weir; Rose Wilkinson		All Council Acclaimed
59	1942	November 18	January 1, 1943; December 31, 1944 (1 year, 365 days)	Continuing in Office	Robert Thomas Alderman; George Marshall Brown; Frank Roy Freeze	George Cullis Lancaster; David Smith Moffat; Reginald George Smith		All Council Acclaimed
60	1943	November 17	January 1, 1944; December 31, 1945 (1 year, 364 days)	Andrew Davison	Frederick James Chalk; Hedley Robert Chauncey; Ernest Arlington McCullough	Ernest Henry Starr; James Cameron Watson; Rose Wilkinson		All Council Acclaimed
61	1944	November 22	January 1, 1945; December 31, 1946 (1 year, 364 days)	Continuing in Office	James Mitchell Cairns; Robert Thomas Alderman; George Marshall Brown	Reginald George Smith; George Cullis Lancaster; Frank Roy Freeze		
62	1945	November 21	January 1, 1946; December 31, 1947 (1 year, 364 days)	James Cameron Watson	Donald Hugh Mackay; Peter Newton Russel Morrison; Rose Wilkinson	Frederick Clarence Manning; James Thomas Edwards; Ernest Henry Starr		
63	1946	November 20	January 1, 1947; December 31, 1948 (1 year, 365 days)	Continuing in Office	Robert Thomas Alderman; Frederick Charles Colborne; George Marshall Brown	Frank Roy Freeze; George Cullis Lancaster; Donald Fraser McIntosh		
64	1947	November 19	January 1, 1948; December 31, 1949 (1 year, 364 days)	James Cameron Watson	Manley Justin Edwards; Albert Earl Aikenhead; Donald Hugh Mackay; Paul Ralph Brecken (1Y)	Gordon Gilbert Cushing; Rose Wilkinson; Peter Newton Russel Morrison		
65	1948	November 17	January 1, 1949; December 31, 1950 (1 year, 364 days)	Continuing in Office	George Marshall Brown; Arthur Noel Hutchinson; Donald Fraser McIntosh	Frederick Parker; Paul Ralph Brecken; Charles Constantine Connolly		
66	1949	November 23	January 1, 1950; December 31, 1951 (1 year, 364 days)	Donald Hugh MacKay	Mary Julia Cross Dover; Robert Bryson Corley; Neil Douglas McDermid; James Leslie Hill (1Y)	Peter Newton Russel Morrison; Rose Wilkinson; Robert Thomas Alderman; Ernest Henry Starr (1Y)		
67	1950	November 22	January 1, 1951; October 20, 1952 (1 year, 293 days)	Continuing in Office	William Ross Upton; James Leslie Hill; Donald Fraser McIntosh	Walter Herbert Sydney Boote; Arthur Noel Hutchinson; Frederick Parker		
68	1951	November 21	January 1, 1952; October 19, 1953 (1 year, 291 days)	Donald Hugh MacKay	Rosamond Elizabeth Owens Wilkinson; Mary Julia Cross Dover; Peter Newton Russel Morrison	Paul Ralph Brecken; Gordon Stanley Houghton; Edward Bruce Watson		
69	1952	October 15	October 20, 1952; October 18, 1954 (1 year, 363 days)	2nd year of two-year term	Ernest Henry Starr; Walter Herbert Sydney Boote; Frederick Parker	Donald Fraser McIntosh; Elmer Bowling Lyle; Isabella Kathleen Little Stevens		
70	1953	October 14	October 19, 1953; October 24, 1955 (2 years, 5 days)	Donald Hugh MacKay	Melvin Earl Shannon; Paul Ralph Brecken; Peter Newton Russel Morrison; Edward Bruce Watson	Donald Hugh MacKay; Grant MacEwan; Rosamond Elizabeth Owens Wilkinson; Arthur Ryan Smith		(Note: Melvin Earl Shannon was elected to a one year term as Alderman following the resignation of Donald Fraser McIntosh earlier in 1953 part way through his two year term.)
71	1954	October 13	October 18, 1954; October 22, 1956 (2 years, 4 days)	2nd year of two-year term	Ernest Henry Starr; Kennett Irvin Lyle; Douglas Alexander McKay	Walter Herbert Sydney Boote; Donald Fraser McIntosh; Frederick Parker		
72	1955	October 19	October 24, 1955; October 21, 1957 (1 year, 362 days)	Donald Hugh MacKay	Isabella Kathleen Little Stevens; James David Macdonald; Clarence Frank Mack	Paul Ralph Brecken; Grant MacEwan; Peter Newton Russel Morrison		
73	1956	October 17	October 22, 1956; October 20, 1958 (1 year, 363 days)	2nd year of two-year term	Ernest Henry Starr; Edward Bruce Watson; Donald Fraser McIntosh	Walter Peter Rowan; Mary Julia Cross Dover; Ernest John Munson		
74	1957	October 16	October 21, 1957; October 19, 1959 (1 year, 363 days)	Donald Hugh MacKay	Isabella Kathleen Little Stevens; John Jeffery Hanna; Paul Ralph Brecken; James David Macdonald	Arthur J. Dixon; Grant MacEwan; Asa Milton Harradence; Peter Newton Russel Morrison		(Note: Arthur J. Dixon and John Jeffery Hanna elected to a single year terms to replace Walter Peter Rowan who died in the Trans-Canada Air Lines Flight 810 on December 9, 1956, and Ernest Henry Starr who resigned September 15, 1957, half way through his two year term.)
75	1958	October 15	October 20, 1958; October 24, 1960 (2 years, 4 days)	2nd year of two-year term	Mark Tennant; Mary Julia Cross Dover; Clarence Frank Mack; Ernest Henry Starr	John Jeffery Hanna; Donald Fraser McIntosh; James David Macdonald; Edward Bruce Watson (1Y)		(Note: James David Macdonald resigned effective August 17, 1959.) (Note: Edward Bruce Watson elected to a single year term to replace Grant MacEwan who resigned October 10, 1958, half way through his two year term.)
76	1959	October 14	October 19, 1959; October 23, 1961 (2 years, 4 days)	Harry Hays	Edward Bruce Watson; James Logan Hannah; Grant MacEwan	Paul Ralph Brecken; George Ho Lem; Peter Newton Russel Morrison		
77	1960	October 19	October 24, 1960; October 23, 1961 (364 days)	2nd year of two-year term	Runo Carl Berglund; Mark Tennant; Donald Fraser Mcintosh; Ernest Henry Starr	Runo Carl Berglund; Clarence Frank Mack; David John Russell		(Note: The 1960 Calgary municipal election was the final election under the at-large system. The six elected Alderman would be in office for one year.)
All council seats become vacant as city switched to ward systems (while continuing the use of STV). In each ward the candidate for alderman with the most votes was elected for two years, candidates with the second most votes were elected for one. Elections held through the STV/PR system if multi-members elected, otherwise instant-runoff voting .
78	1961	October 18	October 23, 1961; October 21, 1963 (1 year, 363 days)	Harry Hays	Ward 1: George Ho Lem (2Y); Ward 1: Edward Bruce Watson (1Y); Ward 2: Roy Alexander Farran (2Y); Ward 2: Donald Fraser McIntosh (1Y); Ward 3: Edward David Duncan (2Y); Ward 3: Runo Carl Berglund (1Y)	Ward 4: Clarence Frank Mack (2Y); Ward 4: John Clifford Leslie (1Y); Ward 5: Peter Newton Russel Morrison (2Y); Ward 5: Ernest Henry Starr (1Y); Ward 6: Grant MacEwan (2Y); Ward 6: William Daniel Dickie (1Y)		(Note: The 1961 Calgary municipal election was the first election under the new Ward system, the candidate which received the highest number of ballots was elected for a two year term (2Y), and the second highest ballot total is elected for a one year term (1Y).)
Half the council seats become vacant each year as aldermen began to serve staggered terms. One seat in each ward elected through Alternative Voting each election. Only use of STV until 1970 was when a ward had two open seats through resignation or other cause.
79	1962	October 17	October 22, 1962; October 19, 1964 (1 year, 363 days)	2nd year of two-year term	Ward 1: Harold Raymond Ballard; Ward 2: Harold Philip Runions; Ward 3: Runo Carl Berglund	Ward 4: John Clifford Leslie; Ward 5: Ernest Henry Starr; Ward 6: William Daniel Dickie		(Note: Harry Hays would resign as Mayor on June 30, 1963, and Grant MacEwan was appointed Mayor by council effective July 4, 1963.)
80	1963	October 16	October 21, 1963; October 18, 1965 (1 year, 362 days)	Grant MacEwan	Ward 1: George Ho Lem; Ward 2: Mark Tennant; Ward 3: Edward David Duncan	Ward 4: Roy Victor Deyell; Ward 5: Walter Herbert Sydney Boote; Ward 6: David John Russell		
81	1964	October 14	October 19, 1964; October 24, 1966 (2 years, 5 days)	2nd year of two-year term	Ward 1: Harold Raymond Ballard; Ward 2: Roy Alexander Farran; Ward 3: Adrian Douglas Berry	Ward 4: John Clifford Leslie; Ward 5: Ernest Henry Starr; Ward 6: John Ellwood Davis		
82	1965	October 13	October 18, 1965; October 23, 1967 (2 years, 5 days)	Jack Leslie	Ward 1: Luther H. Goodwin; Ward 2: Mark Tennant; Ward 3: Bruce Edgar Langridge	Ward 4: Arthur Ryan Smith; Ward 4: Marion Albert Law; Ward 5: John Kushner; Ward 6: David John Russell		
83	1966	October 19	October 24, 1966; October 23, 1968 (1 year, 365 days)	2nd year of two-year term	Ward 1: Peter Petrasuk; Ward 2: Roy Alexander Farran; Ward 3: John Carleton Ayer	Ward 4: Marion Albert Law; Ward 5: James Vernon Gilkes; Ward 6: John Ellwood Davis		
84	1967	October 18	October 23, 1967; October 22, 1969 (1 year, 364 days)	Jack Leslie	Ward 1: Eric Charles Musgreave; Ward 2: Mark Tennant; Ward 3: Adrian Douglas Berry	Ward 4: Luther H. Goodwin; Ward 5: James Alexander McCambly; Ward 6: Leslie Carter Blackburn		
85	1968	October 16	October 23, 1968; October 25, 1971 (3 years, 2 days)	2nd year of two-year term	Ward 1: Peter Petrasuk; Ward 2: Roy Alexander Farran; Ward 2: Lorne Leslie Anger; Ward 3: John Carleton Ayer	Ward 4: Edward James Dooley; Ward 5: John Kushner; Ward 6: John Ellwood Davis		(Note: Lorne Leslie Anger was elected for a one year term following the resignation of Mark Tennant half way through his two year term.) (Note: Candidates in the 1968 Calgary municipal election served for a three year period until October 25, 1971, so all 12 members of council (half of council on overlapping terms) would expire together for the 1971 Calgary municipal election on October 13, 1971.)
86	1969	October 15	October 22, 1969; October 25, 1971 (2 years, 3 days)	Rod Sykes	Ward 1: Eric Charles Musgreave; Ward 2: Donald Adam Hartman; Ward 3: Adrian Douglas Berry	Ward 4: Luther H. Goodwin; Ward 5: Robert Stuart Harvey Greene; Ward 6: Thomas Priddle		
All Council terms are extended to three years and elected simultaneously, through the STV/PR system and wards.
87	1971	October 13	October 25, 1971; October 28, 1974 (3 years, 3 days)	Rod Sykes	Ward 1: Eric Charles Musgreave; Ward 1: Peter Petrasuk; Ward 2: Donald Adam Hartman; Ward 2: Robert Archibald Simpson; Ward 3: Adrian Douglas Berry; Ward 3: John Carleton Ayer	Ward 4: Barbara Ann Scott; Ward 4: Ed Oman; Ward 5: John Kushner; Ward 5: Gordon Wells Shrake; Ward 6: Ross Patterson Alger; Ward 6: Thomas Priddle		
Calgary ended its use of STV/PR and went to first past the post Block Voting system.
88	1974	October 16	October 28, 1974; October 31, 1977 (3 years, 3 days)	Rod Sykes	Ward 1: Marguerite Patricia Shook Donnelly; Ward 1: Maurice Edgar Ryan; Ward 2: Donald Adam Hartman; Ward 2: Robert Archibald Simpson; Ward 3: Virnetta Nelson Anderson; Ward 3: John Carleton Ayer	Ward 4: Barbara Ann Scott; Ward 4: Ed Oman; Ward 5: Harold Joseph Huish; Ward 5: Gordon Wells Shrake; Ward 6: Irene Leone Wellwood; Ward 6: Thomas Priddle		(Note: Thomas Priddle resigned from Council September 2, 1976.)
Council moves to a 14-ward system, with one Alderman being elected in each ward.
89	1977	October 19	October 31, 1977; October 27, 1980 (2 years, 362 days)	Ross Alger	Ward 1: Marguerite Patricia Shook Donnelly; Ward 2: Maurice Edgar Ryan; Ward 3: Robert Archibald Simpson; Ward 4: Donald Adam Hartman; Ward 5: Stanley Kenneth Nelson; Ward 6: Brian Craig Lee; Ward 7: Elaine Pauline Husband	Ward 8: Barbara Ann Scott; Ward 9: Harold Joseph Huish; Ward 10: Gordon Wells Shrake; Ward 11: Douglas Craig Somers Reid; Ward 12: Naomi Sylvia Shapiro Whalen; Ward 13: Anna Blough; Ward 14: Sue Higgins		
90	1980	October 15	October 27, 1980; October 24, 1983 (2 years, 362 days)	Ralph Klein	Ward 1: Marguerite Patricia Shook Donnelly; Ward 2: Robert Reginald McCombie; Ward 3: Bob Hawkesworth; Ward 4: Donald Adam Hartman; Ward 5: Stanley Kenneth Nelson; Ward 6: Brian Craig Lee; Ward 7: Elaine Pauline Husband	Ward 8: Barbara Ann Scott; Ward 9: John Wilmer Long; Ward 10: Gordon Wells Shrake; Ward 11: Douglas Craig Somers Reid; Ward 12: Lawrence Alexander Gilchrist; Ward 13: James Richard Bell; Ward 14: Sue Higgins		
91	1983	October 17	October 24, 1983; October 27, 1986 (3 years, 3 days)	Ralph Klein	Ward 1: Dale Hodges; Ward 2: Theresa Catherine Baxter; Ward 3: Bob Hawkesworth; Ward 4: Donald Adam Hartman; Ward 5: Leslie Ewen Ernest Pears; Ward 6: John Joseph Leigh; Ward 7: Timothy Walter Bardsley	Ward 8: Barbara Ann Scott; Ward 9: Al Duerr; Ward 10: Raymond William Arthur Clark; Ward 11: Douglas Craig Somers Reid; Ward 12: Lawrence Alexander Gilchrist; Ward 13: James Richard Bell; Ward 14: Verna Diane Scown Hunter		(Note: Bob Hawkesworth would resign May 12, 1986, no by-election was held.)
92	1986	October 20	October 27, 1986; October 23, 1989 (2 years, 361 days)	Ralph Klein	Ward 1: Dale Hodges; Ward 2: Theresa Catherine Baxter; Ward 3: John Schmal; Ward 4: Donald Adam Hartman; Ward 5: Jonathan Niles Havelock; Ward 6: John Joseph Leigh; Ward 7: Timothy Walter Bardsley	Ward 8: Barbara Ann Scott; Ward 9: Al Duerr; Ward 10: Raymond William Arthur Clark; Ward 11: Douglas Craig Somers Reid; Ward 12: Sue Higgins; Ward 13: Anna Blough; Ward 14: Verna Diane Scown Hunter		(Note: Ralph Klein would resign March 21, 1989, and Donald Adam Hartman would be appointed by Council as mayor the same day.)
93	1989	October 16	October 23, 1989; October 26, 1992 (3 years, 3 days)	Al Duerr	Ward 1: Dale Hodges; Ward 2: Sharon Margaret Redman Fisk; Ward 3: John Schmal; Ward 4: Richard Charles Magnus; Ward 5: Yvonne Marie Fagnan Fritz; Ward 6: John Joseph Leigh; Ward 7: Bev Longstaff	Ward 8: Barbara Ann Scott; Ward 9: Richard Gordon Smith; Ward 10: Raymond William Arthur Clark; Ward 11: Douglas Craig Somers Reid; Ward 12: Sue Higgins; Ward 13: William Glen Johnston; Ward 14: Carol Ann Macdonald Kraychy		
94	1992	October 19	October 26, 1992; October 23, 1995 (2 years, 362 days)	Al Duerr	Ward 1: Dale Hodges; Ward 2: Joanne Louise Craig Kerr; Ward 3: John Schmal; Ward 4: Richard Charles Magnus; Ward 5: Yvonne Marie Fagnan Fritz; Ward 6: Dave Bronconnier; Ward 7: Bev Longstaff	Ward 8: Barbara Ann Scott; Ward 9: Richard Gordon Smith; Ward 10: Raymond William Arthur Clark; Ward 11: Barry Erskine; Ward 12: Sue Higgins; Ward 13: William Glen Johnston; Ward 14: Carol Ann Macdonald Kraychy		
95	1995	October 16	October 23, 1995; October 26, 1998 (3 years, 3 days)	Al Duerr	Ward 1: Dale Hodges; Ward 2: Joanne Louise Craig Kerr; Ward 3: John Schmal; Ward 4: Bob Hawkesworth; Ward 5: Ray Jones; Ward 6: Dave Bronconnier; Ward 7: Bev Longstaff	Ward 8: Jon Lord; Ward 9: Joe Ceci; Ward 10: Raymond William Arthur Clark; Ward 11: Barry Erskine; Ward 12: Sue Higgins; Ward 13: Patricia Rosalynn Mogridge Grier; Ward 14: Linda Fox-Mellway		
96	1998	October 19	October 26, 1998; October 22, 2001 (2 years, 361 days)	Al Duerr	Ward 1: Dale Hodges; Ward 2: Joanne Louise Craig Kerr; Ward 3: John Schmal; Ward 4: Bob Hawkesworth; Ward 5: Ray Jones; Ward 6: Dave Bronconnier; Ward 7: Bev Longstaff	Ward 8: Jon Lord; Ward 9: Joe Ceci; Ward 10: Diane Danielson; Ward 11: Barry Erskine; Ward 12: Sue Higgins; Ward 13: Patricia Rosalynn Mogridge Grier; Ward 14: Linda Fox-Mellway		
97	2001	October 15	October 22, 2001; October 25, 2004 (3 years, 3 days)	Dave Bronconnier	Ward 1: Dale Hodges; Ward 2: Gord Lowe; Ward 3: John Schmal; Ward 4: Bob Hawkesworth; Ward 5: Ray Jones; Ward 6: Craig Burrows; Ward 7: Druh Farrell	Ward 8: Madeleine King; Ward 9: Joe Ceci; Ward 10: Diane Danielson; Ward 11: Barry Erskine; Ward 12: Ric McIver; Ward 13: Diane Colley-Urquhart; Ward 14: Linda Fox-Mellway	221,513	
98	2004	October 18	October 25, 2004; October 22, 2007 (2 years, 362 days)	Dave Bronconnier	Ward 1: Dale Hodges; Ward 2: Gord Lowe; Ward 3: Helen Larocque; Ward 4: Bob Hawkesworth; Ward 5: Ray Jones; Ward 6: Craig Burrows; Ward 7: Druh Farrell	Ward 8: Madeleine King; Ward 9: Joe Ceci; Ward 10: Margot Aftergood; Ward 11: Barry Erskine; Ward 12: Ric McIver; Ward 13: Diane Colley-Urquhart; Ward 14: Linda Fox-Mellway	115,549	(Note: Ward 10 Alderman Margot Aftergood resigned November 30, 2004, following allegations of ballot stuffing by her campaign.)
99	2007	October 15	October 22, 2007; October 25, 2010 (3 years, 3 days)	Dave Bronconnier	Ward 1: Dale Hodges; Ward 2: Gord Lowe; Ward 3: Jim Stevenson; Ward 4: Bob Hawkesworth; Ward 5: Ray Jones; Ward 6: Joe Connelly; Ward 7: Druh Farrell	Ward 8: Jon Mar; Ward 9: Joe Ceci; Ward 10: Andre Chabot; Ward 11: Brian Pincott; Ward 12: Ric McIver; Ward 13: Diane Colley-Urquhart; Ward 14: Linda Fox-Mellway	209,748	
100	2010	October 18	October 25, 2010; October 28, 2013 (3 years, 3 days)	Naheed Nenshi	Ward 1: Dale Hodges; Ward 2: Gord Lowe; Ward 3: Jim Stevenson; Ward 4: Gael Macleod; Ward 5: Ray Jones; Ward 6: Richard Pootmans; Ward 7: Druh Farrell	Ward 8: Jon Mar; Ward 9: Gian-Carlo Carra; Ward 10: Andre Chabot; Ward 11: Brian Pincott; Ward 12: Shane Keating; Ward 13: Diane Colley-Urquhart; Ward 14: Peter Demong	354,090	
101	2013	October 21	October 28, 2013; October 23, 2017 (3 years, 360 days)	Naheed Nenshi	Ward 1: Ward Sutherland; Ward 2: Joe Magliocca; Ward 3: Jim Stevenson; Ward 4: Sean Chu; Ward 5: Ray Jones; Ward 6: Richard Pootmans; Ward 7: Druh Farrell	Ward 8: Evan Woolley; Ward 9: Gian-Carlo Carra; Ward 10: Andre Chabot; Ward 11: Brian Pincott; Ward 12: Shane Keating; Ward 13: Diane Colley-Urquhart; Ward 14: Peter Demong	262,577	
The Mayor and Councillors are elected 4 year terms.
102	2017	October 16	October 23, 2017; October 25, 2021 (4 years, 2 days)	Naheed Nenshi	Ward 1: Ward Sutherland; Ward 2: Joe Magliocca; Ward 3: Jyoti Gondek; Ward 4: Sean Chu; Ward 5: George Chahal; Ward 6: Jeff Davison; Ward 7: Druh Farrell	Ward 8: Evan Woolley; Ward 9: Gian-Carlo Carra; Ward 10: Ray Jones; Ward 11: Jeromy Farkas; Ward 12: Shane Keating; Ward 13: Diane Colley-Urquhart; Ward 14: Peter Demong	387,306	
103	2021	October 18	October 25, 2021; October 29, 2025 (4 years, 4 days)	Jyoti Gondek	Ward 1: Sonya Sharp; Ward 2: Jennifer Wyness; Ward 3: Jasmine Mian; Ward 4: Sean Chu; Ward 5: Raj Dhaliwal; Ward 6: Richard Pootmans; Ward 7: Terry Wong	Ward 8: Courtney Walcott; Ward 9: Gian-Carlo Carra; Ward 10: Andre Chabot; Ward 11: Kourtney Branagan; Ward 12: Evan Spencer; Ward 13: Dan McLean; Ward 14: Peter Demong		
Calgary introduces municipal political parties
104	2025	October 20	October 29, 2025; Present (1 year, 20 days)	Jeromy Farkas (IND)	Ward 1: Kim Tyers (CF); Ward 2: Jennifer Wyness (IND); Ward 3: Andrew Yule (IND); Ward 4: DJ Kelly (TCP); Ward 5: Raj Dhaliwal (IND); Ward 6: John Pantazopoulos (IND); Ward 7: Myke Atkinson (IND)	Ward 8: Nathaniel Schmidt (IND); Ward 9: Harrison Clark (IND); Ward 10: Andre Chabot (CF); Ward 11: Rob Ward (CF); Ward 12: Mike Jamieson (ABC); Ward 13: Dan McLean (CF); Ward 14: Landon Johnston (IND)	348,637	

== See also ==
- Calgary City Council
- List of mayors of Calgary
