= 1901 Calgary municipal election =

Election in Alberta, Canada

← 1900	December 9, 1901	1902 →
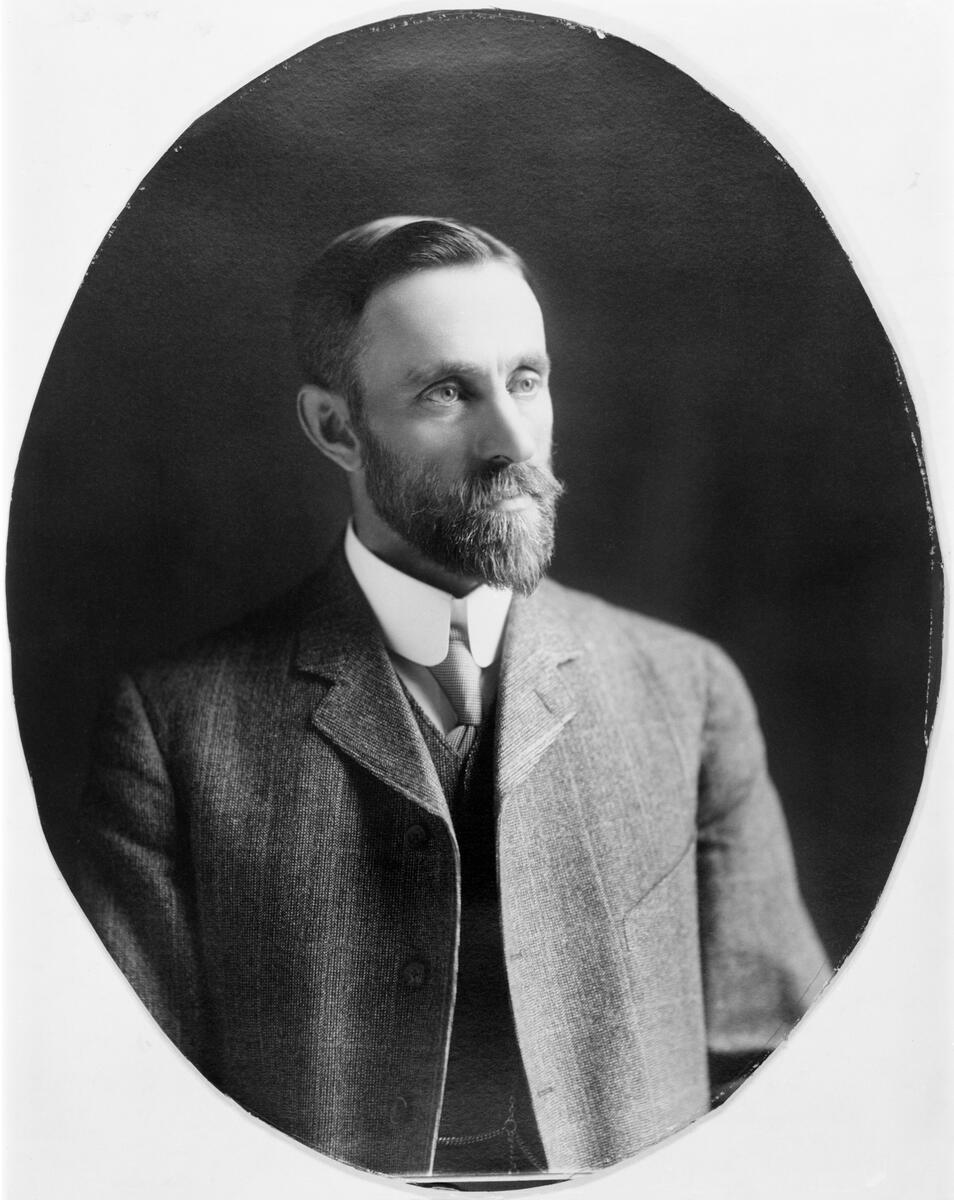
Candidate	Thomas Underwood
Mayor before election
James Stuart Mackie
Elected mayor
Thomas Underwood

The 1901 Calgary municipal election was held on December 9, 1901 to elect a mayor and nine aldermen to sit on the eighteenth Calgary City Council from January 6, 1902 to January 5, 1903.

== Background ==
Voting rights were provided to any male, single woman, or widowed British subject over twenty-one years of age who are assessed on the last revised assessment roll with a minimum property value of $200.

The election was held under multiple non-transferable vote where each elector was able to cast a ballot for the mayor and up to three ballots for separate councillors with a voter's designated ward.

Key issues for the election included the levying of a municipal income tax recently provided by changes to the City Charter. The Calgary Daily Herald speculated that John Emerson's loss of council seat was attributed to the public's association of his name with the income tax, when he merely read the resolution proposed by the City Clerk.

== Results ==
=== Mayor ===
- Thomas Underwood

=== Councillors ===
==== Ward 1 ====
Candidate	Votes	Percent
William Mahon Parslow	151	65.65%
Silas Alexander Ramsay	140	60.87%
Thomas Alexander Hatfield	138	60.00%
Solomon Sheldwyn Spafford	118	51.30%
Total	230	-

==== Ward 2 ====
- John Creighton - Acclaimed
- William Henry Cushing - Acclaimed
- John Jackson Young - Acclaimed

==== Ward 3 ====
Candidate	Votes	Percent
Isacc Stephen Gerow Van Wart	128	56.89%
William Charles Gordon Armstrong	117	52.00%
James Abel Hornby	113	50.22%
John Emerson	94	41.78%
Clarke	35	15.56%
Hooper	29	12.89%
Total	516	-

== September 1902 by-election ==
Following John Creighton's death on July 29, 1902, the City of Calgary scheduled a by-election for the vacant seat in Ward 2 for September 8, 1902, however John Hamilton Kerr would be acclaimed upon the close of nominations on September 1, 1902.

== See also ==
- List of Calgary municipal elections
