= 1897 Calgary municipal election =

Election in Alberta, Canada

- December 13, 1897
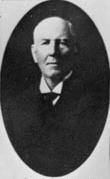
Candidate	Arthur Leslie Cameron
Popular vote	Acclaimed
Mayor before election
Wesley Fletcher Orr
Elected mayor
Arthur Leslie Cameron

The 1897 Calgary municipal election was scheduled for December 13, 1897 to elect a Mayor and nine Councillors to sit on the fourteenth Calgary City Council from January 3, 1898 to January 3, 1899. Arthur Leslie Cameron was acclaimed as mayor.

== Results ==
=== Mayor ===
- Arthur Leslie Cameron — Acclaimed

=== Councillors ===
==== Ward 1 ====
1897 Calgary municipal election: Councillor Ward 1
Party	Candidate	Votes	%	Elected
-	William Hugh Kinnisten	78	30.23%	✓
-	Alexander McBride	67	25.97%	✓
-	Silas Alexander Ramsay	67	25.97%	✓
-	William Pitman	46	17.83%	
Source(s) Election was held under multiple non-transferable vote where each elector was able to cast a ballot for the mayor and up to three ballots for separate councillors.

==== Ward 2 ====
1897 Calgary municipal election: Councillor Ward 2
Party	Candidate	Votes	%	Elected
-	Thomas O'Brien	106	32.52%	✓
-	James Stuart Mackie	77	23.62%	✓
-	Robert John Hutchings	77	23.62%	✓
-	William Henry Cushing	66	20.25%	
Source(s) Election was held under multiple non-transferable vote where each elector was able to cast a ballot for the mayor and up to three ballots for separate councillors.

==== Ward 3 ====
1897 Calgary municipal election: Councillor Ward 3
Party	Candidate	Votes	%	Elected
-	Thomas Underwood	34	36.56%	✓
-	Walter Jarrett	26	27.96%	✓
-	Adam Robson McTavish	25	26.88%	✓
-	Thomas O'Brien	8	8.60%	
Source(s) Election was held under multiple non-transferable vote where each elector was able to cast a ballot for the mayor and up to three ballots for separate councillors.

=== School Trustee ===
Party	Candidate	Votes	%	Elected
Independent	McKenzie	144	40.22%	✓
Independent	Parslow	114	31.84%	✓
Independent	McNeill	100	27.93%	
Total valid votes		358		

== See also ==
- List of Calgary municipal elections

== Sources ==
- Frederick Hunter: THE MAYORS AND COUNCILS OF THE CORPORATION OF CALGARY Archived March 3, 2020
