= 1896 Calgary municipal election =

Election in Alberta, Canada

- December 14, 1896
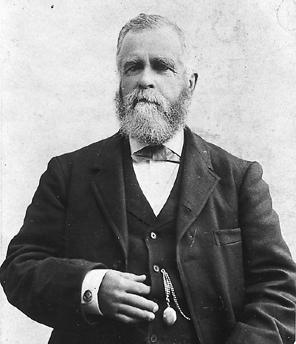
Candidate	Wesley Fletcher Orr
Mayor before election
Alexander McBride
Elected mayor
Wesley Fletcher Orr

The 1896 Calgary municipal election was scheduled for December 14, 1896 to elect a Mayor and nine Councillors to sit on the thirteenth Calgary City Council from January 4, 1897 to January 3, 1898.

The entire council was acclaimed upon the close of nominations on December 7, 1896.

== Background ==
Voting rights were provided to any male, single woman, or widowed British subject over twenty-one years of age who are assessed on the last revised assessment roll with a minimum property value of $200.

The election was held under multiple non-transferable vote where each elector was able to cast a ballot for the mayor and up to three ballots for separate councillors.

== Results ==
=== Mayor ===
- Wesley Fletcher Orr

=== Councillors ===
==== Ward 1 ====
- William Pitman Jr.
- William Mahon Parslow
- Silas Alexander Ramsay

==== Ward 2 ====
- Arthur Leslie Cameron
- Neville James Lindsay
- Henry Brown

==== Ward 3 ====
- Thomas Underwood
- Adam Robson McTavish
- Walter Jarrett

== See also ==
- List of Calgary municipal elections

== Sources ==
- Frederick Hunter: THE MAYORS AND COUNCILS OF THE CORPORATION OF CALGARY Archived March 3, 2020
