= 1905 Calgary municipal election =

Election in Alberta, Canada

← 1904	December 11, 1905	1906 →
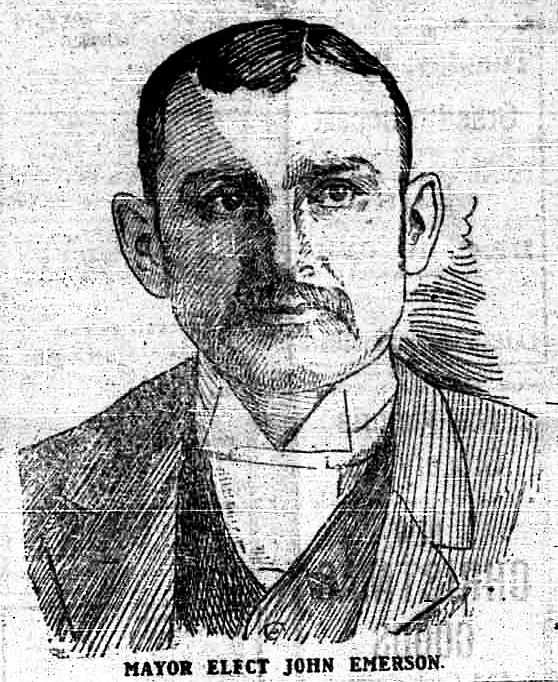
		J.R.T.
Candidate	John Emerson	John Rawlings Thompson
Popular vote	724	532
Percentage	57.64%	42.36%
Mayor before election
John Emerson
Elected mayor
John Emerson

The 1905 Calgary municipal election was held on December 11, 1905 to elect a Mayor and twelve Aldermen to sit on the twenty-second Calgary City Council from January 2, 1906 to January 14, 1907.

Nominations closed on December 4, 1905 with incumbent Mayor John Emerson and Aldermen John Rawlings Thompson nominated for Mayor.

== Background ==
The election was held under multiple non-transferable vote where each elector was able to cast a ballot for the mayor and up to three ballots for separate councillors with a voter's designated ward.

== Results ==
=== Mayor ===
Candidate	Votes	Percent
John Emerson	724	57.64%
John Rawlings Thompson	532	42.36%

=== Councillors ===
==== Ward 1 ====
Candidate	Votes	Percent
Silas Alexander Ramsay	258	
William Pittman	233	
Charles McMillan	225	
Henry Haskins	179	

==== Ward 2 ====
Candidate	Votes	Percent
George Thomas Young	314	
John Smythe Hall	248	
William George Hunt	235	
J.S. Mackie	230	

==== Ward 3 ====
Candidate	Votes	Percent
John William Mitchell	215	
Simon John Clarke	152	
Arthur Garnet Graves	137	
Richard Addison Brocklebank	124	

==== Ward 4 ====
Candidate	Votes	Percent
Robert James Stuart	223	
David Carter	166	
Clifford Teasdale Jones	130	
E. D. Benson	127	
Eneas McCormick	121	
Arthur Hobbs	112	

=== Public School Board ===
Nominations include:

- C.F. Comer
- James Walker
- E.H. Crandell

=== Separate School Board ===
Nominations include:

- Thomas McCaffrey
- E.H. Rouleau
- Rev. A. Lemarchand

== By-elections ==
Ward 4 Alderman David Carter (1863—1906) died on July 1, 1906, John Goodwin Watson was acclaimed as Alderman for Ward 4 on July 23, 1906. His nomination by the Fourth Ward Ratepayers' Association came after a strenuous meeting which almost led to violence.

John Smythe Hall resigned as Alderman for Ward 2 effective November 30, 1906. No by-election was held.

== See also ==
- List of Calgary municipal elections
