= 1895 Calgary municipal election =

Election in Alberta, Canada

- December 9, 1895
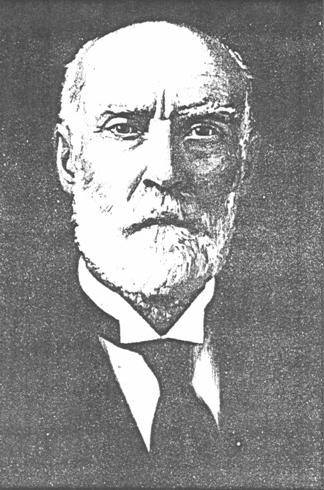
Candidate	Alexander McBride
Mayor before election
Wesley Fletcher Orr
Elected mayor
Alexander McBride

The 1895 Calgary municipal election was scheduled for December 9, 1895 to elect a Mayor and nine Councillors to sit on the twelfth Calgary City Council from January 6, 1896 to January 4, 1897.

== Background ==
Voting rights were provided to any male, single woman, or widowed British subject over twenty-one years of age who are assessed on the last revised assessment roll with a minimum property value of $200.

The election was held under multiple non-transferable vote where each elector was able to cast a ballot for the mayor and up to three ballots for separate councillors.

== Results ==
=== Mayor ===
- Alexander McBride

=== Councillors ===
==== Ward 1 ====
- James Alexander McKenzie
- William Mahon Parslow
- Silas Alexander Ramsay

==== Ward 2 ====
- John Creighton
- James Stuart Mackie
- Henry Brown

==== Ward 3 ====
- William Henry Cushing
- Adam Robson McTavish
- Walter Jarrett

== See also ==
- List of Calgary municipal elections

== Sources ==
- Frederick Hunter: THE MAYORS AND COUNCILS OF THE CORPORATION OF CALGARY Archived March 3, 2020
