= 1906 Calgary municipal election =

Election in Alberta, Canada

- December 10, 1906
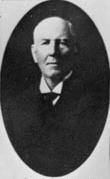
		R.A.B.	R.J.S.
Candidate	Arthur Leslie Cameron	Richard Addison Brocklebank	Robert James Stuart
Popular vote	821	338	297
Percentage	56.39%	23.21%	20.40%
Mayor before election
John Emerson
Elected mayor
Arthur Leslie Cameron

The 1906 Calgary municipal election was held on December 10, 1906 to elect a Mayor and twelve Aldermen to sit on the twenty-third Calgary City Council from January 14, 1907 to January 2, 1908.

Arthur Leslie Cameron was elected Mayor of Calgary for the second time, his first occurring in the 1897 Calgary municipal election.

== Background ==
The election was held under multiple non-transferable vote where each elector was able to cast a ballot for the mayor and up to three ballots for separate councillors with a voter's designated ward.

The requirements for a candidate to be eligible to run for the office of Mayor or Aldermen included being a male or female over the age of 21. Property ownership requirements included owning real property with an assessed value of $200, or tenants of real property with a value of $400, or income in the amount of $400.

All Aldermen candidates for Ward 3 and Ward 4 were acclaimed upon the close of nomination on December 3, 1906.

Richard Addison Brocklebank was convinced to run as a candidate for Mayor in November prior to the election, he did so with the backing of Labour on the condition he would run as an independent. In order to be eligible as a candidate for the Mayoral election, Brocklebank resigned from the License Commission a day prior to the election.

== Results ==
=== Mayor ===
Candidate	Votes	Percent
Arthur Leslie Cameron	821	56.39%
Richard Addison Brocklebank	338	23.21%
Robert James Stuart	297	20.40%

=== Councillors ===
==== Ward 1 ====
Candidate	Votes	Percent
Alfred Moodie	259	
Silas Alexander Ramsay	190	
Robert Suitor	177	
James Abel Hornby	163	
William Pittman	136	
Adoniram Judson Samis	120	
Henry Haskins	57	

==== Ward 2 ====
Candidate	Votes	Percent
William Henry Manarey	352	
Harry William White	302	
George Thomas Young	238	
William George Hunt	186	

==== Ward 3 ====
Candidate	Votes	Percent
John William Mitchell	Acclaimed	
Simon John Clarke	Acclaimed	
Arthur Garnet Graves	Acclaimed	

==== Ward 4 ====
Candidate	Votes	Percent
Charles McMillan	Acclaimed	
John Goodwin Watson	Acclaimed	
Clifford Bernard Reilly	Acclaimed	

=== Public School Board Trustees ===
Candidate	Votes	Percent
Thomas Underwood	616	
A. McTavish	581	
James Short	580	
R.J. Hutchings	191	

=== Separate School Board Trustees ===
- J.J. Chamberlain
- J.R. Miquelon

== See also ==
- List of Calgary municipal elections
