= 1904 Calgary municipal election =

Election in Alberta, Canada

← 1903	December 12, 1904	1905 →
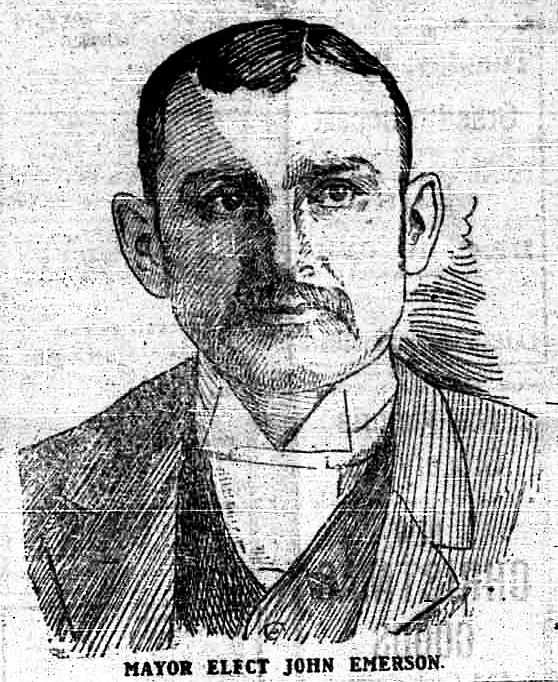

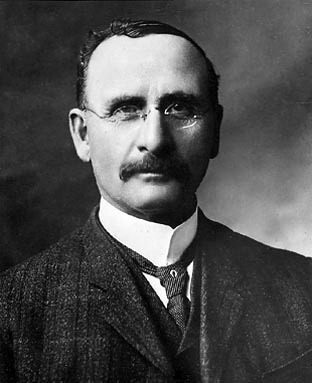

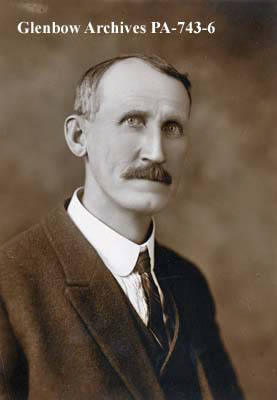
Candidate	John Emerson	William Henry Cushing	James Abel Hornby
Popular vote	398	372	222
Percentage	40.12%	37.50%	22.38%
Mayor before election
Silas Alexander Ramsay
Elected mayor
John Emerson

The 1904 Calgary municipal election was held on December 12, 1904, to elect a Mayor and nine Aldermen to sit on the twenty-first Calgary City Council from January 2, 1905, to January 2, 1906.

Nominations closed on December 5, 1904. Incumbent Mayor Silas Alexander Ramsay did not contest the election and instead contested an Aldermanic position in Ward 1. This resulted in incumbent Ward 1 Aldermen John Emerson defeating his opponents and incumbent Aldermen William Henry Cushing and James Abel Hornby to become the 15th Mayor of Calgary.

== Background ==
The election was held under multiple non-transferable vote where each elector was able to cast a ballot for the mayor and up to three ballots for separate councillors within a voter's designated ward.

== Results ==
=== Mayor ===
Candidate	Votes	Percent
John Emerson	398	40.12%
William Henry Cushing	372	37.50%
James Abel Hornby	222	22.38%

=== Councillors ===
==== Ward 1 ====
Candidate	Votes	Percent
Silas Alexander Ramsay	265	
John Rawlings Thompson	235	
William Leigh Bernard	169	
William Pittman	124	

==== Ward 2 ====
Candidate	Votes	Percent
Charles Allan Stuart	207	
Robert Cadogan Thomas	174	
William Head	170	
Charles McMillan	118	
John Hamilton Kerr	85	
Samuel Bartholomew	51	
W. J. Dunn	32	

=== Public School Board ===
Nominations included:

- Alexander Allan
- Robert John Hutchings
- Arthur Leslie Cameron
- James Short
- Edward Henry Crandell
- Thomas Underwood

==== Ward 3 ====
Candidate	Votes	Percent
Richard Addison Brocklebank	259	
Simon John Clarke	237	
Clifford Teasdale Jones	217	
David Carter	204	

== By-election ==
William Leigh Bernard declined the office of Aldermen and his seat was declared unclaimed on January 2, 1905. James Abel Hornby was elected in by-election as Aldermen for Ward 1 on January 18, 1905.

Candidate	Votes	Percent
James Abel Hornby	161	
William Pittman	159	

== See also ==
- List of Calgary municipal elections
