= 1902 Calgary municipal election =

Election in Alberta, Canada

← 1901	December 8, 1902	1903 →
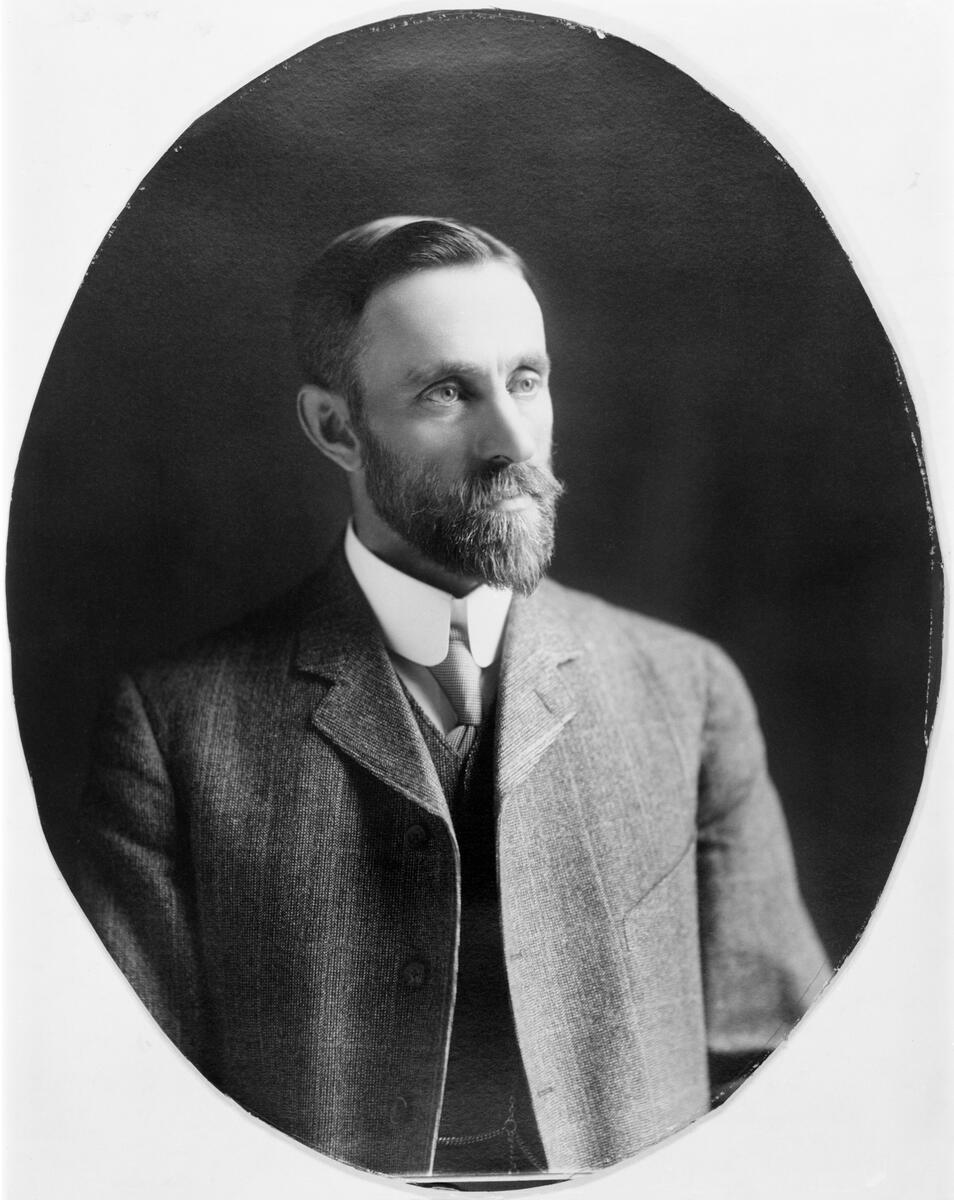
		W. P.
Candidate	Thomas Underwood	William Mahon Parslow
Popular vote	419	270
Percentage	60.81%	39.19%
Mayor before election
Thomas Underwood
Elected mayor
Thomas Underwood

The 1902 Calgary municipal election took place on December 8, 1902 to elect a Mayor and nine Aldermen to sit on the nineteenth Calgary City Council from January 5, 1903 to January 5, 1904.

== Background ==
The position for Mayor was contested by incumbent one-term mayor Thomas Underwood, who also previously served seven terms as Alderman, and five-term Alderman William Mahon Parslow.

The election was held under multiple non-transferable vote where each elector was able to cast a ballot for the mayor and up to three ballots for separate councillors with a voter's designated ward.

Key issues in the election were expansion of the sewer system, public health related to the spread of scarlet fever, municipally owned electric light systems, prohibition, and expanded fire protection.

Richard Addison Brocklebank became the first labour supported candidate to sit on Calgary City Council after he was acclaimed in Ward 3.

== Results ==
=== Mayor ===
Candidate	Votes	Percent
Thomas Underwood	419	60.81%
William Mahon Parslow	270	39.19%
Total	419	-

=== Councillors ===
==== Ward 1 ====
Candidate	Votes	Percent
John Emerson	183	
Silas Alexander Ramsay	182	
Owen Herbert Bott	174	
Mackenzie	154	
Pitman	85	

==== Ward 2 ====
Candidate	Votes	Percent
John Irwin	185	
William Carson	143	
William John Binning	95	
John Hamilton Kerr	80	
Brown	61	

==== Ward 3 ====
- William Charles Gordon Armstrong - Acclaimed
- Richard Addison Brocklebank - Acclaimed
- James Abel Hornby - Acclaimed

=== School Trustees ===
Candidate	Votes	Percent
R. F. Hutchings	408	
A. L. Cameron	364	
Clifford Jones	333	

== September 1902 by-election ==
Following William Carson's decision to decline the office of Alderman for Ward 2 communicated to the City Clerk on December 18, 1902, a by-election was held which was won by William Henry Cushing.

== See also ==
- List of Calgary municipal elections

== Sources ==
- Frederick Hunter: THE MAYORS AND COUNCILS OF THE CORPORATION OF CALGARY Archived March 3, 2020
