= 1903 Calgary municipal election =

Election in Alberta, Canada

← 1902	December 13, 1903	1904 →
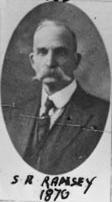
Candidate	Silas Alexander Ramsay
Mayor before election
Thomas Underwood
Elected mayor
Silas Alexander Ramsay

The 1903 Calgary municipal election took place on December 14, 1903 to elect a Mayor and nine Aldermen to sit on the twentieth Calgary City Council from January 5, 1904 to January 2, 1905.

== Background ==
The election was held under multiple non-transferable vote where each elector was able to cast a ballot for the mayor and up to three ballots for separate councillors with a voter's designated ward.

=== 1904 Calgary Land Sales ===
In March 1903, the City of Calgary Council hastily authorized the sale of 500 lots and sold quickly with little advertisement. Many of the high quality properties were purchased by a handful of businessmen, some represented by Alderman J. A. McKenzie. Residents demanded an investigation and on March 26, 1904 Council passed a resolution for Chief Justice Sifton to hold an investigation. Sifton found council had acted with "gross carelessness". Aldermen McKenzie and Macdonald in Ward 1 were found to have invalidated their office by entering into contracts with the city for land, while Aldermen Irwin and Hornby were able to retain their office as they never actually paid for their lots. A by-election was held on April 23, 1904 to replace the two disqualified aldermen.

== Results ==
=== Mayor ===
- Silas Alexander Ramsay - Acclaimed

=== Councillors ===
==== Ward 1 ====
Candidate	Votes	Percent
John Thomas Macdonald	174	
James Alexander McKenzie	152	
John Emerson	117	
Arthur Davies	99	
Owen H. Bott	98	
R. A. Janes	74	
E. Matthews	43	

==== Ward 2 ====
- William Henry Cushing - Acclaimed
- John Irwin - Acclaimed
- John Hamilton Kerr - Acclaimed

==== Ward 3 ====
Candidate	Votes	Percent
James Abel Hornby	188	
Thomas Underwood	165	
Simon John Clarke	140	
William Charles Gordon Armstrong	139	
Richard Addison Brocklebank	109	

== See also ==
- List of Calgary municipal elections

== Sources ==
- Frederick Hunter: THE MAYORS AND COUNCILS OF THE CORPORATION OF CALGARY Archived March 3, 2020
