= 1900 Calgary municipal election =

Election in Alberta, Canada

- December 10, 1900
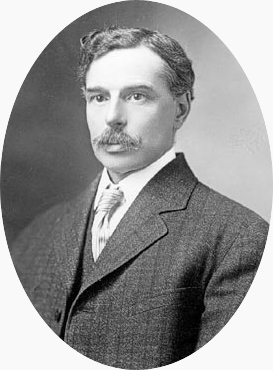

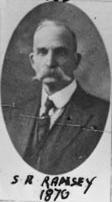
Candidate	James Stuart Mackie	Silas Alexander Ramsay
Popular vote	217	216
Percentage	50.12%	49.88%
Mayor before election
William Henry Cushing
Elected mayor
James Stuart Mackie

The 1900 Calgary municipal election took place on December 10, 1900, to elect a Mayor and nine Aldermen to sit on the seventeenth Calgary City Council from January 7, 1901, to January 6, 1902. The election for Mayor was very close, with the Calgary Herald reporting James Stuart Mackie defeating his opponent Silas Alexander Ramsay by a single vote.

== Results ==
=== Mayor ===
- James Stuart Mackie - 217 votes
- Silas Alexander Ramsay - 216 votes

=== Councillors ===
==== Ward 1 ====
- James Alexander McKenzie - 124 votes
- Solomon Sheldwyn Spafford - 111 votes
- Thomas Alexander Hatfield - 106 votes
- William Pittman Jr. - 65 votes
- Spoiled - 5 votes

==== Ward 2 ====
- John Jackson Young - 163 votes
- Richard Benjamin O'Sullivan - 105 votes
- John Creighton - 86 votes
- Robert Cadogan Thomas - 82 votes
- Spoiled - 1 vote

==== Ward 3 ====
- Thomas Underwood - 91 votes
- John Emerson - 78 votes
- Joseph Edward Eckersley - 74 votes
- William Charles Gordon Armstrong - 65 votes
- Spoiled - 0 votes

=== School trustees ===
- Arthur Leslie Cameron - 232 votes
- Robert John Hutchings - 207 votes
- Richard Benjamin O'Sullivan - 182 votes

== See also ==
- List of Calgary municipal elections

== Sources ==
- Frederick Hunter: THE MAYORS AND COUNCILS OF THE CORPORATION OF CALGARY Archived March 3, 2020
