= 1892 Calgary municipal election =

Election in Alberta, Canada

- January 4, 1892
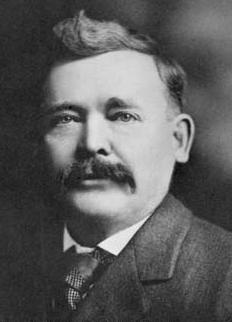
Candidate	Alexander Lucas
Popular vote	Acclaimed
Mayor before election
James Reilly
Elected mayor
Alexander Lucas

The 1892 Calgary municipal election was scheduled for January 4, 1892 to elect a Mayor and six Councillors to sit on the eighth Calgary Town Council from January 18, 1892 to January 16, 1893.

== Results ==
=== Mayor ===
- Alexander Lucas – 210 votes

=== Councillors ===
- George Clift King – 210 votes
- Issac Sanford Freeze – 201 votes
- Wesley Fletcher Orr – 188 votes
- Alexander McBride – 186 votes
- James Reilly – 180 votes
- William Henry Cushing – 171 votes
- Ford – 143 votes
- Muir – 125 votes
- Thomas Underwood – 69 votes
- Parish – 34 votes

== See also ==
- List of Calgary municipal elections

== Sources ==
- Frederick Hunter: THE MAYORS AND COUNCILS OF THE CORPORATION OF CALGARY Archived March 3, 2020
