= 1899 Calgary municipal election =

Election in Alberta, Canada

- December 11, 1899
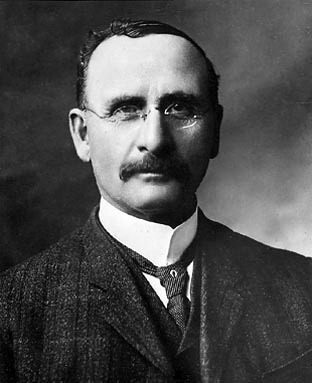

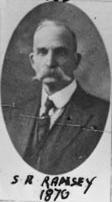
Candidate	William Henry Cushing	Silas Alexander Ramsay
Popular vote	200	175
Percentage	53.33%	46.67%
Mayor before election
James Reilly
Elected mayor
William Henry Cushing

The 1899 Calgary municipal election took place on December 11, 1899 to elect a Mayor to sit on the sixteenth Calgary City Council from January 2, 1900 to January 7, 1901. All Aldermen candidates for council were acclaimed, and there was only a contest for the position of Mayor.

== Results ==
=== Mayor ===
1899 Calgary municipal election: Mayor
Party	Candidate	Votes	%	Elected
-	William Henry Cushing	200	53.33%	✓
-	Silas Alexander Ramsay	175	46.66%	
Total valid votes		375	-	

=== Councillors ===
==== Ward 1 ====
- Thomas Alexander Hatfield
- William Mahon Parslow
- Solomon Sheldwyn Spafford

==== Ward 2 ====
- John Creighton
- James Hedley Grierson
- Hugh Neilson

==== Ward 3 ====
- Donald J. Gunn
- Thomas Underwood
- Isacc Stephen Gerow Van Wart

== See also ==
- List of Calgary municipal elections

== Sources ==
- Frederick Hunter: THE MAYORS AND COUNCILS OF THE CORPORATION OF CALGARY Archived March 3, 2020
