= 1926 Calgary municipal election =

Election in Alberta, Canada

- December 15, 1926
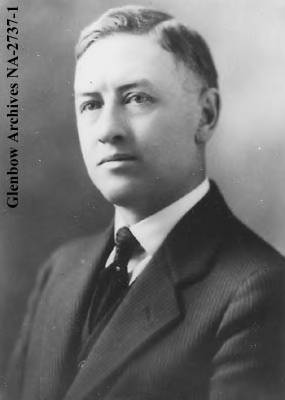

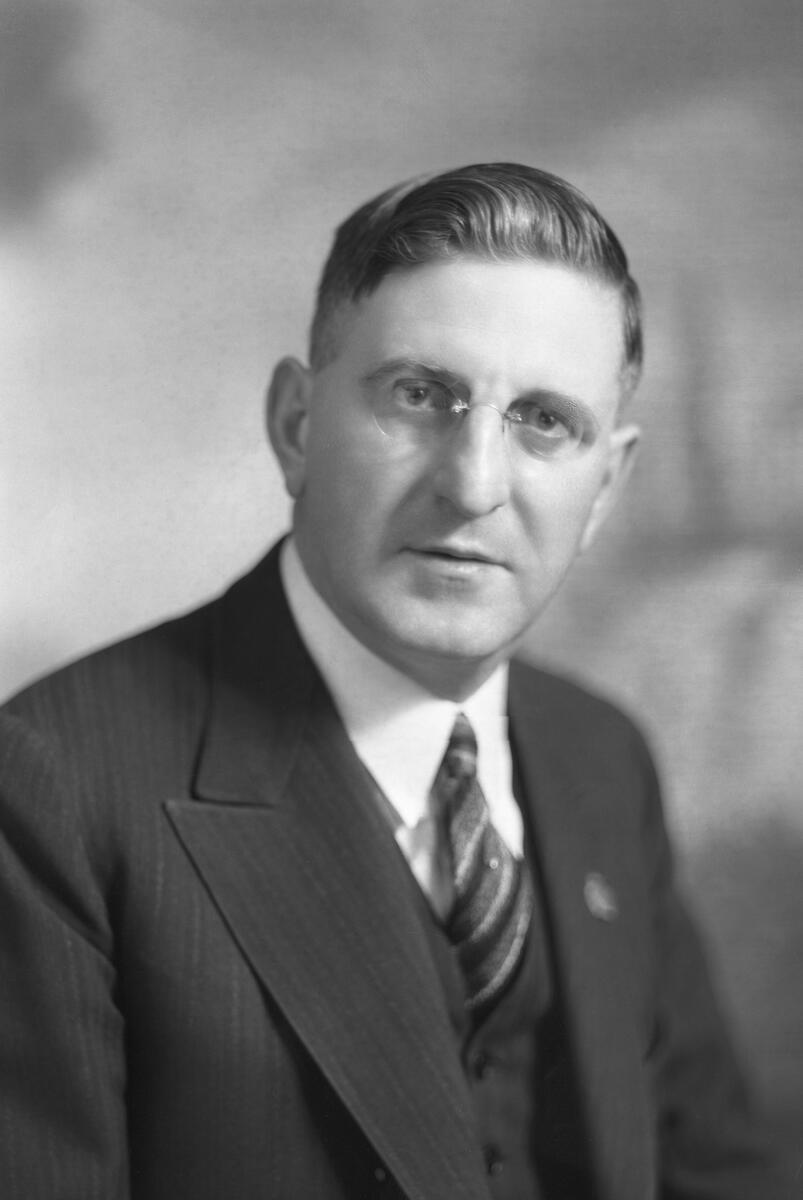
Candidate	Frederick Ernest Osborne	Andrew Davison
Popular vote	5,501	5,280
Percentage	51.02%	48.98%
Mayor before election
George Harry Webster
Elected mayor
Frederick Ernest Osborne
Civic Government Association

The 1926 Calgary municipal election was held on December 15, 1926 to elect a Mayor seven Aldermen to sit on Calgary City Council. Along with positions on Calgary City Council, three trustees for the Public School Board two trustees for the Separate School Board, and a number of plebiscites were held, all requiring a two-thirds majority to pass.

Calgary City Council governed under "Initiative, Referendum and Recall" which is composed of a Mayor, Commissioner and twelve Aldermen all elected to staggered two year terms. Mayor Frederick Ernest Osborne and five Aldermen: Frank Roy Freeze, Robert Cadogan Thomas, Robert H. Parkyn, Thomas Alexander Hornibrook and Sam S. Savage elected in 1925 continued in their positions.

The 1926 election was the second incidence in Calgary history where a woman was elected to Calgary City Council, as Edith Patterson garnered 767 votes. Annie Gale was the first member of Calgary City Council elected in 1917.

== Background ==
The mayor was elected using instant-runoff voting.

The election of city councillors and school board trustees used the Single Transferable Voting form of Proportional Representation (STV-PR) with winners elected for two year terms.

== Results ==
=== Mayor ===
Party	Candidate	Votes	%	Elected
Civic Government Association	Frederick Ernest Osborne	5,501	51.02%	✓
Dominion Labor	Andrew Davison	5,280	48.98%	
Total valid votes		10,781		

=== Council ===
Quota for election was 1,335.

Party	Candidate	Votes	%	Count	Elected
Dominion Labor	John Walker Russell	2,200	20.62%	1st	✓
Civic Government Association	Reuben Weldon Ward	1,834	17.19%	1st	✓
Civic Government Association	Peter Turner Bone	1,375	12.89%	1st	✓
Civic Government Association	Eneas Edward McCormick	1,286	12.05%	2nd	✓
Civic Government Association	Harold Wigmore McGill	1,045	9.79%	6th	✓
Civic Government Association	Frederick Charles Manning	961	9.01%	9th	✓
Dominion Labor	Edith Patterson	767	7.19%	8th	✓
Independent Labor	Andrew Graham Broatch	605	5.67%		
Dominion Labor	A. J. Boulter	289	2.71%		
Dominion Labor	J. E. Worsley	254	2.38%		
Independent Labor	B. Wallace	55	0.52%		
Total valid votes		10,671			

=== Public School Board ===
Quota for election was 2,491.

Party	Candidate	Votes	%	Count	Elected
Dominion Labor	W. E. Turner	2,797	28.08%	1st	✓
Civic Government Association	J. T. Sutherland	2,388	23.97%	2nd	✓
Independent	Mrs. Norman Hindslay	2,231	22.40%	3rd	✓
Civic Government Association	D. S. Moffat	1,828	18.35%	3rd	✓
Independent	M. A. Wright	718	7.21%		
Total valid votes		9,962			

=== Separate School Board ===
Quota for election was 202.

Party	Candidate	Votes	%	Count	Elected
Independent	F. N. Sandgathe	308	50.91%	1st	✓
Independent	Fred Kenny	184	30.41%	2nd	✓
Independent	T. L. Heney	113	18.68%		
Total valid votes		605			

=== Plebiscites ===
==== Industries Assessment ====
City proposes to seek powers to grant reduced assessment from 50 to 25 per cent to new industries or extensions costing at least $25,000.

Industries Assessment	Votes	%
For	3,524	X%
Against	1,310	X%

==== Edmonton Trail Bridge ====
Edmonton Trail Bridge for $23,500. Requires a two-thirds majority.

Edmonton Trail	Votes	%
For	4,105	81.9%
Against	909	18.1%

== See also ==
- List of Calgary municipal elections
