= Demong =

Demong is a surname. Notable people with the surname include:

- Peter Demong, Canadian municipal politician
- Bill Demong (born 1980), American Nordic combined skier
