= 1907 Calgary municipal election =

Election in Alberta, Canada

- December 9, 1907
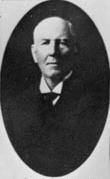

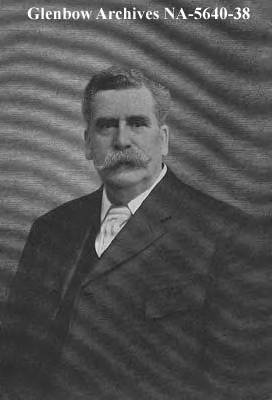
Candidate	Arthur Leslie Cameron	Simon John Clarke
Popular vote	1,120	755
Mayor before election
Arthur Leslie Cameron
Elected mayor
Arthur Leslie Cameron

The 1907 Calgary municipal election was held on December 9, 1907, to elect a Mayor and twelve Aldermen to sit on the twenty-fourth Calgary City Council from January 2, 1908, to January 2, 1909.

== Background ==
The election was held under multiple non-transferable vote where each elector was able to cast a ballot for the mayor and up to three ballots for separate councillors with a voter's designated ward.

The election became a bitter affair with the Calgary Herald supporting Mayor Cameron and the Morning Albertan supporting Alderman Simon John Clarke. The Morning Albertan called Clarke "a man who does things" and claimed the city's financial position would have been better under his stewardship, while criticizing Cameron for closed council meetings and "autocratic rule".

The Morning Albertan charged Mayor Cameron with engineering the bylaw to form a commission in order to provide himself a well paying job. The Morning Albertan claimed the commission bylaw was crafted in a in camera City Council meeting was held to form the commission with three members each paid $2,500: Mayor Cameron, Alderman Harry William White and Alderman Arthur Garnet Graves. The charge was contrasted with the City Council decision to lay off 250 public works employees. Alderman White refuted the charges against Mayor Cameron in the Morning Albertan, going so far as to offer $1,000 if the writer (whom the Morning Albertan acknowledged as publisher William McCartney Davidson) could provide evidence for his claims. Claims also surfaced in the Calgary Herald that as Alderman, Simon John Clarke paved numerous sidewalks throughout the city without authorization or report from City Council or the relevant committees. The Calgary Herald claimed that Clarke and his agents paid for the article in the Morning Albertan, which the Morning Albertan refuted by publishing affidavits of Clarke and his agent J.Y. Byers the next day.

Clarke campaigned on record as alderman including his role as chairman on the Public Works Committee, the election of a commission, municipal meetings open to the public, and financial restraint during difficult times, while Cameron ran on his record extending the waterworks system, improvements to St. George's Island, and missing only one City Council meeting in the previous year.

== Results ==
Election results as reported by the Calgary Herald and Morning Albertan.

=== Mayor ===
Candidate	Votes	Percent
Arthur Leslie Cameron	1,220	
Simon John Clarke	755	

=== Councillors ===
==== Ward 1 ====
Candidate	Votes	Percent
Robert Suitor	480	
Adoniram Judson Samis	407	
Alfred Moodie	361	
Thomas Alfred Presswood Frost	323	
Isaac Gideon Ruttle	306	
T.A. Wiggins	140	
Thomas Hart	109	

==== Ward 2 ====
Candidate	Votes	Percent
Alfred Marmaduke Terrill	550	
William Henry Manarey	441	
George Thomas Callender Robinson	433	
Arthur Bennett	229	
J.R. Hunter	107	

==== Ward 3 ====
Candidate	Votes	Percent
John William Mitchell	348	
James Abel Hornby	338	
Arthur Garnet Graves	320	
A.D. Fidler	208	

==== Ward 4 ====
Candidate	Votes	Percent
John Goodwin Watson	460	
Robert James Stuart	363	
William Mahon Parslow	309	
Marwood	243	
Clifford Bernard Reilly	227	
W.H. Lee	223	

== See also ==
- List of Calgary municipal elections
