= 1925 Calgary municipal election =

Election in Alberta, Canada

- December 16, 1925
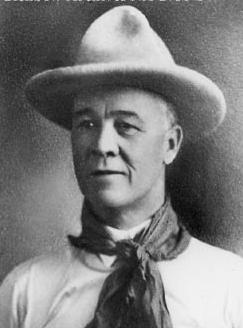
Candidate	George Harry Webster
Popular vote	Acclaimed
Mayor before election
George Harry Webster
Elected mayor
George Harry Webster

The 1925 Calgary municipal election was held on December 16, 1925 to elect a Mayor and seven Aldermen to sit on Calgary City Council. Along with positions on Calgary City Council, five trustees on the public school board and three trustees on the separate school board were elected.

Mayor George Harry Webster won by acclamation, following the close of nominations when his was the only one. The three candidates for the separate school board P. V. Burgard, John Burns and A. J. MacMillan were also acclaimed.

Calgary City Council was governed under "Initiative, Referendum and Recall." Council was composed of a Mayor and a Commissioner, elected to two year terms, and twelve Aldermen, elected to staggered two year terms using single transferable voting. Five aldermen - Frederick Johnston, Frederick Ernest Osborne, Fred J. White, Neil I. McDermid, and John Walker Russell- were elected in 1924 and were set to continue in their positions until December 1926.

Several plebiscites were held. Each required a two-thirds majority for the measure to pass.

In the event Selwood sat as school board trustee for just three months - he was recalled by voters, and lost the subsequent by-election March 31, 2026.

In 1925 Davison was elected to a two year term on the city council but resigned in December 1926 to run - unsuccessfully - for mayor.

== Background ==
The mayor normally was elected using instant-runoff voting. But in this election the seat was filled by acclamation without any voting.

The election of city councillors and school board trustees used the Single Transferable Voting form of Proportional Representation (STV-PR) with six winners elected for two year terms, and one for just one year to finish the two-year term of Thomas Henry Crawford who died in November 1925.

== Spoiled votes ==
About 2.3 percent of votes cast were spoiled. This compares well with the last Calgary city election in which plurality block voting was used, previous to the adoption of proportional representation. In that election (1916), seven percent of votes cast were spoiled.

== Results ==
=== Council ===
Quota for election was 1,277.

Party	Candidate	Votes in first round	%	Count when elected	Elected
Dominion Labor Party	Andrew Davison	2,007	19.57%	1st	✓
Dominion Labor Party	Frank Roy Freeze	1,944	18.95%	1st	✓
Civic Government Association	Robert Cadogan Thomas	1,591	15.51%	1st	✓
Dominion Labor	Robert H. Parkyn	1,104	10.76%	2nd	✓
Civic Government Association	Thomas Alexander Hornibrook	1,084	10.57%	3rd	✓
Civic Government Association	Sam S. Savage	713	6.95%	8th	✓
Civic Government Association	Harry W. Ross	688	6.71%	8th	✓
Dominion Labor Party	Thos. Vickers	484	4.72%		
Dominion Labor Party	D. McPherson	338	3.29%		
Independent	George D. Batchelor	305	2.97%		
Total valid votes		10,258			

=== Public School Board ===
Five were elected this year. Total valid votes 9663. Quota for election was 1,608.

Party	Candidate	Votes in first round	%	Round in which elected	Elected
Civic Government Association	Fred S. Selwood*	2,379	25%	1st	✓
Civic Government Association	A. B. Singleton	1,708	18%	1st	✓
Dominion Labor Party	Thos. B. Riley	1,528	16%	3rd	✓
Civic Government Association	A. C. Newcomb	1,256	13%	2nd	✓
Independent	Dr. Evelyn (Windsor) Leacock	1,181	12%	4th	✓
Dominion Labor Party	Amelia Turner	969	10%		
Dominion Labor Party	W. Ewart Turner	642	7%		
Total valid votes		9,663			

Civic Government Association elected 3 trustees; DLP elected one. One Independent was elected. Initial votes were cast in these proportions: 56 percent for CGA; 32 for DLP; 12 percent for the Independent candidate.

Elections, eliminations and vote transfers Selwood and Singleton were elected in first round of counting.

In the 2nd round of counting, Selwood's surplus votes were transferred mostly to Newcombe who achieved quota and was declared elected. Riley received some votes but came up just one vote shy of the quota.

In the 3rd round of counting, W. Ewart Turner was eliminated. His votes transfer gave Riley a quota of votes and ensured his election. At that point, Leacock had 1416 votes, and Amelia Turner had 1315 votes. Leacock had received enough vote transfers from elected CGA candidates and perhaps from W. Ewart Turner for her vote tally to stay ahead of Amelia Turner's.

In the 4th round of counting, Singleton's surplus was transferred. Leacock received quota and was declared elected. She was the first Independent to sit on school board since 1923. All five leaders in the first count were elected in the end.

Footnote: Selwood was recalled by a citizen initiative in March 1926 and lost the subsequent by-election held March 31, 2026 to Amelia Turner, his lone opponent.

School board chair Silvester, who had been elected in 1924, was also recalled and also was defeated in another by-election that same day, March 31, 1926. He lost to W. Ewart Turner, his lone opponent.

=== Plebiscites ===
==== Bridge Bylaw ====
Bridge bylaw for an expenditure of $22,000 to replace Nose Creek Bridge. Required a two-thirds majority to pass. - Defeated

Bridge Bylaw	Votes	%
Yes	2,831	59.64%
No	1,916	40.36%

==== School Clinic ====
School Clinic Vote. Required a simple majority to pass - Carried

School Clinic	Votes	%
Yes	5,043	55.74%
No	4,004	44.26%

== See also ==
- List of Calgary municipal elections
