= Donald Adam Hartman =

Canadian politician (1929–1996)

33rd Mayor of Calgary
- In office March 21, 1989 – October 23, 1989
- Preceded by: Ralph Klein
- Succeeded by: Al Duerr

Personal details
- Born: August 3, 1929 Calgary, Alberta
- Died: July 5, 1996 (aged 66) Calgary, Alberta

Donald Adam Hartman (August 3, 1929 – July 5, 1996) was the 33rd mayor of Calgary from March 21, 1989, to October 23, 1989. He had been a city Alderman since October 22, 1969. As senior Alderman Hartman was appointed Mayor following Ralph Klein's resignation, serving only until the regular city elections that October. He died of cancer in 1996.

Government offices
Preceded by Ralph Klein	Mayor of Calgary; 1989	Succeeded by Al Duerr
