= James David Macdonald (politician) =

Canadian politician (1922–1995)

James David Macdonald (March 15, 1922 – August 20, 1995) was a Canadian politician and lawyer from Alberta. He served as an Alderman on Calgary City Council from October 24, 1955 to October 22, 1959.

== Political career ==
Macdonald ran as a candidate in the 1959 Alberta general election. He ran for the Progressive Conservatives in the electoral district of Calgary North. Macdonald was in a tough race version three MLAs. He finished second in the race taking 26% of the popular vote.

== Personal life and death ==
Macdonald moved himself and his family to Grand Cayman, becoming the first qualified lawyer to live on the island. He wrote the Companies Law to make Grand Cayman a tax haven. He died on August 20, 1995, at the age of 73.
