= Ernest Starr =

Ernest Henry Starr (1890 – November 10, 1981) was a municipal level politician from Alberta, Canada.

== Early life ==
Starr was born in Caerphilly, Wales. He served with the Imperial Army, Medical Corps during World War I (1914–1918) in Egypt, Salonika and the Dardanelles. After the war he became a member of the Royal Canadian Legion (Alberta No.1) Branch.

Starr arrived in Calgary, Alberta in 1920. He founded and for many years operated Starr's Ambulance Service.

Ernest attempted provincial politics in 1934, running as a Progressive Labour Party of Alberta candidate in a January 15, 1934 by-election in the Calgary electoral district. He finished last in the first count. Under the STV rules in effect at the time, he was eliminated on the second count. He lost his nomination deposit.

== Municipal political career ==
Ernest began a long career on Calgary City Council in 1940, when he was elected as a city Alderman for the first time. He served a total of twenty-one years between four broken periods from 1941 to 1966. After his career at city hall he served as a political advisor for alderman Sue Higgins.

== Second try at provincial seat ==
Ernest made one more attempt at running for provincial politics, running for the Conservatives in Calgary South East electoral district, in the 1963 provincial election. He finished second to Arthur J. Dixon the Speaker of the Alberta Legislative Assembly.

== Other public involvements ==
Starr was active in the community. He sat on the Calgary Board of Education, was a member of the Lions Club of Calgary and a Serving Brother of the Order of St. John of Jerusalem.

He later moved to Vancouver, British Columbia where he died at the age of 91.

== Legacy ==
The Ernie Starr hockey arena in Calgary, located in the community of Forest Lawn, was named in his honor.
