= Mark Tennant =

Canadian politician (1913–1997)

- Born: June 27, 1913; Winnipeg, Manitoba
- Died: December 29, 1997 (aged 84) image= Calgary, Alberta
- Military career
- Allegiance: Canada
- Branch: Canadian Army
- Service years: 1939–1962
- Rank: Lieutenant Colonel
- Nickname: The Green Hornet
- Unit: The Calgary Highlanders
- Conflicts: World War II; Battle of Normandy; Battle of the Scheldt
- Awards: Member of the Order of Canada; CVSM; Wound Stripe
- Other work: City of Calgary Alderman

Lieutenant Colonel Mark Tennant, CM, ED, CD (June 27, 1913 – December 29, 1997) was an alderman of the City of Calgary, an inductee of the Order of Canada, and a long-serving member of Calgary's military community.

He served on the Calgary city council from 1958 to 1961 and 1963 to 1968.

== Early life ==
Mark Tennant was born in Winnipeg, Manitoba. He was educated at St. Rose du Lac and later moved to Alberta. In 1925, Tennant joined the Royal Canadian Army Cadets, and later joined the Militia, enlisting in the South Alberta Regiment.

== War service ==
Tennant enlisted in the Canadian Active Service Force on August 27, 1939, when Militia units across the country were placed on active service. Receiving regimental number M7, he became a Gunner in the 20th Anti-Aircraft Battery, Royal Canadian Artillery. He soon transferred to The Calgary Highlanders with the rank of Private.

Tennant was appointed quickly to the position of Platoon Sergeant Major, and then commissioned. He earned the nickname "The Green Hornet", after the comic book and radio serial character of the same name, because he "always knew what the bad guys were doing" during his turn as orderly officer. He was a captain by the summer of 1942, and commanded Support Company in Normandy. Promoted major in August 1944, he was severely wounded at Hoogerheide in October, but returned to the battalion in 1945 to see the end of the war.

== Post war ==
After the war Tennant served as the Training Officer of the Calgary Highlanders, now a Militia unit again, and in 1948, he became Second in Command of the Regiment. In June 1950, Tennant married Joyce Jalland, a marriage that endured until Tennant's death. He commanded the Highlanders from 1953 to 1956, retiring from the military in 1962.

In civil life, Tennant founded the North Hill Auto Body Works.

In 1958, he was elected alderman for the City of Calgary, a post he held for eight years all in all. After being elected in 1967, he left office halfway through his two-year term. Lorne Ander was elected in 1968 to finish Tennant's term.

On July 13, 1977, he was appointed Honorary Lieutenant Colonel of The Calgary Highlanders, remaining in that position into 1981.

== Honours and awards ==
In June 1981 was made a Member of the Order of Canada. He had never been decorated for bravery during the Second World War, but did receive three Mentions in Despatches.

His Order of Canada citation reads:

For many years of service to his community, not only as Honorary Lieutenant-Colonel of the Calgary Highlanders but as alderman and active member of the boards of many organizations including the Canadian Institute for the Blind, the Hospital Board, the City Transportation Commission and the Calgary Centennial Committee.

On the fiftieth anniversary of Holland's liberation in May 1995, the City of Doetinchem named a park "Mark Tennant Plantsoen - A Canadian Liberator".

Mark Tennant was buried with full military honours in 1997; his casket was draped with the Union Jack in honour of his request, rather than the national (maple leaf) flag.
