= Linda Fox-Mellway =

Canadian politician

City of Calgary Alderman
- In office 1995–2010
- Succeeded by: Peter Demong
- Constituency: Ward 14

Linda Fox-Mellway is a municipal politician from Alberta, Canada. She served as Alderman for ward 14 of Calgary City Council from 1995. On October 18, 2010, Fox-Mellway was voted out of office. Her term ended on October 25, 2010.

== Political career ==
=== Early career ===
Fox-Mellway ran for a seat to Calgary City Council in the 1995 Calgary municipal election.

=== Fifth term ===
The 2007 Calgary municipal election saw her returned to her fifth term in office by acclamation.

Linda Fox-Mellway has lived in the Ward in which she serves for over 20 years and has been active in both personal and public service for most of that time. Examples of her community involvement include - President, Lake Bonavista Community Association - Director, Lake Bonavista Community Association - Chairman, Community Youth Crime Prevention Committee - creation and development involving: Police Services, Block Watch, Board of Education - Vice-Chairman Subdivision & Development Appeal Board, City of Calgary - Board member, Focus Group to study land use, planning and transportation, South of Fish Creek Park - Fund-raising Coordinator, Canadian Cancer Society - Fund-raising Coordinator, Kidney Foundation of Canada.

Council initiatives and resolutions instigated or lobbied for by Fox-Mellway: The Green Trip Initiative - Provincial funding for regional mass transportation to offer viable alternatives to single vehicles LRT from Anderson to Somerset including interchanges at Anderson/MacLeod Trail and Midlake/MacLeod Trail. Widening of MacLeod Trail including the bridge over Fish Creek. Calgary’s first Safety Audit of Highway 22x resulted in many improvements such as the road widening including the bridge. Road widening of 37th Street (Anderson Rd. to 146 Ave), which was paid for by developers as a result of a building freeze she championed through Council. Linda negotiated the construction of 2 sports fields, to be paid for by the developers, and not the City. This is an estimated $15 million savings for the taxpayers. Tanbridge Education and Sports facility. This $60 million facility is completely paid for by the private sector and will be available for public use off school hours. Initial development and expansion of South Fish Creek Recreational Facility. TRICO Centre for Family Wellness expansion. This facility is now a model for successful collaboration between the public and private sectors. Council approval of a new Regional Recreational facility in S.E. Calgary. Fox-Mellway worked with BP Forest in Fish Creek Park, resulting in their developing and entirely funding this environmental space. Initiated the development and opened the first Emergency joint-use facility in Midnapore. Supported adding over 500 police officers, over a 10-year period, to manage growth and public safety. Established a Corridor Study for the safe movement of wildlife from Fish Creek Provincial Park. Represented Council on the Steering Committee for the new Pine Creek Wastewater/Research Centre, an environmental and architectural accomplishment that has received recognition and awards worldwide.

Fox-Mellway voted to support a property tax hike in 2008 that saw the property tax rate in Calgary increase 5.3%. This was much lower than the 9.6% increase council had originally considered.

In early 2009, Fox-Mellway was cited as one of the worst performing Alderman on City Council, she was one of two Alderman given an "F" Grade, the worst possible on an assessment conducted by the Coalition for Property Tax Fairness. The only Alderman to score lower on the assessment was Druh Farrell. However, the Coalition for Property Tax Fairness's report card was based on entirely subjective criteria, and has been widely discredited.

Later that year city Alderman were audited with regard to personal expenses. Fox-Mellway was cited as billing tax payers almost $350 to send her kids to a Metallica concert. Fox-Mellway had used the wrong credit card, and the mistake had been corrected prior to the audit.

In May 2010, Fox-Mellway worked with the Seton Community Association to place a $70 million recreation facility in that community. This caused some debate in the council as the South East Calgary Recreation Society was mandated by city the council to gather public input on the matter. After weighing all the options in the public interest, the council voted in favour of Fox-Mellway's proposal by a count of 11 to 4.

Fox-Mellway has been actively discouraging the use of pesticides. She moved a number of motions relating to a pesticide ban and flip flopped by voting against all her motions all but one of which was carried. She is also against continuing operations at Race City Speedway, as she voted against extending the lease of the popular race-car track.

==== Ratings during fifth term ====
In May 2009, a panel of journalists reviewed City of Calgary aldermen in the Calgary Sun, rating Fox-Mellway a D− (on a standard scholastic scale of A, B, C, D and F.) Mellway was one of five council members that Sun readers wanted to fire immediately, based on the results of the poll.

Fox-Mellway was given an "F" rating by the Coalition for Property Tax Fairness which in June 2009 released its first Calgary Municipal Report Card based on four criteria: Taxpayer-friendly voting record, office budget management, initiative in policy making, and proactive stakeholder engagement and responsiveness.

On October 18, 2010, Fox-Mellway lost her seat in the 2010 Calgary civic election.

=== Awards ===
Fox-Mellway was awarded the Governor General's Commemorative Medal and the Alberta Centennial Silver Medal in recognition of her significant volunteer contributions, and an Outstanding Service Award from the Calgary Public Library for her extraordinary efforts.
