= James P. Gourley =

American politician

Member of the Pennsylvania House of Representatives from the 25th district
- In office 1909–1910

Personal details
- Party: Republican
- Profession: Politician, lawyer

James P. Gourley was an American politician. He was a Republican who served in the Pennsylvania House of Representatives for the 25th District of Philadelphia from 1909 to 1910. He was born in Philadelphia and educated in St. Michael's Parochial School; studied law and was admitted to the bar. Elected to the House of Representatives in November 1908.
