= Peter Petrasuk =

Alderman on Calgary City Council
- In office 1968–1974

Personal details
- Born: July 12, 1926 Ukraine
- Died: April 11, 2016 (aged 89)
- Occupation: politician, lawyer

Peter Petrasuk (July 12, 1926 – April 11, 2016) was a Canadian businessman, former lawyer, and former politician. Petrasuk changed his name to Peter Peterson following his criminal conviction.

== Early life ==
Born in Ukraine in 1926, Petrasuk came to Canada when his family immigrated in 1931. The family settled at first in Calgary, Alberta, but moved in 1941 to Rosebud, Alberta, where they operated a local hotel.

Petrasuk graduated from the University of Alberta with a Bachelor of Science in engineering before being hired by the city of Maracaibo, Venezuela as the head of planning, development, and management of the city's utility system. He later returned to Canada and graduated from the University of British Columbia with a law degree in 1958. Petrasuk articled for Merv Leitch and was admitted to the Bar in Alberta on June 16, 1959. He moved to Calgary and in 1966 was elected to Calgary City Council, remaining there until 1974. Petrasuk unsuccessfully contested the office of Mayor of Calgary in 1974, 1977 and 1980. Petrasuk also contested the 1968 Canadian federal election as a Liberal candidate in Calgary North.

== Disbarment ==
In 1981, Petrasuk pleaded guilty to twelve counts of theft and breach of trust under the Criminal Code after stealing almost $1-million from clients of his law practice, including his own mother. He was sentenced to ten years in the Bowden Institution, a federal penitentiary in central Alberta. Petrasuk was paroled in 1987, but had his parole revoked in 1990 due to helping two inmates who escaped from Drumheller prison. Compensation claims related to Petrasuk's actions depleted the Law Society of Alberta's assurance fund and totaled $3.9-million, requiring lawyers in the province to pay $1,000 each to top up the fund. Petrasuk was disbarred on February 6, 1982.

Petrasuk died on April 11, 2016.
