= Tim Bardsley =

Canadian lawyer and politician

Timothy Walter Bardsley is a Canadian lawyer and politician. He graduated from the University of Toronto in 1976 with a B.A with honours. He studied law at Dalhousie University and graduated from there in 1979. One year later he moved to Calgary, Alberta, and in 1983 he was elected to city council in Ward 7, where he served for six years while continuing to work as a lawyer. In 1989 he ran unsuccessfully for the Alberta legislature as a Liberal candidate in the electoral district of Calgary-Bow. He worked for Brownlee LLP in Calgary until 2007, and later for Fraser Milner Casgrain LLP in Calgary and thereafter Dentons.

Political offices
Preceded by Elaine Husband	Calgary Alderman Ward 7; 1983-1989	Succeeded by Beverly Diane Parken Longstaff

== See also ==
https://web.archive.org/web/20070927221722/http://www.calgary.ca/DocGallery/BU/cityclerks/caldermen.pdf -Calgary Politicians

https://web.archive.org/web/20070930141656/http://www.brownleelaw.com/lawyers/lawyer.php?s=ad&city=Calgary&l_id=104 -Bardsley's profile at Brownlee

http://www.dentons.com/en/tim-bardsley -Bardsley's profile at Dentons
