= Peter Demong =

Canadian municipal politician

City of Calgary Councillor
- In office October 18, 2010 – October 29, 2025
- Preceded by: Linda Fox-Mellway
- Succeeded by: Landon Johnston
- Constituency: Ward 14

Personal details
- Spouse: Naomi
- Education: Southern Alberta Institute of Technology
- Website: http://www.calgary.ca/councillors/ward-14/Pages/Ward-14.aspx

Peter Demong is a municipal politician who served as Councillor of Ward 14 in Calgary, Alberta. He was first elected in 2010.

== Career before politics ==
Prior to being elected in 2010, Demong was a logistics manager at Nose Creek Forest Products. With his wife Naomi, Demong owned and operated Deer Valley Florist from 1996 to 2015.

== Electoral record ==
=== 2010 municipal election ===
Demong was first elected to serve Ward 14 in the 2010 election, taking 29% of the votes while defeating incumbent Linda Fox-Mellway. witnesses removing a conservative challenger’s lawn sign.

=== 2013 municipal election ===
Demong was reelected in the 2013 election by capturing 67% of the votes.
