= John Smythe Hall =

Canadian lawyer, politician, and editor

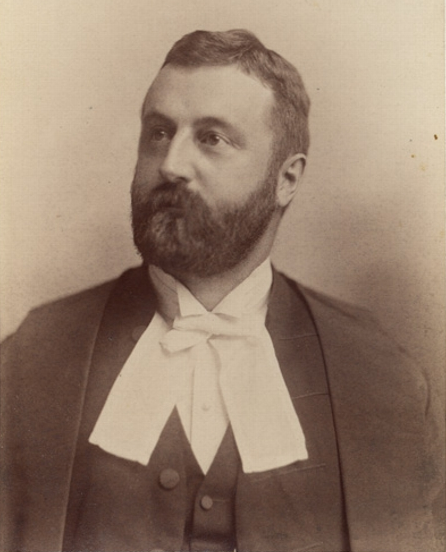
- John Smythe Hall, c.1900

Member of the Legislative Assembly of Quebec for Montréal-Ouest
- In office 1886–1890
- Preceded by: James McShane
- Succeeded by: None, district abolished

Member of the Legislative Assembly of Quebec for Montréal division no. 5
- In office 1890–1897
- Preceded by: None, district created
- Succeeded by: Robert Bickerdike

Personal details
- Born: August 7, 1853 Montreal, Canada East
- Died: January 8, 1909 (aged 55) Calgary, Alberta
- Party: Conservative

John Smythe Hall (August 7, 1853 – January 8, 1909) was a Canadian lawyer, politician, and editor.

Born in Montreal, the son of John Smythe Hall, a lumber merchant, and Emma Brigham, he attended Bishop's College School in Lennoxville, Quebec and received a Bachelor of Law degree from McGill University in 1875. He was called to the Quebec Bar in 1876 and then started a law career which would see him become a principal partner of the law firm Hall, Cross, Brown, and Sharp.

He was first elected to the Legislative Assembly of Quebec in the 1886 election for the riding of Montréal-Ouest. A Conservative, he was acclaimed in the 1890 election in the riding of Montréal division no. 5 and was re-elected in the 1892 election. He was defeated in the 1897 election. In 1891, he was appointed provincial treasurer in the cabinet of Charles-Eugène Boucher de Boucherville and served in the cabinet of Louis-Olivier Taillon.

After being ill and spending time to recover in Atlantic City, New Jersey and Denver, Colorado, Hall moved to Calgary, Alberta where he became editor-in-chief of the Calgary Herald. He also opened a law firm, called Hall and Stewart. He became a member of the Calgary Municipal Council and a city solicitor. He died in Calgary in 1909 and was buried in Montreal.

== See also ==
- List of Bishop's College School alumni
