= Frederick Ernest Osborne =

Canadian politician

Frederick Ernest Osborne CBE
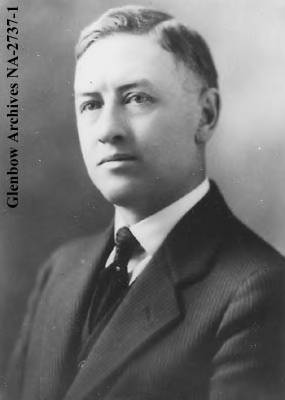

23rd Mayor of Calgary
- In office January 3, 1927 – December 31, 1929
- Preceded by: George Harry Webster
- Succeeded by: Andrew Davison

Alderman of the City of Calgary
- In office January 2, 1923 – January 3, 1925
- In office January 2, 1919 – January 3, 1921

Personal details
- Born: January 20, 1878 Belleville, Ontario
- Died: October 22, 1948 (aged 70) Calgary, Alberta
- Spouse: Florence Curlette
- Occupation: Businessman

Frederick Ernest Osborne CBE (January 20, 1878 – October 22, 1948) was a Canadian politician and businessman.

== Life and career ==
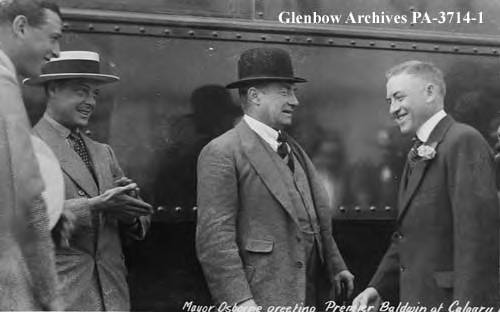
Mayor Fred Osborne greets Prime Minister of the United Kingdom Stanley Baldwin and Edward VIII Prince of Wales

Frederick Ernest Osborne was born on January 10, 1879, in Belleville, Ontario to Richard Osborne (English) and Sarah Anne (née Vickers). He was educated in Belleville and attended Ontario Business College. Osborne married Florence Curlette, of Belleville, Ontario, on September 21, 1901.

In 1905, Osborne came to Calgary and founded Osborne's Book Store, a retail outlet that sold books, stationery, and school supplies. Osborne's Book Store remained in its original location, 112 8 Avenue SW, until it was destroyed by fire in 1966.

Osborne was actively involved in Calgary politics. He was a city alderman twice, and was elected the 1926 Calgary municipal election the twenty-third mayor of Calgary and served from 1927 to 1929. As Alderman he was dissatisfied with the way sinking fund loans were handled by the city, and headed a special sinking fund committee which recommended the appointment of a board of sinking fund trustees to supervise financing. Osborne would sit on the sinking fund board until his death.

Osborne also held leadership roles at many of Calgary's business, service, and social organizations. He was president and district governor of the Calgary Rotary Club from 1921 to 1922, president of the Calgary Board of Trade in 1925, and a member of the board of governors of the University of Alberta from 1923 to 1942. Osborne was a Mason and a Shriner, and a member of the Ranchman's Club, the Calgary Golf and Country Club, and the Glencoe Club.

Frederick Ernest Osborne died in Calgary on October 22, 1948.

== Awards ==
The University of Alberta awarded Osborne an honorary degree of Doctor of Law in 1947.

Osborne was awarded the prestigious Commander of the Order of the British Empire in 1948 for his leadership role on the Provincial War Finance Committee from 1942 to 1945, a few months before his death. It was noted that the Alberta committee's quota for Victory Loans under Osborne's leadership was consistently oversubscribed.

== Legacy ==
The F. E. Osborne Junior High School is named after Osborne.

Preceded by George Harry Webster	Mayor of Calgary; 1927–1929	Succeeded by Andrew Davison
