= Robert Parkyn =

Canadian politician (1862–1939)

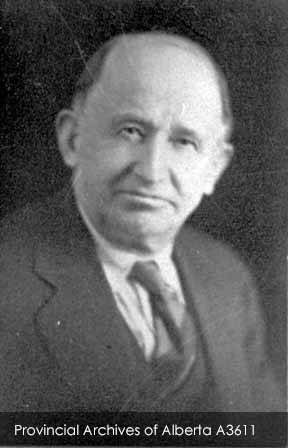
- Robert Parkyn 1933 campaign flyer

MLA for Calgary
- In office 1926–1930
- Preceded by: Alex Ross; Robert Marshall; Robert Pearson; William Davidson
- Succeeded by: Harold McGill; John Bowlen; Hugh Farthing

Personal details
- Born: November 19, 1862 Cornwall, England, United Kingdom
- Died: June 13, 1939 (aged 76) Calgary, Alberta, Canada
- Party: Independent Labour

Robert Henry Parkyn (November 19, 1862 – June 13, 1939) was a municipal and provincial level politician and tradesman in Calgary, Alberta, Canada.

== Early life ==
Parkyn was born in Cornwall, United Kingdom on November 19, 1862 to William and Annie Parkyn.

He was educated in public schools in Cornwall. Later, he apprenticed as a Carpenter and Joiner, and joined the United Brotherhood of Carpenters and Joiners of England.

Robert married Matilda Edwards of Newport, Monmouthshire, Wales in 1895, and had seven male children. The family moved to Calgary in 1910.

== Municipal career ==
Robert Parkyn was elected to Calgary City Council as an Alderman on the Labor ticket for the first time on January 2, 1922 and served his first stint as Alderman until January 2, 1924.

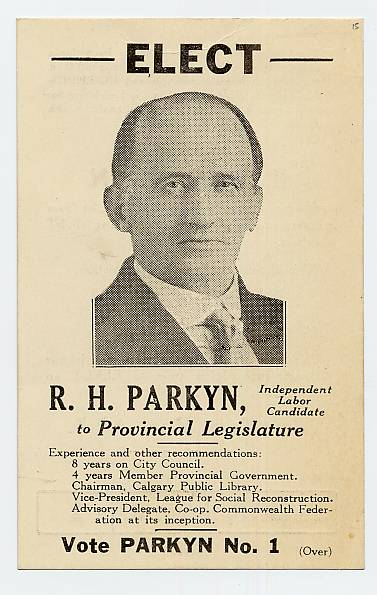
Advertisement for Parkyn

He would return to city council with his re-election on January 2, 1926. He served as both an Alderman and as a member of the Legislative Assembly of Alberta. His second term in office ended on December 31, 1926.

Parkyn would serve three more broken terms as an Alderman January 1, 1933 to December 31, 1934 and January 2, 1935 to January 1, 1936 and his final term from January 1, 1939 until his death on June 13, 1939.

== Provincial career ==
In the 1921 Alberta general election Robert ran his first provincial campaign as a Labor candidate and ended up finishing 8th in a field of 20 candidates. Parkyn was elected in the 1926 Alberta general election this time as an Independent Labor candidate (of labour but not directly tied to any labour group). He won the 5th seat in the Calgary district. The win was seen as an upset. He served a single term in office then was not re-elected in 1930.

Parkyn ran for re-election in the 1930 Alberta general election as an Independent. He was unsuccessful, finishing 7th in Calgary's six-member district at the time.

Parkyn was an advisory delegate during the Co-operative Commonwealth Federation founding meetings.

Parkyn attempted re-election in a 1933 by-election, again running under his Independent Labor banner. In that election he never came close as the vote polarized between the Cooperative Commonwealth Federation candidate Amelia Turner and the Independent candidate Norman Hindsley.

== Late life ==
In 1938 Parkyn became terminally ill with an undisclosed illness. His last wish was to meet the King and Queen of the United Kingdom on their Royal Visit to Canada in 1939. He did so with the help of wife and physician days before his death. He died on June 13, 1939.

Legislative Assembly of Alberta
Preceded by Alex Ross; William Davidson; Robert Marshall; Robert Pearson	MLA Calgary; 1926–1930	Succeeded by Hugh Farthing; John J. Bowlen; Harold McGill
