= Wesley Fletcher Orr =

Canadian politician (1831–1898)

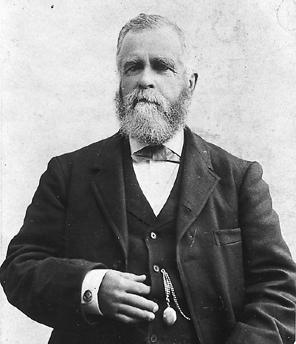

8th Mayor of Calgary
- In office January 16, 1894 – January 6, 1896
- Preceded by: Alexander Lucas
- Succeeded by: Alexander McBride
- In office January 4, 1897 – January 3, 1898
- Preceded by: Alexander McBride
- Succeeded by: Arthur Leslie Cameron

Personal details
- Born: March 3, 1831 Lachute, Lower Canada
- Died: February 16, 1898 (aged 66) Calgary, Alberta, Canada

Wesley Fletcher Orr (March 3, 1831 – February 16, 1898) was a Canadian businessman, journalist, and politician. He was the eighth mayor of the city of Calgary, Alberta.

Orr was born in Lachute, Lower Canada on March 3, 1831, to Samuel G. P. Orr and Jane Hicks. He married Priscilla Victoria Miller circa 1863. Together they had two daughters and one son.

Prior to moving to Calgary, Orr spent his life in various occupations. These include: cattle-dealer, salesman, teacher, and coroner. He also contributed to newspapers such as the Northern Gazette (Barrie, Ontario) and the Hamilton Spectator.

In 1883, Orr was advised by D'Alton McCarthy to buy land at Fort Calgary prior to the arrival of the Canadian Pacific Railway. That year he purchased land south of the Bow River and east of the Elbow River with an associate, Mary S. Schreiber, for $10,000. This was nearly his entire fortune, as he was confident in getting a significant return. Due to complications, Orr settled in Calgary in 1886 to protect his investment. The railway station was not located near his property as expected and his involvement with local politics was to promote development near or on his property. Although his wife refused to follow, he took along his seven-year-old son.

As with his time in the east, Orr spent time in various work opportunities. He thought the road to prosperity came through the railway and was involved in the Canadian Pacific Railway, Alberta Southern Railway Company, Rocky Mountain Railway, Coal Company, North-West Central Railway and a proposed line between Calgary and Hudson Bay. He was also involved in real estate, buffalo bone trading, operated a stone quarry, and was a financial agent. In 1888, he served as the editor of the Calgary Herald.

Orr was also active in municipal politics. Excluding one year, he served as alderman from 1888 through 1894. He chaired the committee of public works which was responsible for the creation of much of the early infrastructure in Calgary, including: electric light, the General Hospital, sewage, municipal financing and water. In 1894, he became Calgary's eighth mayor and served for two one-year terms. Calgary was elevated to a city during November of his first term. With this, Orr became the first mayor of the city of Calgary. After a narrow defeat in 1896, he again took on the post as mayor in 1897 for another one-year term. He personally drew the city crest with its motto "Onward Calgary."

Orr died on February 16, 1898, in the Calgary General Hospital. In 1961, a stained glass window in St. Stephen's Anglican Church was dedicated to his memory.

Preceded by Alexander Lucas	Mayor of Calgary; 1894–1896	Succeeded by Alexander McBride
Preceded by Alexander McBride	Mayor of Calgary; 1897–1898	Succeeded by Arthur Leslie Cameron
