= James Stuart Mackie =

Canadian businessman and politician

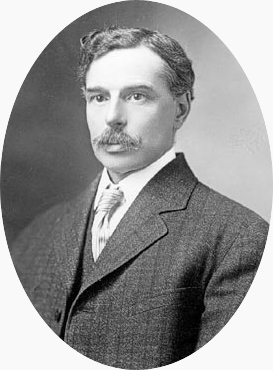

12th Mayor of Calgary
- In office January 7, 1901 – January 6, 1902
- Preceded by: William Henry Cushing
- Succeeded by: Thomas Underwood

Personal details
- Born: March 12, 1860 Westminster, England
- Died: January 21, 1949 (aged 88) Calgary, Alberta

James Stuart Mackie (March 12, 1860 – January 21, 1949) was a Canadian businessman and politician. He was the 12th mayor of Calgary, Alberta.

Mackie was born in Westminster, England in 1860 to Scottish parents. Hearing of opportunities in Canada, he emigrated to Winnipeg, Manitoba in 1882. In Winnipeg, he learnt to become a gunsmith with Hingston Smith Arms Company. In 1885, he went back to England to convince his parents to return with him to Canada. They instead decided to go to Syracuse, New York then later San Francisco, California. While en route back to Canada, Mackie met Grace MacMillan Forgan. Forgan was heading to Omaha, Nebraska to be with her parents. They continued to write each other, and in February, 1892 they were married.

Mackie headed to Calgary in 1886 to open a gun store. Mackie had short-lived business partnerships with Walter Mackay and Joseph Cockel that helped expand his business knowledge beyond gunsmithing. He ended up being involved with taxidermy, sports goods, fishing tackle, cutlery, fur, etc. In November 1899, he purchased the Thomson Bros. bookstore. In 1901, he bought the Thompson Stationery Company.

In 1891, Mackie became a charter member of the Calgary Board of Trade, which is now the Chamber of Commerce. He spent six years as an Alderman of the Calgary City Council. He also held the position of mayor for one term.

Mackie also got himself into real estate. He built the Mackie Block and the Lancaster building in Calgary, which are today prominent historical structures in downtown Calgary.

Preceded by William Henry Cushing	Mayor of Calgary; 1901–1902	Succeeded by Thomas Underwood
