= Alexander McBride =

Canadian politician

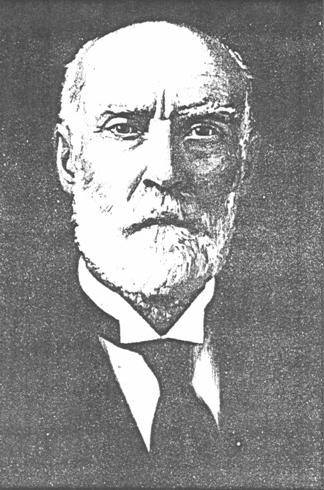

9th Mayor of Calgary
- In office January 6, 1896 – January 4, 1897
- Preceded by: Wesley Fletcher Orr
- Succeeded by: Wesley Fletcher Orr

Personal details
- Born: August 15, 1833 Coburg, Upper Canada
- Died: December 20, 1912 (aged 79) Galt, Ontario

Alexander McBride (August 15, 1833 – December 20, 1912) was the ninth mayor of Calgary, Alberta.

McBride arrived in Calgary in 1886 and established a hardware store on Stephen Avenue, A. McBride and Company. This was Calgary's first hardware store. During the 1890s, he spent five years on city council including one year as mayor in 1896. He narrowly won his mayoral election against incumbent Wesley Fletcher Orr. After his term, McBride did not seek re-election. This allowed Orr to return uncontested to the mayoral seat.

Prior to moving to Calgary, McBride was a tinsmith in London, Ontario. There, he and his wife, Lucy, built in 1874 the home located at 504 Colborne Street. Lucy's asthma was the motivating factor for their move to Calgary.

Early in the 1900s, he left Calgary and spent time in Fort Steele, British Columbia, Cranbrook, British Columbia, and Red Deer, Alberta. Edward, the oldest of his six children, took over his business. McBride died in Galt, Ontario in 1912.

Preceded by Wesley Fletcher Orr	Mayor of Calgary; 1896–1897	Succeeded by Wesley Fletcher Orr
