= Arthur Leslie Cameron =

Canadian politician

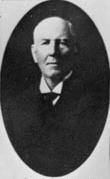

10th Mayor of Calgary
- In office January 3, 1898 – January 3, 1899
- Preceded by: Wesley Fletcher Orr
- Succeeded by: James Reilly
- In office January 14, 1907 – January 2, 1909
- Preceded by: John Emerson
- Succeeded by: Reuben Rupert Jamieson

Personal details
- Born: May 6, 1856 Springfield, Canada West
- Died: January 22, 1940 (aged 83) Victoria, British Columbia

Arthur Leslie Cameron (May 6, 1856 – January 22, 1940) was the tenth mayor of Calgary. His second term was after the creation of the Province of Alberta.

Cameron was born in Springfield, Canada West, on May 6, 1856, to Charles and Jennie (Bell) Cameron. After a builders' apprenticeship in Toronto, Ontario, he decided to move west in 1878. He first went to Manitoba, spending time in Emerson and Brandon. In Brandon, he worked in the lumber business. Here he met Elizabeth Parrish (b. 1860 Brock, Ontario) and in 1882 they were married, Elizabeth's brother was Manitoba MLA William Parrish. Cameron would serve in the Riel rebellion, and in 1886, they moved to Medicine Hat, Alberta.

In 1888, Cameron moved to a fledgling Calgary. He spent two terms on the Calgary City Council in the 1890s, then became mayor in 1898 for a one-year term. Cameron returned to the mayoral office in 1907 and held the position for another two years.

Cameron was a member of the University of Alberta Board of Governors and was also involved in the Calgary Board of Trade and the Alberta Club. Together with his wife Elizabeth, he had four children. Cameron would move to Victoria, British Columbia, in 1913, and would die there on January 22, 1940, at the age of 83.

Preceded by Wesley Fletcher Orr	Mayor of Calgary; 1898–1899	Succeeded by James Reilly
Preceded by John Emerson	Mayor of Calgary; 1907–1909	Succeeded by Reuben Rupert Jamieson
