= John Emerson (politician) =

Canadian politician

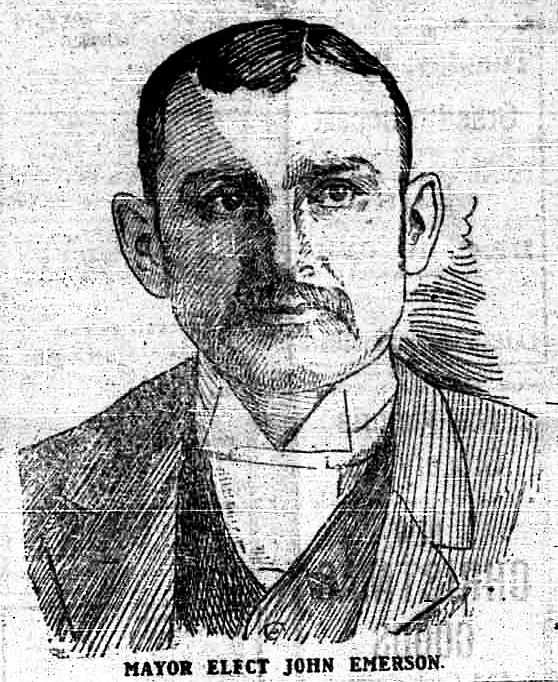
- Pictured in the Daily Herald on December 13, 1904, after his first election as mayor

15th Mayor of Calgary
- In office January 2, 1905 – January 14, 1907
- Preceded by: Silas Alexander Ramsay
- Succeeded by: Arthur Leslie Cameron

Personal details
- Born: June 4, 1859 England, United Kingdom
- Died: July 25, 1932 (aged 73) Burgess Hill, Sussex, England
- Party: Independent
- Occupation: grocer, businessman

John Emerson (June 4, 1859 – July 25, 1932) was the 15th mayor of Calgary, Alberta. He was the mayor at the time that Alberta became a province of Canada, which was on September 1, 1905.

Born in England, Emerson emigrated to Calgary in 1885 and began farming on a homestead just outside the city limits. Soon he left farming and established a successful grocery business on Stephen Avenue.

After spending three years on Calgary City Council, Emerson spent two years as mayor from January 2, 1905 to January 14, 1907. During his tenure as mayor, Calgary hosted a number of prominent visitors. This included: The Prince of Wales (later George V), Prince Arthur of Connaught, and several Governors General. Emerson would lead the unsuccessful Calgary delegation to Ottawa on February 2, 1905 to lobby for Calgary to be named the capital of the new province of Alberta. Emerson would be joined by Major James Walker, William Henry Cushing, and W. M. Davidson.

Emerson retired to Burgess Hill, Sussex, England. He died there in 1932.
