= Thomas Underwood =

Canadian building developer and politician (1863–1948)

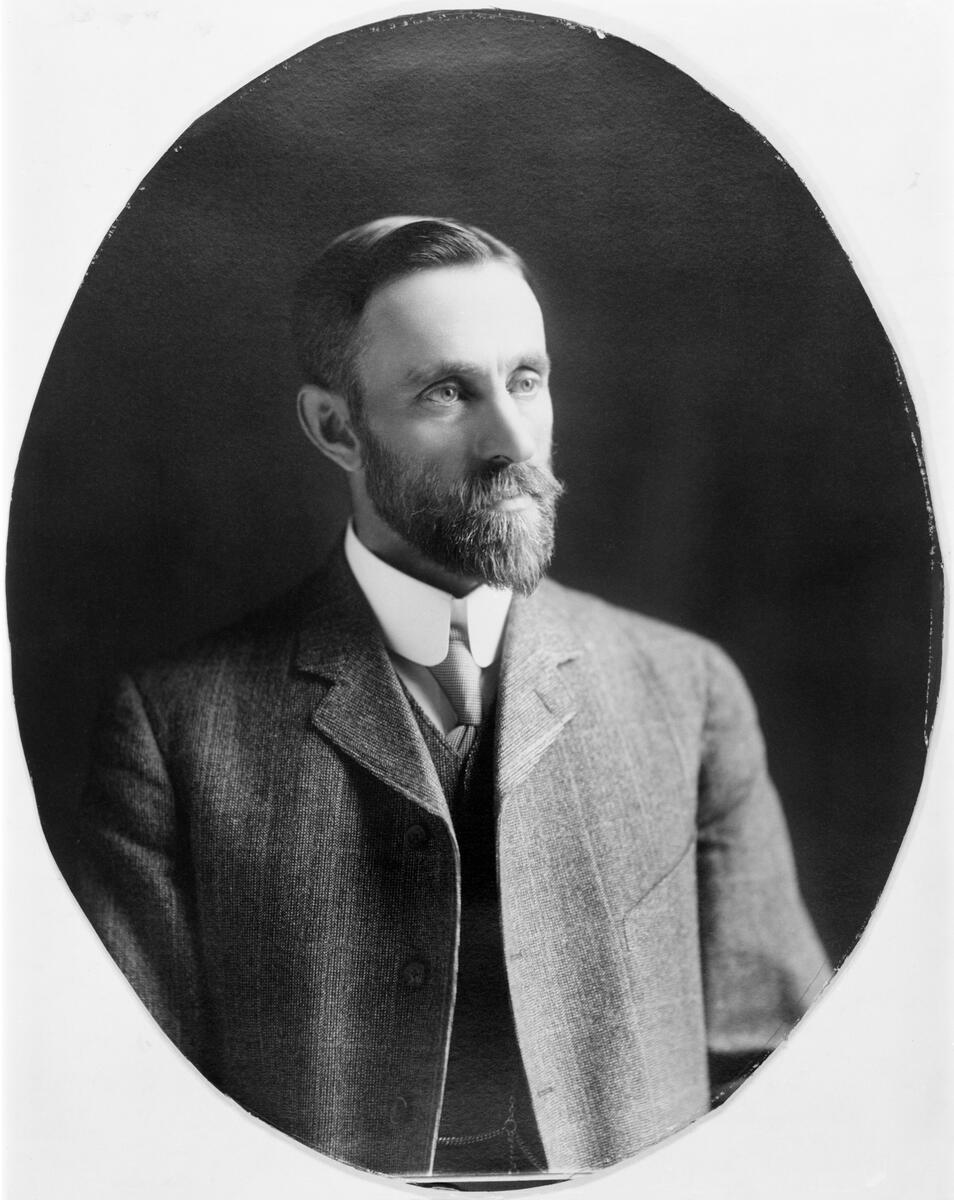

13th Mayor of Calgary
- In office January 6, 1902 – January 5, 1904
- Preceded by: James Stuart Mackie
- Succeeded by: Silas Alexander Ramsay

Personal details
- Born: May 6, 1863 Asfordby, Leicestershire, England
- Died: May 10, 1948 (aged 85) Calgary, Alberta, Canada

Thomas Underwood (May 6, 1863 – May 10, 1948) was a building developer and the 13th mayor of Calgary, Alberta.

Born in Asfordby, Leicestershire, England in 1863, Underwood emigrated to Canada when he was 20. A carpenter by trade, he arrived in Winnipeg, Manitoba in 1883. At first, he worked as a farm hand. Two years later, he joined a Canadian Pacific Railway construction gang and was working in Craigellachie, British Columbia at the time of the last spike was driven to complete the transcontinental railroad. After the railroad was completed, he settled in Calgary.

Underwood spent the first two and a half years working for Jarrett-Cushing Lumber Company. Then he went into business for himself as a builder and contractor. Underwood was involved in the construction of many of the larger buildings in early Calgary. This includes the Bank of Montreal building and Burns Manor for Senator Pat Burns.

Underwood was elected to the Calgary City Council in 1894. He spent eight years on City Council including two years as mayor from 1902-1904.

In 1887, Underwood married Catherine Graves. Together they had nine children, three of whom died in infancy. He was deacon of First Baptist Church for over 30 years, director of the YMCA for 25 years, and a member of the board of directors of Brandon College for ten years. His wife died in 1934 and he died on May 10, 1948, both in Calgary.

| Preceded by James Stuart Mackie | Mayor of Calgary; 1902–1904 | Succeeded by Silas Alexander Ramsay |
