= Silas Alexander Ramsay =

Canadian politician

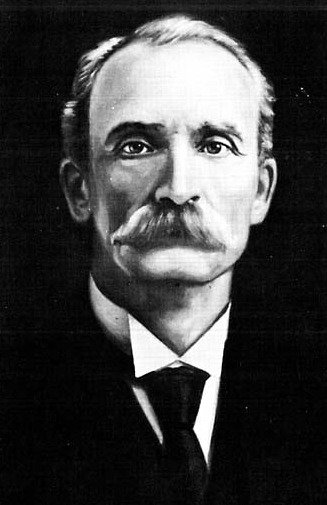

14th Mayor of Calgary
- In office January 5, 1904 – January 2, 1905
- Preceded by: Thomas Underwood
- Succeeded by: John Emerson

Personal details
- Born: August 27, 1850 Aylmer, Canada East
- Died: December 5, 1942 (aged 92) Vancouver, British Columbia, Canada
- Party: Independent
- Spouse: Jessie Ann Wilson (m. 1876; died 1925)

Silas Alexander Ramsay (August 27, 1850 – December 5, 1942) was a Canadian politician and merchant in Alberta, Canada. He served as the 14th mayor of Calgary.

A native of Canada East, Ramsay first travelled to the west with the Wolseley Expedition in a suppression effort to the Red River Rebellion in 1870. Before returning home, he visited the Calgary area and hunted buffalo. This was prior to the initial Fort Calgary settlement, which happened in 1875.

In 1883, Ramsay returned to Calgary and established several businesses. In the 1885 North-West Rebellion, he was a Government dispatch rider. He served eight total years on the city council as an alderman and was also mayor from January 5, 1904, to January 2, 1905, during which time he was a stringent supporter of municipal ownership, working to establish a lighting and water system for the city.

After his retirement in Calgary from his business, he moved to Vancouver, British Columbia, where he died in 1942.

== Early life, career ==
The son of William and Sarah (née Mohr) Ramsay, Silas Alexander Ramsay was born at Aylmer, Quebec in 1850. He attended public schools in his birthplace, completing high school. At the age of nine in 1860, Ramsay would witness the cornerstone lying ceremony of the Canadian Parliament buildings at Parliament Hill. He moved to Almonte, Ontario around 1867 and lived there for three years, when he participated the suppression of the Red River Rebellion in a faction commanded by Garnet Wolseley, 1st Viscount Wolseley. During that time he participated in the Wolseley Expedition, travelling through Port Arthur and then embarking westward, in a journey of around three months, to Fort Garry (presently Winnipeg). Being the first trip he undertook Canadian West, he also visited the Calgary area and hunted buffalo, prior to Fort Calgary's establishment in 1875. He would later home via railway through Ottawa after heading through Montana and St. Paul, Minnesota. There he would open up a general store and operate it for around eight years, when he closed up and became a wool merchant for four years.

Intrigued by the opportunity and potential it held, in 1883, Ramsay decided to move west, settling in the village of Calgary, in the North-West Territories, which was then the terminus of the Canadian Pacific Railway. At Calgary he would ranch and enter the agricultural product manufacturing business as an agent for an Ontario company, producing buggies, wagons, ploughs, and mowers. This was one of the first such businesses in the province of Alberta. He was also an agent for a sewing machine company, with an office located on Stephen Avenue. When the North-West Rebellion of 1885 broke out, Ramsay would be involved in it, serving as a government dispatch messenger and later a scout. During his rebellion duties, he was attacked in encounter with local First Nations peoples, forcing him to fire shots from his rifle in self-defence. In Calgary he also built the Ramsay Block, on a piece of land, opposite of the city's old post office.

== Civic politics ==
Keenly interested in Calgary's civic politics, Ramsay first served as an alderman on the Calgary City Council from January 7, 1895, to January 3, 1899, and January 6, 1902, to January 5, 1904. A strong supporter of public ownership of utilities, he also served a stint as chairman of the council's Water and Light Committee, in which he oversaw the installation of the city's first electric lighting system, as well as the purchase of the water system by the municipality from a private company. He was later lauded for this action by the Calgary Albertan, who stated that it had helped set the foundations the municipal utility system that was later established and improved upon of Calgary. He was an Independent.

On December 7, 1903, municipal nominations day for the upcoming election, Ramsay was acclaimed as mayor of Calgary, with no opposing nominees for the office. Ramsay served as mayor until January 5, 1905, when he was succeeded by John Emerson. During his term, the city moved to establish a numbering system for its streets, and the Canadian Pacific Railway initiated an irrigation project east of the city, which would later become Chestermere Lake, Alberta. He did not seek re-election as mayor in the 1904 election, instead accepting a nomination to once again serve as alderman. He was later elected and would serve a final aldermanic term, from January 2, 1905, to January 14, 1907. He later retired from his business around 1921 and moved to Vancouver.

== Personal life ==
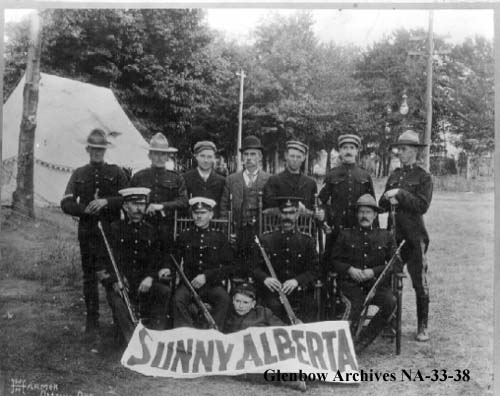
Ramsay and his rifle team at the Dominion Rifle Association in Ottawa, Ontario

Ramsay married Jessie Ann Wilson in Alamonte on April 18, 1876. Together they had four children: Bertha Maud, Robert Wilson, Charles Henry, and Percival Clod. One of his brothers served as mayor of Prince Albert, Saskatchewan. He was active member of the Calgary Rifle Club, and the Methodist church. In 1939, at the age of 90, Ramsay travelled to Winnipeg to visit the site of the Fort Garry gate, where he had travelled almost 70 years prior. At the time it was noted that he was one of the last remaining survivors of the Wolseley Expedition. He died at his daughter's home in Vancouver, British Columbia on December 5, 1942, at the age of 92. He was survived by his daughter and two sons. His wife predeceased him on May 16, 1925, in Vancouver.

It was said about him that he was "one of those wholesome toilers in behalf of the people who never grow old in years and energy." A 1912 biography in the publication History of the province of Alberta noted that Ramsay was a man of "broad mental grasp, cosmopolitan ideas and notable business sagacity", with a "thorough understanding of life, its principles and possibilities" that was "honoured and respected by all". His former residence was in the present-day Calgary neighbourhood of Ramsay, situated east of the Elbow River and south of the CPR tracks, which is named in his honour.

== Bibliography ==
- Cormier, Ray (1975), Inglewood and Ramsay : cradle of Calgary, Calgary, Alberta: Century Calgary Publications
- Leslie, Jean (1975), Past and present : people, places and events in Calgary : accounts, vol. S. A. Ramsay, Mayor 1904–1905, Calgary, Alberta: Century Calgary Publications
- MacRae, Archibald Oswald (1912), History of the province of Alberta, vol. II, Calgary, Alberta: Western Canada History Co, pp. 939–940
