= 1917 Calgary municipal election =

Municipal election 1917 in Calgary, Canada

← 1916	December 10, 1917	1918 →
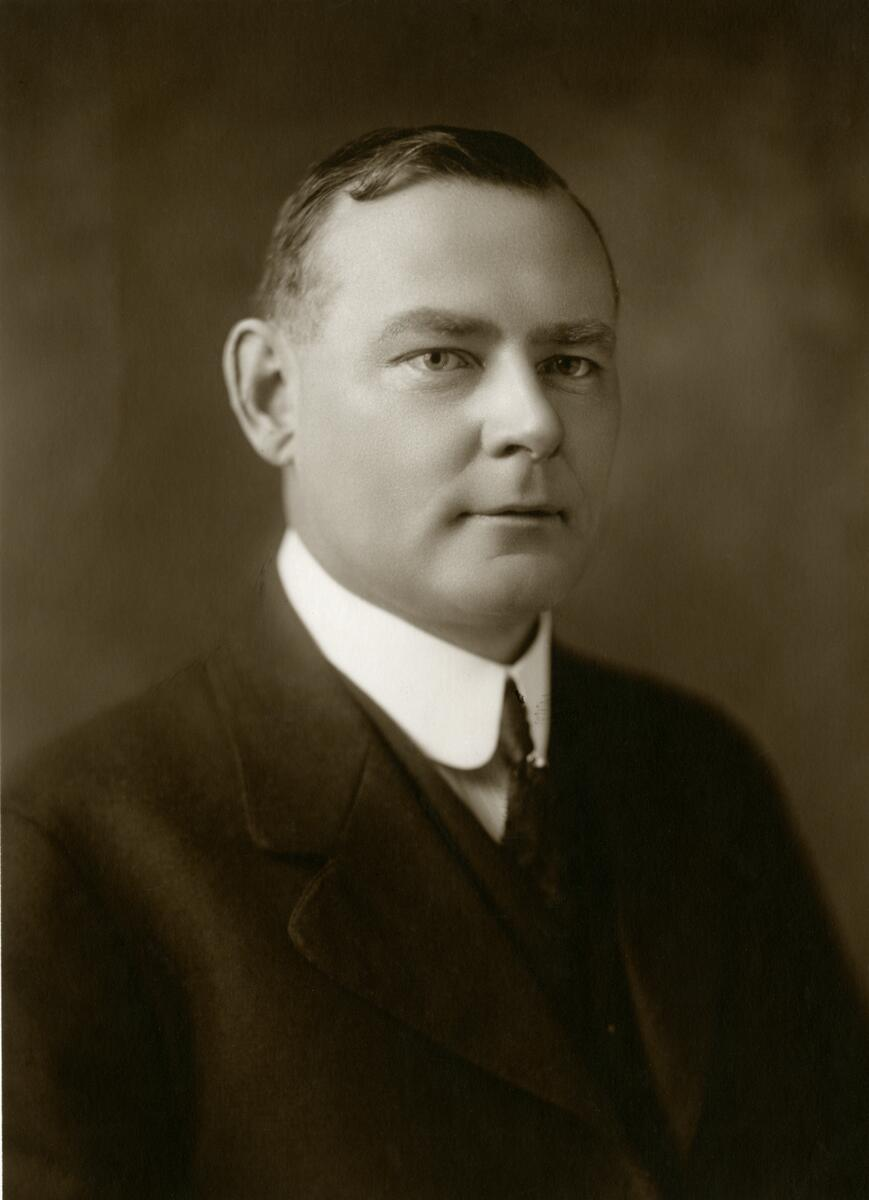
Candidate	Michael Copps Costello	Herbert Bealey Adshead
Popular vote	2,633	2,622
Percentage	50.10%	49.90%
Mayor before election
Michael Copps Costello
Elected mayor
Michael Copps Costello

The 1917 Calgary municipal election took place on December 10, 1917, to elect a mayor to a one-year term, and a commissioner and six aldermen to two year terms, and three aldermen for a one-year term. These officials sat on the thirty-fourth Calgary City Council. In addition, four members for the Public School Board, three members for the Separate School Board were elected. Also, voters voted on three plebiscites on early closing and half holiday for businesses, payment for aldermen, and election of commissioners for two years.

The nine elected aldermen joined Aldermen John Sidney Arnold, Alexander McTaggart, and Isaac Gideon Ruttle who were previously elected to Calgary City Council for two-year terms in 1916. Robert John Tallon had also been elected the previous year but had resigned to run for commissioner in this election.

Calgary's 1917 municipal election was the first election in Canada to use a system of Proportional representation, under which city councillors were elected using Single Transferable Voting (STV). They were elected at-large in a multiple-member district that covered the whole city. In this election nine councillors were elected in a single contest.

As part of the electoral reform, the mayor and commissioner were henceforth to be elected using Instant-runoff voting. But as both of those contests in this election involved only two candidates, the process was no different than First past the post.

== Background ==
Extension of voting franchise to all residents male or female who are British subjects 21 years of age who have been residents of the city for six months prior to June 1 of the year of a municipal election. This was the first election in Calgary under full franchise.

Mayor Costello and Commissioner Graves had been acclaimed upon the close of nominations on December 7, 1915.

== Results ==
=== Mayor ===
Candidate	Votes	Percent
Michael Copps Costello	2,633	
Herbert Bealey Adshead	2,622	

=== Commissioner ===
Candidate	Votes	Percent
Arthur Garnet Graves	2,822	
Robert John Tallon	2,378	

=== Councillors ===
Nine seats were open in this election, an unusually large number for a Canadian STV election.

Three one-year alderman position were opened on Council, following resignations of Adshead, Tallon and Patrick. The six candidates elected with the highest "peak" votes were elected to two year terms, while the other three to be elected were elected to a one-year term.

To be elected under STV, a candidate needed a number of votes equal to or exceeding quota (one-tenth of the votes cast in this election), either in first preference votes or accumulated through vote transfers from other candidates, or by surviving until the field of candidates was thinned to just the number of remaining open seats

The use of STV is said to have produced the emergence and increased representation of neighbourhood or community-based political groups on city council.

Calgary elected its first woman city councillor in this election.

Total valid votes 5189 Quota 519

Candidate	1st Count Votes	Final votes	Notes
Andrew Graham Broatch	855		(Labour) elected in the first count
Frank Roy Freeze	737		elected in the first count
Samuel Hunter Adams	731		(Business) elected in the first count
Robert Colin Marshall	707		(Business) elected in the first count
Albert Mahaffy	266	584	
Hannah Gale	334	582	Labour-oriented. nom. by a women's group
Philip Dorland Sprung (One Year)	397	521	
James Bernard Creagan (One Year)	326	510	
Frederick John Marshall (One Year)	281	480	(Business) elected on 10th Count, elected with partial quota as last remaining candidate when field of candidates thinned.
W. Brooks Waters	281	430	
F.J. Bull	197	377	
G.E. Williams	83	122	
J.E. Hammond	39	68	

Almost all front runners the first count were elected in the end. Of the top nine in the first count, only Waters was not elected, his vote tally being passed by both Mahaffy and Marshall. But single voting in a multi-seat district produced basic fairness even before transfers were applied. Both Labour and business were represented in the font runners even in the first count.

Mahaffy, initially the 9th place candidate, gradually accumulated more votes from other candidates and when he passed quota and was elected, on about the 10th Count was holding more than 580 votes.

== Plebiscite ==
=== Early closing ===
Early closing and half holiday.

- For - 3,395
- Against - 1,774

=== Payment of Aldermen ===
- For - 1,807
- Against - 3,019

=== Election of commissioners for two year terms ===
- For - 3,814
- Against - 1,183

== See also ==
- List of Calgary municipal elections
