= 1923 Calgary municipal election =

Election in Alberta, Canada

← 1922	December 12, 1923	1924 →
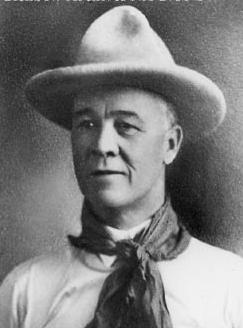
Candidate	George Harry Webster	Angus Smith
Popular vote	8,266	2,680
Percentage	75.52%	24.48%
Mayor before election
George Harry Webster
Elected mayor
George Harry Webster

The 1923 Calgary municipal election was held on December 12, 1923 to elect a mayor and six aldermen to sit on Calgary City Council. Additionally a commissioner, four members for the public school board and three members for the separate school board.

There were twelve aldermen on city council, but six of the positions were already filled: Frederick Johnston, Thomas H. Crawford, Frederick Ernest Osborne, Fred J. White, Neil I. McDermid, and John Walker Russell, were all elected to two-year terms in 1922 and were still in office.

The 1923 election was the first where a mayor would serve for two years after the bylaw providing for a two-year term was approved by the electorate.

A number of plebiscites were held, all requiring a two-thirds majority to pass.

The election was held under the Single Transferable Voting/Proportional Representation (STV/PR) with the term for candidates being two years.

The first woman elected to Calgary City Council, Annie Gale was defeated in the election. The Calgary Daily Herald reported approximately 4,240 women voted in the election, compared to 6,582 men.

== Results ==
=== Mayor ===
Webster was elected on the first count.

Party	Candidate	Votes	%	Elected
Civic Government Association	George Harry Webster	8,266	75.52%	✓
Dominion Labor	Angus Smith	2,680	24.48%	
Total valid votes		10,946		
Approximate rejected ballots		176		

=== Council ===
Quota for election was 1,574.

Party	Candidate	Votes	%	Count	Elected
Civic Government Association	Thomas Alexander Hornibrook	1,824	17.37%	1st	✓
Civic Government Association	Robert Cadogan Thomas	1,598	15.22%	1st	✓
Civic Government Association	Sam S. Savage	1,339	12.75%	3rd	✓
Civic Government Association	Harry W. Ross	1,139	10.85%	8th	✓
Dominion Labor	Walter Little	938	8.94%	8th	✓
Dominion Labor	Andrew Davison	935	8.91%	8th	✓
Dominion Labor	Annie Gale	793	7.55%	eliminated	
Dominion Labor	Robert H. Parkyn	720	6.86%	eliminated	
Independent	George D. Batchelor	380	3.62%	eliminated	
Independent	Daniel Dubber	375	3.57%	eliminated	
Independent	J. Aaron	238	2.27%	eliminated	
Independent	Hugh J. Duffield	219	2.09%	eliminated	
Total valid votes		10,498			

=== Public School Board ===
Party	Candidate	Votes	%	Count	Elected
Civic Government Association	Fred S. Selwood	3,119	31.11%	1st	✓
Dominion Labor	Thomas. B. Riley	1,797	17.92%	3rd	✓
Civic Government Association	Annie E. Langford	1,785	17.80%	2nd	✓
Civic Government Association	A. C. Newcomb	1,691	16.86%	2nd	✓
Independent	Robert J. Cameron	1,021	10.18%		
Independent	Minnie B. Drummond	614	6.12%		
Total valid votes		10,027			

=== Separate School Board ===
Party	Candidate	Votes	%	Count	Elected
Civic Government Association	John Burns	X	X%	1st	✓
Civic Government Association	V. H. Burgard		X%	2nd	✓
Dominion Labor	J. H. O'Brian	X	X%	3rd	✓
Independent	G. D. Venidi	X	X%		
Independent	W. D. Mackay	44	X%		
Total valid votes		X			

- Note: archived copies of The Calgary Daily Herald are poorly scanned and vote totals for candidates are not visible.

=== Plebiscite ===
==== Two Year Term for Mayor ====
Two Year Term for Mayor - Passed

Two Year Term for Mayor	Votes	%
Yes		%
No		%

==== River Protection Bylaw ====
Bylaw for protection of river. - Defeated

River Protection Bylaw	Votes	%
Yes		%
No		%

== See also ==
- List of Calgary municipal elections
