= 1920 Calgary municipal election =

Election in Alberta, Canada

← 1919	December 15, 1920	1921 →
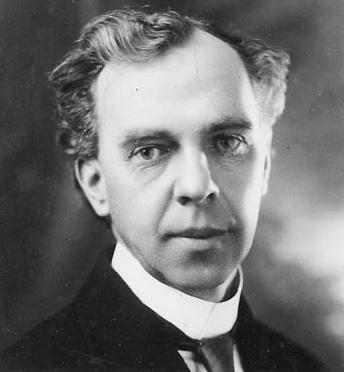

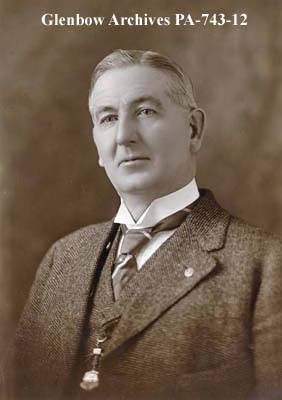
Candidate	Samuel Hunter Adams	Issac G. Ruttle
Popular vote	5,249	2,786
Percentage	65.33%	34.67%
Mayor before election
Robert Colin Marshall
Elected mayor
Samuel Hunter Adams

The 1920 Calgary municipal election was held on December 15, 1920 to a Mayor and six Aldermen to sit on Calgary City Council for two years, and two Aldermen to sit for one year. Additionally a Commissioner, three members for the Public School Board and two members for the Separate School Board were elected.

There were twelve aldermen on city council, but six of the positions were already filled: Frank Freeze, George Harry Webster, Annie Gale, and Fred Shouldice, were all elected to two-year terms in 1919 and were still in office. Both Samuel Hunter Adams and Issac G. Ruttle resigned their positions as Aldermen to run for mayor.

A number of plebiscites were held, all requiring a majority to pass.

The election was held under the Single Transferable Voting/Proportional Representation (STV/PR) with the term for Alderman being two years and the Mayor being one year.

== Background ==
In the 1920 election for mayor, Adams ran against his only challenger, and fellow alderman Isaac G. Ruttle. Adams and Ruttle were both friends and agreed to spend only $100 during the election, $50 for advertisements in the Calgary Herald and $50 for advertisements in the Albertan. During the campaign both candidates would travel together as Adams did not have a car, and alternated who would speak first at each event. Eventually both candidates broke the agreement to spend only $100 with Ruttle placing advertisements between films in one of the City's theaters, and Adams countered with a $25 advertisement in the Market Examiner. Adams won the election held on December 15, 1920 with approximately 60% of the vote and assumed the role of Calgary's 21st Mayor on January 3, 1920, serving until January 2, 1923.

== Results ==
=== Mayor ===
Party	Candidate	Votes	%	Elected
Dominion Labor	Samuel Hunter Adams	5,249	65.33%	✓
Dominion Labor	Issac G. Ruttle	2,786	34.67%	
Total valid votes		8,803		
Approximate rejected ballots		1,200		

=== Council ===
Party	Candidate	Votes	%	Count	Term length	Elected
Dominion Labor	Fred J. White	1,222	15.44%	1st	2 Years	✓
Dominion Labor	John Sidney Arnold	924	11.68%	1st	2 Years	✓
Civic Government Association	John Hugill	905	11.44%	1st	2 Years	✓
Dominion Labor	Walter Little	813	10.28%	2nd	2 Years	✓
Civic Government Association	Alexander McTaggart	758	9.58%	3rd	2 Years	✓
Civic Government Association	Charles Stevenson	691	8.73%	8th	2 Years	✓
Civic Government Association	Neil I. McDermid	705	8.91%	8th	1 Year	✓
Independent	Geoffrey Silvester	431	5.45%	X	1 Year	✓
Independent	George E. Williams	367	4.64%			
Independent	George D. Batchelor	359	4.54%			
Independent	William Turner	295	3.73%			
Independent	W. H. Beal	262	3.31%			
Independent	J. B. Douglas	180	2.28%			
Total valid votes		7,912				
Approximate rejected ballots		1,200				

=== Commissioner ===
Party	Candidate	Votes	%	Elected
Dominion Labor	A. J. Samis	4,496	58.01%	✓
Dominion Labor	A. G. Broatch	2,192	28.28%	
Dominion Labor	Angus Smith	1,062	13.70%	
Total valid votes		7,750		
Approximate rejected ballots		1,200		

=== Public School Board ===
Party	Candidate	Votes	%	Count	Elected
Civic Government Association	H. A. Sinnott	3,167	24.62%	1st	✓
Independent	Marion Carson	1,363	17.68%	1st	✓
Dominion Labor	Lillie C. Woodhall	1,004	15.81%	3rd	✓
Civic Government Association	Robert H. Parkyn	954	13.00%		
Independent	H. M. McCallum	954	12.22%		
Total valid votes		7,343			

=== Separate School Board ===
Party	Candidate	Votes	%	Count	Elected
Civic Government Association	J. Harcourt O'Reilly	155	24.62%	1st	✓
Independent	R. J. McLean	79	17.68%	1st	✓
Dominion Labor	M. J. Sheedy	83	15.81%		
Civic Government Association	McKay	36	13.00%		
Independent	Fay	26	12.22%		
Total valid votes		379			

=== Plebiscites ===
==== Gas Plebiscite ====
Gas Plebiscite	Votes	%
To let rates stand, no franchise changes	5,417	74.49%
Council proposal, 42 cent gas, 2.5 years	337	4.63%
Mayor proposal, 50 cent gas, rebate	208	2.86%
Company proposal, arbitration	1,310	18.01%

==== Curfew Bylaw ====
To institute Curfew Law in Calgary.

Curfew Bylaw	Votes	%
Yes	4,421	60.82%
No	2,848	39.18%

==== Aldermen Pay ====
To pay Aldermen $500 per year.

Aldermen Pay	Votes	%
Yes	2,895	39.59%
No	4,417	60.41%

==== Capitalize Street Railway Expenditures Bylaw ====
Vote on bylaw to capitalize $250,000 street railway expenditures.

Capitalize Street Railway Bylaw	Votes	%
For	1,635	43.00%
Against	2,167	57.00%

==== Waterworks Extension Programme Bylaw ====
Vote on bylaw for waterworks extension programme.

Waterworks Extension Bylaw	Votes	%
For	2,057	53.28%
Against	1,804	46.72%

== See also ==
- List of Calgary municipal elections
