= 1919 Calgary municipal election =

Election in Alberta, Canada

← 1918	December 10, 1919	1920 →
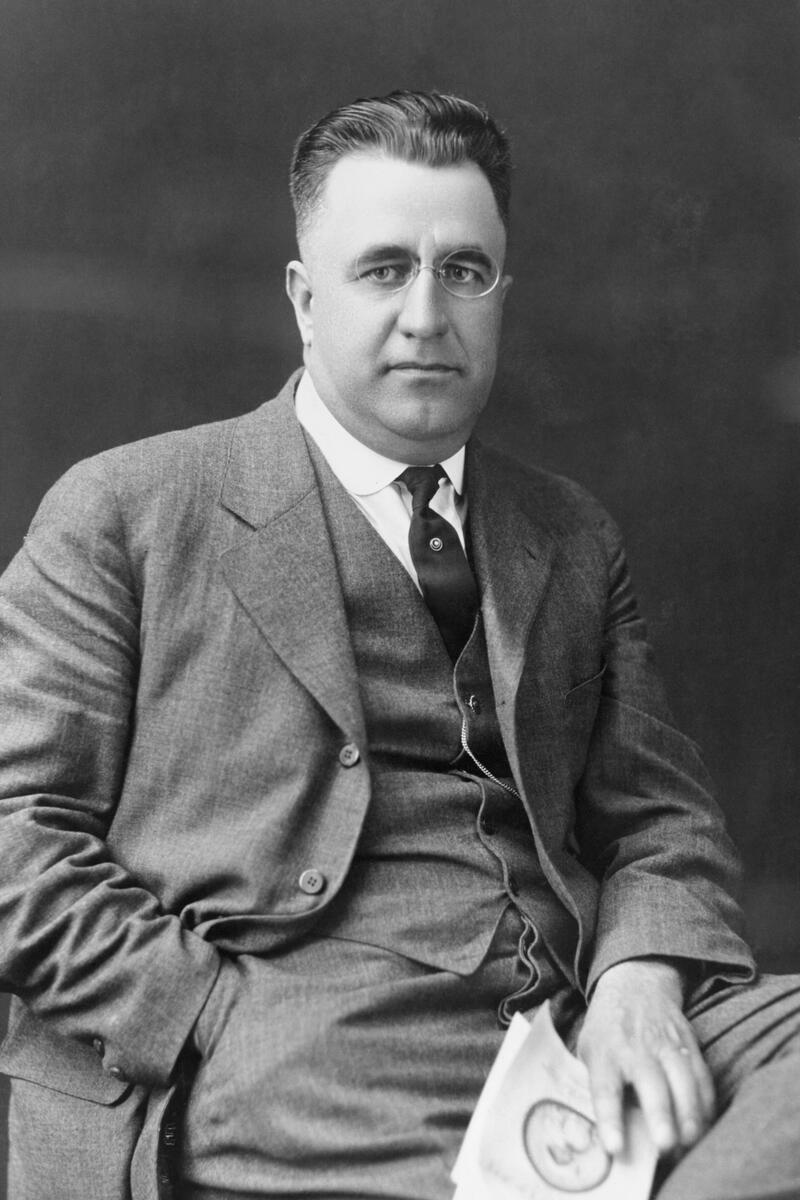

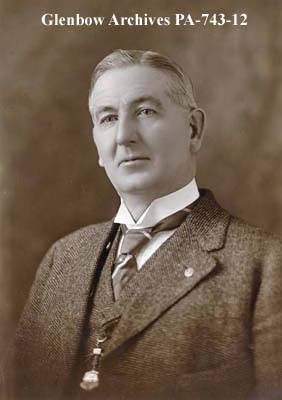
Candidate	Robert Colin Marshall	Issac G. Ruttle
Popular vote	4,663	2,389
Percentage	66.12%	33.88%
Mayor before election
Robert Colin Marshall
Elected mayor
Robert Colin Marshall

The 1919 Calgary municipal election was held on December 10, 1919, to a Mayor and six Aldermen to sit on Calgary City Council. Additionally a Commissioner, four members for the Public School Board, three members for the Separate School Board, and six members of the Hospital Board were elected.

There were twelve aldermen on city council, but six of the positions were already filled: David Ernest Black, Frederick Arthur Johnston, John McCoubrey, Alexander McTaggart, Frederick Ernest Osborne and Fred J. White, were all elected to two-year terms in 1918 and were still in office.

A number of plebiscites were held, all requiring a majority to pass.

The election was held under the Single Transferable Voting/Proportional Representation (STV/PR) with the term for Alderman being two years and the Mayor being one year.

The turnout of 7,052 was the largest turnout in Calgary's history at the time, despite temperatures forecasted for −26 °C.

== Background ==
The Calgary Daily Herald would endorse Robert Colin Marshall for mayor, noting his accomplishments throughout his previous term including a proposal for favorable view of a Dominion government housing scheme, and improvements to the city's hospitals. The Herald would also endorse Adams, Freeze, Shouldice, Stevenson, Sylvester and Webster for Alderman roles.

Voting Rights for the election were significantly extended. As provided by The Calgary Daily Herald on December 6, 1919:
The following persons are entitled to vote at the municipal elections on Wednesday December 10, 1919:

1. All those persons whose names appear on the voters' list of the city, for the year 1919. These will vote at the polling booths as noted on the voters' list.
2. Companies incorporated under a Dominion statute or Northwest Territories ordinance or act; under any act of the province of Alberta; or any company registered under any act of the said province, having a permanent place of business within the city, and assessed as in the section mentioned, may be resolution, authorize some one resident officer of the company, not otherwise entitled to vote, to vote, and such officer shall be entitled to vote at such election. (Note-The term "resident officer," means a secretary, treasurer, manager, director or president. The resolution appointing the officer shall give the officer's name and the capacity in which said officer claims to be entitled to vote, and a copy of the resolution will be filed with the deputy returning officer. In conformance with recent legal ruling, only the above-mentioned officers can vote for companies.)
3. Soldiers, citizens of Calgary before enlisting who have returned from overseas to live at Calgary since July 31, 1919. These must appear in person at the city clerk's office and produce their discharge certificates as proof that they have returned to Calgary after July 31, 1919. A certificate will be issued by the city clerk to all proved eligible to vote at the city hall booth.
4. Persons whose name appear on the assessment roll and whose address is outside of Calgary. These must apply to the city for a certificate if they have not already obtained same or requested the city clerk to add their names to the voters' list at the time of revision, June and July, 1919.

== Results ==
=== Mayor ===
1919 Calgary municipal election: Mayor
Party	Candidate	Votes	%	Elected
-	Robert Colin Marshall	4,663	66.12%	✓
-	Issac G. Ruttle	2,389	33.88%	
Total valid votes		7,052	-	

=== Council ===
Vote tallies listed below are vote tallies in the First Count. Later all candidates except Webster received a larger number of votes due to vote transfers from elected or eliminated candidates. Webster was elected on the first count, by exceeding quota by first preference votes alone.

Six open seats. Quota: 975

1919 Calgary municipal election: Council
Party	Candidate	Votes	%	Elected
Independent	George Harry Webster	981	14.38%	✓
Dominion Labor	Andrew Graham Broatch	931	13.65%	✓
Citizen's Committee	Frank R. Freeze	885	12.97%	✓
Independent	Annie Gale	868	12.72%	✓
Citizen's Committee	Samuel Hunter Adams	706	10.35%	✓
Citizen's Committee	Fred L. Shouldice	614	9.00%	✓
-	J. J. Atherton	422	6.19%	
Dominion Labor	James Rae	311	4.56%	
Independent	Charles Stevenson	309	4.53%	
-	Deachman	250	3.66%	
-	Geoffrey Silvester	246	3.61%	
Dominion Labor	Walter Smitten	135	1.98%	
-	J. E. Harris	85	1.25%	
-	Thomas Vickers	79	1.16%	
Total valid votes		6,822	-	
Source(s) The election was held under the Single Transferable Voting/Proportional Representation (STV/PR) with the term for Alderman being two years Totals above are first preference votes. The quota necessary to be elected was 976.

=== Public School Board ===
The quota was 1,276 votes.

Party	Candidate	Votes	%	Count	Elected
-	F. S. Selwood	1,527	23.95%	1st	✓
-	Mrs. Langford	1,290	20.24%	1st	✓
Dominion Labor	R. B. Gale	1,007	15.80%	4th	✓
-	Alex Russell	782	12.27%		
Dominion Labor	Harry Pryde	740	11.61%	4th	✓
-	A. Scott Dawson	694	10.89%		
-	W. S. Potts	335	5.25%		
Total valid votes		6,375	-		

=== Separate School Board ===
Party	Candidate	Votes	%	Elected
-	J. Burns	113	39.79%	✓
-	G. D. Venini	99	34.86%	✓
-	T. W. Baker	45	15.85%	✓
-	Patrick Foley	27	9.51%	
Total valid votes		284		

=== Plebiscites ===
==== Early Closing Bylaw ====
Are you in favor of amending Early Closing Bylaw 1918, so as to permit the Druggists to sell after closing hours the following goods: Infants' Foods and Infant necessities, Tooth preparations, Tooth Brishes, Toilet articles, (excluding toilet and manicure sets or cases), Shaving supplies, Perfumes, Toilet Waters, Chest protectors, Whisks and Brushes, Rubber sundries, Toilet soap, Dyes, Amateur Developing and Printing.

Curfew Bylaw	Votes	%
Yes		%
No		%

==== Aldermen Pay ====
To pay Aldermen $500 per year with deductions for non-attendance at meetings.

Aldermen Pay	Votes	%
Yes	2,978	45.43%
No	3,577	54.57%

==== Civic Improvements Bylaw ====
Four separate votes on bylaw to spend $940,000 on civic improvements.

Civic Improvement Spending Bylaws	Votes	%
For	X	X%
Against	X	X%

== See also ==
- List of Calgary municipal elections
