= 1921 Calgary municipal election =

Election in Alberta, Canada

← 1920	December 15, 1921	1922 →
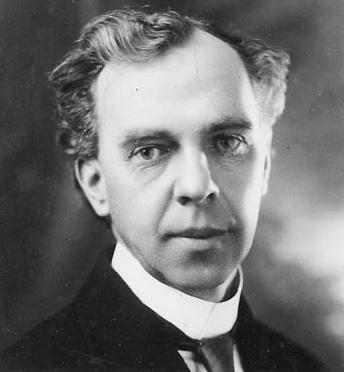
Candidate	Samuel Hunter Adams
Popular vote	Acclaimed
Mayor before election
Samuel Hunter Adams
Elected mayor
Samuel Hunter Adams

The 1921 Calgary municipal election was held on December 15, 1921 to elect six aldermen to sit on Calgary City Council. Additionally a commissioner, four members for the public school board and three members for the separate school board. The Mayor Samuel Hunter Adams was acclaimed.

There were twelve aldermen on city council, but six of the positions were already filled: Fred J. White, John Sidney Arnold, John Hugill, Charles Stevenson, Walter Little and Alexander McTaggart, were all elected to two-year terms in 1920 and were still in office.

A number of plebiscites were held, all requiring a two-thirds majority to pass. The only successful plebiscite reduced the number of commissioners election from three including the mayor, to two including the major.

The election was held under the Single Transferable Voting/Proportional Representation (STV/PR) with the term for candidates being two years.

A number of women were refused ballots during the 1921 election, the Calgary Daily Herald estimated a total of 1,000 to 1,500 women were refused votes. Women were refused who were not on the voting list, and many women assumed they would be on the voting list due to being registered for the 1920 Calgary municipal election.

== Results ==
=== Council ===
Party	Candidate	Votes	%	2nd Count	Elected
Citizen's Committee	George Harry Webster	1,499	16.49%	0	✓
Dominion Labor	Andrew Davison	1,142	12.56%	0	✓
Dominion Labor	Annie Gale	1,051	11.56%	0	✓
Citizen's Committee	James H. Garden	646	7.11%	0	✓
Dominion Labor	George D. Batchelor	674	7.42%	0	✓
Dominion Labor	Robert H. Parkyn	781	8.59%	0	✓
Independent	John Walker Russell	753	8.28%	0	
Citizen's Committee	Neil Intyre McDermid	609	6.70%	0	
Independent	George J. Connolly	469	5.16%	0	
Citizen's Committee	Geoffrey Silvester	381	4.19%	0	
Independent	George E. Williams	301	3.31%	0	
Dominion Labor	John Stark	300	3.30%	0	
Independent	J. B. Douglas	200	2.20%	0	
Independent	William Turner	176	1.94%	0	
Independent	F. C. Potts	107	1.18%	0	
Total valid votes		9,089			

- Full Names and affiliations of unsuccessful candidates not available.

=== Commissioner ===
Party	Candidate	Votes	%	Elected
Citizen's Committee	Angus Smith	4,654	52.90%	✓
Citizen's Committee	Arther Garnet Graves	4,325	47.10%	
Total valid votes		8,979		

=== Public School Board ===
Party	Candidate	Votes	%	Elected
Dominion Labor	R. B. Gale	2,051	25.47%	✓
Citizen's Committee	Fred S. Selwood	1,461	18.14%	✓
Dominion Labor	Thomas B. Riley	1,127	13.99%	✓
Independent	Harry Pryde	1,049	13.03%	
Citizen's Committee	Clifford T. Jones	1,028	12.77%	✓
Independent	V. H. Macaulay	834	10.36%	
Citizen's Committee	H. T. Whittemore	503	6.25%	
Total valid votes		8,053		

=== Separate School Board ===
Party	Candidate	Votes	%	Elected
Independent	P. V. Burgard	215	32.77%	✓
Independent	George D. Venini	183	27.90%	✓
Independent	M. A. Harvey	106	36.16%	
Independent	A. P. Donnelly	94	14.33%	✓
Independent	John J. Bowlen	58	8.84%	
Total valid votes		656		

- Political affiliations are not available.

=== Plebiscites ===
All plebiscites required a two-thirds majority to pass. Only the reduction in number of commissioners plebiscite passed.

==== Reduce number of commissioners ====
Plebiscite to reduce number of commissioners from three, including the mayor, to two including the mayor. - Passed

Reduce Number of Commissioners	Votes	%
Yes	3,202	81.69%
No	718	18.31%

==== Hospital Expenditure ====
Plebiscite to capitalize $71,381.61 of hospital expenditure and place it in previous $155,000 bylaw. - Defeated

Hospital Expenditure	Votes	%
Yes	2,150	46.20%
No	2,504	53.80%

==== Victoria Park Bath House ====
Plebiscite to build public bath house in Victoria Park with $30,000 borrowed from electric light fund. - Defeated

Victoria Park Bath House	Votes	%
Yes	1,578	40.52%
No	2,316	59.48%

==== Sewer Connection Bylaw ====
Bylaw for sewer connections, $25,000. - Defeated

Sewer Connection Bylaw	Votes	%
Yes	2,028	55.26%
No	1,642	44.74%

==== Water Connection Bylaw ====
Bylaw for water connections, $25,000. - Defeated

WaterConnection Bylaw	Votes	%
Yes	1,951	53.32%
No	1,708	46.68%

== See also ==
- List of Calgary municipal elections
