= 1916 Calgary municipal election =

Election in Alberta, Canada

← 1915	December 11, 1916	1917 →
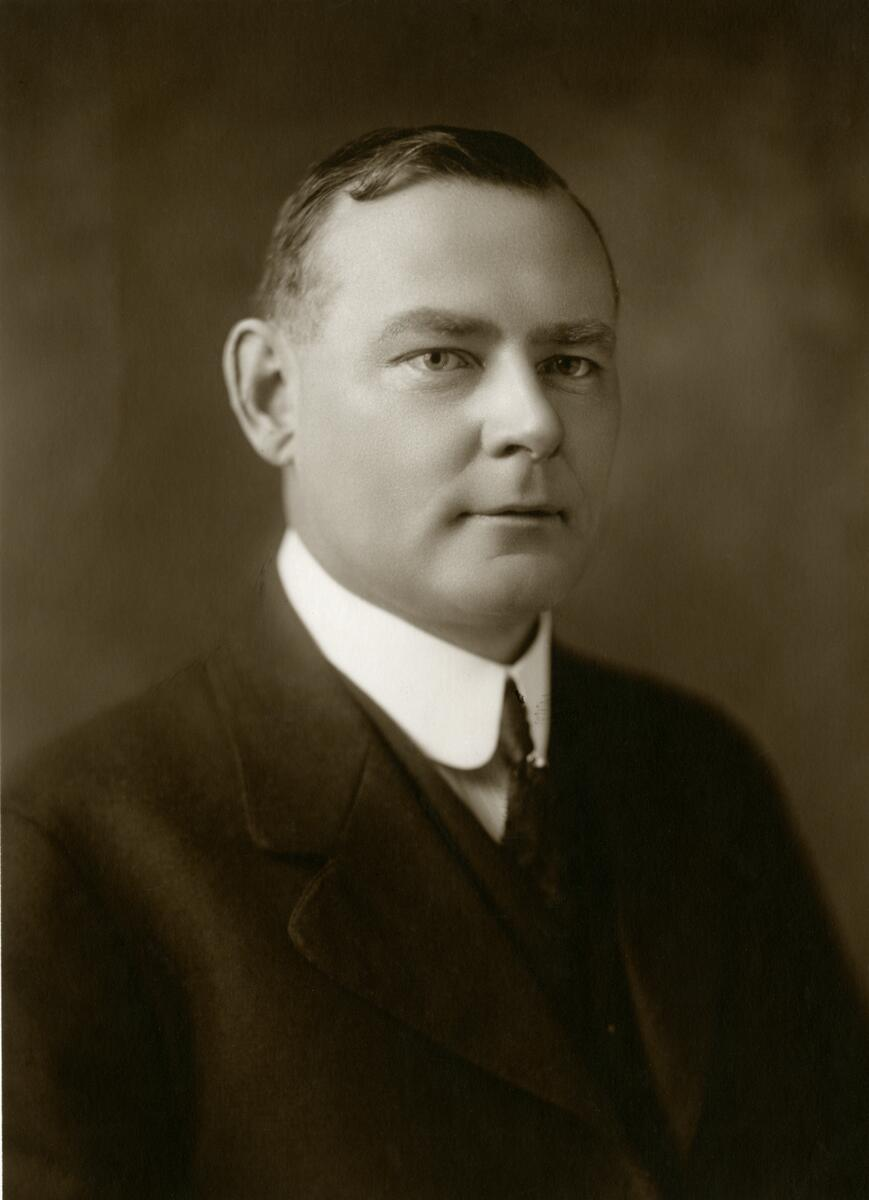

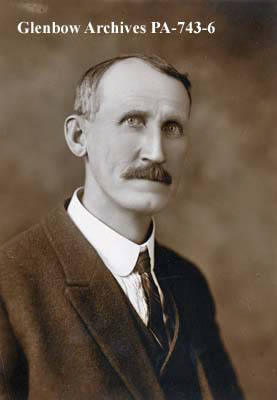

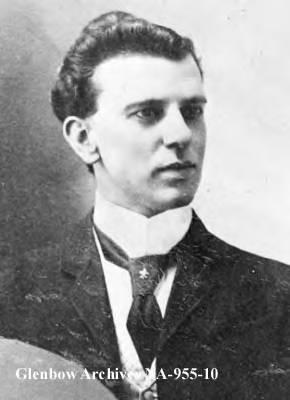
Candidate	Michael Copps Costello	James Abel Hornby	William Thomas Daniel Lathwell
Popular vote	2,159	1,299	1,088
Percentage	47.49%	28.57%	23.93%
Mayor before election
Michael Copps Costello
Elected mayor
Michael Copps Costello

The 1916 Calgary municipal election took place on December 11, 1916 to elect a Mayor to a one-year term and six Aldermen on a two-year term, and two Aldermen for a one-year term, to sit on the thirty-second Calgary City Council. In addition, a Commissioner, four members for the Public School Board, three members for the Separate School Board, two plebiscites on single transferable vote and Daylight Savings were both on the ballot.

The seven elected Aldermen joined Aldermen Samuel Hunter Adams, Robert Colin Marshall, John McNeill, Thomas John Searle Skinner, and George Frederick Tull who were previously elected for two-year terms in 1915 to Calgary City Council.

== Background ==
The election was held under multiple non-transferable vote where each elector was able to cast a ballot for the mayor, commissioner and six ballots for Aldermen who were elected at-large with the city as one large district.

Extension of voting franchise to all residents male or female who are British subjects 21 years of age who have been residents of the city for six months prior to June 1 of the year of a municipal election. This was the first election in Calgary under full franchise.

A one-year Alderman position was opened on Council following Adoniram Judson Samis' resignation to run for Commissioner. The six candidates with the most votes were elected to two year terms, while the next two highest candidates were elected to a single year term.

Mayor Costello and Commissioner Graves were acclaimed upon the close of nominations on December 7, 1915.

== Results ==
=== Mayor ===
Candidate	Votes	Percent
Michael Copps Costello	2,159	
James Abel Hornby	1,299	
William Thomas Daniel Lathwell	1,088	

=== Commissioner ===
Candidate	Votes	Percent
Adoniram Judson Samis	2,266	
James Hay Garden	1,358	
Arthur Walter Ellson Fawkes	902	

=== Councillors ===
Candidate	Votes	Percent
Herbert Bealey Adshead	4,021	
Robert John Tallon	3,895	
Isaac Gideon Ruttle	3,753	
Alexander McTaggart	3,739	
John Sidney Arnold	3,693	
Allan Poyntz Patrick	3,677	
Andrew Graham Broatch (One Year)	3,389	
Manarey	3,038	

== School board trustee ==
=== Public school board ===
Candidate	Votes	Percent
Alex Ross	3,187	
William McCartney Davidson	3,319	
Herbert Arthur Sinnott	2,958	
George William Kerby	2,240	
A. Scott Dawson	2,149	
J. Barnecut	1,974	

=== Separate school board ===
- James Sullivan - Acclaimed
- Peter Collins - Acclaimed
- Francis Joseph Conroy - Acclaimed

== Plebiscite ==
=== Proportional representation ===
Future municipal elections conducted with single transferable vote.

- For - 3,223
- Against - 1,383

=== Daylight savings ===
Daylight savings time.

- For - 1,207
- Against - 3,141

== See also ==
- List of Calgary municipal elections
