= 1914 Calgary municipal election =

Election in Alberta, Canada

← 1913	December 14, 1914	1915 →
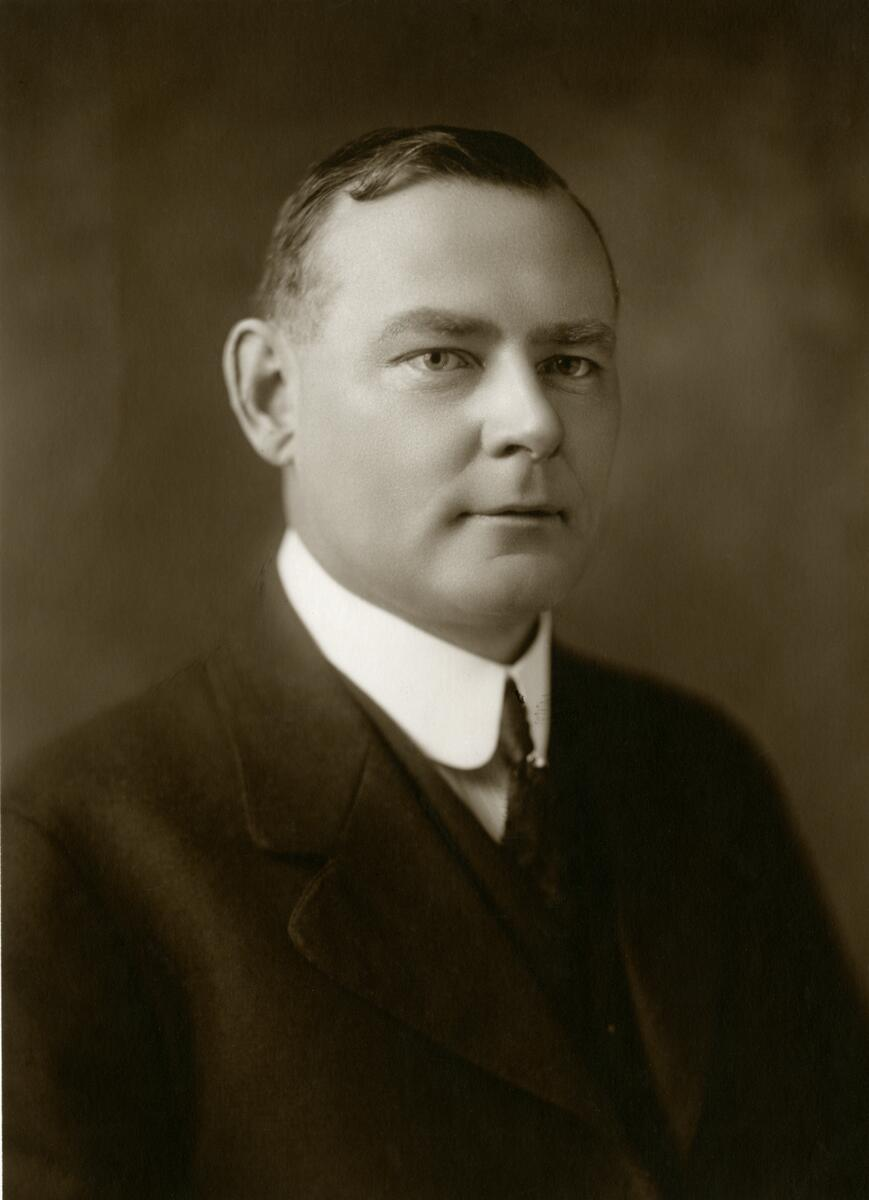
Candidate	Michael Copps Costello	William George Hunt	Alexander Allan
Popular vote	4,019	2,219	820
Percentage	56.94%	31.44%	11.62%
Mayor before election
Herbert Arthur Sinnott
Elected mayor
Michael Copps Costello

The 1914 Calgary municipal election took place on December 14, 1914 to elect a Mayor to a one year term and six Aldermen on a two-year term, to sit on the thirtieth Calgary City Council. Additionally a Commissioner, members for the Public School Board, members for the Separate School Board, two borrowing bylaws and a plebiscite on church taxation were included on the ballot.

There were six Alderman positions contested for a two-year term for the election as Edward Henry Crandell, Harold William Hounsfield Riley, Stanley Gordon Freeze, Thomas Alfred Presswood Frost, and William Ross Sr. were elected for two-year terms in 1913.

== Background ==
The election was held under multiple non-transferable vote where each elector was able to cast a ballot for the mayor, commissioner and six ballots for Aldermen who were elected at-large with the city as one large district. Half of Calgary's twelve Aldermen were elected to two year terms each year.

Three votes on a question were present during the election, two borrowing bylaws to purchase the stockyards for $240,000 and contraction of a Fourth Street West subway below the Canadian Pacific Railway tracks for $195,147 both failed to garner the two-thirds support necessary. A Plebiscite on the taxation of church property failed to garner the required support of half of voters.

Voting franchise was open to all men or women listed on the city's assessment roll with real property valued over $400.

A single one-year alderman position was opened on council following Costello's resignation halfway through his two year term to run for mayor. The one-year alderman term was to be a separate ballot; however, on nomination day on December 7, 1914, Douglas Ralph Crichton was the only candidate to file a nomination for the position. Crichton was subsequently elected by acclamation for the one-year term.

== Results ==
=== Mayor ===
Candidate	Votes	Percent
Michael Copps Costello	4,019	
William George Hunt	2,219	
Alexander Allan	820	

=== Commissioner ===
Candidate	Votes	Percent
James Hay Garden	3,923	
Adoniram Judson Samis	3,057	

=== Councillors ===
Candidate	Votes	Percent
Isaac Gideon Ruttle	4,536	
James Abel Hornby	4,486	
John Leslie Jennison	4,361	
John William Mitchell	4,460	
Arthur Walter Ellson Fawkes	3,977	
John Sidney Arnold	3,820	
George J. Bryan	3,676	
S.J. Blair	2,635	
James Smalley	2,899	
J. Rae	2,772	
Robert John Tallon	2,763	

== School board trustee ==
=== Public school board ===
Candidate	Votes	Percent
John Thomas MacDonald	4,578	
George William Kerby	4,233	
William McCartney Davidson	4,007	
J.H. Birch	3,729	
Alex Ross	3,504	
James A. Walker	2,922	
Robert Eldon Campbell	2,820	
James Short	2,386	
J. Webster	1,432	

=== Separate school board ===
Candidate	Votes	Percent
J.B. Creagon	330	
George Demetrio Venini	235	
F.J. Conroy	182	
G.J. Calhoun		

== Plebiscite ==
=== Stockyard purchase ===
Bylaw proposing to purchase the stockyards for $240,000, requiring two-thirds of eligible voters.

- For - 2,655
- Against - 2,165

=== Fourth street subway ===
Construction of a subway below the Canadian Pacific Railway tracks at Fourth Street West for $195,147, requiring two-thirds of eligible voters.

- For - 2,769
- Against - 2,049

=== Taxation of church property ===
Plebiscite on taxation of church property, requiring a majority of eligible electors.

- For - 2,867
- Against - 3,571

== See also ==
- List of Calgary municipal elections
