= 1915 Calgary municipal election =

Municipal election 1915 in Calgary, Canada

← 1914	December 13, 1915	1916 →
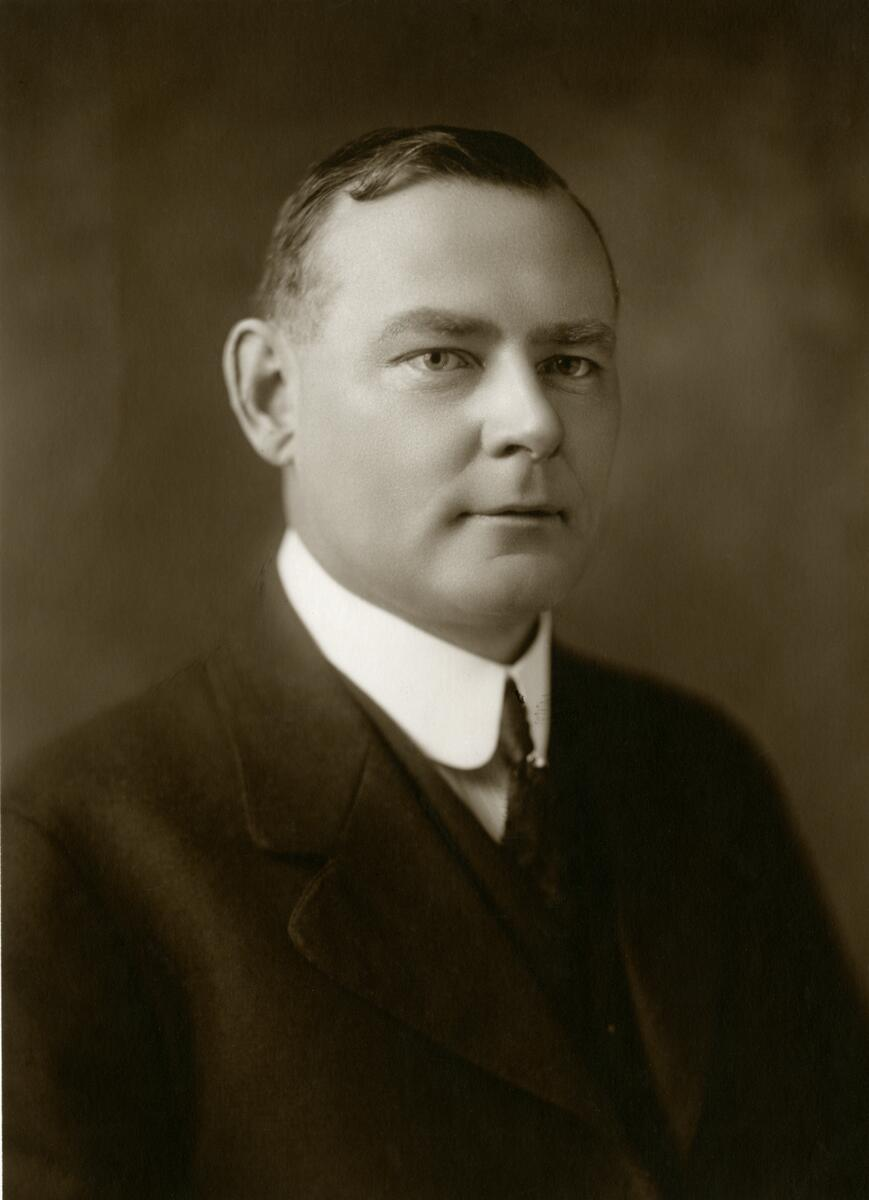
Candidate	Michael Copps Costello
Popular vote	Acclaimed
Mayor before election
Michael Copps Costello
Elected mayor
Michael Copps Costello

The 1915 Calgary municipal election took place on December 13, 1915 to elect a Mayor to a one-year term and six Aldermen on a two-year term, and two Aldermen for a one-year term, to sit on the thirty-first Calgary City Council. In addition, a Commissioner, four members for the Public School Board, three members for the Separate School Board, two plebiscites on daylight saving time and extension of coving franchise both passed.

The eight elected Aldermen joined Aldermen John Sidney Arnold, Arthur Walter Ellson Fawkes, James Abel Hornby, and Isaac Gideon Ruttle who were previously elected for two-year terms in 1914 on Calgary City Council.

== Background ==
The election was held under multiple non-transferable vote where each elector was able to cast a ballot for the mayor, commissioner and six ballots for Aldermen who were elected at-large with the city as one large district.

Voting franchise was open to all men or women listed on the City's assessment roll with real property valued over $400. The 1915 election would be the last municipal election in Calgary requiring property ownership, and was the last without a citizenship requirement.

Two one-year Alderman position was opened on Council following John William Mitchell and John Leslie Jennison resigned during their two year term. The six candidates with the most votes were elected to two year terms, while the next two highest candidates were elected to a single year term.

Mayor Costello and Commissioner Graves were acclaimed upon the close of nominations on December 7, 1915.

== Results ==
=== Mayor ===
- Michael Copps Costello - Acclaimed

=== Commissioner ===
- Arthur Garnet Graves - Acclaimed

=== Councillors ===
Candidate	Votes	Percent
Robert Colin Marshall	2,063	
Adoniram Judson Samis	2,042	
Samuel Hunter Adams	1,832	
John McNeill	1,564	
Thomas John Searle Skinner	1,510	
George Frederick Tull	1,552	
Allan Poyntz Patrick (One Year)	1,489	
Robert John Tallon (One Year)	1,346	
Albert C. Johnston	1,316	
Andrew Graham Broatch	1,130	
A.R. Vince	1,095	
William Guy	987	
Thomas Hart	826	

== School board trustee ==
=== Public school board ===
Candidate	Votes	Percent
Archibald S. Nimmo	1,679	
Annie Graham Foote	1,453	
Joseph Tweed Shaw	1,426	
William Ernest Spankie	1,323	
William George Hunt	1,191	
Thomas H. Crawford	1,168	
Barnecut	887	

=== Separate school board ===
- John Burns - Acclaimed
- John Edward McDonald - Acclaimed
- James L. Tobin - Acclaimed

== Plebiscite ==
=== Franchise extension ===
Extension of voting franchise to all residents male or female who are British subjects 21 years of age who have been residents of the city for six months prior to June 1 of the year of a municipal election.

- For - 1,519
- Against - 361

=== Daylight saving ===
Daylight saving time.

- For - 1,334
- Against - 1,007

== See also ==
- List of Calgary municipal elections
