= 1918 Calgary municipal election =

Election in Alberta, Canada

← 1917	December 9, 1918	1919 →
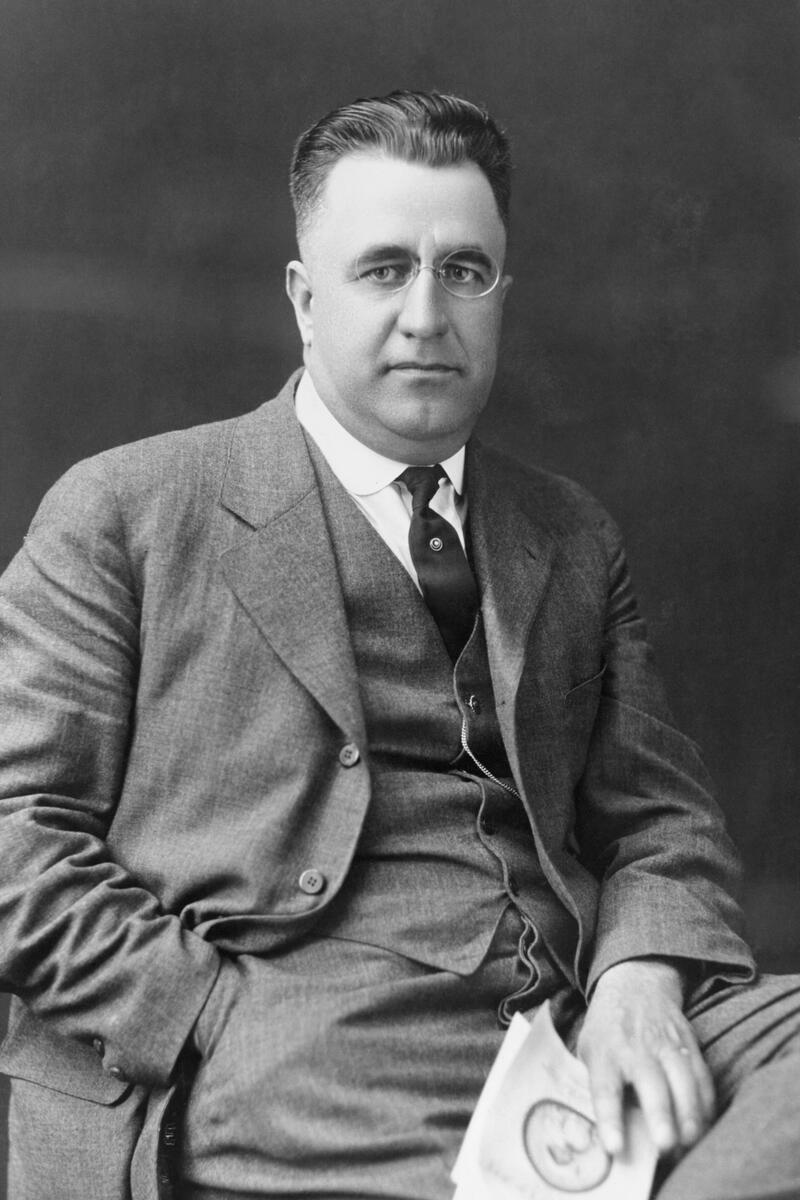

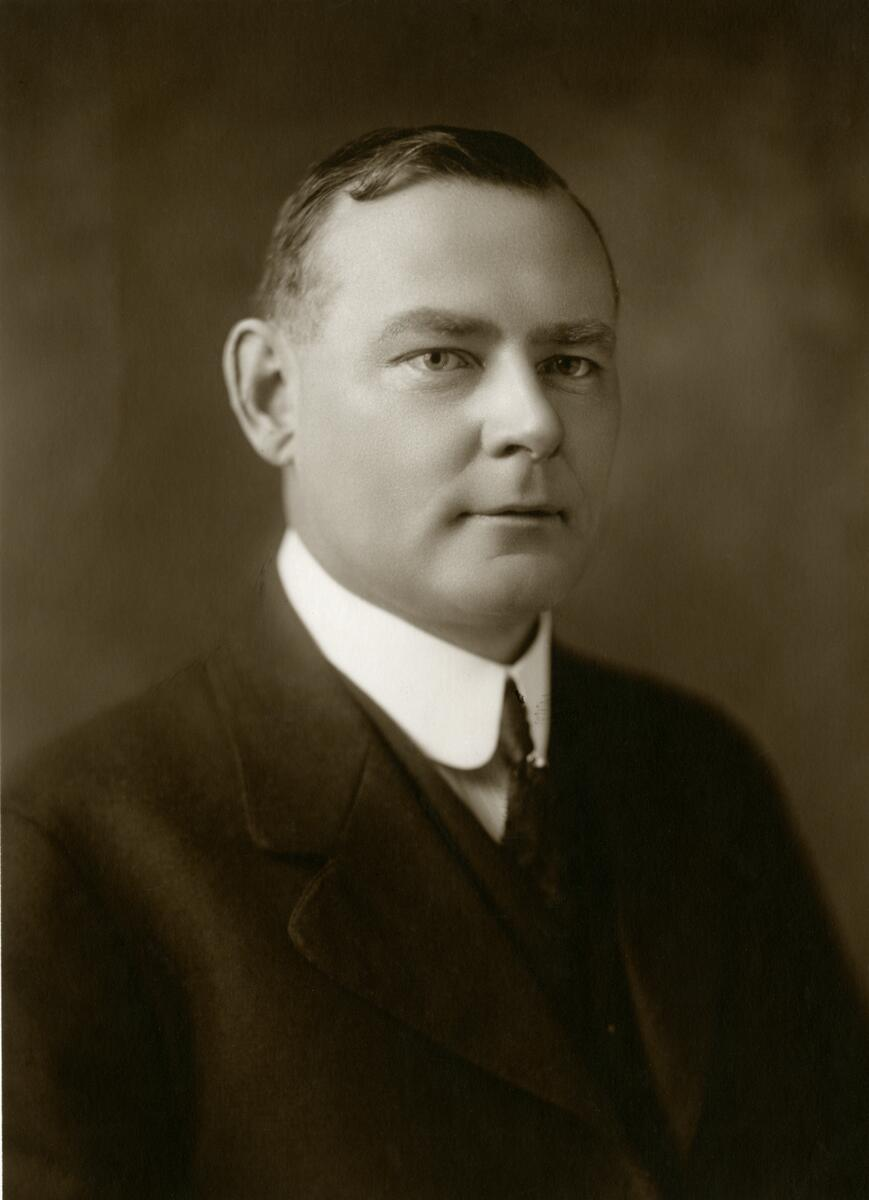
Candidate	Robert Colin Marshall	Michael Copps Costello
Popular vote	3,428	3,234
Percentage	51.46%	48.54%
Mayor before election
Michael Copps Costello
Elected mayor
Robert Colin Marshall

The 1918 Calgary municipal election was held on December 9, 1918, to a Mayor and six Aldermen to sit on Calgary City Council. Additionally a Commissioner, three members for the Public School Board were elected.

There were twelve aldermen on city council, but five of the positions were already filled: Samuel Hunter Adams, Andrew Graham Broatch, Frank Roy Freeze, Annie Gale, and Albert Mahaffy were all elected to two-year terms in 1917 and were still in office. Robert Colin Marshall was elected as an Alderman in 1917 for a two-year term, but resigned to run for mayor.

A number of plebiscites were held, all requiring a majority to pass.

The election was held under the Single Transferable Voting/Proportional Representation (STV/PR) with the term for Alderman being two years and the Mayor being one year. The Alderman seat vacated by Marshall would be held by the 7th-place finisher in the election for a period of one year.

== Background ==
The election would take place during the 1918 influenza pandemic which was first reported in Calgary two months before the election on October 3, 1918, by 15 soldiers returning to Canada from the First World War. By November 30, 1918, the pandemic had effected almost every Alberta community with more than 26,000 cases.

The Calgary Daily Herald would also set a "brilliant colored" flare above the Herald Building to announce the elected mayor, red should Marshall win and yellow should Costello be elected.

This would be the second municipal election held with the proportional vote system in Calgary, and there was an expectation there would be several invalid ballots due to electors marking preference with an "x" rather than numerically by preference. However, there would be far fewer spoiled ballots in the 1918 election then the 1917 election. Following the election the editors of the Calgary Daily Herald would comment on "carelessness" in the preparation of voters' lists which left many people without the ability to vote, stating "An inaccurate voters' list is almost worse than none at all".

== Results ==
=== Mayor ===
1918 Calgary municipal election: Mayor
Party	Candidate	Votes	%	Elected
-	Robert Colin Marshall	3,428	51.46%	✓
-	Michael Copps Costello	3,234	48.54%	
Total valid votes		6,662	-	

=== Council ===
1918 Calgary municipal election: Council
Party	Candidate	1st Preference	%	Count	Term length	Elected
-	David Ernest Black	1,542	23.99%	1st	2 years	✓
-	Jack McCoubrey	844	13.13%	1st	2 years	✓
-	Fred J. White	651	10.13%	8th	2 years	✓
-	Issac G. Ruttle	496	7.72%	13th	1 years	✓
-	Frederick Arthur Johnston	476	7.41%	7th	2 years	✓
-	Frederick Ernest Osborne	455	7.08%	12th	2 years	✓
-	Alexander McTaggart	424	6.60%	13th	2 years	✓
-	Dr. Leslie Wright	354	5.51%			
-	R. Jeff Lydiatt	307	4.78%			
-	T. McLaughlin	260	4.05%			
-	Wm. Groves	244	3.80%			
-	Ed Geehan	222	3.45%			
-	James Pettigrew	77	1.20%			
-	J. W. McDonald	75	1.17%			
Total valid votes		8,427	-	-		
Source(s) The election was held under the Single Transferable Voting/Proportional Representation (STV/PR). Totals above are first preference votes. The quota necessary to be elected was 804.

=== Commissioner ===
1918 Calgary municipal election: Commissioner
Party	Candidate	Votes	%	Elected
-	A. J. Samis	4,630	70.85%	✓
-	A. W. E. Fawkes	1,905	29.15%	
Total valid votes		6,535	-	

=== Public School Board ===
Quota necessary for election was 1,512.

Party	Candidate	1st Preference	%	Count	Elected
-	Herbert Arthur Sinnott	1,467	X%	2nd	✓
-	G. S. Corse	1,047	X%	2nd	✓
-	L. L. Johnson	953	X%	X	✓
-	Melvin M. Downey	787	X%		
-	T. Humphries	X	X%		
-	D. J. Young	X	X%		
-	Robert H. Parkyn	X	X%		
-	Walter Smitten	X	X%		
Total valid votes		X	-		

=== Hospital Board ===
The quota was 544 votes.

Party	Candidate	1st Preference	%	Count	Elected
-	C. F. Adams	930	24.95%	1st	✓
-	S. S. Savage	528	14.17%	2nd	✓
-	D. Ormond	313	8.40%	7th	✓
-	Mrs. F. A. Davis	413	11.08%	7th	✓
-	H. T. Whittemore	334	8.96%	9th	✓
-	D. D. Davidson	248	6.65%	9th	✓
-	G. T. C. Robinson	313	8.40%		
-	J. R. Harris	248	6.65%		
-	John Harrison	169	4.53%		
-	W. C. McPhee	133	3.57%		
-	James Petrie	98	2.63%		
Total valid votes		3,727	-	-	

== See also ==
- List of Calgary municipal elections

== Sources ==
- Frederick Hunter: THE MAYORS AND COUNCILS OF THE CORPORATION OF CALGARY Archived March 3, 2020
