= 1913 Calgary municipal election =

Election in Alberta, Canada

- December 8, 1913
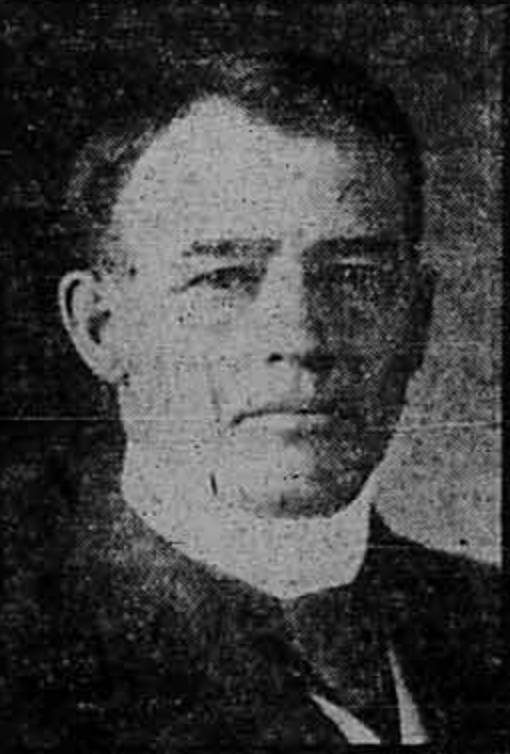
Candidate	Herbert Arthur Sinnott
Popular vote	Acclaimed
Mayor before election
Herbert Arthur Sinnott
Elected mayor
Herbert Arthur Sinnott

The 1913 Calgary municipal election took place on December 8, 1913 to elect a Mayor and twelve Aldermen to sit on the twenty-ninth Calgary City Council from January 2, 1914 to January 2, 1915. Additionally a Commissioner, two trustees for the Public School Board, three trustees for the Separate School Board, two bylaws regarding the term and remuneration of Aldermen and a plebislicte on whether to donate the Mewata Park to the Dominion Government for the site of the Mewata Armouries was included on the ballot.

Incumbent Mayor Herbert Arthur Sinnott was elected by acclimation on the close of nominations on December 1, 1913.

== Background ==
The election was held under multiple non-transferable vote where each elector was able to cast a ballot for the mayor, commissioner and 12 for Aldermen who were elected at-large with the city as one large district. Starting in the 1913 election Aldermen were elected to two year terms, with half of council's term expiring each year. To facilitate this change the six candidates with the most votes were elected to Council for a two-year term, and the next six candidates were elected to a one-year term.

=== Mewata Armouries ===
The 1911 Canadian federal election, the previous Liberal government under Wilfrid Laurier was toppled by Robert Borden's Conservative Party. Sam Hughes was appointed Minister of Militia and Defence and together Borden and Hughes sought to expand the role and prominence of militias in Canada. By December 1911, Borden had won over Hughes and Frederick Debartzch Monk Minister of Public Works to fund a $250,000 "Western Armoury". In January 1912, Hughes announced in Parliament "towns making offers of valuable sites were most likely to receive favorable consideration of the government." The City of Calgary's land offer valued at approximately $100,000, and in June 1912, the federal government approved $50,000 for the Calgary project.

Mewata Park, originally a federal reserve which was transferred to the City of Calgary as a park in 1906 was chosen for the site. The area was between the city's downtown and growing residential neighbourhoods. Calgary officials expected the federal government to transfer the military's old Calgary Rifle Range in exchange for the Mewata land, however despite correspondence from the city to Borden about the trade, Borden did not press the issue in Ottawa.

In 1913, Borden wrote the city, pressing the issue of the federal government obtaining the Mewata Park land stating:

All Cities are now supplying sites for armories. Calgary offered a site near the old hospital building. It is very unsuitable. If Calgary wants a $50,000 building it can get it by not providing a decent site. If, on the other hand Mewata Park is available, Calgary will obtain an armory that will be second to none in Western Canada.

By 1913 the Mewata Park land had become a civic issue in Calgary, opposed by labour groups which had previously seen the federal government use militia to crush strikes in Cape Breton and Vancouver Island. Calgary Mayor Herbert Arthur Sinnott was reluctant to give away the Mewata Park land, but still sought the construction of an armory. Compounding the issue was the 1902 Crown grant for the Mewata land which stipulated the property must be used for "purposes of a public park and for no other purpose". Eventually Calgary City Council passed a motion for administration to transfer the Mewata land to the federal government, which was strongly opposed by many Calgarians, and the City requested the Legislative Assembly pass a private bill for the purpose of enabling the transfer which was overwhelming defeated by the majority Liberal provincial government. Eventually a plebiscite was held alongside the 1913 Calgary municipal election in which the electorate was asked whether to transfer "a small portion of Mewata Park of approximately 90,000 square feet", in which more than 70% of ratepayers voted in favor of transferring the land. Bennett later respond to Sinnott and the plebiscite noting the total area provided was approximately 10,000 square feet too small, Bennett proposed a solution where the city transferred the full property as requested and the federal government issued an Order in Council absolving the city of any liability in regards to the letters patent.

== Results ==
=== Mayor ===
- Herbert Arthur Sinnott - Acclaimed

=== Commissioner ===
Candidate	Votes	Percent
Arthur Garnet Graves	3,453	
William Henry Manarey	1,642	
Robert Knight	79	

=== Councillors ===
Candidate	Votes	Percent
Stanley Gordon Freeze	4,424	
Harold William Hounsfield Riley	4,100	
Edward Henry Crandell	4,045	
Michael Copps Costello	3,997	
William Ross Sr.	3,755	
Thomas Alfred Presswood Frost	3,471	
George William Hunt	3,429	
William John Tregillus	3,322	
Isaac Gideon Ruttle	3,258	
Herbert Bealey Adshead	3,242	
Douglas Ralph Crichton	3,149	
Donald Hope	2,489	
Richard Addison Brocklebank	2,386	
A.H. Living	2,373	
J. Tait Hunter	2,179	
Samuel Allen Carson	2,154	
H.T. Jarrett	1,889	
E.D. Benson	1,770	
N.P.P. Pallesen	1,719	
Stanley Brown Ramsey	1,546	
P.J. McRohan	1,422	
William McSpadden	977	
Walter Hallett	975	

== School board trustee ==
=== Public school board ===
Candidate	Votes	Percent
Annie G. Foote		
John C. McNeill		
James A. Walker		
A.C. Newcombe		

=== Separate school board ===
Candidate	Votes	Percent
John Burns		
James L. Tobin		
John Edward MacDonald		
George Demetrio Venini		

== Plebiscite ==
=== Mewata Park Bylaw ===
To donate the Mewata Park to the Dominion Government for the site of the Mewata Armouries.

- For - 3,664
- Against - 1,438

=== Payment of Aldermen bylaw ===
- For - 1,800
- Against - 3,199

=== Two-Year term for Aldermen ===
- For - 2,921
- Against - 2,117

== See also ==
- List of Calgary municipal elections
