= 1924 Calgary municipal election =

Election in Alberta, Canada

- December 10, 1924
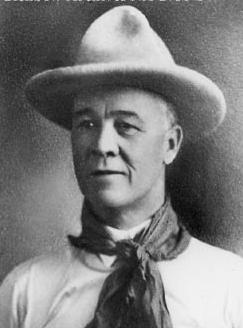
| Candidate | George Harry Webster |
| Popular vote | Serving second year of two year term |
Elected Council
TBD

The 1924 Calgary municipal election was held on December 10, 1924 to elect six aldermen to sit on Calgary City Council.

Calgary City Council had twelve at-large aldermen on city council, but six of the positions were already filled: Andrew Davison, Thomas Alexander Hornibrook, Walter Little, William Henry Ross, Samuel Stanley Savage, and Robert Cadogan Thomas, were all elected to two-year terms in 1923 and were still in office. Mayor George Harry Webster had previously been elected to a two-year term in the 1923 election.

Plebiscites held required a two-thirds majority to pass.

The election was held under the Single Transferable Voting/Proportional Representation (STV/PR) with the term for Alderman being two years.

== Results ==
=== Councillor contest ===
- Peter Turner Bone elected
- Thomas Henry Crawford elected
- Eneas Edward McCormick elected
- John Walker Russell elected
- Ruben Weldon Ward elected
- Frederick James White Labour elected

(unsuccessful candidates not listed)

== See also ==
- List of Calgary municipal elections

== Sources ==
- Frederick Hunter: THE MAYORS AND COUNCILS OF THE CORPORATION OF CALGARY Archived March 3, 2020
