= Bishop McNally High School =

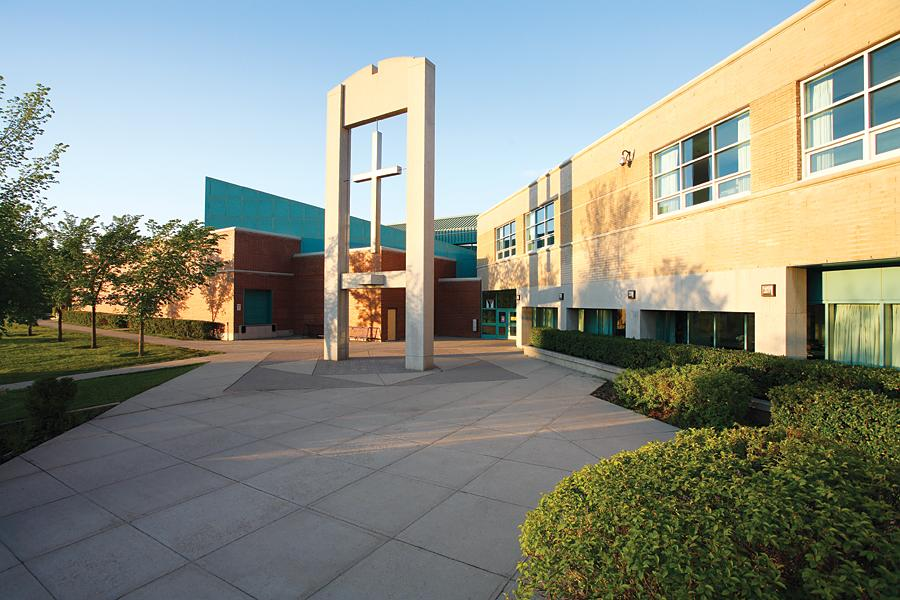

Location
- 5700 Falconridge Blvd. NE; Calgary, Alberta; Canada; 51.103°N 113.954°W

Information
- School type: Separate secondary
- Religious affiliation: Roman Catholic
- Established: 1994
- School board: Calgary Catholic School District
- Principal: Bradley Sanesh
- Staff: 104
- Grades: 10 - 12
- Enrollment: 1300
- Language: English, Extended French and Spanish
- Colours: Teal, White, and Black
- Mascot: Timmy the Timberwolf
- Team name: Timberwolves
- Website: bishopmcnally.cssd.ab.ca

Bishop McNally High School is a part of the Calgary Catholic School District in Calgary, Alberta, Canada. The school is named after John Thomas McNally, founder of the diocese who was appointed Bishop of Calgary from 1913 to 1924.

== Academics ==
The school offers Advanced Placement classes in Art, Biology, Calculus, English, Social Studies, Mathematics, Science, French, Religion, Chemistry, and Physics. French speaking students have the choice of taking the Extended French Program. Other modern languages as well are provided at the school including French Second Language (FSL) and Spanish. Students may choose to take the modern languages at a 10, 20, and 30 level.

The school is part of the Action for Bright Children Society.

== Fine Arts ==
The school provides a prestigious range of fine arts courses. Students have a choice of taking any of their preferred courses in which are offered by the school. The courses of Art (which is also offered in Advanced Placement), Dance, Drama, Music and Technical Theatre are provided. The classes are course credit classes, and can be taken in either 3 credit or 5 credit.

== YMCA Bishop McNally ==
The YMCA had formed a partnership with Bishop McNally allowing students the opportunity to sign up for a membership as well as offering existing YMCA members access to a variety of physical fitness facilities. The services are open to the public after school hours during the week and during the day each Saturday. However, a recent decision by the YMCA will mean the closure of their programmes and the ending of their relationship with the High School from 21 December 2007. Facilities for the community will continue to exist, managed by the High School.

== Youth Volunteer Corps ==
As part of The YVC Clubs in Schools program, a sub-program of Child and Youth Friendly Calgary, Bishop McNally High School encourages students to attend weekly meetings focused on the creation of in-school volunteer activities.

== Notable alumni ==
- Kwadwo Boahen, CFL player
- Lance Milton, former CFL player^{[5]}
