= St Martin de Porres High School (Airdrie, Alberta) =

Location
- 410 Yankee Valley Boulevard; Airdrie, Alberta, T4B 2M1; Canada; 51.271091°N 114.01365°W

Information
- School type: Junior High/High School
- Religious affiliation: Roman Catholic
- Founded: 1998
- School board: Calgary Catholic School District
- Principal: Michaela Hashiguchi
- Grades: 10-12
- Enrollment: 700
- Language: English and Extended French
- Colours: Navy and Grey
- Team name: Kodiaks
- Website: www.cssd.ab.ca/schools/stmartin/Pages/default.aspx

St. Martin De Porres High School is a Roman Catholic high school located in the city of Airdrie, Alberta. The Calgary Catholic School District serves as its administrative school board.

== History ==
The school was originally built in 1998 with portables units on site.

The school's name and patron saint is St. Martin de Porres.

== Academics ==
The school offers English Language Learning (ELL), French Immersion, and Extended French programs.

== Athletics ==
The St Martin De Porres Kodiaks compete as a part of the Division III in the Calgary Senior High School Athletic Association. The school participates in sports such as badminton, basketball, football, senior cross country, soccer, swimming, and volleyball.
