= Kwadwo Boahen =

Canadian football player (born 2000)

Profile
- Position: Defensive lineman

Personal information
- Born: December 18, 2000 (age 25); Calgary, Alberta, Canada
- Listed height: 6 ft 1 in (1.85 m)
- Listed weight: 285 lb (129 kg)

Career information
- High school: Bishop McNally (Calgary Alberta)
- University: York, Alberta
- CFL draft: 2023: 3rd round, 22nd overall pick

Career history
- 2023: Calgary Stampeders*
- 2024: Calgary Stampeders
- * Offseason or practice squad member only
- Stats at CFL.ca

Kwadwo Boahen (born December 18, 2000) is a Canadian professional football defensive linemen. He played U Sports football at York and Alberta. He has been a member of the Calgary Stampeders of the Canadian Football League (CFL).

== Early life ==
Boahen attended Bishop McNally High School in Calgary.

== University career ==
Boahen first played U Sports football for the York Lions from 2018 to 2021. He played in seven games his freshman year in 2018, recording nine tackles and 0.5 sacks while earning OUA All-Rookie honors. He started all eight games during the 2019 season, totaling 24.5 tackles, 2.5 sacks, one pass breakup and one forced fumble. The 2020 U Sports football season was cancelled due to the COVID-19 pandemic. Boahen started all six of the team's games in 2021, accumulating 22.5 tackles and two sacks.

He transferred to play for the Alberta Golden Bears in 2022, recording 21 tackles, one sack, and one pass breakup.

Boahen was selected by the Calgary Stampeders of the Canadian Football League (CFL) in the third round, with the 22nd overall pick, of the 2023 CFL draft. He officially signed with the team on May 5, 2023. He was moved to the practice roster on June 3. Boehen was later released from the practice roster, and then returned to Alberta for another season of U Sports football. He accumulated 12 tackles, 2.5 sacks, one forced fumble, one pass breakup, and one blocked kick in five games for the Golden Bears in 2023.

== Professional career ==
Pre-draft measurables
Height	Weight	40-yard dash	20-yard shuttle	Three-cone drill	Vertical jump	Broad jump	Bench press
6 ft 0 1/2 in (1.84 m)	278 lb (126 kg)	5.12 s	4.50 s	7.88 s	31.0 in (0.79 m)	8 ft 10 in (2.69 m)	21 reps
All values from CFL Combine

After the end of the 2023 U Sports football season, Boahen signed with the Stampeders again on November 20, 2023. He was placed on the one-game injured list on June 28, 2024, placed on the six-game injured list on July 5, activated on August 14, and placed on the six-game injured list again on September 1, 2024. Overall, Boahen dressed in three games for the Stampeders during the 2024 season, posting one tackle on defense. He was released on May 14, 2025.
