= St. Anne Academic Centre (Calgary) =

Location
- 1010 21st Ave Se; Calgary, Alberta, T2G 1N2; Canada; 51.034692°N 114.03887°W

Information
- School type: High School
- Religious affiliation: Roman Catholic
- Founded: 1916
- School board: Calgary Catholic School District
- Principal: Steve Petingola
- Grades: K-12
- Enrollment: 500
- Language: English
- Colours: Blue, White, and Yellow
- Website: www.cssd.ab.ca/schools/stanne/Pages/default.aspx

St. Anne Academic Centre is a Roman Catholic school located in the community of Ramsay in the city of Calgary, Alberta. The school is operated the jurisdiction of the Calgary Catholic School District.

== History ==
The school has been serving students since the mid 1910s. The Sisters of St. Joseph from Peterborough, Ontario moved to Calgary to teach at St Anne's & Sacred Heart elementary.

Throughout the years, as the city of Calgary grew, the facilities couldn't sustain a full operating kindergarten to grade twelve, and grew to evolve to its current educational focus.

The school is named and its patron saint is St Anne.

== Academics ==
The core of its educational studies are directed and focused toward students under the age of twenty wishing to continue their scholarly pursuits.

The school has designed programs for grade one to grade twelve students wishing to study from home. Independent study programs and correspondence through Alberta Distance Learning Centre courses are also available at St Anne's.
