= Lance Milton =

Canadian football player (born 1987)

No. 24, 37
- Position: Defensive back

Personal information
- Born: March 4, 1987 (age 39); Calgary, Alberta, Canada
- Listed height: 5 ft 11 in (1.80 m)
- Listed weight: 175 lb (79 kg)

Career information
- High school: Bishop McNally (AB)
- University: UBC
- CFL draft: 2012: 4th round, 26thth overall pick

Career history
- 2012: Montreal Alouettes
- 2013: Toronto Argonauts

Lance Milton (born March 4, 1987) is a Canadian former professional football defensive back who played two seasons in the Canadian Football League (CFL) for the Montreal Alouettes and Toronto Argonauts. He played college football for UBC and was selected in the 4th round (26th overall) of the 2012 CFL draft.

== Early life and education ==
Milton was born on March 4, 1987, in Calgary, Alberta. He attended Bishop McNally High School there before attending University of British Columbia.

== Professional career ==
Following his graduation from college, Milton was selected in the 4th round (26th overall) of the 2012 CFL draft by the Montreal Alouettes. He signed his rookie contract in May 2012. In his first season, Milton appeared in seven games at the cornerback position, making one tackle. He was released after one season, and later signed to the practice roster of the Toronto Argonauts. He was promoted for one game, making one tackle. He retired after the season.
