= St. Mary's High School (Calgary) =

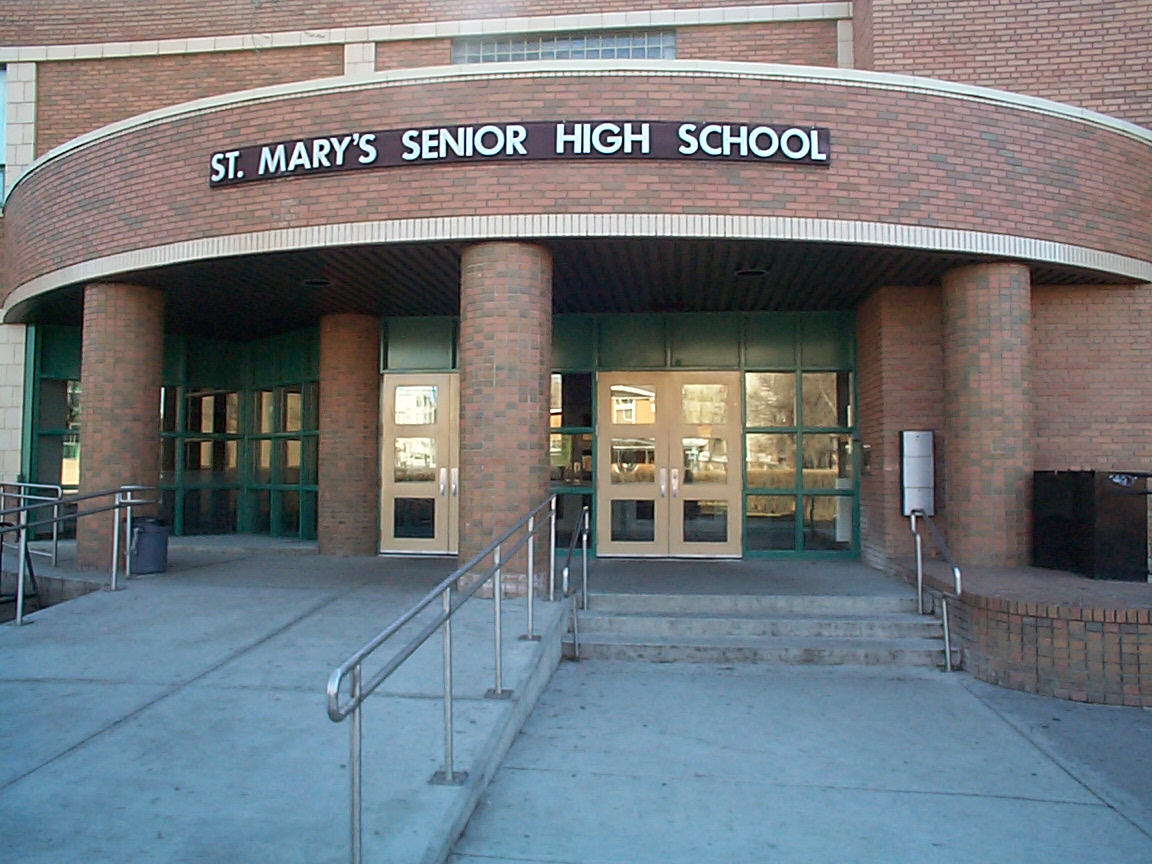
- St. Mary's High School in 2005

Location
- 111 – 18 Avenue SW; Calgary, Alberta, T2S 0B8; Canada; 51.03662°N 114.06395°W

Information
- Motto: Latin: Bonitatem et Disciplinam et Scientam Doce Me (Teach Me Goodness, Discipline and Knowledge)
- Religious affiliations: Roman Catholic (Faithful Companions of Jesus) (School Sisters of Notre Dame)
- Founded: 1885
- School board: Calgary Catholic School District
- Superintendent: Bryan Szumlas
- Principal: Greg Masteron
- Grades: 10–12
- Language: English, French
- Colours: Green and White
- Mascot: Halo
- Team name: Saints
- Newspaper: The Torch
- Affiliations: International Baccalaureate, Extended French, Collegiate Program
- Website: www.cssd.ab.ca/stmarys

St. Mary's High School is a secondary school in Calgary, Alberta, Canada. It is operated by the Calgary Catholic School District (CCSD). The school is well known in Calgary for its historical significance. It attracts significant numbers of students from throughout the city, even those closer to other Catholic high schools, who wish to take advantage of programs not offered in their local high school. Also, for some, it is a tradition to attend the same school as their parents and grandparents.

== History ==
St. Mary's is the oldest school in Calgary that is still in operation (the school, not the current building, which is relatively new). It was the first Catholic school, in what's now Alberta, to receive full public financial support. The history of St. Mary's School is a major part of the history of publicly funded Catholic education in the Calgary area.

1820	A group of Catholic Sisters, Faithful Companions of Jesus, was founded in Amiens, France. Its mission included the founding of institutes of education for children.
1884	Calgary was incorporated as a town in what was then the Northwest Territories
1885	District founding: The Lacombe Separate School District #1 was created by the government of the Northwest Territories to provide education up to grade 12 for the Catholic population in Calgary and the surrounding area. This was the start of public funding for Catholic education in the region. The district received funding from the territorial government (later the provincial government) and was granted authority to raise funds through property taxes. However, particularly in the early days of the system, the Church and voluntary contributions (of money and land), played a key role in providing education in the area. School founding: The first St. Mary's School was opened by the Faithful Companions of Jesus, led by Mother Mary Greene. Initially, the school used shared facilities in the existing two-storey log cabin convent of the Sisters. It was located on land granted by the well known missionary Father Albert Lacombe, who lent his newly built mission and surrounding area on St. Mary Street in the francophone village of Rouleauville. That location later became known as 19 Avenue S.W., Calgary. The town of Calgary was where the largest number of students came from. The elected trustees of the district were ultimately responsible for and in charge of St. Mary's School, which served as the heart of the district throughout its early history. Initially St. Mary's School taught grades one through twelve to children in Rouleauville, Calgary, and other nearby communities.
1893	The Sacred Heart Convent building was completed, and St. Mary's School was moved out of the log cabin, and into the new convent.
1894	Calgary becomes the first city in the North West Territories, but hasn't yet expanded to include St. Mary's.
1905	Alberta becomes a province, separating from the North West Territories. The province continued the practice of public support for Catholic education, that predated it.
1907	Rouleauville (which included St. Mary's at the time) was annexed by Calgary. The area becomes known as the Mission District of Calgary. St. Mary's Street became 19 Avenue SW, as various street names were eliminated to conform to Calgary naming/number system for roads.

=== 1909–1956 ===
With the construction of a new building, St. Mary's serves as the hub of the district for decades (even with new schools built). Throughout much of this time, the number of young families in the area continues to grow (tapering off later on).

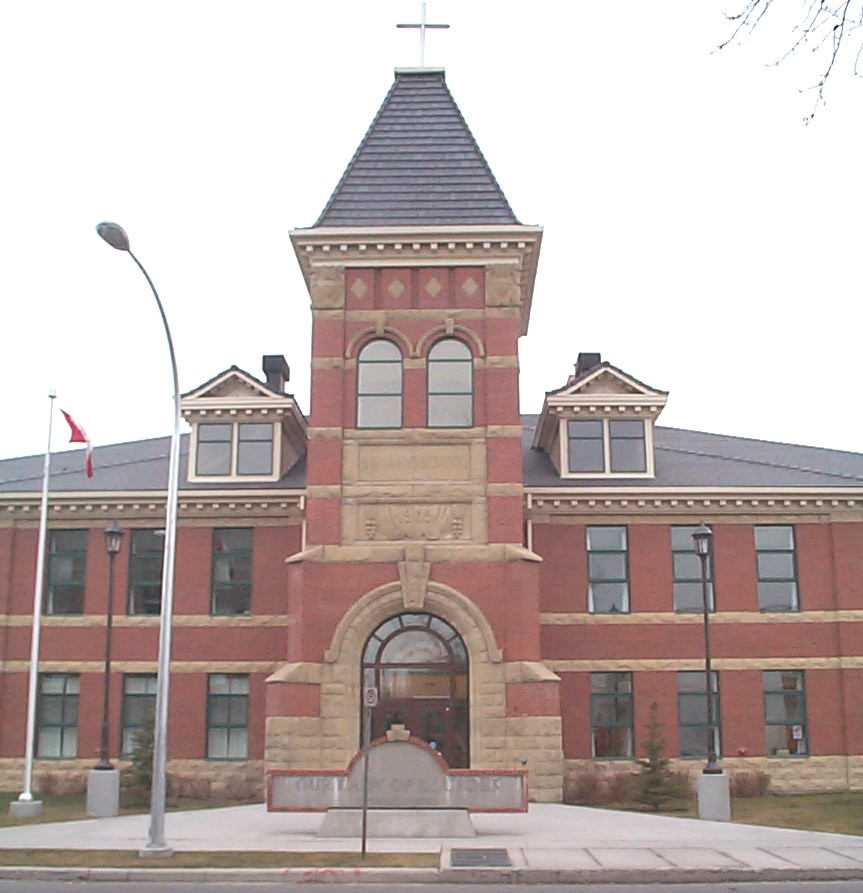
The red sandstone facade of the 1909 St. Mary's building was re-used in this school (Our Lady of Lourdes), opened 2005.

1909	A new St. Mary's School building was built at 1912 – 2nd Street S.W. This was the first building dedicated exclusively to the school. This is the most famous of the buildings used by the school throughout its history. It was built of red brick and sandstone (sandstone typified such buildings in Calgary at the time).
1910	The new (1909) building opens to students, which becomes the sole building used for classes (ending use of the convent). The school employs nine teachers who teach grades one through twelve. This is the only building used for Catholic schooling in Calgary.
1911	The province of Alberta, renamed The Lacombe Separate School District #1 to be the Calgary Roman Catholic School District #1 (who simply call themselves the Calgary Catholic School District).
1918	Senior boys' classes are moved to the newly created St. Mary's College for Boys (in this case the word college means secondary school) nearby. Younger boys remained at the existing 1909 building. However, since most remaining students were female, the 1909 building became known as St. Mary's Girls School from this point on.
1918–1919	The global outbreak of the Spanish flu forced the temporary closure of this and many other schools.
1924	The head offices of the school district were located St. Mary's Girls School (the 1909 building)
1952	While continuing to be significant, St. Mary's progressively becomes less and less central to the Catholic system in Calgary. A sign of this is when the head offices of the school district are moved out of the school to a more central location.

=== 1957 – present ===
In modern times St. Mary's no longer plays a central role in the district. The number of young families in the area declines (as they move to suburbs) and school progressively relies more on students coming from across the city (outside the immediate area).

1957–1958	St. Mary's Boys' School was built on 111 – 18 Avenue S.W, which takes all St. Mary's male students, leaving the 1909 building (St. Mary's Girls' School) exclusively female in all grades for the first time.
1959	With the construction of new elementary and junior high schools in Calgary, St. Mary's (in both buildings) is changed to only provides instruction in grades 9–12.
1969	St. Mary's Boys’ School was expanded, to allow it to become coeducational. Classes were moved from St. Mary's Girls' School to St. Mary's Boys’ School; making a single coeducational facility. St. Mary's Boys’ School was renamed St. Mary's High School School and remained the permanent home of the school at 111 – 18 Avenue S.W..
1970	The 1909 building permanently ceases use as a senior high school. It is converted into a junior high, which was named St. Martin de Porres (the same name was also used for a different school built in Airdrie by the same district).
1979	The building built in 1909 ceased functioning as a school altogether, and was turned into a Catholic Pastoral Centre and Daycare. St. Martin de Porres Junior High School was relocated to
1995	The building built in 1909 was shut down completely, and left permanently unused.
2002	The old 1909 building is demolished after great controversy and efforts to save it.
2005	A new school called Our Lady of Lourdes (not part of St. Mary's High School) is opened on the grounds of the old 1909 building, The new building used much of the facade the old 1909 building, including the engraving of "St. Mary's School" on the entrance. However, the new school has an entirely new interior. Also, it is operated as a distinct school apart from St. Mary's High School nearby.
2013	The school suffered extensive damage from the 2013 Calgary Floods. The impact of the flood was localized in the basement of the school with many classrooms and labs left in ruin.
2025	Renovated front office and added new Collegiate Program area.

St. Mary's High School at the 111 – 18 Avenue S.W. location remains an active senior high school, teaching grades ten to twelve. Generally, students from all the "St Mary's" school buildings, are considered alumni of the school, which is seen as a single historical institution, which happened to have multiple buildings over time.

== Special programs ==
- St. Mary's High School is one of a small number of Calgary high schools to offer an International Baccalaureate (IB) Diploma Programme, which it started in 1986.
- St. Mary's High School provides an experiential hands-on learning program to explore careers outside the traditional classroom, called the Collegiate Program, started in late 2025.

== Sports ==
Extracurricular sports:

- Team sports: Football, Basketball, Volleyball, Soccer, Field hockey and Rugby.
- Individual sports: Badminton, Track and field, Cross country and Swimming/Diving.

== See also ==
- St. Mary's Cathedral – Located near the school.
- Western Canada High School – The closest public high school.
