= Herbert Bealey Adshead =

Canadian politician

Member of the Canadian Parliament for Calgary East
- In office 1926–1930
- Preceded by: Fred Davis
- Succeeded by: George Douglas Stanley

Personal details
- Born: October 17, 1862 Manchester, England
- Died: May 2, 1932 (aged 69)
- Party: Labour

Herbert Bealey Adshead (October 17, 1862 – May 2, 1932) was a farmer, author and a municipal and federal level politician from Canada.

== Early life ==
Herbert Besley Adshead was born on October 17, 1862, just outside Manchester, England. He emigrated to Canada in 1880 at the age of 16. He first settled in Kingston, Ontario. Adshead graduated from Normal School in 1897. He married and moved west with his wife, Ellen Unwin. The couple would settle creating a homestead near Olds, Alberta. They moved to Calgary, Alberta, in 1912.

== Political career ==
Adshead began his political career on the municipal level. He was elected to Calgary City Council in the 1912 municipal election and served two consecutive terms. He was elected once again in 1916, Adshead resigned his seat on council in December 1917 to contest the Mayoralty but was defeated by Michael Costello. Adshead attempted a run at Alberta provincial politics. He ran in the 1921 Alberta general election in the Calgary electoral district. His bid for office was unsuccessful. He ran as an independent candidate and finished 14th out of the 20 candidates on the ballot.

Adshead would attempt a career at federal politics. He ran as a Labor candidate in the 1926 Canadian federal election. He was elected, defeating Incumbent Fred Davis. He served one term in the riding of Calgary East until the 1930 Canadian federal election when he was defeated by George Douglas Stanley.

== Published works ==
Adshead was an accomplished writer. He wrote a book about his homesteading experience it was called Pioneer Days. He also wrote 3 other books Pioneer tales & other human stories published in 1924. The Akaitcho youth and unity published posthumously in 1964 and Akeeah: stone sculptor Baker Lake published posthumously in 1968.
