= Samuel Hunter Adams =

Canadian politician

Samuel Hunter Adams KC
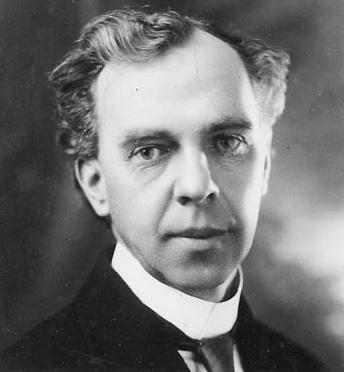

21st Mayor of Calgary
- In office January 3, 1921 – December 31, 1923
- Preceded by: Robert Colin Marshall
- Succeeded by: George Harry Webster

Alderman for The City of Calgary
- In office January 3, 1916 – December 31, 1920

Personal details
- Born: September 3, 1878 near Dundas, Ontario, Canada
- Died: December 10, 1975 (aged 97) Ganges, British Columbia, Canada
- Education: University of Manitoba

Samuel Hunter Adams KC (September 3, 1878 – December 10, 1975) was a Canadian lawyer and politician from Alberta. He was elected the 21st Mayor of Calgary in 1920, serving as mayor for three years.

== Early life ==
Samuel Hunter Adams was born on September 3, 1878, near Dundas, Ontario, to Samuel and Mary J. Adams (née Loughery). Adams attended public school in West Flamborough and high school in Dundas, and later moved to Manitoba in 1897 where he attended Normal School and later taught school. He entered Manitoba College in 1902 and completed a Bachelor of Arts in 1906 and subsequently moved to Calgary later in fall that year.

Adams began studying law when he arrived in Calgary in the offices of Bernard & Bernard and Jones & Nichols. He completed his studies in 1909 and joined Alderman Clifford Teasdale Jones and Ernest Gauntlett Pescod to form the firm Jones, Pescod & Adams, which lasted until 1917 when the partnership was dissolved. He continued to practice independently until 1920, and was appointed King's Counsel. Adams was associated with both the federal and provincial Liberal parties, serving on the executive of the local associations.

Adams married Margaret N. Ross on December 27, 1910, and together had four children.

== Political career ==
Adams was approached by former Aldermen Tappy Frost and Harold Riley to enter civic politics. Adams contested and won the 1915 Calgary municipal election for Aldermen on Calgary City Council. He served five consecutive terms from January 3, 1916, until his resignation on December 31, 1920.

As Alderman, Adams had a significant role in the development of the Centre Street Bridge, which replaced the MacArthur Bridge which was destroyed in the 1915 Calgary flood. Adams witnessed the bridge wash away during the flood with Calgary Commissioner for Public Works Jim Garden, who was standing on the bridge as it washed away. The original design as proposed was a high-level steel bridge, but Adams felt the design did not provide the necessary capacity for the growing city. Adams' input was incorporated into the final design, and the bridge was completed in December 1916. Adams was also a proponent for the construction of the Louise Bridge over the Bow River, however unlike his previous efforts with the Centre Street Bridge, Adams sought a smaller design.

In 1917 Adams with the help of City Solicitor, and future Chief Justice of the Trial Division of the Supreme Court of Alberta Clinton J. Ford worked together successfully to bring single transferable vote to Calgary's municipal elections.

Adams first showed interest in contesting the position of Mayor in the 1918 Calgary municipal election, however he dropped out after learning Michael Copps Costello, a local doctor and Protestant was running, fearing he and Costello would be unsuccessful after splitting the Protestant vote.

=== Mayor of Calgary ===
Adams run for Mayor of Calgary in the 1920 Calgary municipal election, against his only challenger, and fellow Alderman Isaac G. Ruttle. Adams and Ruttle were friends and agreed to spend only $100 during the election, $50 for advertisements in the Calgary Herald and $50 for advertisements in the Albertan. During the campaign the candidates travelled together as Adams did not have a car, and alternated who would speak first at each event. Eventually both candidates broke the agreement to spend only $100 with Ruttle placing advertisements between films in one of the city's theatres, and Adams countered with a $25 advertisement in the Market Examiner. Adams won the election held on December 15, 1920, with approximately 60% of the vote and assumed the role of Calgary's 21st Mayor on January 3, 1920. Adams was acclaimed in the 1921 Calgary municipal election, and decided not to contest the 1922 election for health reasons.

As Mayor, Adams' biggest challenge was handling Calgary's extensive unemployment after the First World War, including the rise of labour unions and civil unrest. During this time there was considerable animosity throughout the city which culminated in threats to elected officials and a bomb threat on Calgary City Hall in March 1922. This culminated in the morning of March 28, 1922, with a prank orchestrated by Calgary Herald writer Chief Buffalo Child Long Lance, where he threw a fake bomb into an active meeting attended by Adams, other Aldermen and city employees. Everyone in attendance rushed out of the meeting, and Commissioner Smith jumped through the closed window 12 feet above the ground. Long Lance, a popular figure in Calgary was fired by the Calgary Herald after the incident and leave the city afterwards.

Adams was instrumental in the approval and construction of Imperial Oil's Lynnview Ridge refinery in Calgary, a CA$2.5 million project. The refinery operated until the 1970s, after which a residential neighbourhood was constructed on the grounds.

On May 18, 1922, Adams gave the first radio broadcast in Calgary on CHCB station at Crescent Heights. The program began with the Harry Lauder recording of "Roamin' in the Gloamin'", and after some more music and sports, Adams gave a speech to Calgarians.

== Later life ==
Samuel Hunter Adams retired from municipal politics in 1923. He practised law in Calgary with the firm Adams, Fitch and Arnold until his retirement in 1955, when he moved to Saltspring Island in British Columbia.

He died on December 10, 1975, and was buried at Union Cemetery in Calgary on December 15, 1975.

== Bibliography ==
- Booth, Nicholas (1975). "Samuel H. Adams, Mayor 1921-1922". Past and Present: People, Places and Events in Calgary. Calgary, Alberta: Century Calgary Publications.

Preceded by Robert Colin Marshall	Mayor of Calgary; 1921–1923	Succeeded by George Harry Webster
