= 1922 Calgary municipal election =

Election in Alberta, Canada

- December 13, 1922
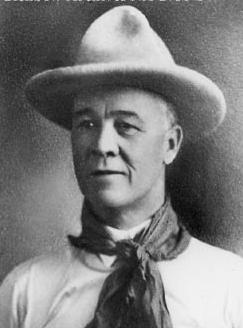

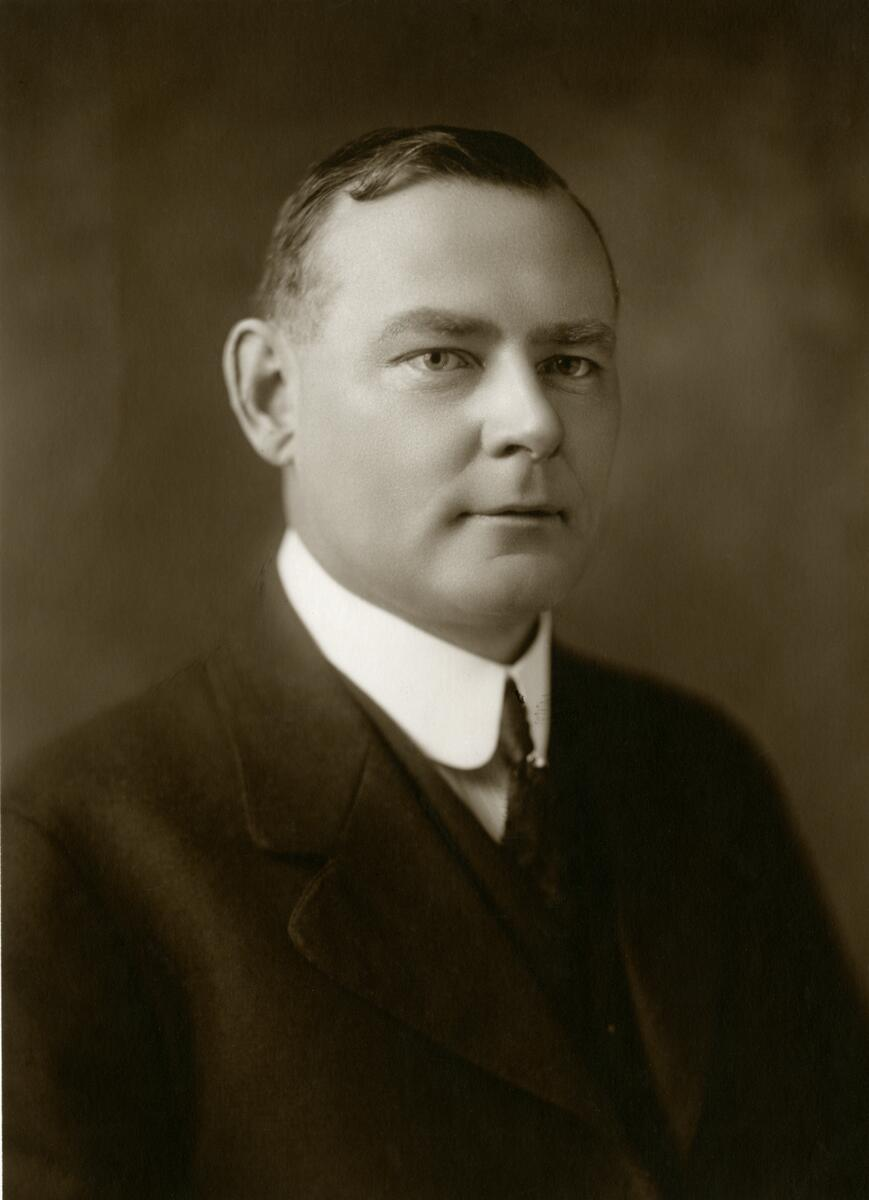
			J. W.
Candidate	George Harry Webster	Michael Copps Costello	James E. Worsley
Popular vote	7,057	5,103	1,056
Percentage	53.40%	38.61%	7.99%
Mayor before election
Samuel Hunter Adams
Elected mayor
George Harry Webster

The 1922 Calgary municipal election was held on December 13, 1922, to elect a mayor, commissioner, seven aldermen to sit on Calgary City Council. In addition three members were elected for the public school board.

A swimming pool bylaw was defeated by a large majority.

Three plebiscites were held, one regarding compensation for aldermen, one to change the position of commissioner to an appointment, and one for a service tax. All three plebiscites were defeated.

The election was held under the Single Transferable Voting/Proportional Representation (STV/PR) with the term for candidates being one year.

== Results ==
- **bold** indicates elected

=== Mayor ===
Party	Candidate	Votes	%	Elected
Citizen's Committee	George Harry Webster	7,057	53.40%	✓
Independent	Michael Copps Costello	5,103	38.61%	
Dominion Labor	James E. Worsley	1,056	7.99%	
Total valid votes		13,168	100.00%	–
Rejected, spoiled and declined		267	–	–

The quota for election was 6,609, with George Harry Webster was elected on the first ballot.

=== Council ===
Party	Candidate	Votes	Count	Elected
Dominion Labor	Fred J. White	1,962	First	✓
Citizen's Committee	Frederick Ernest Osborne	1,810	First	✓
Independent	Thomas H. Crawford	1,544	Fifth	✓
Independent	Frederick Johnston	1,329	Eighth	✓
Citizen's Committee	Neil McDermid	1,011	Tenth	✓
Independent	John Sidney Arnold	964		
Dominion Labor	John Walker Russell	876	Tenth	✓
Dominion Labor	Walter Little	812	Tenth	✓
Citizen's Committee	M. B. Peacock	865		
Independent	Alexander McTaggart	682		
Dominion Labor	Mary S. Corse	551		
Independent	Harry Pryde	353		
Independent	Charles Bell	203		
Total valid votes		12,962	–	–
Rejected, spoiled and declined		521	–	–

The quota required to be elected was 1,621, there were 12,962 total ballots cast.

=== Commissioner ===
Party	Candidate	Votes	%	2nd Ballot
Independent	Arthur G. Graves	4,992	37.91%	6,232
Independent	Angus Smith	5,293	40.20%	6,037
Dominion Labor	Samis	2,783	21.13%	N/A
Total valid votes		13,126	–	–
Rejected, spoiled and declined		357	–	–

There were 13,168 valid ballots, Graves was elected on the 2nd ballot.

=== School Board ===
Party	Candidate	Votes	Count
**Labor**	**Marion Carson**	**3,111**	**First**
**Civic Government Association**	**V. H. Macaulay**	**2,951**	**Second**
**Civic Government Association**	**Geoffrey Silvester**	**1,988**	**Fourth**
Civic Government Association	Lillie C. Woodhall	1,837	
Labor	George McElroy	1,457	
Independent	John Drummond	649	

=== Plebiscites ===
All plebiscites required a two-thirds majority to pass. Only the reduction in number of commissioners plebiscite passed.

==== Swimming Pool Bylaw ====
Plebiscite for Bylaw 2139 - Swimming Pool - Against

Swimming Pool Bylaw	Votes	%
For	1,893	28.21%
**Against**	**4,817**	**71.79%**

==== Election or appointment of Commissioners ====
Plebiscite for the election or Appointment of Commissioners. - election

Election or Appointment of Commissioners	Votes	%
**Election**	**9,792**	**87.62%**
Appointment	1,384	12.38%

== See also ==
- List of Calgary municipal elections
