= George Harry Webster =

Canadian politician (1868–1933)

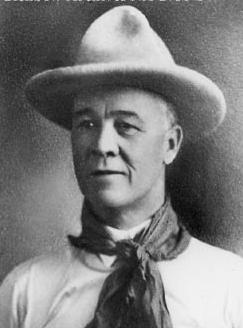

22nd Mayor of Calgary
- In office 1923 – December 31, 1926
- Preceded by: Samuel Adams
- Succeeded by: Frederick Osborne

Member of the Legislative Assembly of Alberta
- In office June 28, 1926 – November 10, 1933
- Preceded by: Alex Ross; Robert Marshall; Robert Pearson; William Davidson
- Succeeded by: William Ross
- Constituency: Calgary

Leader of the Alberta Liberal Party caucus
- In office January 1931 – March 1, 1932 Serving with John McDonald

Interim Leader of the Alberta Liberal Party
- In office March 1, 1932 – October 21, 1932
- Preceded by: John McDonald
- Succeeded by: William Howson

Personal details
- Born: September 2, 1868 Leicester, England
- Died: November 10, 1933 (aged 65) Calgary, Alberta
- Party: Liberal

George Harry Webster (September 2, 1868 – November 10, 1933) was a politician and transportation expert in Alberta, Canada. He served as the 22nd Mayor of the city of Calgary from 1923 to 1926 then served as a member of the Legislative Assembly of Alberta from 1926 to his death in 1933. Webster was popularly known as the "Cowboy Mayor".

== Early life ==
Webster was born in Leicester, England and immigrated to Canada with his parents in 1873, settling first in Orangeville, Ontario. He received his early education in Orangeville. In 1880, the family moved on to Winnipeg and he was employed by the Canadian Pacific Railway working on a construction gang building the westward moving line. Webster arrived in Calgary with the railway in 1883.

== Transportation career ==
In 1900, after working in Washington state for several years, he returned to Calgary to assume the management of P. Burns and Company, a post Webster held through to 1906. He subsequently returned to railway construction and was involved in several large projects, including completion of the Grand Trunk line between Calgary and Tofield.

Webster became interested in road transportation, and became involved with the Southern Alberta Good Roads' Association and the Calgary Auto Club. He studied western Canadian roads, and their impact on tourism, construction and maintenance and the effect on agriculture.

== Municipal career ==
Webster was elected to Calgary City Council as an Alderman in 1919 and served for three years. He became Mayor in 1923 defeating former mayor Michael Copps Costello and Labor candidate J. E. Worsley in the December 13, 1922, municipal election on the first ballot. Webster would be elected for a second term in the December 12, 1924, general election, and was acclaimed for a third term on December 9, 1925. He resigned as city mayor to run in the 1926 Alberta general election: it was approved by city council and came into effect on December 31, 1926.

== Provincial career and death ==
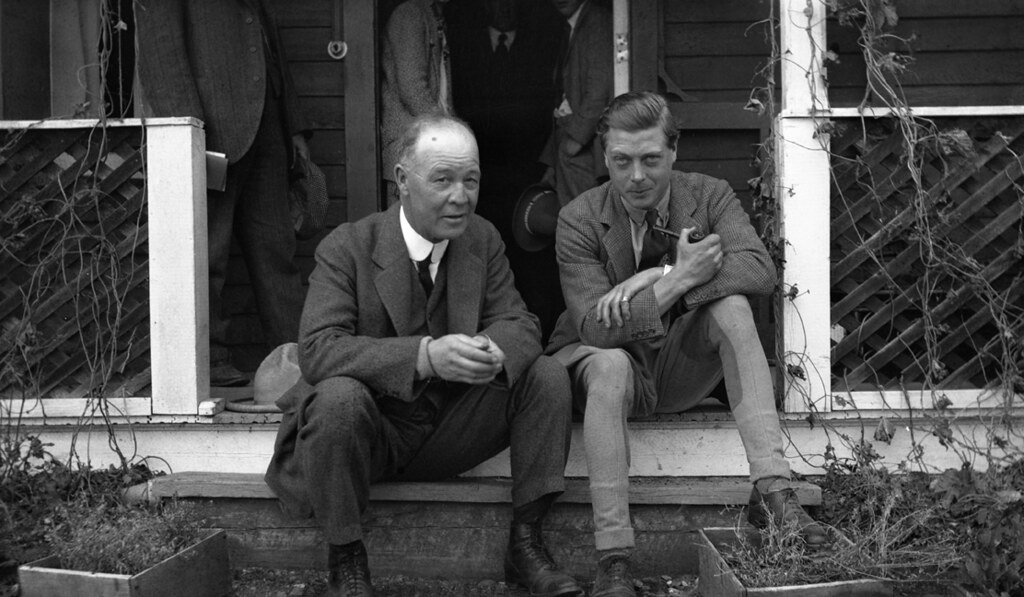
Webster with Edward, Prince of Wales at EP Ranch in 1923

Webster was an unsuccessful Liberal candidate for the Calgary constituency in the 1921 Alberta general election. He ran for a seat to the Alberta Legislature as a Liberal candidate in the Calgary electoral district in the 1926 Alberta general election. He won the second place seat.

Webster nominated John McDonald to stand for the leadership of the Alberta Liberal Party at the convention held on March 28, 1930. McDonald won that race over two other candidates.

Webster ran for a second term in the 1930 Alberta general election. He held his seat in the Calgary district but McDonald did not. The Liberal caucus chose Webster to serve as Leader of the Liberal caucus in the Assembly in January 1931 while McDonald continued to serve as leader of the party. This arrangement continued for over a year before McDonald who was unable to obtain a seat resigned on March 1, 1932. This resignation made Webster the interim leader, a position which he held until William Howson was acclaimed at a convention on October 21, 1932.

Webster died on November 10, 1933, while still holding office.
