= Robert Colin Marshall =

Canadian politician

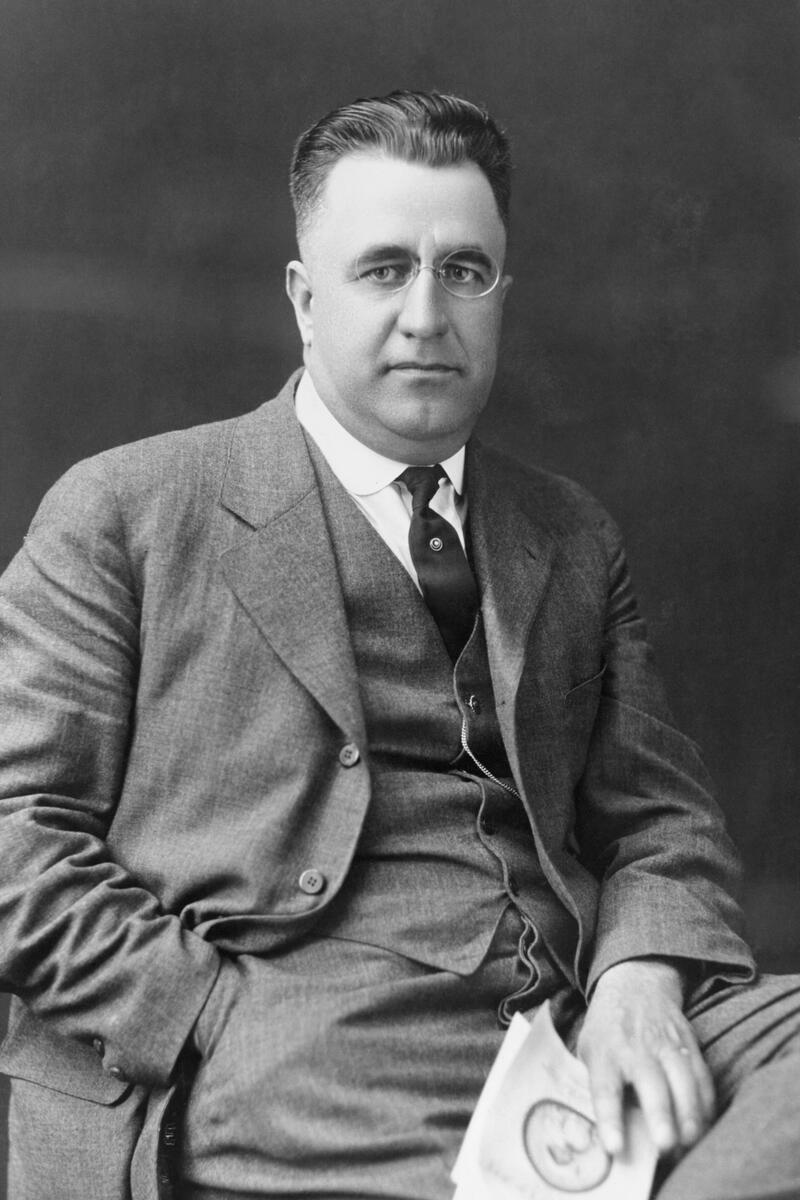

20th Mayor of Calgary
- In office January 2, 1919 – January 3, 1921
- Preceded by: Michael Copps Costello
- Succeeded by: Samuel Hunter Adams

Member of the Legislative Assembly of Alberta
- In office July 18, 1921 – June 27, 1926
- Constituency: Calgary

Personal details
- Born: May 19, 1883 Ingersoll, Ontario, Canada
- Died: February 20, 1962 (aged 78) Fort Lauderdale, Florida, USA
- Party: Liberal
- Spouse(s): Annie Mae Batchelor (d.1915); Daisy Mary MacGregor

Robert Colin Marshall (May 19, 1883 – February 20, 1962) was a politician in Alberta, Canada. Marshall served as the 20th Mayor of Calgary, Alberta from 1919 to 1921, and as a Member of the Legislative Assembly of Alberta.

Marshall was born in Ingersoll, Ontario in 1883 to parents Peter Marshall and Katherine Allen. He arrived in Calgary in 1906 and started working for the Crown Paving Company Limited. Marshall was associated with this company until its sale in 1961.

In 1907, he married Annie Mae Batchelor, who died in 1915. Together they had one child, Margaret Alexandra, born in 1909. On July 19, 1919, in his first year as mayor he married Daisy Mary MacGregor, the City Hall reporter for the Calgary Herald. Together they had two children, Donald and Joan.

Marshall would spend three years serving as an Alderman on Calgary City Council. Marshall would serve as Mayor of Calgary for two years, first contesting the 1918 Calgary municipal election defeating opponent and incumbent Mayor Michael Copps Costello with 3,428 votes, a slim margin of victory of 194. Marshall also contested the 1919 election, easily defeating opponent Isaac G. Ruttle.

He then moved on to provincial politics, becoming a Liberal MLA just as the Liberals lost power to the United Farmers of Alberta. He ran as a Liberal in the 1921 Alberta general election. He won a provincial seat to sit as MLA for Calgary electoral district. His support dropped significantly in the 1926 Alberta general election and he was not re-elected.

In 1928, Marshall moved to Edmonton and remained there until his retirement. He was involved in the YMCA, Rotary Club and the Alberta Union of Municipalities. He was a freemason and an oddfellow.

He ran for the House of Commons of Canada in Edmonton East as a Liberal candidate in a by-election held on March 21, 1938 but was defeated by Social Credit candidate Orvis A. Kennedy.

Marshall died in 1962 while holidaying in Fort Lauderdale, Florida.

== Bibliography ==
- Leslie, Jean (1975). "Robert Colin Marshall, Mayor 1919-1920". Past and Present: People, Places and Events in Calgary. Calgary, Alberta: Century Calgary Publications.

Legislative Assembly of Alberta
Preceded by William Cushing; Thomas Tweedie	MLA Calgary; 1921–1926	Succeeded by Alexander McGillivray; John Irwin; George Webster; Robert Parkyn
Political offices
Preceded by Michael Copps Costello	Mayor of Calgary; 1919–1921	Succeeded by Samuel Hunter Adams
