= Hannah Gale =

British-born Canadian politician (1876 – 1970)

Hannah Elizabeth Rolinson Gale

Calgary City Council Alderman
- In office January 2, 1918 – January 2, 1924

Personal details
- Born: December 29, 1876 Netherton, West Midlands, England
- Died: August 7, 1970 (aged 93) Vancouver, British Columbia
- Spouse: William Gale
- Nickname: Annie

Hannah "Annie" Elizabeth Rolinson Gale (December 29, 1876 – August 7, 1970) was a British-born Canadian politician who was one of the first women to hold an elected political position in Canada. She served as an Alderman on Calgary City Council 1918 to 1924.

== Early life and personal life ==
Gale, nicknamed Annie at an early age, was born in Netherton, West Midlands, England. The daughter of a merchant grocer and his wife, she attended an all-girls school. Upon her completion she passed the Oxford entrance examination. As a woman, however, she was not able to become a student at Oxford University. She began helping run the family business after her father died of pneumonia.

In 1901, at the age of 25, Annie married engineer William Gale. The couple and their two sons (born in 1902 and 1905) eventually left to join their extended family, who had emigrated to Canada and eventually settled in Calgary, Alberta in 1912.

== Career ==
Gale took an active interest in her new home. She soon noticed the poor quality and high prices charged for vegetables. This she found was a result of grocers having contracts with BC producers so the cost of transportation was added to the price plus the long time in transit accounted for the poor quality. Gale joined the Consumers League, founded to contest wartime profiteering and the high cost of living, and helped establish a City Market (farmers market) where sellers cold sell local produce. She also played a leading role in the Vacant Lots Garden Club whose motto was "make the waste places into fruitful gardens.

Hearing tales of isolated farm women having to give birth without proper medical attendance, she became secretary of the Free Hospital League, which was dedicated to "work for hospitals as free as the public school system." The organization, with support from the United Farmers of Alberta, pushed Alberta's Liberal government to initiate public hospitals.

She began helping run the family business after her father died of pneumonia.

Gale played a major role in promoting the women's suffrage movement in Canada and organized Calgary's Women's Ratepayers Association, the first of its kind in Canada. She accepted the group's invitation to run in the 1917 Calgary city election. She was elected to the Calgary City Council on December 10, 1917. She was among the first women in Canada, and in the British Commonwealth, to be elected to an elected position in any level of government, following shortly after two women were elected in the provincial election earlier that same year.

The following year Gale was elected as acting mayor by her fellow members on the city council. For the first time in the British Empire, a woman performed the duties of a mayor, when the elected mayor was unable to perform his duties.

She was re-elected to city council in December 1919 as an Independent candidate. Her election, instead of better-connected Dominion Labour Party candidates John Rae and Walter Smitten, was unexpected and demonstrated the strength of the One Big Union section of Calgary's labour movement. She was a strong supporter of a "yes" vote in the plebiscite on a city hospital that accompanied the 1919 city election. She was re-elected again in December 1921.

In the 1921 Alberta provincial election, she ran as an independent Labour candidate in Calgary. Gale was unsuccessful, placing 16th out of the 20 candidates running for the district's five seats.

Her strong advocacy for working families made enemies, and they contrived to force her husband to resign from his employment with the City Engineering Department in 1923. She felt she could not serve on city council after his resignation so did not run for re-election when her third term on council expired a few months later.

In 1924, she was elected as a public school trustee for the Calgary Board of Education. The following year she resigned when she and her family moved to Vancouver, British Columbia. They moved there in hopes the coastal climate would help her husband's declining health - he died in 1939.

Annie Gale resided in Vancouver until her death in 1970 at the age of 93.

== Legacy ==
The Canadian Magazine said of Gale, in a 1917 article: "She is exactly the type of woman who should be in public life--a feminine, gracious, magnetic personality without aggression or bombast; a woman with a charming platform manner which does not come off the instant she reaches the bottom step and stands on the floor of the hall; the type of woman of whom the West is justly proud."

Gale said: "I have always believed that the mission of women in political life was to clean up politics."

Feminist Nellie McClung paid tribute to Annie Gale: "Women haven't an easy time in public life and Mrs. Gale has played her part courageously and intelligently. Mrs. Gale could always be depended upon to take a sane, forward, dependable view. Her tact and charming personality have carried her through many difficulties. Women haven't an easy time in public life but they count the cost before they enter. Mrs. Gale has always upheld the standards of womanhood and we cherish the hope that she will come back to us again."

In 1983, a junior high school was named after her in the Calgary community of Whitehorn.

In 1985 Judith Lishman's book "Alderman Mrs. Annie Gale" was published by Sheila Graham, in Vancouver.

In 2016, a boardroom in the municipal building in Calgary was named after her.
