= Michael Copps Costello =

Canadian politician

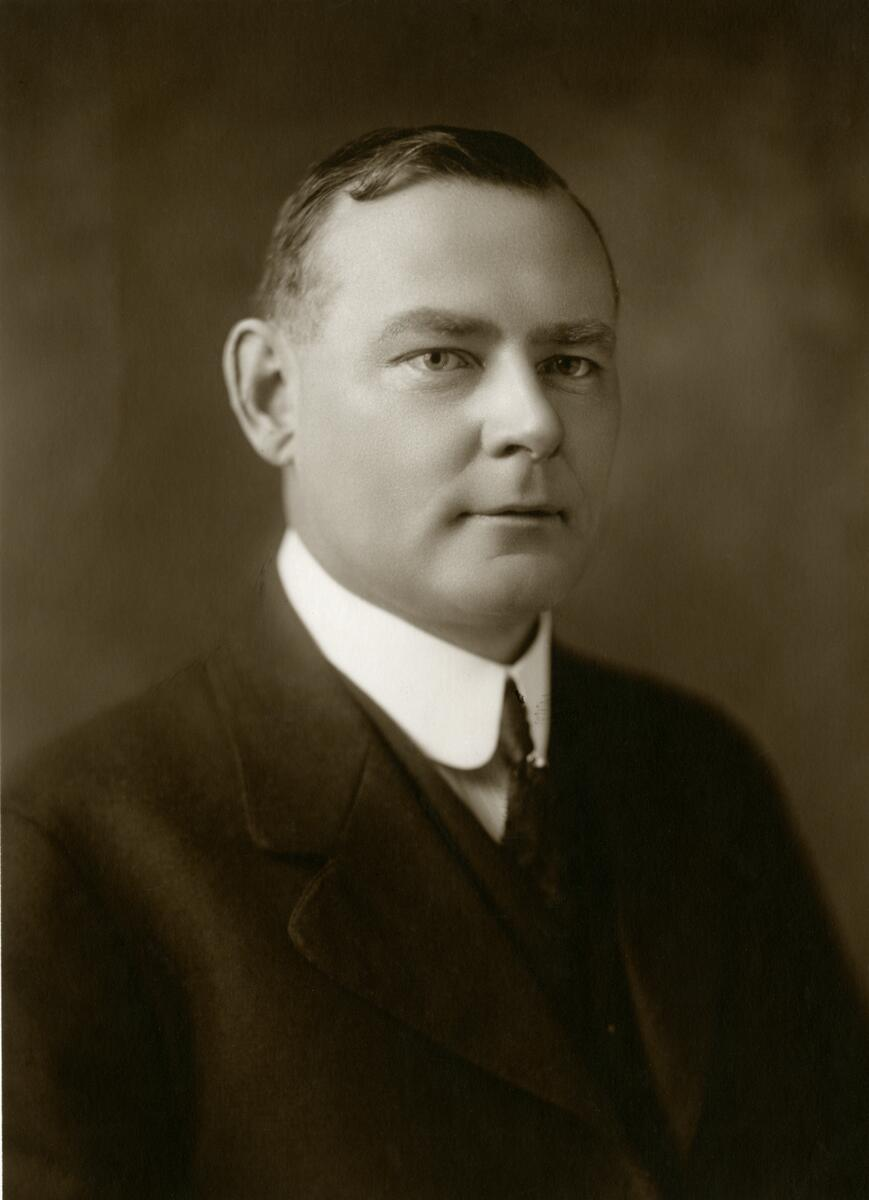

19th Mayor of Calgary
- In office January 2, 1915 – January 2, 1919
- Preceded by: Herbert Arthur Sinnott
- Succeeded by: Robert Colin Marshall

Alderman of the City of Calgary
- In office January 2, 1913 – December 29, 1914

Personal details
- Born: William Costello; August 2, 1875 Montreal, Quebec, Canada
- Died: March 22, 1936 (aged 60) Calgary, Alberta, Canada
- Education: Queen's University

Michael Copps Costello (August 2, 1875 – March 22, 1936) was a Canadian printer, a medical graduate (who never practiced his profession) and the 19th mayor of Calgary, Alberta, holding office from 1915 to 1919.

== Early life ==
William Costello was born in Montreal, Quebec in 1875 to John William Costello and Elizabeth Copps. As a child, he was known as Copps Costello, the name by which he is described in the 1891 census for Calgary, having been enumerated as Michael William Costello in the 1881 census for Renfrew Village, Ontario. In adult life, he changed his middle name to his mother's maiden name, Copps, the name by which he was generally known.

Copps arrived in Calgary on the historic first train to the city in 1883. His early education was in Calgary and he became an apprentice printer. After completing his apprenticeship, he began working for the Calgary Herald. He went on to study medicine at Queen's University in Kingston in 1904. He then went to London, England for a year's post-graduate education and continued with further medical studies at the Rotunda Hospital in Dublin, Ireland. While in Ireland, he visited his father's birthplace at Trienearagh, County Kerry. He married Pearl Corrigan in Kingston in 1910.

Michael's father John William Costello was a trustee of the Separate School District of the Northwest Territories, and chairman of the board from 1899 to 1904 which would later become the Calgary Catholic School Board. The John Costello Catholic School is named in his honour.

== Political career ==
On his return to Calgary, Costello entered municipal politics. In 1913 and 1914, he was an alderman on Calgary City Council. In the latter year, he was chosen to carry the responsibilities of acting mayor, during Mayor Sinnott's absence of three months. In the election that year, he was elected Mayor of Calgary. He spent four years as mayor from January 2, 1915, to January 2, 1919. Costello served as president of the Alberta Urban Municipalities Association in 1915–1916.

Costello ran unsuccessfully for mayor in the 1922 municipal election. He ran unsuccessfully as a Conservative MLA candidate in the Calgary electoral riding in the 1921 and 1926 Alberta general elections.

== Later life ==
Following his retirement from the mayoralty, Costello became connected with the Calgary Iron Works, where he worked in an executive capacity for many years before retiring for health reasons.

Costello was a founding member of the Southern Alberta Pioneer and Old Timers' Association and served as Grand Knight on the Calgary Council of the Knights of Columbus.

Costello died in 1936, aged 60 and is buried in Saint Mary's Pioneer Cemetery in Calgary.

Preceded by Herbert Arthur Sinnott	Mayor of Calgary; 1915–1919	Succeeded by Robert Colin Marshall
