= Calgary Catholic School District =

School district in Alberta, Canada

Calgary Roman Catholic Separate School District No. 1 Calgary Catholic School District

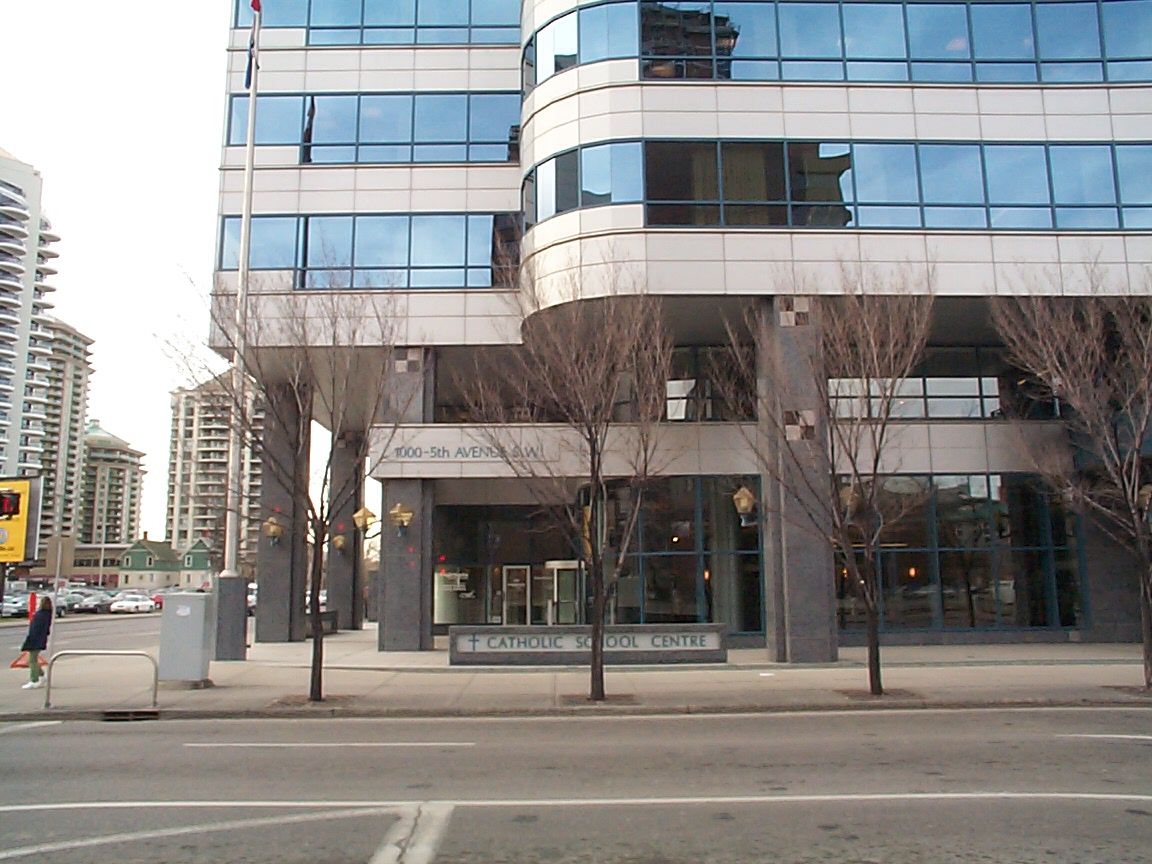
- Catholic School Centre (CSSD head offices)

Location
- 1000 - 5 Avenue SW; Calgary, Alberta Airdrie, Calgary, Chestermere, Cochrane Canada
- Coordinates: 51°2′57″N 114°5′2″W

District information
- Superintendent: Bryan Szumlas
- Schools: 117
- Budget: CA$613.5 million

Students and staff
- Students: over 64,000

Other information
- Website: www.cssd.ab.ca

Calgary Roman Catholic Separate School District No. 1 or the Calgary Catholic School District (CCSD) is the Roman Catholic separate school board in Calgary, Alberta, Canada. It also serves the neighbouring communities of Airdrie, Chestermere, Cochrane and Rocky View County. The CSSD receives funding for students from the provincial government of Alberta.

== History ==
The district was founded on 18 December 1885 as the Lacombe Roman Catholic School District No. 1 in what was then part of the North West Territories. Its first school, also built in 1885, was St. Mary's, which is the oldest operating school in Calgary (though in a newer building).

== Size ==
The CSSD is second in size (by student count) to the city's main school board, the public Calgary Board of Education (CBE). Unlike the Calgary Board of Education, the territory of the CSSD extends slightly outside the municipal limits of the city. It is the largest publicly funded Catholic School District in Western Canada.

For the 2020 - 2021 school year, there were over 59,000 students in the CSSD, with 118 schools in total.

== Governance ==
A group of seven elected trustees run the CSSD. Trustees represent wards in the city, as well as neighboring communities. They are elected every three years, in the regular municipal election. In the election, Calgary voters can only vote for a trustee to one (not both) of the two school boards. Voters for the CSSD will include Catholics and non-Catholics who support the Catholic system. The public (CBE) and Catholic (CSSD) systems operate independently of each other, and are both under the direct authority of the provincial government of Alberta. The last election was in October 2017.

== Special programs ==
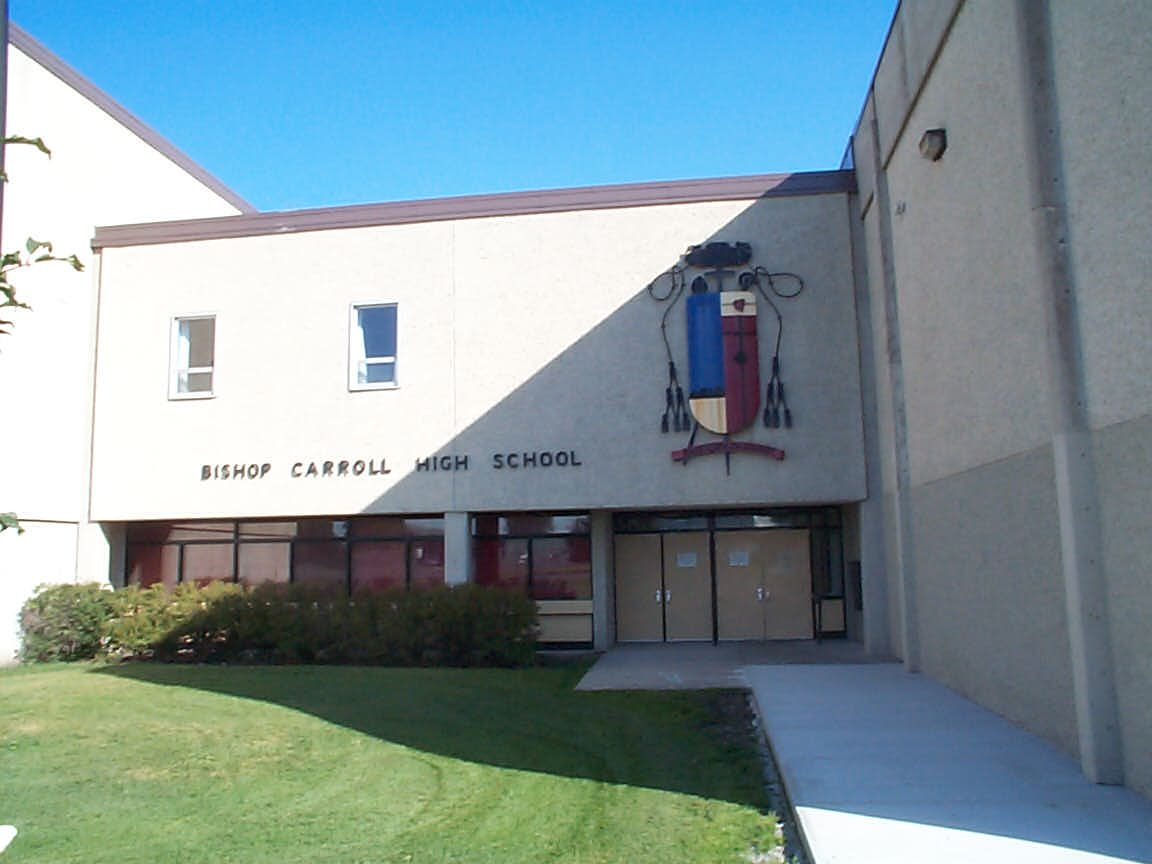
Bishop Carroll High School (photo taken in 2006)

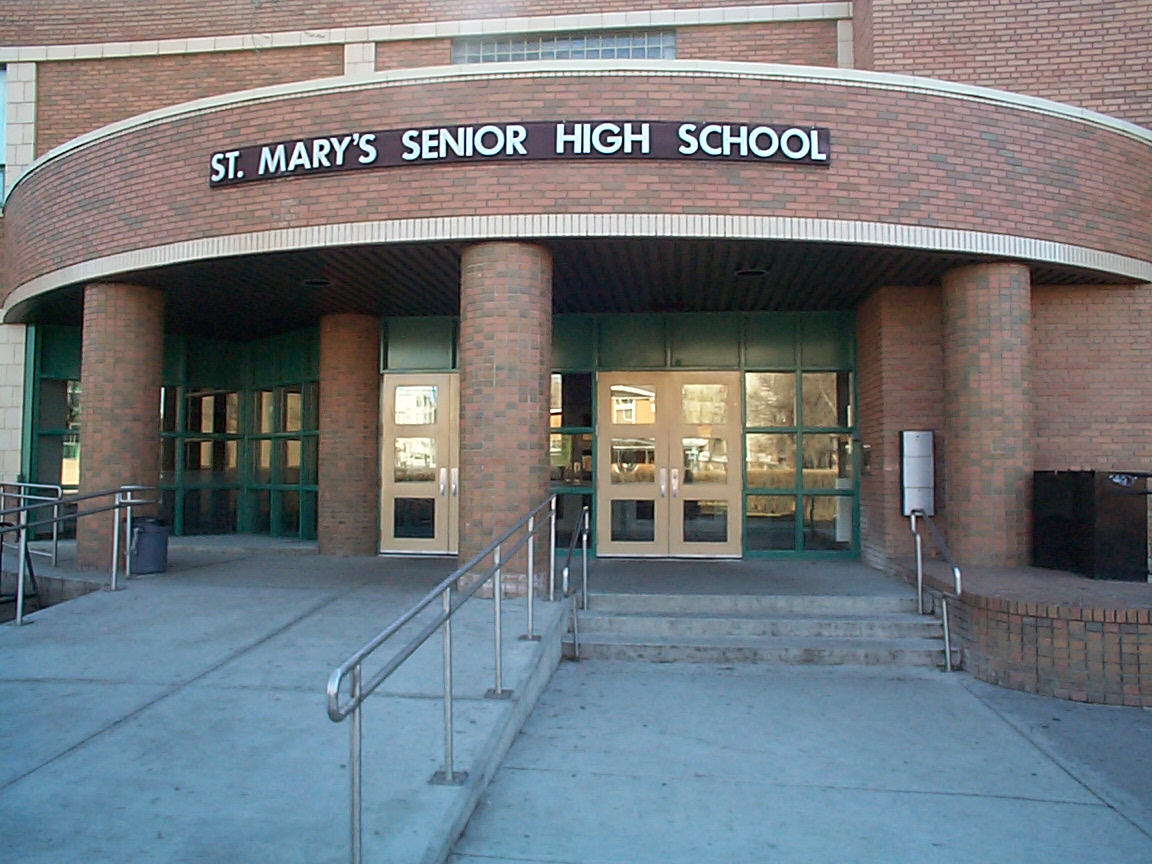
St. Mary's High School (photo taken in 2005)

The CSSD offers a variety of specialized programs, including Advanced Placement, Fine Arts, the Hockey Canada Skills Academy, Home Study, International Baccalaureate, Languages, Single Gender and Year-Round Education. There is also the Self-Directed Learning program at Bishop Carroll High School, which allows students to move through the Alberta curriculum at their own individual pace.

== Elementary and junior high schools ==
In Alberta, an elementary school normally teaches Kindergarten to Grade 6, while a junior high school teaches Grades 7–9. Some junior high schools are combined with high schools or elementary schools. Some schools may have French Immersion in Grade 7, 8 or 9. The following list provides information on CSSD elementary and junior high schools.

| Name | Type | City/Town | Grades |
|---|---|---|---|
| Ascension of Our Lord | Elementary Jr. High | Calgary | K-9 |
| Bishop Kidd | Jr. High | Calgary | 7-9 |
| Blessed Marie-Rose | Elementary Jr. High | Calgary | K-9 |
| Blessed Mother Teresa | Elementary | Calgary | K-6 |
| Christ the King | Elementary Jr. High | Calgary | K-9 |
| Corpus Christi | Elementary | Calgary | K-6 |
| Don Bosco | Elementary Jr. High | Calgary | K-9 |
| Father Doucet | Elementary | Calgary | K-6 |
| Father James Whelihan | Elementary Jr. High | Calgary | K-9 |
| Father Scollen | Elementary Jr. High | Calgary | K-9 |
| Guardian Angel | Elementary | Calgary | K-6 |
| Good Shepherd | Elementary Jr. High | Airdrie | K-8 |
| Holy Angels | Elementary | Calgary | K-6 |
| Holy Cross | Elementary Jr. High | Calgary | K-9 |
| Holy Family | Elementary | Calgary | K-6 |
| Holy Name | Elementary | Calgary | K-6 |
| Holy Spirit | Elementary | Cochrane | K-6 |
| Holy Trinity | Elementary | Calgary | K-6 |
| John Costello | Elementary | Calgary | K-6 |
| Light of Christ | Elementary Jr. High | Calgary | K-9 |
| Madeleine d'Houet | Jr. High | Calgary | 7-9 |
| Mother Mary Greene | Elementary | Calgary | K-6 |
| Msgr. A.J. Hetherington | Elementary | Calgary | K-6 |
| Msgr. E.L. Doyle | Elementary | Calgary | K-6 |
| Msgr. J.J. O'Brien | Elementary Jr. High | Calgary | K-9 |
| Msgr. J.S. Smith | Elementary Jr. High | Calgary | K-9 |
| Msgr. Neville Anderson | Elementary | Calgary | K-6 |
| Our Lady of Fatima | Elementary | Calgary | K-6 |
| Our Lady of Grace | Elementary Jr. High | Calgary | K-9 |
| Our Lady of Lourdes | Elementary Jr. High | Calgary | K-9 |
| Our Lady of Peace | Elementary Jr. High | Calgary | K-9 |
| Our Lady of the Assumption | Elementary Jr. High | Calgary | K-9 |
| Our Lady of the Evergreens | Elementary | Calgary | K-6 |
| Our Lady of the Rosary | Elementary | Calgary | K-6 |
| Our Lady of Wisdom | Elementary | Chestermere | K-6 |
| Our Lady Queen of Peace | Elementary Jr. High | Airdrie | K-8 |
| Sacred Heart | Elementary | Calgary | K-6 |
| St. Albert the Great | Elementary Jr. High | Calgary | K-9 |
| St. Alphonsus | Elementary Jr. High | Calgary | K-9 |
| St. Ambrose | Elementary Jr. High | Calgary | K-9 |
| St. Andrew | Elementary | Calgary | K-6 |
| St. Angela | Elementary | Calgary | K-6 |
| St. Anthony | Elementary | Calgary | 4-6 |
| St. Augustine | Elementary Jr. High | Calgary | K-9 |
| St. Basil | Elementary Jr. High | Calgary | K-9 |
| St. Bede | Elementary | Calgary | K-6 |
| St. Benedict | Elementary | Calgary | K-6 |
| St. Bernadette | Elementary | Calgary | K-6 |
| St. Bonaventure | Jr. High | Calgary | 7-9 |
| St. Boniface | Elementary | Calgary | K-6 |
| St. Brigid | Elementary Jr. High | Calgary | K-9 |
| St. Catherine | Elementary | Calgary | K-6 |
| St. Cecilia | Elementary | Calgary | K-6 |
| St. Clare | Elementary | Calgary | K-6 |
| St. Cyril | Elementary Jr. High | Calgary | K-9 |
| St. Damien | Elementary | Calgary | K-6 |
| St. Dominic | Elementary | Calgary | K-6 |
| St. Elizabeth Seton | Elementary Jr. High | Calgary | K-9 |
| St. Gabriel the Archangel | Jr. High, High School | Chestermere | 7-12 |
| St. Gerard | Elementary | Calgary | K-6 |
| St. Gregory | Jr. High | Calgary | 6-9 |
| St. Helena | Jr. High | Calgary | 7-9 |
| St. Henry | Elementary | Calgary | K-6 |
| St. Hubert | Elementary | Calgary | K-6 |
| St. Isabella | Elementary Jr. High | Calgary | K-9 |
| St. James | Elementary Jr. High | Calgary | K-9 |
| St. Jean Brebeuf | Jr. High | Calgary | 7-9 |
| St. Jerome | Elementary | Calgary | K-6 |
| St. Joan of Arc | Elementary Jr. High | Calgary | K-9 |
| St. John Henry Newman | Elementary Jr. High | Calgary | K-9 |
| St. John Paul II | Elementary | Calgary | K-6 |
| St. John XXIII | Elementary Jr. High | Calgary | K-9 |
| St. Joseph | Elementary Jr. High | Calgary | K-9 |
| St. Josephine Bakhita | Elementary | Calgary | K-6 |
| St. Jude | Elementary | Calgary | K-6 |
| St. Kateri Tekakwitha | Elementary | Calgary | K-6 |
| St. Luke | Elementary | Calgary | K-6 |
| St. Margaret | Elementary Jr. High | Calgary | K-9 |
| St. Maria Goretti School | Elementary | Calgary | K-6 |
| St. Mark | Elementary | Calgary | K-6 |
| St. Martha | Elementary Jr. High | Calgary | K-9 |
| St. Matthew | Elementary Jr. High | Calgary | K-9 |
| St. Michael | Elementary Jr. High | Calgary | K-9 |
| St. Monica | Elementary Jr. High | Calgary | K-9 |
| St. Patrick | Elementary | Calgary | K-6 |
| St. Peter | Elementary | Calgary | K-6 |
| St. Philip | Elementary | Calgary | K-6 |
| St. Pius X | Elementary | Calgary | K-6 |
| St. Rita | Elementary | Calgary | K-6 |
| St. Rose of Lima | Elementary Jr. High | Calgary | K-9 |
| St. Rupert | Elementary | Calgary | K-6 |
| St. Sebastian | Elementary | Calgary | K-6 |
| St. Stephen | Elementary Jr. High | Calgary | K-9 |
| St. Sylvester | Elementary | Calgary | K-6 |
| St. Thomas Aquinas | Elementary | Calgary | K-5 |
| St. Thomas More | Elementary | Calgary | K-6 |
| St. Timothy Jr./Sr. High School | Jr. High/High School | Cochrane | 7-12 |
| St. Veronica School | Elementary Jr. High | Airdrie | K-7 |
| St. Vincent de Paul | Elementary Jr. High | Calgary | K-9 |
| St. Wilfrid | Elementary | Calgary | K-6 |
| St. William | Elementary | Calgary | K-6 |

== Senior high schools ==
In Alberta, a senior high school teaches Grades 10-12 (what other jurisdictions call "secondary schools"). However, some may not teach all three grades. Also, some may also teach earlier grades. The following is a list of CSSD senior high schools.

| Name | Address | City/Town | Grades |
|---|---|---|---|
| All Saints High School | 729 Legacy Village Road SE | Calgary | 10-12 |
| Bishop Carroll High School | 4624 Richard Road S.W. | Calgary | 10-12 |
| Bishop McNally High School | 5700 Falconridge Blvd. N.E. | Calgary | 10-12 |
| Bishop O'Byrne High School | 500, 333 Shawville Blvd. S.E. | Calgary | 10-12 |
| Father Lacombe High School | 3615 Radcliffe Drive S.E. | Calgary | 10-12 |
| Notre Dame High School | 11900 Country Village Link N.E. | Calgary | 10-12 |
| Our Lady of Lourdes School | 1916 2 Street S.W. | Calgary | 1-12 |
| Our Lady of the Rockies High School | 111 Haddon Road S.W. | Calgary | 10-12 |
| St. Anne Academic Centre | 1010-21 Ave. SE | Calgary | 12 |
| St. Francis High School | 877 Northmount Drive N.W. | Calgary | 10-12 |
| St. Gabriel The Archangel School | 197 Invermere Drive | Chestermere | K-12 |
| St. Martin de Porres High School | 410 Yankee Valley Blvd. S.W. | Airdrie | 9-12 |
| St. Mary's High School | 111 - 18 Avenue S.W. | Calgary | 10-12 |
| St. Timothy High School | 501 Sunset Drive | Cochrane | 7-12 |

== See also ==
- List of Alberta school boards
