= 1909 Calgary municipal election =

1909 election in Calgary, Alberta, Canada

← 1908	December 13, 1909	1910 →
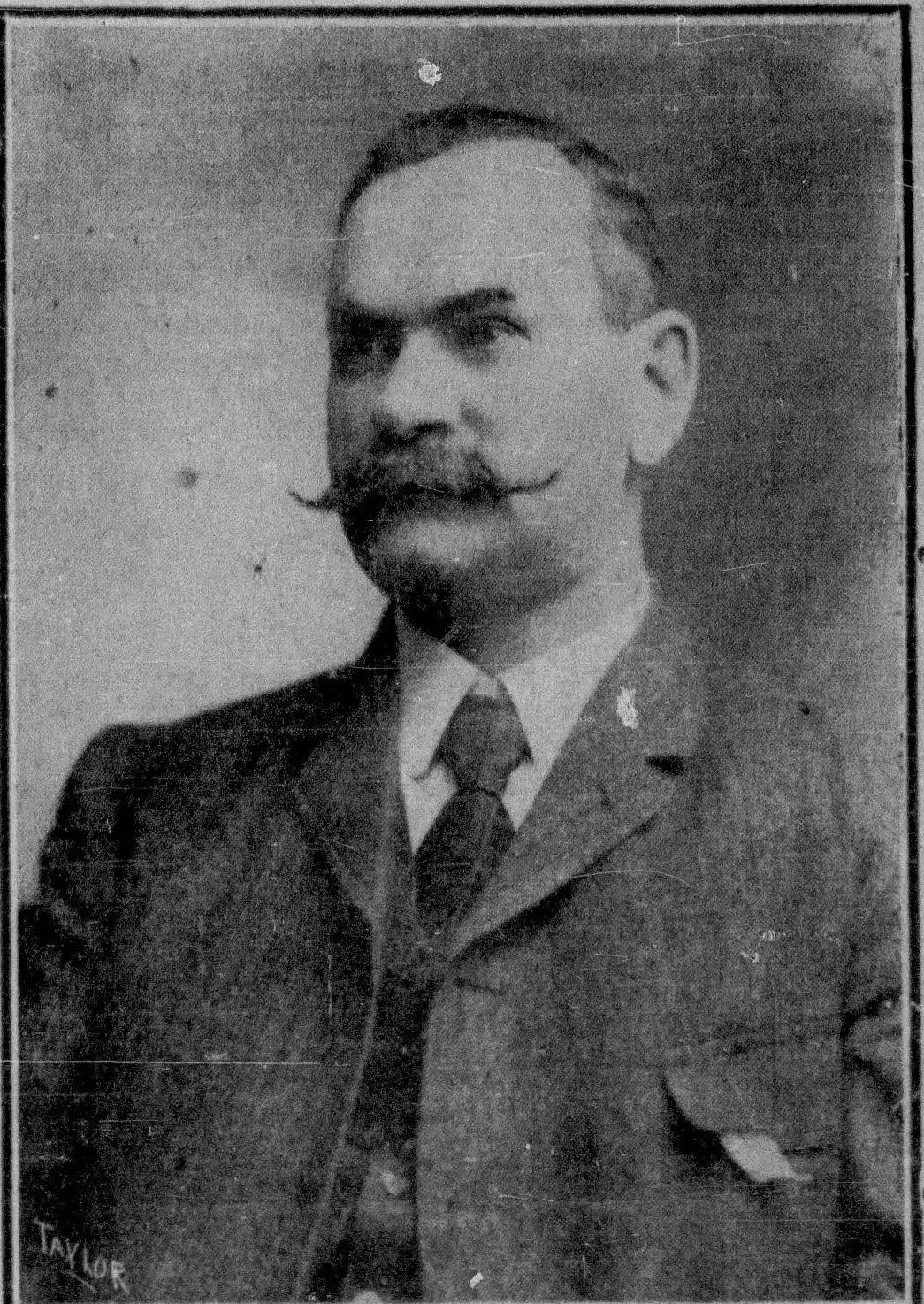
Candidate	Reuben Rupert Jamieson
Popular vote	Acclaimed
Mayor before election
Reuben Rupert Jamieson
Elected mayor
Reuben Rupert Jamieson

The 1909 Calgary municipal election took place on December 13, 1909 to elect a Mayor and twelve Aldermen to sit on the twenty-sixth Calgary City Council from January 3, 1910 to January 2, 1911.

Mayor Reuben Rupert Jamieson was acclaimed upon the close of nominations on December 6, 1909.

== Background ==
The election was held under multiple non-transferable vote where each elector was able to cast a ballot for the mayor and up to three ballots for separate councillors with a voter's designated ward.

== Results ==
=== Mayor ===
- Reuben Rupert Jamieson – Acclaimed

=== Commissioner ===
Candidate	Votes	Percent
Arthur Garnet Graves	1,248	
Simon John Clarke	1,194	
John Goodwin Watson	749	
Robert Suitor	217	

=== Councillors ===
==== Ward 1 ====
Candidate	Votes	Percent
George Henry Ross	562	
George Ernest Wood	471	
Malcolm Halladay	336	
Thomas A. Clouston	272	
Christopher Poffenroth	270	
Thomas Hart	131	

==== Ward 2 ====
- James Smalley
- William Henry Ross

==== Ward 3 ====
Candidate	Votes	Percent
Richard Addison Brocklebank	339	
John William Mitchell	308	
Milton Ross Wallace	251	
Thomas John Searle Skinner	249	

==== Ward 4 ====
Candidate	Votes	Percent
William Egbert	397	
Clifford Bernard Reilly	395	
Clifford Teasdale Jones	366	
Sydney Houlton	243	
William J. Ferguson	115	

=== School Boards ===
==== Public School Board ====
- James Walker - acclaimed
- Herbert Arthur Sinnott - acclaimed

==== Separate School Board ====
- P. Burns - acclaimed
- E.H. Rouleau - acclaimed
- John Kenny - acclaimed

=== Plebiscite ===
A bylaw providing that the legislature be requested to give the ratepayers an opportunity of voting on a question of adopting a commission form of government.

- For – 1,182
- Against – 367

== See also ==
- List of Calgary municipal elections
