= 1908 Calgary municipal election =

Election in Alberta, Canada

← 1907	December 14, 1908	1909 →
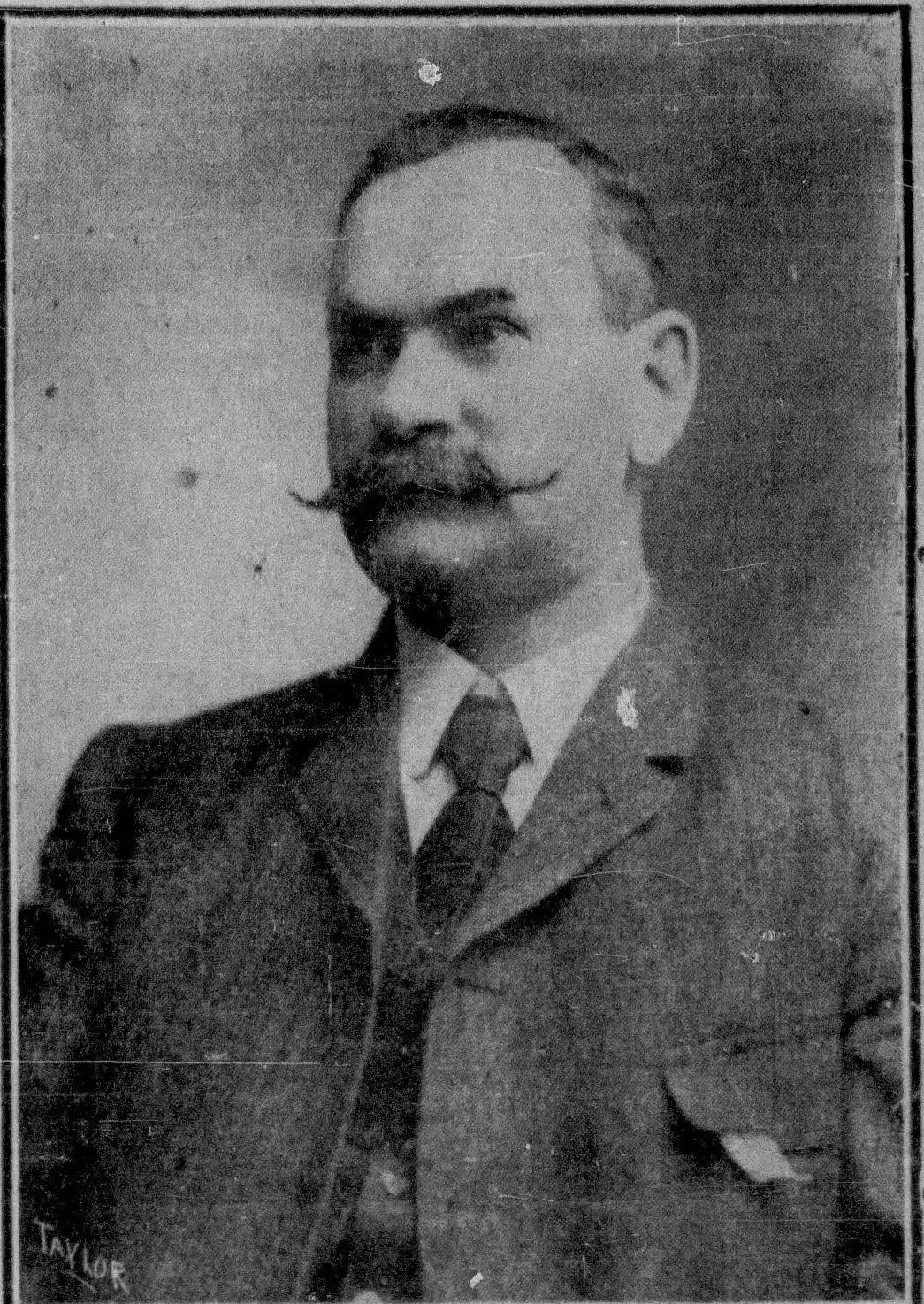

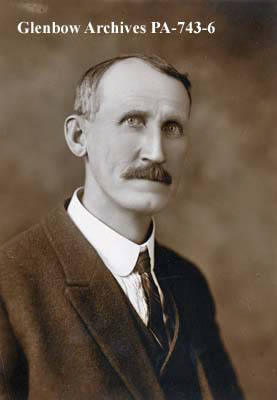
			A.J.S.
Candidate	Reuben Rupert Jamieson	James Abel Hornby	Adoniram Judson Samis
Popular vote	1,275	780	323
	R.J.S.
Candidate	Robert James Stuart
Popular vote	228
Mayor before election
Arthur Leslie Cameron
Elected mayor
Reuben Rupert Jamieson

The 1908 Calgary municipal election was held on December 14, 1908 to elect a Mayor and twelve Aldermen to sit on the twenty-fifth Calgary City Council from January 2, 1909 to January 3, 1910.

== Background ==
The election was held under multiple non-transferable vote where each elector was able to cast a ballot for the mayor and up to three ballots for separate councillors with a voter's designated ward.

== Results ==
=== Mayor ===
Candidate	Votes	Percent
Reuben Rupert Jamieson	1,275	
James Abel Hornby	780	
Adoniram Judson Samis	323	
Robert James Stuart	228	

=== Councillors ===
==== Ward 1 ====
Candidate	Votes	Percent
George Nelson Erb	477	
John Leslie Speer	443	
Alfred Moodie	442	
George E. Wood	392	
Henry Haskins	227	
William Scott	223	
William Pitman	207	

==== Ward 2 ====
Candidate	Votes	Percent
William Henry Manarey	468	
Frederick Joseph Green	450	
Edward George King	415	
Ross	343	
George S. Wayman	336	
Bennett	319	

==== Ward 3 ====
Candidate	Votes	Percent
Richard Addison Brocklebank	476	
John William Mitchell	432	
Milton Ross Wallace	352	
Isaac Gideon Ruttle	282	

==== Ward 4 ====
Candidate	Votes	Percent
John Goodwin Watson	562	
William Egbert	557	
Clifford Bernard Reilly	342	
Sydney Houlton	332	
Haldy	297	
Ferguson	186	
Philip Murphy	94	
Taylor	90	

== By-elections ==
Ward 1 Alderman Alfred Moodie suffered a heart attack on January 30, 1909, and died later that day at the age of 42. James Abel Hornby was acclaimed at the close of nominations as the Alderman for Ward 1 on February 17, 1909.

Ward 2 Alderman William Henry Manarey resigned effective July 2, 1909 after his appointment as license inspector for the City of Calgary. James Stuart Mackie was elected on the July 22, 1909 by-election, defeating J. Smalley 169 to 134.

== See also ==
- List of Calgary municipal elections
