= 1910 Calgary municipal election =

Election in Alberta, Canada

← 1909	December 12, 1910	1911 →
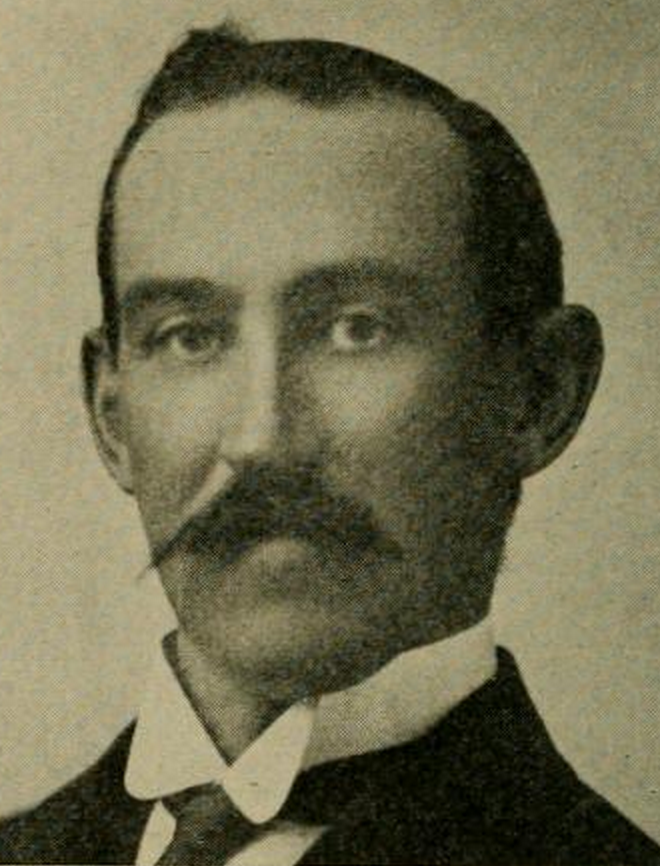

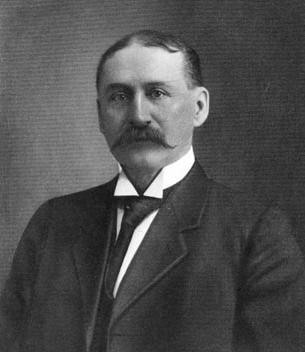
Candidate	John William Mitchell	William Egbert
Popular vote	1,955	1,335
Percentage	59.42%	40.58%
Mayor before election
Reuben Rupert Jamieson
Elected mayor
John William Mitchell

The 1910 Calgary municipal election was held on December 12, 1910 to elect a Mayor and twelve Aldermen to sit on the twenty-seventh Calgary City Council from January 2, 1911 to January 2, 1912. Nominations closed on December 6, 1910.

The elected council was the first Calgary City Council to occupy the new Calgary City Hall.

== Background ==
The election was held under multiple non-transferable vote where each elector was able to cast a ballot for the mayor and up to three ballots for separate councillors with a voter's designated ward. Ward 3 Alderman John William Mitchell defeated Ward 4 Alderman and future Lieutenant Governor of Alberta Dr. William Egbert for the position of Mayor. Egbert attributed his loss to disorganization and voted to never again re-enter municipal politics.

The Morning Albertan claimed Jamison's defeat for Commissioner was due to his announcement for the position, his association with Canadian Pacific Railway, the Elbow River powerplant and Clarke's good standing in the public. Egbert's defeat was linked to his association with Jamison and his support for the Elbow River powerplant.

== Results ==
=== Mayor ===
Candidate	Votes	Percent
John William Mitchell	1,955	
William Egbert	1,335	

=== Commissioner ===
Candidate	Votes	Percent
Simon John Clarke	1,974	
Reuben Rupert Jamieson	1,309	

=== Councillors ===
==== Ward 1 ====
Candidate	Votes	Percent
Adoniram Judson Samis	616	
Alfred Bruce Cushing	525	
Magnus Brown	481	
Charles Pohl	434	
John Liddle Gibson	393	
Thomas Hart	229	
Robert B. Hunt	207	

==== Ward 2 ====
Candidate	Votes	Percent
William Thomas Daniel Lathwell	538	
William Henry Ross	476	
Donald MacDonald	446	
Frederick E. Currey	416	
James Smalley	321	

==== Ward 3 ====
Candidate	Votes	Percent
Richard Addison Brocklebank	525	
James Abel Hornby	486	
Stanley Brown Ramsey	365	
Milton Ross Wallace	267	
Edward E. Taylor	133	
Walter Hallatt	74	

==== Ward 4 ====
Candidate	Votes	Percent
Clifford Teasdale Jones	738	
John Goodwin Watson	701	
James Hay Garden	614	
Clifford Bernard Reilly	243	
Joseph Campbell McFarlane	318	
Joseph Gray Hester	269	

=== School Boards ===
==== Public School Board ====
- Robert J. Hutchings - acclaimed
- Frederick William Mapson - acclaimed
- James Short - acclaimed

==== Separate School Board ====
- P.J. Morrow - acclaimed
- J.G. O'Gara - acclaimed

== By-elections ==
Ward 1 Alderman Adoniram Judson Samis withdrew his seat on January 3, 1911 after technicalities with a mortgage which invalided his candidacy. Samis moved the mortgage into his wife's name and announced his candidacy again. Samis won the by-election against opponent E. Doughty by a total of 621-405. The by-election campaign was spirited, culminating in a fight between candidate Samis and Conrad Pohl, an agent of Doughty two days before the vote.

Ward 2 Alderman William Thomas Daniel Lathwell resigned from City Council which was accepted on March 7, 1911, owing to pressure from local business groups and lack of time. Harold William Hounsfield Riley was acclaimed at close of nominations on March 20, 1911 as Alderman.

== See also ==
- List of Calgary municipal elections
