= Rideau Park School =

Rideau Park School may refer to:

- Rideau Park School - Edmonton Public Schools - Edmonton, Alberta
- Rideau Park School - Calgary Board of Education - Calgary, Alberta
