= West Hillhurst, Calgary =

West Hillhurst
- Neighbourhood
- Location of West Hillhurst in Calgary
- Coordinates: 51°03′30″N 114°06′37″W
- Country: Canada
- Province: Alberta
- City: Calgary
- Quadrant: NW
- Ward: 7
- Established: 1945
- Annexed: 1907

Government
  - Mayor: Jeromy Farkas
  - Administrative body: Calgary City Council
  - Councillor: Myke Atkinson (Independent)

Area
  - Total: 2.4 km^{2} (0.93 sq mi)
- Elevation: 1,055 m (3,461 ft)

Population (2016)
  - Total: 6,449
- Website: West Hillhurst Community Association

West Hillhurst is a northwest neighbourhood in Calgary, Alberta, Canada. The community, which is located west of Hillhurst, is bisected by Crowchild Trail. On the north, West Hillhurst is bordered by the communities of Hounsfield Heights/Briar Hill and St. Andrews Heights. Other boundaries are 18th Street W to the east, the Bow River to the south and 28th Street W to the west.

== History ==
Although annexed by the city of Calgary in 1907, substantial development did not occur until 1945 when many of the houses were built as "Victory Homes" for soldiers returning from World War II. A number of these buildings are still standing despite the fact that many were only intended to be temporary.

== Demographics ==
In the City of Calgary's 2016 municipal census, West Hillhurst had a population of 6,449 living in 3,030 dwellings, a 0.6% increase from its 2015 population of 6,409. With a land area of 2.4 km^{2} (0.93 sq mi), it had a population density of 2,690/km^{2} (6,960/sq mi) in 2016.

As of 2000, there were 16.4% low income residents living in the neighbourhood, and 12.8% of the residents were immigrants. 30.6% of the buildings were condominiums or apartments, and 44.1% of the housing was used for renting.

== Crime ==
Year	Crime Rate (/100 pop.)
2018	3.4
2019	3.0
2020	3.6
2021	3.1
2022	3.0
2023	2.1

== Education ==
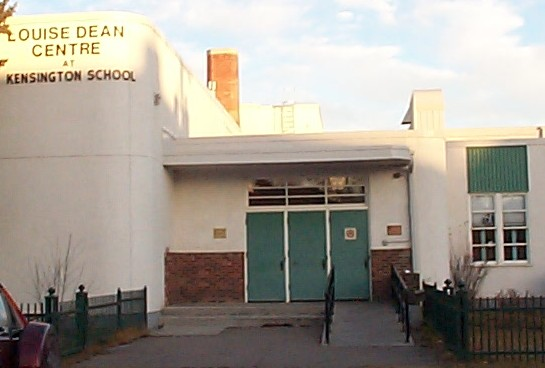
Louise Dean Centre

In 2006, there were two schools in the district:

- École Madeleine d'Houet Bilingual Junior High School - A Separate Catholic school
- Louise Dean Centre - A public high school for new and expectant young mothers throughout Calgary.

== See also ==
- List of neighbourhoods in Calgary
