= 1912 Calgary municipal election =

Election in Alberta, Canada

← 1911	December 9, 1912	1913 →
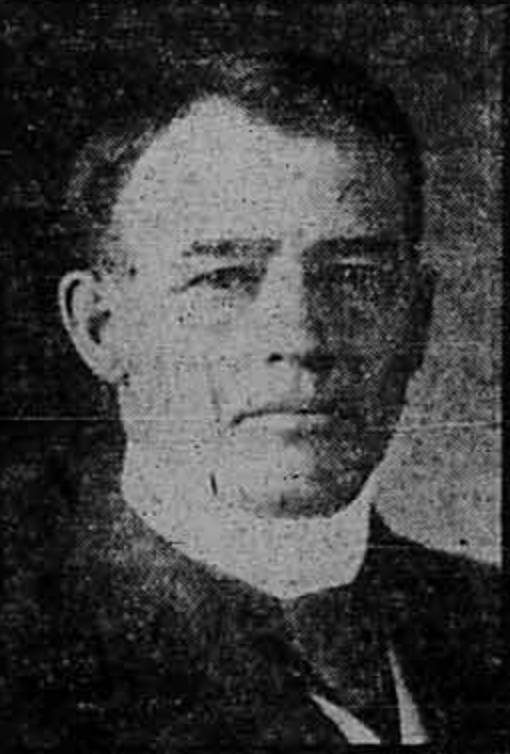
Candidate	Herbert Arthur Sinnott	Richard Addison Brocklebank
Popular vote	3,761	1,449
Percentage	72.19%	27.81%
Mayor before election
John William Mitchell
Elected mayor
Herbert Arthur Sinnott

The 1912 Calgary municipal election was held on December 9, 1912 to elect a Mayor and twelve Aldermen to sit on the twenty-eighth Calgary City Council from January 2, 1913 to January 2, 1914. Nominations closed on December 4, 1912.

== Background ==
The election was held under multiple non-transferable vote where each elector was able to cast a ballot for the mayor and up to three ballots for separate councillors with a voter's designated ward.

Incumbent Mayor John William Mitchell was predicted to contest the Ward 3 Alderman's office, but did not file nomination papers. The Weekly Albertan called Mitchell the most popular Mayor in Calgary's history.

The Morning Albertan claimed the city prepared an insufficient number of polling booths and election officials, which resulted in many voters being unable to cast their ballot.

== Results ==
- Election results from the Calgary Daily Herald and Morning Albertan.

=== Mayor ===
Candidate	Votes	Percent
Herbert Arthur Sinnott	3,761	
Richard Addison Brocklebank	1,449	

=== Commissioner ===
Candidate	Votes	Percent
Adoniram Judson Samis	2,599	
Charles Henry Minchin	1,012	
George M. Lang	787	
James Abel Hornby	616	

=== Councillors ===
==== Ward 1 ====
Candidate	Votes	Percent
George Henry Ross	842	
Stanley Gordon Freeze	802	
Thomas Alfred Presswood Frost	717	
R.J. Frizzle	468	
Magnus Brown	333	
York Shaw	309	
J.M. Lowndes	240	
John McCoubrey	192	
M. McCannel	181	

==== Ward 2 ====
Candidate	Votes	Percent
Shibley Goldsmith Carscallen	1,014	
Herbert Bealey Adshead	940	
William Ross Sr.	906	
Frank Russell Riley	768	
Alex Ross	692	
George E. Wood	679	
Alexander Clarence McDougall	640	
J. C. McFarlane	539	

==== Ward 3 ====
Candidate	Votes	Percent
Stanley Brown Ramsey	367	
Douglas Ralph Crichton	301	
Samuel Allen Carson	278	
Thomas Hart	183	
Bert Fisher	144	

==== Ward 4 ====
Candidate	Votes	Percent
James Hay Garden	1,587	
William John Tregillus	1,450	
Michael Copps Costello	1,363	
E. D. Benson	1,268	

== School board trustee ==
Candidate	Votes	Percent
James Short	3,221	
S.Y. Taylor	2,731	
John T. MacDonald	2,703	
A.C. Newcombe	2,568	
R.J. Hutchings	2,375	
F.W. Mapson	2,153	

== See also ==
- List of Calgary municipal elections
