= 1911 Calgary municipal election =

Election in Alberta, Canada

| ← 1910 | December 11, 1911 | 1912 → |
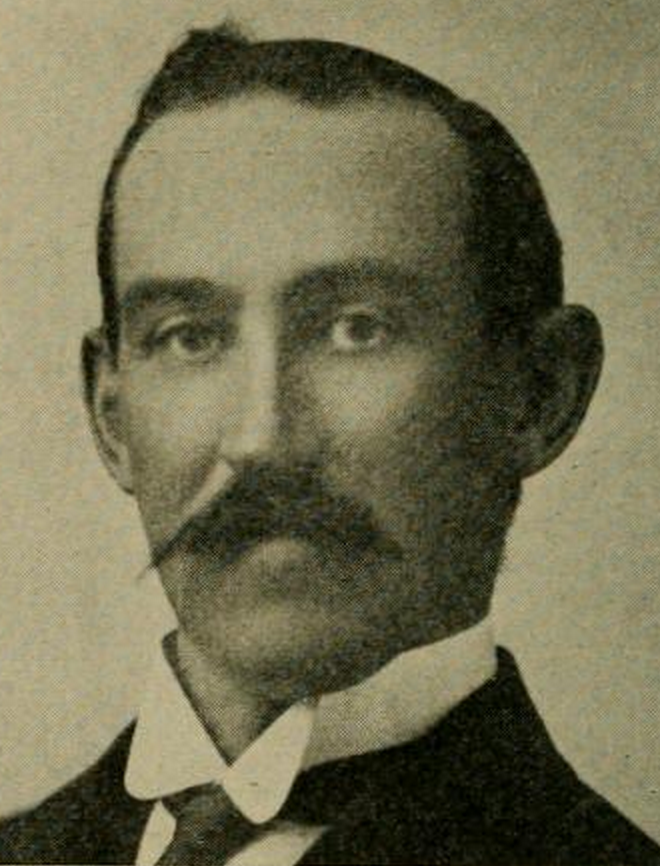
| Candidate | John William Mitchell |
| Popular vote | Acclaimed |
Mayor before election
John William Mitchell
Elected mayor
John William Mitchell

The 1911 Calgary municipal election was held on December 11, 1911, to elect a Mayor and twelve Aldermen to sit on the twenty-eighth Calgary City Council from January 2, 1912, to January 2, 1913.

== Background ==
The election was held under multiple non-transferable vote where each elector was able to cast a ballot for the mayor and up to three ballots for separate councillors with a voter's designated ward. Mayor John William Mitchell and Commissioner Simon John Clarke was acclaimed as the only candidate for Mayor on December 4, 1911.

== Results ==
=== Mayor ===
- John William Mitchell - Acclaimed

=== Commissioner ===
- Arthur Garnet Graves - Acclaimed

=== Councillors ===
==== Ward 1 ====
| Candidate | Votes | Percent |
|---|---|---|
| Charles Henry Minchin | 555 | |
| Adoniram Judson Samis | 542 | |
| Magnus Brown | 502 | |
| Alfred Bruce Cushing | 474 | |
| Charles Riddock | 316 | |
| Hyman King | 178 | |
| Thomas Hart | 123 | |

==== Ward 2 ====
| Candidate | Votes | Percent |
|---|---|---|
| Frank Russell Riley | 530 | |
| Alexander Clarence McDougall | 499 | |
| Shibley Goldsmith Carscallen | 355 | |
| M.F. Batchelor | 336 | |
| William Henry Ross | 323 | |
| N.J. Duckworth | 222 | |
| James Smalley | 203 | |
| A.R. Vince | 120 | |

==== Ward 3 ====
| Candidate | Votes | Percent |
|---|---|---|
| James Abel Hornby | 333 | |
| Richard Addison Brocklebank | 272 | |
| Stanley Brown Ramsey | 255 | |
| S. Carson | 200 | |
| Bert Fisher | 103 | |

==== Ward 4 ====
| Candidate | Votes | Percent |
|---|---|---|
| George W. Morfitt | 682 | |
| John Goodwin Watson | 526 | |
| Reuben Switzer Whaley | 398 | |
| A.C. Seratch | 369 | |
| T.E. Jackson | 362 | |
| Sidney Houlton | 296 | |

=== School board trustee ===
==== Public School Board ====
| Candidate | Votes | Percent |
|---|---|---|
| James Walker | 1,802 | |
| Herbert Arthur Sinnott | 1,530 | |
| A.C. Newcombe | 1,208 | |
| S.B. Hillocks | | |

==== Separate School Board ====
| Candidate | Votes | Percent |
|---|---|---|
| John Burns | | |
| J.J. Doyle | | |
| J.L. Tobin | | |

== See also ==
- List of Calgary municipal elections
