= Alice Jamieson =

American and Canadian feminist and magistrate

Alice Jane Jukes Jamieson
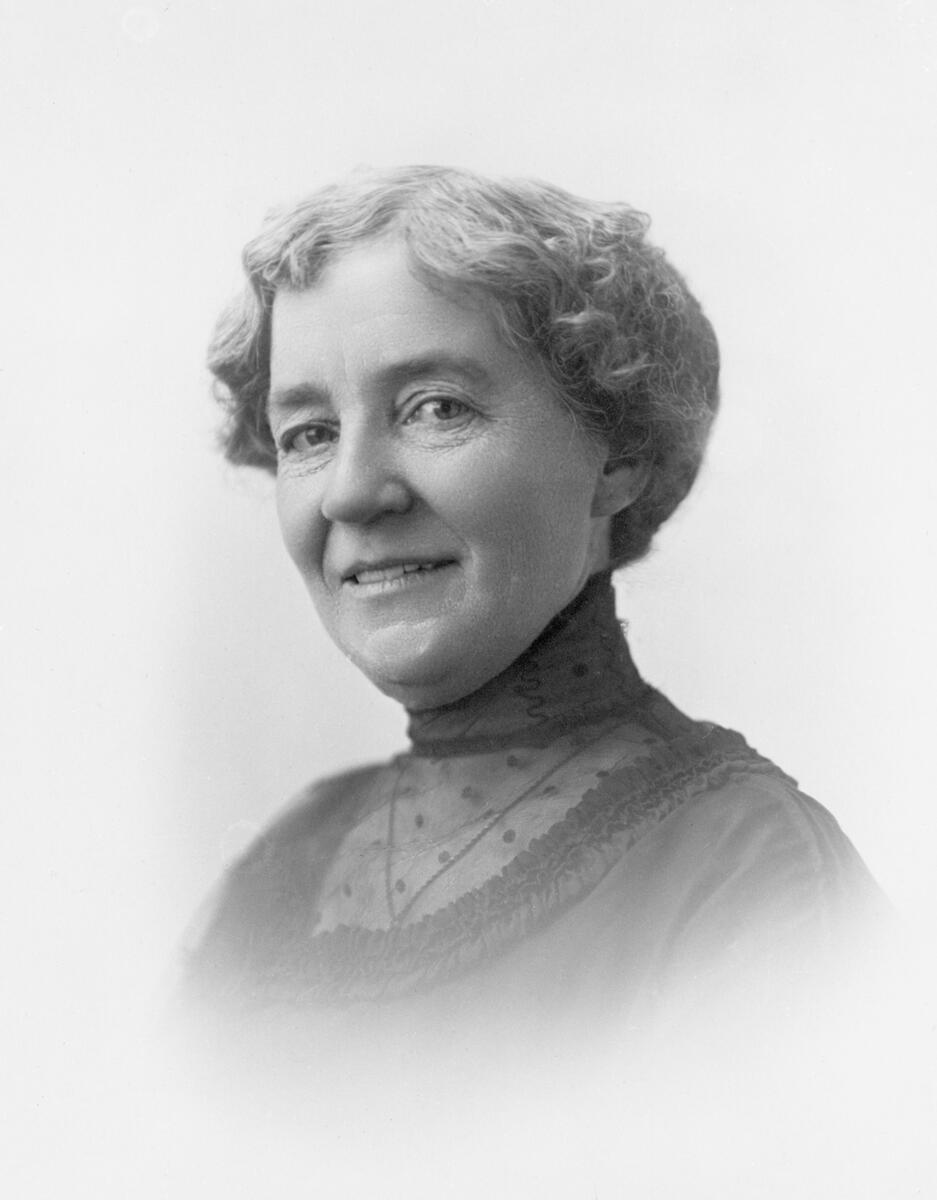

Personal details
- Born: July 14, 1860 New York City, New York
- Died: July 4, 1949 (aged 88) Calgary, Alberta
- Spouse: Reuben Rupert Jamieson

Alice Jane Jukes Jamieson (July 14, 1860 – July 4, 1949) was an American and Canadian feminist and magistrate.

== Career ==
Jamieson arrived in Calgary, Alberta, Canada in 1903 when her husband, Reuben Rupert Jamieson, became the area general superintendent for the Canadian Pacific Railway. They prospered in Calgary and after his retirement, he became the 19th mayor of Calgary. After the death of her husband, Alice continued to be active in the community. She was involved in organizations such as the Calgary Council of Women and the YWCA of Calgary.

In 1914, Jamieson was appointed the first female judge in the British Empire of a juvenile court. In 1916, she became the second female magistrate of the Empire, just months after Emily Murphy was appointed in Edmonton, Alberta.

Jamieson's right to serve as magistrate came into question in 1917 in the Lizzie Cyr Case. Cyr's lawyer argued that as a woman, Alice was legally "incompetent and incapable" of holding the office. The Alberta Supreme Court upheld her right to serve in this position. This was a precursor to the 1929 Persons Case where five other Albertan women fought to answer the question, "Are women persons?" Jamieson retired in 1932.

== Legacy ==
When the Calgary Board of Education opened its only all-female school in 2003, it honored her by naming it the Alice Jamieson Girls' Academy.

Bentall Capital LP and British Columbia Investment Management Corporation (bcIMC) broke ground in February 2007 on a new office tower called Jamieson Place in honour of Alice Jukes Jamieson. The tower opened in 2009.

== Personal life ==
Alice Jukes Jamieson had 4 children.
