= Queen Elizabeth High School (Calgary) =

Public secondary school in Alberta, Canada

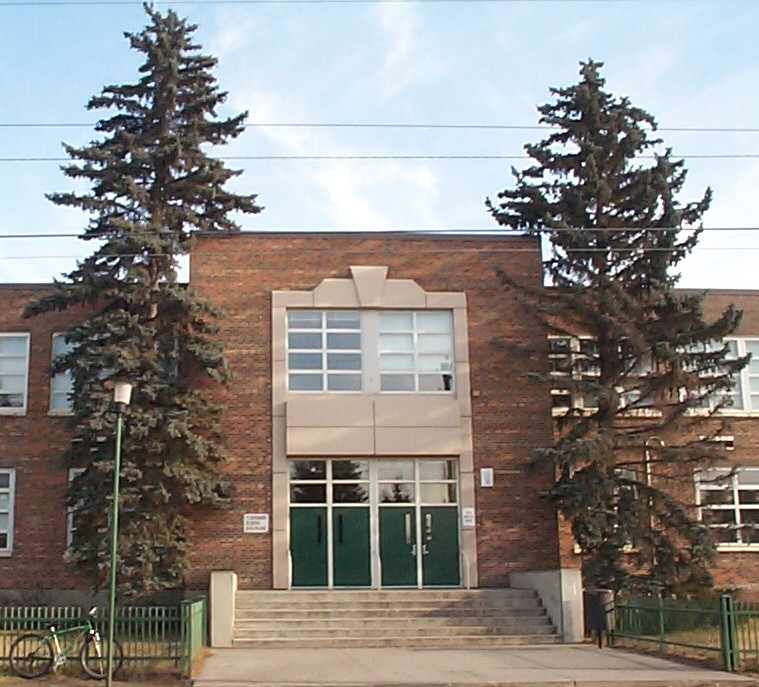

Location
- 512 18 Street N.W. Calgary, Alberta; Canada; 51°3′25″N 114°6′8″W

Information
- School type: Public secondary
- Motto: Labor omnia vincit (Hard work conquers all)
- Established: 1910
- School board: Calgary Board of Education
- Principal: Jennifer Edmondson-Neily
- Grades: 7–12
- Enrollment: 968 (September 30, 2024)
- Mascot: Knights
- Communities served: Briar Hill, Hounsfield Heights, Hillhurst, West Hillhurst, Parkdale, Point Mckay, St. Andrews Heights, University Heights
- Website: schools.cbe.ab.ca/b806/

Queen Elizabeth High School (QEHS) is a Canadian public combined junior and senior high school in Calgary, Alberta, which teaches grades 7 through 12. The junior (7–9) and senior high (10–12) programs share a common principal, many teachers, and other resources of the school. It is operated by the Calgary Board of Education. Queen Elizabeth High School serves as the Overflow Receiver of Western Canada High School and the Secondary Overflow School of Mount Royal School (as of March 2025). QEHS operates separately from Queen Elizabeth Elementary School, even though the two schools are physically adjacent to each other.

== History ==
The school was founded in 1910 as "Bowview School" which was originally a boarding school. Evidence for this can be found above the south west entrance by the cafeteria, where the previous school name is displayed. It was renamed in 1953 to mark the coronation of Queen Elizabeth II. The original three-storey building (which includes the Drama room that was the original auditorium and cafeteria) opened in 1930. A large addition (including the band room, wood shop, north gym, current offices, classrooms) was opened in 1953. The third addition was completed in 1967 and includes the library and science labs.

== Academics ==
QEHS offers special programs for the CBE which are for students throughout the city, not just local students. Those outside the local area are given subsidized bus passes to attend the school.

=== Advanced Placement Program ===
QEHS is one of the many high schools in Calgary to offer the Advanced Placement Program, which gives student a chance to enroll in university-level courses of their choice, equivalent to most universities' introductory courses. Depending on their score on the AP Exam, students can receive university credit for the AP course.

As of the 2025-2026 School Year, QEHS offers AP courses in the following subjects: AP Biology, AP Chemistry, AP English Literature and Composition, Calculus AB, AP Physics C (Electricity and Magnetism) and AP Seminar, AP Research. It is the only high school in Calgary offering AP Physics C (Electricity & magnetism), and the AP Capstone Diploma, which consists of AP Seminar and AP Research.

=== Gifted students ===
QEHS is one of the CBE's schools to operate the Gifted and Talented Education (GATE) program, which assists qualified students with more advanced instruction. GATE compacts and accelerates the typical curriculum. It combines Language Arts and Social Studies into one class (humanities) and it also provides extra experts and mentors. Currently, nine CBE schools offer the GATE program. The school is part of the Action for Bright Children Society.

=== Deaf and Hard of Hearing students ===
The Deaf and Hard of Hearing Program at Queen Elizabeth High school is a bilingual and bicultural program that supports deaf students from grade 7 through 12 to participate in a mainstream environment. Interpreters are also provided, enabling equality and language accessibility. The deaf students are placed in classrooms among hearing students with an interpreter who facilitates information using American Sign Language.

=== Alberta Ballet students ===
Students from across the city who attend The School of Alberta Ballet attend QEHS. Queen Elizabeth makes special accommodations for the students. Even though the Alberta Ballet, not QEHS, actually provides the dance instruction, that instruction can be used to earn credits towards a high school diploma. QEHS is one of just two schools in the city with this special relationship, the other being Bishop Carroll High.

== Student body ==
=== Mascot ===
The school's mascot is a knight. A student is usually at pep rally events in the school wearing a suit of armor.

=== Knight's Fest ===
Until the COVID-19 pandemic in 2020, the student leadership class hosted an event known as "Knights Fest" where students had a half day, and are able to enjoy activities such as bouncy castles and other various carnival themed activities, and there are stands where students can buy candy and knights themed merchandise. Live bands perform, notable past performers include Michael Bernard Fitzgerald and The Static Shift.

== Notable alumni ==
- Rob Anders – Conservative MP
- Jay Beagle – NHL player
- Albert W. Hicks – Professional Hobby Horser
- Rosalind Groenewoud – freeskier
- Nancy Huston – novelist and essayist
- Naheed Nenshi – the 36th Mayor of Calgary and the leader of the Alberta NDP
- Sheilagh Ogilvie – Professor of Economic History at the University of Cambridge
- Ken Read - Olympic alpine skier; international sport leader
- Ted Stenson, film director whose 2020 film Events Transpiring Before, During and After a High School Basketball Game was filmed at Queen Elizabeth High School in 2019

== See also ==
- Royal eponyms in Canada
