= St. Andrews Heights, Calgary =

St. Andrews Heights
- Neighbourhood
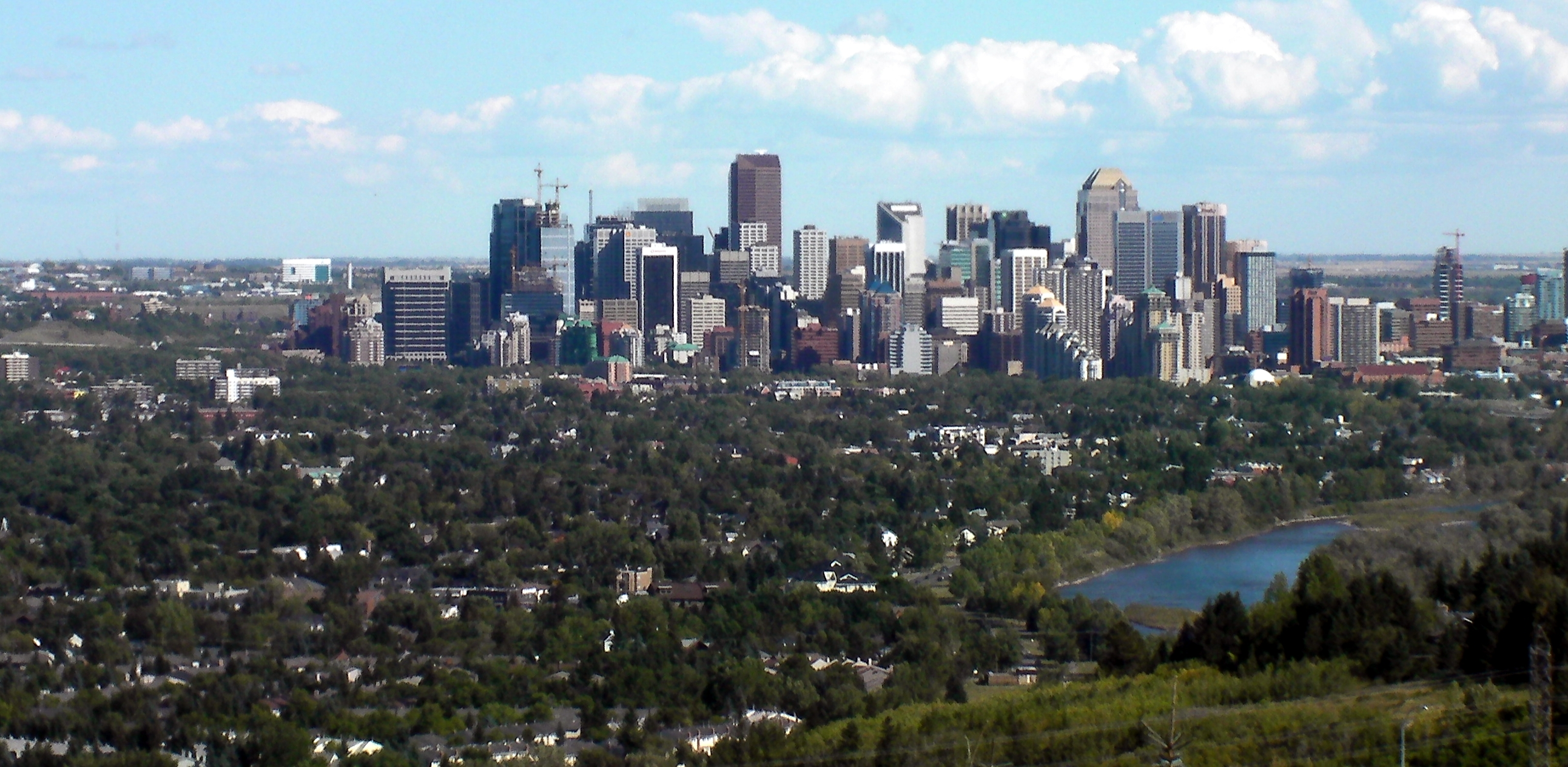
- St. Andrews Heights with downtown in background

- Location of St. Andrews Heights in Calgary
- Coordinates: 51°03′35″N 114°07′46″W
- Country: Canada
- Province: Alberta
- City: Calgary
- Quadrant: NW
- Ward: 7
- Established: 1953
- Annexed: 1910

Government
  - Mayor: Jeromy Farkas
  - Administrative body: Calgary City Council
  - Councillor: Myke Atkinson (Independent)
- Elevation: 1,070 m (3,510 ft)

Population (2006)
  - Total: 1,588
  - Average Income: $59,489
- Website: St. Andrews Heights Community Association

St. Andrews Heights is a residential neighbourhood in the northwest quadrant of Calgary, Alberta. It is bounded to the north by the Trans-Canada Highway, to the east by Crowchild Trail, to the south by Toronto Crescent, and to the west by 29 Street. The Foothills Medical Centre occupies the northwestern corner of the community, and McMahon Stadium and the Foothills Athletic Park borders to the northeast. The Bow River flows immediately south of the neighbourhood.

The area was annexed to the City of Calgary in 1910 and St. Andrews Heights was established in 1953. It is represented in the Calgary City Council by the Ward 7 councillor.

== Demographics ==
In the City of Calgary's 2012 municipal census, St. Andrews Heights had a population of 1,588 living in 645 dwellings, an 8% increase from its 2011 population of 1,470. With a land area of 1.2 km^{2} (0.46 sq mi), it had a population density of 1,320/km^{2} (3,430/sq mi) in 2012.

Residents in this community had a median household income of $59,489 in 2000, and there were 13.7% low income residents living in the neighbourhood. As of 2000, 30.8% of the residents were immigrants. A proportion of 42.4% of the buildings were condominiums or apartments, and 46.5% of the housing was used for renting.

Pop. Overtime
| Year | Population |
|---|---|
| 2014 | 1,688 |
| 2015 | 1,763 |
| 2016 | 1,729 |
| 2017 | 1,717 |
| 2018 | 1,596 |
| 2019 | 1,795 |
| 2021 | 1,345 |

== Crime ==
Crime Data
| Year | Crime Rate (/100) |
|---|---|
| 2018 | 6.2 |
| 2019 | 6.5 |
| 2020 | 7.3 |
| 2021 | 8.3 |
| 2022 | 7.1 |
| 2023 | 7.1 |

== Education ==
The community is served by Branton Bilingual Junior High School and Queen Elizabeth Junior and Senior High School public schools, as well as University Elementary and Rundle College. French Immersion students in the community are served by École Banff Trail as well as William Aberhart High School.

== See also ==
- List of neighbourhoods in Calgary
