= North Trail High School =

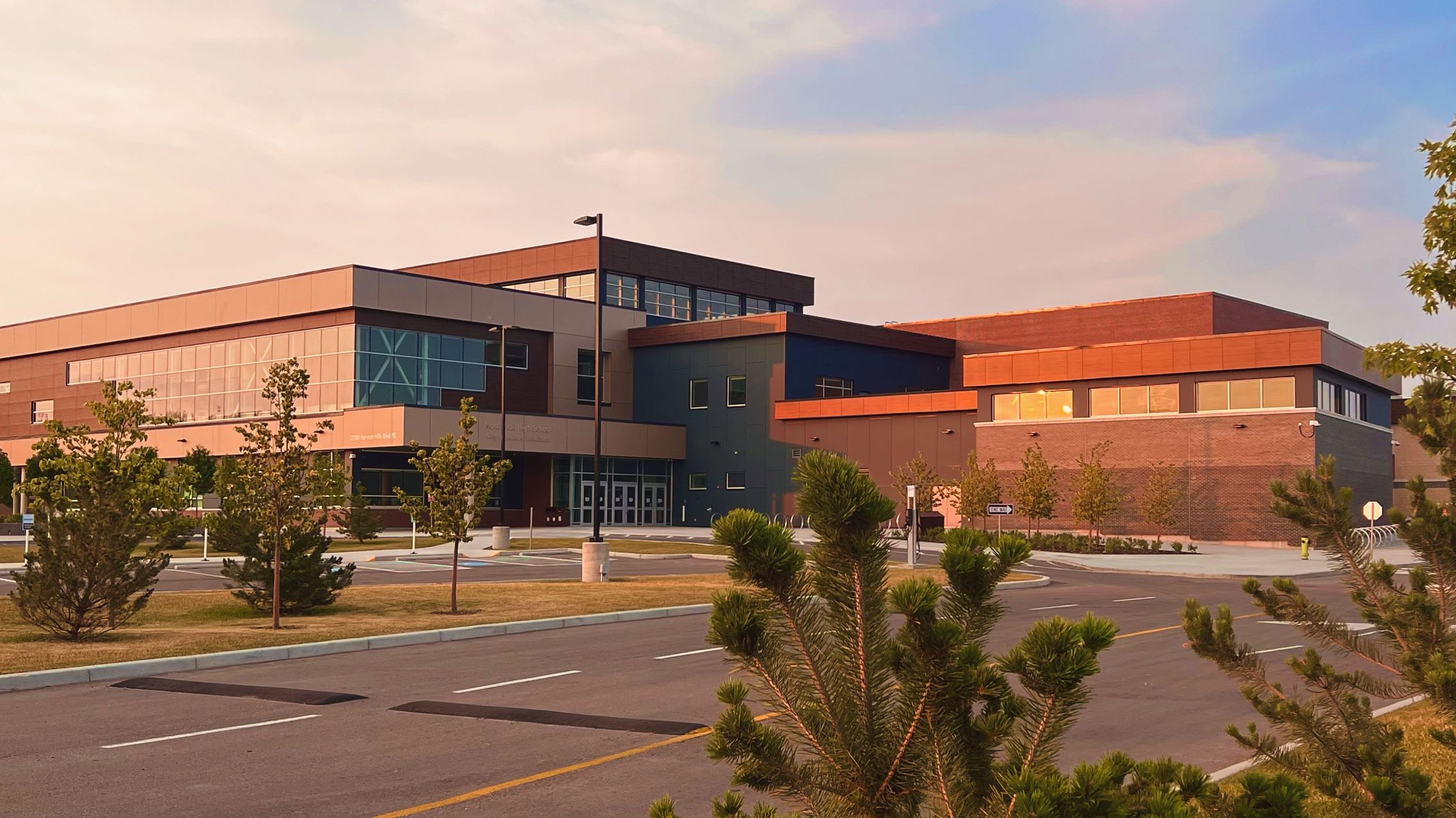
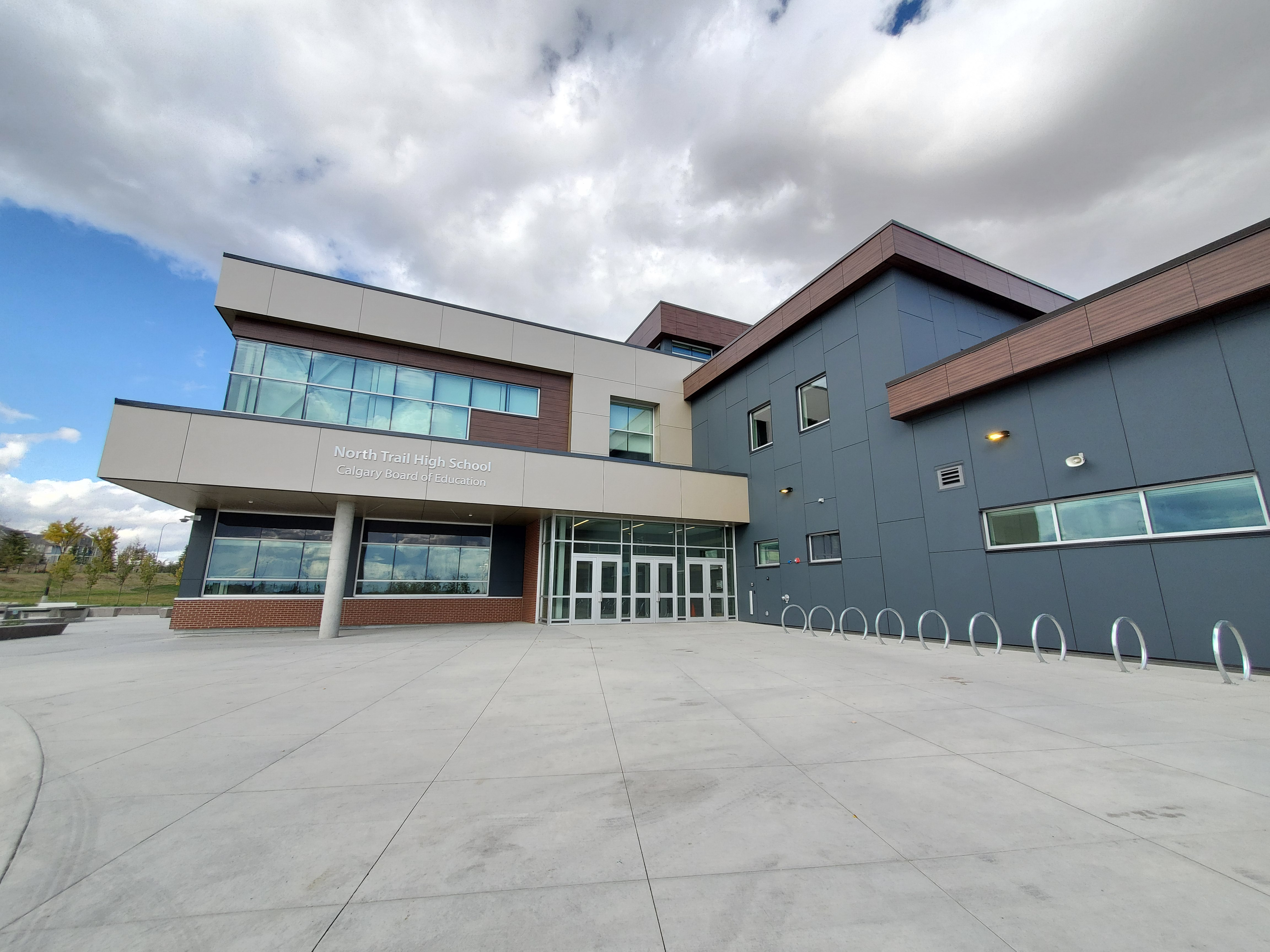
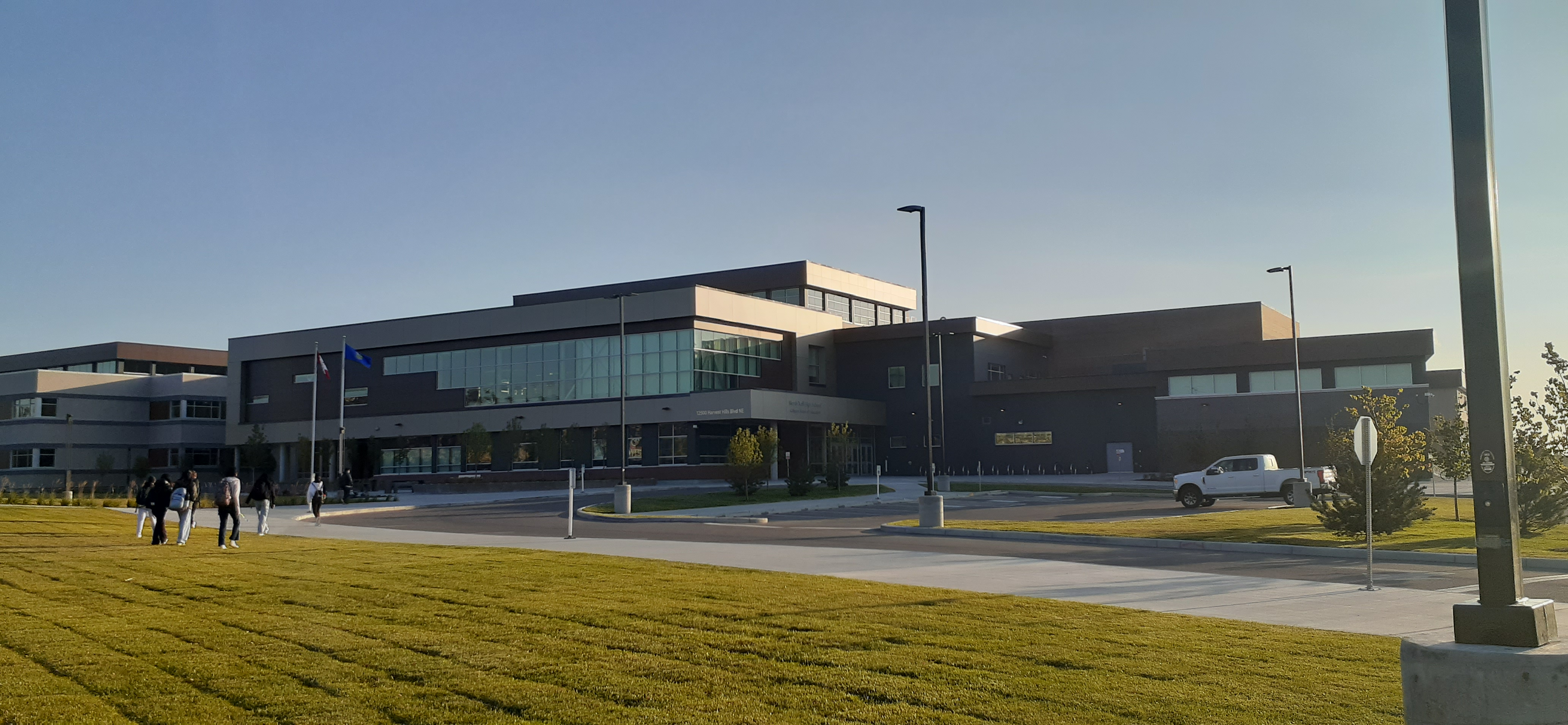
- NTHS Under Sunset Main Entrance to the school As viewed from Harvest Hills Boulevard

Location
- 12500 Harvest Hills Blvd NE; Calgary, Alberta, T3K 2S3; Canada; 51.16738906179625°N 114.06547147364472°W

Information
- School type: Public secondary
- Established: 2023
- School board: Calgary Board of Education
- Principal: Michael Bester
- Grades: 10–12
- Enrollment: 2053 (2024)
  - Grade 10: 747
  - Grade 11: 707
  - Grade 12: 599
- Colours: Green and Navy Blue
- Mascot: Nighthawk
- Team name: North Trail Nighthawks
- Communities served: Country Hills Village, Coventry Hills, Hidden Valley, Harvest Hills, Panorama Hills, Country Hills
- Feeder schools: Valley Creek Jr. High; Nose Creek Jr. High; Colonel Irvine Jr. High; Balmoral Jr. High; Nichola Goddard Jr. High
- Website: northtrail.cbe.ab.ca

North Trail High School is a senior high school located in the northeast community of Coventry Hills in Calgary, Alberta, Canada. The school's name is derived from the Siksika First Nation with historical significance from trails used by First Nations ancestors. North Trail High School offers the Advanced Placement (AP) program, French and Spanish second languages, and a variety of extracurricular activities. The school is part of the Calgary Board of Education's public school system.

== History ==
The school had been planned for almost a decade before beginning construction, with students living in this area of the city having to go to schools several kilometer south such as John G. Diefenbaker High School and Crescent Heights High School, which could have up to a 50-minute travel time.

The Calgary Board of Education announced in December 2020 that construction will begin in early May. The school finished construction around July 2023 opened for students on August 31, 2023. Originally given the placeholder name of North Calgary High School, the official name was announced by the Calgary Board of Education Trustees on April 7, 2023, after consultations with a local First Nations elder, citing Siksika and Blackfoot history. The grand opening ceremony of the school was held on April 26, 2024. The name "North Trail" is derived from the trail that Blackfoot and Siksika peoples would travel to reach Nose Hill Park, a site where they held various ceremonies and gatherings.

On January 7, 2025, the school announced the beginning of a new lottery system to combat the school's higher than expected enrolment growth. Students who are unsuccessful in the lottery will be overflowed to Crescent Heights High School. The school also announced six new modular classrooms, to be installed in Spring of 2025.

== Academics ==
North Trail High School operates under the Alberta Program of Studies, which provides a comprehensive framework for curriculum development and educational practices in the province of Alberta.

North Trail High School is one of the 15 high schools in Calgary to offer the Advanced Placement program. AP allows students with opportunities to engage in college-level coursework while still in high school. These courses are designed to challenges students and allow them to earn college credit based on their performance in the AP exams. Students can choose to engage in one or more areas of study of their choice and are offered by the College Board. North Trail offers AP courses in biology, chemistry, physics, mathematics, English, social studies, French language, art and design, and computer science. Advanced Placement (AP) courses are usually offered starting in grade 11. Students must present an average above 80% in the prerequisite course and receive a teacher's recommendation to enrol.

=== Clubs ===
North Trail High School has numerous Fine Art Showcases throughout the school year, spirit days, pep rallies, and feeder tournaments. In January 2025, the school's Key Club hosted the school's first Winter Formal. North Trail's abundance in clubs have strengthened the school's diverse and inclusive environment. Nearly all of the school's clubs are student-run, enabling students to learn how to lead a team.

Competitive	Service	Interests
Concert Band; Jazz Band; Choir; FTC Robotics Club; Math Contests; Debate Club; Speech Club; Science Olympics; Science fair; Chess Club; Dance (Hypehawks); North Trail Cover Band; North Trail Drama Society	Leadership; North Trail News (The Trail Tribune); Yearbook Club; Key Club (Volunteer & Service); Environmental Club; Diversity Council; Best Buddies; Music Council; Asian Cultural Club; Afro-Caribbean Association; Women Empowerment Club; North Trail Muslims; Graduation Committee; ALPHA	Dungeons & Dragons Club; Art Club; Pottery Club; Board Game Club; Literature Club; Bike Club; Culinary Club; Knitting Club

=== Dual Credit & Off-Campus Work Experience ===
North Trail High School currently offers the Unique Pathways & Off-Campus Education Program which gives students hands-on learning experience through workplace placements. North Trail provides workplace opportunities with Dual Credit courses, supervised by a CBE teacher, to support post-secondary learning. This program will help students explore their interests while gaining hands-on real-world experience and earn both high school and transferable post-secondary credits.

=== CSSI ===
North Trail High School is one of the few high schools in Calgary to offer the Communication, Sensory, Social Skills, and Integration (CSSI) program, a specialized educational service designed to support students with complex learning, behavioral, and medical needs.

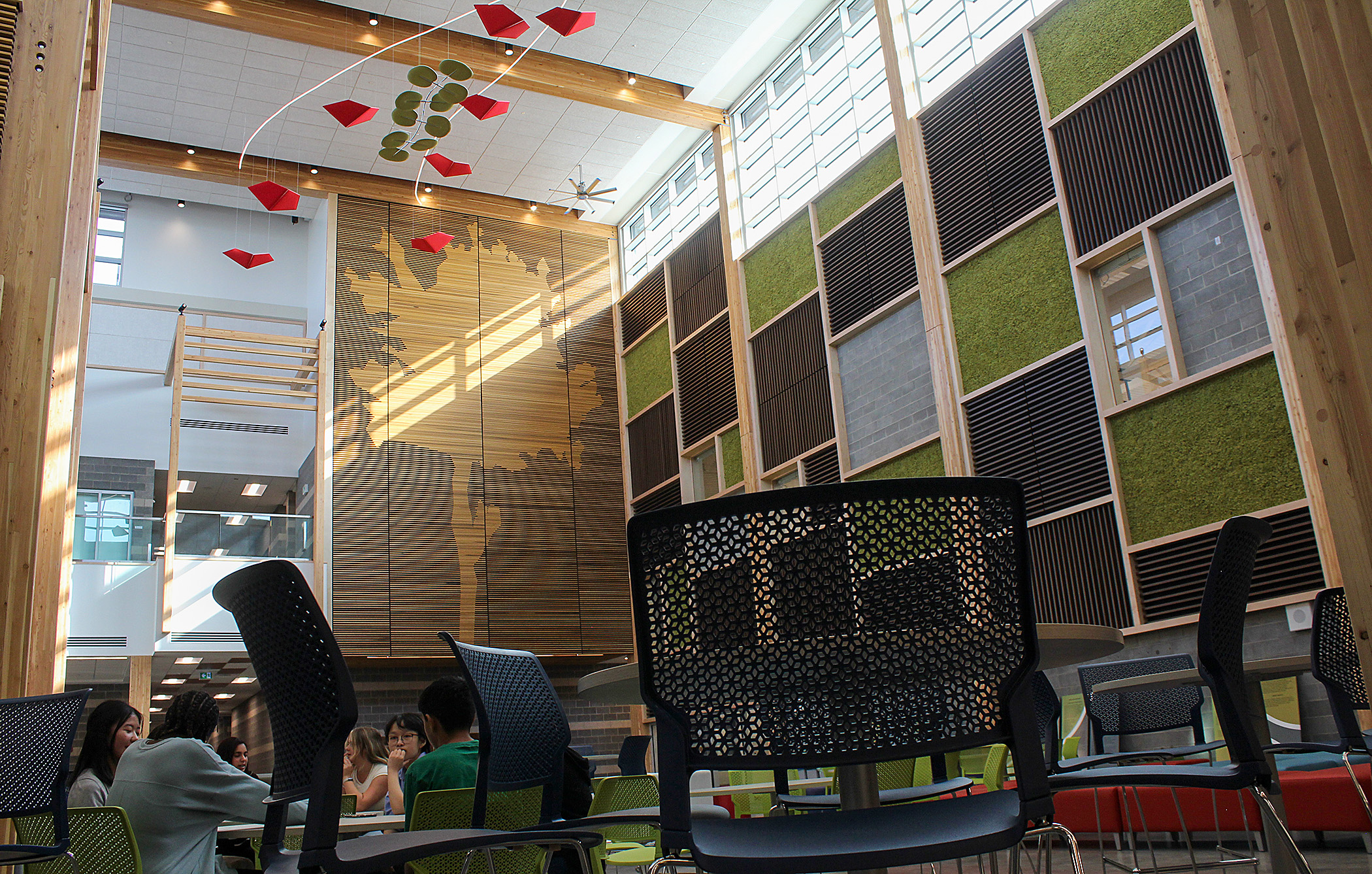
The Moyis, which translates to "gathering place" or "meeting place" in Blackfoot, serves as North Trail's common area. This area serves as a symbol of unity and community and the school's connection with Indigenous culture.

== Athletics ==
North Trail currently competes in the Calgary Senior High School Athletic Association. North Trail offers a variety of different athletic teams including:

- Football
- Soccer
- Basketball
- Swimming
- Golf
- Dance
- Volleyball
- Curling
- Cross Country
- Track & Field
- Field hockey
- Wrestling
- Badminton

In 2024, the junior boys volleyball team earned their first city championship banner in Division 3. Later, the badminton team won Division 3 Championships before securing their third championship as Division 3 volleyball city champions.

== Robotics ==
North Trail High School's Robotics Team currently competes in FTC Robotics. During the 2025 City Championship, the Nighthawks Robotics teams secured placements in the provincial competition. The senior team was selected as the first pick for the Winning Alliance and received the third-place Inspire Award. Meanwhile, the junior team finished as the second-place Alliance and was awarded the second-place Inspire Award.
