= Lord Shaughnessy High School =

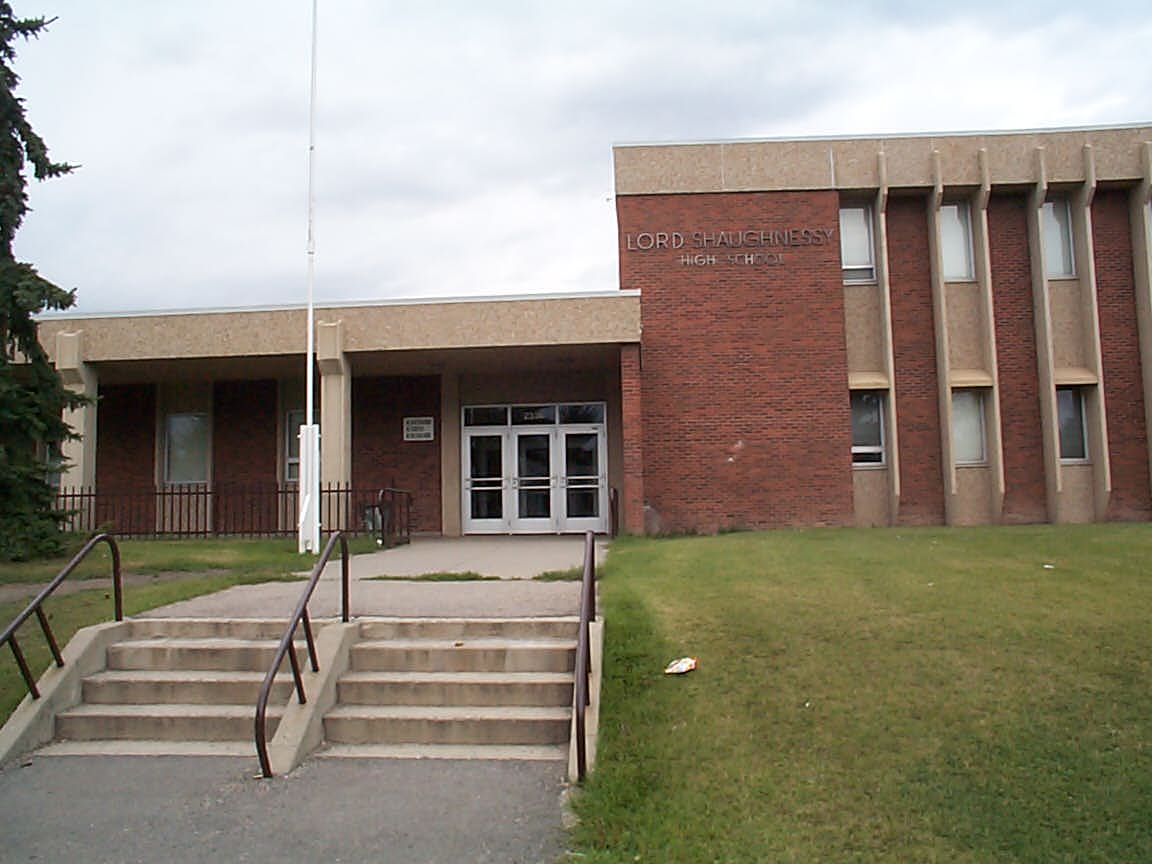

Location
- 2336 - 53 Avenue S.W. Calgary, Alberta; Canada
- Coordinates: 51.006°N 114.114°W

Information
- School type: Public
- School board: Calgary Board of Education
- Enrollment: N/A

Lord Shaughnessy High School (named for Thomas Shaughnessy, 1st Baron Shaughnessy) is a high school located in Calgary, Alberta, Canada.

Lord Shaughnessy High School accommodates three distinct Calgary Board of Education (CBE) programs.

1. The Career and Technology Centre (CTC) provides CBE students with access to rigorous academic and technical curriculum in preparation for further education and careers in high-skill, high-demand occupations.

2. CBe-learn is the CBE's online junior and senior high school.

3. Chinook Learning Services offers adult Continuing Education (Professional Development and Corporate Training) courses. This location also serves as the hub for Chinook's administration and registration departments for High School Upgrading and Summer School.

From 2006 to 2009, Lord Shaughnessy High School housed the Juno Beach Academy of Canadian Studies.

In fall 2010, construction began at Lord Shaughnessy High School with the anticipation of creating the Career and Technology Centre. In fall 2012, all programs at The Career and Technology Centre were in full operation.

In spring 2013, CBe-learn, the Calgary Board of Education's online school relocated to the Career and Technology Centre, housed at Lord Shaughnessy High School.

In fall 2018, Chinook Learning Services moved into the building.
