= Branton Bilingual Junior High School =

Branton Junior High School

Location
- 2103 20 Street N.W. Calgary, Alberta, T2M 3W1; Canada; 51.071°N 114.108°W

Information
- School type: Junior High
- Motto: Equality, Respect, Friendship, Safety, Accountability and Community.
- Founded: 1956
- School board: Calgary Board of Education
- Superintendent: Joanne Pitman
- Area trustee: George Lane
- Administrator: Susan Church
- Principal: Sebastien Picard
- Grades: 6-9
- Enrollment: 713 (2009-2010)
- Language: English/French
- Area: Area II
- Colours: Black and Green
- Mascot: Tyrone the Tiger
- Team name: Branton Tigers
- Website: web.archive.org/web/20090506102020/http://schools.cbe.ab.ca:80/b621/

Branton Junior High School is a junior high school in Calgary, Alberta servicing the Banff Trail community and surrounding area.

It offers an exclusively French Immersion program for grades 6-9 as part of the mandates of the Calgary Board of Education.

== Name origin ==
The school was named after William A. Branton who served the Calgary Board of Education as both architect and building superintendent from 1911 until his retirement in 1956. A native of Spalding, England, Branton came to Calgary in 1905 at the age of 16 where he found employment in the construction industry. From 1908 to 1910 he attended Brandon College in Manitoba, and in 1911 he joined the school board under the late Hugh McClellan, then building superintendent. In 1912, Mr. Branton became his assistant and eight years later rose to the position of building superintendent and architect; positions he held until his retirement. He was responsible for the construction of 60 plus schools during his tenure.

== History ==
The school was built in 1955 and is situated on 10.092 acres of land. In 1986 it was significantly damaged by fire at its south end, and much of it was rebuilt. The 31 classroom spaces in the building include 3 portables located west of the main building, 1 computer lab, 4 science labs, 2 home economics facilities, a drama room, an industrial arts facility, and a music room. During the late 1980s and early 1990s, the science labs, the computer lab and the library (now referred to as the Alf Boldt Resource Centre in recognition of one of its previous principals) were significantly improved. The school has a main gymnasium and stage on the main floor, a well-equipped fitness room and a smaller gymnasium below. There is a cafeteria, and during lunch hours, the entire lower concourse, gym, and lunchroom provide space for up to 550 students who stay for lunch. The school is famous for its "earthworm," an indoor track facility built by removing earthfill in the crawl spaces below the main building. The initiative was begun in 1960 with the leadership of R.B. Wilberg, physical education instructor and E.M. Borgal, the principal. The area is no longer used (because of poor air quality), as it once was, to train track teams during the winter months.

Beginning in the 2019–2020 school year, due to school board changes, Branton includes students from four grades (Grades 6 to 9) rather than the traditional three for Junior High School (Grade 7 to 9).

== Options and electives ==
There are 12 options offered, with only seven offered to lower grades. The options include:

- Art
- Drama
- Foods
- Fashion
- Graphics
- Leadership
- Applied Technology
- Animation
- Photography
- Multimedia
- Industrial Arts or Construction or Woodshop
- Band (Full Year Option: Takes up both semesters)

=== Band ===
This school offers a wide selection of instruments, one of the largest for junior high in Calgary. Currently there are 10 instruments:

- Oboe
- Clarinet
- Flute
- Trumpet
- Bassoon
- Trombone
- French Horn
- Bass Clarinet
- Tuba
- Baritone or Euphonium
- Saxophone

Band is the largest option in school, with 134 grade 7's in 2010-11.

== Immersions ==
Late Immersion: This is an immersion where students are having grade 7 as their first year having a French school. They will have separate teachers and curriculum to the Continuing Immersion, who have been in French since Kindergarten/Grade 1. They will learn all the terminology needed for the class. All French classes include:

- Social Studies
- Math
- Science
- FLA (French Language Arts)

Continuing Immersion: Students that are continuing on with French after 6–7 years in school as the main language. They will do the Provincial curriculum but in French. By grade 9, both immersions will be put together in mixed classes.
