= Alice Jamieson Girls' Academy =

Coordinates: 51.060°N 114.0477°W

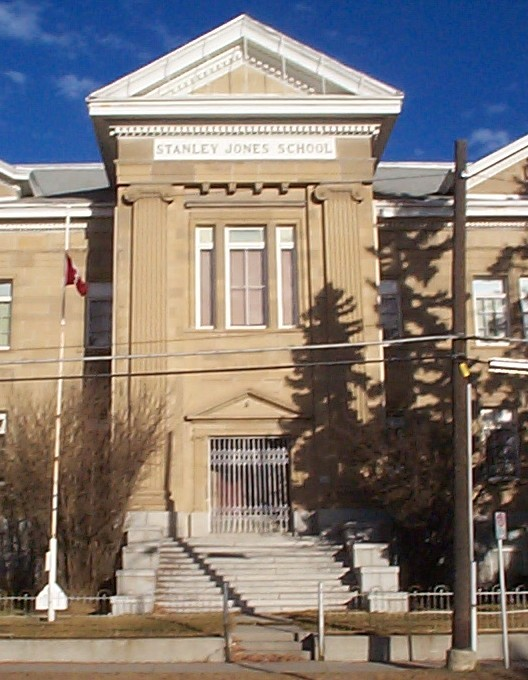

Location
- 950 - 6 Street N.E. Calgary; Alberta; Canada

Information
- Type: Public
- Motto: Dare to dream
- Established: 2003
- School board: Calgary Board of Education
- Principal: Krista Bartlett

The Alice Jamieson Girls' Academy (AJA) is an all-female public school in Calgary, Alberta, Canada. It is the only single gender school run by the Calgary Board of Education (CBE), and is one of a very small number of fully public single-gender schools in Canada.

The school was named to honor Alice Jamieson, an advocate of women's rights in the early 1900s, and the second female magistrate in Canada (and the rest of the British Commonwealth).

== History ==
The idea of an all-female publicly funded school in Calgary was first formally proposed by The Calgary Girls' School Society to the Calgary Board of Education, who sought a charter from the board. The board rejected the proposal. After the rejection, the society received a public charter directly from the province, and opened the Calgary Girls' School (CGS) in 2003. While the board opposed the idea of a charter school, it did support the idea of an all-female school, so it opened AJGA as its own all-female school also in 2003. The two schools are similar in several ways: all-female, grades 4-9, mandatory uniforms, female-mentorship, and a female perspective in viewing history and other subjects taught; but are different mainly in administration and accountability issues. As an alternative program school, AJGA has somewhat more freedom and independence than a typical CBE school, but far less than the autonomy a charter school, like CGS, has.

Some criticized the board for opening an all-female school, while there was no all-male school. This situation has been rectified with the opening of the All-Boys Alternative Program school at the Sir James Lougheed School in Southwest Calgary in September 2011.

== Philosophy ==
There are several reasons given for having an all-female school. Partly it's designed to avoid the distraction of girls worrying about their appearance, when boys are around. Sometimes, its believed, girls underperform, to avoid embarrassing male peers. More significantly, its believed by supporters, that the genders actually learn in fundamentally different manners, with different ways of thinking and communicating. While following the standard Alberta government curriculum, the school goes into greater depth when discussing the role of women in history and other areas of study. According to the school's first principal, Dr. Ursula D. Steele, "Girls need an understanding of the biological and social construction of gender".
