= Lizzie Cyr =

Canadian prostitute charged with vagrancy

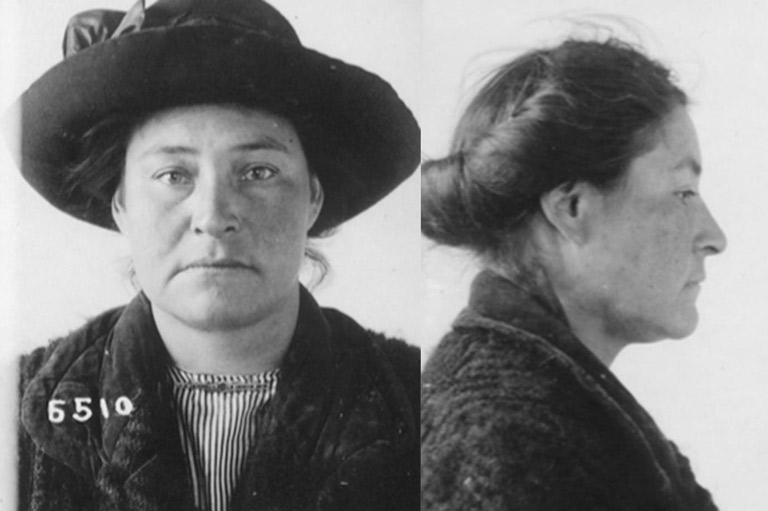
- Born: 1888
- Occupation: Prostitute

Lizzie Cyr was a Canadian woman known for her role in a seminal Canadian court case. Cyr was charged with "vagrancy" by Calgary Police, in 1917. Vagrancy was, at that time, a euphemism for prostitution. The john who reported her claimed she had infected him with gonorrhea.

== Trial ==
Cyr had been charged with vagrancy on previous occasions, but, in 1917, she was defended by John McKinley Cameron, a lawyer with a record of taking pro bono cases, and finding new arguments for their defense. The magistrate hearing her case was Alice Jamieson, one of just two female magistrates in Alberta.

Jamieson, interrupted Cameron's questioning of Cyr's accuser, where he had been pointing out that, as a frequent customer of prostitutes, he couldn't know whether Cyr infected him, or he infected Cyr. Cameron had pointed out that Cyr's accuser was just as much a risk to public health as Cyr. After Jamieson sentenced Cyr before he was finished his defense of her, he challenged Jamieson's status, arguing that, since women were not recognized as "persons" by Canadian law, Jamieson's appointment as a magistrate was invalid.

Jamieson sentenced Cyr to six months hard labour.

Appeals courts in Alberta had upheld Jamieson, but, in 1928, the Supreme Court of Canada confirmed that, under Canadian law, Jamieson was not a "person". Five Canadian activists for human rights, Emily Murphy, Henrietta Edwards, Nellie McClung, Louise McKinney and Irene Parlby had cited the rulings of the Alberta appeals courts in their pursuit to get women's rights recognized. In 1928, Canada was still on its evolution to a fully independent country, and rulings of the Supreme Court were not final. They could be appealed to the United Kingdom's Privy Council. The UK Privy Council did overturn the Supreme Court, confirming women were "persons". This ruling is considered a historic moment in Canadian constitutional history.

== Legacy ==
In October, 2018, Naomi Sayers, an activist for women's rights and indigenous people's rights, referred to Cyr's case in an op-ed on in the Huffington Post, on Canada's murdered and missing first nation's women. Sayers suggested that prejudice against Cyr's Metis heritage played a role in the harshness of Jamieson's sentence. She noted the irony that while the Privy Council's ruling helped white women establish their right to vote, aboriginal women were not able to vote until 1960.
