= CBe-learn =

Location
- 2336 53 Ave SW; Calgary, Alberta, T3E 1L2; Canada; 51.039°N 114.139°W

Information
- Type: Public
- Established: 2001
- School board: Calgary Board of Education
- Principal: Steven Klukas
- Grades: 1 to 12
- Enrollment: 4698 (2009)
- Communities served: All Calgary Communities
- Website: www.cbelearn.ca

CBe-learn is a public elementary, junior high and high school located in Calgary, Alberta, Canada. The school is under the jurisdiction of the Calgary Board of Education. The school is currently located within the Career and Technology Centre.

== History ==
The school was established in 2001 as a virtual learning campus as part of the Calgary Board of Education. Along with the traditional High School program at Ernest Manning High School, CBe-learn moved to the new Ernest Manning Campus in fall 2011. In spring 2013, CBe-learn relocated all administrative and student support services to Lord Shaughnessy High School.

== Online programs ==
CBe-learn offers full Elementary, Jr High and Sr High courses in an online environment, including core academic and complementary courses.

Online courses are offered through Desire2Learn, a comprehensive tool that permits students to interact with course contents, instructors and each other.

Students and teachers interact online through web-based tools, or face-to-face during teacher office hours.

== Homeschooling ==
CBe-learn also offers a homeschooling option for students in grades 1 through 9. This teacher-supported homeschooling program allows families the option of a fully homeschooled option, or a blended environment where certified teachers as well as parents act as the students' teachers.

== Career and Technology Centre ==
CBe-learn is located in the same campus as the Career and Technology Centre, which opened in fall 2010. The Career and Technology Centre provides students the opportunity to access industry-standard equipment and training, in preparation for careers in a variety of technical fields, including engineering and architecture.
