= Career and Technology Centre =

Location
- 2336 – 53rd Avenue S.W. Calgary, Alberta, T3E 1L2; Canada; 51.0064°N 114.1135°W

Information
- Type: Public
- Established: 2011
- School board: Calgary Board of Education
- Principal: Gord Baldwin
- Grades: 10 to 12
- Enrollment: 1127 (2019)
- Communities served: All Calgary Communities
- Website: www.ct-centre.ca

The Career and Technology Centre (CTC) is a centre of excellence, serving high school students in Calgary, Alberta who want to pursue apprenticeship in the trades. The centre falls under the jurisdiction of the Calgary Board of Education. The CTC is currently located within the Lord Shaughnessy High School.

== History ==
The school was established in 2011, and opened with four distinct Career and Technology suites. The remaining suites will be fully operational during the 2012/2013 school year.

The first centre of its kind, the CTC will act as a prototype for other centres on the Calgary Board of Education, and throughout Alberta.

The Career and Technology Centre is affiliated with CBe-learn, the Calgary Board of Education's Online School. The CTC provides students the opportunity to access industry-standard equipment and training, in preparation for careers in a variety of technical fields.
