= Juno Beach Academy of Canadian Studies =

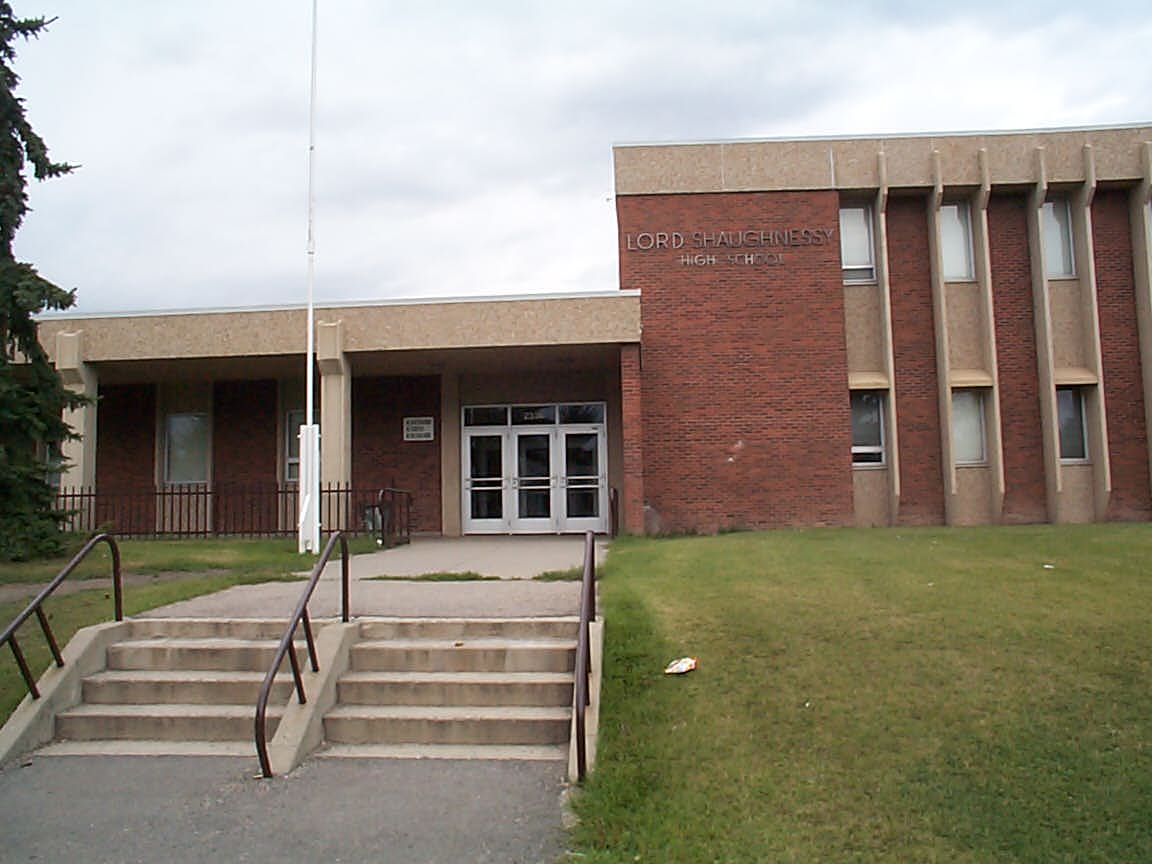

Location
- 316 86 Ave. SE; Calgary, Alberta, T2H 1Z2; Canada; 51.006°N 114.114°W

Information
- School type: Public
- Motto: Educere Excelsior (To Train, to educate, to teach, and to move others forward - To achieve excellence)
- School board: Calgary Board of Education
- Grades: 7-12
- Language: English, French
- Area: Area IV, Ward 11
- Colours: Black and Red
- Website: schools.cbe.ab.ca/b872/

Juno Beach Academy of Canadian Studies was an Alternative Program public high school in Calgary, Alberta. The Calgary Board of Education ran the program as an alternative for students with a focus on humanities (such as police or military careers). Academic achievement was an area of focus (for those most interested in attending college or university after graduation). There was a particular focus on Canadian studies.

== History ==
First housed in Van Horne School from 2003–2006, then later in the old Lord Shaughnessy High School from 2006–2009, it was later housed in the Dr Norman Bethune School from 2009 until its closure in 2017.

The class of 2007, the first to graduate, was given the opportunity to go to Europe. They visited many important landmarks, such as the Palace of Versailles, the Vimy Ridge Memorial, and Juno Beach in Normandy.

The school was closed effective June 30, 2017, after declining enrollment.

== See also ==
- Center West Campus
