= Riley Park =

Urban park in Calgary, Alberta, Canada

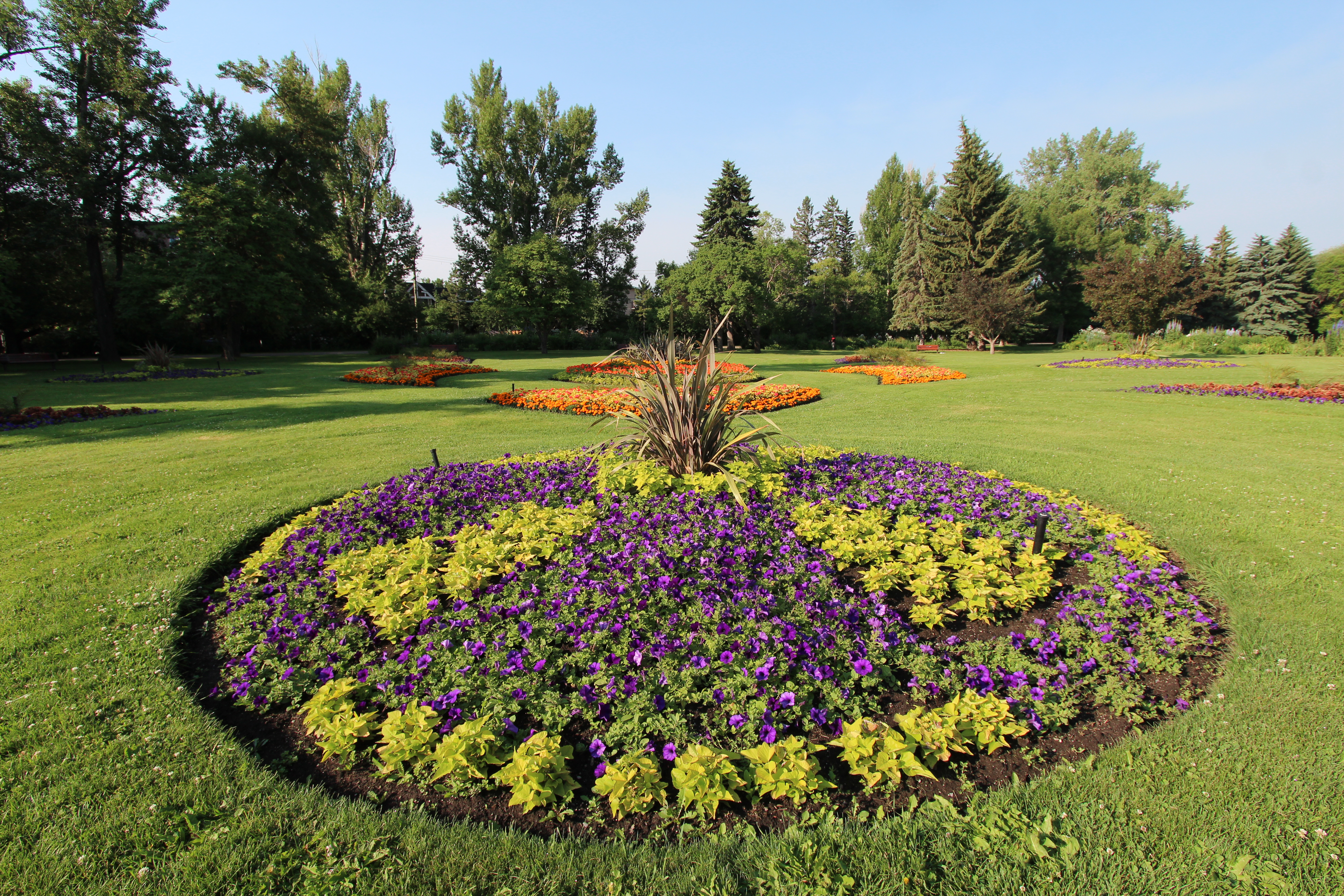
- Flower beds at Riley Park
- Type: Urban park
- Location: Calgary, Alberta, Canada
- Coordinates: 51°03′31″N 114°05′19″W
- Area: 9 ha (0.09 km^{2})
- Operated by: City of Calgary
- Open: All year

Riley Park is an urban park in Calgary, Alberta, Canada. It is located in the neighbourhood of Hillhurst, bounded by 8th Ave. NW, 10th St. NW, 5th Ave. NW and 12th St. NW. The park is host to Calgary's cricket leagues, and the Calgary Concert Band holds free concerts in the park during summer. Amenities include a wading pool and playground.

== History ==
The park was once part of a 146,000 hectare parcel of land known as Cochrane Ranch. The area was homesteaded between 1888 and 1909 by the Riley family, and willed to the City of Calgary following the death of the family's patriarch, Ezra Riley. The 20 acres parcel that is now Riley Park was donated to the city in 1910.

== Sports ==
The park includes two cricket grounds. These grounds are considered the home for the Calgary & District Cricket League, and are considered historically significant for Canadian cricket. The grounds have been used for matches since the early-2000s and have hosted a number of high-profile teams, including Australians, Marylebone Cricket Club, U.S.A., and Yorkshire.

== Location ==
Riley Park is located next to Kensington, Calgary. It is on the north side of the Bow River and south of the Alberta University of the Arts.

== Attractions ==
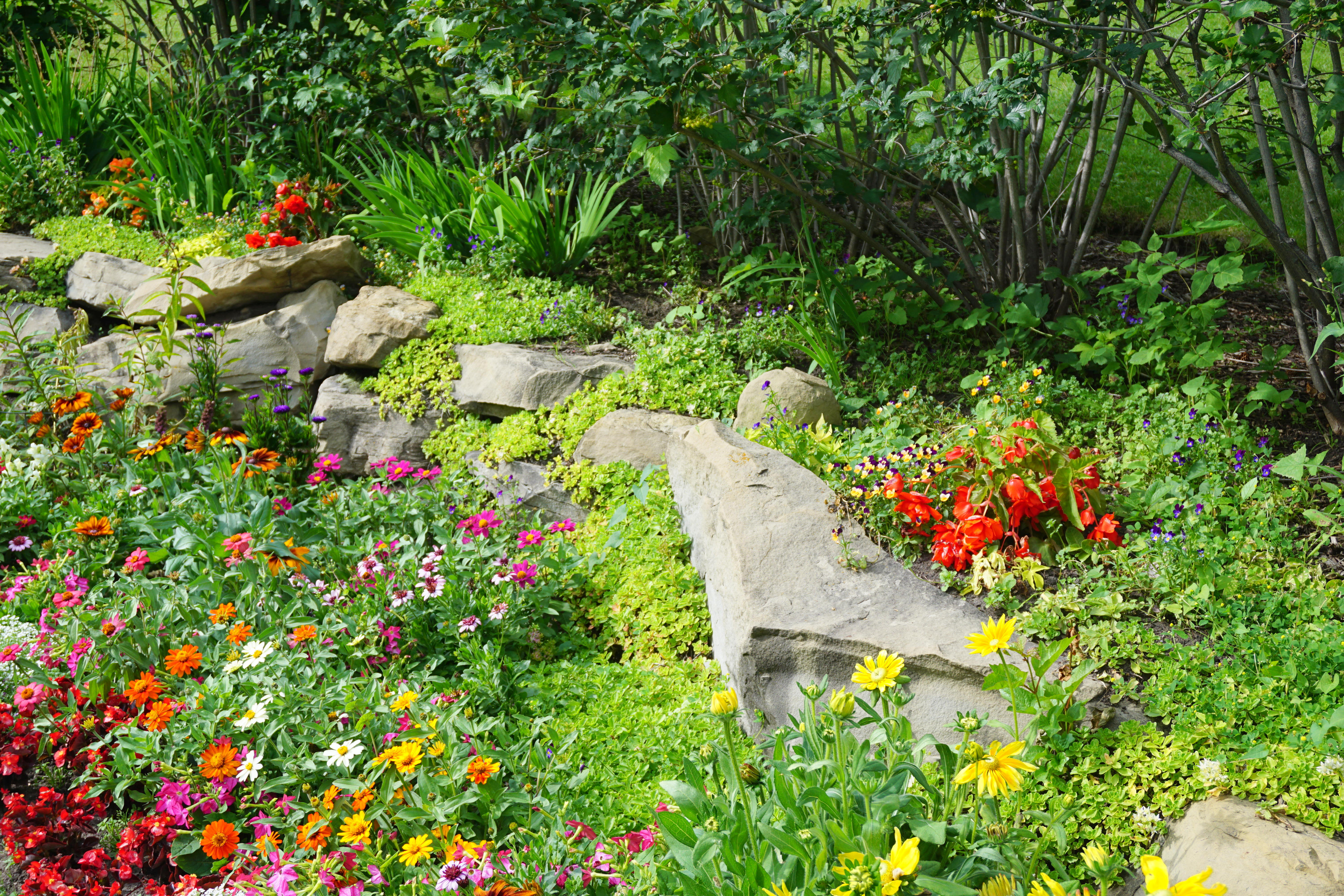
Rock garden

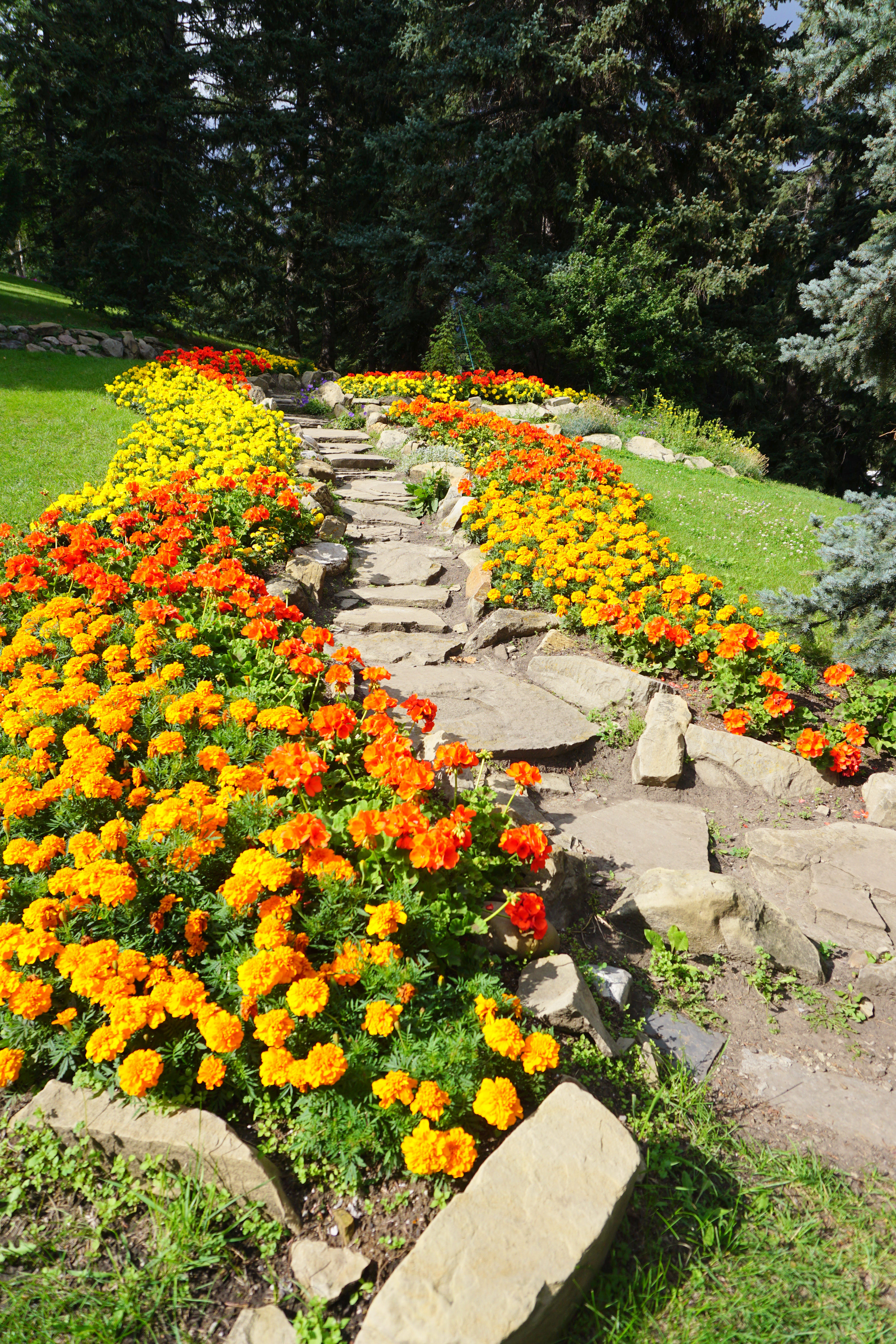
The rock gardens are named after Senator Patrick Burns, a founder of the Calgary Stampede

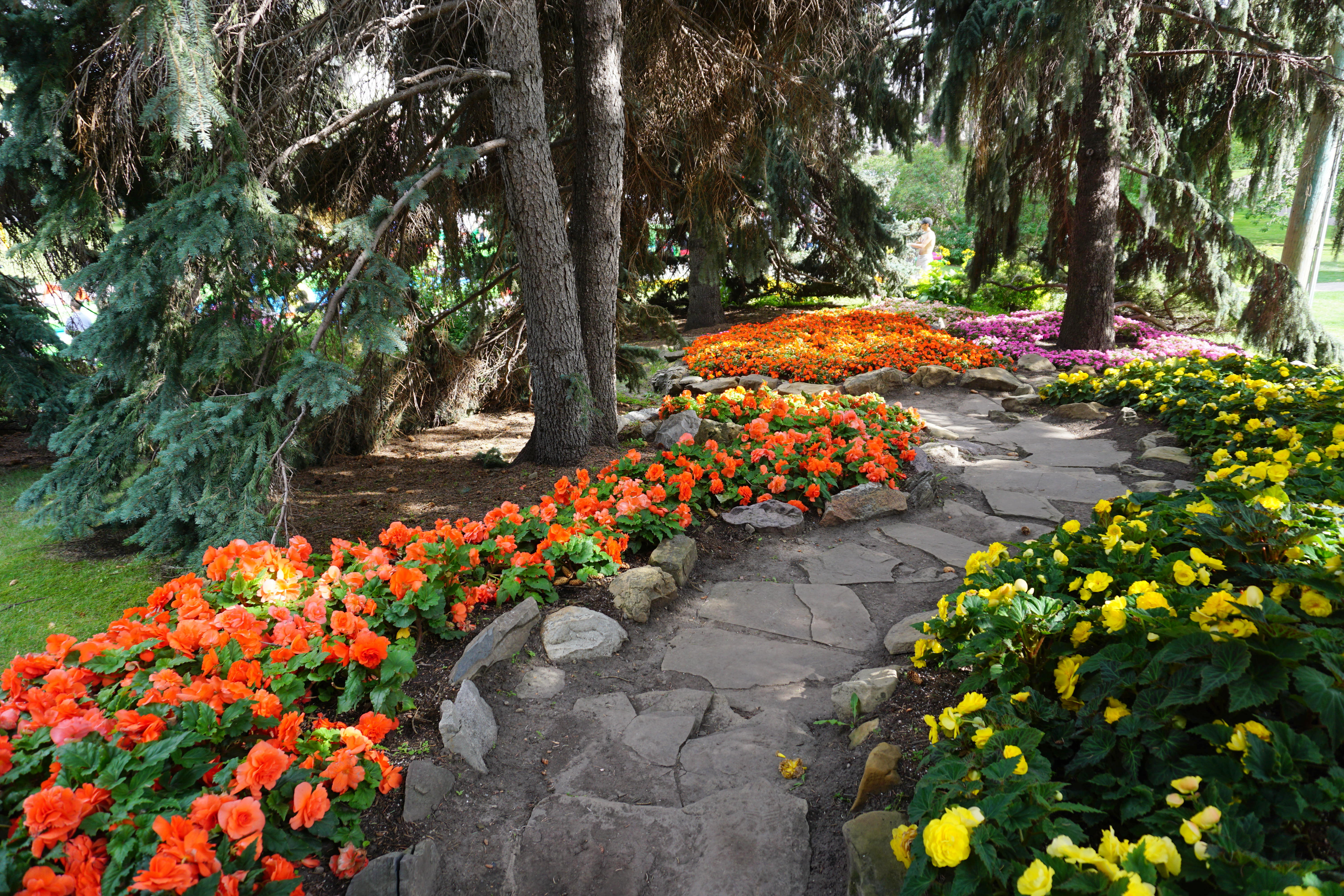
The flagstone is from Burns' mansion.

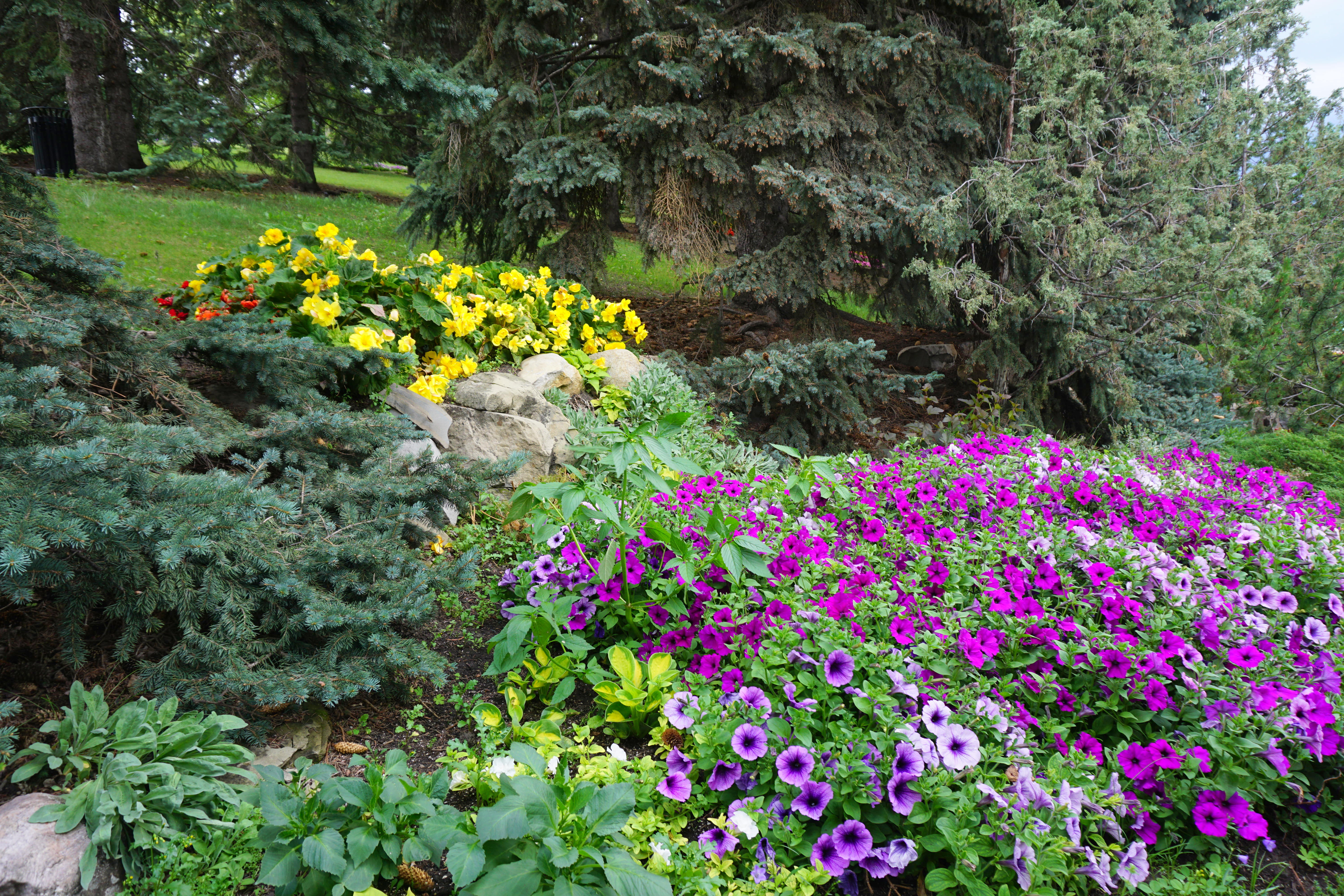
Petunias and hosta under blue spruce and Douglas Fir in Senator Patrick Burns rock garden.

== Features ==
- Cricket pitch
- Senator Patrick Burns Memorial Rock Gardens
- Wading pool
- Gardens near 10th St. entrance
- Picnic sites
- Playground
- Washrooms (seasonal)
- Water fountains (seasonal)
- Concession
