= Rideau Park School (Edmonton) =

Public primary school in Alberta, Canada

Coordinates: 53.4785°N 113.5054°W

Rideau Park School is a public primary school in southwest Edmonton, Alberta. It is a part of Edmonton Public Schools and serves grades Kindergarten through 6. It has a German-English bilingual program. As of 2017 it has 248 students.

== History ==
The school opened in 1977.

== Operations ==
As of 2008 the school places a heavy emphasis on standardized testing as classroom practices may be consistent and so students' results may be compared to those of other schools. The scores on the Alberta Achievement Test are used in determining which changes need to be made to the curriculum. Rideau Park gives an Individualized Program Plan (IPP) to each student who performs below the designated grade level in the Highest Level of Achievement Test (HLT) and not only to special education and special needs students.
