= Hillhurst, Calgary =

Hillhurst
- Neighbourhood
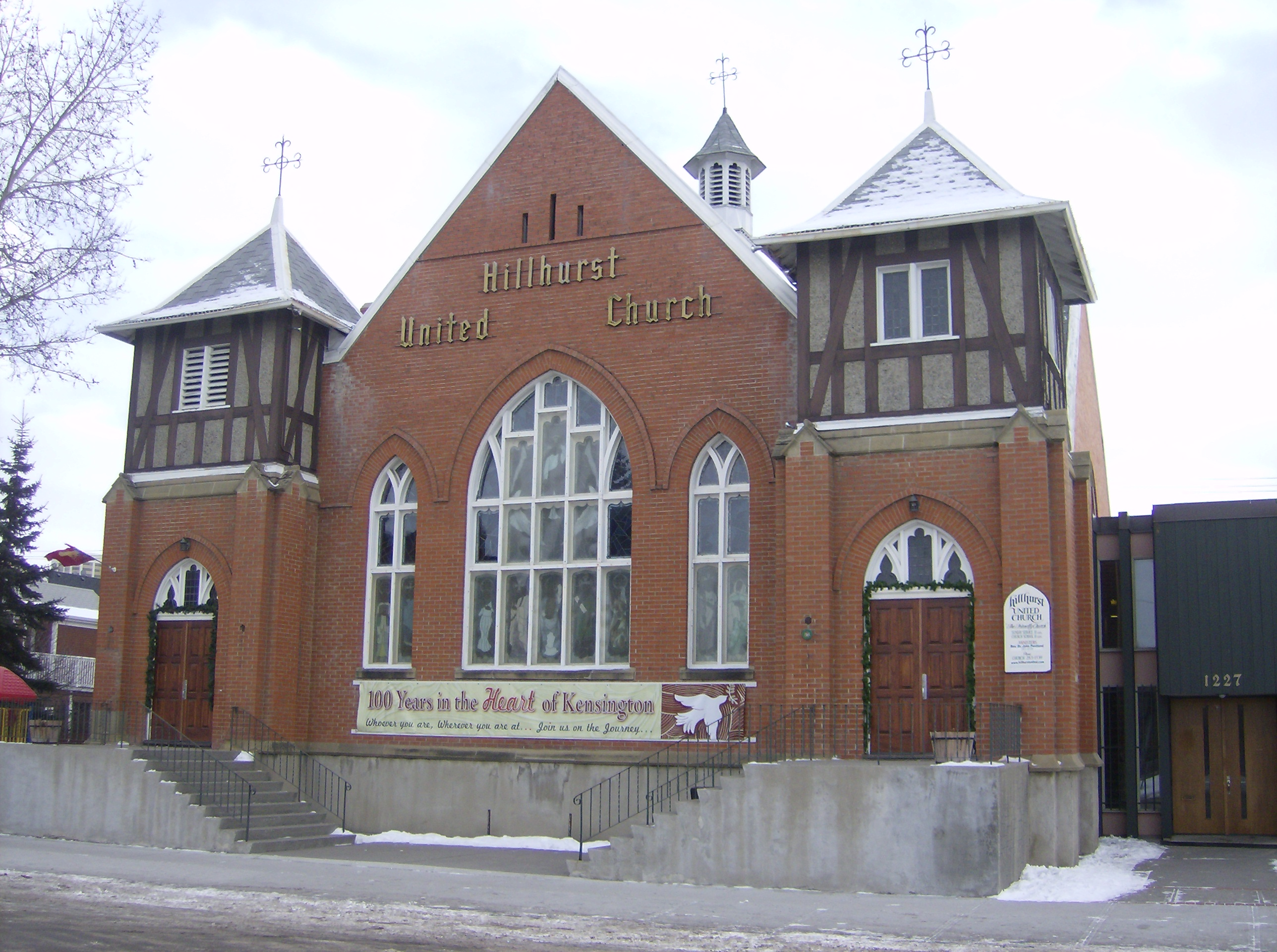
- Hillhurst United Church on Kensington Close

- Location of Hillhurst in Calgary
- Coordinates: 51°03′12″N 114°06′09″W
- Country: Canada
- Province: Alberta
- City: Calgary
- Quadrant: NW
- Ward: 7
- Established: 1914
- Annexed: 1907

Government
  - Mayor: Jeromy Farkas
  - Administrative body: Calgary City Council
  - Councillor: Myke Atkinson (Independent)

Area
  - Total: 0.9 km^{2} (0.35 sq mi)
- Elevation: 1,053 m (3,455 ft)

Population (2006)
  - Total: 5,288
  - Average Income: $50,822
- Website: Hillhurst-Sunnyside Community Association

Hillhurst is a community located within the inner city of Calgary, Alberta, Canada. The boundaries of the community are 8th Avenue NW to the north, 10th Street NW to the east, the Bow River to the south, and 18th Street NW to the west. The communities of Hillhurst and the neighbouring Sunnyside together form the Hillhurst-Sunnyside Community Association. The two communities have an area redevelopment plan in place, revised in 2009.

The Kensington Business Revitalization Zone (BRZ) adjoins the Hillhurst community.

== History ==
Established in 1914, Hillhurst is one of Calgary's oldest neighbourhoods. The first homesteads appeared here in the 1880s – the most notable being that of Felix McHugh. In 1883, he established his homestead in Section 21, now known as Hillhurst. The site of his house is now a playground at corner of 9A Street and Memorial Drive. Ezra Riley acquired the land, and sold it to the city in 1904. He also donated a 20 acre parcel, which is now Riley Park, and a stone structure where St. Barnabas Church is now located.

The city set the size of the lots to 25 feet with lots selling for about $300 each in 1907. In the early days, much of Hillhurst was a slough. As more and more people came, the dirt trails and wooden sidewalks gave way to paved roads; cement side walks, and lit roadways. Now, Hillhurst is a community with a population of approximately 5000.

=== Neighborhood Amalgamation ===
Parts of what is modern day Hillhurst were their own separate neighborhoods, with Upper Hillhurst, Broadview and Westmount being discontinued as communities at an unknown time.

== Demographics ==
In the City of Calgary's 2012 municipal census, Hillhurst had a population of 6,291 living in 3,557 dwellings, a 6.4% increase from its 2011 population of 5,914. With a land area of 2.1 km^{2} (0.81 sq mi), it had a population density of 3,000/km^{2} (7,760/sq mi) in 2012.

Residents in this community had a median household income of $50,822 in 2000, and there were 18.6% low income residents living in the neighbourhood. As of 2000, 15.3% of the residents were immigrants. A proportion of 48.2% of the buildings were condominiums or apartments, and 56.2% of the housing was used for renting.

== Crime ==
Crime Data
Year	Crime Rate (/100 pop.)
2018	5.9
2019	8.5
2020	6.0
2021	5.3
2022	6.3
2023	4.9

== Education ==
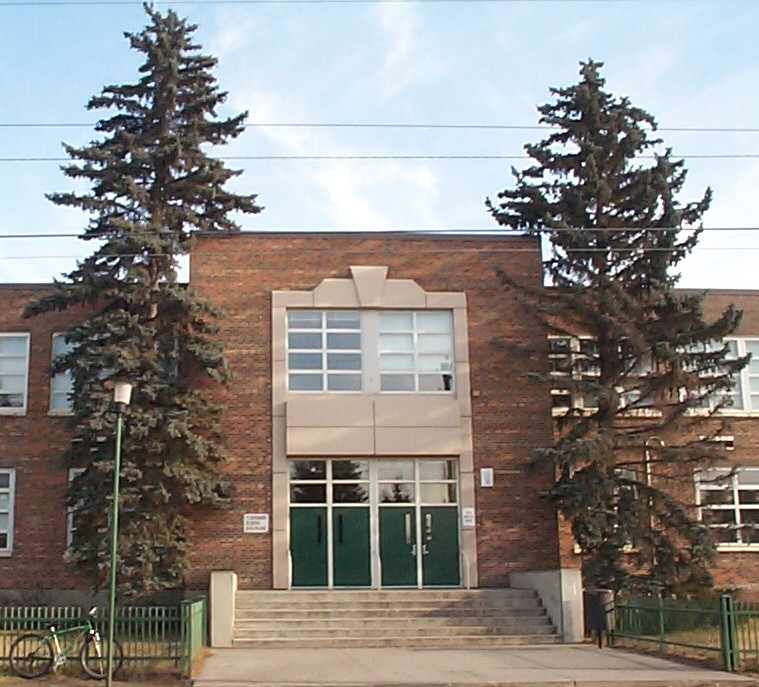
Queen Elizabeth High School

In 2006, there were five schools in the district:

- Hillhurst Community School — Public
- Queen Elizabeth Elementary School — Public
- Queen Elizabeth Junior and Senior High — Public
- St. John Fine Arts Elementary — Calgary Catholic School District (closed in 2010)
- Southern Alberta Institute of Technology, or SAIT Polytechnic — Post Secondary College

== Sports teams ==
Hillhurst is home to the Calgary Kookaburras Australian rules football club.

== See also ==
- List of neighbourhoods in Calgary
