= Louise Dean School =

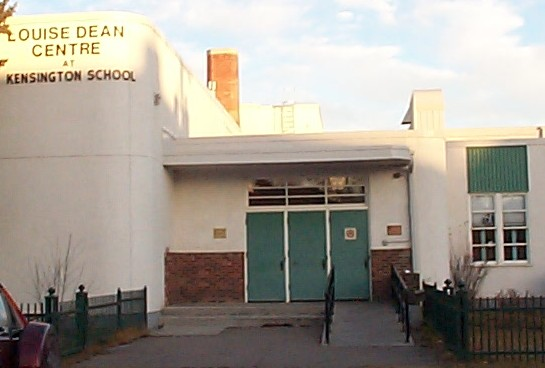

Location
- 120 23 Street NW; Calgary, Alberta, T2N 2P1; Canada; 51.0525°N 114.1154°W

Information
- School type: Public (Canada)
- School board: Calgary Board of Education
- School number: b418
- Principal: Helen Colbourne
- Grades: 9–12
- Enrollment: 109 (2019)
- Area: Area II, Ward 7
- Website: school.cbe.ab.ca/school/louisedean

Louise Dean School was a public combined junior and senior high school in Calgary, Alberta, Canada, that teaches Grades 9 through 12. It is designed exclusively for teenage mothers, both current and expectant. It is operated by the Calgary Board of Education (CBE) with assistance from The Catholic Family Service of Calgary; despite the organization's name, the program is secular.

The school was named for Louise Dean, who was an elected trustee of the CBE born in 1896.

Louise Dean School will be relocating to Jack James High School for Sept 2023

== Special programs ==
The Catholic Family Service assists students with counseling, and organizes support groups for the teen mothers, fathers (although only the mothers can be students), and grandparents of the babies. It provides an on-site daycare, the Dr. Clara Christie Infant Learning Centre, which allows the mothers to attend classes, but still visit their children frequently. The staff also helps teach new mothers parenting and life skills.

The Calgary Health Region assists students and their babies in areas of nursing, childbirth education and dental hygiene.
