= Reuben Rupert Jamieson =

Canadian politician (1856–1911)

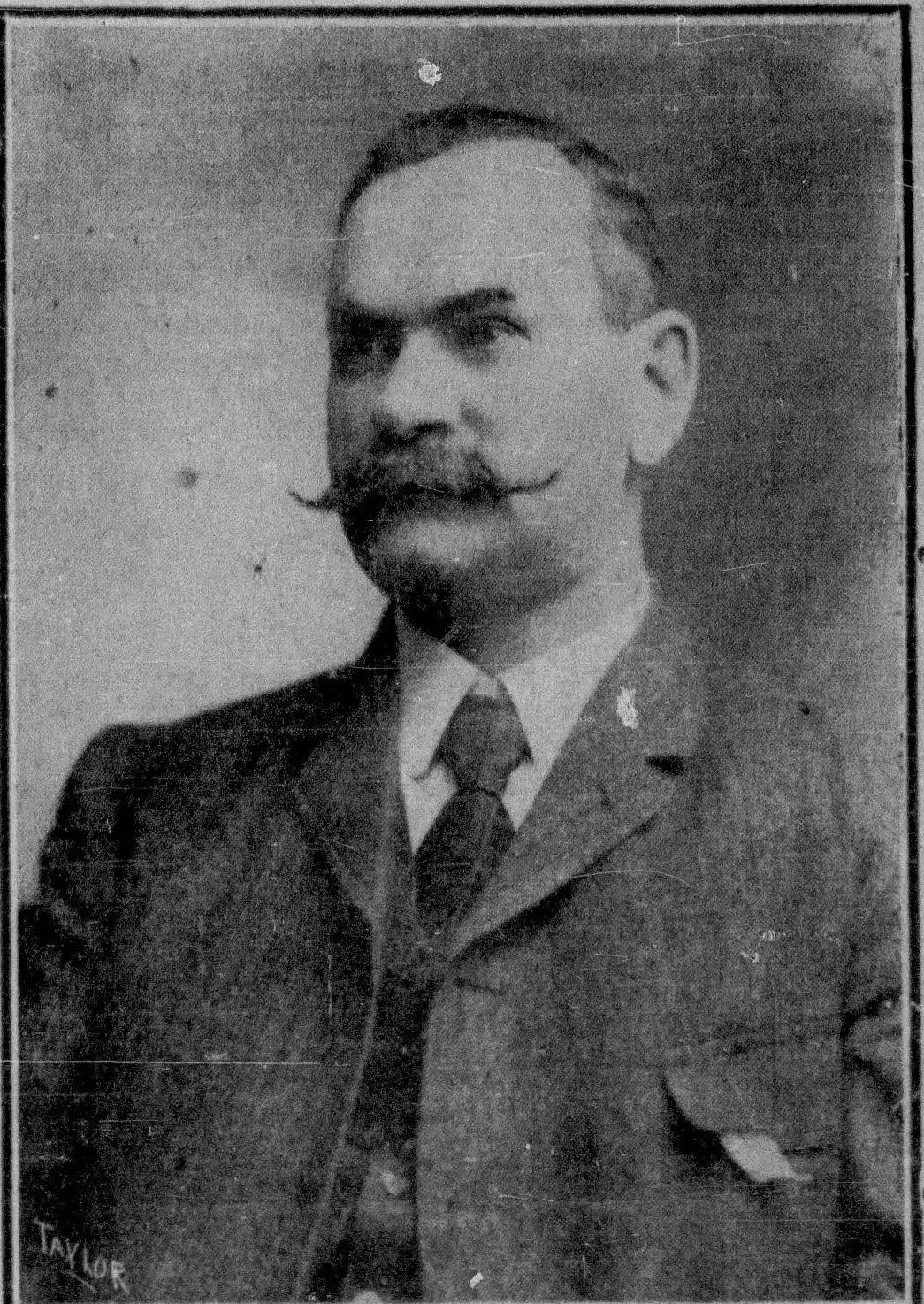
- Jamieson in 1908

16th Mayor of Calgary
- In office January 2, 1909 – January 2, 1911
- Preceded by: Arthur Leslie Cameron
- Succeeded by: John William Mitchell

Personal details
- Born: December 12, 1856 Westover, Canada West
- Died: May 30, 1911 (aged 54) Vancouver, British Columbia
- Spouse: Alice Jamieson
- Occupation: Railroad executive

Reuben Rupert Jamieson (December 12, 1856 – May 30, 1911), also known as Reuben Roper Jamieson, was a Canadian politician who served as the 16th mayor of Calgary, Alberta.

== Biography ==
Jamieson was born on December 12, 1856, in Westover, Canada West, and educated in Hamilton, Ontario. Between 1873 and 1902, he worked for various railways. This included the Canadian Pacific Railway, which brought him to Calgary in 1903 as the area general superintendent of the Central Division (Fort William, Ontario, to Broadview, Saskatchewan).

In 1908, Jamieson retired from the CPR and entered civic politics. He served as Calgary's mayor from January 2, 1909, to January 2, 1911. During his tenure, the city completed the first phase of the Street Railway and he also served as the Vice President of the United Alberta Municipalities.

Along with his wife, Reuben Jamieson was a Christian Scientist, and a long-time member of First Church of Christ, Scientist, Calgary.

Jamieson died on May 30, 1911, aged 54, in Vancouver. It was reported this although his death was sudden, he had suffered a nervous breakdown. His wife, Alice Jamieson, was appointed in 1914 as the first female juvenile court judge in the British Empire and later became magistrate of the women's court. She was also active in the fight for women's suffrage.

Preceded by Arthur Leslie Cameron	Mayor of Calgary; 1909–1911	Succeeded by John William Mitchell
