= Herbert Arthur Sinnott =

Canadian politician

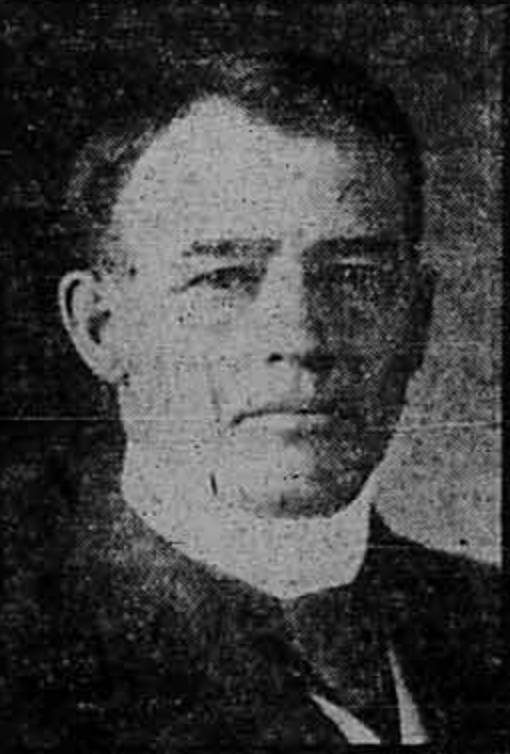
- Sinnott pictured in The Calgary Daily Herald, June 15, 1918

18th Mayor of Calgary
- In office January 2, 1913 – January 2, 1915
- Preceded by: John William Mitchell
- Succeeded by: Michael Copps Costello

Personal details
- Born: January 7, 1871 Kings County, New Brunswick, Canada
- Spouse: Margaret Horne (m. 1901; died 1906)
- Children: Margaret B. Sinnott (1906–1988)
- Education: Mount Allison University (BA, 1895)
- Occupation: educator, barrister, politician

Herbert Arthur Sinnott (January 7, 1871 – after 1923) was a Canadian educator, lawyer and municipal politician who served as the 18th mayor of Calgary, Alberta from 1913 to 1915.

Sinnott was born in Kings County, New Brunswick on January 7, 1871 to David S., a farmer, and Frances (née Taylor) Sinnott. After attending schools in Sussex, New Brunswick, Sinnott graduated from Mount Allison University with a Bachelor of Arts and started his teaching career in Gagetown as principal of a grammar school. He later taught high school in Moncton, New Brunswick before moving west to Alberta in 1900. In 1903, he became a high school principal in Calgary, the first ever to the city. He began a career in law in 1908, articling under Thomas M. Tweedie. In 1911, he was called to the bar. Around this time, Sinnott also owned and rented out various properties in the city of Calgary as well as Lethbridge. He also served on the Calgary School Board as trustee in 1912 and 1920–22 along with chairman from 1908–11 and 1918–19.

Sinnott was elected as Mayor of Calgary and served in this position from January 2, 1913 to January 2, 1915. During his time in office, oil was discovered within the city of Calgary, and it was said that the "[whole city] quickly became oil conscious".

In January 1923, Sinnott pleaded guilty in a court to "misappropriating clients' trust funds" during his work as a lawyer in Calgary. During his trial, Sinnott admitted his guilt and was sentenced to seven years to be served in a Prince Albert, Saskatchewan jail. The magistrate had expressed that "the more grievous" crime that of the betrayal of trust of Sinnott to his clients, and that it was unfortunate that such a citizen of high of esteem, had admitted to committing the crimes. The magistrate also expressed that the punishment was decided to set a precedent and to "deter others from doing the same thing", along with restating that though it was hard to see "a citizen of Mr. Sinnott's calibre" take the sentence, it was a necessary justice. It is not known where Sinnott went after presumably leaving prison, although there have been rumours that he may have moved to Australia shortly thereafter. While the Calgary Herald reported Sinnott as living in Eastern Canada in December 1937.

He married Margaret Horne, a graduate nurse and daughter of a sea captain, in 1901 and had one child with her, Margaret. His wife died in 1906. A conservative in politics, during his time in Calgary, Sinnott was a member of the Ancient Order of Foresters in Calgary as well as the Methodist church. Sinnott was widely regarded for his work in the educational field, with a 1912 biography beginning with "The educational annals of the Northwest present few names which shine with a brighter luster of good deeds done than the one which forms [this paragraph]".

== Bibliography ==
- Leslie, Jean (1975). "Herbert A. Sinnott, Mayor 1913–1914". Past and Present: People, Places and Events in Calgary. Calgary, Alberta: Century Calgary Publications.
- MacRae, Archibald Oswald (1912). History of the province of Alberta, Volume 2. Calgary, Alberta: Western Canada History Co.
