= Calgary Board of Education =

Public school board in Alberta, Canada

Calgary Board of Education Calgary School District No. 19

Location
- 1221 – 8 Street S.W. Calgary, Alberta, Canada Canada
- Coordinates: 51°2′52″N 114°3′30″W

District information
- Superintendent: Joanne Pitman
- Chair of the board: Laura Hack
- Schools: 251 (2024-25)
- Budget: CA$1.67 billion (2025-26)

Students and staff
- Students: 204,556(2024-25)
- Staff: ~ 7,000 (2024-25)

Other information
- Vice Chair of the board: Jenny Regal
- Elected trustees: Jenny Regal, wards 1, 2 Laura Hack, wards 3, 4 Cynthia Cordova, wards 5, 10; Patricia Bolger, wards 6, 7 Susan Vukadinovic, wards 8, 9 Nancy Close, wards 11, 13; Charlene May, wards 12, 14
- Website: www.cbe.ab.ca

Calgary School District No. 19 or the Calgary Board of Education (CBE) is the public school board in Calgary, Alberta, Canada. As a public system, the CBE is required to accept any students who meet age and residency requirements, regardless of religion. Calgary Board of Education (CBE) was founded in 1885 as the Calgary Protestant Public School District No. 19.

== Size ==
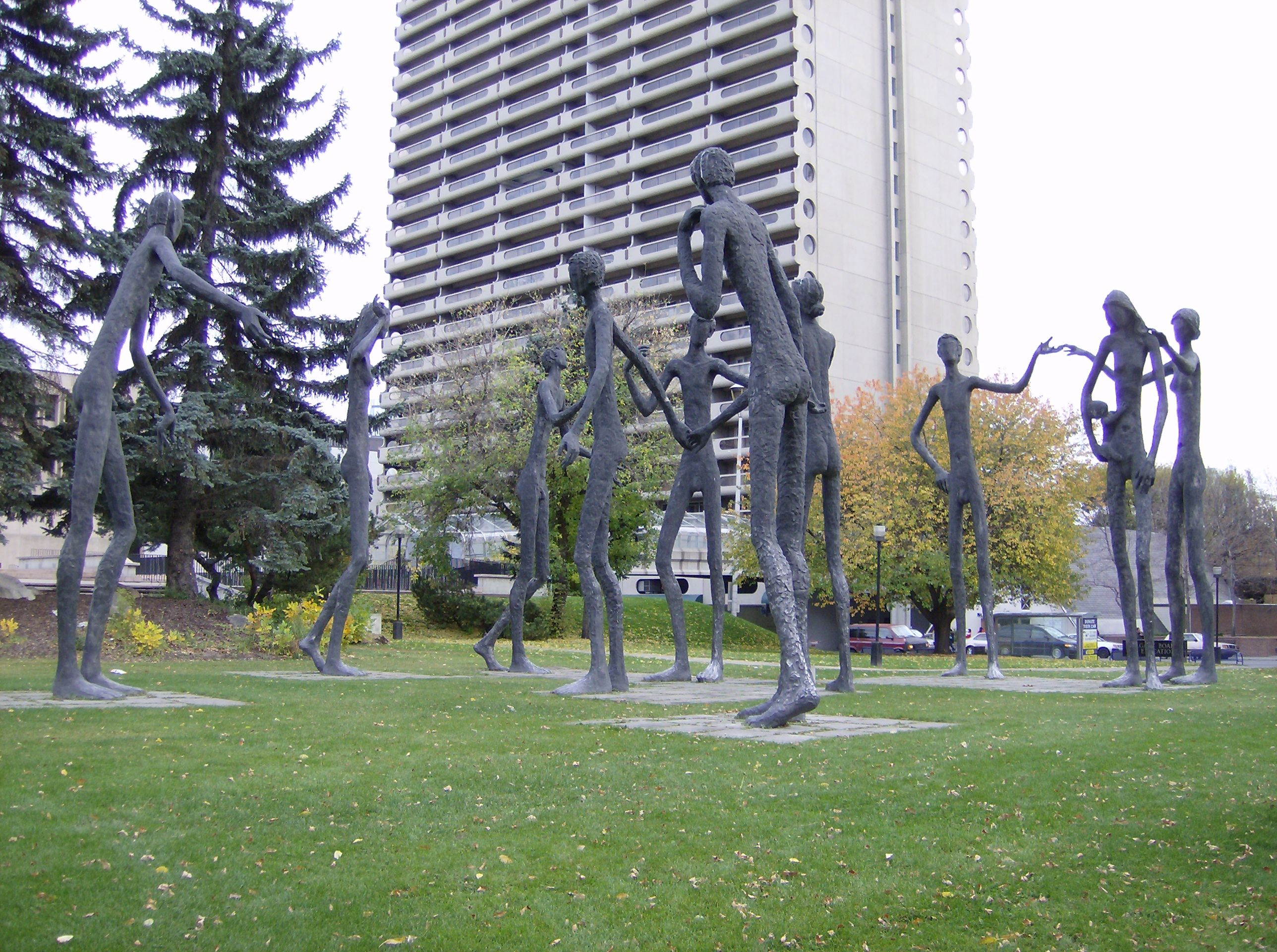
Statues by Mario Armengol outside the CBE's former headquarters

The CBE is the largest school board in Alberta, and over twice the size of the other major school district board in Calgary, the Calgary Catholic School District (CCSD), which teaches mainly Catholic students. The other two districts based in the city, both Francophone, are a fraction of the size of the CBE with only a handful of schools each. In land area, the CBE is the smallest of the four Calgary districts, as its territory is limited to the municipal limits of Calgary (although its area is only slightly smaller than that of the CCSD). As the city limits have expanded, the CBE boundary has remained in sync. All CBE land overlaps the other three districts.

The CBE operates 251 schools in grades K-12. Total student enrolment is around 142,000 students. For context, that is larger than the entire population of Red Deer, Alberta. The operating budget is $1.67 billion for the 2025/26 school year, which has increased by $7 million from the 2024/25 school year.

== Governance ==
A group of seven elected trustees govern the CBE. Each trustee represents two wards in the city. They are elected every four years, in the regular municipal election. In the election, Calgary voters can only vote for a trustee to one (not both) of the two main school boards. The last election was in October 2025. Trustee Laura Hack was elected Chair of the Board of Trustees by her fellow Trustees in October 2025 at an organizational meeting to confirm committee appointments for the following year. The public (CBE) and Catholic (CCSD) systems operate independently of each other, and are both under the direct authority of the provincial government of Alberta.

=== Board history ===
Taxing powers were stripped from boards by the Government of Alberta back in the 1990s.

The CBE Board of Trustees was dismissed by the Government of Alberta in 1999, when Danielle Smith was the Chair of the Board of Trustees. It was dismissed after being deemed dysfunctional by the province. An election was held in 1999 to replace the Board.

Long-serving Trustee and Chair of the Board, Pat Cochrane declined to run in the 2013 municipal elections. Cochrane was first elected in 1999 and has devoted much effort and time to the causes of Public Education. Fellow trustee George Lane was defeated by a wide margin in Wards 6 & 7.

For several election cycles, among the many candidates running on a platform of strengthening the CBE, there have also been candidates running on a platform of taking down the CBE and weakening the public education system to increase government funding for private options (which include private schools and charter schools). Some of these candidates have run as individuals and some have run as part of a slate of candidates. In the 2017 election, two members of the Students Count slate were elected and one, Lisa Davis, resigned before her term was ended and co-founded a charter school shortly after that duplicates existing CBE offerings. In the 2021 election, the take-down-the-CBE slate was called "Take Back the CBE". None of the candidates running on a platform of weakening the CBE were elected in the 2021 election.

There are a total of ten schools that do not belong to the CBE but instead belong to a building management company called Honeywell. These schools are restricted in what can be done for certain aspects such as placing holes in the wall in order to install soap/paper dispensers as well as needing different NFC-Style key passes for entry.

As of 2025, eleven new schools are in the design stage, four are planned for development, and two are planned for modernization.

== Special programs ==
The CBE operates a number of special programs, usually, but not always operated out of regular schools (with regular instruction).

The CBE operates an adult and continuing education program through Chinook Learning Services. It offers High School Upgrading, Continuing Education and adult English as a Second Language (ESL) programs.

The Louise Dean Centre is a school specifically designed for female students who become pregnant before completing high school. It provides daycare for the children, flexible schedules for the students, and special counselling. In 2022 it was slated for closure with consideration to move the program to Jack James High School.

The CBE's Gifted and Talented Education (GATE) program assists qualified students with more advanced instruction. GATE compacts and accelerates the typical curriculum. It also provides extra experts and mentors. Currently, nine CBE schools offer the GATE program.

In 2003, the CBE opened the board's only all-female school, Alice Jamieson Girls' Academy. In the same year, over the board's objections, the Calgary Girls' School (CGS) public charter school was also opened; but as a charter school, CGS is run independently of the CBE. Both schools teach grades 4-9, and are founded on the premise that girls learn differently from boys, and will under-perform for social reasons when in the presence of male peers.

In 2011, the CBE opened the board's first all-male alternative program, based in the Sir James Lougheed School. The program teaches grades K-5, and similar to the all-girls schools - the program is founded on the premise that boys learn differently from girls, and they may behave differently in order to meet "macho" expectations, and that they require a more active, hands-on teaching style.

=== French as the primary language of instruction ===
The board also operates a French immersion program in a limited number of schools. The program is geared mainly toward English-speaking families who wish their children to become fully fluent in French. It offers early and late immersion programs.

Up until 2000, the CBE also provided French instruction (as the primary language of instruction) to children from French families (who didn't need or want immersion). When the Greater Southern Francophone School Board was formed in 2000, the CBE relinquished its authority over such schools and handed over (what was then known as) Ecole Queen's Park (its only such school at the time) to the Francophone board.

== Schools ==
=== Senior high schools ===
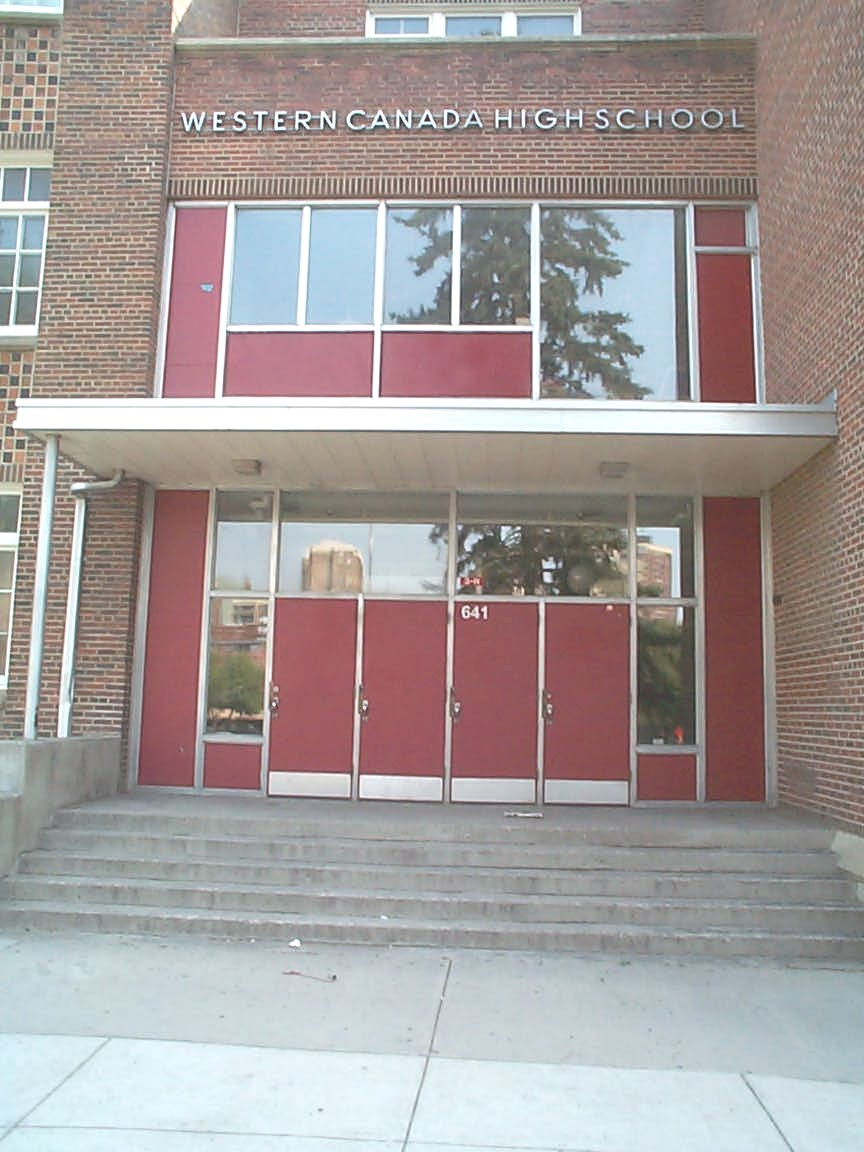
Western Canada High School is the oldest and largest school operated by the CBE

In Alberta, a senior high school teaches grades 10-12. However, some may not teach all three grades. Also, some are combined with junior high schools, which teach grades 7-9. The following is a list of senior high schools operated by the CBE as of 2024, taken from the CBE's complete list. The board divides the city into seven areas.

School name	Grades	Area	Location
Alternative High School (at Clinton Ford Centre)	10-12	6	5003 - 20 St. S.W.
Bowness High School	10-12	1	4627 - 77 St., N.W.
Centennial High School	10-12	5	55 Sun Valley Blvd., S.E.
Central Memorial High School	10-12	6	5111 - 21 St., S.W.
Crescent Heights High School	10-12	3	1019 - 1 St., N.W.
Dr. E.P. Scarlett High School	10-12	6	220 Canterbury Dr., S.W.
Ernest Manning High School	10-12	7	20 Springborough Blvd., S.W.
Forest Lawn High School	10-12	3	1304 - 44 St., S.E.
Henry Wise Wood High School	10-12	6	910 - 75 Avenue, S.W.
Jack James High School	10-12	3	5105 - 8 Avenue, S.E.
James Fowler High School	10-12	2	4004 - 4 St., N.W.
Joanne Cardinal-Schubert High School	10-12	5	19480 45 St., S.E.
John G. Diefenbaker High School	10-12	2	6620 - 4 St., N.W.
Lester B. Pearson High School	10-12	4	3020 - 52 St. N.E.
Lord Beaverbrook High School	10-12	5	9019 Fairmount Dr., S.E.
Nelson Mandela High School	10-12	4	45 Saddletowne Circle N.E.
North Trail High School	10-12	3	12500 Harvest Hills Blvd N.E.
Robert Thirsk High School	10-12	1	8777 Nose Hill Dr., N.W.
Sir Winston Churchill High School	10-12	1	5220 Northland Dr., N.W.
Western Canada High School	10-12	7	641 - 17 Avenue, S.W.
William Aberhart High School	10-12	2	3009 Morley Trail, N.W.
Combined Junior and Senior High Schools
School name	Grades	Area	Location
Juno Beach Academy of Canadian Studies (at Dr. Norman Bethune School)			
Louise Dean Centre	7-12	II	120 - 23 St. N.W.
Queen Elizabeth Junior/Senior High School	7-12	7	512 - 18 St., N.W.
Online School
School name	Grades	Area	Location
CBe-learn (at Lord Shaughnessy High School)	1-12	All	2336 53 Avenue, S.W.
Career and Technology Centres
School name	Grades	Area	Location
Career and Technology Centre (at Lord Shaughnessy High School)	7-12	All	2336 53 Avenue, S.W.

The CBE, in 2010, launched the CBE Chief Superintendent's Student Advisory Council - a group of high school students with student representation from each of the CBE's high school programs. They meet regularly with the CBE's Chief Superintendent, Christopher Usih, to discuss issues in the system and propose solutions.

== See also ==
- List of Alberta school boards
- List of high schools in Alberta
