= John William Mitchell =

Canadian politician

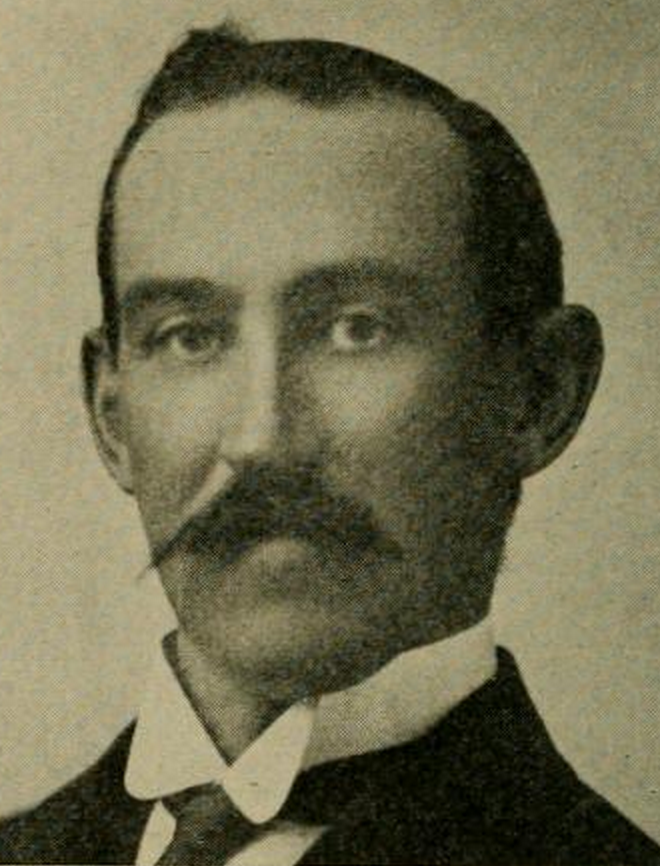

17th Mayor of Calgary
- In office January 2, 1911 – January 2, 1913
- Preceded by: Reuben Rupert Jamieson
- Succeeded by: Herbert Arthur Sinnott

Alderman for The City of Calgary
- In office January 2, 1905 – January 2, 1911
- In office January 2, 1915 – November 22, 1915

Personal details
- Born: April 19, 1872 Cambridgeshire, England
- Died: December 15, 1952 (aged 80) Vancouver, British Columbia
- Occupation: Businessman

John William Mitchell (April 19, 1872 – December 15, 1952) was the 17th mayor of Calgary, Alberta.

== Early life ==
Born in Cambridgeshire, England in 1872, Mitchell arrived in Calgary in 1891. He had a job with a dry goods business then later with the lumber firm of W. Stuart and Company. Mitchell married Kathleen Lang in June 1913.

== Political career ==
In 1905, Mitchell was elected to Calgary City Council as an Alderman representing the original Ward 3, and was subsequently re-elected for four more terms. As an alderman, Mitchell spent time as Chairman of both the Fire and Finance Committees.

Mitchell was elected mayor in the December 1910 Calgary Municipal election and held office from January 2, 1911 to January 2, 1913. In June 1911, the construction of Calgary City Hall was completed and it was opened by Mitchell, along with leader of the opposition Robert Borden. As mayor, Mitchell hosted the Governor General of Canada Prince Arthur, Duke of Connaught and Strathearn, and Princess Patricia. Mitchell was also the president of the Alberta Urban Municipalities Association in 1911-1912.

During his time as Mayor, Mitchell led the city in staking a mineral claim on oil and gas resources in an attempt to provide a new source of revenue. He supervised a dig on June 12, 1911 which successfully located natural gas, but the city was late in submitting the claim and instead homesteader Michael Stoos filed the claim, which became the famed Dingman Discovery Well in May 1914.

Mitchell again became Alderman in 1915, however he resigned on November 22, 1915 to enlist as a member of the 82nd Battalion of the Canadian Expeditionary Force for active overseas service during the First World War.

== Later life ==
Mitchell was a member of the Central Methodist Church. As a longtime member of the Independent Order of Odd Fellows, he was elected Grand Master of the Grand Lodge of Alberta. Mitchell died in 1952 in Vancouver, British Columbia at the age of 80.

| Preceded by Reuben Rupert Jamieson | Mayor of Calgary; 1911–1913 | Succeeded by Herbert Arthur Sinnott |
