= 1890 Calgary municipal election =

Election in Alberta, Canada

- January 6, 1890
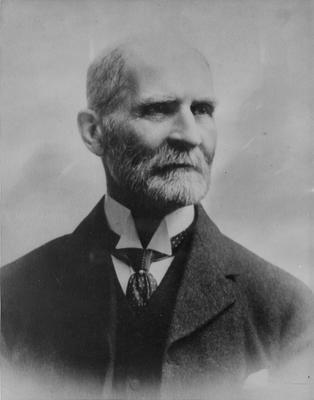

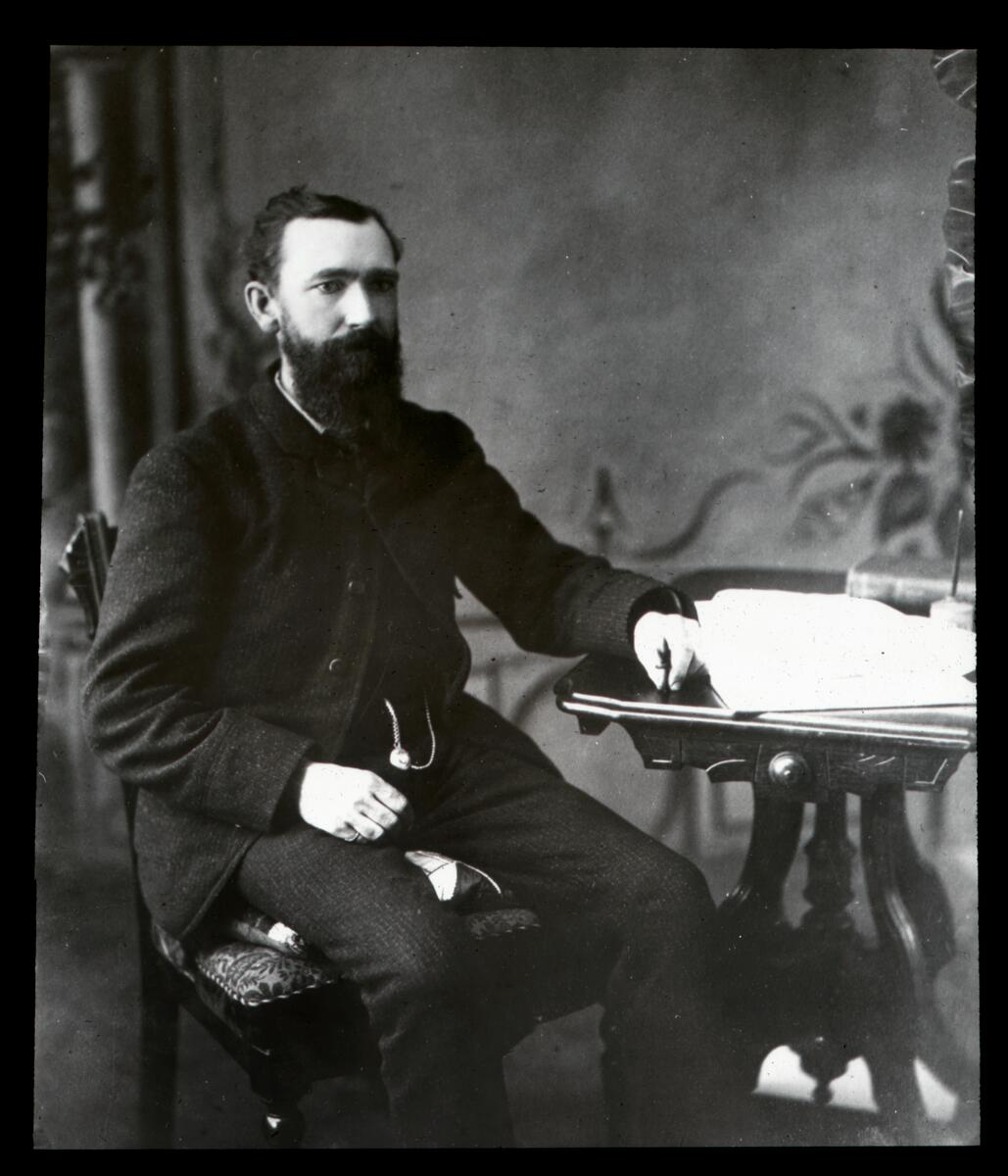
Candidate	James Delamere Lafferty	George Murdoch
Popular vote	130	110
Percentage	54.17%	45.83%
Mayor before election
Daniel Webster Marsh
Elected mayor
James Delamere Lafferty

The 1890 Calgary municipal election was scheduled for January 6, 1890 to elect a Mayor and six Councillors to sit on the sixth Calgary Town Council from January 20, 1890 to January 19, 1891.

== Background ==
Voting rights were provided to any male, single woman, or widowed British subject over twenty-one years of age who are assessed on the last revised assessment roll with a minimum property value of $200.

The election was held under multiple non-transferable vote where each elector was able to cast a ballot for the mayor and up to four ballots for separate councillors.

The Calgary Daily Herald reported there were many cases of electors who were entitled to vote, but were not on the voters list.

== Results ==
=== Mayor ===
1890 Calgary municipal election: Mayor
Party	Candidate	Votes	%	Elected
-	James Delamere Lafferty	130	54.17%	✓
-	George Murdoch	110	45.83%	
Total valid votes		240	-	

=== Councillors ===
1890 Calgary municipal election: Councillor
Party	Candidate	Votes	%	Elected
-	Alexander McBride	154	64.17%	✓
-	James Reilly	151	62.92%	✓
-	Wesley Fletcher Orr	143	59.59%	✓
-	Joseph Maw	125	52.08%	✓
-	Howard Douglas	105	43.75%	✓
-	William Henry Cushing	102	42.50%	✓
-	Bannerman	96	40.00%	
-	Silas Alexander Ramsay	90	37.50%	
-	McLelland	88	36.67%	
-	Ede	71	29.58%	
-	Frederick George Topp	70	29.17%	
-	A. Parrish	18	7.50%	
-	Ferguson	7	2.92%	
Source(s) Election was held under multiple non-transferable vote where each elector was able to cast a ballot for the mayor and up to six ballots for separate councillors. Full name of unsuccessful candidates is not known.

== See also ==
- List of Calgary municipal elections

== Sources ==
- Frederick Hunter: THE MAYORS AND COUNCILS OF THE CORPORATION OF CALGARY Archived March 3, 2020
