= 1888 Calgary municipal election =

Election in Alberta, Canada

- January 3, 1888
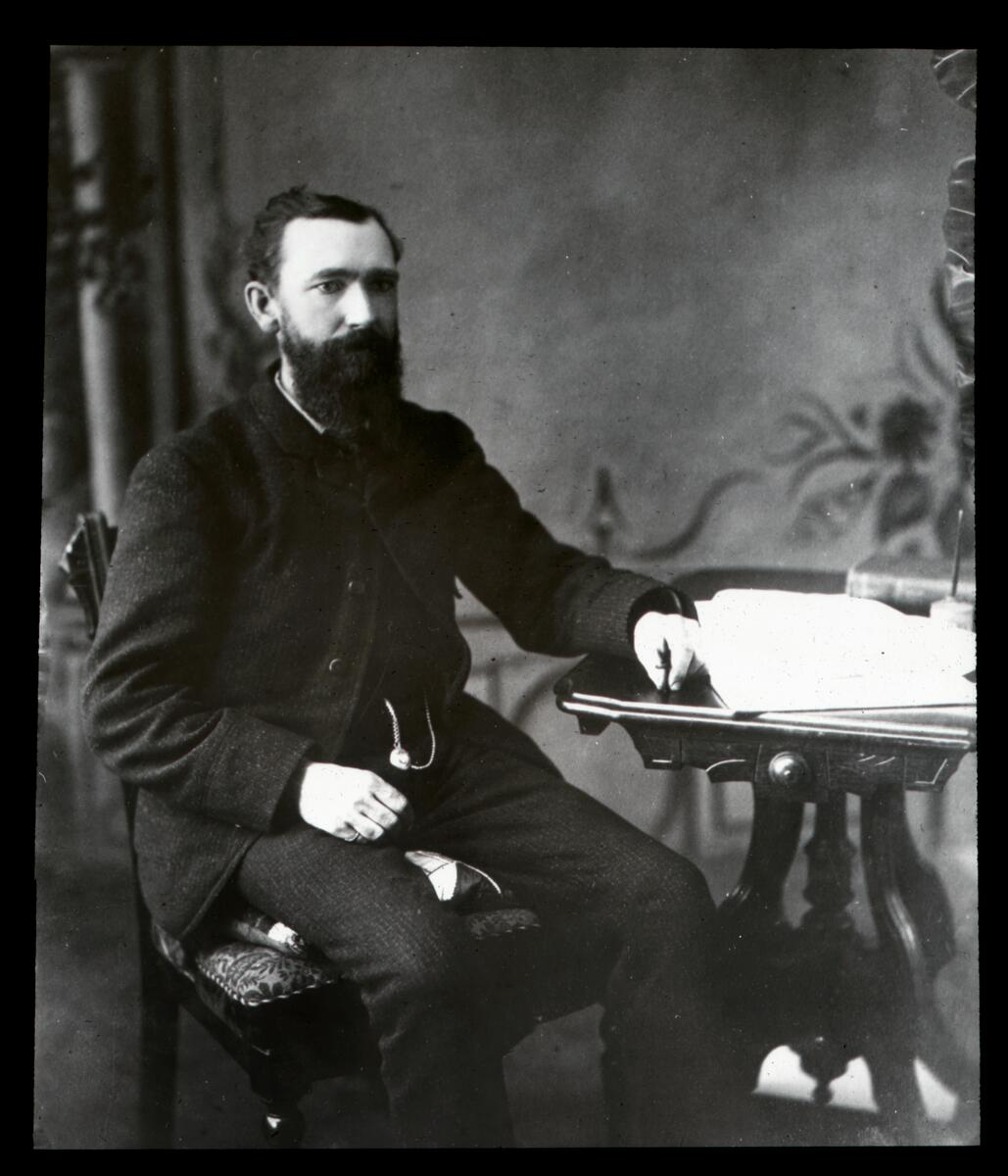

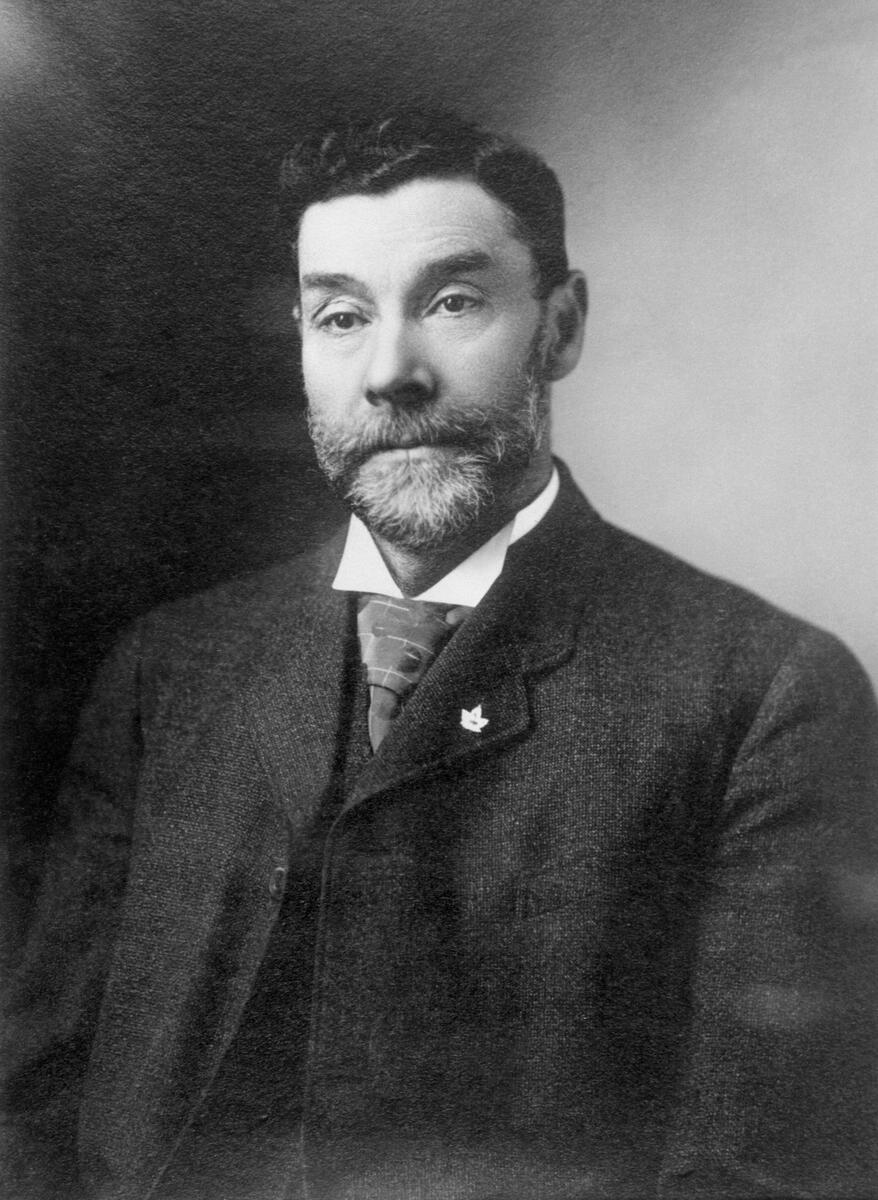
	A.E.S.
Candidate	Arthur Edwin Shelton	George Murdoch	George Clift King
Popular vote	85	73	74
Percentage	36.64%	31.47%	31.90%
Mayor before election
George Clift King
Elected mayor
Arthur Edwin Shelton

The 1888 Calgary municipal election was held on January 3, 1888 to elect a Mayor and six Councillors to sit on the fourth Calgary Town Council from January 16, 1888 to January 21, 1889.

The 1888 election was the first after the Town Council had expanded from four councillors to six councillors.

== Background ==
Nominations for council opened on December 27, 1887 and E. P. Davis was named returning officer, and the town fire hall was selected as his headquarters. Former Mayors George Murdoch, George Clift King and Arthur Edwin Shelton were nominated for the position of mayor. A public meeting was called a 2 p.m. later in the day to give speeches, which became so pointed and personal that several of the Aldermanic candidates withdrew their nominations.

== Results ==
=== Mayor ===
Candidate	Votes	Percent
Arthur Edwin Shelton	85	36.64%
George Clift King	74	31.90%
George Murdoch	73	31.47%

=== Councillors ===
Six councillors were elected in this election. Election was conducted using Plurality block voting. Each voter could cast up to six votes.

Candidate	Votes	Percent
Elected		
James Campbell Linton	133	
Howard Douglas	122	
John Gillies McCallum	120	
Wesley Fletcher Orr	110	
Henry Collins	109	
Alexander Allan	109	
Not elected		
Isaac Sanford Freeze	101	
James Reilly	84	
Joseph Bannerman	81	
M. O'Keefe	74	
James Martin	74	
Joseph Maw	57	
James Delamere Lafferty	25	
G.T. Duncan	24	
T. Kdu	22	
Charles Watson	17	

== See also ==
- List of Calgary municipal elections

== Sources ==
- "Calgary Elections". Calgary Tribune. January 4, 1888. p. 4.
