= Calgary Fire of 1886 =

1886 fire in Calgary, Alberta

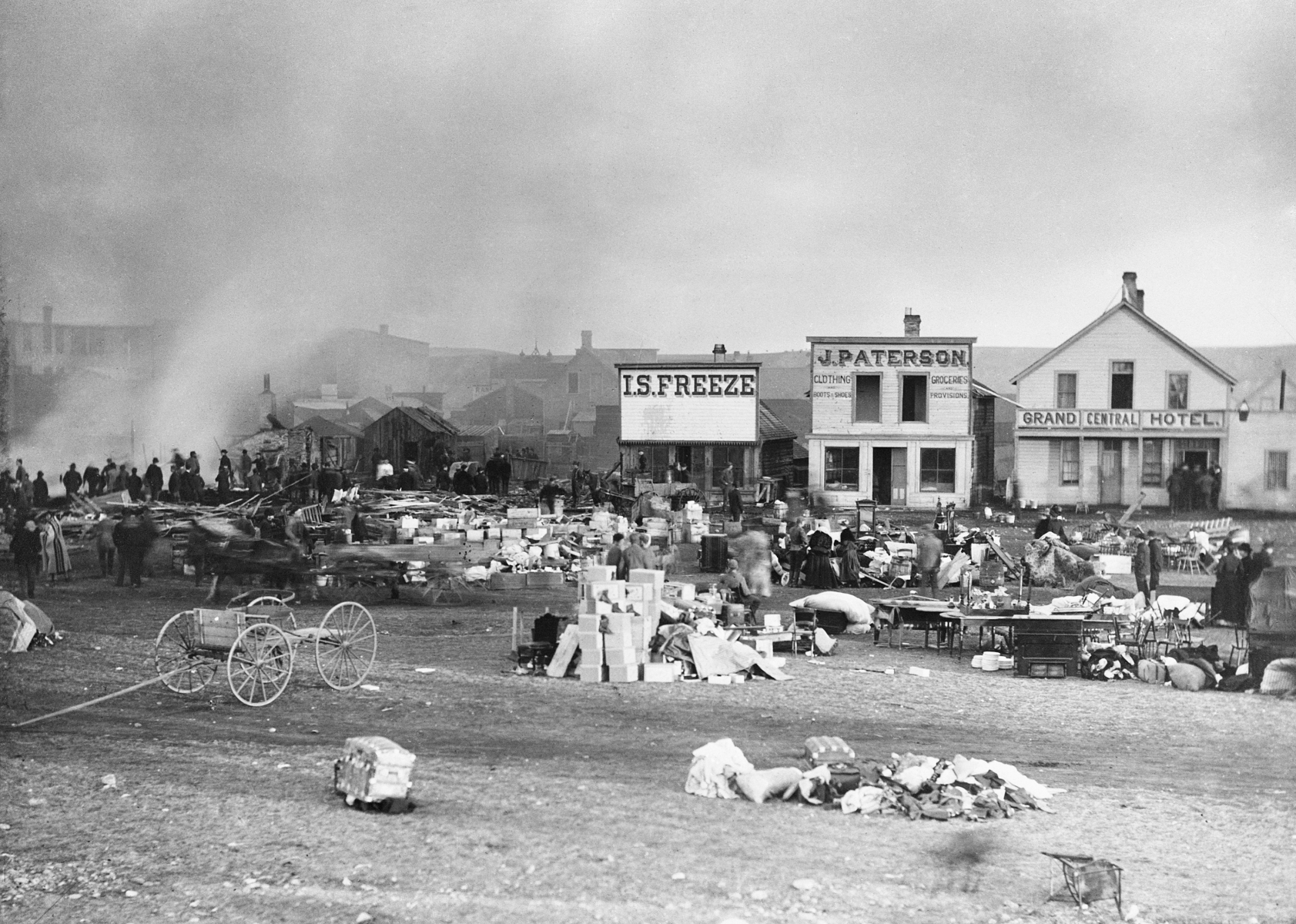
- Aftermath of the fire between Centre Street and 1st Street SE.
- Date: November 7, 1886
- Location: Calgary, District of Alberta, North-West Territories, Canada (now Alberta)
- Coordinates: 51.0445567°N 114.0642273°W

Impacts
- Deaths: 0
- Injuries: 0
- Structures destroyed: 18
- Cost: $103,200 (estimate)

The Calgary Fire of 1886, also known as the Great Calgary Fire of 1886, was a conflagration that burned in the Canadian city of Calgary on Sunday, November 7, 1886. The fire began at the rear wall of the local flour and feed store, and spread through the community's wooden structures leading to the destruction of 18 buildings.

The fire resulted in changes in local construction practices to stop the likelihood and rapid spread of future fires including an increased reliance on sandstone for new structures, which resulted in the town's early nickname "Sandstone City".

== Background ==
The Town of Calgary was officially incorporated exactly two years earlier on November 7, 1884, under Northwest Territories Ordinance. The municipal government was in disorder following the events of the January 1886 Calgary municipal election which saw incumbent Mayor George Murdoch decisively win the election which was overturned by Stipendiary Magistrate Jeremiah Travis for elector list fraud and appointed James Reilly as mayor and replaced two other members of council. Neither faction was capable of governing the town, which led to the newly ordered chemical engine for the recently organized Calgary Fire Department (Calgary Hook, Ladder and Bucket Corps) to be held in the Canadian Pacific Railway's storage yard due to lack of payment.

Local government would be restored a few days before the fire in the November 3, 1886, municipal election which saw George Clift King elected mayor.

== Fire and aftermath ==
In the early morning of November 7, 1886, flames were reported at the rear wall of the Parish and Son flour and feed store. The Calgary Hook, Ladder and Bucket Corps was sent to battle the fire, and broke into the Canadian Pacific Railway's freight shed to retrieve the impounded chemical engine.

The Corps determined it was necessary to form a firebreak to prevent further damage, and former mayor George Murdoch agreed and participated in the demolition of his harness shop. An attempt was made to use gunpowder to blow up Murdoch's store, however the Calgary Weekly Herald noted that this "failed owing to the force of the charge not being sufficiently concentrated". The fire was stopped then extinguished after the break was created. This would be the second time George Murdoch would lose a business to fire, the first occurring in 1871 during Great Chicago Fire.

Ultimately, fourteen buildings were destroyed or razed in attempts to control the blaze, including four stores, three warehouses, three hotels, a tinsmith shop and a saloon. Losses were estimated at $103,200; however no one was killed or injured. Authorities suggested arson may have been involved, but no arrests were made.

To reduce the potential for future fires, city officials drafted a bylaw requiring all large downtown buildings were to be built with sandstone, which was readily available nearby in the form of Paskapoo sandstone. Following the fire several quarries were opened around the city by prominent local businessmen including Thomas Edworthy, Wesley Fletcher Orr, J. G. McCallum, and William Oliver. Buildings built with sandstone following the fire included the Knox Presbyterian Church (1887), Imperial Bank Building (1887), Calgary City Hall (1911), and Calgary Courthouse No. 2 (1914).

== List of buildings destroyed ==
- Athletic Hotel
- Mountain View Hotel
- Mortinier's Bake Shop
- Sherman House
- Misenv Manufacturing Co.
- Dunn & Lineham Warehouse
- I. G. Baker & Co.
- Union Hotel
- Hunter Store and Dwelling
- Ellis Store and Building
- S. Parish & Co.
- J. Hodway Building

== See also ==
- History of firefighting
- List of fires in Canada
- List of disasters in Canada
