= 1884 Calgary municipal election =

Election in Alberta, Canada

- December 3, 1884
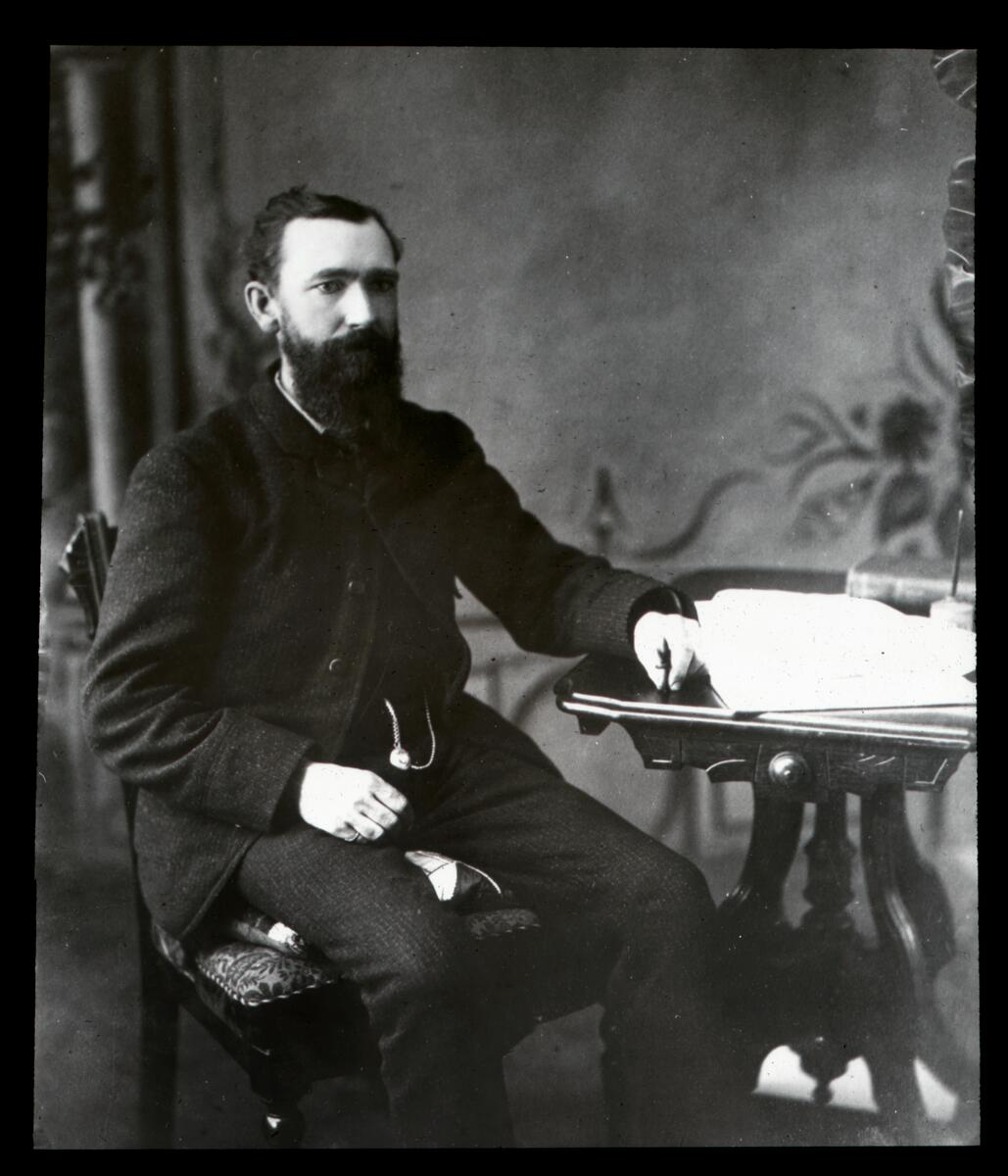
		E. R.
Candidate	George Murdoch	E. Redpath
Popular vote	202	16
Percentage	92.66%	7.34%
Mayor before election
None
Elected mayor
George Murdoch

The 1884 Calgary municipal election was held on December 3, 1884 to elect a Mayor and four Councillors to sit on the first Calgary Town Council from December 4, 1884 to January 18, 1886 (Or possibly April 3, 1886, or possibly October 21, 1886).

== Background ==
Even before gaining town status, Calgary had a form of municipal organization under the name Citizen's Committee.

Elected by a vote held on January 14, 1884, the Citizens Committee lobbied for town status, a Territorial member for Calgary and increased assistance from the North-West Territorial government to cover the cost of a bridge, all achieved that same year. In the vote, 24 Calgary men put their names up for election, which was perhaps 10 percent of the adult male population of Calgary at the time. Major James Walker took the most votes (88) and was declared chairman of the Committee. Dr. Henderson, G.C. King, Thomas Swan, George Murdoch, G.D. Moulton and Captain Stewart were the most popular after Walker and were also declared elected. (Voting was by Plurality block voting).

Calgary was officially incorporated as the Town of Calgary by proclamation issued on November 7, 1884, under provisions of the newly passed North-West Territories Council Municipal Ordinance of 1884.

Only days after the incorporation was announced, a "mass meeting" was held in Calgary where those assembled demanded federal representation and to bring federal government attention on certain other matters that affected the lives of local residents.

The right to vote in town elections was provided to any male British subject over twenty-one years of age who are assessed on the last revised assessment roll with a minimum property value of $300.

The 1884 election was held under First-past-the-post voting for mayor and Plurality block voting to elect four councillors, where each elector was able to cast up to four votes.

=== Length of Council Term ===
The first municipal council for the Town of Calgary was intended to sit from December 4, 1884 to January 18, 1886, however judicial interference by stipendiary magistrate Jeremiah Travis in the January 1886 election resulted in Territorial Ordinance 1-1886 "An Ordinance Respecting Municipal Matters in the Town of Calgary" voiding the results of the January 1886 election and declaring no council or mayor for the Town of Calgary exists.

The City of Calgary recognizes George Murdoch as Mayor of the Town of Calgary from December 4, 1884 to October 21, 1886, which implies the City either recognizes Murdoch as the winner of the January 1886 election, or recognizes Murdoch remained Mayor until the November 1886 election.

== Results ==
- The results of the elections, as reported in the December 3, 1884 edition of The Calgary Herald, were as follows:

=== Mayor ===
Candidate	Votes	Percent
George Murdoch	202	92.66%
E. Redpath	16	7.34%
Total	218	–

=== Councillors ===
Election conducted using Plurality block voting. Each voter could cast up to four votes. Perhaps 221 cast a ballot in the aldermanic contest. (Percentage indicated is percentage of voters who endorsed the candidate, not percentage of votes.)

1884 Calgary municipal election: Councillor
Party	Candidate	Votes	%	Elected
-	Simon Jackson Hogg	183	83.94%	✓
-	Neville James Lindsay	179	82.11%	✓
-	Joseph Henry Millward	170	77.98%	✓
-	Simon John Clarke	147	67.46%	✓
-	Issac Sanford Freeze	103	47.25%	
-	Archibald Grant	52	23.85%	
-	J. Jarrett	56	11.93%	
-	Total	884		
Source(s) Election was held under Multiple non-transferable vote where each elector was able to cast a ballot for the mayor and up to four ballots for separate councillors.

== 1885 Council By-election ==
Simon Jackson Hogg would resign from council effective May 20, 1885. A by-election was scheduled for June 17, 1885. Following the cut-off for nominations, Isaac Sanford Freeze was acclaimed and installed June 10, 1885.

== See also ==
- List of Calgary municipal elections

== Sources ==
- Frederick Hunter: THE MAYORS AND COUNCILS OF THE CORPORATION OF CALGARY Archived March 3, 2020
