= 1889 Calgary municipal election =

Election in Alberta, Canada

- January 7, 1889
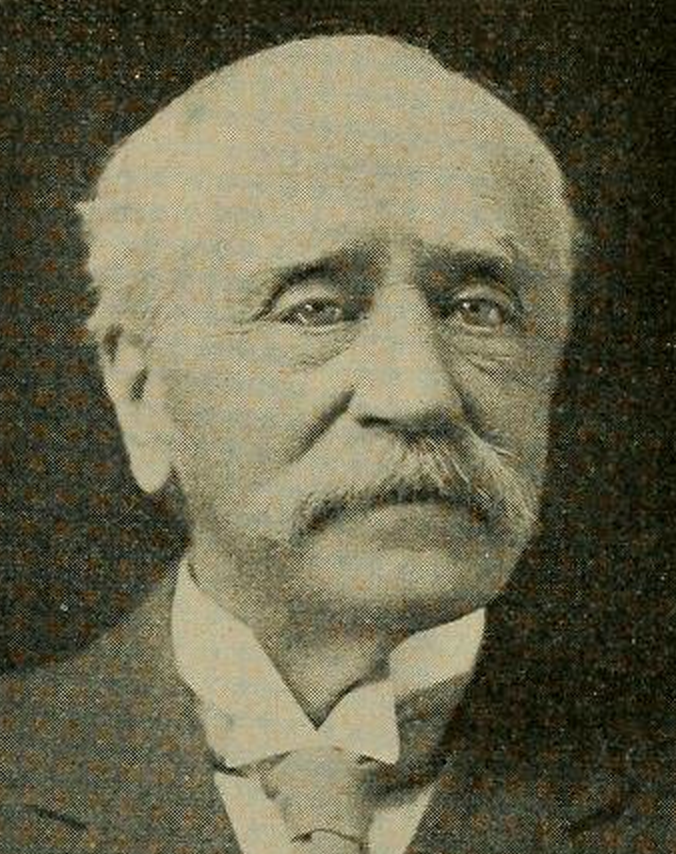
Candidate	Daniel Webster Marsh
Popular vote	Acclaimed
Mayor before election
Arthur Edwin Shelton
Elected mayor
Daniel Webster Marsh

The 1889 Calgary municipal election was scheduled for January 7, 1889 to elect a Mayor and six Councillors to sit on the fifth Calgary Town Council from January 21, 1889 to January 20, 1890.

Acclamation were declared in all seats upon close of nominations on December 31, 1888 so no election was held. The Calgary Weekly Herald praised the acclamation as evidence the town has reached a point where "citizens can bring themselves to forget past differences and rise superior to those bitter factional prejudices which have prevailed in the past" Prior to nominations for the election a group of local businessmen proposed a slate of candidates at a public meeting, and spread word that the candidates should not be challenged.

== Results ==
=== Mayor ===
- Daniel Webster Marsh

=== Councillors ===
- James Bannerman
- James Gerald Fitzgerald
- Archibald Grant
- George Clift King
- George Murdoch
- Wesley Fletcher Orr

== See also ==
- List of Calgary municipal elections

== Sources ==
- Frederick Hunter: THE MAYORS AND COUNCILS OF THE CORPORATION OF CALGARY Archived March 3, 2020
