= 1891 Calgary municipal election =

Election in Alberta, Canada

- January 5, 1891
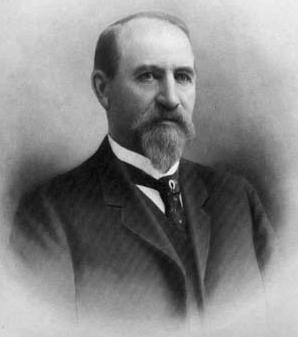

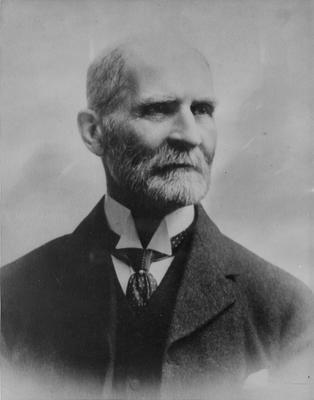
Candidate	James Reilly	James Delamere Lafferty
Popular vote	198	183
Percentage	51.97%	48.03%
Mayor before election
James Delamere Lafferty
Elected mayor
James Reilly

The 1891 Calgary municipal election was scheduled for January 5, 1891 to elect a Mayor and six Councillors to sit on the seventh Calgary Town Council from January 5, 1891, to January 18, 1892.

== Background ==
Voting rights were provided to any male, single woman, or widowed British subject over twenty-one years of age who are assessed on the last revised assessment roll with a minimum property value of $200.

The election was held under multiple non-transferable vote where each elector was able to cast a ballot for the mayor and up to four ballots for separate councillors.

== Results ==
=== Mayor ===
1891 Calgary municipal election: Mayor
Party	Candidate	Votes	%	Elected
-	James Reilly	198	51.97%	✓
-	James Delamere Lafferty	183	48.03%	
Total valid votes		381	-	

=== Councillors ===
1891 Calgary municipal election: Councillor
Party	Candidate	Votes	%	Elected
-	George Clift King	252	66.14%	✓
-	James Bannerman	235	61.68%	✓
-	Alexander Lucas	233	61.15%	✓
-	William Henry Cushing	228	59.84%	✓
-	Howard Douglas	181	47.51%	✓
-	Frederick George Topp	175	45.93%	✓
-	Joseph Maw	144	37.80%	
-	Alexander McBride	133	34.91%	
-	Silas Alexander Ramsay	117	30.71%	
-	John William Costello	112	29.40%	
-	A. Parrish	95	24.93%	
Source(s) Election was held under Multiple non-transferable vote where each elector was able to cast a ballot for the mayor and up to six ballots for separate councillors. Full name of unsuccessful candidates is not known.

== See also ==
- List of Calgary municipal elections

== Sources ==
- Frederick Hunter: THE MAYORS AND COUNCILS OF THE CORPORATION OF CALGARY Archived March 3, 2020
