= November 1886 Calgary municipal election =

Election in Alberta, Canada

- November 3, 1886
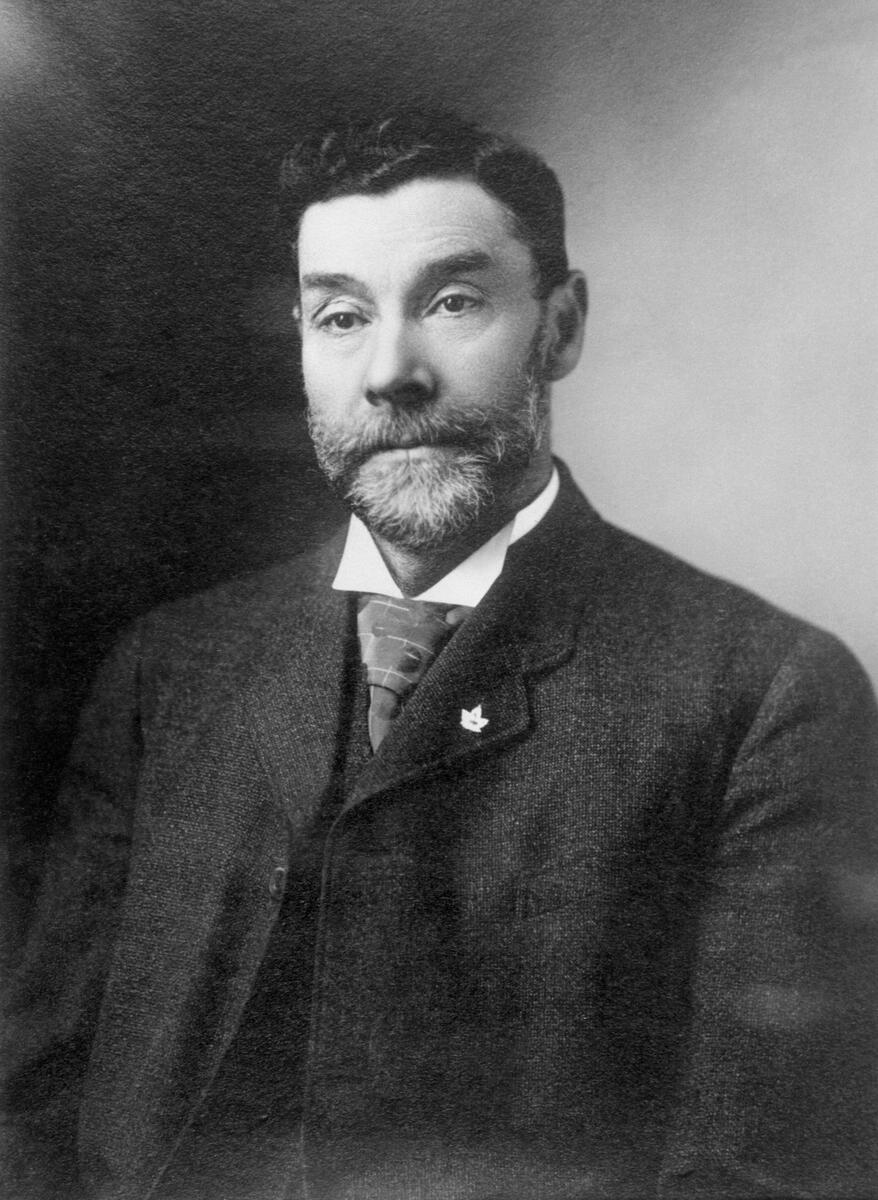

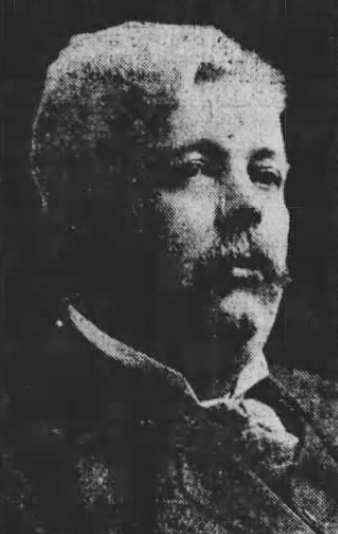
Candidate	George Clift King	John Lineham
Popular vote	195	172
Percentage	53.1%	46.9%
Mayor before election
George Murdoch
Elected mayor
George Clift King

The November 1886 Calgary municipal election was held on November 3, 1886 to elect a Mayor and four Councillors to sit on the third Calgary Town Council from November 4, 1886 to January 16, 1888.

The second Council was terminated by a special Territorial Ordinance effective October 21, 1886 following an order by local Stipendiary Magistrate Jeremiah Travis. Travis contended George Murdoch had tampered with the voters' list and a new council was appointed which failed to garner public support.

== Background ==
=== Election Procedures ===
Voting rights were provided to any male British subject over twenty-one years of age who are assessed on the last revised assessment roll with a minimum property value of $300.

The election was held under Multiple non-transferable vote where each elector was able to cast a ballot for the mayor and up to four ballots for separate councillors.

=== Travis Affair ===
Murdoch along with councillors Issac Sanford Freeze and Dr. Neville James Lindsay were removed from office effective October 21, 1886 by a special Territorial Ordinance issued by stipendiary magistrate Jeremiah Travis.

Travis, a teetotaler and supporter of the temperance movement, was appalled by the open traffic of liquor, gambling and prostitution in Calgary despite legal prohibition in the Northwest Territories. Murdoch and the town solicitor Henry Bleeker were alleged to be members of a whisky ring, and rumors were rampant that both Murdoch and the town's police chief James Ingram was receiving kickbacks from brothels and saloon keepers. Travis' behavior would soon reach Ottawa and Judge Thomas Wardlaw Taylor of Winnipeg was sent by the federal government to investigate the situation. Taylor's report "Precis of the case of Jeremiah Travis (late stipendiary magistrate at Calgary) as presented by the report of Mr. Justice Taylor and the correspondence and evidence" which found Travis had exceeded his authority was released much later in June 1887.

Shortly before the 1886 election, G. E. Marsh brought a charge of corruption against Murdoch and council over irregularities in the voters' list. Travis found Murdoch and the councillors guilty, disqualifying them from running in the 1886 election, barring them from municipal office for two years, and fining Murdoch $100, and the councillors $20. Taylor notes Council added about 78 names to the voter list without notice of sworn testimony, but the names added appeared to have the qualifications necessary to be entitled to be on the voters list. Taylor found treating the actions of council as a case of personal corruption was erroneous in law and irregular in form. Furthermore, Taylor noted the punishment of removal from office, disqualification from re-election for two years and fines "extreme". Taylor also notes when the voters' list was being revised and the "corrupt practices" were occurring, Murdoch was visiting his former home in Eastern Canada and not in Calgary.

The election occurred as planned in on January 6, 1886 with Murdoch and the councillors on the ballot and the "irregular voter list" in use. Travis served the Returning Officer with a judicial order forbidding him from receiving any vote for Murdoch which would have the effect of showing Murdoch's opponents having received a majority of the vote. The returning officer ignored Travis' order as there was no authority for it to be issued. The final result of the election showed Murdoch with a majority 180 votes and his opponent James Reilly with 18. Of the 78 names irregularly added to the voters' list, only 41 votes were cast.

Travis would find Murdoch in contempt of court and disallowed the result of the election, instead installing James Reilly as mayor and other members as the council. The municipal government under Mayor Reilly was ineffective when the town's books and seal disappeared.

The federal government would act before officially receiving Taylor's report by reorganized the courts of the Northwest Territories, and the Territorial Council called for a new municipal election in Calgary on November 3, 1886. George Clift King would defeat opponent John Lineham for the office of Mayor of Calgary.

=== Calgary Fire of 1886 ===
The election took place 11 months before the Calgary Fire of 1886 which destroyed much of downtown Calgary. Part of the slow response to the fire can be attributed to the absence of functioning local government during 1886. As neither George Murdoch or James Reilly was capable of effectively governing the town, the newly ordered chemical engine for the recently organized Calgary Fire Department (Calgary Hook, Ladder and Bucket Corps) was held in the Canadian Pacific Railway's storage yard due to lack of payment. Members of the Calgary Hook, Ladder and Bucket Corps would break into the storage yard on the day of the fire to retrieve the engine.

== Results ==
=== Mayor ===
November 1886 Calgary municipal election: Mayor
Party	Candidate	Votes	%	Elected
-	George Clift King	195	53.13%	✓
-	John Lineham	172	46.87%	–
Total valid votes		367	–	–
Source(s) Calgary Herald, November 6, 1886.

=== Councillors ===
Election conducted using Plurality block voting. Each voter could cast up to four votes. A total of 1309 votes were cast for aldermanic candidates. Perhaps 328 cast a ballot in the aldermanic contest. (Percentage indicated is percentage of votes, not percentage of voters who endorsed the candidate.)

November 1886 Calgary municipal election: Councillor
Party	Candidate	Votes	%	Elected
-	James Morris Martin	285	21.77%	✓
-	Arthur Edwin Shelton	253	19.33%	✓
-	Alexander Allan	223	17.04%	✓
-	John Ellis	203	15.51%	✓
-	Joseph Bannerman	174	13.29%	
-	A. Ferland	171	13.06%	
Source(s) Election was held under multiple non-transferable vote where each elector was able to cast a ballot for the mayor and up to four ballots for separate councillors. Full name of unsuccessful candidates is not known.

== See also ==
- List of Calgary municipal elections

== Sources ==
- Frederick Hunter: THE MAYORS AND COUNCILS OF THE CORPORATION OF CALGARY Archived March 3, 2020
