= 1898 Calgary municipal election =

Election in Alberta, Canada

- December 12, 1898
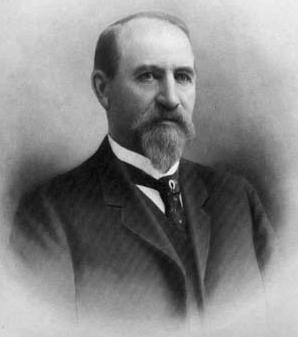

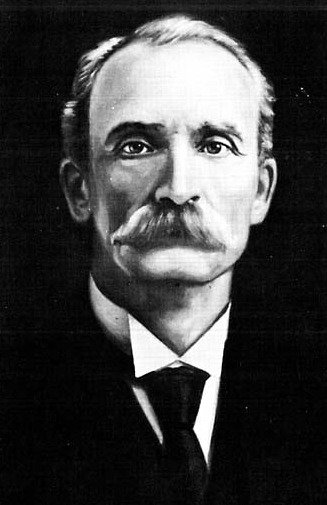
Candidate	James Reilly	Silas Alexander Ramsay
Popular vote	185	167
Percentage	52.56%	47.44%
Mayor before election
Arthur Leslie Cameron
Elected mayor
James Reilly

The 1898 Calgary municipal election was held on December 12, 1898 to elect a Mayor and nine Councilors to sit on the fifteenth Calgary City Council from January 3, 1899 to January 2, 1900.

== Background ==
Voting rights were provided to any male, single woman, or widowed British subject over twenty-one years of age who are assessed on the last revised assessment roll with a minimum property value of $200.

The election was held under multiple non-transferable vote where each elector was able to cast a ballot for the mayor and up to three ballots for separate councillors with a voter's designated ward.

== Results ==
=== Mayor ===
1898 Calgary municipal election: Mayor
Party	Candidate	Votes	%	Elected
-	James Reilly	185	52.53%	✓
-	Silas Alexander Ramsay	167	47.44%	
Total valid votes		352	-	

=== Councillors ===
==== Ward 1 ====
1898 Calgary municipal election: Councillor Ward 1
Party	Candidate	Votes	%	Elected
-	Solomon Sheldwyn Spafford	118	29.35%	✓
-	Robert Wilson Begley	117	29.10%	✓
-	James Alexander McKenzie	114	28.36%	✓
-	H. Riddell	53	13.18%	
Source(s) Election was held under multiple non-transferable vote where each elector was able to cast a ballot for the mayor and up to three ballots for separate councillors.

==== Ward 2 ====
1898 Calgary municipal election: Councillor Ward 2
Party	Candidate	Votes	%	Elected
-	James Stuart Mackie	131	30.05%	✓
-	Robert John Hutchings	117	26.83%	✓
-	Thomas O'Brien	115	26.38%	✓
-	William Mahon Parslow	73	16.74%	
Source(s) Election was held under multiple non-transferable vote where each elector was able to cast a ballot for the mayor and up to three ballots for separate councillors.

==== Ward 3 ====
1898 Calgary municipal election: Councillor Ward 3
Party	Candidate	Votes	%	Elected
-	Thomas Underwood	59	31.38%	✓
-	George Albert Allen	57	30.32%	✓
-	Isaac Stephen Gerow Van Wart	47	25.00%	✓
-	Ralph Bell	25	13.30%	
Source(s) Election was held under multiple non-transferable vote where each elector was able to cast a ballot for the mayor and up to three ballots for separate councillors.

== By-elections ==
Councilor George Albert Allen submitted his resignation to City Council effective April 20, 1899. William Henry Cushing won a by-election held on May 8, 1899 defeating Crispin E. Smith 52-22.

== See also ==
- List of Calgary municipal elections
