= George Clift King =

Canadian politician

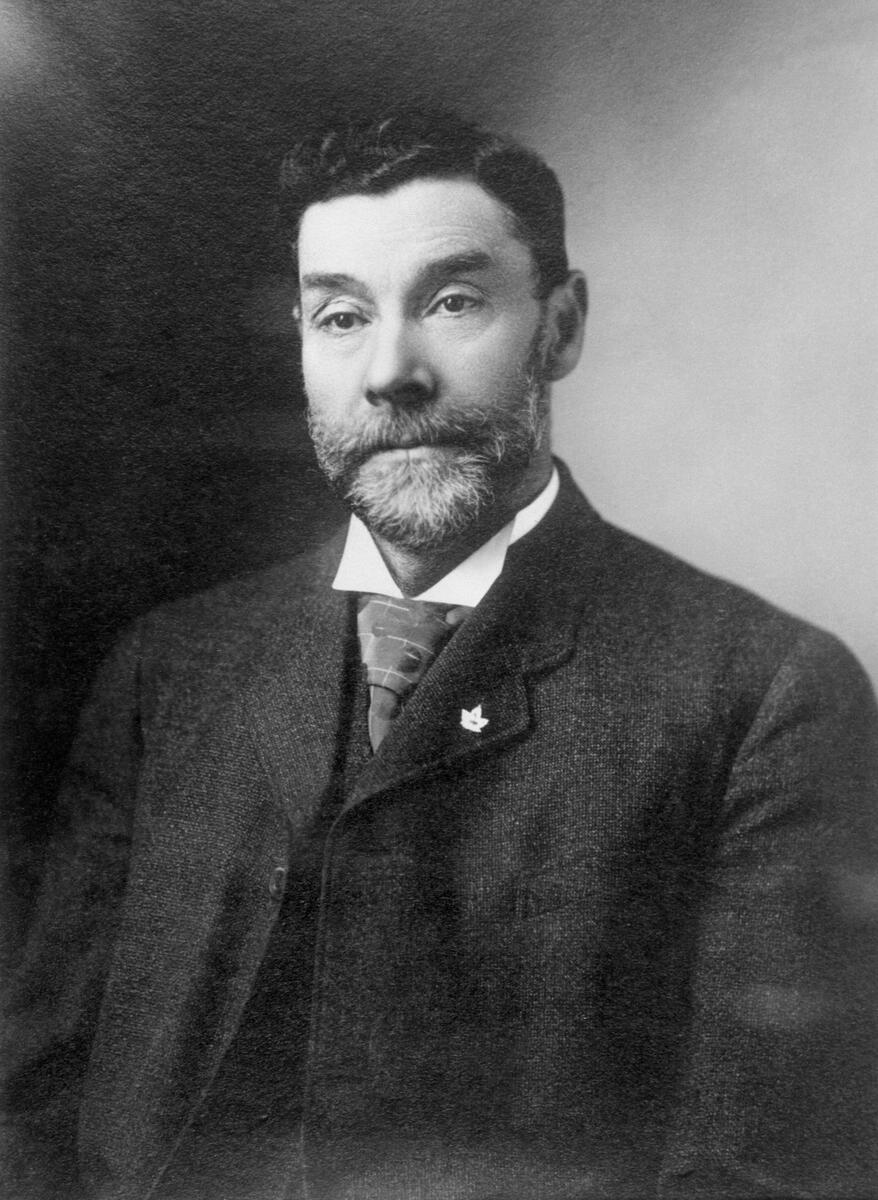

2nd Mayor of Calgary
- In office November 4, 1886 – January 16, 1888
- Preceded by: George Murdoch
- Succeeded by: Arthur Edwin Shelton

Personal details
- Born: April 23, 1848 Chelmsford, England
- Died: July 18, 1935 (aged 87) Calgary, Alberta

George Clift King OBE (April 23, 1848 – July 18, 1935) was the second mayor of the town of Calgary, Alberta.

== Early life ==
King was born in Chelmsford, England in 1848. At the age of 26, he left England for Canada, arriving in Toronto, Ontario, in 1874.

== North-West Mounted Police ==
King joined the North-West Mounted Police and was part of the first contingent sent west to establish Fort Calgary in 1875. Constable King is often called Calgary's First Citizen, since he was the first NWMP officer to cross the Bow River and set foot on the future site of Calgary. This title is also sometimes given to Sam Livingston, another Calgary pioneer who arrived in the Calgary area in 1874; however, Calgary's first European settler was John Glenn who settled at Fish Creek in 1873. According to his scrip record, Antoine Godin, a Métis, had taken up more-or-less permanent residence in the vicinity of Calgary as early as 1870.

== Life in Calgary ==
King left the NWMP in 1877 to manage the first store in Calgary, the I. G. Baker Store. In November 1879, he married Louise Munro. Louise was the daughter of Métis fur trader, Felix Munro, and Louise Laderoute. She was also the granddaughter of famed plainsman Hugh "Rising Wolf" Munro and his Piikani wife. Together, George Clift King and Louise Munro were the first couple married in Calgary. Together they had four children. His son Edward (1885–1970) became a well-known ice hockey player in Calgary, and also played professionally with the Ottawa Senators in 1911–12.

In 1882, King started his own store G. C. King & Co. which sold a wide variety of goods including groceries, clothing, drugs, stationery and tobacco. King's store housed the local post office, and in 1885, King was appointed postmaster, and held this position for 36 years.

King was the mayor of the town of Calgary in the November 1886 Calgary municipal election, defeating John Lineham and served in the role from November 4, 1886, to January 16, 1888. King was elected following the Travis Affair where Mayor George Murdoch along with councillors Issac Sanford Freeze and Dr. Neville James Lindsay were removed from office effective October 21, 1886, by a special Territorial Ordinance issued by Stipendiary Magistrate Jeremiah Travis on allegations that Mayor Murdoch tampered with the voters' list in the prior election. Travis appointed James Reilly, the runner-up as Mayor, and Calgary was effectively without a local government until Justice Thomas Wardlaw Taylor was dispatched by the federal government to investigate and resolve the issue. King also spent four years as town councillor.

After his retirement as postmaster in 1921, he opened a tobacco and confectionery counter in MacLean's Drug Store on Eighth Avenue. King ran this business until his death in 1935. King was inducted into the Order of the British Empire on January 1, 1934, by King George V.

King was laid to rest in Calgary's Union Cemetery. On June 22, 2000, a monument was placed at King's grave and the grave of James Colvin, as they had been unmarked for several years. This was done as part of the 125-year anniversary celebrations of Calgary.

Preceded by George Murdoch	Mayor of Calgary; 1886–1888	Succeeded by Arthur Edwin Shelton
