= Howard Douglas Creek =

Stream in the country of Canada

Coordinates: 51.10003°N 115.6688°W

Howard Douglas Creek is a stream in Alberta, Canada.

Howard Douglas Creek has the name of Howard Douglas, a national park official.

== See also ==
- List of rivers of Alberta
