= Sam Livingston =

Pioneering Irish settler in Canada (1831–97)

Statue of Sam Livingston, placed in Calgary's airport. The plate states "Sam Livingston, Calgary's first citizen".

Samuel Henry Harkwood Livingston (4 February 1831 – 4 October 1897) born in Ireland, he came to Canada following an unsuccessful venture in the Californian gold rush of 1849, and eventually found his way to Jumping Pound, North-West Territories, in 1873 where he opened a trading post. He was going to settle near the confluence of the Bow and Elbow Rivers in 1875 but, when the North-West Mounted Police (NWMP) arrived and established Fort Calgary, Livingston and his family moved further up the Elbow River to the current location of the Glenmore Reservoir. When the Glenmore Dam was built and the area flooded, part of the Livingston house was preserved and now stands at Heritage Park. Sam Livingston was an important man to Alberta's history. The Glenmore Reservoir gets its name from Sam too; Sam and Jane started a school on their farm that Sam named 'Glenmore School' after a place in Ireland. Glenmore is a village in County Kilkenny and quite close to his birthplace in County Wicklow.

Livingston married Jane Howse in 1865 and settled at Fort Victoria for a while. He also started a business which included trading for buffalo hides. By 1874 he had relocated his operations southward to be closer to the trade with the plains Indians and was doing business near the Roman Catholic mission, Our Lady of Peace, on the Elbow River. In the summer of 1876 Livingston moved with his family closer to Fort Calgary, the newly established NWMP post on the river. Here, in 1876, he began cultivation and with John Glenn was one of the first farmers in the area.

Livingston was a great innovator who brought the first examples of mechanized equipment to farming in the Calgary area. Some people call Livingston "Calgary's first citizen", but George Clift King is also given that title. In fact John Glenn was the first documented European settler in the Calgary area, in 1873. In 1872, Alexis Cardinal (Métis) had built a shack for Father Constantine Scollen. In March 1873, Scollen moved there and established the first mission to the Blackfoot Confederacy in what would later become Alberta.

In the months before the 1885 North-West Rebellion, Livingston and John Glenn helped found the Alberta Settler Rights Association. Livingston spoke at the founding meeting that he was aggrieved because it had been difficult for him to get title to land he had used for years. He said he knew of 40 or 50 settlers who had been driven out of the country because they could not get land and that too much of the land was "all taken up by leases or reserves of some kind." The Association passed a statement that "we most earnestly impress upon the government the necessity of granting [to NWT Metis the privileges already granted in Manitoba] as the only way of removing the present discontent and of quieting the disturbances that have already arisen in these territories."

Sam Livingston died in 1897 shortly after the birth of his 14th child. His funeral procession was 40 carriages long.
