= Eddie King (ice hockey) =

Canadian ice hockey player

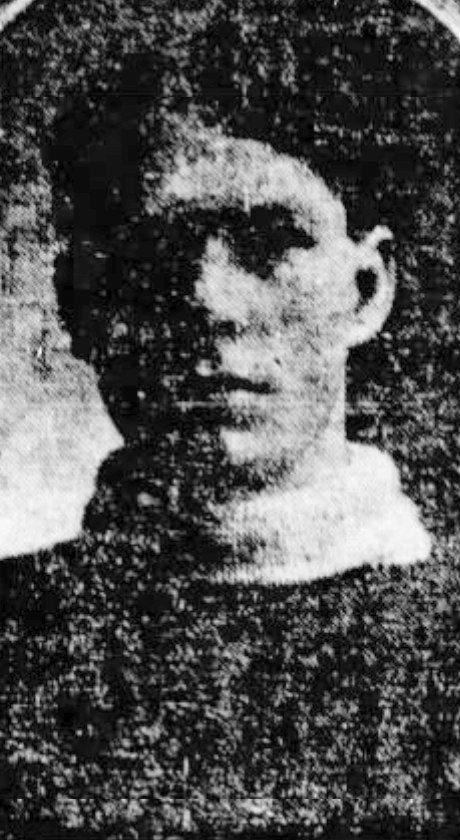
- King c. 1911
- Born: July 10, 1885; Calgary, Northwest Territories, Canada
- Died: June 10, 1970 (aged 84)
- Position: Left wing
- Played for: Ottawa Senators
- Playing career: 1906–1919

Edward King (July 10, 1885 – June 10, 1970) was a Canadian professional ice hockey player from Calgary. He played with the Ottawa Senators of the National Hockey Association during the 1911–12 season.

King was not only one of the first professional hockey players from Western Canada, but he was also considered to have had one of the hardest shots in hockey at the time.

He was the son of Calgary's second mayor, George Clift King, and his Métis wife, Louise Munro.
