= Calgary Fire Department =

Fire service of Calgary, Alberta, Canada

Agency overview
- Established: 1885 (Calgary Hook, Ladder and Bucket Corps)
- Annual calls: 92,918 (2024)
- Employees: 1600 (all staff)
- Fire chief: Steve Dongworth

Facilities and equipment
- Stations: 43

Website
- Calgary Fire Department

The Calgary Fire Department (CFD) provides fire services for the city of Calgary, Alberta.

The department was created on 25 August 1885 as the Calgary Hook, Ladder and Bucket Corps.

As of October 2024, the department has 43 stations. The departments employs over 1,500 personnel in both operational and support roles. Their headquarters is located at 4144 11th Street SE.

== History ==
The department was created on 25 August 1885 as the Calgary Hook, Ladder and Bucket Corps and a chemical engine was ordered soon after. The first Captain was George Constantine. Prior to the formation of the Corps, wells had been dug throughout the town in 1884 at the recommendation of George Murdoch, Mayor of the Town of Calgary. In November 1886, Calgary experienced a conflagration, which would become to be known as the Calgary Fire of 1886. Before the fire there was much disorder in the town due to both George Murdoch and James Riley claiming to be and acting as Mayor. This resulted in a slow response to the fire which can be attributed to the absence of a functioning local government. As neither George Murdoch or James Reilly was capable of effectively governing the town, the newly ordered chemical engine was held in the Canadian Pacific Railway storage yard due to lack of payment. Members of the department broke into the CPR storage yard on the day of the fire to retrieve the engine. Later that month a meeting was held which saw Steve Jarrett be elected as the first chief and Bob Ogburn as Assistant Chief. May 1887 saw the opening of Calgary's first fire hall: which had been recommended at the meeting in November 1886, and was approved by Town Council shortly after.

In 1887, following a disagreement between Town Council and the current fire brigade, current Chief Frank Dick and his members resigned. They sold their furniture at the fire hall and donated the proceeded to the hospital. Following the resignation of the brigade, the Mayor and Council proceeded to appoint a high salaried chief and organize a brigade. The new brigade consisted of the Mayor and Council and would-be fire-fighters. When it came to a serious fire, they weren't well organized and in a short time the citizens of Calgary were calling for the reinstatement of the old brigade.

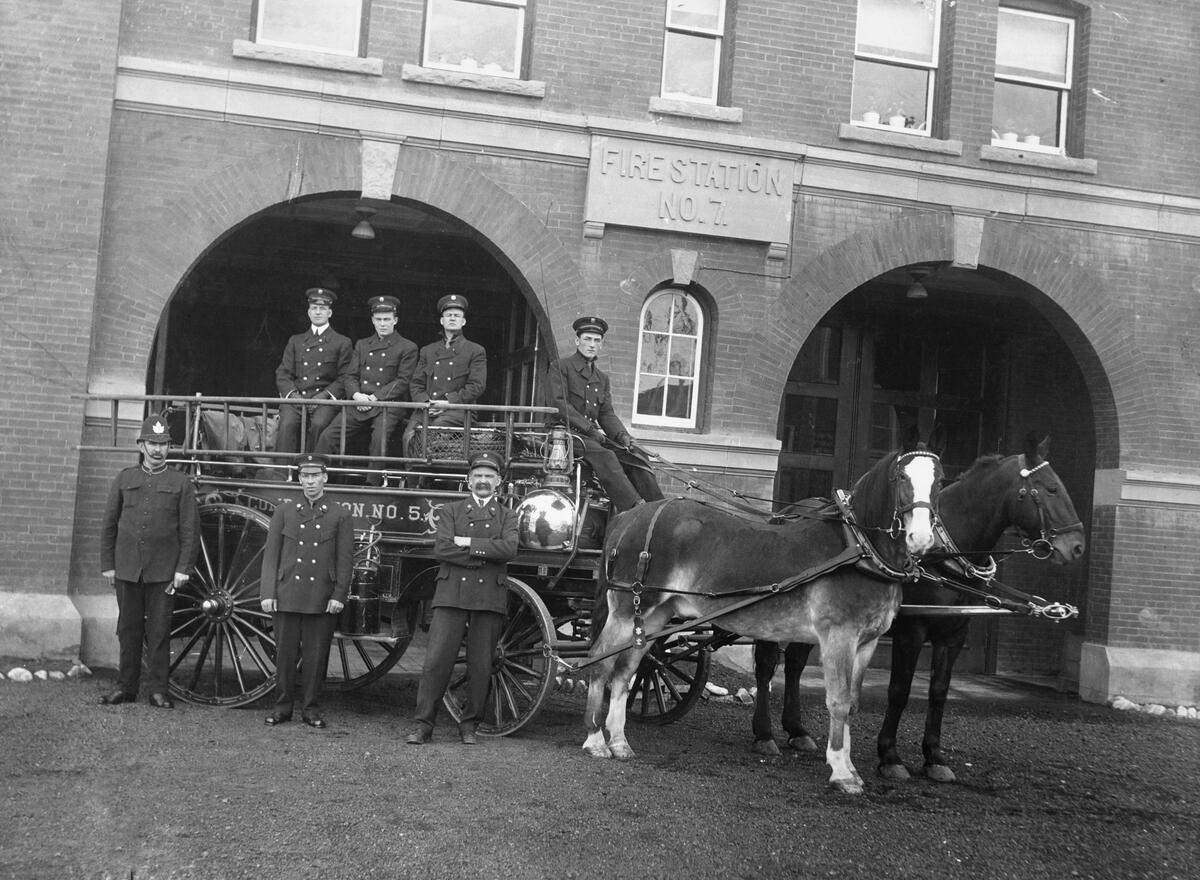
Firemen and wagon c. 1913-1919 outside former Fire Station No. 7, demolished in 1973, at 16th Avenue and 1st Street NW. The only known person is James Butt, second from left, top row.

The reinstatement occurred on 23 July 1889, when a meeting was held and a decision was agreed upon by the two bodies to have the regular brigade again take charge. The hall and appliances were accordingly turned over to the original brigade.

In January 1890, the brigade began to look to purchase band instruments. After receiving instruments, uniforms, music stands, etc. from a Mr. D. W. Marsh a band was organised. The band carried on with varied success under different leaders for a number of years.

In June 1897, a serious flood occurred and the department was called out to rescue residents on the water front. For their services the council gave the department Can$75 .

1901 saw the department hold its first church parade. New uniforms were purchased for the band at a cost of about Can$500. During the visit of the Duke and Duchess of York during this year, the department acted as a special police. They had their hall elaborately decorated but the Duke and Duchess did not see it.

Prior to 1909, it was a volunteer fire department. In 1909, 40 full-time firefighters were hired. In 1910, it purchased its first motorized fire truck.

== Organization ==
=== Fire Suppression Staff ===
==== Chief Officers ====
The Fire Service uses the term "Chief Officer" to describe individuals who are in a Chief role. These "Chief Officers" are responsible for overseeing management functions as well as supervising fire operations and other services. In the Calgary Fire Department, the Chief Officers are:

- Fire Chief – One Chief Officer oversees the entire Calgary Fire Department (CFD)
- Deputy Chief/Manager – Five Chief Officers oversee the individual divisions of the CFD. These divisions are:
  - Operations (Deputy Chief)
  - Operations Support (Deputy Chief)
  - Risk Management (Deputy Chief)
  - Organization Effectiveness & Engagement (Deputy Chief)
  - Workforce Support (Manager)
  - Business Support (Manager)
  - Respect & Inclusion (Leader)
  - Corporate Consultant
- Assistant Deputy Chief – They are tasked to Fire Rescue Services and the remainder of the Assistant Deputy Chiefs are deployed to other divisions where needed.
- Battalion Chief – Firefighters work on a four platoon (shift) system (A, B, C, & D). Each platoon is overseen by a Battalion Chief, so in total there are four Battalion Chiefs.
- District Chief – The city is divided into 6 districts. Each platoon within a district is supervised by a District Chief, therefore there are 6 District Chiefs at any given time (one in each district) and 24 in total. District chiefs are now classified as a number rather than geographical location(Changed in 2023)

==== Company officers ====
Company officers are in charge of each crew. Company officers include:

- Fire Captain – each fire engine (pumper truck) is supervised by a fire captain on each platoon. As there is an engine in each fire hall, the captain is in charge of the fire hall as well.
- Fire Lieutenant – every other fire apparatus is supervised by a lieutenant. These include aerial trucks, rescue trucks, hazmat trucks, etc. Every hall has an engine, but only select halls have other apparatus, such as these.

==== Firefighters ====
Firefighters are the main workforce of the fire department. They include:

- Senior Firefighter – one on each Fire Engine (pumper truck)
- Firefighter – drive the trucks and ride in the back
- Probationary Firefighter – placed on Fire Engines as needed, ride in the back with the Senior Firefighter

=== Support Staff ===
The Fire Department relies on numerous uniformed day staff to fill various roles. 255 local, uniformed, support staff members are firefighters who have moved into a different role within the Department. The Fire Marshal oversees the inspectors and investigators within the division of Risk Management. Each Support Section is also run by a Coordinator. These include:

- Hazardous Materials Coordinator
- Emergency Management Coordinator
- Technical Teams Coordinator
- Recruitment Coordinator
- Fire Inspections Coordinator
- Fire Investigation Coordinator
- Health and Safety Coordinator
- Community Safety Coordinator
- Training Coordinators
- Medical Services Coordinator

Day Staff divisions also have Officers which include:

- Hazardous Materials Officers
- Recruitment Officers
- Health and Safety Officers
- Community Safety Officers
- Safety Codes Officers
- Technical Services Officers
- Public Information Officer
- Training Officers
- Fire Investigators

The Fire Department also employs many other civilian staff in numerous roles.

== Rank Insignia ==
=== Fire Suppression Staff ===
	CHIEF OFFICERS					COMPANY OFFICERS		FIREFIGHTERS		
	Fire Chief	Deputy Chief	Assistant Deputy Chief	Battalion Chief	District Chief	Fire Captain	Fire Lieutenant	Senior Firefighter	Firefighter	Recruit Firefighter
Rank Epaulettes								No Insignia	No Insignia	Blue Striped Epaulettes (at Training only)

=== Emergency Medical Technician or Paramedic ===
If a Firefighter, Company Officer, or Chief Officer is also qualified as a Primary Care Paramedic or Advanced Care Paramedic, they wear the Star of Life insignia on their fire helmet.

=== Support Staff ===
	Fire Marshal	Support Staff Coordinators	Support Staff Officers	Fire Inspector I
Rank Epaulettes		Division Name Embroidered Below Stripes (ex: Training, Community Safety, etc.)	Division Name Embroidered Below Stripes (ex: Training, Community Safety, etc.)	"Safety Codes Officer" Embroidered Below Stripe
Notes	Head of the Fire Investigations and Inspections	Health and Safety Coordinator / Fire Inspections Coordinator / Fire Investigations Coordinator / Hazardous Materials Coordinator / Emergency Management Coordinator / Technical Teams Coordinator / Community Services Coordinator / Wellness and Fitness Coordinator / Recruitment Coordinator / Technical Teams Coordinator / Medical Services Coordinator / Training Coordinator	Training Officer / Health and Safety Officer / Hazardous Materials Officer / Emergency Management Officer / Public Information Officer / Community Safety Officer / Assistant to the Medical Director / Technical Services Officer / Fire Inspector II / Shift Investigator	

=== Helmet Colors ===
Fire Suppression Staff	Helmet Colour
Chief Officers: Fire Chief; Deputy Chief; Assistant Deputy Chief; Battalion Chief; District Chief	WHITE
Company Officers: Fire Captain; Fire Lieutenant; Acting Fire Lieutenant	RED
Firefighters: Senior Firefighter; Firefighter; Probationary Firefighter	YELLOW
Support Staff	
Fire Marshal	WHITE
Support Staff Coordinators: Hazardous Materials Coordinator; Emergency Management Coordinator; Health and Safety Coordinator; Wellness & Fitness Coordinator; Recruitment Coordinator	BLUE
Training Officer	RED
Support Staff Officers: Health and Safety Officer; Hazardous Materials Officer; Medical Services Officer; Public Information Officer; Community Safety Officer; Safety Codes Officers (Fire Inspector I and II)	BLUE
Fire Cadet Observer	BLACK

== Fire Stations and Apparatus ==
- There are 43 fire stations in Calgary, operating 24 hours a day.
- Apparatus designations are denoted by the station number followed by the apparatus type.
- Calgary International Airport Crash Rescue previously operated as CFD Station 13 until 1 June 2019, when the airport contracted firefighting services to Pro-Tec Fire Services of Canada.
- In 2022, City of Calgary announced Station 3 will be located at 1212 11 Ave SE.
- Apparatus with mounted ladders have been name changed from Aerials to either Ladders (Straight stick ladder) or Towers (Ladder with platform) in 2023.
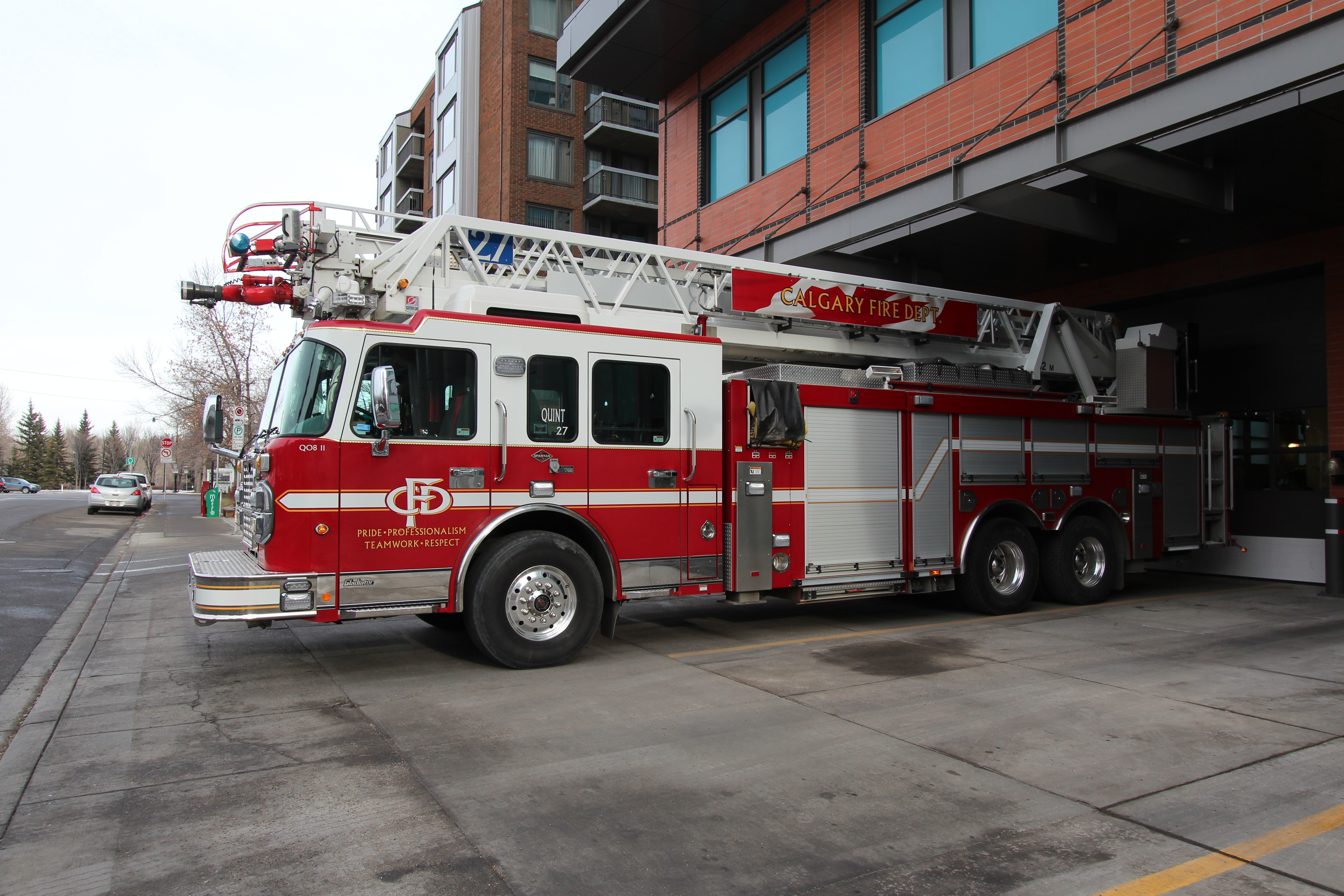
  Ladder truck at Station 6, Eau Claire, 2013

No.	Neighbourhood	Engine(s)	Ladder	Rescue	Miscellaneous	Address	Build Year
Department Headquarters	Highfield				Safety Chief, Chiefs Vehicle (x2), CFD Community Outreach Car, Haztec 1&3, Hazmat Support, CFD Shuttle Transport, Misc. Vehicle	4144 11 Street S.E.	2017
1	Downtown	1 Engine, Engine 301	1 Ladder,		1 RRV (medical response unit)	450 1 Street S.E.	1973
2	Beltline	2 Engine, Engine 302			2 High Rise Support, 2 Parkade Unit, 2 RRV (Medical Unit),	1010 10 Avenue S.W.	1971
4	Vista Heights	4 Engine			4 Haz-Mat, 4 Air/Light,	1991 18 Avenue N.E.	2004
5	South Calgary	5 Engine			District Chief 2 Investigator 1	3129 14 Street S.W.	2012
6	Eau Claire	6 Engine	6 Ladder	6 Aquatic Rescue	6 Boat Tow, 6 Jet Boat	360 8 Street S.W.	2010
7	Mount Pleasant	7 Engine				2708 4 St NW	2017
8	Rosscarrock	8 Engine	8 Ladder	8 Rescue	8 Bush Buggy	1720 45 Street S.W.	1980
9	Ogden	9 Engine				2515 78 Avenue S.E.	1981
10	Briar Hill	10 Engine		10 Technical Rescue	10 Technical Support	1909 16 Avenue N.W.	1998
11	Windsor Park	11 Engine		11 Technical Rescue	11 Technical Support	5506 4 Street S.W.	2014
12	Marlborough	12 Engine, Engine 312		12 Ladder		123 44 Street S.E.	1974
14	Haysboro	14 Engine, Engine 314				9840 Horton Road S.W.	1989
15	Bowness	15 Engine				6328 35 Avenue N.W.	1964
16	Highfield	16 Engine			District Chief 1, Battalion Chief, Air Monitoring Vehicle, Pod Truck 1&2, Mobile Command Unit Flood pod, Hazmat pod (x2), Mobile Fan, 16 Rat-Rail, 16 Hazmat Recovery	4124 11 Street S.E.	2018
17	Varsity	17 Engine	17 Ladder		17 Haz-Mat	3740 32 Avenue N.W.	1971
18	Huntington Hills	18 Engine				415 68 Avenue N.W.	1975
19	Parkland	19 Engine	19 Tower			13807 Parkland Boulevard S.E.	1975
20	Lincoln Park	20 Engine			District Chief 3	2800 Peacekeepers Way S.W.	1978
21	Silver Springs	21 Engine		21 Tender 21 Boat 21 Boat Tow	District Chief 4	209 Silvergrove Drive N.W.	1978
22	Temple	22 Engine, Engine 322				7199 Temple Drive N.E	1979
23	Southview	23 Engine	23 Rescue			2727 26 Avenue S.E.	1982
24	Cedarbrae	24 Engine				2607 106 Avenue S.W.	1978
25	Foothills	25 Engine	25 Tower		25 Tender	4705 76 Avenue S.E.	1982
26	Midnapore	26 Engine		26 Rescue		450 Midpark Way S.E.	2002
27	Stonegate	27 Engine		27 Rescue		110-11358 Barlow Trail N.E.	2017
28	Edgemont	28 Engine				7925 Edgemont Boulevard N.W.	1987
29	Coach Hill	29 Engine				7027 Coach Hill Road S.W.	1988
30	McKenzie Towne	30 Engine	30 Ladder		30 Boat Tow, 30 Jet Boat	6 McKenzie Towne Gate S.E.	1998
31	Country Hills	31 Engine	31 Tower		31 Bush Buggy, 31 Generator	11955 Country Village Link N.E.	2005
32	Saddle Ridge	32 Engine	32 Ladder		District Chief 5	800 Saddletowne Circle N.E.	2010
33	Signal Hill	33 Engine				3800 69 Street S.W.	2008
34	Royal Vista	34 Engine	34 Ladder		34 Rescue	16 Royal Vista Way N.W.	2016
35	Valley Ridge	35 Engine				11280 Valley Ridge Boulevard N.W.	2009
36	Hidden Valley	36 Engine				10071 Hidden Valley Drive N.W.	2001
37	Evergreen	37 Engine				2511 Eversyde Avenue S.W.	2013
38	Cornerstone	38 Engine				128 Cornerstone Hts N.E.	2025
39	Douglas Glen	39 Engine		39 Rescue	District Chief 6, Investigator 2, K-9 unit, 39 Hazmat	4199 114 Ave S.E.	2012
40	Symons Valley	40 Engine				12920 Symons Valley Road N.W.	2013
41	Seton	41 Engine				3790 Seton Drive S.E.	2013
42	Tuscany	42 Engine				275 Tuscany Way N.W.	2018
43	Walden	43 Engine				969 Walden Dr SE	2020
44	Livingston	44 Engine				1248 Livingston Way N.E.	2021
45.	Belvedere	45 Engine				#2000, 250 East Hills Square S.E.	2023 (Temporary)
