= Daniel Webster Marsh =

Canadian businessman and politician

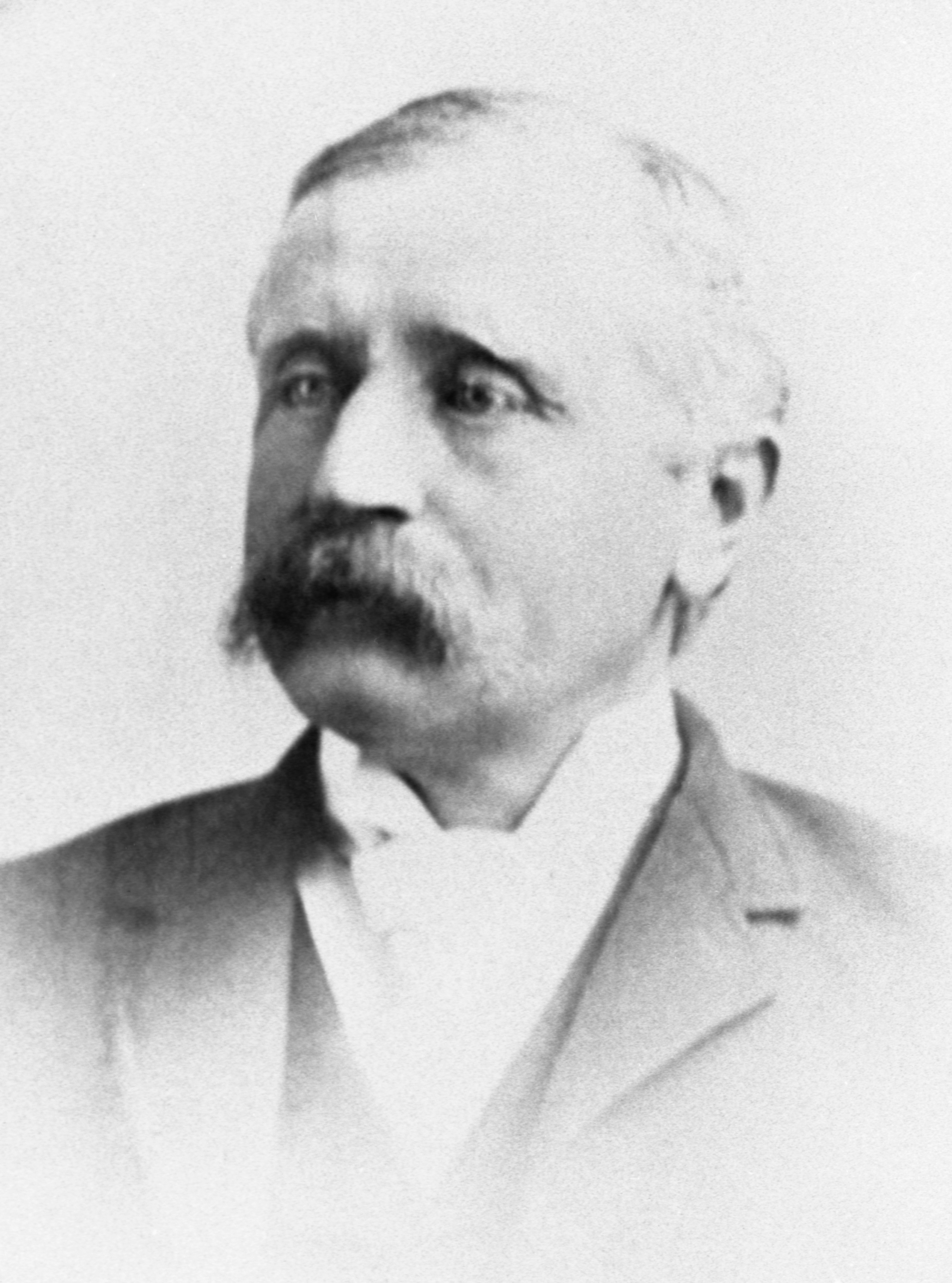

4th Mayor of Calgary
- In office January 21, 1889 – January 20, 1890
- Preceded by: Arthur Edwin Shelton
- Succeeded by: James Delamere Lafferty

Personal details
- Born: August 15, 1838 Hudson, New Hampshire, U.S.
- Died: June 27, 1916 (aged 77) Calgary, Alberta, Canada

Daniel Webster Marsh (August 15, 1838 – June 27, 1916) was a businessman and 4th mayor of Calgary, Alberta, Canada. He was born in the United States, at Hudson, New Hampshire to Enoch Sawyer March and Margaret Whittier.

Marsh spent his youth in Nashua, New Hampshire, attending the public schools, and starting his working career there. As a young man, he served with the 30th Wisconsin Infantry Regiment and was a part of the Dakota Territory Indian campaigns.

By 1876 Marsh was managing a small general store in Fort Benton, Montana, after which he joined the Fort Benton firm T. C. Power and Bro and in 1876 moved to Fort Walsh (in Saskatchewan) to manage their store, remaining at that post until 1883. As the Canadian Pacific Railway moved west, Marsh saw the opportunity to open up new stores for the company; he opened a store in Maple Creek, Saskatchewan in 1883, and opened a Calgary branch in 1884, remaining as manager of that post until 1893. He arranged for his nephew, Horace A. Greeley, to manage the store in Maple Creek.

Marsh became a prominent moneylender soon after his arrival in Calgary. In 1887 he married Julia Wood Shurtliff, the widow of North-West Mounted Police superintendent Albert Shurtliff. They had one daughter. T. C. Power and Bro. sold the Calgary store to Marsh in 1893, and he continued operating it until 1901.

Marsh served one term as mayor of the town of Calgary, winning by acclamation in the 1889 election and serving from January 21, 1889, to January 20, 1890.

Upon his death in Calgary, his estate was appraised at $351,000. The majority of his estate was left to Julia, who died two years later.
