= John Glenn (Alberta) =

Pioneering Irish settler in Canada (1833–86)

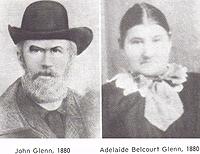
- John Glenn and Adelaide
- Born: John Glenn; 1833; County Mayo, Ireland
- Died: 1886 (aged 52–53); Calgary, Alberta
- Known for: First documented European settler in Calgary

John Glenn (1833 in County Mayo, Ireland – January 9, 1886, in Calgary, Alberta) was the first documented European to settle in the Calgary area of Alberta, Canada. He was an Irish immigrant who first settled in the United States in 1849 and served in the American Civil War. He then travelled to British Columbia before settling in Calgary in 1873 with his wife, Adelaide (née Belcourt), and built a small log cabin near the confluence of Fish Creek and the Bow River in today's Fish Creek Provincial Park.

== Early life ==
John Glenn was born in County Mayo, Ireland in 1833. As a young man, he travelled to England. He was homesick for his native country so started to travel home, however, he changed his mind just a few miles from his father's home and went back to England.

From Liverpool, he took a ship to New York at the age of 16. Upon arriving he travelled to Waco, Texas, where he took employment on a ranch. In 1861, he was drafted into the Confederate Army, however, as he did not believe in slavery, so he deserted and joined the Northern Federal Army. He served during this period under General William Tecumseh Sherman until the end of the Civil War in 1865.

He then travelled around the United States, working in mines, and in 1867 he moved to British Columbia and then to Barkerville (along with James Votier and Sam Livingston who later became his neighbours in the Calgary area).

At the age of 40 he decided, in 1873, to settle down and married Adelaide Belcourt of Lac Ste. Anne. The marriage took place in the mission in St. Albert (built by Father Lacombe twenty years earlier) and the ceremony was performed by Father Leduc.

They then headed out to find good land to settle on. When they reached Fish Creek, they were impressed by the rich soil and decided to make their home there. They built a log cabin in 1873, becoming the first settlers in what is now Calgary. Later, he said "I like the climate better than any I have found between the Atlantic and the Pacific; the Rio Grande and the Peace, over all of which Territory I have travelled. There is everything in the country a settler can desire".

== Trading post ==
Glenn made regular trips to Fort Benton to obtain goods to trade; he made one or two trips a year in the latter part of the 1870s to this end. A crew of men erected a large dwelling, barn, and other buildings, which were completed in 1878–79. This trading post became an established stopping place. Meals were priced at 50 cents each and everyone had to bring their own bed.

During this time Glenn started raising cattle and growing grain. After three years the farm constituted 9 acres (36,000 m^{2}) sown with oats and barley, a garden, and a hay meadow.

== Irrigation system ==
Glenn sold his original farm and trading post to the government on August 1, 1879; their first property became Indian Supply Farm number 24. Once sold, the Glenns moved up the creek to set up another farmstead near the banks of Fish Creek, just east of Macleod Trail in what is now Midnapore, Calgary. There, John Glenn started the construction of his historic irrigation system, which diverted water from Fish Creek to nearby hay fields. This was 19 years before the Alberta Irrigation Company started their first project near Lethbridge, Alberta.

Glenn built an earth and rock dam about a half a mile west of Macleod Trail and diverted water from the creek into a ditch which diverted the water to irrigate his fields east of the Trail. This irrigation scheme also worked to supply water for Glenn's nearest neighbour, William Shaw, who arrived from England in 1883, as well as water for the Shaw's woollen mills.

== Family ==
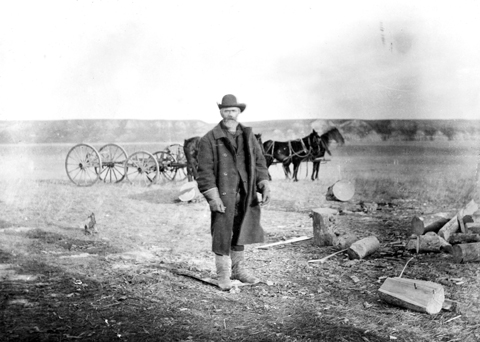
John Glenn

Adelaide and John had eight children, Patrick, John, Alfred, William, Edward, Margaret, Eliza, and Mathilde, (Eliza and Mathilde both died in childhood).

Patrick was the only one to marry and have children. He married Filomene Hodgson, daughter of George Hodgson, Indian Agent at Sarcee Indian Reserve; they had six children.

Glenn's story has an unfortunate ending. It is unclear what happened in late December 1885, shortly after the North-West Rebellion. One story goes that Glenn's horses may have been spooked which resulted in him being thrown from his wagon, which resulted in injury (this is the story reported in the Calgary Herald). Another story is that he and one of his drivers had a difference of opinion which resulted in a fist fight. Regardless of which is true, he never fully recovered and died of pneumonia on January 9, 1886. Glenn is buried in the pioneer section of St. Mary's Cemetery in Calgary.

Adelaide died in her 88th year.

In 1999, the original Glenn home was dismantled by the Archeology Field Studies Team of the University of Calgary; they intended to reconstruct the building in its original site; to date it has not been done and there is no indication when or if this will be done (funding is not currently available).
