= Howard Douglas (park superintendent) =

Previous canadian superintendent and city councillor

Superintendent of Banff National Park
- In office 1896–1909

Councillor on Calgary City Council
- In office January 16, 1888 – January 21, 1889
- In office January 20, 1890 – January 18, 1892
- In office March 6, 1894 – January 7, 1895

Personal details
- Born: May 8, 1850 Halton District, Ontario, Canada
- Died: January 6, 1929 (aged 78) Edmonton, Alberta, Canada
- Occupation: Park's Canada Superintendent

Howard Douglas (May 8, 1850 – January 6, 1929) was a Superintendent for Banff National Park in Alberta, Canada, councillor for Calgary City Council.

== Early life ==
Howard Douglas was born in Halton District, Ontario in 1850. He was the son of Thomas Douglas, a farmer, and the oldest of four boys.

Howard Douglas spent his boyhood and youth in the east. He married Alice Maud Johnston, the daughter of a ship captain, in Burlington, Ontario on October 11, 1872. Around 1883 Douglas moved west to Manitoba, and later in fall 1883 he arrived in Calgary and worked as a construction bridge foreman for the Canadian Pacific Railway. In 1885, he resigned from railway service and established a cartage and coal business under the name of Calgary Cartage Company.

Douglas was elected as a councillor in 1888 and again in 1891. His wife Alice and their three children, Katie, Thomas and Roy joined him in 1885. In 1890, Alice and Howard's fourth child, Ralph Howard, was born in Calgary.

== Working in National Parks ==
In 1896 Howard Douglas was appointed superintendent of Rocky Mountain Park (later named Banff National Park). He was promoted to Commissioner of National Parks in the West in 1911 which necessitated his move to Edmonton in 1909. During his term of office Jasper National Park, Elk Island National Park, Wainwright and Waterton Lakes National Park were opened. Douglas also arranged for the purchase and transfer of the Michael Pablo herd of bison from the state of Montana.

== Later life ==
When he retired from the Parks position in 1921 he was appointed the first moving picture censor for the Province of Alberta. Douglas was a Charter Member of the Calgary Lodge of Independent Order of Oddfellows, and a member of the Banff Masonic Lodge.

Douglas died in Edmonton on January 6, 1929.

== Honours ==
- Mount Howard Douglas, a 2,877-metre (9,439-foot) mountain summit in Banff National Park.
- Howard Douglas Creek, a stream in Alberta.
