= George Murdoch =

Canadian politician (1850–1910)

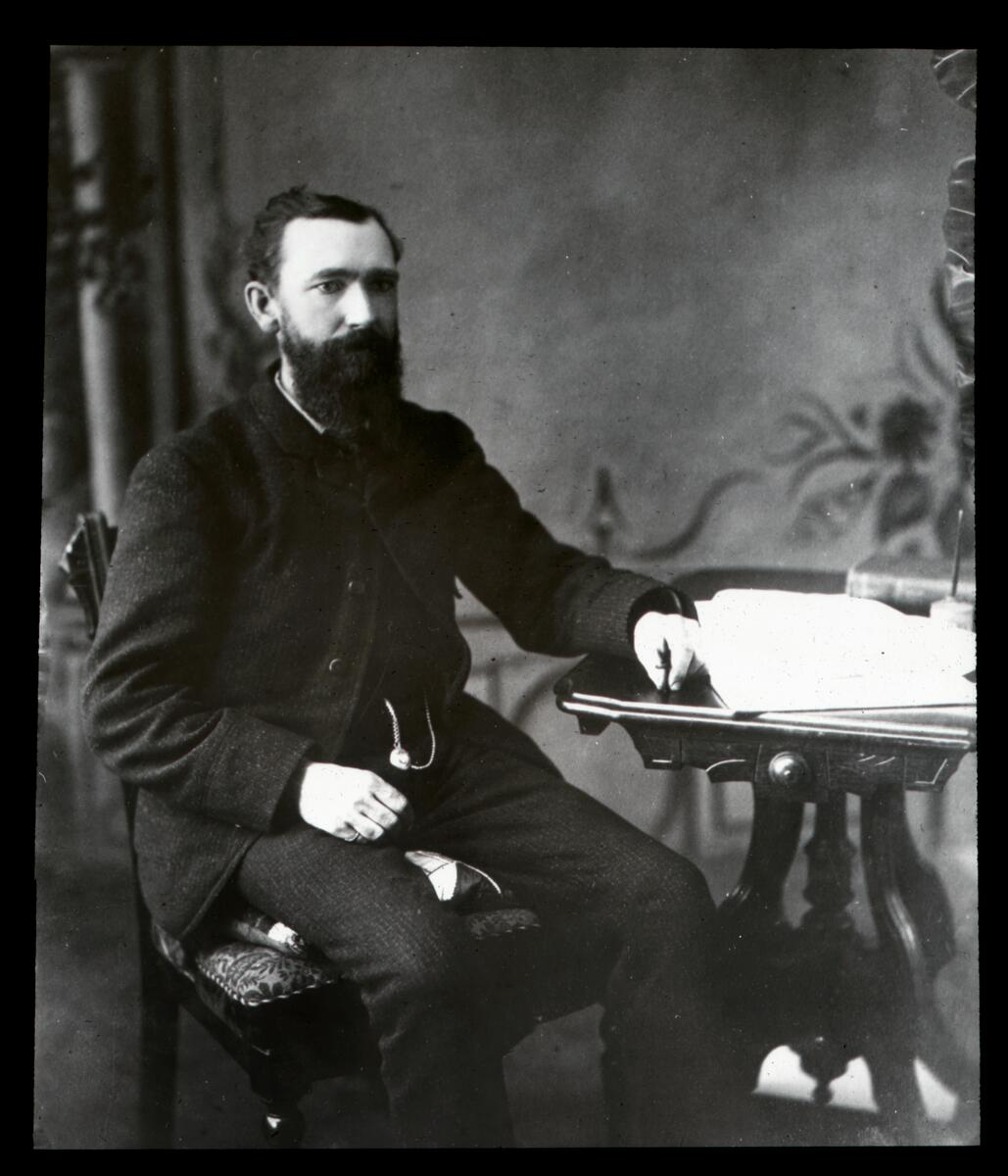

1st Mayor of Calgary
- In office December 4, 1884 – October 21, 1886
- Preceded by: office created
- Succeeded by: George Clift King

Town of Calgary Councillor/Alderman
- In office January 21, 1889 – January 20, 1890
- In office January 7, 1895 – January 6, 1896

Personal details
- Born: April 29, 1850 Paisley, Scotland
- Died: February 2, 1910 (aged 59) Calgary, Alberta

George Murdoch (April 29, 1850 – February 2, 1910) was a Canadian politician, Alberta pioneer, saddle-maker, and the first mayor of Calgary, Alberta.

== Early life ==
George Murdoch was born in Paisley, Scotland, on April 29, 1850, and at the age of four, Murdoch emigrated to Canada in 1854 and settled in Saint John, New Brunswick, where he spent much of his earlier years. At the age of 18 Murdoch moved to Chicago, where he learned the trade of saddle and harness making. Murdoch returned to New Brunswick after his shop was destroyed in the 1871 Great Chicago Fire. While in New Brunswick he married his wife Margaret, and together they had their first two children in the province. (Note: MacEwan (1975), p. 56) In total, they had at least three sons and two daughters.

== Move to Calgary ==
On May 13, 1883, George Murdoch arrived in Calgary at the age of 33, just months before the Canadian Pacific Railway would reach the community in August 1883. (Note: MacEwan (1975), p. 56) In Calgary, he started a successful harness shop. As Calgary was at its early stages, his main clientele was the North-West Mounted Police based in Fort Calgary and Blackfoot Indians who had a reserve nearby. He was on good terms with the Blackfoot and had learned to speak their language.

In the community, Murdoch was involved with the Masonic Lodge and the Orange Order in Canada, literary and history societies, volunteer fire brigade, was one of the founders of Calgary's Presbyterian Church and the first President of the Calgary St. Andrew's Society. Being one of the first permanent businessmen in Calgary, he was an active participant in securing the incorporation of Calgary from the government of the North-West Territories in November 1884.

== Municipal Politics ==
=== George Murdoch on first town council, re-elected in 1886 ===
George Murdoch played a pivotal role in the formation of the Town of Calgary, joining prominent civic leaders as elected members of the seven-person civic committee, the precursor to the first town council. The elected group consisted of Murdoch, Major James Walker (1846-1936), Dr. Andrew Henderson, George Clift King, Thomas Swan, J. D. Moulton and Captain John Stewart (d. 1893). (Note: MacEwan (1975), p. 39)

On December 4, 1884, Murdoch was elected the first mayor of the Town of Calgary. He soon encountered push back from local magistrate Jeremiah Travis and other local residents.

Travis, a teetotaler and supporter of the temperance movement, was appalled by the open traffic of liquor, gambling and prostitution in Calgary despite legal prohibition in the Northwest Territories. Murdoch and the town solicitor Henry Bleeker were alleged to be members of a whisky ring, and rumors were rampant that both Murdoch and the town's police chief James Ingram was receiving kickbacks from brothels and saloon keepers.

In late 1885, G. E. Marsh brought a charge of corruption against Murdoch and council over irregularities in the voters' list. Travis found Murdoch and the councillors guilty, disqualifying them from running in the 1886 election, barring them from municipal office for two years, and fining Murdoch $100, and the councillors $20. Taylor notes Council added about 78 names to the voter list without notice of sworn testimony, but the names added appeared to have the qualifications necessary to be entitled to be on the voters list. Taylor found treating the actions of council as a case of personal corruption was erroneous in law and irregular in form. Furthermore Taylor noted the punishment of removal from office, disqualification from re-election for two years and fines "extreme". Taylor also notes when the voters' list was being revised and the "corrupt practices" were occurring, Murdoch was visiting his former home in Eastern Canada and not in Calgary.

=== January 1886 Calgary Municipal Election ===
The election occurred as planned on January 6, 1886, with Murdoch and the councillors on the ballot and the "irregular voter list" in use. Travis served the returning officer with a judicial order forbidding him from receiving any vote for Murdoch, which would have the effect of showing Murdoch's opponents having received a majority of the vote. The returning officer ignored Travis's order as there was no authority for it to be issued.

The final result of the election showed Murdoch with a majority 180 votes and his opponent James Reilly with 18. Of the 78 names irregularly added to the voters' list, only 41 votes were cast.

Murdoch was re-elected on January 4, 1886.

=== Murdoch versus Travis controversy ===
Murdoch held the post of mayor until October 21, 1886. But in October 1886, Travis found Murdoch in contempt of court and disallowed the result of the January election. A special Territorial Ordinance issued by stipendiary magistrate Jeremiah Travis removed from office Murdoch, as well as councillors Issac Sanford Freeze and Dr. Neville James Lindsay, effective October 21, 1886.

Travis installed James Reilly as mayor and new members of the council. The municipal government under Mayor Reilly was rendered ineffective when the town's books and seal disappeared.

During the Calgary Fire of 1886 it was thought that a firebreak would stop the blaze, and former mayor George Murdoch agreed and participated in the demolishing of his harness shop. Firefighters attempted to use gunpowder to blow up Murdoch's store. However, the attempt "failed owing to the force of the charge not being sufficiently concentrated", according to the Calgary Weekly Herald. (Note: MacEwan (1975), p. 75) The fire break did help stop The fire, and it was extinguished.

Federal authorities learned of Travis's dismissal of Murdoch, and they sent Judge Thomas Wardlaw Taylor of Winnipeg to investigate the situation. Taylor found Travis had exceeded his authority. His report "Precis of the case of Jeremiah Travis (late stipendiary magistrate at Calgary) as presented by the report of Mr. Justice Taylor and the correspondence and evidence" was released much later, in June 1887.

The federal government acted before officially receiving Taylor's report by reorganizing the courts of the Northwest Territories, and the Territorial Council called for a new municipal election in Calgary on November 3, 1886. George Clift King was elected Mayor of Calgary.

=== Later Municipal Politics ===
Murdoch was elected town Councillor in both the 1889 and 1895.

== Later life ==
In later life Murdoch suffered from paralysis, (Note: MacEwan (1975), p. 59) and died in Calgary on February 2, 1910.

== Citations ==
Preceded by (none)	Mayor of Calgary; 1884–1886	Succeeded by George Clift King
