= Arthur Edwin Shelton =

Canadian politician

3rd Mayor of Calgary
- In office January 16, 1888 – January 21, 1889
- Preceded by: George Clift King
- Succeeded by: Daniel Webster Marsh

Personal details
- Born: August 15, 1853 England
- Died: February 1, 1937 (aged 83) Vancouver, British Columbia

Arthur Edwin Shelton (August 15, 1853 – February 1, 1937) was the third mayor of the town of Calgary, Alberta.

Shelton came to Calgary around 1884 running a furniture business on Stephen Avenue. He served as town councillor during the mayoral tenure of George Clift King from 1886 to 1888. Shelton was elected mayor in the 1888 election and served from January 16, 1888, to January 21, 1889. During his term, the Langevin Bridge was completed and the city begun construction of the waterworks system.

After his mayoral term, he returned to operate his furniture business. However, his name disappears from city directories in 1890.

Shelton's name appears in various corporate and government records in Vancouver, British Columbia, between 1892 and 1936. He died on February 1, 1937.

Preceded by George Clift King	Mayor of Calgary; 1888–1889	Succeeded by Daniel Webster Marsh
