= I. G. Baker Company =

The I. G. Baker Company was a mercantile and grocery company based in Fort Benton, Montana, started by Isaac Gilbert Baker and his brother, George Amos Baker, as I. G. Baker & Brother in 1866. After the Conrad brothers (Charles E. & Wm. G.) were admitted as partners in 1873, the company name was changed to I. G. Baker & Co., which name was retained after the Conrads purchased George Baker's interest in 1874. In 1891, the Canadian assets of the company were purchased by its chief rival there, the Hudson's Bay Company.

The company was prominent in early Western Canadian history. It operated the first store established in Calgary, Alberta in 1875. There were also stores in Fort Macleod and Lethbridge, Alberta and in Fort Walsh, Saskatchewan.

The I. G. Baker Company brought a herd of cattle from Montana to southern Alberta, the first livestock imported for what is now a significant industry in Alberta.
