= James Reilly (Canadian politician) =

Canadian politician (1835–1909)

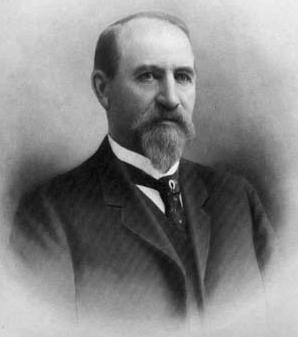

6th Mayor of Calgary
- In office January 19, 1891 – January 18, 1892
- Preceded by: James Delamere Lafferty
- Succeeded by: Alexander Lucas
- In office January 3, 1899 – January 2, 1900
- Preceded by: Arthur Leslie Cameron
- Succeeded by: William Henry Cushing

Calgary City Council Councillor
- In office January 20, 1890 – January 19, 1891
- In office January 18, 1892 – January 16, 1893

Personal details
- Born: March 28, 1835 Napierville, Lower Canada
- Died: July 9, 1909 (aged 74) Victoria, British Columbia, Canada

James Reilly (March 28, 1835 – July 9, 1909) was a Canadian businessman and politician. He was the sixth mayor of Calgary, Alberta.

== Early life ==
Reilly was born in 1835 in Napierville, Quebec, to immigrant parents from Ireland. In Quebec he became an architect and builder before going to Winnipeg, Manitoba, in 1882, then to Calgary in 1883. In Calgary he became actively involved with the local community. He played a key part in organizing a citizens group concerned about the location of the railway station that was built in Calgary. While proprietor of the Royal Hotel, he organized the first civic committee meeting on January 4, 1884. This was the first step leading to Calgary's municipal incorporation later that year.

== Political life ==
Reilly continually sought opportunities for political positions throughout his time in Calgary, although only succeeding at the local level as councillor and mayor for Calgary.

Reilly ran for mayor in Calgary's second municipal election in January 1886, and lost the popular vote to incumbent George Murdoch. Stipendiary magistrate Jeremiah Travis overturned the result of the January 1886 election on weak charges of corruption by Murdoch, and appointed Reilly the mayor of Calgary. Murdoch would not accept Travis' order and both parties attempted to govern the town, leading to dysfunction and the absence of local government until the federal government reorganized the Northwest Territories governance, suspended Travis and a new election was organized for November 1886. Neither Reilly or Murdoch would contest the November 1886 election. The City of Calgary recognizes Murdoch as the elected mayor in January 1886.

Reilly would later be elected town councillor in 1890, and subsequently be elected Calgary's sixth mayor in 1891. Reilly served one term as mayor, and was again elected as a councillor in 1892. After serving one term as councillor, Reilly would remain out of municipal politics until second election as mayor in 1898.

=== Territorial election attempts ===
Reilly would contest several Northwest Territory general elections, including the 1894, 1898 and 1902 Northwest Territories general election in the constituency of East Calgary. Reilly would never garner more than 22 per cent of the vote, or finish better than third.

=== Federal election attempt ===
James Reilly would contest the 1891 Canadian federal election for the Alberta (Provisional District), losing by a considerable margin to Donald Watson Davis. In an advertisement in the February 28, 1891 Edmonton Bulletin, Reilly would explain his platform which was primarily focused on having Alberta become a province in Confederation. Reilly would also support greater trade through railways with the United States, local options for liquor prohibition, greater commercial development in Banff, Alberta, removal of the Sarcee people for urban expansion, and supported the claims of Métis people for recognition from the government. While it is noted by historians that Reilly was a member of the Liberal Party of Canada, and he was supported in his election by future Liberal Member of Parliament Frank Oliver, Reilly noted in an advertisement in the Edmonton Bulletin that he is "a Conservative and supporter of that policy of Sir John A. Macdonald that has built up the financial credit of Canada...".

== Later life ==
In October 1899, Reilly left Calgary and traveled extensively. He retired in Victoria, British Columbia, where he died on July 9, 1909, from influenza. His death came as a shock to many, as his condition had been seemingly improving. He was later interred in Calgary. After his death, it was said that "to write the life of the late James Reilly is to rewrite the history of Calgary." Reilly was married to May Watts.

== Sources ==
- Frederick Hunter: THE MAYORS AND COUNCILS OF THE CORPORATION OF CALGARY Archived March 3, 2020
