= Jeremiah Travis =

Canadian politician (1830–1911)

Member of the 1st Council of the Northwest Territories

Stipendiary Magistrate at the Town of Calgary

Personal details
- Born: January 21, 1830 Saint John, New Brunswick
- Died: April 27, 1911 (aged 81) Calgary, Alberta
- Education: Harvard University

Jeremiah Travis (January 21, 1830 – April 27, 1911) was a Canadian politician and attorney. He was a member of the 1st Council of the Northwest Territories in the 1880s, serving as stipendiary magistrate. He was an attorney and judge. Travis was born at Indiantown, a neighbourhood of present-day Saint John, New Brunswick. Travis graduated from Harvard University in 1866, and was awarded the law school's foremost prize for dissertations.

== Stipendiary Magistrate at the Town of Calgary ==
Travis, a teetotaler and supporter of the temperance movement, was a controversial figure in Calgary after his appointment as stipendiary magistrate of the Northwest Territories at the Town of Calgary on July 30, 1885.

Travis was appalled by the open traffic of liquor, gambling and prostitution in Calgary despite legal prohibition in the Northwest Territories. There were several clashes between Travis and Mayor George Murdoch and other town councillors. This culminated in the arrest and imprisonment of councillor Simon John Clarke to six month of hard labour, dismissal and imprisonment of Clerk of District Court Hugh Cayley, overturning the results of the January 1886 Calgary municipal election, removing Mayor Murdoch, barring him from contesting an election for two years and the appointment of a separate municipal council.

Travis was subsequently placed on paid leave while Justice Thomas Wardlaw Taylor was appointed by the federal government to investigate the situation. Justice Taylor's final report concluded "...considering the excited state of public feeling, and the attitude of hostility in which Mr. Travis and a large number of inhabitants of Calgary and neighbourhood stand to one another, and for which both parties are blameable, I can express no other opinion, than that the Government ought not to continue Mr. Travis in the office of Stipendiary Magistrate at the Town of Calgary."

Jeremiah Travis was suspended and the government waited for his official tenure to expire, after which he was pensioned off.

== Later life ==
Travis died in Calgary on April 27, 1911.

== Works ==
- Travis, Jeremiah (1866–67). The extent to which the common law is applied in determining what constitutes a crime, and the nature and degree of punishment consequent thereupon. American Law Reg. (Philadelphia), new ser., 6 (1866–67): 65–79, 129–46, 321–41.
- Travis, Jeremiah (1884). A law Treatise on the Constitutional Powers of Parliament, and of the Local Legislatures, Under the British North America Act, 1867. Saint John. ASIN:B0067ROSSK
- Travis, Jeremiah (1892). Commentaries on the Law of Sales and Collateral Subjects (Volume 1). Boston and Toronto
- Travis, Jeremiah (1892). Commentaries on the law of Sales and Collateral Subjects (Volume 2). Boston and Toronto
