= James Delamere Lafferty =

Canadian politician

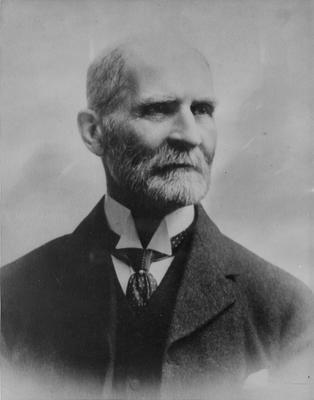

5th Mayor of Calgary
- In office January 20, 1890 – January 19, 1891
- Preceded by: Daniel Webster Marsh
- Succeeded by: James Reilly

Personal details
- Born: April 28, 1849 Perth, Canada West
- Died: July 29, 1920 (aged 71) Calgary, Alberta, Canada
- Spouse: Jessie Patricia Gray Lafferty (1850–1918)
- Children: Francis Delamere Lafferty (1876–1919); Guy Alexander Lafferty (1879–1934); Geoffrey Grant Lafferty (1882–1953) Heber Pembroke Lafferty<military records>
- Parent(s): James Lafferty (1824–1881) and Elizabeth Brown Lafferty (1829–1901)

James Delamere Lafferty (April 28, 1849 – July 29, 1920) was a Canadian physician and politician. Lafferty served as Registrar for the Northwest Territories Medical Ordinance regulator to professionalize the practice of medicine. He was actively involved in establishing the College of Physicians and Surgeons of Alberta and the Canadian Medical Association's Alberta Division, which was later known as the Alberta Medical Association. He served one term as the fifth mayor of Calgary from January 1890 to January 1891.

== Early life ==
Lafferty was born in Perth, Canada West, in 1849 and attended local schools. He had seven brothers and four sisters. Three of his brothers became physicians, and his brother Tom became a lawyer and moved to Calgary, Alberta.

== Education ==
He worked as deputy registrar of titles in Kingston to finance his further education. He graduated from Queen's University medical school in 1871. Lafferty practised medicine for a year in Perth before becoming a senior resident at Ward Island hospital (later Bellevue Hospital) in New York City and at the New York Eye and Ear Infirmary. Lafferty next took a post-graduate course at St Bartholomew's Hospital in London, England.

== Medical career ==
In 1873, he set up practice in Pembroke, Ontario; later that same year, he married Jessie P. Grant. From 1877 to 1880, Lafferty also operated a drug store in Pembroke. In 1880, he was named associate coroner for Renfrew County. The following year, Lafferty was offered the position of chief surgeon for the eastern division of the Canadian Pacific Railway (CPR) and moved to Winnipeg, Manitoba, later that year. Lafferty and his family had moved to Regina, Saskatchewan, by 1885 and then moved on to Calgary in December 1885.

In Calgary, Lafferty took on the contracts to provide medical services for the CPR mainline and for the nearby Indian reservation.

In 1889, he was a founding member of the North West Territories Medical Association and, in the following year, was elected to the medical council for the College of Physicians and Surgeons of the North West Territories.

Lafferty served as NWT Medical Ordinance regulator, which included the geographic regions that became the provinces of Alberta and Saskatchewan.

When Alberta became a province of the Dominion of Canada, with the passage of the July 20, 1905, Alberta Act in the Canadian parliament, all existing societies or associations that regulated the medical profession, dentistry, pharmaceutical chemistry and others, under the Northwest Territories (NWT) Medical Ordinance, were dissolved. A new entity was formed with the passage of the May 9, 1906 Alberta Medical Profession Act, in the newly formed Alberta provincial legislature. Lafferty, who had drafted the medical acts for both newly formed provinces—Alberta and Saskatchewan, organized the 1906 meeting which formed the Alberta Medical Association. Later that same year, he organized the first meeting of the Alberta College of Physicians and Surgeons. Lafferty served as Registrar-Treasurer for the college until 1911. From 1907 to 1910, he served as chair of the Provincial Board of Health. He also served as first president of the Calgary Medical Society. Lafferty retired from the practice of medicine in 1909 but served as a hospital inspector from 1909 until 1918 (or possibly later).

== Banking career ==
Lafferty was also involved in the operation of a chain of private banks in western Canada known as the Lafferty and Smith Banks in partnership with Frederick G. Smith. He left that partnership in 1889 and formed the Lafferty and Moore Bank. In 1893, Lafferty and Moore was acquired by the Bank of Montreal.

== Political career in federal politics ==
Lafferty ran for the Liberal Party in the provisional district of Alberta in the 1887 Canadian federal election, but lost out to Conservative Donald Watson Davis.

== Personal life ==
Three of Lafferty's brothers became physicians, and his brother Tom became a lawyer and moved to Calgary, Alberta. His brother Alan Marshall Lafferty (1861–1947) was a medical practitioner in Lethbridge, Alberta. His sister Janet Lafferty Short (1847–1934) married the lawyer, James Short of Calgary.

Lafferty died on July 29, 1920, in Calgary, aged 71. His July 20, 1920, obituary in the Calgary Albertan, described him as an "ebullient, effervescent, entertaining pro westerner [he was] a shrewd judge of character with great drive and persuasion." He was survived by his three of four sons, Guy, Geoffrey, and Heber and by his two sisters. His son Francis (Frank) predeceased him in 1919.

== Bibliography ==
- Mitchell, Ethel (1975). Past and present : people, places and events in Calgary : accounts. Vol. James Lafferty, M.D., Mayor 1890. Calgary, Alberta: Century Calgary Publications.

| Preceded by Daniel Webster Marsh | Mayor of Calgary; 1890–1891 | Succeeded by James Reilly |
