= Thomas Wardlaw Taylor =

Canadian lawyer and judge (1833–1917)

Sir Thomas Wardlaw Taylor

Chief Justice, Court of Queen's Bench of Manitoba
- In office 1887–1899
- Preceded by: Lewis Wallbridge
- Succeeded by: Albert Clements Killam

Personal details
- Born: March 25, 1833 Auchtermuchty, Scotland
- Died: March 2, 1917 (aged 83) Hamilton, Ontario, Canada
- Education: University of Edinburgh

Sir Thomas Wardlaw Taylor (March 25, 1833 – March 2, 1917) was a Canadian lawyer and judge.

Born in Auchtermuchty, Scotland, he studied at Edinburgh University, and was admitted to the Law Society of Upper Canada in 1858. From 1872 to 1883 he was Master of Chancery, in the Ontario Court of Chancery.

In 1883 he was appointed a puisne judge of the Manitoba Court of Queen's Bench, a position he held until appointment as Chief Justice of Manitoba in 1887. He was one of the members of the Court who sat on the appeal by Métis leader Louis Riel from his conviction of high treason following the North-West Rebellion in 1885. The court dismissed Riel's appeal, which was upheld by the Judicial Committee of the Privy Council, at that time the highest court of appeal in the British Empire.

Taylor was Chief Justice of Manitoba from 1887 to 1899, and in 1890 and 1893 was administrator of the provincial government. He made an extensive study of equity jurisprudence, on which subject he published a volume of Commentaries (1875). He was the author of Chancery Statutes and Orders and The Public Statutes Relating to the Presbyterian Church, and more.

He was knighted in the 1897 Diamond Jubilee Honours.

He is commemorated by Wardlaw Avenue in Winnipeg.
