= List of mayors of Calgary =

Mayor of Calgary
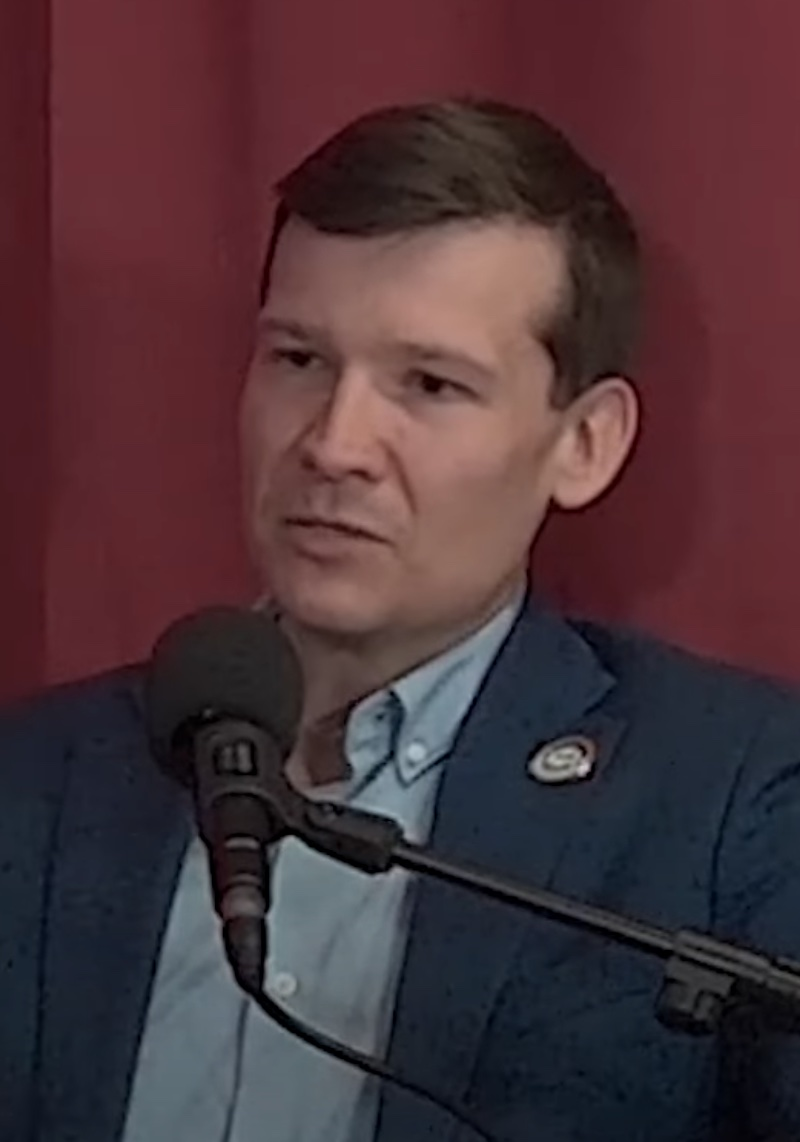
- Incumbent; Jeromy Farkas since October 29, 2025
- Style: His Worship; Mayor (informal)
- Member of: City Council
- Reports to: Calgary City Council
- Residence: Calgary, Alberta
- Seat: Calgary Municipal Building
- Appointer: Direct election by residents of Calgary
- Term length: Four years, renewable
- Formation: December 4, 1884; 141 years ago
- First holder: George Murdoch
- Salary: $191,589 (2011)
- Website: Mayor's office

The mayor of Calgary is the chief executive and head of the Calgary City Council, the municipal government of the city of Calgary, Alberta, Canada. While in office, mayors are styled His/Her Worship.

The mayor is directly elected by all eligible residents across the city of Calgary. Until 1961, the mayor was elected using Instant-runoff voting, with the current system being first-past-the-post voting.

Mayors were elected annually from 1884 to 1923. Following a 1923 referendum, the mayor's term was extended to 2 years. Following the passage of the Municipal Government Act, the mayor's term was further extended to 3 years. The current 4-year mayoral term was adopted in 2013. In the event of a vacancy in the office, a new mayor is appointed by the City Council until the next election; this occurred after the resignations of Harry Hays and Ralph Klein.

The 38th and current mayor is Jeromy Farkas, who assumed office on October 29, 2025. Farkas was elected in the 2025 Calgary municipal election and is serving his first term in office.

== List of mayors of Calgary ==
Mayors of Calgary
	Mayor	Term began	Term ended	Time in office
1	George Murdoch (Note: Northwest Territorial Ordinance 1-1886 voided the results of the January 1886 Calgary municipal election and stated no Council existed in Calgary which would have been the period between January 18, 1886 and October 21, 1886.)	December 4, 1884	October 21, 1886	1 year, 321 days
2	George Clift King	November 4, 1886	January 16, 1888	1 year, 63 days
3	Arthur Edwin Shelton	January 16, 1888	January 21, 1889	1 year, 5 days
4	Daniel Webster Marsh	January 21, 1889	January 20, 1890	364 days
5	James Delamere Lafferty	January 20, 1890	January 19, 1891	364 days
6	James Reilly	January 19, 1891	January 18, 1892	364 days
7	Alexander Lucas	January 18, 1892	January 2, 1894	1 year, 349 days
8	Wesley Fletcher Orr	January 16, 1894	January 6, 1896	1 year, 355 days
9	Alexander McBride	January 6, 1896	January 4, 1897	364 days
8	Wesley Fletcher Orr (2nd time)	January 4, 1897	January 3, 1898	364 days
10	Arthur Leslie Cameron	January 3, 1898	January 3, 1899	1 year, 0 days
6	James Reilly (2nd time)	January 3, 1899	January 2, 1900	364 days
11	William Henry Cushing	January 2, 1900	January 7, 1901	1 year, 5 days
12	James Stuart Mackie	January 7, 1901	January 6, 1902	364 days
13	Thomas Underwood	January 6, 1902	January 5, 1904	1 year, 364 days
14	Silas Alexander Ramsay	January 5, 1904	January 2, 1905	363 days
15	John Emerson	January 2, 1905	January 14, 1907	2 years, 12 days
10	Arthur Leslie Cameron (2nd time)	January 14, 1907	January 2, 1909	1 year, 354 days
16	Reuben Rupert Jamieson	January 2, 1909	January 2, 1911	2 years, 0 days
17	John William Mitchell	January 2, 1911	January 2, 1913	2 years, 0 days
18	Herbert Arthur Sinnott	January 2, 1913	January 2, 1915	2 years, 0 days
19	Michael Copps Costello	January 2, 1915	January 2, 1919	4 years, 0 days
20	Robert Colin Marshall	January 2, 1919	January 3, 1921	2 years, 1 day
21	Samuel Hunter Adams	January 3, 1921	January 2, 1923	1 year, 364 days
22	George Harry Webster	January 2, 1923	December 31, 1926	3 years, 363 days
23	Frederick Ernest Osborne	January 3, 1927	December 31, 1929	2 years, 0 days
24	Andrew Davison	January 1, 1930	December 31, 1945	15 years, 0 days
25	James Cameron Watson	January 1, 1946	December 31, 1949	4 years, 364 days
26	Don Mackay	January 1, 1950	October 19, 1959	9 years, 291 days
27	Harry Hays (Note: Harry Hays resigned effective June 30, 1963, Grant MacEwan appointed as Mayor by Council and sworn in July 3, 1963.)	October 19, 1959	June 30, 1963	3 years, 254 days
28	Grant MacEwan	July 4, 1963	October 18, 1965	2 years, 106 days
29	Jack Leslie	October 18, 1965	October 22, 1969	4 years, 4 days
30	Rod Sykes	October 22, 1969	October 31, 1977	8 years, 9 days
31	Ross Alger	October 31, 1977	October 27, 1980	2 years, 362 days
32	Ralph Klein (Note: Ralph Klein resigned March 21, 1989, Donald Hartman appointed as mayor by Council on same day.)	October 27, 1980	March 21, 1989	8 years, 145 days
33	Don Hartman	March 21, 1989	October 23, 1989	216 days
34	Al Duerr	October 23, 1989	October 22, 2001	11 years, 364 days
35	Dave Bronconnier	October 22, 2001	October 25, 2010	9 years, 3 days
36	Naheed Nenshi	October 25, 2010	October 26, 2021	11 years, 1 day
37	Jyoti Gondek	October 26, 2021	October 29, 2025	4 years, 3 days
38	Jeromy Farkas	October 29, 2025	Present	313 days (as of September 7, 2026)

== See also ==
- List of Calgary municipal elections
- Calgary City Council

== Sources ==
- Biographies of Calgary's mayors from the City of Calgary web page
- A brief history of Calgary's City Council
