= 2004 Edmonton municipal election =

Municipal election in Alberta, Canada

← 2001	October 18, 2004	2007 →

Mayor and 12 councilors to Edmonton City Council
- Turnout: 41.79% (▲6.56 pp)
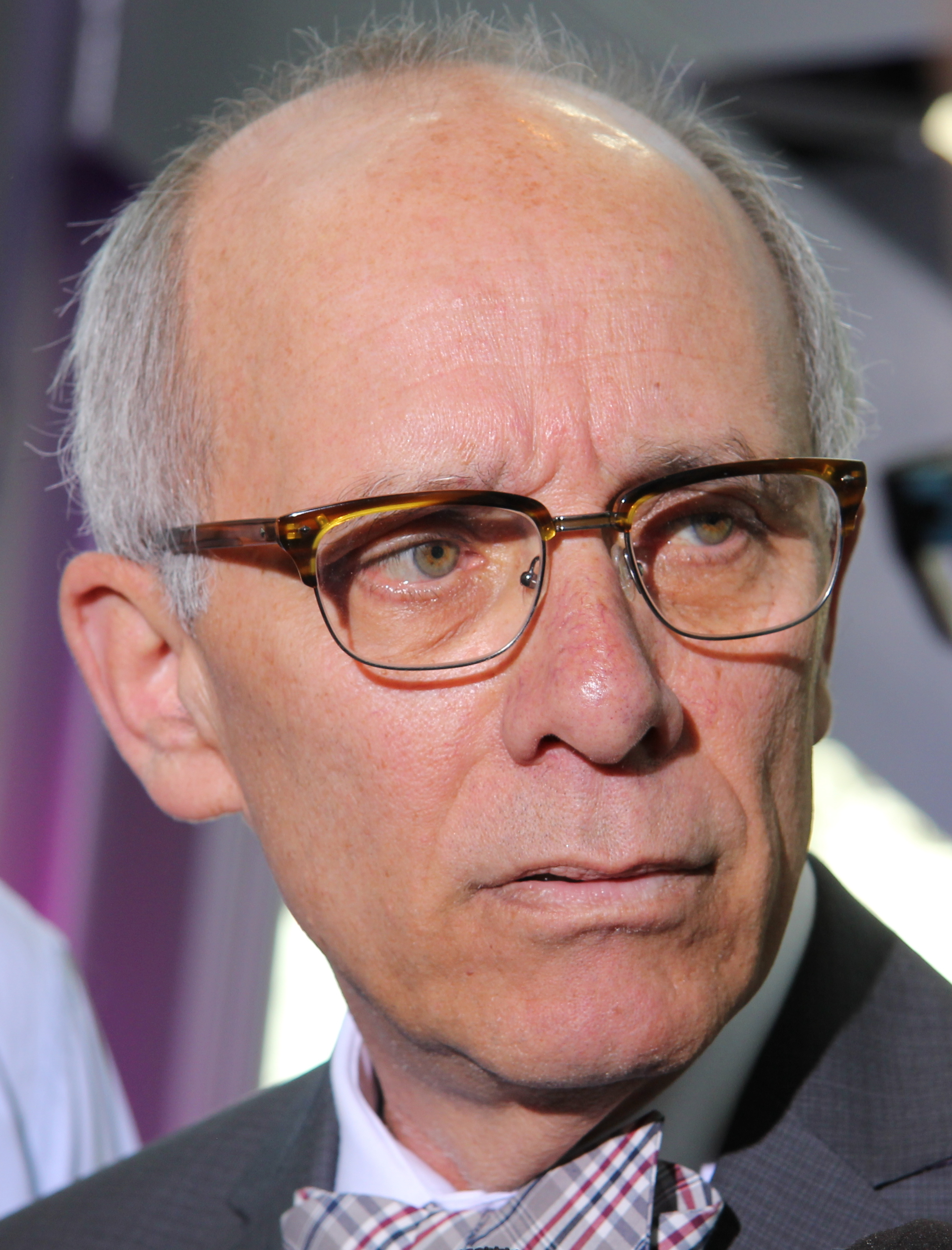

Candidate	Stephen Mandel	Bill Smith	Robert Noce
Popular vote	85,887	68,767	52,640
Percentage	40.68%	32.57%	24.93%
Mayor before election
Bill Smith
Elected mayor
Stephen Mandel

The 2004 Edmonton municipal election was held on October 18, 2004 to elect a mayor and twelve councillors to sit on Edmonton City Council, nine trustees to sit on the public school board, and seven trustees to sit on the separate school board.

There were 212,105 ballots cast out of 507,577 eligible voters, for a voter turnout of 41.8%.

== Results ==
(bold indicates elected, italics indicate incumbent)

=== Mayor ===
Candidate	Votes	%
**Stephen Mandel**	**85,887**	**40.68%**
Bill Smith	68,767	32.57%
Robert Noce	52,640	24.93%
Tilo Paravalos	921	0.44%
Dieter Peske	905	0.43%
Dave Dowling	858	0.41%
Thomas "Buffalo Terminator" Tomilson	768	0.36%
Jean-Paul Noujaim	390	0.18%

=== Councillors ===
Twelve councillors, two elected in each of six wards, with voters having up to two votes each.

Five women, seven men were elected as city councillors.

Ward 1		Ward 2		Ward 3		Ward 4		Ward 5		Ward 6	
Candidate	Votes	Candidate	Votes	Candidate	Votes	Candidate	Votes	Candidate	Votes	Candidate	Votes
**Karen Leibovici**	**23,793**	**Ron Hayter**	**18,386**	**Janice Melnychuk**	**21,020**	**Michael Phair**	**23,219**	**Bryan Anderson**	**19,650**	**Dave Thiele**	**16,128**
**Linda Sloan**	**12,353**	**Kim Krushell**	**12,966**	**Ed Gibbons**	**17,524**	**Jane Batty**	**14,352**	**Mike Nickel**	**16,803**	**Terry Cavanagh**	**14,725**
Karen Lynch	10,909	Dave Loken	7,512	Tony Caterina	9,416	Ben Henderson	12,475	Donna Finucane	15,123	Chinwe Okelu	12,877
Charlene Davis	6,888	Don Koziak	7,289	Joan Duiker	5,978	Debbie Yeung	10,500	Al Slemko	6,576	Amarjeet Sohi	8,077
Terry Demers	3,306	Tim Hajar	4,542	Kyle Balombin	3,334	Thomas Roberts	1,945	Ian Crawford	5,307	Barbara Ann Thompson	6,339
Joe Hudson	3,046	Mimi Williams	3,978			Dale Ferris	1,702	Jung-Suk Ryu	3,817	Terry McKinnon	2,908
Samir Ghossein	1,534	Kerry Hutton	1,820			Paul Welke	1,417	Katie Oppen	2,029	Sean Diakiw	1,013
Rory Koopmans	1,332	Larry Thomson	1,629					Adil Pirbhai	533		
Trent Soholt	1,149	Jabin Caouette	1,526								

=== Public school trustees ===
Ward A			Ward B			Ward C		
**Bev Esslinger**	**9,702**	**70.53%**	**Wendy Keiver**	**6,511**	**51.28%**	**Don Williams**	**5,929**	**38.45%**
Perry Chahal	2,486	18.07%	Bob Dean	6,187	48.72%	Sherry Adams	5,719	37.09%
Victor Varvis	1,567	11.39%				Phill McNabb	3,773	24.47%
Ward D			Ward E			Ward F		
**David Colburn**	**5,011**	**44.92%**	**Ken Gibson**	**Acclaimed**		**Don Fleming**	**8,767**	**57.02%**
Terry Sulyma	4,017	36.01%				Susan O'Neil	6,608	42.98%
Emil van der Poorten	2,127	19.07%						
Ward G			Ward H			Ward I		
**Svend Hansen**	**12,202**	**66.25%**	**George Nicholson**	**9,868**	**50.41%**	**Gerry Gibeault**	**6,296**	**44.17%**
Kam Gill	6,217	33.75%	Catherine Ripley	9,706	49.59%	Judith Axelson	6,020	42.23%
						Neal Gray	1,939	13.60%

=== Separate (Catholic) school trustees ===
One trustee is elected from each ward, and the non-victorious candidate with the most total votes is also elected.

Ward 1			Ward 2			Ward 3		
**Debbie Engel**	**Acclaimed**		**Janice Sarich**	**8,084**	**65.09%**	**Mark Razzolini**	**7,786**	**69.08%**
			**Jim Urlacher**	**4,336**	**34.91%**	John Beke	3,485	30.92%
Ward 4			Ward 5			Ward 6		
**Debbie Cavaliere**	**4,699**	**57.12%**	**Judy Buddle**	**3,336**	**40.23%**	**Patrick McDonald**	**3,803**	**46.17%**
Joe Filewych	2,329	28.31%	Marilyn Bergstra	3,313	39.95%	Kara Pelech	2,840	34.48%
Rudy Arcilla	1,199	14.57%	Doug McCarthy	1,643	19.81%	Jim Shinkaruk	1,594	19.35%
