= 2007 Edmonton municipal election =

Municipal election in Alberta, Canada

- October 15, 2007

Mayor and 12 councilors to Edmonton City Council
- Turnout: 27.24% (▼14.55 pp)
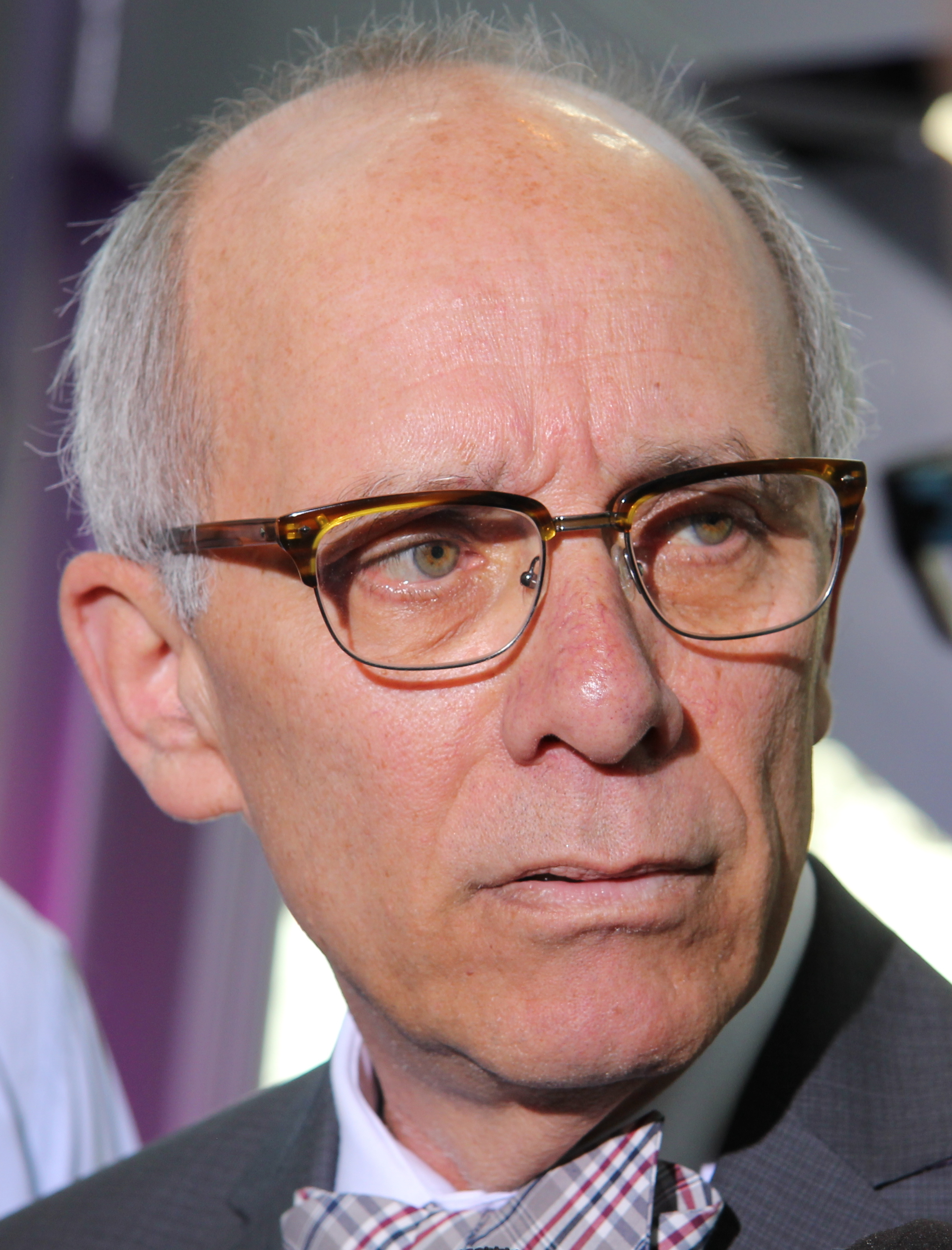

Candidate	Stephen Mandel	Don Koziak
Popular vote	98,751	38,027
Percentage	65.8%	25.3%
Mayor before election
Stephen Mandel
Elected mayor
Stephen Mandel

The 2007 Edmonton municipal election was held Monday, October 15, 2007, to elect a mayor and 12 councillors to the city council, eight of the nine trustees to Edmonton Public Schools, and four of the seven trustees to the Edmonton Catholic Schools. One incumbent public school trustee had no challengers, and three separate school trustee candidates (one being an incumbent) were unchallenged. Since 1968, provincial legislation has required every municipality to hold triennial elections. Of the estimated 560,117 eligible voters, only 152,576 turned in a ballot, a voter turnout of 27.2%.

This was the last Edmonton city election to be held with multiple members elected in a contest. On July 22, 2009, city council voted to change the electoral system of six wards electing two councillors each, to a system of 12 wards; each ward to be represented by a single councillor. The changes took effect for the 2010 election.

== Candidates ==
Bold indicates elected, italics indicates incumbent.

=== Mayor ===
Mayor
Candidate	Votes	%
**Stephen Mandel**	**98,751**	**65.80%**
Don Koziak	38,027	25.34%
Dave Dowling	2,690	1.79%
George Lam	2,647	1.76%
Dustin Becker	2,568	1.71%
Bill Whatcott	1,665	1.11%
Peter T. Lefaivre	1,413	0.94%
Robert (Bob) Ligertwood	1,235	0.82%
Khaled Kheireddine	1,089	0.73%

=== Councillors ===
Each voter could cast two votes. Plurality block voting was used to elect members.

Councillors
Ward 1			Ward 2			Ward 3		
Candidate	Votes	%	Candidate	Votes	%	Candidate	Votes	%
**Karen Leibovici**	**17,870**	**40.6%**	**Kim Krushell**	**12,762**	**31.8%**	**Ed Gibbons**	**11,278**	**28.9%**
**Linda Sloan**	**14,752**	**33.5%**	**Ron Hayter**	**11,073**	**27.6%**	**Tony Caterina**	**9,126**	**23.4%**
Andrew Knack	6,109	13.9%	Dave Loken	7,022	17.5%	Harvey Voogd	8,565	22.0%
Betty Kennedy	5,338	12.1%	Shelly Tupper	4,869	12.1%	Chris Martin	3,699	9.5%
Ward 4			Kerry Hutton	2,262	5.6%	Kyle Balombin	3,207	8.2%
**Jane Batty**	**9,800**	**20.84**	Jabin Caouette	2,149	5.4%	Thomas J. Tomilson	1,524	3.9%
**Ben Henderson**	**9,092**	**19.34**				Shiu Wing Mak	1,116	2.9%
Lewis Cardinal	8,908	18.95				Chris Roehrs	457	1.2%
Debbie Yeung	7,669	16.31	Ward 5			Ward 6		
Sheila McKay	4,187	8.91	**Bryan K. Anderson**	**17,867**	**33.8%**	**Dave Thiele**	**11,716**	**23.4%**
Hana Razga	2,397	5.10	**Don Iveson**	**16,848**	**31.8%**	**Amarjeet Sohi**	**10,503**	**21.0%**
Brent Thompson	922	1.96	Mike Nickel	14,597	27.6%	Chinwe Okelu	10,250	20.5%
Brian E. Patterson	887	1.89	Brent Michalyk	3,610	6.8%	Chuck McKenna	9,222	18.4%
Nyambura Mia Belcourt	572	1.22				Lori G. Jeffrey-Heaney	7,136	14.2%
Thomas W. Roberts	514	1.09				Tomas Dennis Vasquez	1,281	2.6%
Deborah J. Peaker	472	1.00						
Adil Pirbhai	468	1.00						
Jodi Flatt	458	0.97						
Margaret Saunter	371	0.79						
Brian Wissinck	298	0.63						

=== Public school trustees ===
Edmonton Public Schools
Ward A			Ward B			Ward C		
**Bev Esslinger**	**Acclaimed**		**Ken Shipka**	**4,718**	**53.3%**	**Sue Huff**	**6,932**	**61.6%**
			Wendy Keiver	4,135	46.7%	Don Williams	4,314	38.4%
Ward D			Ward E			Ward F		
**Dave Colburn**	**3,795**	**50.94%**	**Ken Gibson**	**4,849**	**52.7%**	**Don Fleming**	**6,272**	**56.4%**
Amanda Beisiegel	3,655	49.06%	Neil MacDonald	4,360	47.3%	Susan O'Neil	4,851	43.6%
Ward G			Ward H			Ward I		
**George Rice**	**5,306**	**36.1%**	**Catherine Ripley**	**10,645**	**71.0%**	**Gerry Gibeault**	**5,729**	**50.25%**
Sheila Clifford-MacKay	3,765	25.6%	Neil Robblee	4,340	29.0%	Judith Axelson	5,673	49.75%
Marlene Spencer	2,759	18.8%						
Terry J. McKinnon	1,783	12.1%						
Myrna Freeman	1,070	7.3%						

=== Separate school trustees ===
One trustee is elected from each ward, and the non-victorious candidate with the most total votes is also elected.

Edmonton Catholic Schools
Ward 1			Ward 2			Ward 3		
Candidate	Votes	%	Candidate	Votes	%	Candidate	Votes	%
**Debbie Engel**	**Acclaimed**		**Jim Urlacher**	**3,352**	**39.7%**	**Cindy Olsen**	**4,176**	**58.0%**
			**Becky Kallal**	**2,704**	**32.0%**	Joe Filewych	1,950	27.1%
			Luigi Esposito	2,383	28.2%	Jim Shinkaruk	1,070	14.9%
Ward 4			Ward 5			Ward 6		
**Rudy Arcilla**	**Acclaimed**		**Marilyn Bergstra**	**4,244**	**63.0%**	**Kara Pelach**	**Acclaimed**	
			John Acheson	2,497	37.0%			

Jim Urlacher served as the trustee from Ward 2 until his death on May 16, 2009.

== Reaction ==
=== Mayoral ===
Incumbent Stephen Mandel won an absolute majority of the votes for mayor, far ahead of the second candidate Don Koziak, however the lack of a close race left voter turnout very low, 27 percent. Observers saw it as an endorsement of Mandel's more ambitious attitude and free-spending ways compared to past mayors, as well as a mandate to push the province for more funding and neighbouring communities for great regional planning.

=== Council ===
==== Ward 4 ====
Ben Henderson just managed to fend off Lewis Cardinal by 184 to fill the vacant seat.

==== Ward 5 ====
Ward 5 provided the biggest surprise of the election as incumbent and former mayoral candidate Mike Nickel was upset by 28-year-old newcomer Don Iveson. Iveson received 2,000 more votes than Nickel. Nickel was the only incumbent not re-elected.

==== Ward 6 ====
This ward was exceptionally close with just 466 votes separating first and third place.

== Candidates summaries ==
(Italics indicate incumbent)

=== Mayor ===
- Dustin Becker - heavy equipment operator
- Dave Dowling - finished sixth in the 2004 mayor race
- Khaled Kheireddine
- Don Koziak - hotel owner
- George Lam - university graduate
- Peter T. Lefaivre
- Robert Ligertwood - business owner
- Stephen Mandel - incumbent
- Bill Whatcott - social conservative activist

=== Councillors ===
==== Ward 1 ====
- Betty Kennedy
- Andrew Knack - retail manager
- Karen Leibovici - incumbent
- Linda Sloan - incumbent

==== Ward 2 ====
- Jabin Caouette - finished ninth in the 2004 Ward 2 race
- Ron Hayter - incumbent
- Kerry Hutton - finished seventh in the 2004 Ward 2 race
- Kim Krushell - incumbent
- Dave Loken - finished third in the 2004 Ward 2 race
- Shelley Tupper - federal employee

==== Ward 3 ====
- Kyle Balombin - finished fifth in the 2004 Ward 3 race
- Tony Caterina - finished third in the 2004 Ward 3 race
- Ed Gibbons - incumbent
- Shiu Wing Mak - internet technician
- Chris Martin - CBC production assistant
- Chris Roehrs
- Thomas James Tomilson - finished seventh in the 2004 mayor race
- Harvey Voogd - political activist

==== Ward 4 ====
With the retirement of Michael Phair from Ward 4, at least one new face from Ward 4 would have a spot on Council.

- Jane Batty - incumbent
- Nyambura Mia Belcourt
- Lewis Cardinal
- Jodi Flatt
- Ben Henderson - theatre director
- Sheila McKay
- Brian Edward Patterson
- Deborah J. Peaker
- Adil Pirhabi - accountant
- Hana Razga
- Thomas Roberts - finished fifth in the 2004 Ward 4 race
- Margaret Saunter
- Brent Thompson
- Brian Wissink
- Debbie Yeung - finished fourth in the 2004 Ward 4 race

==== Ward 5 ====
- Bryan Anderson - incumbent
- Don Iveson - non-profit manager
- Brent Michalyk - carpenter, president of community league
- Mike Nickel - incumbent

==== Ward 6 ====
With the retirement of Terry Cavanagh from Ward 6, at least one new face from Ward 6 would have a spot on Council.

- Lori G. Jeffrey-Heaney - former councilor and then mayor of Val Quentin, Alberta
- Chuck McKenna - transit operator, independent consultant
- Chinwe Okelu - finished third in the 2004 Ward 6 race
- Amarjeet Sohi - transit operator
- Dave Thiele - incumbent
- Tomas Dennis Vasquez - program co-ordinator
