= 1998 Edmonton municipal election =

Municipal election in Alberta, Canada

← 1995	October 26, 1998	2001 →

Mayor and 12 councilors to Edmonton City Council
Mayor before election
Bill Smith
Elected mayor
Bill Smith

The 1998 Edmonton municipal election was held October 26, 1998, to elect a mayor and 12 councillors to sit on Edmonton City Council, 9 trustees to sit on the public school board, and 7 trustees to sit on the separate school board. Edmontonians also decided one plebiscite question and participated in the Senate election.

== Voter turnout ==
There were 172,215 ballots cast out of 482,763 eligible voters, for a voter turnout of 35.7%.

== Results ==
(bold indicates elected, italics indicate incumbent)

=== Mayor ===
Candidate	Votes	%
**Bill Smith**	**84,512**	**50.62%**
Mike Nickel	27,029	16.19%
Ihor Broda	22,280	13.35%
Tooker Gomberg	21,614	12.95%
Rory Nugent	3,869	2.32%
Cheryl Schumacher	3,740	2.24%
Kelly Morris	2,178	1.30%
Brian Gregg	1,726	1.03%

=== Councillors ===
Ward 1		Ward 2		Ward 3		Ward 4		Ward 5		Ward 6	
Candidate	Votes	Candidate	Votes	Candidate	Votes	Candidate	Votes	Candidate	Votes	Candidate	Votes
**Wendy Kinsella**	**18,731**	**Allan Bolstad**	**15,605**	**Brian Mason**	**19,311**	**Jim Taylor**	**20,357**	**Larry Langley**	**13,805**	**Terry Cavanagh**	**13,659**
**Leroy Chahley**	**18,589**	**Rose Rosenberger**	**11,141**	**Robert Noce**	**17,094**	**Michael Phair**	**19,708**	**Bryan Anderson**	**12,731**	**Dave Thiele**	**9,773**
Jane Standing	7,958	Don Koziak	7,875	Gordon Stamp	8,085	Douglas Meggison	5,191	Jane Batty	8,785	Chinwe Okelu	7,654
Jerry Voss	3,350	Mimi Williams	5,739	Thomas Tomilson	2,046	Lee Permann	4,893	Maurice Fritz	6,503	Sheila McKay	6,781
		Sergio Teixeira	1,783					Donna Finucane	6,369	Ziad Jaber	3,937
								Brenda Platzer	5,973	Frank Atkinson	2,823
								Adil Pirbhai	891	Greg Dagg	2,022
										Gordon McIntosh	1,927
										Anna Graham	1,306
										Marcel Fayant	228

=== Public school trustees ===
Ward A			Ward C			Ward E			Ward G			Ward H		
**Bill Bonko**	**4,867**	**48.31%**	**Don Williams**	**3,979**	**33.12%**	**Carole Anne Dean**	**4,944**	**48.22%**	**Svend Hansen**	**3,806**	**25.37%**	**George Nicholson**	**9,510**	**65.94%**
Bev Esslinger	3,325	33.00%	Mel Huizinga	3,312	27.57%	Dennis Freeman	3,569	34.81%	Donna Fong	3,299	21.99%	Kerry Brown	4,912	34.06%
Lynette Young	1,883	18.69%	Dorothy Reynolds	2,405	20.02%	Lise Watts	1,740	16.97%	Lori Hilibeck	2,418	16.12%			
			Dorothy Reynolds	2,405	20.02%				Larry Zbitnew	1,591	10.61%			
			John McDonald	1,259	10.48%				Anna Der	1,244	8.29%			
			Murray Clarke	1,060	8.82%				Jim Patrick	1,058	7.05%			
Ward B			Ward D			Ward F			Jason Burns	503	3.35%	Ward I		
**Janice Melnychuk**	**3,972**	**41.80%**	**Terry Sulyma**	**3,395**	**41.22%**	**Don Fleming**	**Acclaimed**		Ron Kuban	405	2.70%	**Gerry Gibeault**	**6,328**	**54.87%**
Loreen Kabanuk	1,661	17.48%	Vicki Stamp	3,128	37.98%				Lynn Lunde	372	2.48%	David Fletcher	5,205	45.13%
Doug Stamp	1,287	13.54%	Karl Kuss	1,713	21.13%				David Balcon	304	2.03%			
Andy Chichak	1,254	13.20%												
Denis Lapierre	716	7.53%												
Dwayne Jiry	613	6.45%												

=== Separate (Catholic) school trustees ===
Ward 1			Ward 2			Ward 3		
**Debbie Engel**	**2,357**	**34.07%**	**Ronald Zapisocki**	**3,655**	**42.47%**	**Jim Shinkaruk**	**2,477**	**30.18%**
David MacDougall	1,189	17.18%	Jim Urlacher	2,587	30.06%	Gerda Krug	2,217	27.01%
Don Mah	1,013	14.64%	Vincent Capri	2,365	27.48%	Helen Tymoczo	1,955	23.82%
John Patrick Day	1,011	14.61%				Gunda Murray	1,558	18.98%
Reg Kastelan	993	14.35%						
Don Marriott	198	2.86%						
Robert Gossain	158	2.28%						
Ward 4			Ward 5			Ward 6		
**Ron Patsula**	**2,772**	**43.78%**	**Judy Buddle**	**4,610**	**77.67%**	**Brian Mitchell**	**3,784**	**58.47%**
Debbie Cavaliere	2,033	32.11%	Raphael Watzke	1,325	22.33%	Barbara Ann Thompson	2,688	41.53%
Don Weideman	1,526	24.10%						

(Edward Wieclaw was acclaimed to the seat representing Vegreville on the board.)

=== Video Lottery Terminal Plebiscite ===
Are you in favour of Bylaw No. 1853 which says, "City Council requests the Government of Alberta through the Alberta Liquor and Gaming Commission to remove Video Lottery Terminals from the City of Edmonton?" Vote Yes or No.

	Votes	%
Yes	80,964	49.85%
**No**	**81,449**	**50.15%**

=== Senate Nominee Election ===
This was a province-wide election. Results below reflect only Edmonton vote totals; provincially, Ted Morton and Bert Brown were elected (see 1998 Alberta Senate nominee election for province-wide results).

Party	Candidate	Votes
Reform	**Bert Brown**	**56,456**
Reform	**Ted Morton**	**47,785**
Independent	Guy Desrosiers	36,472
Independent	Vance Gough	28,588
