= 2001 Edmonton municipal election =

Municipal election in Alberta, Canada

← 1998	October 15, 2001	2004 →

Mayor and 12 councilors to Edmonton City Council
Mayor before election
Bill Smith
Elected mayor
Bill Smith

The 2001 Edmonton municipal election was held on October 15, 2001 to elect a mayor and twelve councilors to sit on Edmonton City Council, nine trustees to sit on the public school board, seven trustees to sit on the separate school board, and seven members of the Capital Health Board of Directors.

This election was the first, and to date only, election in which directors were elected to the boards of Alberta's Regional Health Authorities. After this election, the provincial government returned to appointing all members of these boards directly.

== Voter turnout ==
There were 172,540 ballots cast out of 489,794 eligible voters, for a voter turnout of 35.2%.

== Results ==
(bold indicates elected, italics indicate incumbent)

=== Mayor ===
Candidate	Votes	%
**Bill Smith**	**75,678**	**44.35%**
Robert Noce	54,375	31.87%
Mike Nickel	33,776	19.80%
Joe Devaney	1,746	1.02%
Katie Oppen	1,545	0.91%
Tess Elsworthy	1,513	0.89%
Laura Duffy	869	0.51%
Thomas "Buffalo Terminator" Tomilson	745	0.44%
Bob Ligertwood	376	0.22%

=== Councillors ===
Ward 1		Ward 2		Ward 3		Ward 4		Ward 5		Ward 6	
Candidate	Votes	Candidate	Votes	Candidate	Votes	Candidate	Votes	Candidate	Votes	Candidate	Votes
**Karen Leibovici**	**17,947**	**Allan Bolstad**	**13,933**	**Janice Melnychuk**	**10,550**	**Michael Phair**	**16,054**	**Larry Langley**	**19,521**	**Dave Thiele**	**13,998**
**Stephen Mandel**	**7,569**	**Ron Hayter**	**12,154**	**Ed Gibbons**	**8,640**	**Jane Batty**	**8,780**	**Bryan Anderson**	**19,131**	**Terry Cavanagh**	**13,784**
Don Clarke	7,536	Mimi Williams	5,522	Ken Shipka	5,042	Debbie Yeung	5,837	Judith Brown	11,931	Chinwe Okelu	10,239
Kathy Kohut	3,545	Don Lawson	5,318	Gordon Stamp	4,987	David Starko	5,504			Bob Stenhouse	8,024
Jane Standing	3,470	Tim Gartner	2,478	Allan Jack	3,169	Myles Kitagawa	5,177			Dennis Trefiak	1,742
Joe Hudson	3,390	Neil Cameron	2,275	Daniel Bablitz	2,733	Ben Henderson	4,164				
Charlie Galan	2,836	Mike Melymick	1,602	Marie Renaud	2,455	Jeff Campbell	1,503				
Rob McGregor	1,931	Robert Burns	1,448	Ken Balkwill	2,445	Doug Meggison	1,204				
Gerald "Jed" Woodill	1,390	Bud Sarasin	509	Mitch Compri	2,265	Peter Rowe	1,029				
Larry Anderson	1,117			Ron Schuster	1,953	David Verhagen	964				
Rita John	912			Joseph (J. R.) Royer	1,323	Lee Permann	925				
Sean Tisdall	612			Wade Franko	1,310	Bob Whyte	874				
				Ron Gavreau	833	Hank Muirhead	802				
				Tom Phelan	470	Thomas Roberts	533				
				Dean Leffler	432	Allyn White	524				
						Adil Pirbhai	410				
						Richard Gendron	277				
						Alexander Riabou	229				

=== Public school trustees ===
Ward A			Ward B			Ward C		
**Bill Bonko**	**6,769**	**62.07%**	**Bob Dean**	**4,739**	**46.94%**	**Lynn Odynski**	**7,669**	**56.77%**
Bev Esslinger	4,136	37.93%	Doug Stamp	2,735	27.09%	Don Williams	5,839	43.23%
			Ed Vass	1,769	17.52%			
			Perry Chahal	852	8.44%			
Ward D			Ward E			Ward F		
**Ray Martin**	**6,604**	**66.27%**	**Jean Woodrow**	**5,610**	**49.09%**	**Don Fleming**	**7,700**	**63.94%**
Terry Sulyma	2,021	20.28%	Carol Anne Dean	4,040	35.35%	Janice Fleming	4,342	36.06%
Vicki Nelson-Stamp	1,341	13.46%	Dianne Williamson	1,779	15.57%			
Ward G			Ward H			Ward I		
**Svend Hansen**	**8,053**	**55.45%**	**George Nicholson**	**Acclaimed**		**Gerry Gibeault**	**4,221**	**36.47%**
Sophie Ares Pilon	2,318	15.96%				Judith Axelson	3,183	27.50%
Patrick Dwyre	2,173	14.96%				Les Mcfadyen	2,910	25.14%
Sean Whelan	1,978	13.62%				Gordon Hum	1,064	9.19%
						Al Jovine	195	1.68%

=== Separate (Catholic) school trustees ===
One trustee is elected from each ward, and the non-victorious candidate with the most total votes is also elected.

Ward 1			Ward 2			Ward 3		
**Debbie Engel**	**5,828**	**76.15%**	**Janice Sarich**	**3,827**	**40.44%**	**Mark Razzolini**	**6,216**	**70.17%**
Richard Mcnally	1,825	23.85%	**Ronald Zapisocki**	**3,225**	**34.08%**	Jim Shinkaruk	2,643	29.83%
			Jim Urlacher	2,411	25.48%			
Ward 4			Ward 5			Ward 6		
**Debbie Cavaliere**	**3,851**	**58.96%**	**Judy Buddle**	**Acclaimed**		**Charles Koester**	**Acclaimed**	
Joe Filewych	2,681	41.04%						

=== Capital Health Authority ===
Ward ED1			Ward ED3			Ward ED5			Ward ED6			Ward ED7		
**Olivia Butti**	**14,878**	**64.01%**	**Joan Duiker**	**12,837**	**64.70%**	**Ian Crawford**	**5,587**	**22.98%**	**Barbara Ann Thompson**	**10,719**	**57.80%**	**Sheila McKay**	**10,981**	**44.77%**
Tom Olenuk	8,366	35.99%	Clarence Dezwart	7,004	35.30%	Jim Matt	4,402	18.10%	Earl Shinfruk	4,090	22.06%	Robert Hyndman	4,983	20.32%
Ward ED2			Ward ED4			Maurice Fritze	4,299	17.68%	Bas Roopnarine	3,735	20.14%	David Alton	4,208	17.16%
**Molly Warring**	**6,056**	**32.50%**	**Brian Bechtel**	**8,808**	**46.55%**	Robert Kinasewich	4,007	16.48%				Peter White	1,652	6.74%
Marilyn Kammer	4,811	25.82%	Les Young	6,333	33.47%	Deborah Holm	3,563	14.65%				Robert Rogers	1,555	6.34%
Louis Sobolewski	4,700	25.23%	Harvey Voogd	3,781	19.98%	Allan Hunsperger	1,700	6.99%				Fernando Pardo	1,147	4.68%
Brad Cardinal	3,065	16.45%				Bob Ewart	759	3.12%						
