= 2013 Edmonton municipal election =

Municipal election in Canada

2013 Edmonton mayoral election
← 2010	October 21, 2013	2017 →
- Turnout: 34.5% (▲1.1 pp)
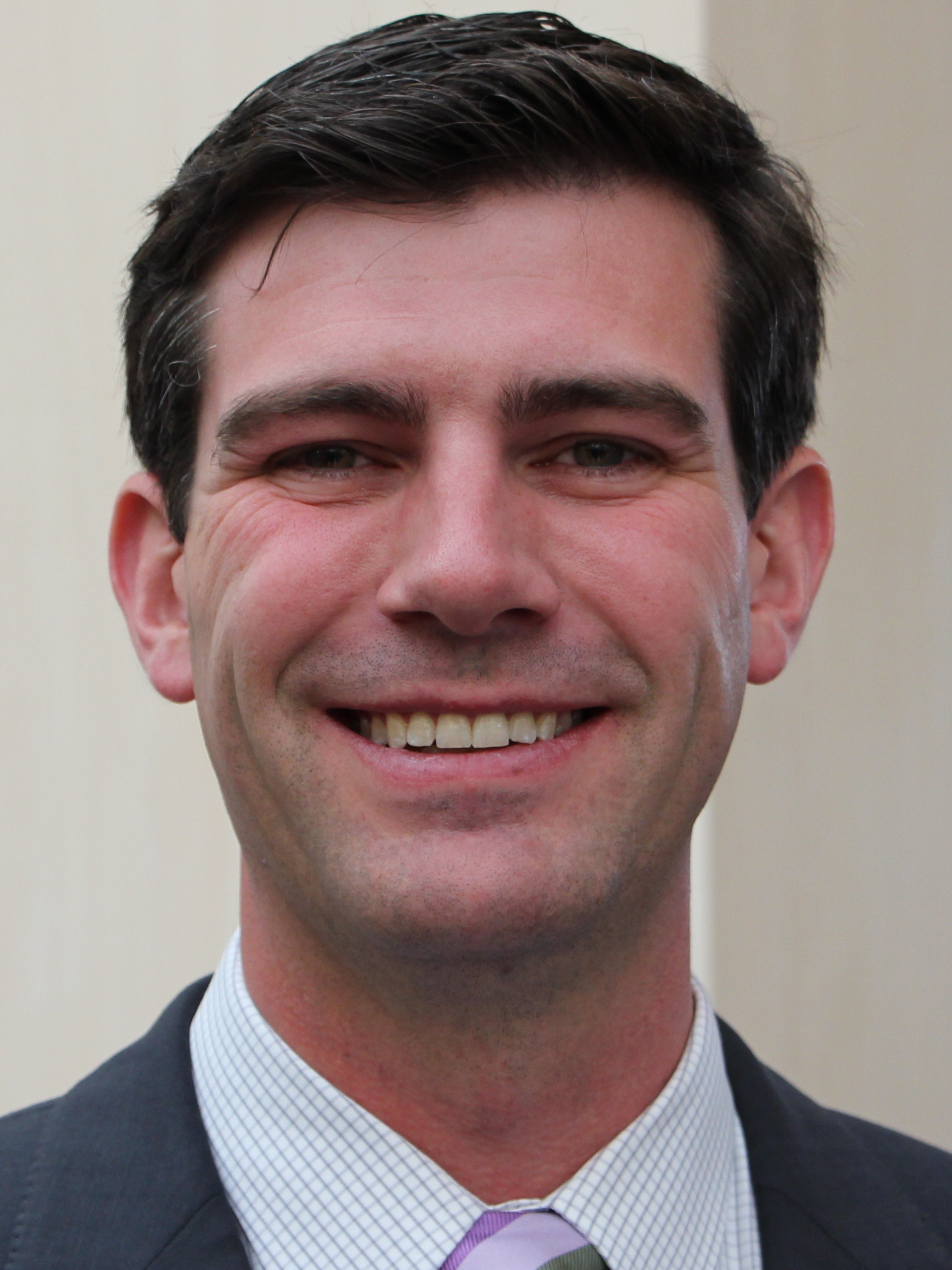

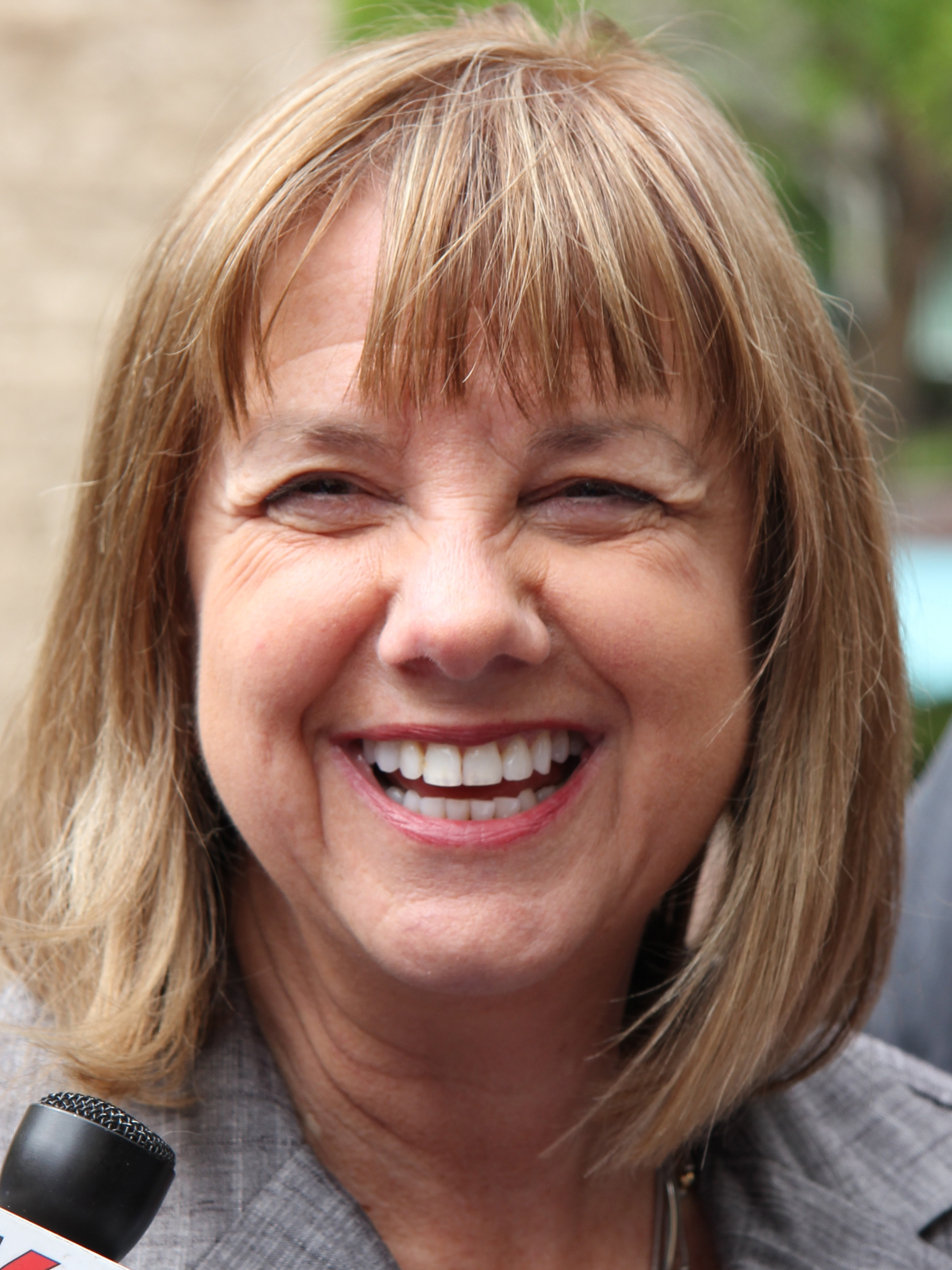

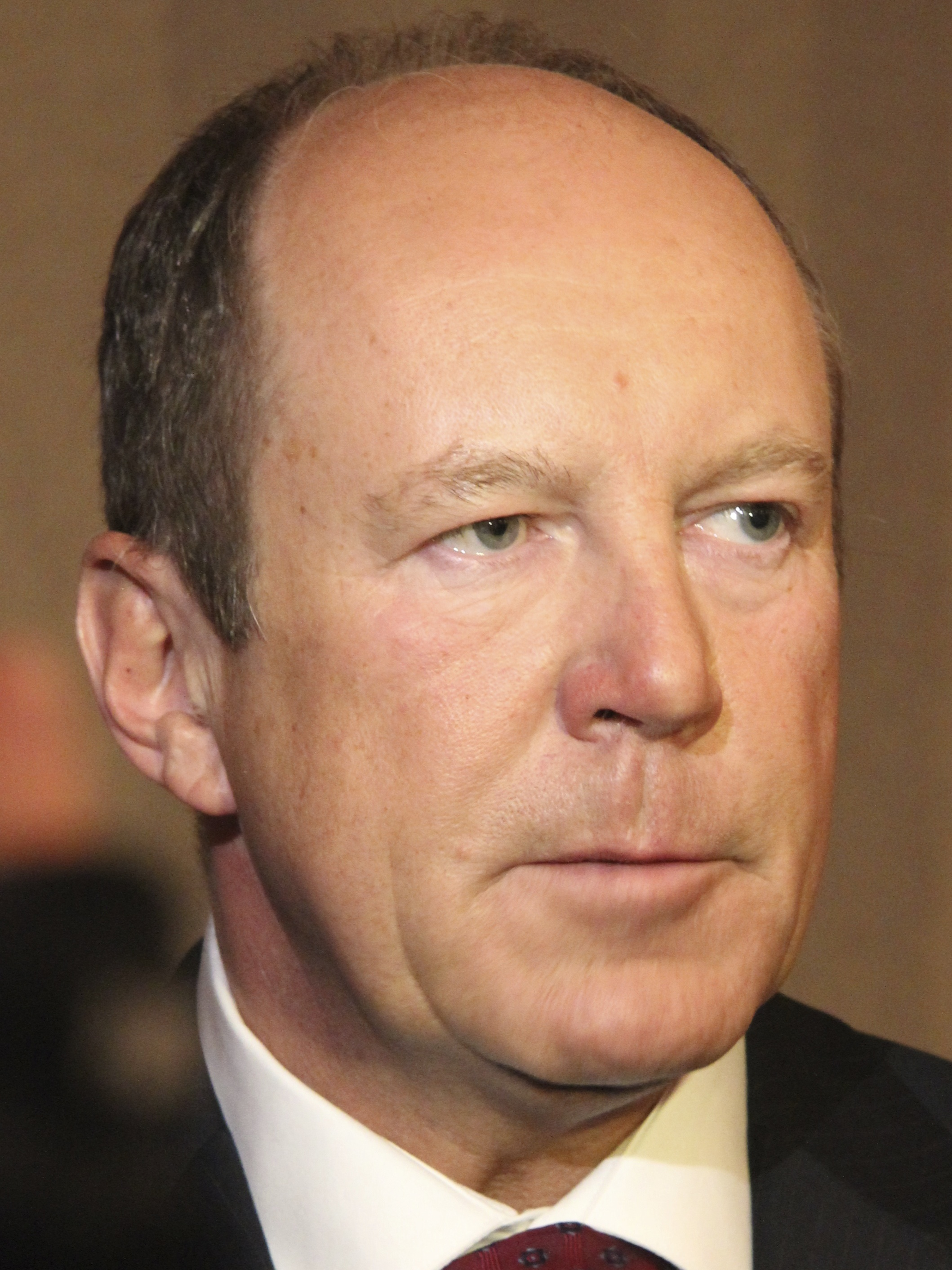
Candidate	Don Iveson	Karen Leibovici	Kerry Diotte
Popular vote	132,162	41,182	32,917
Percentage	62.22%	19.39%	15.50%
Mayor before election
Stephen Mandel
Elected mayor
Don Iveson

The 2013 Edmonton municipal election was held Monday, October 21, 2013 to elect a mayor and 12 councillors to the city council, seven of the nine trustees to Edmonton Public Schools, and the seven trustees to the Edmonton Catholic Schools. Two incumbent public school trustees had no challengers. From 1968 to 2013, provincial legislation has required every municipality to hold elections every three years. The Legislative Assembly of Alberta passed a bill on December 5, 2012, amending the Local Authorities Election Act. Starting with the 2013 elections, officials are elected for a four-year term, and municipal elections are moved to a four-year cycle.

The 12 electoral wards are the same as that of the 2010 election; each represented by a single councillor. Of the estimated 619,138 eligible voters, only 213,585 turned in a ballot, a voter turnout of 34.5%. A municipal census conducted in 2012 showed a population of 817,498, meaning approximately 75.7% of the population was eligible to vote. Three incumbent councillors retired from politics, Jane Batty, Kim Krushell, and Linda Sloan, while incumbent councillors Kerry Diotte, Don Iveson and Karen Leibovici ran for the position left by incumbent Mayor Stephen Mandel, guaranteeing at least six new councillors. The six vacancies were the only new councillors, as the remaining seven incumbents were re-elected. While the mayoral election was billed as a three-way race between the incumbent councillors, on election night Iveson won by a large margin.

== Candidates ==
Bold indicates elected, italics indicates incumbent.

=== Mayor ===
Mayor
Candidate	Votes	%
**Don Iveson**	**132,162**	**62.2**
Karen Leibovici	41,182	19.4
Kerry Diotte	32,917	15.5
Joshua Semotiuk	2,596	1.2
Gordon Ward	2,248	1.1
Kristine Acielo	1,292	0.6

- Kristine Acielo - sales with ACN Canada
- Kerry Diotte - incumbent ward 11 councillor
- Don Iveson - incumbent ward 10 councillor
- Karen Leibovici - incumbent ward 5 councillor, former MLA
- Josh Semotiuk - electrician
- Gordon Ward

=== Ward 1 ===
Ward 1
Candidate	Votes	%
**Andrew Knack**	**7,491**	**44.7**
Bryan Sandilands	3,374	20.1
Sharon Maclise	2,551	15.2
Sean Amato	1,674	10.0
Jamie Kenneth Post	1,016	6.1
Rob Pasay	665	4.0

- Sean Amato - television journalist
- Andrew Knack - community league president, finished second in the 2010 Ward 1 race
- Sharon Maclise
- Jamie Post - finished third in the 2010 Ward 1 race
- Bryan Sandilands - health economist

=== Ward 2 ===
Ward 2
Candidate	Votes	%
**Bev Esslinger**	**4,553**	**29.4**
Don Koziak	3,316	21.4
Nita Jalkanen	1,921	12.4
Ted Grand	1,684	10.9
Shelley Tupper	1,400	9.0
Mustafa Ali	1,355	8.7
Jason Millar	1,278	8.2

- Mustafa Ali
- Bev Esslinger - former public school chair
- Ted Grand - purchaser
- Nita Jalkanen
- Don Koziak - finished second in the 2010 Ward 2 race
- Jason Millar - trucking company manager
- Shelley Tupper - finished third in the 2010 Ward 2 race

=== Ward 3 ===
Ward 3
Candidate	Votes	%
**Dave Loken**	**6,564**	**45.2**
David Dodge	6,062	41.7
Rob Bernshaw	1,135	7.8
Hakin Isse	761	5.2

- Rob Bernshaw
- David Dodge - CKUA radio producer
- Hakin Isse - business owner
- Dave Loken - incumbent

=== Ward 4 ===
Ward 4
Candidate	Votes	%
**Ed Gibbons**	**10,752**	**77.2**
Sam Hachem	3,181	22.8

- Ed Gibbons - incumbent
- Sam Hachem - real estate agent

=== Ward 5 ===
Ward 5
Candidate	Votes	%
**Michael Oshry**	**5,433**	**29.2**
Jim Gibbon	4,805	25.8
Terry Diane Demers	3,313	17.8
Rob Hennigar	2,249	12.1
Rodolfo 'Rudy' Arcilla	1,081	5.8
Allan Santos	1,002	5.4
Brian Kendrick	297	1.6
Alla Ternikova	282	1.5
Mark Grandish	173	0.9

- Rudy Arcilla - former Catholic school trustee
- Terry Demers - president of community league, finished second in the 2010 Ward 3 race
- Jim Gibbon - brewery founder
- Mark Grandish - finished fourth in the 2010 Ward 5 race
- Rob Hennigar - business owner
- Brian Kendrick - finished third in the 2010 Ward 5 race
- Michael Oshry - business owner
- Allan Santos - transit operator
- Alla Ternikova - construction business manager

=== Ward 6 ===
Ward 6
Candidate	Votes	%	Candidate	Votes	%
**Scott McKeen**	**6,352**	**36.0**	Carla Frost	268	1.5
Heather MacKenzie	4,698	26.6	Kyle Brown	254	1.4
Dexx Williams	1,942	11.0	Taz Bouchier	199	1.1
Derrick Forsythe	1,163	6.6	Adil Pirbhai	177	1.0
Bryan George Kapitza	928	5.3	Andrzej Gudanowski	171	1.0
Candas Jane Dorsey	478	2.7	Javed Sommers*	85	0.5
Melinda Hollis	469	2.7	Alfie White	73	0.4
Terry Parada	310	1.8	Erin Northey	66	0.4

* indicates withdrew from race after nomination day

- Taz Bouchier
- Kyle Brown - city employee
- Candas Jane Dorsey - writer
- Derrick Forsythe - provincial employee
- Carla Frost - finished fifth in the 2010 Ward 6 race
- Melinda Hollis - psychotherapist
- Bryan Kapitza - finished second in the 2010 Ward 6 race
- Heather MacKenzie - former public school trustee
- Scott McKeen - finished second in the 2010 Ward 7 race, journalist
- Erin Northey - swim instructor
- Adil Pirbhai - finished seventh in the 1998 Ward 5 race, accountant
- Javed Sommers - public service auditor, withdrew from race on October 19 and endorsed Heather MacKenzie
- Alfie White - mechanic
- Dexx Williams - financial advisor

=== Ward 7 ===
Ward 7
Candidate	Votes	%
**Tony Caterina**	**6,064**	**42.1**
Dave Colburn	4,892	34.0
Mimi Williams	1,770	12.3
Tish Prouse	1,053	7.3
Terry Rolls	476	3.3
A. Daniel Eniafe	154	1.1

- Tony Caterina - incumbent
- Dave Colburn - former public school board chairman
- Tish Prouse - archeologist
- Terry Rolls - finished fourth in the 2010 Ward 7 race
- Mimi Williams - finished third in the 2001 Ward 2 race, activist

=== Ward 8 ===
Ward 8
Candidate	Votes	%
**Ben Henderson**	**14,651**	**74.5**
Heather Workman	2,603	13.2
Brian A. Deacon	1,417	7.2
Kris Szczepanski	535	2.7
Nicholas Reading	448	2.3

- Ben Henderson - incumbent

=== Ward 9 ===
Ward 9
Candidate	Votes	%
**Bryan Anderson**	**18,735**	**82.6**
Andrew Gorman	3,952	17.4

- Bryan Anderson - incumbent
- Andrew Gorman - Edmonton International Airport employee

=== Ward 10 ===
Ward 10
Candidate	Votes	%
**Michael Walters**	**11,807**	**63.9**
Richard Feehan	3,818	20.7
Hafis Devji	1,509	8.2
Dan 'Can Man Dan' Johnstone	907	4.9
Ray Bessel	444	2.4

- Ray Bessel - businessman
- Hafis Devji - businessman
- Richard Feehan - university instructor
- Dan Johnstone (also known as "Can Man Dan") - activist
- Michael Walters - community organizer

=== Ward 11 ===
Ward 11
Candidate	Votes	%
**Mike Nickel**	**8,235**	**47.8**
Sonia Bitar	2,488	14.4
Harvey Panesar	2,318	13.5
Brent Schaffrick	1,433	8.3
Dennis John Gane	1,123	6.5
Mujahid Chak	920	5.3
Roberto Maglalang	475	2.8
Rob Aromin	228	1.3

- Rob Aromin - labourer
- Sonia Bitar - former citizenship judge
- Mujahid Chak - public servant
- Dennis Gane - businessman
- Roberto Maglalang - finished sixth in the 2010 Ward 11 race, human resources director
- Mike Nickel - former councillor
- Harvey Panesar - mixed martial arts promoter
- Brent Schaffrick - finished third in the 2010 Ward 11 race, drilling consultant

=== Ward 12 ===
Ward 12
Candidate	Votes	%
**Amarjeet Sohi**	**13,427**	**76.8**
Chinwe Okelu	3,572	20.4
Raja Abbas	479	2.7

- Chinwe Okelu - finished second in the 2010 Ward 11 race
- Amarjeet Sohi - incumbent

=== Public school trustees ===
Edmonton Public School
Candidate	Votes	%
Ward A
**Cheryl R Johner**	**Acclaimed**	
Ward B
**Michelle Draper**	**6,271**	**53.1**
Carl Kaminsky	3,413	28.9
Steve Jaswal	2,120	18.0
Ward C
**Orville Chubb**	**3,876**	**28.1**
Susan Ketteringham	3,714	27.0
Tina Jardine	3,252	23.6
Karen J. Pheasant	2,939	21.3
Ward D
**Ray Martin**	**6,306**	**60.8**
Elizabeth Johannson	4,059	39.2
Ward E
**Ken Gibson**	**6,959**	**48.0**
Bridget Stirling	4,469	30.8
Lorraine Wheatley	3,077	21.2
Ward F
**Michael Christopher Janz**	**14,709**	**80.0**
Noah Shillington	3,670	20.0
Ward G
**Sarah Hoffman**	**Acclaimed**	
Ward H
**Nathan Ip**	**6,475**	**32.7**
Weslyn Mather	5,992	30.2
Mike Lanteigne	3,691	18.6
Julie Davies-Jodoin	3,656	18.5
Ward I
**Sherry Adams**	**9,795**	**64.4**
Leslie Ann Cleary	5,421	35.6

=== Separate school trustees ===
Edmonton Catholic Schools
Candidate	Votes	%
Ward 71
**Patricia Grell**	**2,709**	**44.6**
Terry Harris	1,779	29.3
Zach Koziak	1,588	26.1
Ward 72
**Larry Kowalczyk**	**4,551**	**62.4**
Dan Posa	2,748	37.6
Ward 73
**Cindy Olsen**	**4,246**	**58.8**
Michelle Davis	1,551	21.5
Jennifer Chahal	1,422	19.7
Ward 74
**Debbie Engel**	**5,535**	**67.7**
Brad Lohner	2,641	32.3
Ward 75
**John Acheson**	**4,107**	**50.4**
Andrea Klotz	4,037	49.6
Ward 76
**Marilyn Bergstra**	**5,409**	**56.7**
Tom Solyom	4,132	43.3
Ward 77
**Laura Thibert**	**3,650**	**47.6**
Kara Pelech	1,998	26.1
Stephen Dufresne	1,375	17.9
Roger Riashy	640	8.4

== Mayoral opinion polling ==
Polling firm	Date	Don Iveson	Karen Leibovici	Kerry Diotte	Other	Sample size	Polling method
Election	October 21, 2013	61.88	19.28	15.41	Josh Semotiuk 1.22%, Gordon Ward 1.05%, Kristine Acielo 0.60%, Spoiled 0.56%	213,585	ballot
Insights West	October 17–18, 2013	40	18	13	Undecided 25%, Other 4%	399	online
Leger Marketing	October 11–14, 2013	39	17	13	Undecided 25%, Not voting 4%, Kristine Acielo 1%, Josh Semotiuk 1%, Gordon Ward 1%	809	online
Edmonton Sun	October 7–13, 2013	42	20	33	Josh Semotiuk 2%, Gordon Ward 2%, Kristine Acielo 1%	1,137	online
Praxis Analytics	October 10, 2013	40.1	17	16.7	Undecided 19.2%, Other 7%	4,144	telephone
Leger Marketing	September 11–17, 2013	20	11	12	Undecided 51%, Not voting 6%	404	online

== 2015 by-election ==
On May 5, 2015, Sarah Hoffman left her position as Ward G trustee for Edmonton Public Schools, and was elected as an MLA in the Alberta general election for Edmonton-Glenora. The 2015 Edmonton municipal by-election was held on Monday September 28, 2015 to elect one trustee to replace Hoffman.

Ward G
Candidate	Votes	%
Bridget Stirling	528	47.1
Ros Smith	371	30.2
Rob Bernshaw	110	9.0
Kristen Kuefler	55	4.5
Aminah Aboughoushe	53	4.3
Wayde Lever	33	2.7
Christopher Suchit	22	1.8
R.J. Koopmans	5	0.4

== 2016 by-election ==
In October 2015 Amarjeet Sohi left his position as Ward 12 city councillor, after being elected as an MP in the Canadian federal election for Edmonton Mill Woods. The 2016 Edmonton municipal by-election was held on Monday February 22, 2016 to elect one councillor to replace Sohi. With 32 candidates running, the by-election had a record number of candidates for a by-election in Alberta.

Ward 12
Candidate	Votes	%	Candidate	Votes	%
Moe Banga	2,359	17.76	Nick Chamchuk	222	1.67
Laura Thibert	1,283	9.66	Nicole Szymanowka	193	1.45
Arundeep Singh Sandhu	1,106	8.33	Jag Gill	169	1.27
Irfan Chaudhry	950	7.15	Lincoln Ho	146	1.10
Nav Kaur	888	6.69	Jagat Singh Sheoran	122	0.92
Danisha Bhaloo	843	6.35	Steve 'CP' Toor	93	0.70
Preet Toor	665	5.01	Jeri Stevens	90	0.68
Sam Jhajj	612	4.61	Terry J. Mckinnon	49	0.37
Rakesh Patel	542	4.08	Andrew Gorman	40	0.30
Brian Henderson	541	4.07	Jason Bale	37	0.28
Balraj Singh Manhas	466	3.51	Victor Viorel Bujor	37	0.28
Dan 'Can Man Dan' Johnstone	436	3.28	Kelly A. Kadla	33	0.25
Mike Butler	371	2.79	Nirpal Sekhon	29	0.22
Yash Sharma	334	2.52	Stephen Wutzke	23	0.17
Field Pieterse	315	2.37	Shani Ahmad	20	0.15
Don Koziak	260	1.96	R. Joey Koopmans	5	0.04
