= 2010 Edmonton municipal election =

Canadian municipal election

2010 Edmonton mayoral election
- October 18, 2010
- Turnout: 33.43% (▲6.19 pp)
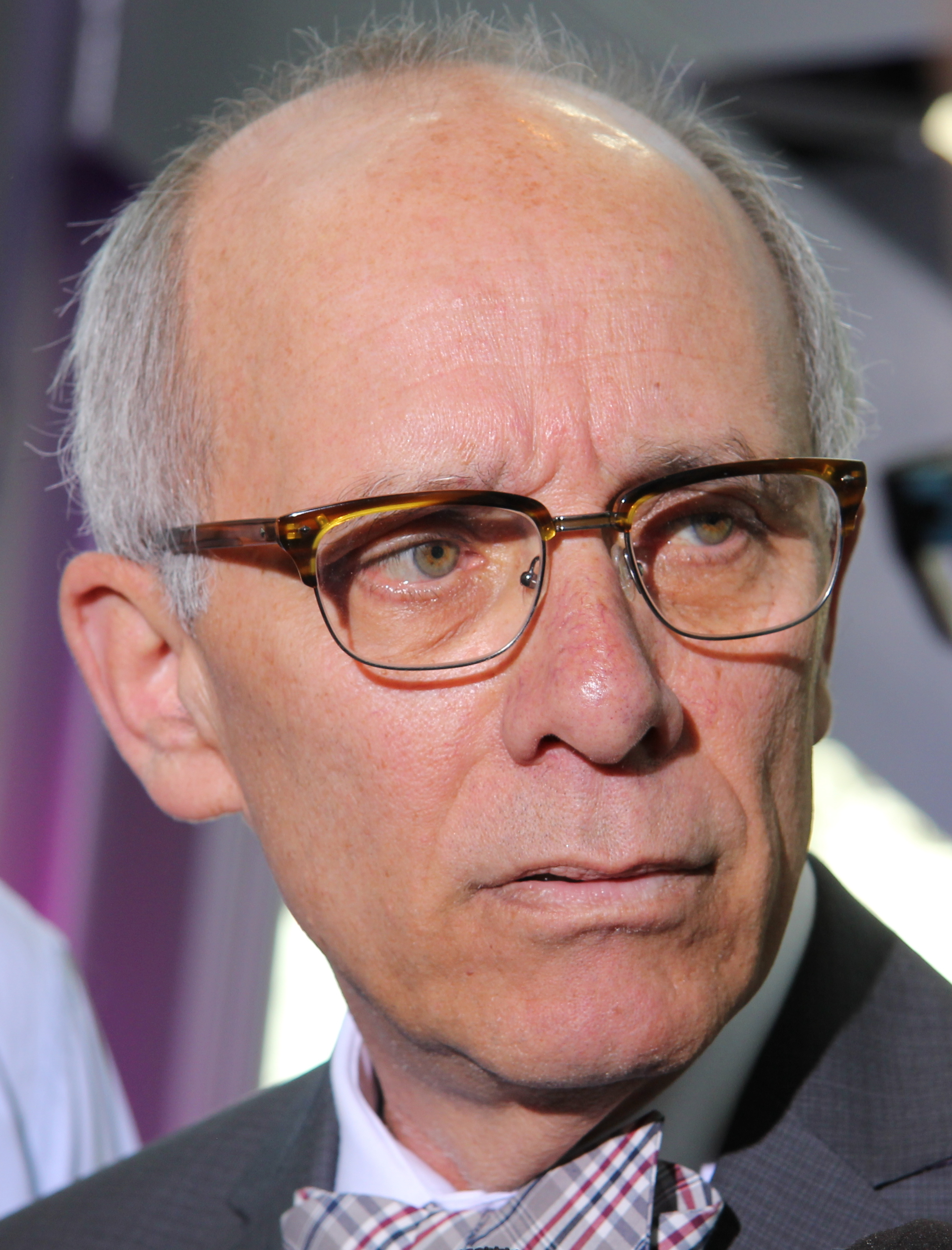

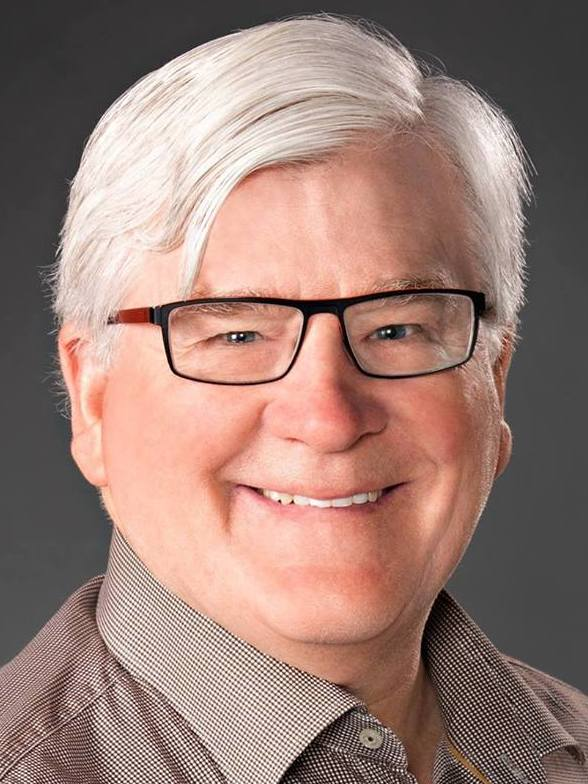

Candidate	Stephen Mandel	David Dorward	Daryl Bonar
Popular vote	109,432	58,856	20,672
Percentage	55.23%	29.70%	10.43%
Mayor before election
Stephen Mandel
Elected mayor
Stephen Mandel

The 2010 Edmonton municipal election was held Monday, October 18, 2010 to elect a mayor and 12 councillors to the city council, the nine trustees to Edmonton Public Schools, and the seven trustees to the Edmonton Catholic Schools. Two incumbent public school trustees had no challengers so were elected by acclamation.

Since 1968, provincial legislation had required every municipality to hold triennial elections.

On July 22, 2009, city council voted to change the electoral system of six wards to a system of 12 wards; each represented by a single councillor elected by first-past-the-post voting, the changes took effect for the 2010 election. Of the estimated 596,406 eligible voters, only 199,359 turned in a ballot, a voter turnout of 33.4%. A municipal census conducted in 2009 showed a population of 782,439, meaning approximately 76.2% of the population was eligible to vote.

The mayor was elected in the city at-large and councillors elected in single-member wards to three-year terms. All contests were conducted according to the first past the post (FPTP) system. Although FPTP elects the candidate that receives the most votes, it does not always produce a winner that has received over 50% of the votes. The winner in seven of the 12 city councillor contests was elected with less than a majority of the votes cast.

== Candidates ==
Bold indicates elected, italics indicates incumbent.

=== Mayor ===
Mayor
Candidate	Votes	%
**Stephen Mandel**	**109,432**	**55.23**
David Dorward	58,856	29.70
Daryl Bonar	20,672	10.43
Dan Dromarsky	4,621	2.33
Dave Dowling	2,295	1.16
Andrew Lineker	1,131	0.57
Bob Ligertwood	1,129	0.57
**Total**	**198,136**	**100**

=== Councillors ===
Councillors
Ward 1			Ward 2			Ward 3		
Candidate	Votes	%	Candidate	Votes	%	Candidate	Votes	%
**Linda Sloan**	**8,836**	**55.7**	**Kim Krushell**	**6,855**	**43.4**	**Dave Loken**	**3,953**	**28.1**
Andrew Knack	5,369	33.8	Don Koziak	6,303	39.9	Terry Demers	3,446	24.5
Jamie Kenneth Post	1,668	10.5	Shelley Tupper	1,103	7.0	John Oplanich	2,340	16.6
Ward 4			Roxie Malone-Richards	772	4.9	Kim Cassady	1,454	10.3
**Ed Gibbons**	**6,524**	**46.2**	Thomas Hinderks	539	3.4	Louis Sobolewski	922	6.5
Dan Backs	5,466	38.7	Michael Waddy	233	1.5	Hatem Naboulsi	788	5.6
Hafsa Goma	846	6.0	Ward 5			Michael Suess	633	4.5
Ken Atkinson	811	5.7	**Karen Leibovici**	**11,893**	**72.1**	Greg Siver	404	2.9
Scott Robb	467	3.3	Steve Bergeron	3,211	19.5	Shawn Fairbridge	149	1.1
Ward 6			Brian Kendrick	987	6.0	Ward 7		
**Jane Batty**	**7,187**	**44.7**	Mark Grandish	409	2.5	**Tony Caterina**	**7,214**	**48.2**
Bryan Kapitza	3,220	20.0	Ward 8			Scott McKeen	5,355	35.8
James Johnson	2,548	15.8	**Ben Henderson**	**9,248**	**47.7**	Brendan Van Alstine	1,229	8.2
Chris Basualdo	1,599	9.9	Lori Jeffery-Heaney	4,990	25.8	Terry Rolls	667	4.5
Carla Frost	618	3.8	Sheila McKay	2,450	12.6	Grant Pullishy	506	3.4
Thomas Roberts	413	2.6	Hana Razga	1,930	10.0	Ward 9		
Lee Permann	313	1.9	Duane Good Striker	749	3.9	**Bryan Kent Anderson**	**12,688**	**69.7**
Adil Pirbhai	191	1.2	Ward 10			Jennifer Watts	2,582	14.2
Ward 11			**Don Iveson**	**13,059**	**76.3**	Calvin Lim	1,662	9.1
**Kerry Diotte**	**7,341**	**44.2**	Al Slemko	4,048	23.7	Rami Bader	1,269	7.0
Chinwe Okelu	4,728	28.5	Ward 12					
Brent Schaffrick	1,783	10.7	**Amarjeet Sohi**	**10,292**	**64.0**			
Shane Bergdahl	1,427	8.6	Chuck McKenna	4,208	26.1			
Vishal Luthra	890	5.4	Gerry Horn	1,165	7.2			
Roberto Maglalang	438	2.6	Vikram Bagga	428	2.7			

=== Public school trustees ===
Edmonton Public Schools
Ward A			Ward B			Ward C		
Candidate	Votes	%	Candidate	Votes	%	Candidate	Votes	%
**Cheryl Johner**	**9,140**	**67.7**	**Ken Shipka**	**5,231**	**41.1**	**Christopher Spencer**	**6,382**	**48.2**
Kevan Warner	3,042	22.5	Amanda Beisiegel	3,720	29.3	Tony Henshall	3,549	26.8
Rory Johannes Koopmans	1,317	9.8	Perry Chahal	1,710	13.4	Mary Gradisar	3,312	25.0
Ward D			George P. Nicholson	1,200	9.4	Ward E		
**Dave Colburn**	**Acclaimed**		Darryl Lagerquist	854	6.7	**Heather MacKenzie**	**4,947**	**37.7**
Ward F			Ward G			Neil MacDonald	4,155	31.7
**Michael Janz**	**9,198**	**53.6**	**Sarah Hoffman**	**14,270**	**69.8**	Ken Soroka	4,015	30.6
Bev Sawyer	5,845	34.1	George Rice	6,169	30.2	Ward H		
Joanna Rozmus	2,114	12.3	Ward I			**Catherine Ripley**	**Acclaimed**	
			**Leslie Cleary**	**6,045**	**41.6**			
			Tina Jardine	5,907	40.7			
			Balraj Manhas	2,577	17.7			

=== Separate school trustees ===
Edmonton Catholic Schools
Ward 71			Ward 72			Ward 73		
Candidate	Votes	%	Candidate	Votes	%	Candidate	Votes	%
**Becky Kallal**	**4,097**	**67.4**	**Larry Kowalczyk**	**3,088**	**45.0**	**Cindy Olsen**	**4,332**	**58.1**
Romeo Ochoa	1,981	32.6	Patricia Grell	1,990	29.0	Jennifer Chahal	2,007	26.9
Ward 74			Carla Smiley	1,788	26.0	Cynthia Bossmin-Davis	1,119	15.0
**Debbie Engel**	**5,384**	**71.9**	Ward 75			Ward 76		
Brad Lohner	2,107	28.1	**John Acheson**	**3,198**	**40.9**	**Marilyn Bergstra**	**4,016**	**50.2**
Ward 77			Lauri Friesen	2,605	33.3	Michael Savaryn	2,172	27.1
**Laura Thibert**	**2,422**	**35.8**	Rudy Arcilla	2,017	25.8	Bev Heisler	1,068	13.3
Kara Pelech	2,291	33.9				Katherine Schwabenbauer	748	9.3
Danny S. Kinal	2,044	30.3						

== Candidate summaries ==
=== Mayor ===
- Daryl Bonar - Canadian Forces lieutenant and real estate investor
- David Dorward - Chartered Accountant, Primary Owner of Edmonton Energy IBL basketball team
- Dave Dowling - Sales, Lapidary art worker
- Dan Dromarsky - Commercial Accounts Manager
- Bob Ligertwood - Small business owner, agriculture and heavy industry
- Andrew Lineker - PR & administration for three entertainment facilities
- Stephen Mandel - incumbent

=== Ward 1 ===
- Andrew Knack - finished third in the 2007 Ward 1 race
- Jamie Kenneth Post - I.T. Consultant
- Linda Sloan - incumbent

=== Ward 2 ===
- Thomas Hinderks - director of the Alberta Aviation Museum
- Don Koziak - hotel owner; only significant competition in 2007 mayor race, finished fourth in the 2004 Ward 2 race
- Kim Krushell - incumbent
- Roxie Malone-Richards - community activist, advocate for the disabled and those with mobility issues and a former 630 CHED broadcaster
- Shelley Tupper - finished fourth in the 2007 Ward 2 race
- Michael Waddy - Entrepreneur, web designer

=== Ward 3 ===
- Kim Cassady - ran as an Alberta Liberal candidate in Edmonton-Highlands-Norwood during the 2001 provincial election
- Terry Demers - Ron Hayter's assistant
- Shawn Philip Fairbridge -
- Dave Loken - finished third in 2007 and 2004 in Ward 2
- Hatem Naboulsi - Businessman
- John (Giovanni) Oplanich - land developer
- Greg Silver - Paramedic
- Louis Sobolewski - Auditor
- Michael Suess - Market & finance

=== Ward 4 ===
- Ken Atkinson - former member of the Canadian Armed Forces
- Dan Backs - former Liberal member of the Legislative Assembly of Alberta, later sought a provincial Progressive Conservative nomination
- Ed Gibbons - incumbent
- Hafsa Goma - a former MLA
- Scott Robb -

=== Ward 5 ===
- Steve Bergeron - Real estate investor
- Mark Grandish - Tow-truck driver
- Brian Kendrick - general contractor
- Karen Leibovici - incumbent

=== Ward 6 ===
- Cris Basualdo - Edmonton District Labour Council endorsement.
- Jane Batty - incumbent
- Carla Frost -
- James Johnson - Wildrose Alliance staffer
- Bryan George Kapitza - CSU 52 endorsement. Former unionist / current small business owner.
- Lee Permann - Operations Manager
- Adil Pirbhai - finished twelfth in the 2007 Ward 4 race
- Thomas Roberts -

=== Ward 7 ===
- Tony Caterina - incumbent
- Scott McKeen - former Edmonton Journal columnist
- Grant David Pullishy - Brewery worker
- Terry Rolls - Assistant shipper/receiver at NAIT, garbageman, writer
- Brendan Van Alstine - social worker

=== Ward 8 ===
- Duane Good Striker -
- Ben Henderson - incumbent
- Lori Jeffery-Heaney - finished fifth in the 2007 Ward 6 race
- Sheila Mckay - finished fifth in the 2007 Ward 4 race
- Hana Razga - finished sixth in the 2007 Ward 4 race

=== Ward 9 ===
- Bryan Kent Anderson - incumbent
- Rami Bader -
- Calvin Lim - Financial advisor, insurance broker
- Jennifer Watts -

=== Ward 10 ===
- Don Iveson - incumbent
- Al Slemko - finished fourth in the 2004 Ward 5 race

=== Ward 11 ===
- Shane Bergdahl - Chair of the Mill Woods Presidents' Council (association of community leagues)
- Kerry Diotte - former Edmonton SUN columnist
- Vishal Luthra - 1998 Youth Justice Committee member
- Roberto Maglalang - HR Director/Manager
- Chinwe Okelu - Alberta Government, Department of Housing
- Brent Schaffrick - Twelve years in Canadian Primary Naval Reserve

=== Ward 12 ===
- Vikram Bagga - Owner of Bagga Jeweller
- Gerry Horn - Worked as a bricklayer, some carpentry, and general construction
- Chuck McKenna - finished fourth in the 2007 Ward 6 race
- Amarjeet Sohi - incumbent
