= 1995 Edmonton municipal election =

Municipal election in Alberta, Canada

The 1995 Edmonton municipal election was held October 16, 1995 to elect a mayor and twelve aldermen to sit on Edmonton City Council, nine trustees to sit on the public school board, and seven trustees to sit on the separate school board. Edmontonians also decided two plebiscite questions.

Councillors were elected in two-seat wards.

This was the first election in which the public school board used nine wards instead of six to elect its trustees.

== Electoral system ==
Mayor was elected through first past the post.

Councillors were elected through plurality block voting, two per ward, where each voter could cast up to two votes.

Public school board trustees were elected through first past the post.

The Separate school board trustees were elected through a different system—one trustee was elected from each ward through first past the post, and the seventh seat was filled by the non-victorious candidate with the most total votes anywhere in the city.

== Voter turnout ==
There were 221,236 ballots cast out of 440,044 eligible voters, for a voter turnout of 50.3%.

== Results ==
(bold indicates elected, italics indicate incumbent)

=== Mayor ===
Candidate	Votes	%
**Bill Smith**	**79,832**	**36.48%**
Jan Reimer	78,514	36.02%
John Ramsey	42,044	19.29%
Brad Checknita	10,361	4.75%
Lance White	7,081	3.25%
Bob Ligertwood	563	0.26%
Paul Earley	452	0.21%

=== Aldermen ===
Ward 1		Ward 2		Ward 3		Ward 4		Ward 5		Ward 6	
**Leroy Chahley**	**24,822**	**Allan Bolstad**	**16,802**	**Brian Mason**	**23,769**	**Jim Taylor**	**8,531**	**Larry Langley**	**13,360**	**Terry Cavanagh**	**17,664**
**Wendy Kinsella**	**21,456**	**Rose Rosenberger**	**15,189**	**Robert Noce**	**13,526**	**Michael Phair**	**8,031**	**Brent Maitson**	**12,989**	**Dick Mather**	**17,117**
Bruce Campbell	15,715	Lori Hall	11,195	Sherry McKibben	8,471	Terence Harding	7,809	Lillian Staroszik	12,600	Dave Thiele	13,237
Roger Kotch	5,263	Ed Powell	10,629	John Bethel	8,141	Brian Bechtel	7,158	Margaret Asch	10,832	Sheila McKay	11,652
Joe Goebel	2,334	Bradley Day	1,752	Bill Maxim	8,096	Tooker Gomberg	7,031	Sheilah Montgomery	9,076	Riaz Choudhry	6,595
		Carl Williams	1,393	Jerry Kitt	2,571	Janice Fleming	4,441	Craig Murray	5,429	Ken Kozak	4,250
		Perry Dane	1,245	Veronika Greenwald	1,559	Sean Armstrong	2,863	Donald McMann	4,063	Art Clarke	4,092
				Hatem Naboulsi	882	David Ward	1,949	Don Koziak	2,644	Charles Relland	2,128
						Helene Donahue	1,619	Elaine Jones	2,600		
						Frank Klemen	1,012	Olga Cylurik	872		
						Rod Foster	696	Monty Worobec	684		
						Sui Wing Mak	621	Adil Pirbhai	548		
						Dennis Clark	440	Josephine Koper	503		
						Wes Barlow	395				
						George Richardson	354				
						Thomas Tomlinson	294				
						Art Sproul	253				

=== Public school trustees ===
Ward A			Ward B			Ward D			Ward F			Ward H		
**Bill Bonko**	**4,480**	**33.48%**	**Janice Melnychuk**	**6,355**	**51.34%**	**Terry Sulyma**	**5,779**	**50.88%**	**Don Fleming**	**6,914**	**46.22%**	**George Nicholson**	**Acclaimed**	
Maureen Ford	2,441	18.24%	John Nicoll	5,108	41.27%	Mimi Williams	5,578	49.12%	Jim Selby	4,424	29.57%			
Cathy Kutryk	2,175	16.25%	Matt Diederichs	915	7.39%				Michael Ekelund	3,621	24.21%			
Joe Hak	1,933	14.45%	Ward C			Ward E			Ward G			Ward I		
Larry Phillips	800	5.98%	**Don Williams**	**9,295**	**56.23%**	**Jean Woodrow**	**9,685**	**66.30%**	**Kay Chernowski**	**5,780**	**32.00%**	**Gerry Gibeault**	**7,106**	**45.95%**
Perry Dane	565	4.22%	Leon Lubin	7,120	43.77%	Stephen Mandel	4,922	33.70%	Jim Patrick	4,774	26.43%	Bev Esslinger	6,004	38.83%
Victor Varvis	559	4.18%							Marianne Stolz	4,152	22.99%	Jeff Caskenette	2,353	15.22%
Dan McAra	428	3.20%							Anna Der	3,354	18.57%			

=== Separate (Catholic) school trustees ===
One trustee is elected from each ward, and the unsuccessful candidate (across the city) with the most votes is also elected.

Ward 1			Ward 2			Ward 3		
**David MacDougall**	**4,843**	**52.48%**	**Ronald Zapisocki**	**6,433**	**58.13%**	**Mary-Anne Razzolini**	**7,247**	**69.88%**
John Patrick Day	4,386	47.52%	**Jim Urlacher**	**4,633**	**41.87%**	Jim Shinkaruk	3,123	30.12%
Ward 4			Ward 5			Ward 6		
**Ron Patsula**	**3,496**	**57.00%**	**Michael Savaryn**	**4,444**	**55.29%**	**Brian Mitchell**	**5,415**	**57.44%**
Cindy Holan	2,637	43.00%	Alice Leung	3,594	44.71%	Barbara Ann Thompson	4,011	42.56%

=== Plebiscites ===
==== Edmonton Municipal Airport ====
Do you direct City Council to repeal "The Edmonton Municipal Airport referendum bylaw" (No. 10,205)? That bylaw requires the City to operate the Municipal Airport and promote that airport's air passenger service.

A "YES" vote means that the City will promote MOVING scheduled air passenger service to the Edmonton International Airport.

A "NO" vote means that the City will promote MAINTAINING scheduled air passenger service at the Edmonton Municipal Airport.

Under both options the City will continue to own and offer general air services (e.g. private planes, small charters, air ambulance) at the Municipal Airport.

	Votes	%
**Yes**	**166,404**	**76.81%**
No	50,253	23.19%

==== Keillor Road ====
Do you direct City Council to PASS the Keillor Road Referendum Bylaw (No. 11, 124)?

A "YES" vote means the City must leave Keillor Road OPEN to traffic, including motor vehicle traffic.

A "NO" vote means City should CLOSE Keillor Road.

	Votes	%
Yes	92,807	43.67%
**No**	**119,693**	**56.33%**
