= Karen Leibovici =

Canadian politician (born 1952)

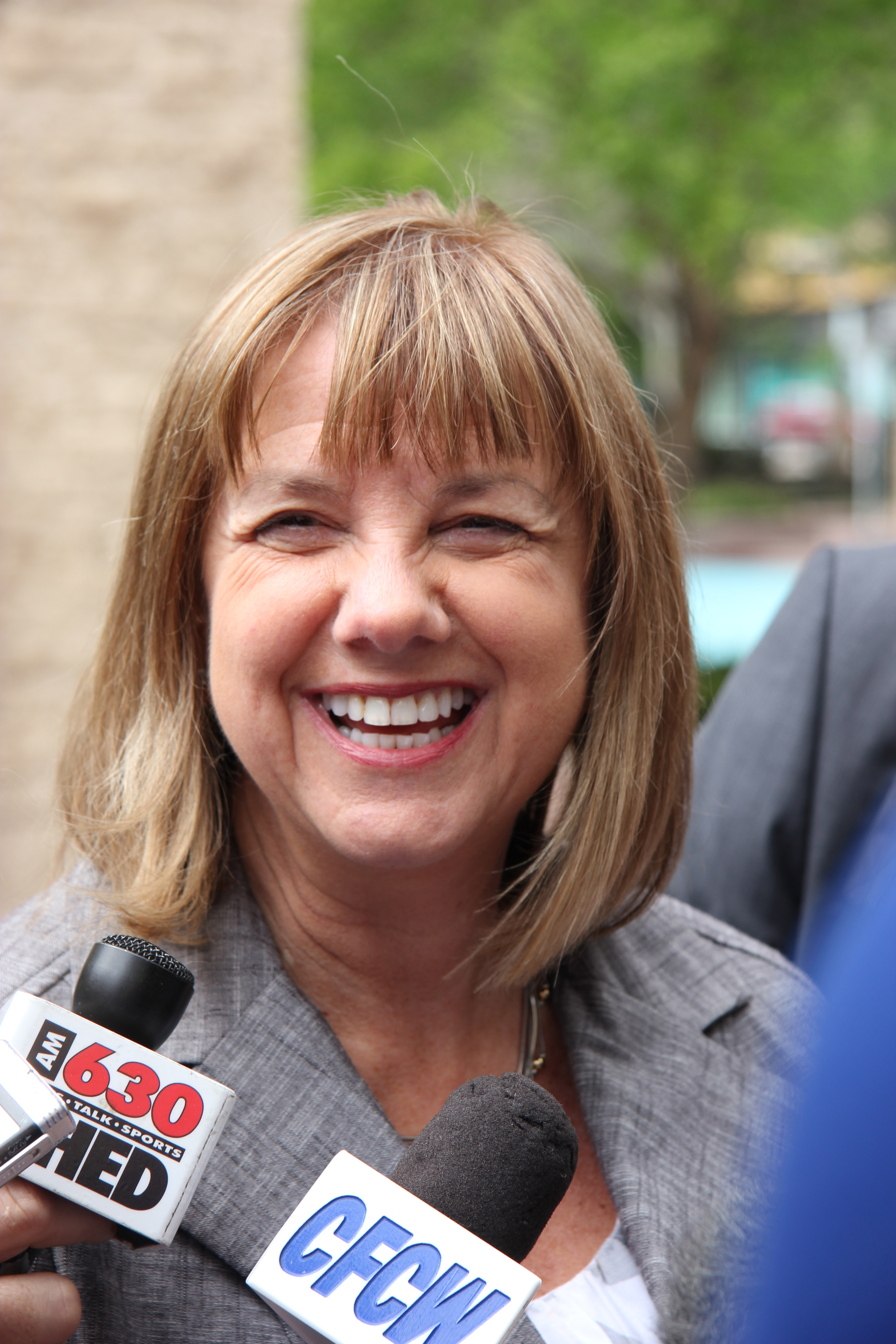
- Karen Leibovici in 2013

Member of the Legislative Assembly of Alberta
- In office 1993–2001
- Preceded by: Grant Mitchell
- Succeeded by: Bob Maskell
- Constituency: Edmonton Meadowlark

Edmonton City Councillor, Ward 1
- In office 2001–2010 Serving with Stephen Mandel, Linda Sloan
- Preceded by: Leroy Chahley, Wendy Kinsella
- Succeeded by: Dual-member wards abolished

Edmonton City Councillor, Ward 5
- In office 2010–2013
- Preceded by: New single-member ward
- Succeeded by: Michael Oshry

Personal details
- Born: May 27, 1952 (age 74) Montreal, Quebec
- Party: Alberta Liberal Party
- Spouse: Stephen Ivan Zepp
- Children: Adam Zepp
- Education: McGill University
- Occupation: Social Worker

Karen Leibovici (born May 27, 1952) is a politician from Edmonton, Alberta.

Following a career as a social worker, Leibovici was elected to the Legislative Assembly of Alberta in 1993, representing Edmonton Meadowlark as a member of the Alberta Liberal Party. She held that seat for two terms until her defeat in 2001. While MLA, she held the positions of labour critic, health critic, intergovernmental affairs critic and caucus whip.

In the 2001 Edmonton municipal election she was elected to city council, and was subsequently re-elected in 2004 and 2007 for Ward 1 and 2010 for Ward 5. She has served as chair or vice chair of the community services, executive and transportation and public works committees, and the Edmonton Police Commission.

While on the city council, Leibovici was a board member for the Federation of Canadian Municipalities for nine years, and was acclaimed as the president in 2013. She was influential in spearheading the city's 10-year plan to end homelessness, revitalizing retail in west Edmonton, and through the Federation of Canadian Municipalities, brokered a $53 billion infrastructure plan with the federal government for funding municipal projects across the country.

== 2013 municipal election ==
Leibovici ran for mayor in Edmonton in 2013, against fellow councillors Don Iveson and Kerry Diotte.

Mayor
Candidate	Votes	%
Don Iveson	132,162	62.2
Karen Leibovici	41,182	19.4
Kerry Diotte	32,917	15.5
Joshua Semotiuk	2,596	1.2
Gordon Ward	2,248	1.1
Kristine Acielo	1,292	0.6

== 2015 federal election ==
She was most recently a Liberal Party of Canada candidate in Edmonton West for the 2015 federal election, but lost to Conservative Party candidate Kelly McCauley.
