= Tony Caterina =

Canadian politician

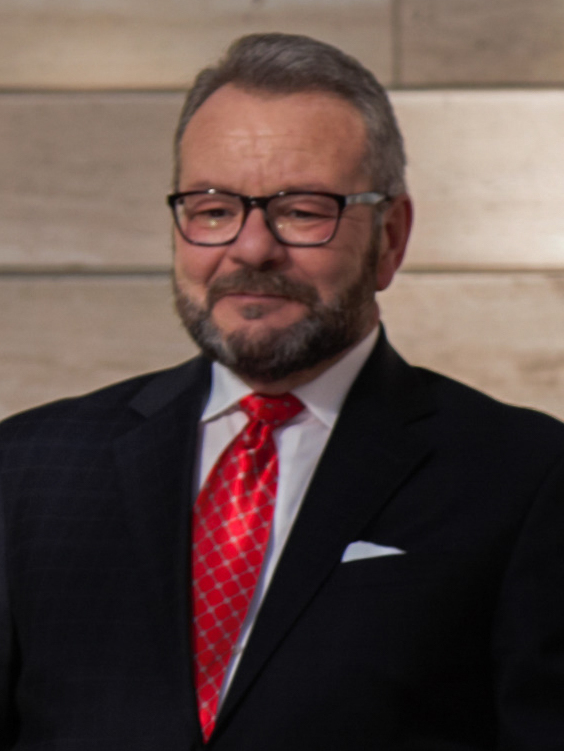
- Caterina in 2016

City of Edmonton Councillor
- In office 2010–2021
- Preceded by: New Ward
- Succeeded by: Anne Stevenson (new ward)
- Constituency: Ward 7
- In office 2007–2010
- Preceded by: Janice Melnychuk
- Succeeded by: Dave Loken
- Constituency: Ward 3

Personal details
- Born: March 28, 1956 (age 70) Montagano, Italy
- Spouse: Orietta
- Children: 3
- Occupation: City councillor, businessman
- Website: www.tonycaterina.ca

Tony Caterina (born March 28, 1956, in Montagano, Italy) is a Canadian businessman and politician who served on the Edmonton City Council from 2007 to 2021. He formerly represented Ward 7 from 2010 to 2021. In 2021, he ran in the new constituency of O-Day'min but lost to newcomer urban planner Anne Stevenson. Provincially, Tony Caterina ran for election as the Progressive Conservative candidate in the riding of Edmonton-Beverly-Clareview and lost in the May 5, 2015, election to NDP incumbent Deron Bilous.

== Early life ==
Tony Caterina was born in Italy. His family moved to Canada in 1962 and settled in Edmonton, Alberta. He began an education degree at the University of Alberta, but ultimately majored in history.

Caterina founded three clothing stores in 1974 and later founded a local industrial pipe insulation company. He became involved in civic politics as a member of the Board of Directors for the Alberta Avenue Business Association.

== Political career ==
Caterina was seeking election to be the MLA in the Edmonton-Beverly-Clareview riding and lost in the May 5, 2015, election.

Caterina ran for a seat on Edmonton's municipal council as a candidate in the 2004 Edmonton municipal election in Ward 3.

Caterina ran for a seat to the Legislative Assembly of Alberta in the electoral district of Edmonton-Centre in the 2004 Alberta general election.

After another failed bid for a seat in the Legislative Assembly of Alberta, Caterina was disqualified from running in future Alberta elections due to an $11,000 campaign deficit that he was unable to pay back.

=== City councillor (2007–2021) ===
Caterina ran for Edmonton municipal council a second time in the 2007 Edmonton municipal election. He took the seat in an eight-way race for Ward 6.

Caterina attempted to keep Edmonton Centre Airport CYXD from being closed. He has been a fiscal conservative on council encouraging the city to exercise budgetary restraint. He serves as a representative for the City of Edmonton as a member of the Board of Directors for Northlands since being elected in 2007.

Following the change in electoral boundaries, Caterina ran for a second term in office in Ward 7 in the 2010 Edmonton municipal election. Although Tony's campaign signs were targeted and marked by graffiti artists in 2010, he won his campaign for Ward 7.

Caterina was reelected in Ward 7 in the 2013 Edmonton municipal election.

In 2021, he ran in the new constituency of O-Day'min but lost to newcomer urban planner Anne Stevenson.

=== 2025 mayoral campaign ===
On November 19, 2024, Caterina announced his bid for mayor in the 2025 Edmonton municipal election, however ultimately came in sixth place with 3.1% of the vote.
