= Saskatchewan Human Rights Commission v Whatcott =

- Supreme Court of Canada

Hearing: 12 October 2011 Judgment: 27 February 2013
- Full case name: Saskatchewan Human Rights Commission v William Whatcott
- Citations: 2013 SCC 11, [2013] 1 SCR 467
- Docket No.: 33676
- Prior history: Appeal from 2010 SKCA 26
- Ruling: Appeal allowed in part.

Holding
- Section 14(1)(b) of the Saskatchewan Human Rights Code infringes both sections 2(a) and 2(b) of the Canadian Charter of Rights and Freedoms but is saved by section 1 of the Charter.

Court membership
- Chief Justice: Beverley McLachlin; Puisne Justices: Ian Binnie, Louis LeBel, Marie Deschamps, Morris Fish, Rosalie Abella, Marshall Rothstein, Thomas Cromwell

Reasons given
- Unanimous reasons by: Rothstein
- Binnie and Deschamps took no part in the consideration or decision of the case.

Saskatchewan Human Rights Commission v Whatcott is a Canadian constitutional law case concerning the constitutionality of the provision in Saskatchewan's human rights legislation prohibiting publications likely to expose to hatred on a prohibited ground, in this case sexual orientation.

== Background ==
Four complainants brought an application to the Saskatchewan Human Rights Commission after receiving flyers entitled "Keep Homosexuality out of Saskatoon's Public Schools!" and "Sodomites in our Public Schools" from Christian anti-homosexual activist Bill Whatcott. The complainants alleged a violation of section 14 of The Saskatchewan Human Rights Code (SHRC), which prohibits "publication or display of any representation that exposes or tends to expose to hatred, ridicules, belittles or otherwise affronts the dignity of any person or class of persons on the basis of a prohibited ground". Sexual orientation was one such prohibited ground. The Saskatchewan Human Rights Tribunal heard the case. It held that the contents of each flyer objectively contravened section 14 of the SHRC, and that the provision did not unreasonably restrict Whatcott's section 2(b) Charter rights. The tribunal prohibited Whatcott from further distributing the flyers and awarded compensation to the complainants.

Upon appeal to the Saskatchewan Court of Queen's Bench in 2007, the appeals judge upheld the tribunal's findings with respect to the violation of section 14 of the SHRC and its constitutionality. In 2010, the case was appealed to the Saskatchewan Court of Appeal. That court held that the tribunal and the trial judge had erred by considering only certain phrases from the flyers and that the flyers were not a prohibited hate publication.

== Reasons of the Supreme Court ==
Twenty-six third parties acted as interveners during oral hearings in 2011. Justice Marshall Rothstein wrote the reasons for a unanimous Supreme Court.

=== Defining "hatred" ===
Rothstein began by considering the definition of "hatred" as contemplated in R v Taylor, where the Supreme Court had found that "hatred" as used in the Canadian Human Rights Act "refers to unusually strong and deep-felt emotions of detestation, calumny and vilification". He identified two primary difficulties arising alongside the Taylor hatred doctrine; namely, that hatred is inherently subjective, which could conflict with the court's attempt at objectivity, and that it could lead to a "mistaken propensity to focus on the ideas being expressed, rather than on the effect of the expression". In response to these criticisms, Rothstein adapted the Taylor standard by holding that it should be conducted objectively, that "hatred" should be interpreted as "extreme manifestations of the emotion described by the words 'detestation' and 'vilification'", a threshold which would not include merely repugnant or offensive expression, and that tribunals should consider the effect of the expression, not its inherent offensiveness.

=== Freedom of expression analysis ===
Rothstein next analyzed the constitutionality of section 14(1)(b) of the SHRC, applying the correctness standard of review. He held that the expression was protected by section 2(b) of the Charter, and proceeded to conduct a section 1 Oakes test. He described the purpose of the legislation as "reducing the harmful effects and social costs of discrimination by tackling certain causes of discriminatory activity", noting its emotional and societal effects on vulnerable groups and its ability to impede democratic discussion. Thus Rothstein found that the provision was prescribed by law and that its objective was pressing and substantial.

==== Rational connection ====
Next, Rothstein considered whether the section 14(1)(b) limitation on free expression was rationally connected to the legislation's purpose. He wrote that such expression "must seek to marginalize the group by affecting its social status and acceptance in the eyes of the majority" in order for a rational connection to exist. Since section 14(1)(b) only captured hate speech communicated in public, and since it applied only to expression based on existing prohibited grounds of discrimination, Rothstein found that the provision was rationally connected to the legislative objective. However, he found that the wording "ridicules, belittles or otherwise affronts the dignity of" contained in section 14(1)(b) of the SHRC was constitutionally invalid, since the threshold set by that language was too low and thus did not align with the legislation's purpose. The offending words were removed from the section.

==== Minimal impairment ====
Rothstein then considered whether the provision minimally impaired the impugned right to freedom of expression. He answered affirmatively, holding that alternative measures, including a "marketplace of ideas" and an expanded role for the criminal law in hate speech cases, would not achieve the legislative objective, or would only achieve it ineffectively. He held also that the provision was not overbroad once the language "ridicules, belittles or otherwise affronts the dignity of" was removed.

Rothstein rejected Whatcott's argument that the expression at issue was protected because it was political in nature:

[120] In my view, s. 14 of the Code provides an appropriate means by which to protect almost the entirety of political discourse as a vital part of freedom of expression. It extricates only an extreme and marginal type of expression which contributes little to the values underlying freedom of expression and whose restriction is therefore easier to justify.

Rothstein also rejected Whatcott's submission that his expression was protected because it differentiated between homosexual orientation and activity. Instead, he held that "attacks on conduct [that is a crucial aspect of the identity of the vulnerable group] stand as a proxy for attacks on the group itself". He also rejected arguments that the SHRC was overbroad because it did not require proof of intent or harm and because it did not offer any defences. He instead wrote that the analysis must focus on the effects of the impugned expression, not the communicator's intent, that the legislature is "entitled to a reasonable apprehension of societal harm as a result of hate speech", and that the absence of defences in the SHRC was not determinative; truthful statements or sincerely held beliefs do not affect the analysis, which must be undertaken from an objective standpoint.

==== Benefits and deleterious effects ====
Rothstein found that the benefits of the section 14(1)(b) prohibition on hate speech outweighed the "detrimental effect of restricting expression which, by its nature, does little to promote the values underlying freedom of expression".

=== Freedom of religion analysis ===
Next, Rothstein considered whether section 14(1)(b) of the SHRC infringed the freedom of religion enshrined in section 2(a) of the Charter. He concluded that section 2(a) had been infringed because Whatcott had a sincere religious belief and since section 14(1)(b) would significantly interfere with his ability to communicate his sincerely held beliefs. However, he found that the infringement was justified under section 1 of the Charter, but again held that the wording "ridicules, belittles or otherwise affronts the dignity of" was unconstitutional.

=== Application ===
Rothstein held that the standard of review of the Tribunal's decision was reasonableness, based on the Court's reasoning in Dunsmuir v New Brunswick. He found that the Tribunal's decision to read certain parts of the flyer in isolation was reasonable, since "even one phrase or sentence... found to bring the publication, as a whole, in contravention of the Code... precludes publication of the flyer in its current form". He also held that the Tribunal's application of section 14(1)(b) to two of Whatcott's flyers (Flyers D and E) was reasonable, since those flyers portrayed the targeted group "as a menace that could threaten the safety and well-being of others", objectively depicted them as "inferior [and] untrustworthy", "[vilified] those of same-sex orientation by portraying them as child abusers or predators", and called for discrimination against the portrayed group.

However, Rothstein found that the Tribunal's decision with respect to two other flyers (Flyers F and G) was unreasonable, since a reasonable person would not have found them to subject homosexuals to "detestation" and vilification". In particular, he noted that a Bible passage that Whatcott had quoted in Flyers F and G was not hateful expression, writing that "it would only be unusual circumstances and context that could transform a simple reading or publication of a religion’s holy text into what could objectively be viewed as hate speech".

=== Remedy ===
Rothstein reinstated the compensation for those complainants who had received flyers which were in contravention of the SHRC.

== Impact ==
Reaction to the Supreme Court's decision was mixed. Andrew Coyne called Whatcott a "calamitous decision", criticizing the Supreme Court's loose definition of "harm" and Rothstein's finding that "truth may be used for widely disparate ends". Charlie Gillis, writing for Maclean's, described the decision as a "missed opportunity to erect robust legal protections around a bedrock Canadian value".

Pearl Eliadis, writing for the Montreal Gazette, called the decision "reasonable and balanced" and found that it would "provide comfort to those concerned about being found liable for "offending" others".
