= Gerry Gibeault =

Canadian politician

Member of the Legislative Assembly of Alberta
- In office May 8, 1986 – June 15, 1993
- Preceded by: Milt Pahl
- Succeeded by: Don Massey
- Constituency: Edmonton-Mill Woods

City of Edmonton Public School Trustee
- In office October 16, 1995 – 2010
- Constituency: Ward I

Personal details
- Born: 1953 (age 72–73) Edmonton, Alberta, Canada
- Party: Alberta New Democrat

Gerry Gibeault (born 1953) is a former Canadian politician who was a school trustee with Edmonton Public Schools from 1995 to 2010 representing Ward I (Mill Woods). He also served as a member of the Legislative Assembly of Alberta from 1986 to 1993 sitting with the New Democratic Party caucus in opposition.

== Early life ==
Gibeault graduated from the University of Alberta where he attained a Bachelor of Arts in economics. He became a librarian for the Edmonton Catholic School Board, and then Central Alberta Media Services until he was elected to the Alberta Legislature in 1986.

== Provincial political career ==
Gibeault ran as a candidate for the New Democrats in the Edmonton-Mill Woods electoral district for the 1982 Alberta general election. He was defeated by incumbent Progressive Conservative MLA Milt Pahl.

Gibeault defeated Pahl in the 1986 Alberta general election. Pahl's popular support fell by 6,000 votes, while Gibeault also lost votes from the 1982 election. Gibeault improved his margin of victory running for a second term in the 1989 Alberta general election.

Giberault ran for a third term in the 1993 Alberta general election in the new electoral district of Edmonton-Ellerslie. He was defeated by Liberal candidate Debby Carlson.

== Municipal politics ==
Gibeault was elected as a public school trustee in the 1995 Edmonton municipal election. He won with 45% of the popular vote, defeating two other candidates in Ward I. He was re-elected in the 1998 Edmonton municipal election defeating David Fletcher in a two-way race, winning 54% of the vote. He was re-elected for a third term in the 2001 Edmonton municipal election over four challengers, winning 36% of the vote. Gibeault won a fourth term in the 2004 Edmonton municipal election defeating Judith Axelson. Gibeault defeated Axelson again in the 2007 Edmonton municipal election by fewer than 100 votes.
