= Bill Bonko =

Canadian politician

Bill Bonko Sr.
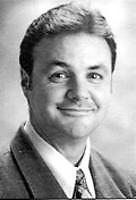

Member of the Legislative Assembly of Alberta
- In office November 22, 2004 – March 3, 2008
- Preceded by: New district
- Succeeded by: Janice Sarich
- Constituency: Edmonton-Decore

Trustee on Edmonton Public School Board (Ward A)
- In office October 16, 1995 – October 18, 2004
- Preceded by: New ward
- Succeeded by: Bev Esslinger

Personal details
- Party: Liberal
- Spouse: Michele
- Children: Two
- Occupation: Circulation manager

Bill Bonko is a Canadian politician and former member of the Legislative Assembly of Alberta. He was first elected in the 2004 election as a Liberal in Edmonton Decore, but was defeated in his 2008 re-election bid by Progressive Conservative Janice Sarich.

== Early life ==
Bill Bonko graduated from Queen Elizabeth High School. He worked for fifteen years as the circulation manager for the Edmonton Journal.

== Political career ==
Bonko first sought political office in the 1995 municipal election, when he was elected to the Board of Edmonton Public Schools as trustee for Ward A. He was re-elected in the 1998 and 2001 elections. He did not seek re-election at the conclusion of his third term. Instead, he ran for the Legislative Assembly of Alberta in Edmonton Decore in the 2004 provincial election as a Liberal. He won 44.63% of the vote and defeated his opponents, who included former MLA Walter Szwender who was running for the Progressive Conservatives and Gary Masyk, an incumbent MLA whose riding had been abolished and who had crossed the floor to become the Alberta Alliance's first MLA after being elected as PC. He did not sponsor any bills during his time in the legislature, and was defeated by Progressive Conservative candidate Janice Sarich in the 2008 election.

== Personal life ==
Bonko is married to Michele; the pair has two children, including Bill Jr. who ran as a Liberal candidate in Athabasca-Redwater in the 2008 provincial election.

== Election results ==
2008 Election Results (Edmonton Decore)		Turnout 35.1%	
Affiliation	Candidate	Votes	%
Progressive Conservative	Janice Sarich	4,602	45.93%
Liberal	Bill Bonko	3,879	38.72%
NDP	Sidney Sadik	1,295	12.93%
Green	Trey Capenhurst	243	2.43%
2004 Election Results (Edmonton Decore)		Turnout 43.4%	
Affiliation	Candidate	Votes	%
Liberal	Bill Bonko	4,418	44.63%
Progressive Conservative	Walter Szwender	3,033	30.63%
NDP	Shirley Barg	1,524	15.40%
Alberta Alliance	Gary Masyk	830	8.39%
Social Credit	Geoffrey Chevrier	94	0.95%
2001 Edmonton municipal election results (Public School Trustee, Ward A)
Candidate		Votes	%
Bill Bonko		6,769	62.1%
Bev Esslinger		4,136	37.9%
1998 Edmonton municipal election results (Public School Trustee, Ward A)
Candidate		Votes	%
Bill Bonko		4,867	48.3%
Bev Esslinger		3,325	33.0%
Lynette Young		1,883	18.7%
1995 Edmonton municipal election results (Public School Trustee, Ward A)
Candidate		Votes	%
Bill Bonko		4,480	33.5%
Maureen Ford		2,441	18.2%
Cathy Kutryk		2,175	16.3%
Joe Hak		1,933	14.5%
Larry Phillips		800	6.0%
Perry Dane		565	4.2%
Victor Varvis		559	4.2%
Dan McAra		428	3.2%
