= Bill Whatcott =

Canadian social conservative activist (born 1967)

- Born: 16 October 1967 (age 59); Toronto, Ontario, Canada
- Education: Humber College
- Known for: Anti-abortion, anti-homosexual, and anti-trans activism

William Gary Whatcott (born 16 October 1967) is a Canadian social conservative activist who campaigns against homosexuality, trans people, and abortion. His activities have attracted attention from the media, including being interviewed on The Daily Show. He has also run for political office in Toronto, Saskatchewan and Edmonton.

== Biography ==
Whatcott was born in Toronto, Ontario and spent his youth in a number of foster homes. At the age of 14 he went to live on the street. At age 18 he reports having found God, who transformed his life. Later he moved to Saskatchewan, where he worked at a Salvation Army senior home before beginning employment for the Regina Health District.

Whatcott wrote an autobiography detailing his childhood, conversion, activism and journey to the Supreme Court of Canada called Born in a Graveyard.

== Activism ==
In Regina he expanded his public campaign against abortion and homosexuality, with his goal to make both activities illegal. One of his most notable activities has been to travel to different Canadian cities and place graphic flyers in mailboxes. These include flyers with images of dismembered fetuses and flyers with pictures of diseases allegedly caused by gay sex. He has also protested at gay pride celebrations and outside abortion clinics. On occasion he has also taken up other causes, including distributing flyers describing Muhammad as "a man of violence" with images of a beheaded Indonesian girl. In 2001 he held a Heterosexual Pride Day parade in Regina. After the event turned out to be focused on anti-homosexual displays and speeches the city did not approve the event in subsequent years. The graphic nature of his literature, and his protests have gotten him in repeated legal trouble. He has been arrested six times in Saskatchewan, but never convicted of any charge. He has also been arrested once in the United States and 20 times in Ontario and successfully prosecuted twice for violating the bubble zone, an injunction which bars all prayers and protests from within 60 feet (18 m) of the abortion clinic. On Sept 2 1994, he was convicted the first time for his activism, receiving a six-month stint in jail for violating the bubble zones around Scott's abortion clinic in Toronto by protesting at the clinic's entrance.

In 2005, he was fined $17,500 by the Saskatchewan Human Rights Tribunal for distributing material deemed hateful by the Human Rights Tribunal. His activities were investigated by the Edmonton police, for what one constable called an "affront on the basic tenets of our society," but no charges were laid.

He has also repeatedly run for political office. In the 1999 Ontario election he ran for the Family Coalition Party in the riding of Toronto Centre, finishing eighth with 232 votes. In 2000 he ran for mayor of Regina, finishing fourth of eight with 344 votes. In 2007 he ran for mayor of Edmonton finishing sixth of nine with 1665 votes. He was also a frequent contributor to the conservative website Free Dominion, from which he was eventually banned.

In 2002 Whatcott was interviewed by Ed Helms for The Daily Show. He appeared before the Supreme Court of Canada on 12 October 2011 to defend his views on homosexuality. As the judges and lawyers prepared to hear his case, he delivered 3,000 more flyers on homosexuality throughout Ottawa, including Carleton University Campus. More interveners appeared in Whatcott's case – 21 in total: 7 for and 14 against – than in any other Supreme Court case in the history of Canada.

A documentary was made on Whatcott's conversion to Christianity and his anti-abortion and anti-gay crusades, which have landed him in front of multiple courts, tribunals, and finally the Supreme Court of Canada. The film featured prominently at Ottawa's Free Thinking Film Festival on 12 November 2011.

In August 2014, Whatcott infiltrated the Vancouver Pride parade. He marched with the false alias of Matthew Davidson with the Church of the Flying Spaghetti Monster. He and his group handed out fake condoms which were actually leaflets with messages against homosexuality.

Whatcott has also appeared at several universities around Canada including the University of Calgary and the University of Regina where he was met with protest from students.

In 2017 Whatcott printed and handed out fliers with transphobic content against Morgane Oger who was running for provincial office. The B.C. Human Rights Tribunal would later order Whatcott to pay $55,000 to Oger as compensation.

== Nursing licence ==
On 25 January 2005, the Saskatchewan Association of Licensed Practical Nurses suspended Whatcott's nursing licence for 45 days and ordered him to pay $15,000 in legal costs. The Association's professional disciplinary body held that Whatcott had intimidated patients and staff outside a Regina Planned Parenthood clinic by picketing and referring "to its workers as murderers, abortionists and disseminators of AIDS". Whatcott stated that he was well within his rights of free speech as a private citizen to protest the clinic, as he was off duty and made no reference to his professional status. The Saskatchewan Court of Queen's Bench dismissed his application and upheld the disciplinary ruling.

On appeal, the Saskatchewan Court of Appeal overturned the ruling by the King's Bench, holding that the decision of the disciplinary body infringed Whatcott's right to freedom of expression guaranteed by s. 2 of the Canadian Charter of Rights and Freedoms, and that the infringement could not be justified under s. 1 of the Charter. The Court of Appeal ordered that the Association pay Whatcott's legal costs. On 29 May 2008, the Supreme Court of Canada dismissed the Association's application for leave to appeal, without commenting on the legal issues raised by the case. According to Whatcott's lawyer, if the original ruling had stood, it could have affected other professionals, such as lawyers or teachers, who take unpopular views.

== Pamphletting case ==
On 25 February 2010, Whatcott had the Saskatchewan Human Rights Tribunal ruling against him alleging discrimination against four gay men and fining him $17,500 overturned by the Saskatchewan Court of Appeal. Part of the judgment acquitting Whatcott read, "the manner in which children in the public school system are to be exposed to messages about different forms of sexuality and sexual identity is inherently controversial. It must always be open to public debate. That debate will sometimes be polemical and impolite."

The Saskatchewan Human Rights Commission appealed to the Supreme Court of Canada, which decided to hear the case.

Whatcott appeared before the Supreme Court of Canada on 12 October 2011 to defend his views on homosexuality. While the judges and lawyers were preparing to hear Whatcott's case, the activist delivered 3,000 more flyers on homosexuality throughout Ottawa and got thrown off the Carleton University campus for delivering the flyers there. More interveners appeared in Whatcott's case both for and against him, than in any other Supreme Court case in the history of Canada. Intervening on behalf of Whatcott were the Canadian Constitution Foundation, the Canadian Civil Liberties Association, Canadian Journalists for Free Expression, the Christian Legal Fellowship, the Evangelical Fellowship of Canada, the Catholic Civil Rights League and the Faith + Freedom Alliance. Intervening against Whatcott were Attorney General of Alberta, Canadian Human Rights Commission, Alberta Human Rights Commission, Egale Canada Inc., Ontario Human Rights Commission, Canadian Jewish Congress, Unitarian Congregation of Saskatoon and Canadian Unitarian Council, Women's Legal Education and Action Fund, Canadian Bar Association, Northwest Territories Human Rights Commission and Yukon Human Rights Commission, League for Human Rights of B'nai B'rith Canada, United Church of Canada, Assembly of First Nations, Federation of Saskatchewan Indian Nations and Métis Nation-Saskatchewan and the African Canadian Legal Clinic.

In February 2013, the Court released its reasons in Saskatchewan Human Rights Commission v Whatcott. The Court held that, although Bible passages, biblical beliefs and the principles derived from those beliefs can be legally and reasonably advanced in public discourse, speech which can be described as "detestation" and "vilification" cannot be. Whatcott was ordered to pay compensation to recipients of the flyers.

== CBC lawsuit ==
Whatcott sued the Canadian Broadcasting Corporation over an October 2011 broadcast that included a 2008 flyer with the words "kill the homosexuals" highlighted. Whatcott argued the flyer had nothing to do with the Supreme Court case being discussed by the broadcast (which involved flyers from 2000 and 2001) and that the phrase had been taken out of context (which included a disclaimer on the reverse saying no violence was being advocated). Whatcott initially won the defamation case in the Saskatchewan Court of King's Bench, with the trial judge ruling that the CBC had displayed actual malice towards Whatcott. The trial judge awarded CBC to pay general damages of $20,000 to Whatcott, as well as aggravated damages of $10,000, and court costs. CBC appealed the decision to the Saskatchewan Court of Appeal. In November 2015, the Court of Appeal ruled mainly in CBC's favour, finding that there was no basis for a finding of malice. The Court of Appeal set aside both damages awards and instead awarded nominal damages of $1,000 to Whatcott, but court costs to CBC.

== Toronto Pride Parade ==
In 2016, Whatcott and others infiltrated the Toronto Pride Parade disguised as "gay zombies" wearing green body-suits under the alias of the "Cannabis Consumers' Association". They distributed flyers disguised as "safe sex" packages. The flyers contained graphic depictions of sexually transmitted infections and claimed that gay sex puts people at risk of these infections. They also criticized politicians of the Liberal Party, including Justin Trudeau and Kathleen Wynne, for their support of gay activism, and encouraged readers to repent of homosexuality.

In response, a lawyer named Douglas Elliott began a class action against Whatcott seeking damages of $104 million for alleged defamation against the LGBT community, and members of the Liberal Parties of Ontario and Canada. The class action was settled out of court.

In June 2018, Toronto police charged Whatcott under s. 319(2) of the Criminal Code for his actions in the parade and issued an arrest warrant. Whatcott turned himself in to police in Calgary. After a trial in the Ontario Superior Court, Whatcott was acquitted in December 2021. The Crown appealed that decision to the Ontario Court of Appeal. In 2023, the Court of Appeal allowed the Crown's appeal and ordered a new trial. He was found guilty in September 2026, with a sentencing hearing scheduled to be held in December.
