= Ben Henderson (politician) =

Canadian politician (born 1957)

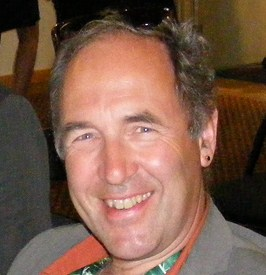

Edmonton City Councillor Ward 8
- In office 2010 – October 18, 2021
- Preceded by: New ward

Edmonton City Councillor Ward 4
- In office 2007–2010
- Preceded by: Michael Phair
- Succeeded by: Ward abolished

Personal details
- Born: November 13, 1957 (age 68) New York City, New York, U.S.
- Party: Liberal
- Spouse: Laurie Blakeman
- Occupation: Theatre director and Mediator

Ben Henderson (born November 13, 1957) is a former member of the Edmonton City Council, where he represented Ward 8.

He was a candidate in the 2001 municipal election and 2004 municipal election and gained his seat on City Council in the 2007 municipal election, following Michael Phair's retirement.

He is married to former Edmonton-Centre Liberal MLA, Laurie Blakeman.

Henderson was the Liberal Candidate for Edmonton Mill Woods in the 2021 Canadian Federal Election. He came second to incumbent Tim Uppal.

== Electoral history ==
2021 Canadian federal election
Party	Candidate	Votes	%	±%
Conservative	Tim Uppal	18,392	37.9%	
Liberal	Ben Henderson	16,499	34.0%	
New Democratic	Nigel Logan	10,553	21.8%	
People's	Paul Edward McCormack	2,898	6.0%	
Communist	Naomi Rankin	172	0.4%	
Total valid votes		48,514		
Total rejected ballots		380		
Turnout				
Eligible voters				
Source: Elections Canada
