= Tooker Gomberg =

Canadian environmental activist

- Born: August 12, 1955; Montreal, Quebec, Canada
- Died: March 4, 2004 (aged 48); Halifax, Nova Scotia, Canada
- Education: Hampshire College
- Occupation: Environmental Activist
- Political party: New Democratic Party
- Spouse: Angela Bischoff

Richard Daniel “Tooker” Gomberg (August 12, 1955 – March 4, 2004) was a Canadian politician and environmental activist. A native of Montreal, Quebec, a graduate of Herzliah High School and a liberal-arts graduate of Hampshire College (1980), Gomberg founded one of Canada's first curbside recycling programs in Montreal, and later moved to Edmonton, Alberta, where he created educational materials for Alberta's energy ministry and headed the EcoCity Society, an environmental agency. He served on the Edmonton city council from 1992 to 1995.

== Political career ==
In 1992, he was elected to Edmonton's city council. In 1995 he ran for re-election but was not elected. It is said his support for high-density development of the Little Brickyard in his home base of Riverdale lost him support among many of the people there. His stand was in line with his belief in built-up, not sprawling, urban centres.

He ran for the position of Mayor in the 1998 municipal election, placing fourth with 15 percent of the vote.

In 1997, he was the New Democratic Party candidate for the Montreal riding of Outremont.

=== Toronto mayoralty run ===
Gomberg then moved to Toronto, Ontario, where he ran for mayor in the 2000 municipal election. He received over 51,000 votes, but finished a distant second behind Mel Lastman who garnered over 80 per cent of the vote.

The campaign was nonetheless influential. Gomberg had been endorsed by urban guru Jane Jacobs, a longtime and influential resident of Toronto's Annex neighbourhood. Some of Gomberg's platform included advocacy of provincial powers for Toronto and tolls for downtown traffic, policies that re-emerged in the successful 2003 campaign of David Miller.

In the last days of the 2000 campaign, Lastman appeared with Canadian PM Jean Chrétien to promise nearly one billion dollars in social housing funding. After winning, one of Lastman's first acts was to appoint Jane Jacobs to the city's Charter Committee, which was seeking additional powers for the city (taking them from the province of Ontario). Both moves were generally attributed to the need to respond to Gomberg's insurgent campaign.

== Media ==
While in Toronto, Gomberg also hosted Eco-Freako, a webcast TV show. It ran for ten episodes.

== Activism and arrests ==
Gomberg was often controversial as an environmental activist, being arrested numerous times.

In June 2000, he was arrested at the World Petroleum Congress protests in Calgary. A protest march took him by the Suncor building, which was a violation of terms from an arrest at a Suncor protest in Northern Alberta. He was held for a couple of hours, then released. His was one of only three arrests at the WPC protests - the others being a street youth with outstanding warrants, and a woman who, when leaving the convergence centre was followed by police for several kilometers, stopped, and arrested for traffic violations.

He locked himself in a safe in Alberta premier Ralph Klein's constituency office as a protest against the province's stance on Kyoto.

He was also arrested in the Netherlands after breaking into the Volkel NATO Air Force base with 9 other anti-nuclear activists working to expose the presence of nuclear weapons in that country.

== Death ==
On Thursday, March 4, 2004, Gomberg was reported missing to police, who later stated that he appeared to have jumped off the middle of the Angus L. Macdonald Bridge, in Halifax, Nova Scotia, in the early hours of the morning. He had left his partner a suicide note stating that he had "lost his chutzpah" and his bicycle and helmet were found on the bridge. His body was never found.

His partner, Angela Bischoff, suspects that his use of the antidepressant Remeron may have led to his decision to commit suicide. Gomberg had become increasingly agitated in his final weeks and his Remeron dosage had been increased to the maximum amount two days before his death. Three weeks later, U.S. Food and Drug Administration issued stronger warnings about a link between antidepressants and the risk of suicide, particularly in the weeks after a patient starts treatment or their dosage is increased. Health Canada later followed suit, and as of 2005, Remeron was listed in Health Canada's adverse drug reaction database.

Toronto activists advocated the establishment of a major East-West Bike lane, to be called the "Tooker", on Bloor Street, to honour the life of Tooker Gomberg.

Tooker Gomberg's brother Ben is, as of summer 2009, the head of the Chicago Department of Transportation's Bike (bicycle) Program.
