= Jane Batty =

Canadian politician (born 1946)

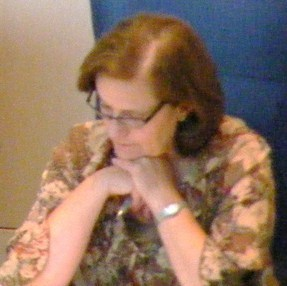

Edmonton City Councillor Ward 6
- In office 2010–2013
- Preceded by: New ward
- Succeeded by: Scott McKeen

Edmonton City Councillor Ward 4
- In office 2001–2010
- Preceded by: Jim Taylor
- Succeeded by: Ward abolished

Personal details
- Born: 1946 (age 79–80) Edmonton, Alberta
- Children: Judy; Jennifer
- Occupation: Businesswoman

Jane Batty (born 1946 in Edmonton, Alberta) is a former member of Edmonton City Council, last representing Ward 6. She was first elected in the 2001 Edmonton municipal election. She served on council to 2013.

Prior to her first term on council, Batty served as both a management consultant and vice-president at Denny Andrew's Ford in Edmonton. Before finally achieving political success Batty endured several failed campaigns for election to council; in 1998 she ran in Ward 5 and in 1992 she failed to edge past Michael Phair and Tooker Gomberg in Ward 4.

Batty announced on June 3, 2013, that she would retire at the end of her term, in October 2013.
