= Bill Smith (Alberta politician) =

Canadian businessman and politician

33rd Mayor of Edmonton
- In office October 16, 1995 – October 26, 2004
- Preceded by: Jan Reimer
- Succeeded by: Stephen Mandel

Personal details
- Born: December 11, 1934 (age 91) Edmonton, Alberta, Canada
- Spouse: Marlene Trudel
- Children: 4
- Profession: Businessman
- Football career

No. 78
- Positions: End, Defensive back

Personal information
- Listed height: 6 ft 1 in (1.85 m)
- Listed weight: 185 lb (84 kg)

Career history
- 1956–1963: Edmonton Eskimos

Awards and highlights
- Grey Cup champion (1956); CFL West All-Star (1960)

William Smith (born December 11, 1934) is a Canadian businessman, former politician, and former professional football player. Smith was a mayor of Edmonton, Alberta from 1995 until 2004. Smith was a Grey Cup champion with the Edmonton Eskimos.

Smith was born in Edmonton, Alberta. Smith played for the Eskimos from 1956 to 1963 as a defensive back. Smith was named a West All-Star in 1960.

Smith was first elected in 1995 when he defeating incumbent Mayor Jan Reimer and was re-elected in 1998 and 2001. As mayor, Smith was known as "Booster Bill" for promoting Edmonton as the "Greatest City in the Greatest Province in the Greatest Country." During his term in office, Smith is credited with being instrumental in bringing the IAAF World Championships in Athletics, the Juno Awards and the World Masters Games to Edmonton.

Smith was defeated by Councillor Stephen Mandel in the 2004 Edmonton municipal election.

After his mayoralty ended, Smith became a director of BioNeutra, a producer of VitaFiber, a natural fiber-based food sweetener. Smith is also a director of Imperial Equities.

Preceded by Jan Reimer	Mayor of Edmonton; 1995–2004	Succeeded by Stephen Mandel
