= Stephen Mandel =

Canadian politician (born 1945)

The Honourable Stephen Mandel AOE ECA
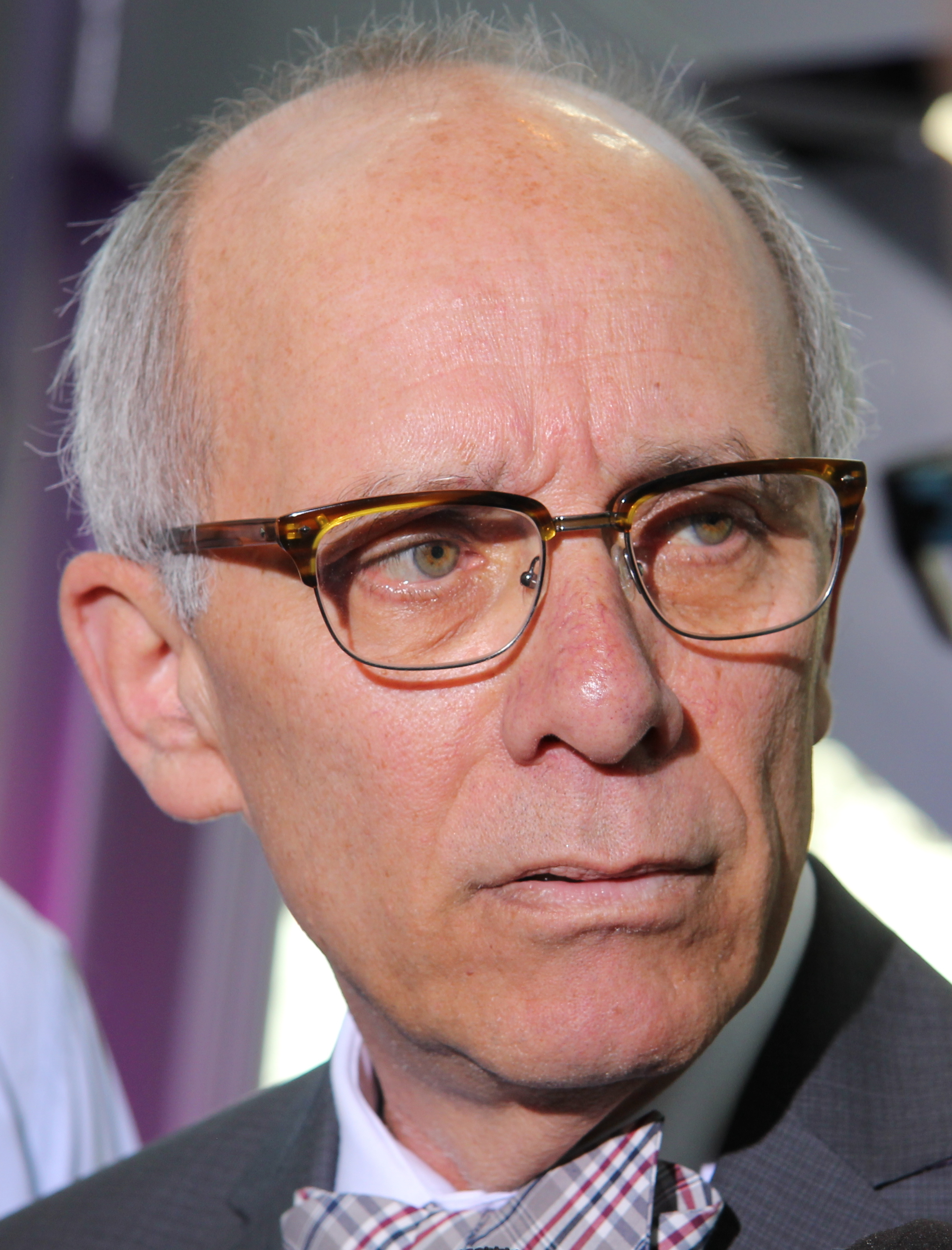
- Mandel in 2013

Leader of the Alberta Party
- In office February 27, 2018 – June 30, 2019
- Preceded by: Greg Clark
- Succeeded by: Jacquie Fenske (interim)

Minister of Health
- In office September 15, 2014 – May 24, 2015
- Premier: Jim Prentice
- Preceded by: Fred Horne
- Succeeded by: Sarah Hoffman (Health and Seniors)

34th Mayor of Edmonton
- In office October 26, 2004 – October 29, 2013
- Preceded by: Bill Smith
- Succeeded by: Don Iveson
Parliamentary constituencies
Member of the Legislative Assembly of Alberta for Edmonton-Whitemud
In office October 27, 2014 – May 5, 2015
Preceded by	Dave Hancock
Succeeded by	Bob Turner
Member of the Edmonton City Council for Ward 1
In office October 23, 2001 – October 26, 2004 Serving with Karen Leibovici
Preceded by	Leroy Chahley
Succeeded by	Linda Sloan

Personal details
- Born: July 18, 1945 (age 81) Windsor, Ontario, Canada
- Party: Alberta Party (2018–present)
- Other political affiliations: Progressive Conservative (until 2017)
- Spouse: Lynn Mandel
- Education: Lincoln College (AA); Miami University (BS); University of Windsor
- Profession: Businessman

Stephen Mandel AOE ECA (born July 18, 1945) is a Canadian politician who served as mayor of Edmonton from 2004 to 2013, as Alberta's Minister of Health from 2014 to 2015, and as leader of the Alberta Party from 2018 to 2019. Before becoming mayor, he was a city councillor for three years.

On September 15, 2014, he was made Minister of Health by premier Jim Prentice, despite not holding a seat in the Legislative Assembly of Alberta. He was subsequently named as the Alberta Progressive Conservative Party's candidate in a by-election in Edmonton-Whitemud, the seat formerly held by Dave Hancock, which was scheduled for October 27, 2014. He won in the byelection but was subsequently defeated in the general election on May 5, 2015.

Mandel announced his candidacy for the leadership of the Alberta Party on January 10, 2018. He was elected on February 27, 2018, defeating two other candidates. Mandel resigned as Alberta Party leader in June 2019. Mandel was made a member of the Alberta Order of Excellence in 2024.

== Background ==
Mandel received an associate of arts degree from Lincoln College in Lincoln, Illinois, a bachelor of science in business administration from Miami University, and his masters in political science from the University of Windsor.

He moved to Edmonton in 1972 from Windsor, Ontario.

Mandel owned Strathcona County's Lakeland Village mobile home park up until 2023 when he sold to American Company Harmony Communities.

== Entry into politics ==
Prior to being elected to city council, Mandel ran unsuccessfully for school trustee He was first elected to the Edmonton City Council in 2001 as a councillor for Ward 1. In 2004, he became mayor by defeating Edmonton's three-term mayor, Bill Smith. Mandel credits his successes to the hard work and spirit of cooperation of his council. Mandel left office as Mayor of Edmonton on October 29, 2013.

== Mayor of Edmonton ==
=== Public works ===
Mandel's city council was responsible for many infrastructural changes, some controversial: expansion of the LRT lines, the construction of a new arena for the Edmonton Oilers.

After years of public consultations since 2008, the city approved a plan to gradually decommission the City Centre airport by implementing the City Centre Redevelopment Plan. The City Centre Redevelopment Plan aims to mitigate urban sprawl by redeveloping the aging and costly City Centre Airport into the sustainable-300 acre inner city neighbourhood of Blatchford, which is anticipated to accommodate 30,000 residents.

According to sporting organization 'SportAccord', the city has a Silver class partnership with the convention, enabling Edmonton to host many world classed events awarded during the Mandel administration. The city is one of six host cities of the 2015 FIFA Women's World Cup.

Mandel committed to reversing the tendency towards declining investment and architectural standards in Edmonton's public buildings, declaring that "our tolerance for crap is now zero." During his mayoral tenure, Edmonton reinstated the role of City Architect and hired Carol Bélanger, who redesigned the procurement process for public buildings.

==== Edmonton Downtown arena ====
Edmonton Oilers CEO Daryl Katz has entered into an agreement with the city of Edmonton to joint finance the construction of a new arena for the hockey team which the city will own. The entertainment complex, arena and plaza along with neighbourhood development, and adjacent Winter Garden LRT Station costing $35M has an estimated budget of $601 Million CAD. The project will be financed between the city with a seed fund valued at $219M CAD. Katz Group will contribute $143M and invest in the neighbouring land development. The Albertan government won't fund the arena as Mandel anticipated however the provincial government inadvertently funded $170M through the Municipal Sustainability Initiative. $125M will be raised through ticket surcharges.

=== Social and business initiatives ===
Responding to an upsurge of domestic spousal violence in 2006, Mandel together with the Alberta Council for Women's Shelters hosted the first 'Breakfast with guys' peace seminar aimed at curbing violence. The event inspired Edmonton's business leaders raise awareness and support among their staff and community. This initiative has since been replicated globally.

To address the needs of Edmonton's Aboriginal community the city conducted the 'Edmonton Urban Aboriginal Accord Initiative Project', many important documents and agreements with Treaty 6 natives, 'as an accord between Edmonton and the Aboriginal community' were written.

In 2011 Mandel commissioned the 'Community Sustainability Task Force', to address problems that mature Edmontonian neighborhoods faced. The organization reported on recommendations through the 'ELEVATE' report.

Mandel negotiated with the county of Leduc to amalgamate, 15,600 Acres of land to be used to support Edmonton's anticipated growth, if approved it will be the first major growth since 1982.

IBM granted 400,000 USD worth of expertise and advice to assist local experts in improving the lives of Edmontonians through the effective use of data and technology, listing the city as a 2011 Smart Cities Challenge winner.

In 2012, Mandel embarked on a trade mission to meet business and municipal leaders from Asia, to assert Edmonton's place in global Energy and business trade.

=== Events during mayoralty ===
In 2013, city council approved to support the UofA as home of the Canadian Women's Basketball team, the city will grant 500,000 CAD over 4 years to develop the sport such as introducing youth to the game.

The city of Edmonton and the aboriginals Treaty 6 commenced on a dialog to address the needs of Aboriginal Edmontonians. In 2005 the two parties signed with the Edmonton Urban Aboriginal Accord.

Mandel started the first Mayor Pride Brunch, in 2005. The event is a fund raiser to raise money for gay pride youth Camp fYrefly. Mandel proclaimed a week in April 2013 as Transgender Awareness week to bring awareness of the challenges Transgender Edmontonians face such as violence.

In 2006–2011 the city administration has been criticized by some members of the local press on issues relating to infrastructure maintenance.

In September 2007, Mandel ordered the removal from city property of work by Edmonton sculptor Ryan McCourt, after receiving a 700-name petition that alleged McCourt's sculptures had "hurt Hindu religious sensibilities".

Mandel created the Mayor's Evening for the Arts held at the Francis Winspear Centre, out of formerly a luncheon event to an annual festive evening gala. The event showcases the talents of Edmontonian performing artists in a grand spectacle and awards ceremony. In 2012, he celebrated the 25th Anniversary of this tradition. In 2013, Mandel created the 'Ambassador of the Arts Award' awarded at the gala. Honouring significant contributions by individuals or corporations who represented Edmonton artistically on the international or national stage.

Mandel proclaimed the Edmonton Public Library's centennial anniversary to be 'Edmonton Public Library Day' issuing free library membership.

=== City charter ===
To address the challenges of evolving into metropolises, Mandel, together with Calgary Mayor Naheed Nenshi, negotiated a memorandum of understanding with the Alberta government. This motion will enable both mayors to work with the Alberta government to draft city charters in 2013, effectively articulating the powers and responsibilities the municipalities have to deal with unique issues of development such as taxation.

== Provincial politics ==
Mandel was named as Minister of Health by Alberta premier Jim Prentice in the fall of 2014. Two months later, he would win the seat vacated by Dave Hancock (Edmonton-Whitemud) in a by-election. He went on to serve as health minister and MLA until the defeat of the Progressive Conservatives, and the loss of his own seat to NDP candidate Bob Turner, in the 2015 election.

Mandel announced his candidacy for the leadership of the Alberta Party on January 10, 2018, and was elected Leader of the Alberta Party on February 27, 2018, with 66% of the vote, succeeding Greg Clark. He secured the Alberta Party's nomination to be the candidate in Edmonton-McClung on May 12, 2018.

On February 8, 2019 Mandel's name was added to an Elections Alberta list of politicians deemed Ineligible to run as candidates or serve as Chief Financial Officers in provincial elections. He was given a five year ban for having missed a deadline for filing a financial campaign return for his 2018 nomination campaign. The Elections Alberta deputy chief electoral officer stated that candidates have four months from the time they are nominated to file financial campaign returns. Mandel stated that "there is confusion about the actual due dates this paperwork is due to Elections Alberta. Because the penalties for late filing are so serious, we have also applied to the Court of Queen's Bench to review and rule on this matter as soon as possible" and "we believe we have filed within the required deadline". On March 4, 2019, the 5 year ban was lifted after the Court of Queen's Bench ruled that a 5 year ban was an inappropriate penalty for a missed deadline, in this case.

== Electoral Results ==
=== 2004 Edmonton municipal election ===
Mayor
Candidate	Votes	%
Stephen Mandel	85,887	40.68%
Bill Smith	68,767	32.57%
Robert Noce	52,640	24.93%
Tilo Paravalos	921	0.44%
Dieter Peske	905	0.43%
Dave Dowling	858	0.41%
Thomas "Buffalo Terminator" Tomilson	768	0.36%
Jean-Paul Noujaim	390	0.18%

=== 2007 Edmonton municipal election ===
Mayor
Candidate	Votes	%
Stephen Mandel	98,751	65.80%
Don Koziak	38,027	25.34%
Dave Dowling	2,690	1.79%
George Lam	2,647	1.76%
Dustin Becker	2,568	1.71%
Bill Whatcott	1,665	1.11%
Peter T. Lefaivre	1,413	0.94%
Robert (Bob) Ligertwood	1,235	0.82%
Khaled Kheireddine	1,089	0.73%

=== 2010 Edmonton municipal election ===
Mayor
Candidate	Votes	%
Stephen Mandel	109,432	55.2
David Dorward	58,856	29.7
Daryl Bonar	20,672	10.4
Dan Dromarsky	4,621	2.3
Dave Dowling	2,295	1.2
Andrew Lineker	1,131	0.6
Bob Ligertwood	1,129	0.6

=== Edmonton-Whitemud by-election, 2014 ===
Alberta provincial by-election, October 27, 2014: Edmonton-Whitemud Resignation of Dave Hancock on September 25, 2014
Party	Candidate	Votes	%	±%
Progressive Conservative	Stephen Mandel	6,003	42.39	-17.85
New Democratic	Bob Turner	3,150	22.24	13.24
Wildrose	Tim Grover	2,680	18.92	2.72
Liberal	Donna Wilson	2,033	14.35	2.39
Alberta Party	Will Munsey	202	1.43	-0.92
Green	René Malenfant	95	0.67	—
Total		14,163	—	—
Rejected, spoiled and declined		14	11	17
Eligible electors / turnout		35,795	39.36	-19.67
Progressive Conservative hold		Swing		-15.54
Source(s) Alberta. Chief Electoral Officer (2015). Report on the October 27, 2014 By-elections in: Calgary-Elbow, Calgary-Foothills, Calgary-West, Edmonton-Whitemud (PDF) (Report). Edmonton: Legislative Assembly of Alberta; Chief Electoral Officer. ISBN 978-098653678-6.

=== 2015 Alberta general election ===
2015 Alberta general election: Edmonton-Whitemud
Party	Candidate	Votes	%	±%
New Democratic	Bob Turner	12,805	57.45%	35.21%
Progressive Conservative	Stephen Mandel	7,177	32.20%	-10.19%
Wildrose	Chad Peters	1,423	6.38%	-12.94%
Liberal	Steven Townsend	629	2.82%	-11.53%
Green	Kathryn Jackson	182	0.82%	0.15%
Independent	John Baloun	73	0.33%	–
Total		22,289	–	–
Rejected, spoiled and declined		57	45	11
Eligible electors / turnout		37,018	60.39%	21.03%
New Democratic gain from Progressive Conservative		Swing		22.70%
Source(s) Source: "46 - Edmonton-Whitemud, 2015 Alberta general election". officialresults.elections.ab.ca. Elections Alberta. Chief Electoral Officer (2016). 2015 General Election. A Report of the Chief Electoral Officer (PDF) (Report). Edmonton, Alta.: Elections Alberta. pp. 254–258.

=== 2018 Alberta Party leadership election ===
Candidate	Votes	Percentage
Stephen Mandel	3,046	66.03%
Kara Levis	838	18.17%
Rick Fraser	729	15.80%
Total	4,613	100%

=== 2019 general election ===
2019 Alberta general election: Edmonton-McClung
Party	Candidate	Votes	%	±%
New Democratic	Lorne Dach	8,073	43.63%	-11.73%
United Conservative	Laurie Mozeson	6,640	35.89%	-4.00%
Alberta Party	Stephen Mandel	3,601	19.46%	14.71%
Alberta Advantage	Gordon Perrott	188	1.02%	–
Total		18,502	–	–
Rejected, spoiled and declined		109	47	12
Eligible electors / turnout		28,961	64.30%	10.25%
New Democratic hold		Swing		-10.84%
Source(s) Source: "36 - Edmonton-McClung, 2019 Alberta general election". officialresults.elections.ab.ca. Elections Alberta. Alberta. Chief Electoral Officer (2019). 2019 General Election. A Report of the Chief Electoral Officer. Volume II (PDF) (Report). Vol. 2. Edmonton, Alta.: Elections Alberta. pp. 140–143. ISBN 978-1-988620-12-1.
