= Bryan Anderson (Canadian politician) =

Canadian politician (1942–2020)

Edmonton City Councillor Ward 9
- In office 2010–2017
- Preceded by: New ward
- Succeeded by: Tim Cartmell

Edmonton City Councillor Ward 5
- In office 1998–2010
- Preceded by: Brent Maitson
- Succeeded by: Ward abolished

Personal details
- Born: July 5, 1942 Balcarres, Saskatchewan, Canada
- Died: September 4, 2020 (aged 78) Edmonton, Alberta, Canada
- Children: Four daughters
- Education: University of Saskatchewan
- Occupation: Teacher

Bryan Kent Anderson (July 5, 1942 – September 4, 2020) was a Canadian politician in Edmonton, Alberta, Canada. He was first elected to the Edmonton City Council in 1998 representing Ward 5. He was re-elected in 2001, 2004, and 2007. In 2010 the wards were renumbered, and Anderson was re-elected to the new Ward 9 in 2010 and 2013.

Before entering politics Anderson was a high school football and basketball coach for 34 years. As head coach, Anderson brought his teams to 38 city finals and won about 20 championships. He was inducted into the Alberta Schools' Athletics Association hall of fame in April 2010 in honor of his high school coaching career.

As a city councillor Anderson pushed for the building of recreation centres, arenas, and other sports facilities to encourage a more active and healthy lifestyle for Edmonton residents. Not everyone agreed with Bryan Anderson's strong approach and promotion of city-use chemicals to control a wide-spread dandelion seed problem in Edmonton, a plant that later became protected from city spraying.

Anderson died in the morning of September 4, 2020 at the age of 78.
