= Linda Sloan =

Canadian politician

Member of the Edmonton City Council
- In office 2004–2013
- Preceded by: Stephen Mandel
- Succeeded by: Andrew Knack
- Constituency: Ward 1

Member of the Legislative Assembly of Alberta
- In office 1997–2001
- Succeeded by: Kevin Taft
- Constituency: Edmonton Riverview

Personal details
- Born: June 27, 1960 (age 66) Listowel, Ontario, Canada
- Party: Alberta Liberal Party
- Spouse: Husband
- Children: 2
- Education: University of Alberta
- Occupation: Nurse

Linda Sloan (born June 27, 1960) is a Canadian politician and municipal councillor in Edmonton, Alberta.

Sloan graduated from the Foothills Hospital School of Nursing in 1982 and began work as a registered nurse. She soon became involved in the Staff Nurses Associations of Alberta (which she led from 1992 until 1997), the National Federation of Nurses Unions, and the Alberta Association of Registered Nurses.

In 1997, she ran for the Legislative Assembly of Alberta in the riding of Edmonton Riverview as a candidate for the Liberal Party of Alberta. She defeated her closest rival, Progressive Conservative Gwen Harris by more than 900 votes.

While in the legislature, Sloan served as Liberal opposition critic for social services, child welfare, and disability programs. In this capacity, she supported extending adoption rights to same-sex couples and sponsored a private member's bill calling for the creation of a children's advocate who would report directly to the legislature.

When Liberal leader Grant Mitchell resigned in 1998, Sloan became one of four candidates to replace him. Nancy MacBeth won on the first ballot.

Sloan declined to seek re-election in 2001, and ran for city council in 2004. She finished second of nine candidates in Ward 1 (behind incumbent councillor and Sloan's former Liberal caucus colleague Karen Leibovici) and was elected. While on city council, she has served as councillor responsible for the Senior Citizens portfolio.

Linda Sloan is married with two children.
