= Ed Gibbons =

Canadian politician (born 1949)

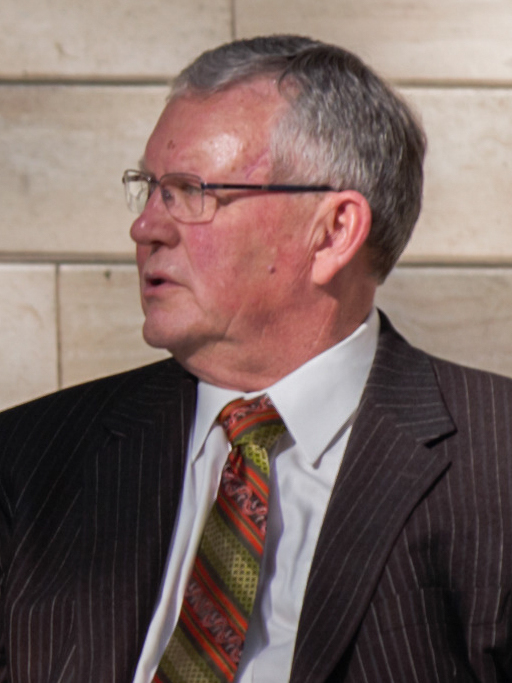
- Gibbons in 2016

Member of the Edmonton City Council
- In office 2010–2017
- Preceded by: New ward
- Succeeded by: Aaron Paquette
- Constituency: Ward 4
- In office 2001–2010
- Preceded by: Brian Mason
- Succeeded by: Ward abolished
- Constituency: Ward 3

Member of the Legislative Assembly of Alberta
- In office 1997–2001
- Preceded by: Peter Sekulic
- Succeeded by: Tony Vandermeer
- Constituency: Edmonton Manning

Personal details
- Born: March 1, 1949 (age 77) Edmonton, Alberta, Canada
- Party: Alberta Liberal Party
- Spouse: Carolyn Gibbons
- Children: Mark Gibbons; Darren Gibbons; Margo Gibbons
- Education: Northern Alberta Institute of Technology
- Occupation: Businessman

Edward A. Gibbons (born March 1, 1949) is a Canadian politician. He is a former municipal councilor of Edmonton and Member of the Legislative Assembly of Alberta.

Gibbons won election to the Legislature from Edmonton Manning in the 1997 Alberta general election, holding the riding for the Alberta Liberal Party. While in the Legislature, he served as Liberal opposition critic for Municipal Affairs, Gaming, and Government Affairs. In the 2001 provincial election, the runner-up from the previous election, Progressive Conservative Tony Vandermeer, defeated Gibbons.

In 2001, Gibbons won election to Edmonton's city council from Ward 3. He was re-elected in 2004, 2007, 2010, and 2013.
