= Dave Thiele =

Canadian politician

Edmonton City Councilor Ward 6
- In office 1998–2010
- Preceded by: Dick Mather
- Succeeded by: Ward abolished

Personal details
- Born: 1952 (age 73–74) unknown
- Spouse: Wife
- Children: 3
- Occupation: Treasurer

Dave Thiele (born c. 1952) is a Canadian politician. He was a member of the Edmonton City Council, representing Ward 6 alongside Amarjeet Sohi.

Thiele was first elected in 1998, prior to which he worked with the City of Edmonton in the Water Systems department (now Epcor Water).
