= 2006 Progressive Conservative Association of Alberta leadership election =

- Date: Nov 25, 2006 (1st ballot); Dec 2, 2006 (2nd & 3rd ballot)
- Resigning leader: Ralph Klein
- Won by: Ed Stelmach
- Ballots: 3
- Candidates: 8
- Entrance fee: $15,000
- Spending limit: None

The 2006 Alberta Progressive Conservative leadership election was held in November and December 2006 to choose a new leader for the Progressive Conservative Association of Alberta (and consequent Premier of Alberta) to replace the retiring Ralph Klein. Ed Stelmach emerged as the winner of an eight candidate field, despite placing third on the first ballot.

== Timing ==
=== Klein announces resignation date ===
On March 14, 2006, 16 days before the PC Convention and leadership review, Klein announced his plan to tender his resignation on October 31, 2007, but remain as premier for several months until a leadership election in early 2008. However, at a party convention March 31, he received only 55.4% support from party delegates, and consequently decided to submit his resignation September 20 and to leave office as soon as a successor was chosen.

=== Implications for Cabinet ministers ===
Shortly after announcing his timetable with regards to stepping down, the premier instructed all current members of the Albertan Cabinet to resign and move to the backbench by June 16, 2006, if they wanted to run for the leadership. Premier Klein's request is not unusual or unprecedented on his part - former Albertan Treasurer Stockwell Day was required to resign as treasurer upon declaring his candidacy for leadership of the Canadian Alliance in 2000. However, the lengthy notice Klein has demanded has proven controversial - after announcing his own resignation Klein's predecessor Don Getty also required cabinet ministers who wanted the leadership to resign, but Getty requested their resignations only a few months prior to the vote.

=== March 2006 leadership vote ===
On March 31, 2006, Premier Klein faced a mandatory leadership review when party delegates voted on the question of whether he should continue as leader of the party and, by extension, as premier. Although Klein was not widely expected to lose this vote, he had said he would resign leader quickly if he did not get an overwhelming majority. Klein had not publicly divulged what this threshold would be, but most political observers pegged it at 75%, far more than the 55.4% the premier actually received. In previous years, Klein had scored as high as 97% in support of his leadership.

There was known to be pressure from within the party to force Klein out sooner than planned. On March 23, 2006, Infrastructure and Transportation Minister Lyle Oberg was suspended from the party's legislative caucus for six months and dismissed from the Cabinet after he told constituents in Brooks that he would not urge delegates at the March 31 leadership review to support Klein. Oberg had been considered a contender for the leadership prior to this decision, but described the premier's directive regarding the June 1 deadline as a "bombshell" and infuriated fellow Tories when he told constituents "If I were the premier, I wouldn't want me sitting as a backbencher... I know where all the skeletons are." Despite this, Oberg pressed on with his leadership campaign and was re-admitted to caucus on July 25, 2006.

Political analysts believe the result of the March 31 vote can be attributed to concerns over how a "long goodbye" by a sitting premier can affect governing parties. There were still fresh memories across Canada of former Liberal Prime Minister Jean Chrétien's lengthy retirement notice and a belief that this delay was the cause of party infighting in 2004 followed by reduction to a minority government in the 2004 federal election and then defeat in the 2006 election. In addition, many Albertans believed that crucial and decisive actions would need to be taken in the coming months as a result of Alberta's booming economy and massive budgetary surplus, thus they believed it was not the time for a lame duck premier to remain in office. Even worse for some, Premier Klein's retirement plans, had they been carried out as intended, would inevitably have resulted in him appointing lame duck cabinet ministers who would replace the leadership candidates only to face probable removal from the Cabinet following the leadership vote.

== Format ==
The format for the 2006 election was identical to the previous leadership election held in 1992. It was a one-member-one-vote voting system in which the top three candidates from the first round were eligible to move on to a second round, in which preferential voting would be used should all three eligible candidates stay in the race. At least one polling station was placed in each of Alberta's 83 electoral divisions - larger rural districts had multiple polling stations. In 1992, third-place candidate Rick Orman dropped out, leaving two candidates in the race:Klein and future Liberal leader Nancy Betkowski. Klein then defeated Betkowski.

Compared to Canadian political parties in general, and especially governing parties, there were very few restrictions regarding membership and regarding eligibility to vote in a leadership election in Alberta's PC Party. First, Alberta PC party rules did not forbid members from holding membership in rival parties. Some other Alberta parties, notably the Liberals and New Democrats do forbid their members from being members of other parties although the Alberta Alliance removed a similar restriction, possibly in response to Ted Morton's PC leadership candidacy. Second and perhaps more significantly, the Progressive Conservatives, as in 1992, allowed anyone who wished to vote in the leadership election to purchase a five-dollar membership right up to the polling day—memberships were even available for purchase at the polling stations. This was very unusual in Canada—in fact no other major federal or provincial party is known to allow leadership voters to buy memberships on polling day. Even those parties that do not employ delegated leadership conventions and allow the general membership to vote for the leader usually have a deadline for purchasing memberships of no later than seven days prior to the vote.

The timing of the potential second ballot coincided with the start of the federal Liberal Party's leadership election.

== Declared candidates ==
In order to be a declared candidate, the candidate had to have their nomination papers filled out and returned to the party by October 16, 2006. Eight candidates were declared. Of the nine initial candidates, six were former members of the Alberta Cabinet. Three of the candidates were not current MLAs; however, Premier Klein announced he will resign as the MLA for Calgary Elbow when he resigns as premier, thus the new leader will have a vacant seat to contest in a by-election should he need one. In the order they filed their nomination papers, the candidates were:

=== Ed Stelmach ===
Ed Stelmach, the former Intergovernmental Affairs minister, announced his resignation from cabinet in accordance with Klein's directive. He was the first declared candidate. Website:

Supporters in caucus: 13 Pearl Calahasen, Ray Danyluk, Iris Evans, Hector Goudreau, George Groeneveld, LeRoy Johnson, Phil Klein, Mel Knight, Fred Lindsay, Luke Ouellette, Lloyd Snelgrove, Ed Stelmach, Ivan Strang.
Additional supporters in caucus after first ballot: 6 Guy Boutilier, Carol Haley, David Hancock, Doug Horner, Lyle Oberg, Mark Norris.

=== Lyle Oberg ===
Lyle Oberg, the former Transportation minister, had said he intended to resign from Cabinet by the June 1 deadline. However, as noted above Oberg was fired from Cabinet and suspended from Caucus on March 22, 2006. He pursued the leadership despite these events, and was re-admitted to caucus on July 25. Website: http://www.lyleoberg.com

Supporters in caucus: 3 Guy Boutilier, Hung Pham, Lyle Oberg.

=== Mark Norris ===
Mark Norris, a former MLA who became celebrated within the party when he defeated former Tory leadership candidate-turned-Liberal leader Nancy MacBeth in Edmonton McClung in 2001. However, Norris lost his seat in the 2004 election to Liberal candidate Mo Elsalhy. Website: https://web.archive.org/web/20060613190856/http://marknorris.ca/

Supporters in caucus: 2 Carol Haley, Doug Horner.

=== Ted Morton ===
Ted Morton was first elected to the Alberta legislature in the 2004 Alberta general election. He had previously served as a professor in the political science department of the University of Calgary where he was considered to be member of the conservative Calgary School of professors. Morton served a six-year term as a senator-in-waiting between 1998 and 2004 after he was elected by Albertans in the 1998 Alberta Senate nominee election and used this position to advocate for democratic reform. Although Ted Morton was a backbencher, he was considered a strong contender for the leadership because of his high profile in the former Reform Party and Canadian Alliance. Morton was considered to be on the right of the political spectrum, and supported allowing people to pay for non-emergency health care services such as hip and knee replacements. Ted Morton also presented a private members bill in the Alberta legislature which would have allowed marriage commissioners who objected to same-sex marriage to opt out of performing same-sex marriages. Morton became one of two senators-in-waiting chosen by Albertans in a 1998 election. Website: https://web.archive.org/web/20050422165319/http://www.tedmorton.ca/

Supporters in caucus: 2 Ted Morton, Hung Pham
Supporters in Alberta Alliance caucus: 1 Paul Hinman
Supporters in Federal Conservative caucus: 3 Rob Anders, Myron Thompson, Jason Kenney.

=== Dave Hancock ===
David Hancock, former Advanced Education Minister, was one of three Edmonton MLAs to retain their seats for the Tories in the 2004 general election. He was first elected in 1997 and has held the International, Intergovernmental and Aboriginal Affairs portfolio as well and Minister of Justice and Attorney General. Until his resignation from Cabinet to run for leader, Hancock was the Government House Leader and Minister of Advanced Education. At that time, Hancock was also the only MLA to sit on both Agenda and Priorities and the Treasury Board committees. He is the author of the Government of Alberta 20 Strategic Business Plan setting the long range framework for the future of the province. He resigned from Cabinet in April 2005 to pursue his leadership bid on a full-time basis. Website: https://web.archive.org/web/20060615210425/http://www.davehancockcrew.ca/

Supporters in caucus: 1 David Hancock
Supporters in Federal Conservative caucus: 1 Laurie Hawn.

=== Jim Dinning ===
Jim Dinning, Alberta's former treasurer, was not a current MLA but was (and remains) on the board of directors of each of a number of major corporations and some other organisations, mostly concerned with public policy research. Website: https://web.archive.org/web/20060613192108/http://jimdinning.ca/

Supporters in caucus: 38 Cindy Ady, Moe Amery, Neil Brown, Wayne Cao, Mike Cardinal, Harvey Cenaiko, David Coutts, Alana DeLong, Clint Dunford, Heather Forsyth, Yvonne Fritz, Gord Graydon, Doug Griffiths, Denis Herard, Mary Anne Jablonski, Art Johnston, Ken Kowalski, Ron Liepert, Rob Lougheed, Thomas Lukaszuk, Ty Lund, Richard Magnus, Gary Mar, Richard Marz, Barry McFarland, Greg Melchin, Len Mitzel, Frank Oberle, Ray Prins, Rob Renner, Dave Rodney, George Rogers, Shiraz Shariff, Ron Stevens, Janis Tarchuk, George VanderBurg, Len Webber, Gene Zwozdesky.
Supporters in federal Conservative caucus: 3 Deepak Obhrai, Bob Mills, Lee Richardson.

=== Victor Doerksen ===
Victor Doerksen, the MLA for Red Deer South and former Minister for Innovation and Science, announced his candidacy on August 17 after resigning from the Cabinet on August 15. Website: https://web.archive.org/web/20061024030954/http://www.voteforvictor.ca/

Supporters in caucus: 1 Victor Doerksen.

=== Gary McPherson ===
Gary McPherson, former chair of the Premier's Council on the Status of Persons with Disabilities, was a quadriplegic since a childhood bout with polio. He announced his candidacy on August 18. Website: https://web.archive.org/web/20070929080918/http://www.teammcpherson.com/blog/

Supporters in caucus: 0 .

== First-round results ==
Candidate	Votes	Percentage
Dinning	29,470	30.2%
Morton	25,614	26.2%
Stelmach	14,967	15.3%
Oberg	11,638	11.9%
Hancock	7,595	7.8%
Norris	6,789	6.9%
Doerksen	873	0.9%
McPherson	744	0.8%
TOTAL	97,690	100.0%

== Second-round voting ==
No candidate achieved the more than the 50% requirement in the first round of voting, so the top three candidates - Jim Dinning, Ted Morton and Ed Stelmach - headed for a second round held on December 2. Lyle Oberg, Dave Hancock, and Mark Norris threw their support behind Ed Stelmach after failing to advance to the second round. McPherson threw his support to Dinning, and Doerksen chose not to endorse any of the three remaining candidates.

Candidate	Votes	Percentage
Stelmach	51,764	35.9%
Dinning	51,282	35.6%
Morton	41,243	28.6%
TOTAL	144,289	100%

Voters indicated their first and second choice on a preferential ballot. As no candidate received 50% plus one of votes cast after first preferences were counted, the third place candidate, Morton, was dropped and the second choices of his voters were apportioned to the two remaining candidates. These second choices overwhelmingly favoured Stelmach, making him leader of the party and incoming premier of Alberta.

== Instant runoff results ==
Candidate	First Choice Votes	Second Choice Votes	Total Votes	Percentage
Stelmach	51,764	25,813	77,577	58.3%
Dinning	51,282	4,227	55,509	41.7%
No Second Choice / Morton 1st and 2nd Choice	N/A	11,203	11,203	-
TOTAL	103,046	41,243	144,289	100%

== Withdrawn candidates ==
=== Alana DeLong ===
Alana DeLong was a Calgary member of the Legislative Assembly (MLA), and the only woman in the race. She dropped out before handing in her nomination papers on October 11 and endorsed Dinning.

== Timeline ==
- March 14, 2006 - Premier Klein announces that he intends to tender his resignation on October 31, 2007, but remain premier until early 2008.
- March 15 - Klein orders all cabinet ministers who intend to run in the leadership election to succeed him to resign from cabinet by June 1, 2006.
- March 22 - Transport Minister Lyle Oberg, a possible contender for the party's leadership, is ousted from Cabinet and suspended from caucus for six months after making critical comments about Klein to his riding association and saying he won't ask delegates from his riding to support Klein in the March 31 leadership review.
- March 31 - 1,500 delegates to the Alberta Progressive Conservative Party convention vote on Klein's leadership in a secret ballot. Klein had indicated he'd resign immediately if he does not receive a "substantial majority" in the leadership review. Klein's leadership is endorsed by only 55.4% of delegates, described as a "crushing blow" to the Premier, who asks for a few days to decide whether to submit his resignation.
- April 4 - In a press conference, Klein announces that he will write party officials a formal letter in September asking them to commence a leadership election. He stated that he expects a new leader will be chosen in October or November 2006 and that he would leave office in December.
- May 17 - Former Reform Party of Canada leader Preston Manning announces he will not be a candidate. Manning had been widely expected to be the frontrunner in the race.
- July 25 - Leadership candidate Oberg is re-admitted to caucus.
- August 15 - Innovation and Science Minister Victor Doerksen resigns from the Cabinet.
- August 17 - Former Innovation and Science Minister Doerksen announces his candidacy. Premier Klein confirms he will tender his resignation as leader on or around September 14, and that he will resign as the MLA for Calgary Elbow upon leaving the premiership.
- August 18 - Former chair of the premier's Council on the Status of Persons with Disabilities, Gary McPherson, announces his candidacy.
- September 20 - Klein resigns as leader of the party, officially opening the Conservative leadership election.
- October 16 - Nominations close at 5:00pm MST.
- November 25 - First ballot of the leadership election. Because no candidate received greater than 50% plus one of the votes, a second ballot will be held; Dinning, Morton and Stelmach will be on the second ballot.
- December 2 - Second ballot of the leadership election. Polls were open between 9:00am and 7:00pm MST. The election was between Dinning, Morton, and Stelmach. Stelmach finished first followed by Dinning. After the second choices of Morton's supporters were factored in Stelmach was declared the winner.
- December 14 - Klein formally tenders his resignation as premier to Albertan lieutenant governor Norman Kwong, who then invites Stelmach to form a government.

== Trivia ==
- The Progressive Conservatives are the first party in Albertan history to have had four premiers. All of the previous governing parties (the Liberals, United Farmers and Social Credit) were defeated in the elections immediately following their third premiers' assuming the office.

== See also ==
- Progressive Conservative Association of Alberta leadership elections
