= Lorne Dach =

Canadian politician

Lorne Dach MLA
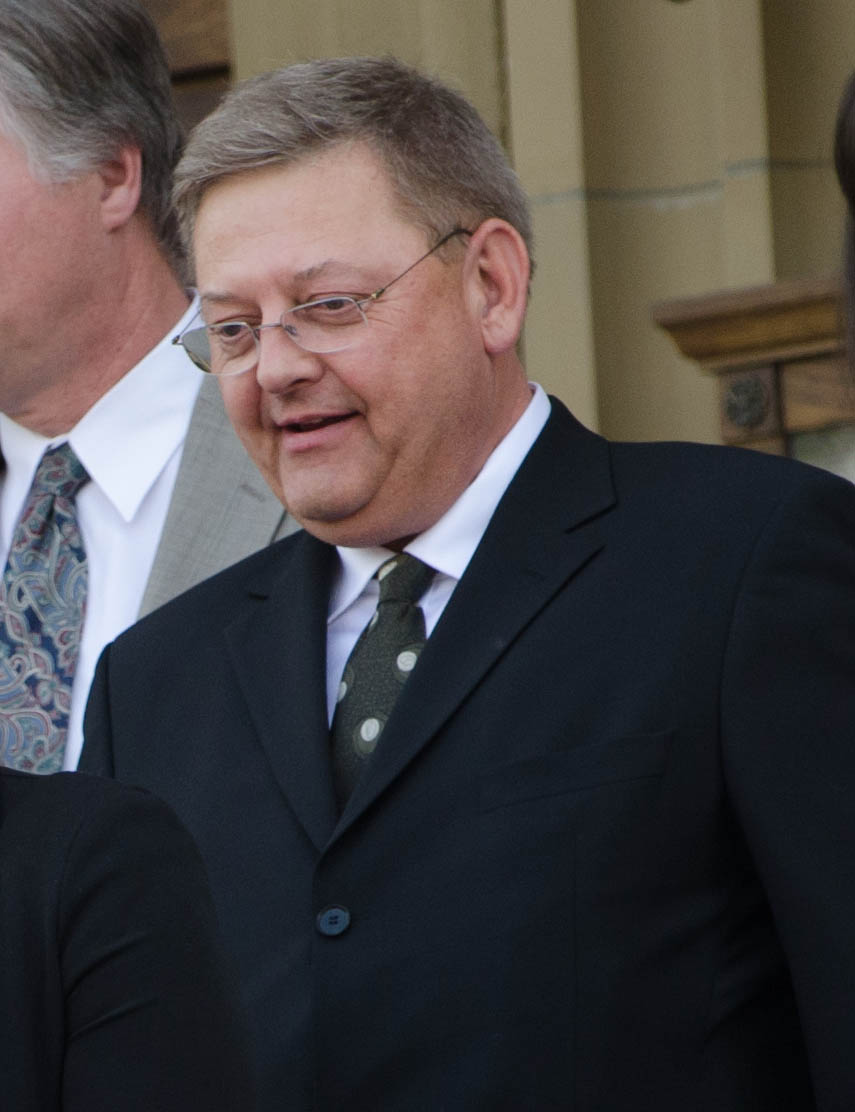
- Dach in 2015

Member of the Legislative Assembly of Alberta for Edmonton-McClung
- Incumbent
- Assumed office May 5, 2015
- Preceded by: David Xiao

Personal details
- Born: 1957 or 1958 (age 67–68)
- Party: Alberta New Democratic Party
- Occupation: Realtor

Lorne Dach (born 1957 or 1958) is a Canadian politician who was elected in the 2015 Alberta general election to the Legislative Assembly of Alberta representing the electoral district of Edmonton-McClung and was re-elected on April 16, 2019. As of June 21, 2024, he serves as the Official Opposition critic for Transportation and for Economic Corridors.

== Personal life ==
Dach has a Bachelor of Arts in Political Science from the University of Alberta.

Before being elected, Dach spent 30 years in the real estate business industry as an Associate Broker.

Dach has volunteered for homeEd on their board of directors, city of Edmonton Non-Profit Housing Corporation and as a probation officer with Alberta Solicitor General's court intake unit.

== Electoral history ==
=== 2023 general election ===
2023 Alberta general election: Edmonton-McClung
Party	Candidate	Votes	%	±%
New Democratic	Lorne Dach	9,603	59.50	+15.87
United Conservative	Daniel Heikkinen	6,029	37.35	+1.47
Independent	Andrew J. Lineker	309	1.91	–
Green	Terry Syvenky	199	1.23	–
Total		16,140	99.19	–
Rejected and declined		131	0.81	
Turnout		16,272	56.13	
Eligible voters		28,991		
New Democratic hold		Swing		+7.20
Source(s) Source: Elections Alberta

=== 2019 general election ===
2019 Alberta general election: Edmonton-McClung
Party	Candidate	Votes	%	±%
New Democratic	Lorne Dach	8,073	43.63%	-11.73%
United Conservative	Laurie Mozeson	6,640	35.89%	-4.00%
Alberta Party	Stephen Mandel	3,601	19.46%	14.71%
Alberta Advantage	Gordon Perrott	188	1.02%	–
Total		18,502	–	–
Rejected, spoiled and declined		109	47	12
Eligible electors / turnout		28,961	64.30%	10.25%
New Democratic hold		Swing		-10.84%
Source(s) Source: "36 - Edmonton-McClung, 2019 Alberta general election". officialresults.elections.ab.ca. Elections Alberta. Alberta. Chief Electoral Officer (2019). 2019 General Election. A Report of the Chief Electoral Officer. Volume II (PDF) (Report). Vol. 2. Edmonton, Alta.: Elections Alberta. pp. 140–143. ISBN 978-1-988620-12-1.

=== 2015 general election ===
2015 Alberta general election: Edmonton-McClung
Party	Candidate	Votes	%	±%
New Democratic	Lorne Dach	9,412	55.36%	47.89%
Progressive Conservative	David Xiao	4,408	25.93%	-20.53%
Wildrose	Steve Thompson	2,373	13.96%	-4.15%
Alberta Party	John Hudson	808	4.75%	2.06%
Total		17,001	–	–
Rejected, spoiled and declined		65	26	20
Eligible electors / turnout		31,612	54.05%	-3.80%
New Democratic gain from Progressive Conservative		Swing		34.36%
Source(s) Source: "38 - Edmonton-McClung, 2015 Alberta general election". officialresults.elections.ab.ca. Elections Alberta. Chief Electoral Officer (2016). 2015 General Election. A Report of the Chief Electoral Officer (PDF) (Report). Edmonton, Alta.: Elections Alberta.

=== 2012 general election ===
2012 Alberta general election: Edmonton-McClung
Party	Candidate	Votes	%	±%
Progressive Conservative	David Xiao	7,179	46.65%	-2.29%
Liberal	Mo Elsalhy	3,800	24.69%	-15.88%
Wildrose	Peter Janisz	2,756	17.91%	+16.05%
New Democratic	Lorne Dach	1,134	7.37%	+1.07%
Alberta Party	John Hudson	418	2.72%	
Evergreen	Nathan Forsyth	102	0.66%	-1.67%
Total		15,389		
Progressive Conservative hold		Swing		-6.80%

=== 2004 general election ===
2004 Alberta general election results		Turnout 51.95%		Swing	
Affiliation	Candidate	Votes	%	Party	Personal
Liberal	Mo Elsalhy	5,859	44.88%	2.08%	
Progressive Conservative	Mark Norris	5,333	40.85%	-9.58%	
New Democratic	Lorne Dach	1,358	10.40%	4.59%	
Alberta Alliance	Reuben Bauer	401	3.07%		
Social Credit	Patrick Conlin	105	0.80%		
Total		13,056			
Rejected, spoiled and declined		71			
Eligible electors / Turnout		25,269	%		
Liberal pickup from Progressive Conservative				Swing 5.83%	

=== 2001 general election ===
2001 Alberta general election results		Turnout 56.01%		Swing	
Affiliation	Candidate	Votes	%	Party	Personal
Progressive Conservative	Mark Norris	6,976	50.43%	16.58%	
Liberal	Nancy MacBeth	5,920	42.80%	-10.78%	
New Democratic	Lorne Dach	804	5.81%	1.73%	
Independent	Patrick Ellis	133	0.96%	*	
Total		13,833			
Rejected, spoiled and declined		18			
Eligible electors / Turnout		24,723	%		
Progressive Conservative gain from Liberal		Swing		13.68%	
