= Mark Norris =

Mark Norris may refer to:

- Mark Norris (Canadian politician) (born 1962), Alberta politician
- Mark Norris (judge) (born 1955), United States federal judge and former Tennessee state senator
- Mark Norris (technology writer), British consultant and writer
