= BarWatch =

Canadian associations

BarWatch are self regulated associations of bars, nightclubs and restaurants across Canada. Members of the BarWatch association draft up regulations for security practices of their members with the goal of reducing violence and the costs associated with it. The members will vote on regulations to enhance security such as the installation of video cameras, greater communication with local law enforcement, and the use of ID scanners for bars and nightclubs.

BarWatch is sometimes mistakenly used to refer to the ID scanning software used by the members of the BarWatch Association. However, the ID scanning software is actually offered by separate private companies such as Servall Data Systems. Subscribers to the ID scanning systems photograph and scan the government issued ID cards of all patrons collecting information such as name, age and photograph . The intent is to prevent people from engaging in criminal activity at bars and nightclubs by creating a database of known incidents. There is controversy about the legality of such systems.

In 2009, the Legislative Assembly of Alberta voted for and passed on Bill 42 allowing bars and nightclubs to collect the person's name, age, and photograph, where doing so does not contradict Alberta's privacy legislation. Bill 42 does not permit bars and nightclubs to collect any additional information, including address or driver's license number, nor does it permit the scanning of driver's licenses. The Alberta Gaming and Liquor Commission also released guidelines for the use of ID scanning systems by license holders , which also clarifies "it is against the law to scan or photocopy the entire face of a patron's driver's license". Shortly afterward, the privacy commissioner of British Columbia followed Alberta's guidelines and passed a similar set of guidelines for bars and nightclubs.
