= West Edmonton =

West Edmonton may refer to:

- Edmonton West (federal electoral district), from 1917 to 1988 and from 1997 to 2004
- Edmonton West (provincial electoral district), from 1917 to 1921 and from 1963 to 1971
- West sector, Edmonton, a region encompassing numerous neighbourhoods
- West Edmonton, Alberta, incorporated as a village in 1910, annexed by Edmonton in 1917
- West Edmonton Mall, a shopping mall in Summerlea, Edmonton
