= Heather Klimchuk =

Canadian politician (born 1958)

The Honourable Heather Klimchuk ECA
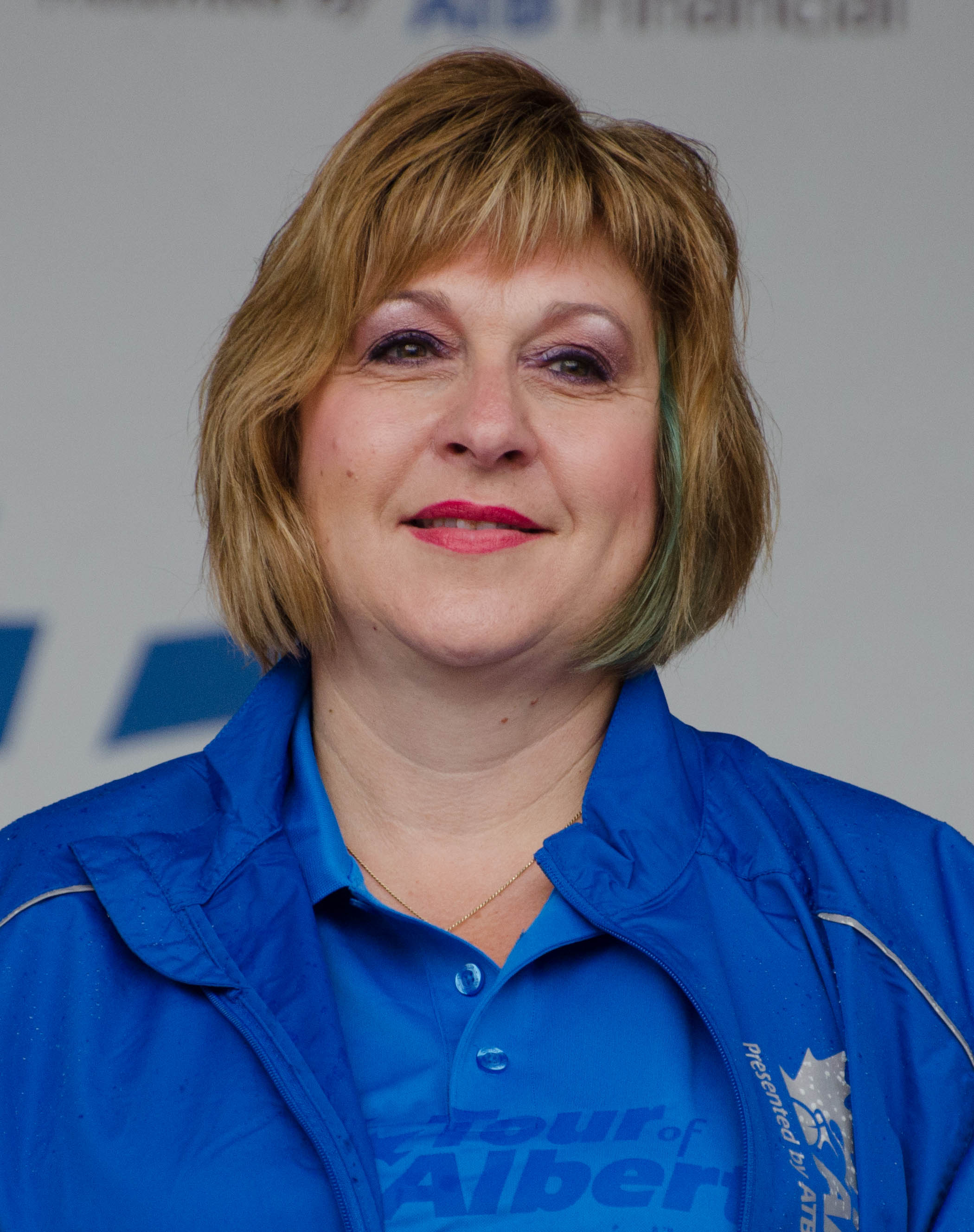
- Klimchuk at the 2014 Tour of Alberta

Member of the Legislative Assembly of Alberta for Edmonton-Glenora
- In office March 3, 2008 – May 5, 2015
- Preceded by: Bruce Miller
- Succeeded by: Sarah Hoffman

Personal details
- Born: August 10, 1958 (age 67) Calgary, Alberta
- Party: Progressive Conservative
- Spouse: Wade Klimchuk
- Occupation: Real Estate Agent, Politician
- Portfolio: Minister of Human Services

Heather May Klimchuk ECA (born August 10, 1958) is a Canadian politician who was a member of the Legislative Assembly of Alberta representing the constituency of Edmonton-Glenora as a Progressive Conservative, from 2008 to 2015. She was Minister of Human Services from 2014 until defeated in the 2015 provincial election.

== Political career ==
Before being elected in the 2008 Alberta General Election, Klimchuk also ran the 2001 and 2004 election campaigns of former Edmonton-Glenora MLA Drew Hutton.

She was narrowly elected as MLA for Edmonton-Glenora in the 2008 election over Alberta Liberal Party incumbent Bruce Miller by 96 votes, less than 1% of votes cast. In the 2011 PC leadership election Klimchuk supported Gary Mar, who was defeated by Alison Redford. Klimchuk was re-elected by a more comfortable margin in the 2012 election and was named Minister of Human Services on September 15, 2014 in the first cabinet of Jim Prentice. She has previously served as Minister of Culture and Community Services and Minister of Service Alberta. Klimchuk was defeated in the 2015 Alberta general election as the Alberta NDP won every seat in Edmonton.

She was considered to be part of the progressive or Red Tory wing of the PC Party.

== Personal life ==
Klimchuk has a long family history with the PC Party. Her father worked on Premier Peter Lougheed's first electoral campaign and was a classmate of Joe Clark's at law school. Her public service experience prior to serving as a Member of the Legislature includes working as a researcher and writer for both Premier Lougheed and Premier Don Getty.She also assisted with the initiation of the Alberta Seniors´ information phone line.

In the 1980s Klimchuk worked as a hair model, often entering competitions.

Post-politics she became Director of Alberta Ballet.

Klimchuk holds a bachelor of arts (special) from the University of Alberta in political science. She and her husband, Wade, have two children: Kyrsten and Keifer.

== Election results ==
2008 Alberta general election: Edmonton-Glenora
Party	Candidate	Votes	%	±%
Progressive Conservative	Heather Klimchuk	4,604	39.90%	11.22%
Liberal	Bruce Miller	4,508	39.07%	3.94%
New Democratic	Arlene Chapman	1,743	15.11%	-15.81%
Green	Peter Johnston	408	3.54%	1.47%
Wildrose Alliance	Elden Van Hauwaert	275	2.38%	–
Total		11,538	–	–
Rejected, spoiled and declined		36	20	2
Eligible electors / turnout		27,266	42.46%	-14.11%
Progressive Conservative gain from Liberal		Swing		-1.69%
Source(s) Source: "31 - Edmonton-Glenora, 2008 Alberta general election". officialresults.elections.ab.ca. Elections Alberta. The Report on the March 3, 2008 Provincial General Election of the Twenty-seventh Legislative Assembly. Elections Alberta. July 28, 2008. pp. 294–297.

2012 Alberta general election: Edmonton-Glenora
Party	Candidate	Votes	%	±%
Progressive Conservative	Heather Klimchuk	6,183	38.24%	-1.66%
New Democratic	Ray Martin	4,143	25.62%	10.52%
Wildrose Alliance	Don Koziak	2,732	16.90%	14.51%
Liberal	Bruce Miller	1,670	10.33%	-28.74%
Alberta Party	Sue Huff	1,441	8.91%	–
Total		16,169	–	–
Rejected, spoiled and declined		119	55	6
Eligible electors / turnout		29,262	55.68%	13.23%
Progressive Conservative hold		Swing		5.89%
Source(s) Source: "34 - Edmonton-Glenora, 2012 Alberta general election". officialresults.elections.ab.ca. Elections Alberta.

2015 Alberta general election
Party	Candidate	Votes	%	±%
New Democratic	Sarah Hoffman	12,403	68.5	
Progressive Conservative	Heather Klimchuk	3,137	17.3	
Wildrose	Don Koziak	1,381	7.6	
Liberal	Karen Sevcik	542	3.0	
Alberta Party	Chris Vilcsak	445	2.5	
Green	David Parker	199	1.1	
