= Alberta Gaming, Liquor and Cannabis Commission =

Government agency of Alberta, Canada

- Formerly: Alberta Gaming and Liquor Commission (1996–2018)
- Company type: Crown corporation
- Predecessors: Alberta Liquor Control Board (ALCB); Alberta Lotteries; Alberta Gaming Commission
- Founded: 1996
- Headquarters: 50 Corriveau Avenue, St. Albert, Alberta
- Area served: Alberta
- Key people: Kandice Machado (CEO)
- Owner: Government of Alberta
- Website: aglc.ca

The Alberta Gaming, Liquor and Cannabis Commission (AGLC) is an agency of the government of the Canadian province of Alberta, and regulates alcoholic beverages, recreational cannabis, and gaming-related activities. References to cannabis were added to AGLC's name and governing legislation (without adding an extra "C" to the organization's long-standing initials) as cannabis in Canada moved towards legalization in 2018. AGLC was created in 1996 as the Alberta Gaming and Liquor Commission by combining the responsibilities and operations of the Alberta Liquor Control Board (ALCB), Alberta Lotteries, the Alberta Gaming Commission, Alberta Lotteries and Gaming and the Gaming Control Branch. The current chief executive officer as of 2020 is Kandice Machado.

In 2023, the AGLC made $618.9 million in revenue from cannabis sales, $1.9 billion in sales from gaming (slots, VLTs, online gambling, bingo, lottery tickets, raffles, and pull tickets), and $850.4 million in revenue from alcohol and liquor. Combined with the AGLC's other income streams, in 2023 their net income was $2.42 billion, up from $2.09 billion in 2022. The vast majority of this income went into the Alberta government's General Revenue Fund.

== Legislation ==
AGLC operates in accordance with:

- The Gaming, Liquor and Cannabis Act;
- The Gaming, Liquor and Cannabis Regulation; and
- The Criminal Code.

Alberta Gaming, Liquor and Cannabis also enforces certain aspects of the Tobacco Tax Act under a memorandum of understanding with Alberta Finance, which administers the act, and licenses all racing entertainment centres at racetracks under the authority of the Horse Racing Alberta Act.

Alberta is the only Canadian province to have completely privatized its liquor retailing. All other provinces maintain government ownership and control over much of the liquor industry, especially with respect to distilled spirits. Alberta's privatization was carried out in late 1993 and early 1994 under the auspices of one of AGLC's predecessors, the ALCB.

Following cannabis legalization in October 2018, the AGLC was the sole entity permitted to retail cannabis online within the province and the only legal wholesale distributor of cannabis to private brick-and-mortar retailers. As of March 8, 2022, private retailers became permitted to retail cannabis online and the province has since exited the retail business. However, the AGLC remains the only legal wholesale distributor of cannabis to private retailers.

== History ==
The sale and distribution of beverage alcohol in Alberta had been conducted privately, under licence until 1916 when, during the height of Canada's Prohibition during the First World War, the Liberal government called a referendum in which Albertans voted in favour of the Liquor Act, which closed private liquor stores and the sale of alcohol beverage other than weak beer in privately owned bars. (Alcohol was still available from willing pharmacists.)

Prohibition achieved the result that family savings doubled within a short time, and the use of mental asylums and prisons dropped. The policy of prohibition was affirmed in a 1920 referendum. Meanwhile, the Royal North-West Mounted Police (RNWMP) passed over enforcement to the newly created Alberta Provincial Police (APP). However, there grew a hard-core of bootleggers who used guns against police enforcing the law – resulting in the death of two policemen, George Osgoode and Stephen O. Lawson, in Alberta. The United Farmers government that replaced the Liberals in 1921 called a referendum to allow voters to show their determination to continue with prohibition, bring back the pre-war wild times or establish government-owned stores and allow increased sales through tightly regulated taverns. The referendum was conducted in November 1923 and Albertans chose a government-controlled system. The Liquor Act was replaced by the Liquor Control Act and the Alberta Liquor Control Board (ALCB) was created. The first hotels to be relicensed were the Palliser Hotel in Calgary and the Hotel Macdonald in Edmonton.

The ALCB maintained tight control over the Alberta liquor industry for the next seven decades. Hotels that met the strict requirements for a liquor licence had to adhere to strict rules regarding the décor, cleanliness and aura of the establishment. According to historian David Leonard, the idea was to make drinking establishments as sparse as possible. Patrons were not allowed to stand up with their drinks in hand, and entertainment in a licensed beverage room was prohibited. Although women were allowed to drink alongside their male counterparts at first, "mixed" drinking was later blamed for riotous behaviour, and in 1928 the Liquor Control Act was amended so that special rooms had to be created for "ladies and escorts". In the 1930s, the ALCB hired armed officers to enforce the Liquor Control Act. The Royal Canadian Mounted Police (RCMP) assumed enforcement duties (where no municipal police had jurisdiction) after taking over provincial policing duties from the APP in 1932.

Beer off-sales were permitted from hotels starting in 1934, however the sale of wine and hard liquor remained more tightly controlled. As was the case in most Canadian provinces, the only legal way to purchase spirits in Alberta was to travel to a deliberately uninviting ALCB store, where the customer had to apply on a paper form indicating what they wanted to purchase. The requested product was then fetched by a staff member after the customer's age was carefully checked. The ALCB did not permit individualized packaging for wine or spirits. It purchased wine and spirits from wineries and distillers in bulk barrels, then bottled them into stone jars and bottles with the ALCB brand for resale in stores. ALCB stores were few and far between (especially in rural areas), and spirits were frequently watered down prior to bottling.

A Social Credit government assumed office in 1935, going on to dominate Albertan politics for the next three decades. The socially conservative governments of Premiers William Aberhart and Ernest Manning were slower to relax liquor laws compared to most of their contemporaries in other provinces. In one notable policy, the Social Credit government refused to license commercial airlines during their tenure and took vigorous steps to ensure that commercial flights were not serving alcohol whilst travelling through Alberta airspace.

The Alberta government and ALCB began loosening some restrictions in the 1950s and 1960s. Clubs and canteens could be licensed from 1950 onwards. In the 1957 Alberta Liquor Plebiscite, voters in and near Edmonton and Calgary voted overwhelmingly to de-segregate beverage rooms; however, men and women were not allowed to drink together province-wide until 1967. Having repealed the requirement for customer signatures on counter slips to purchase alcohol in 1965, in 1969 the ALCB opened its first self-serve liquor store in Edmonton. By 1970 the ALCB was no longer bottling products and commercial product packaging became normal.

The Progressive Conservative government replaced the Socreds in 1971, and moved to loosen restrictions further, lowering the drinking age from 21 to 18. Although some Alberta MLA's since then have mooted raising the drinking age back to 19 to match the laws of neighbouring British Columbia and Saskatchewan, the lower drinking age remains in effect as of 2021. Responsibility for domestic beer warehousing was transferred to the Alberta Brewers' Agents Limited in 1973.

The 1980s saw restrictions relaxed further, with the first wine stores licensed in 1985 and the first hotel-based cold beer stores approved in 1988. In 1990 hotel off-sales expanded from beer only to beer, wine and spirits.

=== Privatization ===
The complete privatization of Alberta liquor retailing following former Calgary mayor Ralph Klein's accession of the premiership in 1992 is the most notable event in the ALCB's history, and for many Canadians it is also the most controversial event in the recent history of alcoholic beverage distribution in Canada. Klein promised Albertan voters the liquor industry would be privatized if he was elected in the 1993 election. After he won the election, the Klein government carried out the privatization almost immediately.

Under Municipal Affairs Minister Steve West, privatization was carried out, and the 202 ALCB liquor stores were systematically sold off. Where private interests believed an existing ALCB store could be profitably operated as a privately owned liquor store, the store continued to operate under new ownership. Liquor stores that were not economically viable in the private sector were closed down with the properties sold to the highest bidder. Between September 4, 1993, and March 5, 1994, every ALCB store was either sold or shut down. With respect to the ALCB stores that were converted to private liquor stores, the Alberta Union of Provincial Employees (AUPE) was denied successor rights to the private stores. Whereas all non-management ALCB employees in 1993 belonged to the AUPE, as of 2006 no privately owned liquor store was known to have become unionized except for those owned and operated by Loblaws under the Real Canadian Liquorstore and those owned and operated by Safeway in their grocery stores.

The ALCB initially retained warehousing and distribution responsibilities for wine, coolers, imported beer and spirits. The warehousing operation was contracted out to a private operator, Connect Logistics in June 1994. Connect Logistics leased the ALCB's existing warehouse in St. Albert and continues to warehouse all wine, coolers, imported beer and spirits legally sold in Alberta. Domestic beer is warehoused and distributed by Brewer's Distributor Limited. The AUPE was again denied successor rights to the Connect Logistics–operated warehouse and the warehouse thus became a non-union operation.

Privatization was controversial, attracting criticism from people who worried about the social costs of liquor privatization.

ALCB workers had taken strike action earlier in 1993 causing an interruption in service at liquor stores. Compared to other Canadian provinces, Albertans are generally seen as less friendly to unions, and many Albertans were disappointed by what they interpreted as the union's lack of concern for Albertans' social lives (the strike over the Victoria Day weekend). Some Alberta labour leaders continue to view the privatization as a retaliation against a legal strike. It is still debated whether this strike directly influenced the Tories' election promise and subsequent decision to privatize liquor store, or influenced some Albertans to vote for Klein as a result.

Distribution delays by Connect Logistics became a problem in 2006 with complaints from liquor retailers that they were not receiving stock on time and had empty shelves as a result. Some retailers also initiated legal action against AGLC.

In response, AGLC hired a 3rd-party consultant, Price Waterhouse Coopers, to review the province's liquor distribution system. The report was publicly released in March 2007.

The report did not make any drastic recommendations on how liquor products are distributed in Alberta. It recommended that Connect Logistics remain in its role and continue to warehouse and distribute wine, spirits, and imported beer to maintain "stability" in the system. The biggest difference in this arrangement would now require a formalized contract between Connect Logistics and AGLC including "performance indicators" for things like consumer service and on-time delivery.

One of the more controversial recommendations was for a new warehouse pricing system. In July 2007, AGLC approved the new prices for storage, warehousing and distribution. Connect Logistics claims the new prices better reflected the actual handling costs of each product. Some managers of smaller liquor stores believed that the system worked to the advantage of larger operators.

Over the 2007 Christmas season, the stories of empty liquor store shelves and product shortages disappeared from the media as shelves remained stocked.

A follow-up report was released in June 2009.

=== Today ===
Although Alberta has deregulated its retail liquor industry to a greater extent compared to any other province, its Connect Logistics–administered monopoly on the wholesaling of wine and distilled spirits is comparable to the systems which in the U.S. would be considered an alcoholic beverage control state. This means that by U.S. standards, Alberta would be defined as a "control" jurisdiction.

When the U.S. abolished prohibition in 1933 the bordering U.S. state of Montana modelled its own liquor control board on the one in place in Alberta. Montana has made similar changes to Alberta over the years and its present liquor distribution system is still very similar to the present Albertan system. It is considered to be one of the 18 "control" states in the U.S.

In 2007–2008 disorderly conduct at and near licensed establishments was identified as a growing problem, particularly in the major cities. The province's economic boom and the resulting affluence of its youth were identified as the root cause of the increase in binge drinking. Some blamed inadequate restrictions on alcohol sales in establishments (compared to other provinces) as contributing to the problem. In July 2008, the Alberta government responded to complaints by police and other groups by introducing new regulations to restrict the sale of alcohol in restaurants and bars. Among other things, as of August 1, 2008:

- Happy hours are still allowed, but they can no longer run past 8 p.m. Drinks sold after this time must be sold for the establishment's regular menu price, thus all-night drink specials which entail selling certain categories of drink for a discount are no longer legal.
- Minimum prices are in effect. Alcoholic beverages may not be sold for below these minimums. They vary by beverage:
  - $2.75 each for spirits and liqueurs.
  - $0.35 per ounce for wine (i.e. $1.75 for a 5-imperial-fluid-ounce (140 mL) glass).
  - $0.16 per ounce for draught beer (i.e. $3.20 for a 20-imperial-fluid-ounce (570 mL) pint).
  - $2.75 per 12-imperial-fluid-ounce (340 mL) bottle or can of beer, cider or coolers.
- The number and size of drinks that can be sold to a patron after 1 a.m. is limited to two standard servings per order – one standard serving being defined as 1 imperial fluid ounce (28 mL) of distilled spirit or one bottle or can of beer.
- Possession of more than two drinks after 1 a.m. in a licensed establishment is prohibited.

AGLC is responsible for enforcing these new rules.

In response to the above industry concerns, AGLC instituted a certification course called ProServe. Proserve covers symptoms of intoxication, liquor law, identifying minors, dealing with intoxicated people, and other issues that a licensed establishment may face. As of January 1, 2010, all people selling and serving liquor must be certified.

On November 26, 2010, AGLC temporarily halted registration of beers with an alcohol content higher than 11.9% (while allowing current retail stocks to still be sold). The restriction was lifted three weeks later on December 16, once a new policy had been developed to deal with a potential influx of ultra-high alcohol beers. The new policy equalized markup rates so that high-alcohol beers were treated the same as other liquor products with similar alcohol levels.

On February 6, 2018, Premier Rachel Notley ordered AGLC to cease importing wine from British Columbia, as an economic sanction against the province's decision to perform further environmental reviews over a proposed expansion of the Trans Mountain Pipeline.

== Organization and mandate ==
AGLC consists of a board and a corporation. The corporation acts as the operational arm of the organization, while the board is responsible for reflecting the government's direction through policy and regulatory matters.

As of January 2024, the AGLC's board members were:

Name	Role	Background	Compensation (2022)
Len Rhodes	Chair	SVP & GM of Reebok-CCM's Global Hockey Division, Alternate Board Governor of Canadian Football League, President & CEO of Edmonton Elks, Board Chair of Edmonton Chamber of Commerce, First Vice-Chair of Western Canada Lottery Corporation.	$148,034.88
Kandice Machado	CEO	Associate at G.P. Coskey.	$332,141.92
Tongjie (TJ) Zhang	Board Member	VP of University of Calgary Graduate Students' Association, VP Internal of JCI (Junior Chamber International) Calgary, Consultant at KMPG, Board Member of Credit Union Deposit Guarantee Corporation (Alberta), Manager at PwC, Cyber Security Architect at ENFOCOM International Corporation, Senator at University of Calgary, Board Member at Alberta Association of Police Governance, Vice-Chair of College of Alberta Dental Assistants, Commissioner on Calgary Police Commission, Operational Technology Security Architecture at CN Railway.	$59,279.44
Angela Tu Weissenberger	Board Member	Group Head and Senior Industry Analyst, Energy and Chemicals at Royal Bank of Canada, Board Director at Honens International Piano Competition, Private Sector Board Director at Canada Deposit Insurance Corporation, Owner and Principal of ATW Associates Inc. Married to John Weissenberger, who was the Campaign Manager for Stephen Harper in 1993 and Jason Kenney in 2017, and current VP Technical Science/External Innovation at the Alberta Energy Regulator.	$45,992.32
Jack Fujino	Board Member	SVP Environmental Group at Stantec, Board Member of Alberta Chamber of Resources.	$55,050.45
Patti Grier	Board Member	Alderman of Calgary Ward 13, VP Government Relations for Calgary Health Region, Chief of Staff for Alberta Health Services, VP Business Services at CEDA International, Board Member of RCMP Management Advisory Board	$64,432.57
Wayne Drysdale	Board Member	MLA for Grande Prairie-Wapiti, SVP at Aquatera; Directorships at Alberta Milk Producers, Alberta Beef Producers, Grande Prairie Regional Emergency Medical Service.	n/a
Vincent Vavrek	Board Member	Partner at Fletcher Mudryk LLP, Board Member at Alberta Electric System Operator, Chair of Northwestern Polytechnic, Founding Director of Northwestern Alberta Foundation, Board Member at CPA Alberta, Board Member at Alberta Blue Cross.	$50,959.55
Maureen Moneta	Board Member	Senior Auditor at Kingston Ross Pasnak LLP, Controller at Habitat for Humanity Edmonton, EVP Finance/Technology at University Hospital Foundation, Senior Executive Officer at Rupertsland Institute, Board Member for Edmonton Unlimited, Board Member of Alberta Indigenous Opportunities Corporation.	$40,766.23
Elan Harper	Board Member	Strategic Planning Analyst for Canadian Airlines, Associate Director of Bell Canada, Manager Oil and Gas Tax at KPMG, Manager International Tax at PwC, Principal Canadian and International Tax at Moodys Tax, VP at StrategyCorp Inc. She is the sister in-law of Stephen Harper.	$42,385.15

Although liquor is retailed in Alberta by private interests on a competitive basis, like its predecessor AGLC has maintained a monopoly over the wholesaling of wine, coolers, imported beer and spirits. AGLC is the wholesale-level purchaser of these products and thus Alberta liquor taxes (which are still high compared to taxes in the U.S.) are termed as the liquor markup. The wholesaling operation itself is mostly handled by Connect Logistics, a contract distributor based in St. Albert. Maintaining a monopoly over the wholesale business allows AGLC to maintain tighter controls over liquor distribution than an entirely privatized system would allow. In particular it allows the government to ensure that it does not miss out on any "markup" (the bulk of the liquor tax in any Canadian province, including Alberta, is the provincial liquor markup).

Between 1999 and 2006 AGLC operated as part of the Ministry of Gaming. When Ed Stelmach became premier, he restructured government so there were fewer ministries and ministers. The Ministry of Gaming was abolished following December 2006's reorganization, and AGLC was assigned to report through the Solicitor General and Minister of Public Security, at the time Frank Oberle Jr. AGLC later reported via Ministers Ron Liepert and Doug Horner, until AGLC was directed to report through Treasury Board and Finance to Robin Campbell.

Following the provincial election of 2015, which saw the Alberta New Democratic Party form government, AGLC reported to Treasury Board and Finance Minister Joe Ceci.
