= Stanley Geldart =

Canadian politician

Member of the Legislative Assembly of Alberta
- In office June 17, 1963 – May 23, 1967
- Preceded by: New district
- Succeeded by: Lou Hyndman
- Constituency: Edmonton West

Personal details
- Born: Stanley Gordon Geldart; June 18, 1919
- Died: January 23, 1983 (aged 63)
- Party: Social Credit
- Occupation: politician

Stanley Gordon Geldart (June 18, 1919 – January 23, 1983) was a provincial politician from Alberta, Canada. He served as a member of the Legislative Assembly of Alberta from 1963 to 1967 sitting with the Social Credit caucus in government.

== Political career ==
Geldart ran for a seat in the Alberta Legislature in the 1963 general election. He ran as a Social Credit candidate in the new electoral district of Edmonton West. He defeated three other candidates with 41% of the popular vote. He retired at dissolution of the assembly in 1967.
