= Grant Mitchell (politician) =

Canadian politician and businessman

The Honourable Grant Mitchell

Canadian Senator from Alberta
- In office March 24, 2005 – April 24, 2020
- Nominated by: Paul Martin
- Appointed by: Adrienne Clarkson
- Succeeded by: Karen Sorensen

Leader of the Official Opposition in Alberta
- In office November 12, 1994 – April 17, 1998
- Preceded by: Laurence Decore
- Succeeded by: Howard Sapers

Leader of the Alberta Liberal Party
- In office 1994–1998
- Preceded by: Bettie Hewes (interim)
- Succeeded by: Nancy MacBeth

MLA for Edmonton Meadowlark
- In office 1986–1993

MLA for Edmonton McClung
- In office 1993–1998

Personal details
- Born: July 19, 1951 (age 75) Ottawa, Ontario, Canada
- Party: Non-affiliated
- Other political affiliations: Alberta Liberal Party, Liberal (until 2014); Independent Liberal (2014–16)
- Education: Queen's University, University of Alberta
- Occupation: Businessman, financial analyst, lecturer

Grant Mitchell (born July 19, 1951) is a Canadian politician and businessman. Over his career, he was leader of the Alberta Liberal Party and a member of the Senate of Canada.

== Education ==
He received a BA degree from the University of Alberta and an MA degree from Queen's University.

== Career ==
From 1976 to 1979, he worked as a public servant with the Government of Alberta. From 1979 to 1986, he worked in the financial sector as an executive with Edmonton's Principal Group.

From 1998 to 2005, while out of politics, Mitchell joined CIBC Wood Gundy as an investment advisor.

He has also served on the boards of the Canadian Commercial Corporation, the Edmonton ITU World Cup Triathlon and the Edmonton Police Foundation.

== Political career ==
=== Provincial politics ===
Mitchell was first elected to the Alberta legislature as the Liberal MLA for Edmonton Meadowlark in 1986. Following his re-election in 1989, he was re-elected in 1993 and 1997 in the new riding of Edmonton McClung.

After placing second in the 1988 Liberal leadership contest to Edmonton mayor Laurence Decore, he became leader of the party and opposition leader in Alberta in 1994 and served until 1998, when he left provincial politics. He was succeeded as Liberal leader by Nancy MacBeth.

=== Federal politics ===
On March 24, 2005, he was appointed to the Canadian Senate by Governor General Adrienne Clarkson, on the advice of Prime Minister Paul Martin, where he represented Edmonton.

Mitchell served on three Senate committees: National Finance; Legal and Constitutional Affairs; and Agriculture and Forestry. He sat on the Senate committee for Human Rights and was deputy chair of the Senate Committee for Energy, the Environment and Natural Resources.

On January 29, 2014, Liberal Party leader Justin Trudeau announced all Liberal senators, including Mitchell, were removed from the Liberal caucus, and would continue sitting as independents. The senators referred to themselves as the Senate Liberal Caucus even though they were no longer members of the parliamentary Liberal caucus.

On May 2, 2016, he left the Senate Liberal Caucus to sit as an independent; the next day he was appointed whip by Government Representative in the Senate Peter Harder. As such, Mitchell acted as a liaison between the government and senators and tried to secure votes for government legislation.

On November 29, 2019, the Prime Minister's Office announced that Senator Harder would step down from his position as Representative of the Government in the Senate effective December 31, 2019, and that Mitchell would step down as Government Liaison but continue in the role until Harder's successor was named in "due course." Marc Gold was named Harder's successor on January 24, 2020. Mitchell retired from the Senate on April 24, 2020.

== Personal ==
Grant Mitchell is married to Teresa Mitchell (née Flood), an Edmonton lawyer. They have three sons: Lucas, Liam, Grady.
