= Sarah Hoffman =

Canadian politician (born 1980)

The Honourable Sarah Hoffman ECA MLA
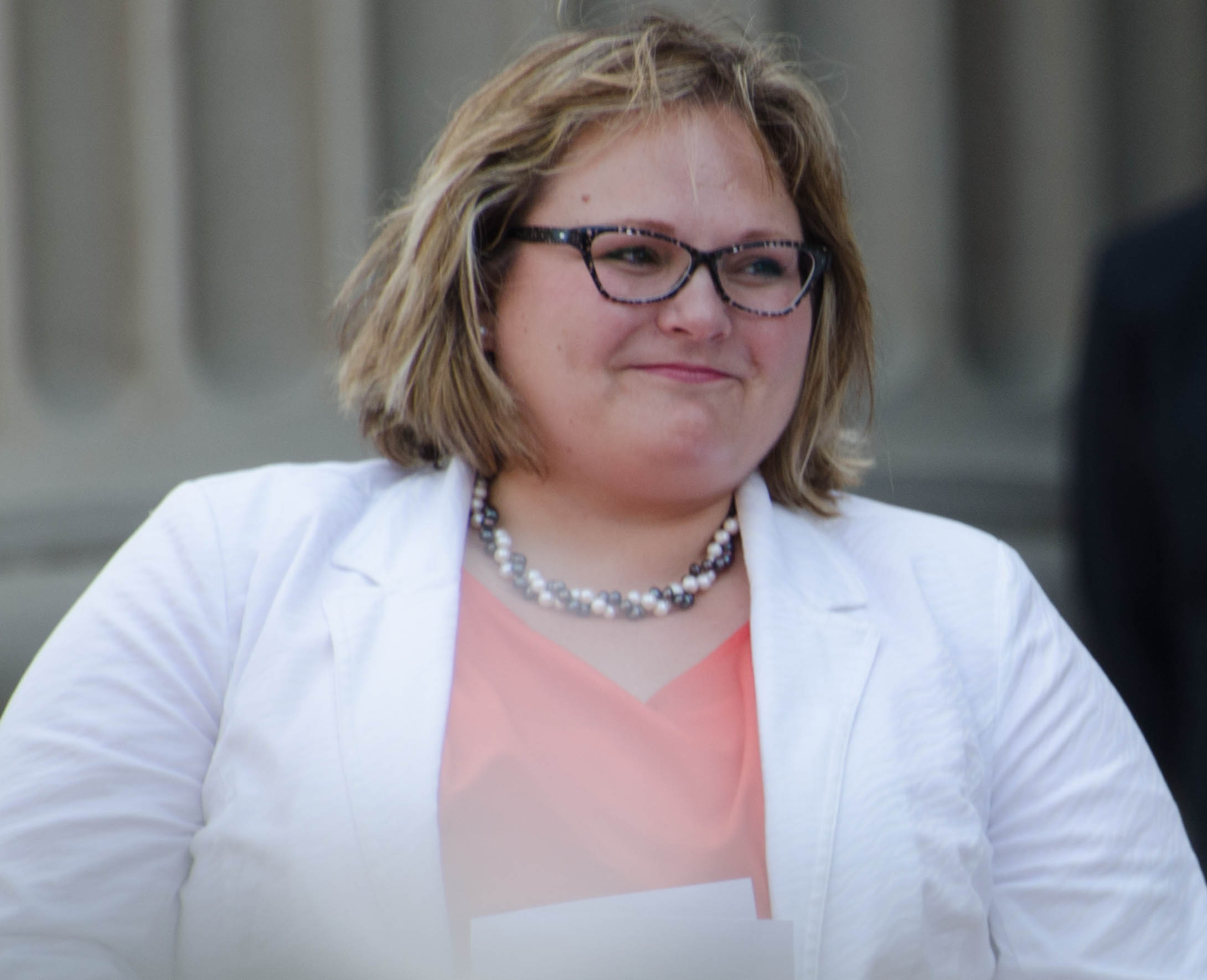
- Hoffman in 2015

Deputy Premier of Alberta
- In office February 2, 2016 – April 30, 2019
- Premier: Rachel Notley
- Preceded by: Dave Hancock (2014)
- Succeeded by: Kaycee Madu; Nathan Neudorf (2022)

Minister of Health (Note: Office known as "Minister of Health and Seniors" from May 24, 2015, to February 2, 2016.)
- In office May 24, 2015 – April 30, 2019
- Premier: Rachel Notley
- Preceded by: Stephen Mandel
- Succeeded by: Tyler Shandro

Member of the Legislative Assembly of Alberta for Edmonton-Glenora
- Incumbent
- Assumed office May 5, 2015
- Preceded by: Heather Klimchuk

Personal details
- Born: Sarah Marjorie Hoffman; May 23, 1980 (age 46)
- Party: New Democratic
- Education: Concordia University College of Alberta; University of Alberta
- Occupation: Public school trustee, teacher

Sarah Marjorie Hoffman ECA MLA (born May 23, 1980) is a Canadian politician who served as the 10th deputy premier of Alberta and minister of Health in the cabinet of Rachel Notley. Hoffman was previously a member of the Edmonton Public School Board, where she served from 2010 to 2015 and from 2012 onward as chair. Prior to her service on the school board, she was the research director of the Alberta Legislature New Democrat caucus. After stepping down from the School Board, she was elected in the 2015 Alberta general election to the Legislative Assembly of Alberta representing the electoral district of Edmonton-Glenora for the Alberta NDP. On May 24, 2015, she was sworn in as Minister of Health and Minister of Seniors for the province of Alberta. Following a cabinet reshuffle on 2 February 2016, she retained the Health portfolio and became deputy premier.

In 2024, she was a candidate for the post of leader of the Alberta NDP.

== Background ==
Hoffman has worked as both a teacher and researcher for the NDP before becoming involved in politics. She holds a BA and BSc from Concordia University College of Alberta, in religion and math respectively. She also holds a Bachelor of Education and a Master of Education from the University of Alberta, with a specialization in educational policy studies.

Hoffman was first elected to the Edmonton School Board in 2010, and was acclaimed for a second term in 2013. She served as the vice-chair of the board from her initial election to 2012, and then as the chair from 2012 to 2015 when she resigned to run for provincial office.

Hoffman is also a past member of the Girl Guides of Canada.

== Political career ==
=== Initial cabinet appointment ===
Hoffman was appointed Minister of Health and Seniors, on May 25, 2015. As health minister, Hoffman is responsible for policy, direction, legislation and standards of the health system in Alberta, which is delivered by Alberta Health Services.

Affordable housing was part of the NDP's campaign commitment to increase affordable housing for seniors, and was actioned in part through increasing funding for the Alberta Social Housing Corporation. In 2016, Lori Sigurdson was given the seniors portfolio, while Brandy Payne was appointed Associate Minister of Health.

Under Hoffman's tenure, health care fees proposed under Jim Prentice and Stephen Mandel were soon reversed, and additional spending in health was initiated. Included in the budget was funding for new and existing medical centres, including the development of the Calgary Cancer Centre and repair of the Royal Alexandra Hospital in Edmonton, though Hoffman was criticized over the reduced level of funding available. Hoffman's ministry also banned menthol tobacco products in September, a move which was designed to decrease the prevalence of smoking among youth.

In 2017 Alberta Health Services discontinued both IVF and IUI services at the Lois Hole hospital for women when relevant physicians moved to a different clinic.

=== Fentanyl crisis ===
Prior to Payne's appointment as associate minister, Hoffman was responsible for her department's response to the fentanyl crisis in Alberta. The street drug killed 213 people in the first 9 months of 2015, and is projected to have increased use in 2016. Hoffman outlined the province's response to the drug, stating that increased quantities of naloxone would be available to counter-act the overdose effects of fentanyl. The province has also engaged in an information campaign directed at youth, to prevent further use of the drug. This campaign primarily targets schools, with posters being placed in prominent areas that outline the harmful effects of using the drug.

The response of the provincial and federal governments has been criticized, as access to the antidote remains low despite an increasing number of fentanyl-related deaths. This problem is particularly pronounced on indigenous reserves, which have less available access to government clinics, and instead rely on a combination of provincial services and federal support to obtain the materials required to treat fentanyl overdoses. As part of the provincial government's response, Hoffman communicated with indigenous chiefs to find ways of increasing antidote supply on reserves in August 2015.

== Controversy ==
Hoffman came under fire for comments made during question period, wherein she suggested the then opposition Wildrose Party was spending too much time with "sewer rats". Many Wildrose supporters said they felt the sewer rats comment had been directed at them. Hoffman later apologized for the remarks.

== Electoral record ==
=== 2023 general election ===
2023 Alberta general election: Edmonton-Glenora
Party	Candidate	Votes	%	±%
New Democratic	Sarah Hoffman	12,443	69.20	+10.54
United Conservative	Melissa Crane	5,056	28.12	-1.64
Green	Julian Schulz	332	1.85	–
Solidarity Movement	David John Bohonos	150	0.83	–
Total		17,981	99.14	–
Rejected and declined		156	0.86	
Turnout		18,137	56.28	
Eligible voters		32,227		
New Democratic hold		Swing		+6.09
Source(s) Source: Elections Alberta

=== 2019 general election ===
2019 Alberta general election: Edmonton-Glenora
Party	Candidate	Votes	%	±%
New Democratic	Sarah Hoffman	11,573	58.67%	-9.78%
United Conservative	Marjorie Newman	5,871	29.76%	4.85%
Alberta Party	Glen Tickner	1,985	10.06%	7.52%
Alberta Independence	Clint Kelley	298	1.51%	–
Total		19,727	–	–
Rejected, spoiled and declined		84	48	10
Eligible electors / turnout		32,349	61.27%	8.03%
New Democratic hold		Swing		-11.14%
Source(s) Source: "32 - Edmonton-Glenora, 2019 Alberta general election". officialresults.elections.ab.ca. Elections Alberta. Alberta. Chief Electoral Officer (2019). 2019 General Election. A Report of the Chief Electoral Officer. Volume II (PDF) (Report). Vol. 2. Edmonton, Alta.: Elections Alberta. pp. 124–127. ISBN 978-1-988620-12-1.

=== 2015 general election ===
2015 Alberta general election: Edmonton-Glenora
Party	Candidate	Votes	%	±%
New Democratic	Sarah Hoffman	12,473	68.45%	42.82%
Progressive Conservative	Heather Klimchuk	3,145	17.26%	-20.98%
Wildrose	Don Koziak	1,394	7.65%	-9.25%
Liberal	Karen Sevcik	553	3.03%	-7.29%
Alberta Party	Chris Vilcsak	463	2.54%	-6.37%
Green	David J. Parker	195	1.07%	–
Total		18,223	–	–
Rejected, spoiled and declined		72	46	14
Eligible electors / turnout		34,388	53.24%	-2.44%
New Democratic gain from Progressive Conservative		Swing		19.29%
Source(s) Source: "34 - Edmonton-Glenora, 2015 Alberta general election". officialresults.elections.ab.ca. Elections Alberta.
