= Rehmah Kasule =

Ugandan social entrepreneur

Founder of CEDA International

Personal details
- Born: 30 December 1971 (age 54) Gomba District
- Education: Makerere University (Bachelor of Fine Arts; Chartered Institute of Marketing (Post-Graduate Diploma in Marketing); Bradford University (Master of Arts in Peace, Conflict and Development)
- Occupation: Social entrepreneur and social worker
- Known for: Social entrepreneurship, social works
- Website: https://www.rehmahkasule.com/

Rehmah Kasule is a Ugandan social entrepreneur, public speaker and author. She is the founder of CEDA International a non-profit organization in Uganda.

== Background and education ==
She was born on 30 December 1971 in Gomba District. She attended Nabisunsa Girls School for both O level and A level. Kasule holds a Bachelor of Fine Arts Degree from Makerere University, a Post-Graduate Diploma in Marketing from the Chartered Institute of Marketing and a Master of Arts in Peace, Conflict and Development from Bradford University. She is a Senior Fellow of the Harvard Advanced Leadership Initiative, and holds other Fellowships from Aspen Institute Colorado, Synergos Institute, KAICIID Center for Inter religious Dialogue in Vienna, VVLead Fellow. She is a Certified Enterprise Management Development Advisor with International Trade Center, Geneva.

== Career ==
After her first degree, Kasule was hired as a Creative Assistant for Lowe Scanad in Uganda. Later on she joined Century Advertising Company for Uganda & Kenya, as a Branding & Marketing Executive (December 1997 – December 2000). Between January 2001 to September 2007, she served as the Founder & chief executive officer for Century Marketing (a Grey Worldwide Affiliate). She has served as a Consultant on Policy, Gender and Business Development. Such positions included Gender National Consultant for the gender mainstreaming of the National Export Strategy at International Trade Centre in Geneva (May 2008 – February 2009), National Consultant Gender & Communication Strategist at International Trade Centre Geneva (August 2010 – December 2010), as an Enterprise Expert Advisor for European Investment Bank & Integration Management Consultants (June 2012– May 2013). She also served as a Strategy, Policy and Private Sector Strategy Development Consultant for African Development Bank Group (December 2012 – June 2013).

In October 2007, she founded CEDA International a non-profit organization in Uganda where she served as the chief executive officer for ten years (October 2007 – August 2017) after she opted for an executive role for Strategic Advisor in the organization (December 2019 – December 2020). Through her leadership she empowered African youth and implemented projects such as the Rising Stars, Mentoring Walk and Youth Engaged Program impacting over 186,000 people. Between March 2021 to September 2021, Kasule worked as a Capacity Building Consultant for the MacArthur Foundation- Lever For Change, advising Bold Network Members on Strategy, Leadership, Communication & Gender. Currently she is partnering with the Mastercard Foundation as an Author and Knowledge Creator for COVID-19 Public Awareness Campaign, the African Narrative since August 2021. Kasule has also served as a Judge for the MacArthur Foundation 100 & Change, Harvard Venture Fund and Expert Review Panelist for W.K. Kellogg Foundation Racial Equality 2030 challenge awarding $90M for racial equity innovations. In 2010, she was recognized by President Barack Obama for mentoring and skilling youths and women. She has also received several awards such as the Islamic Development Bank Women in Peace & Development Prize, Goldman Sachs-Fortune Global Women's Leadership Award and named Africa's Most Influential Woman in Civil Society and Government.

== Publications ==
She has authored several books such as From Gomba to the White House,Zara & Mika Leading Change in the Community. She has co-authored Sheroes of COVID-19 a children's book and of recent published Leading Educational Change During a Pandemic with Fernando Reimers.

== Conferences ==
Kasule has participated and presented in various conferences such as; the African Business Conference 2020 at Harvard University Business School, 2019 Breaking the Mold Conference at Dartmouth College, 2019 African Economic Conference in El-Sharm Sheikh Egypt, 2019 African Development Conference at Harvard University Kennedy School, 2019 Design Lab – Massachusetts Institute of Technology, 2019 School of Communications Emerson College USA, 2019 Samuel Foundation Symposium On Social Isolation And Social Connectedness in Toronto Canada, 2019 Opportunity Collaboration Cancun Mexico, 2019 Comparative and International Education Society (CIES)in San Francisco, 2019 Commission on the Status of Women UN New York, 2019 United Nations Office on Genocide Prevention and Responsibility to Protect New York City, 2018 VV100 Women's Retreat San Francisco, 2018 United Nations Alliance of Civilization New York, 2018 Vital Voices Global Partnership Mentoring Walk UK, 2018 Platform of Action to prevent incitement that could lead to atrocity crimes and genocide in Vienna, 2017 Rotary Club of Washington DC, 2016 Global Summit on Religion, Peace and Security at UN Geneva Switzerland, 2016 One World Children's Fund, San Francisco-California, USA, 2014 Fortune Most Powerful Women's Summit in San Francisco-California, 2011 World Islamic Economic Forum Kazakhstan and the 2010 US State Department among other conferences

== Committee member/Affiliations ==
- Member, UN Women, Civil Society Regional Reference Group for Spotlight Africa Regional Programme (March 2021 to date)
- board of directors, World Connect, USA (July 2019 to date)
- Board of Trustee, Strong Minds, New York, USA (January 2019 to date)
- Executive board member, PANGEA Education Foundation, Chicago, USA (Jan 2019 to date)
- Member, The Organization of Islamic Cooperation, Think Tank-Peace, Mediation & Security (2016 to 2020)
- Chair Governing Council, Buganda Royal Institute for Technical and Business Education (2015 to 2018)
- Past President and Member of the Rotary Club of Kampala-Impala, Uganda (2013–2020)
- Board Member, Mansaray Foundation, Sierra Leone (January 2021 to date)
- Member, Parliament of Buganda Kingdom, Education & Gender Development (2011 to 2018)
- Advisory board member at Graça Machel Trust, New Faces New Voices (2015 to 2018)
- Member of Aspen Global Leadership Network (2010-to-date)
- Member of Network of leaders in Girls Education, The Obama Foundation (2017– to-date)
- Leader for Africa, VV100 Woman (2016– to-date)
- Former Advisory board member at New Faces New Voices (2012–2017)
- Member of the Partnership on Religion and Development (PaRD) Geneva, Switzerland (2017– to-date)
- Member of Network of leaders in Girls Education, Brookings Institution, Centre for Universal Education (2014–2016)
- Past President and Member of the Rotary Club of Kampala-Impala, Uganda (2013–2020)
- Global Ambassador – The International Alliance for Women
