= Lou Hyndman =

Canadian politician (1935–2013)

Lou Hyndman OC QC

Member of the Legislative Assembly of Alberta for Edmonton-Glenora Edmonton West (1967–1971)
- In office May 23, 1967 – May 8, 1986
- Preceded by: Stanley Geldart
- Succeeded by: Nancy MacBeth

Minister of Education
- In office September 10, 1971 – March 1975
- Preceded by: Robert Curtis Clark
- Succeeded by: Julian Koziak

Minister of Federal and Intergovernmental Affairs
- In office March 1975 – March 1979
- Preceded by: Don Getty
- Succeeded by: Archibald Johnston

Provincial Treasurer
- In office March 1979 – May 1986
- Preceded by: Merv Leitch
- Succeeded by: Archibald Johnston

Personal details
- Born: Louis Davies Hyndman; July 1, 1935 Edmonton, Alberta
- Died: November 24, 2013 (aged 78) Edmonton, Alberta
- Party: Progressive Conservative
- Education: University of Alberta
- Occupation: Lawyer

Louis Davies Hyndman, OC QC (July 1, 1935 – November 24, 2013) was a Canadian lawyer and politician from Alberta. He served as a Member of the Legislative Assembly of Alberta for 19 years and was a member of Premier Peter Lougheed and Don Getty's Cabinets. Hyndman was named the 15th Chancellor of the University of Alberta on June 10, 1994. From 1993 through 1996, he was Honorary Captain of the 4th Destroyer Squadron, Royal Canadian Navy.

== Early life ==
Louis Davies Hyndman was born in Edmonton, Alberta on July 1, 1935, to Louis Davis Hyndman Sr., Q.C. and Muriel MacKintosh. He was the grandson of James Hyndman CBE, an Edmonton Alderman and Supreme Court of Alberta Justice, as well as great-grandson of Sir Louis Henry Davies, former Premier of Prince Edward Island and Chief Justice of Canada. Hyndman attended the University of Alberta where he completed a Bachelor of Arts and Bachelor of Laws in 1959. He married Mary Evelyn Maclennan on June 2, 1962, and had three children together. Before entering politics he worked as a barrister and solicitor, Aide-de-camp to Lieutenant Governor of Alberta John Percy Page, Lieutenant in the Canadian Forces Naval Reserve, and executive assistant to Progressive Conservative Party of Canada Minister of Citizenship and Immigration Dick Bell.

Hyndman formed a life-long friendship with Jim Edwards, who went on to serve as a Member of Parliament for Edmonton from 1984 to 1993.

== Political career ==
Hyndman was an active member of the Progressive Conservative Party of Canada, and was set to participate in the 1959 party convention, however his work commitments required him to step away, Jim Edwards the alternate went in his place.

In 1965, Hyndman first met Peter Lougheed, who convinced Hyndman to run as a candidate for the provincial Progressive Conservative Party. Hyndman first ran for a seat in the Legislative Assembly of Alberta in the 1967 Alberta general election. He won a tight race in the electoral district of Edmonton West to pick it up for the Progressive Conservatives. Five other members of his party were elected that year. Together the six formed the official opposition.

Due to redistribution in the 1971 general election, the electoral district of Edmonton West was abolished. Hyndman ran for re-election in the new electoral district of Edmonton-Glenora. He was re-elected to the legislature with a sizable majority. The Progressive Conservatives under the leadership of Peter Lougheed formed government. Hyndman was appointed to the Executive Council of Alberta shortly after the election as Minister of Education.

Running for re-election as a cabinet minister in the 1975 general election, Hyndman slightly increased his popular vote. He won his district with a landslide as the opposition vote collapsed. Hyndman defeated future Member of the Legislative Assembly Alex McEachern and two other candidates. Immediately following the election Hyndman was shuffled to become the Minister of Federal and Intergovernmental Affairs.

He ran for his fourth term in office in the 1979 general election. Hyndman's popular vote waned slightly from the previous election. There was no significant strength in the opposition vote. He still won his district with a landslide majority. Lougheed appointed Hyndman as the new Provincial Treasurer following the election.

In Hyndman's fifth election he reclaimed the votes he had lost in 1979. He won his final term in office in the 1982 general election easily defeating three other candidates. Hyndman held the Provincial Treasurer portfolio after Don Getty became Premier in 1985. Hyndman retired from the legislature at dissolution in 1986.

During his 19-year career in the Alberta Legislature, Hyndman served as the Minister of Education, Minister of Federal and Intergovernmental Affairs, Government House Leader, and Provincial Treasurer.

== Late life ==
After leaving provincial politics in 1986 Hyndman joined the board of directors for TransAlta Utilities.

Hyndman also resumed his work as a lawyer with the firm now known as Field Law. He became chancellor of the University of Alberta.

He was awarded an honorary degree by the University on June 12, 2000.

Hyndman died November 24, 2013, in Edmonton at the age of 78, after an illness.

== Commissions ==
Hyndman chaired the:

- Premier's Commission on Future Health Care for Albertans (1987–1989)
- Royal Commission on a National Passenger System for Canada in the 21st Century (1989–1992)
- Canadian Safety and Accident Board Review Commission (1993)

== Louis D. Hyndman Sr. Lecture and Awards ==
Louis D. Hyndman Sr. Lecture and Awards, University of Alberta

== Honors ==
- Queen's Counsel (1975)
- Officer of the Order of Canada (1993)

== Affiliations ==
- Alberta Association of Children and Adults with Learning Disabilities
- Goodwill Rehabilitation Institute of Alberta
- CD Howe Institute
- Asia Pacific Foundation
