= Bruce Miller (politician) =

Canadian politician

Member of the Legislative Assembly of Alberta for Edmonton-Glenora
- In office November 22, 2004 – March 3, 2008
- Preceded by: Drew Hutton
- Succeeded by: Heather Klimchuk

Personal details
- Party: Alberta Liberal Party

Bruce Miller is a politician in Alberta, Canada and former member of the Legislative Assembly of Alberta for the constituency of Edmonton-Glenora. He was first elected on November 22, 2004, as a Liberal, but was defeated in his 2008 re-election bid by Progressive Conservative Heather Klimchuk.

He has had a notable career as a churchman, educator and community activist/advocate. He received the Queen's Jubilee award for community service in 2002. He co-founded the Alberta Quality of Life Commission in 1993, and served for many years as the vice-president of the Mahatma Gandhi Canadian Foundation for World Peace.

As MLA, Miller served as the Deputy Whip of the Liberal Caucus, and authored a paper on reforming Alberta's welfare system. He was also a member of the Alberta Government's affordable housing task force, which travelled throughout Alberta in 2007 researching the issue of housing.

Miller has also been an advocate for the communities of Edmonton-Glenora. He has presented before Edmonton City Council and the Edmonton Public School Board, representing communities facing major redevelopment projects and the possibility of school closures.

Miller has also served on the Conflicts of Interest Act Review Committee and the Alberta Legislature's Policy Field Committee on Managing Growth Pressures.

Dr. Miller graduated from Carleton University with the B.A. degree in 1963. His graduate degrees include: M.Div. (1966) from Westminster Theological Seminary in Philadelphia; S.T.M (1967) from Union Theological Seminary in New York, and the Ph.D. (1984) from the Divinity School of the University of Chicago. Dr. Miller also did doctoral studies at the Free University of Amsterdam in 1969–70.

From 1990 to the present he has been a Fellow of the Jesus Seminar, an international group of scholars focusing on the authentic words and deeds of Jesus.

From 2004 to the present he has been an Academic Advisor for Liberal Studies in the Faculty of Extension of the University of Alberta, and has taught courses such as "Will the real Jesus please stand up?" and "Symbols and Myths in Eastern Religions."

== Election results ==
=== 2008 general election ===
2008 Alberta general election: Edmonton-Glenora
Party	Candidate	Votes	%	±%
Progressive Conservative	Heather Klimchuk	4,604	39.90%	11.22%
Liberal	Bruce Miller	4,508	39.07%	3.94%
New Democratic	Arlene Chapman	1,743	15.11%	-15.81%
Green	Peter Johnston	408	3.54%	1.47%
Wildrose Alliance	Elden Van Hauwaert	275	2.38%	–
Total		11,538	–	–
Rejected, spoiled and declined		36	20	2
Eligible electors / turnout		27,266	42.46%	-14.11%
Progressive Conservative gain from Liberal		Swing		-1.69%
Source(s) Source: "31 - Edmonton-Glenora, 2008 Alberta general election". officialresults.elections.ab.ca. Elections Alberta. The Report on the March 3, 2008 Provincial General Election of the Twenty-seventh Legislative Assembly. Elections Alberta. July 28, 2008. pp. 294–297.

=== 2004 general election ===
2004 Alberta general election results		Turnout 56.72%		Swing	
Affiliation	Candidate	Votes	%	Party	Personal
Liberal	Bruce Miller	4,604	35.13%	-8.99%	
New Democratic	Larry Booi	4,052	30.92%	20.71%	
Progressive Conservative	Drew Hutton	3,759	28.68%	-16.99%	
Alberta Alliance	Blaine Currie	307	2.34%		
Green	Peter Johnston	271	2.07%	*	
Social Credit	Walter Schachenhofer	113	0.86%		
Total		13,106	100%		
Rejected, Spoiled and Declined		122			
23,320 Eligible Electors
Liberal pickup from Progressive Conservative				Swing -14.85%	
