= Edmonton-McClung =

Provincial electoral district in Alberta, Canada

Coordinates: 53.49°N 113.62°W

Alberta electoral district
- Edmonton-McClung within the City of Edmonton, 2017 boundaries

Provincial electoral district
- Legislature: Legislative Assembly of Alberta
MLA
Lorne Dach
New Democratic
- District created: 1993
- First contested: 1993
- Last contested: 2023

Edmonton-McClung is a provincial electoral district in Edmonton, Alberta, Canada. The district was created in 1993 and is named after Nellie McClung. The current MLA is Lorne Dach of the NDP, who was first elected in 2015.

== History ==
The electoral district was created in the 1993 boundary redistribution out of the southern portion of Edmonton-Meadowlark. The district underwent minor changes in 1997 and 2004 and changed significantly in the 2010 boundary redistribution when the portions of the district to the south and east of Anthony Henday drive were put in the new electoral district of Edmonton-South West.

=== Boundary history ===
35 Edmonton-McClung 2003 boundaries
Bordering districts
North	East	West	South
Edmonton-Meadowlark	Edmonton-Whitemud	Stony Plain	Stony Plain
riding map goes here			
Legal description from the Statutes of Alberta 2003, Electoral Divisions Act
Starting at the intersection of the west Edmonton city boundary with Whitemud Drive; then 1. east along Whitemud Drive to the left bank of the North Saskatchewan River; 2. generally southwest along the left bank of the North Saskatchewan River to the south Edmonton city boundary; 3. west and north along the Edmonton city boundary to the starting point.
Note:

38 Edmonton-McClung 2010 boundaries
Bordering districts
North	East	West	South
Edmonton-Meadowlark and Edmonton-Riverview	Edmonton-South West	Edmonton-Whitemud	Edmonton-Beverly-Clareview
Legal description from the Statutes of Alberta 2010, Electoral Divisions Act

=== Electoral history ===
Edmonton-McClung
Assembly	Years	Member	Party
Riding created from Edmonton-Meadowlark
23rd	1993–1997	Grant Mitchell	Liberal
24th	1997–1998	Grant Mitchell	Liberal
24th	1998–2001	Nancy MacBeth	Liberal
25th	2001–2004	Mark Norris	Progressive Conservative
26th	2004–2008	Mo Elsalhy	Liberal
27th	2008–2012	David Xiao	Progressive Conservative
28th	2012–2015	David Xiao	Progressive Conservative
29th	2015–2019	Lorne Dach	New Democratic
30th	2019–2023	Lorne Dach	New Democratic
31st	2023–Present	Lorne Dach	New Democratic

Edmonton-McClung was created in 1993. The first election held in the constituency was won by Incumbent Liberal candidate Grant Mitchell. Mitchell had previously served as Edmonton-Meadowlark MLA from 1986 to 1993. He became leader of the Liberals and of the official opposition after Laurence Decore stepped down in 1994. The 1997 election saw Mitchell re-elected with a smaller share of the vote and his provincial campaign dropped the Liberals seat count. He resigned as leader and later as an elected representative on May 11, 1998.

The 1998 by-election was held on June 17, 1998, very shortly after Mitchell vacated his seat. The constituency returned new Alberta Liberal leader Nancy MacBeth with over half the popular vote in the constituency. Macbeth had served in the legislature as a Progressive Conservative MLA in Edmonton-Glenora. She was defeated by Ralph Klein in the 1992 leadership vote for the Progressive Conservative party and quit the party completely after her term expired in 1993.

The 2001 election saw a bitter and personal provincial campaign launched by MacBeth against Klein. She was defeated in McClung by Progressive Conservative candidate Mark Norris and her party suffered significant losses in other districts in the province.

After the election Norris was rewarded for defeating MacBeth with an appointment to the provincial cabinet. He served from 2001 to 2004 as the Minister of Economic Development under Premier Ralph Klein. Norris ran for a second term in the 2004 election. He was defeated as the constituency returned to the Liberal column electing candidate Mo Elsalhy in a tight race. Norris was the only cabinet minister to lose his seat in that election.

The 2008 election saw the riding change hands again electing its fifth representative. The riding returned Progressive Conservative candidate David Xiao in another closely fought election over incumbent Elsalhy. The two were re-offering for a rematch in the 2012 election.

== Legislative election results ==
=== 1993 ===
1993 Alberta general election
Party	Candidate	Votes	%	±%
Liberal	Grant Mitchell	8,931	63.65%	–
Progressive Conservative	Henry Mah	4,177	29.77%	–
New Democratic	Denis Gautier-Villon	799	5.69%	–
Natural Law	Pat Simpson	125	0.89%	–
Total		14,032	–	–
Rejected, spoiled and declined		36	–	–
Eligible electors / turnout		23,184	60.68%	–
Liberal pickup new district.				
Source(s) Source: "Edmonton-McClung Official Results 1993 Alberta general election". Alberta Heritage Community Foundation.

=== 1997 ===
1997 Alberta general election
Party	Candidate	Votes	%	±%
Liberal	Grant Mitchell	6,322	49.02%	-14.63%
Progressive Conservative	Michael Mooney	5,259	40.78%	11.01%
New Democratic	Richard Vanderberg	713	5.53%	-0.17%
Social Credit	Patrick D. Ellis	542	4.20%	–
Natural Law	Wade McKinley	61	0.47%	-0.42%
Total		12,897	–	–
Rejected, spoiled and declined		19	15	1
Eligible electors / turnout		21,816	59.21%	-1.47%
Liberal hold		Swing		-12.82%
Source(s) Source: "Edmonton-McClung Official Results 1997 Alberta general election". Alberta Heritage Community Foundation. Alberta. Chief Electoral Officer (1997). Report of the Chief Electoral Officer, November, 1996 general enumeration and Tuesday, March 11, 1997 general election Twenty-fourth Legislative Assembly. Edmonton: Alberta Legislative Assembly, Office of the Chief Electoral Officer.

=== 1998 by-election ===
Alberta provincial by-election, June 17, 1998 Resignation of Grant Mitchell on May 11, 1998
Party	Candidate	Votes	%	±%
Liberal	Nancy MacBeth	5,040	53.58%	4.56%
Progressive Conservative	Michael Mooney	3,184	33.85%	-6.93%
Social Credit	Jon Dykstra	701	7.46%	3.26%
New Democratic	Carol Anne Dean	384	4.08%	-1.45%
Green	Karina Gregory	68	0.72%	–
Natural Law	Maury Shapka	29	0.31%	-0.11%
Total		9,406		
Rejected, spoiled and declined		10		
Eligible electors / turnout		23,094	%	
Liberal hold		Swing		+5.75%
Source(s) Source:

=== 2001 ===
2001 Alberta general election
Party	Candidate	Votes	%	±%
Progressive Conservative	Mark P. Norris	6,976	50.43%	16.58%
Liberal	Nancy J. MacBeth	5,920	42.80%	-10.78%
New Democratic	Lorne Dach	804	5.81%	1.73%
Independent	Patrick D. Ellis	133	0.96%	–
Total		13,833	–	–
Rejected, spoiled and declined		5	12	1
Eligible electors / turnout		24,723	55.98%	-3.23%
Progressive Conservative gain from Liberal		Swing		-0.30%
Source(s) Source: "Edmonton-McClung Official Results 2001 Alberta general election". Alberta Heritage Community Foundation. Alberta. Chief Electoral Officer (2001). The report of the Chief Electoral Officer on the 2000 provincial confirmation process and Monday, March 12, 2001, Provincial General Election of the twenty-fifth Legislative Assembly. Edmonton: Alberta Legislative Assembly, Office of the Chief Electoral Officer.

=== 2004 ===
2004 Alberta general election
Party	Candidate	Votes	%	±%
Liberal	Mo Elsalhy	5,859	44.88%	2.08%
Progressive Conservative	Mark P. Norris	5,333	40.85%	-9.58%
New Democratic	Lorne Dach	1,358	10.40%	4.59%
Alberta Alliance	Reuben Bauer	401	3.07%	–
Social Credit	Patrick Conlin	105	0.80%	–
Total		13,056	–	–
Rejected, spoiled and declined		36	30	5
Eligible electors / turnout		25,269	51.83%	-4.15%
Liberal gain from Progressive Conservative		Swing		-1.80%
Source(s) Source: "00 - Edmonton-McClung, 2004 Alberta general election". officialresults.elections.ab.ca. Elections Alberta. Alberta. Chief Electoral Officer (2005). Report of the Chief Electoral Officer on the General Enumeration and General Election of the Twenty-sixth Legislative Assembly (Report). Edmonton: Alberta Legislative Assembly, Office of the Chief Electoral Officer.

=== 2008 ===
2008 Alberta general election
Party	Candidate	Votes	%	±%
Progressive Conservative	David Xiao	7,173	48.94%	8.09%
Liberal	Mo Elsalhy	5,947	40.57%	-4.30%
New Democratic	Bridget Stirling	924	6.30%	-4.10%
Green	Bryan Wyrostok	342	2.33%	–
Wildrose Alliance	Kristine Jassman	272	1.86%	-1.21%
Total		14,658	–	–
Rejected, spoiled and declined		7	39	0
Eligible electors / turnout		32,587	45.00%	-6.83%
Progressive Conservative gain from Liberal		Swing		2.17%
Source(s) Source: "35 - Edmonton-McClung, 2008 Alberta general election". officialresults.elections.ab.ca. Elections Alberta. Chief Electoral Officer (2008). The Report on the March 3, 2008 Provincial General Election of the Twenty-Seventh Legislative Assembly (Report). Edmonton, Alta.: Elections Alberta.

=== 2012 ===
2012 Alberta general election
Party	Candidate	Votes	%	±%
Progressive Conservative	David Xiao	7,287	46.46%	-2.48%
Liberal	Mo Elsalhy	3,856	24.58%	-15.99%
Wildrose Alliance	Peter Janisz	2,840	18.11%	16.25%
New Democratic	Lorne Dach	1,172	7.47%	1.17%
Alberta Party	John Hudson	423	2.70%	–
Evergreen	Nathan Forsyth	107	0.68%	-1.65%
Total		15,685	–	–
Rejected, spoiled and declined		65	44	7
Eligible electors / turnout		27,238	57.85%	12.85%
Progressive Conservative hold		Swing		6.76%
Source(s) Source: "38 - Edmonton-McClung, 2012 Alberta general election". officialresults.elections.ab.ca. Elections Alberta. Chief Electoral Officer (2012). The Report of the Chief Electoral Officer on the 2011 Provincial Enumeration and Monday, April 23, 2012 Provincial General Election of the Twenty-eighth Legislative Assembly (PDF) (Report). Edmonton, Alta.: Elections Alberta. Archived (PDF) from the original on May 6, 2021.

=== 2015 ===
2015 Alberta general election
Party	Candidate	Votes	%	±%
New Democratic	Lorne Dach	9,412	55.36%	47.89%
Progressive Conservative	David Xiao	4,408	25.93%	-20.53%
Wildrose	Steve Thompson	2,373	13.96%	-4.15%
Alberta Party	John Hudson	808	4.75%	2.06%
Total		17,001	–	–
Rejected, spoiled and declined		65	26	20
Eligible electors / turnout		31,612	54.05%	-3.80%
New Democratic gain from Progressive Conservative		Swing		34.36%
Source(s) Source: "38 - Edmonton-McClung, 2015 Alberta general election". officialresults.elections.ab.ca. Elections Alberta. Chief Electoral Officer (2016). 2015 General Election. A Report of the Chief Electoral Officer (PDF) (Report). Edmonton, Alta.: Elections Alberta.

=== 2019 ===
2019 Alberta general election
Party	Candidate	Votes	%	±%
New Democratic	Lorne Dach	8,073	43.63%	-11.73%
United Conservative	Laurie Mozeson	6,640	35.89%	-4.00%
Alberta Party	Stephen Mandel	3,601	19.46%	14.71%
Alberta Advantage	Gordon Perrott	188	1.02%	–
Total		18,502	–	–
Rejected, spoiled and declined		109	47	12
Eligible electors / turnout		28,961	64.30%	10.25%
New Democratic hold		Swing		-10.84%
Source(s) Source: "36 - Edmonton-McClung, 2019 Alberta general election". officialresults.elections.ab.ca. Elections Alberta. Alberta. Chief Electoral Officer (2019). 2019 General Election. A Report of the Chief Electoral Officer. Volume II (PDF) (Report). Vol. 2. Edmonton, Alta.: Elections Alberta. pp. 140–143. ISBN 978-1-988620-12-1.

=== 2023 ===
2023 Alberta general election
Party	Candidate	Votes	%	±%
New Democratic	Lorne Dach	9,603	59.50	+15.87
United Conservative	Daniel Heikkinen	6,029	37.35	+1.47
Independent	Andrew J. Lineker	309	1.91	–
Green	Terry Syvenky	199	1.23	–
Total		16,140	99.19	–
Rejected and declined		131	0.81	
Turnout		16,272	56.13	
Eligible voters		28,991		
New Democratic hold		Swing		+7.20
Source(s) Source: Elections Alberta

== Senate nominee election results ==
=== 2004 ===
2004 Senate nominee election results: Edmonton-McClung				Turnout 44.33%	
Affiliation	Candidate	Votes	% votes	% ballots	Rank
Progressive Conservative	Betty Unger	5,279	18.08%	55.08%	2
Independent	Link Byfield	3,587	12.28%	37.43%	4
Progressive Conservative	Bert Brown	3,446	11.80%	35.96%	1
Progressive Conservative	Cliff Breitkreuz	3,186	10.91%	33.24%	3
Progressive Conservative	David Usherwood	2,594	8.88%	27.07%	6
Alberta Alliance	Michael Roth	2,493	8.54%	26.01%	7
Independent	Tom Sindlinger	2,409	8.25%	25.14%	9
Progressive Conservative	Jim Silye	2,205	7.55%	23.01%	5
Alberta Alliance	Gary Horan	2,031	6.96%	21.91%	10
Alberta Alliance	Vance Gough	1,973	6.75%	20.59%	8
Total votes		29,203	100%		
Total ballots		9,584	3.05 votes per ballot		
Rejected, spoiled and declined		3,552			

Voters had the option of selecting four candidates on the ballot.

== Nomination contests ==
UCP Edmonton-McClung nomination contest: February 10, 2023

Candidate	Votes	%
Danny Heikkinen	110	50.5
Terry Vankka	108	49.5
Total	218	100.0

== Student vote results ==
Participating schools
Archbishop Oscar Romero High School
Callingwood School
Centennial Elementary
Ormsby School
Rio Terrace School
S. Bruce Smith Junior High
Talmud Torah School

On November 19, 2004, a student vote was conducted at participating Alberta schools to parallel the 2004 Alberta general election results. The vote was designed to educate students and simulate the electoral process for persons who had not yet reached the legal majority. The vote was conducted in 80 of the 83 provincial electoral districts with students voting for actual election candidates. Schools with a large student body that reside in another electoral district had the option to vote for candidates outside of the electoral district than where they were physically located.

2004 Alberta student vote results
Affiliation	Candidate	Votes	%
Progressive Conservative	Mark Norris	347	36.07%
Liberal	Mo Elsalhy	335	34.82%
NDP	Lorne Dach	176	18.30%
Alberta Alliance	Reuben Bauer	69	7.17%
Social Credit	Patrick Conlin	35	3.64%
Total		962	100%
Rejected, spoiled and declined		80	

=== 2012 ===
2012 Alberta student vote results
Affiliation	Candidate	Votes	%
Progressive Conservative	David Xiao		%
Wildrose	Peter Janisz		
Liberal	Mo Elsalhy		%
Alberta Party	John Hudson		
NDP	Lorne Dach		%
Total			100%

== See also ==
- List of Alberta provincial electoral districts
- Canadian provincial electoral districts
