= Howard Sapers =

Canadian politician

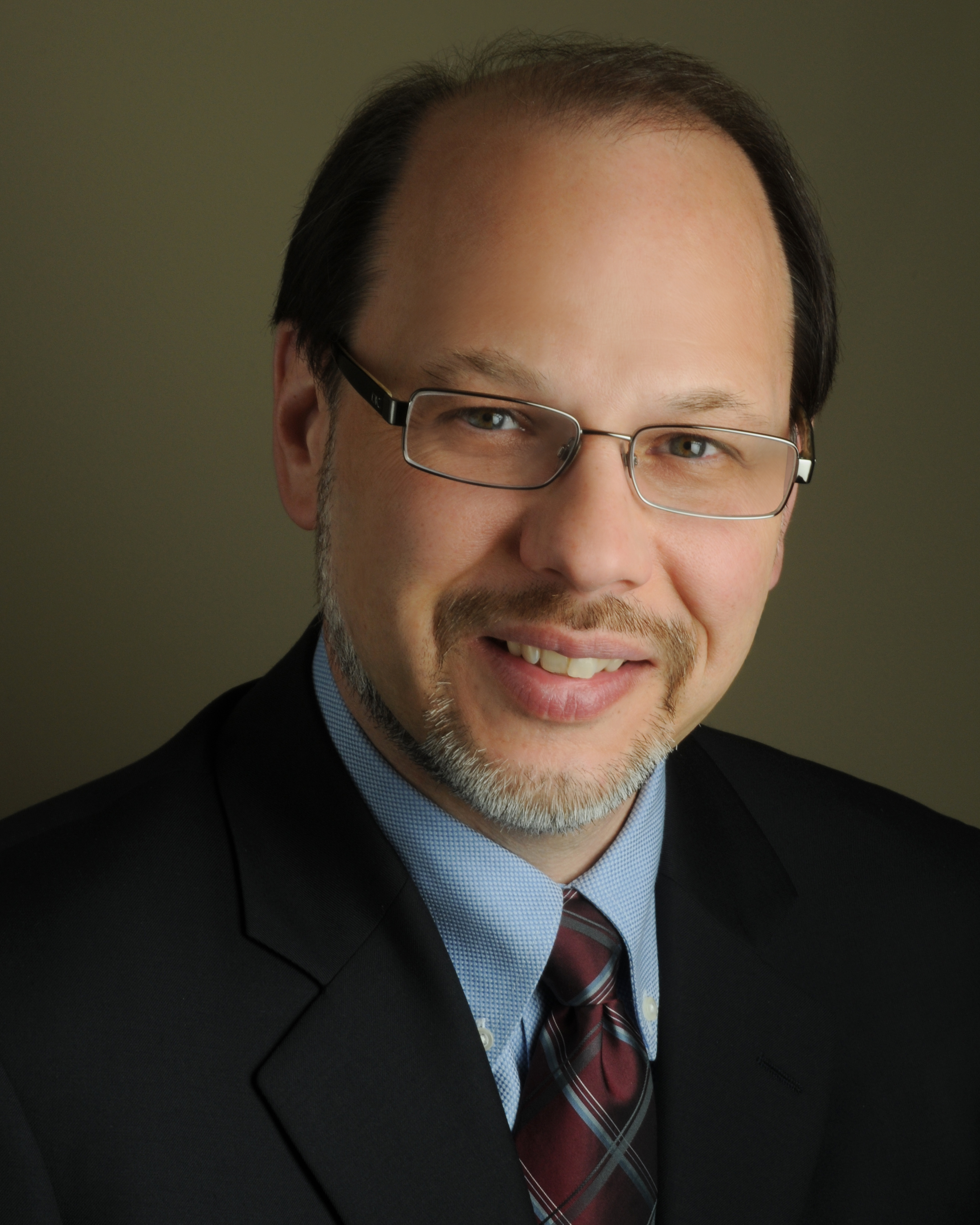

Leader of the Official Opposition in Alberta
- In office April 17, 1998 – July 6, 1998
- Preceded by: Grant Mitchell
- Succeeded by: Nancy MacBeth

Member of the Legislative Assembly of Alberta for Edmonton-Glenora
- In office 1993–2001
- Preceded by: Nancy MacBeth
- Succeeded by: Drew Hutton

Personal details
- Born: Howard Sapers; November 24, 1957 (age 68) Toronto, Ontario
- Party: Liberal (1993-2001)

Howard Sapers (born November 24, 1957) is a Canadian public policy expert, currently working as executive director of the Canadian Civil Liberties Association. He has worked as a policy consultant and subject matter expert. His engagements have included advising governments on corrections reform, oversight mechanisms, use of force and solitary confinement. Between January 1, 2017 and December 31, 2018, he was as appointed as the Independent Advisor on Corrections Reform to the Ontario provincial government, having previously served as the Correctional Investigator of Canada from 2004 to 2016, public servant and former provincial politician from Alberta, Canada. He served as a member of the Legislative Assembly of Alberta, representing Edmonton-Glenora from 1993 until 2001. He was born in Toronto, Ontario.

== Political career ==
Sapers was first elected to the Alberta Legislature in the 1993 Alberta general election. He won a large plurality defeating five other candidates. The race was primarily contested between Sapers and Progressive Conservative candidate Gwen Harris. Sapers beat Harris by a margin of 2600 votes to win the Edmonton-Glenora electoral district.

Sapers held many portfolios in the Official Opposition including critic for Health, Advanced Education, Science and Technology and Finance. He served on the Alberta Heritage Savings Trust Fund Committee, the Legislative Offices Committee and the Public Accounts Committee. He was one of three opposition members appointed by the Klein government to serve on the Select Committee studying privacy and access to information. During his second term, Sapers was Official Opposition House Leader. Sapers served as interim Leader of the Opposition after Grant Mitchell resigned in 1998.

On March 19, 1996 Sapers along with Liberal leader Grant Mitchell were sued by a company called Hotel de Health. After the company CEO, Robert Talbot, believed that the member made defamatory remarks after the company investigated building and operating private hospitals in Alberta. The lawsuit was without merit and mirrored Talbot's pattern of launching vexatious lawsuits.

Sapers was well liked in his constituency and would win his second term in office a year after he cemented his reputation for protecting public healthcare in his dispute with Hotel de Health.1997 Alberta general election. That race was hotly contested with Sapers defeating Progressive Conservative Kim MacKenzie and three other candidates by almost 1400 votes.

In November 1999, Sapers referred his legal defence arrangements to the Legislature Ethics Commissioner. Robert Clark This decision was made as a result of the recent conclusion Clark reached regarding the financing of a defense fund established in support of Stockwell Day, who was facing his own legal difficulties. While Sapers was eventually found to have breached the Conflict of Interest Act, Clark recommended that there be no punishment, as Sapers had acted on bad advice from the Clerk's Office and the Treasury Risk Management Fund was not made available to him as it had been made available to Day.

He would be defeated by fewer than 150 votes in his bid for a third term in office by Drew Hutton in the 2001 Alberta general election.

== Public service ==
After being defeated Sapers worked for the National Crime Prevention Centre and was then appointed Vice Chair of the National Parole Board for the Prairie Region. In April 2004 he was appointed by the federal government to be the ombudsmen for federal offenders for a five-year term. In this position he reports annually to Parliament with recommendations aimed at improving corrections in Canada. His appointment was renewed on February 17, 2012, and continued into November 2016 when he resigned his position as the Correctional Investigator to take office with the Ontario government. He is currently a member of the Center for Addiction and Mental Health Board of Trustees.

Legislative Assembly of Alberta
Preceded by Nancy MacBeth	MLA Edmonton-Glenora; 1993-2001	Succeeded by Drew Hutton
