= David Xiao =

Canadian businessman and politician

- 肖辉 / 蕭輝
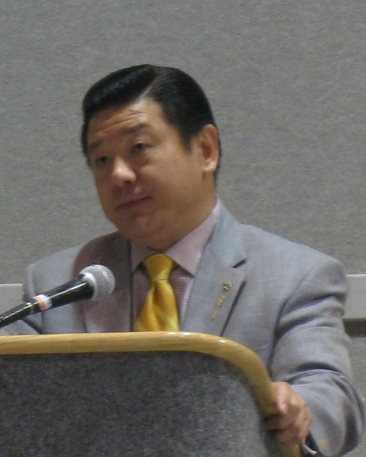

MLA for Edmonton-McClung
- In office March 3, 2008 – May 5, 2015
- Preceded by: Mo Elsalhy
- Succeeded by: Lorne Dach

Personal details
- Born: November 17, 1960 (age 65) Guizhou Province, China
- Party: Progressive Conservative
- Spouse: Alice
- Children: Allen and Andrew
- Occupation: Businessperson

David Hui Xiao (born November 17, 1960) is a Canadian businessman and politician. From 2008 to 2015 he was Member of the Legislative Assembly of Alberta, representing the constituency of Edmonton-McClung as a Progressive Conservative.

== Early life ==
Xiao was born in Guizhou Province in southwest China. His father was an accountant in the coal mining industry and his mother was a teacher. After graduating with a Bachelor of Arts in English literature from the Beijing Second Foreign Language University, Xiao began working as a translator and eventually got into business, which gave him the opportunity to travel to Canada. He moved his family to Edmonton during the Tiananmen Square Protests of 1989, seeking freedom and opportunity.

In Canada, Xiao was a successful entrepreneur before entering public life, working in consulting, international trade, publishing, commercial real estate and marketing. As a business consultant, Xiao worked with some of the world's biggest companies, including Nortel, Bombardier, Motorola, and various Canadian publishing companies. In addition to the BA in English literature, Xiao has a diploma in geological science from the Beijing Institute of Mining. He has also studied business through NAIT and economics at the University of Alberta.

== Political career ==
Xiao has spent a great deal of time trying to get elected to the federal government. He sought the Conservative Party nomination in several ridings on a number of occasions. Having been unsuccessful in all his federal attempts, Xiao turned his attention to provincial politics. Xiao first sought public office in the 2008 provincial election in the constituency of Edmonton-McClung. In that election, Xiao defeated first-term Liberal incumbent Mo Elsalhy by 1226 votes to win the riding. After the election, he was named Parliamentary Assistant to the Minister of Employment and Immigration, Hector Goudreau. Politically, Xiao has been a member of the federal Reform and Canadian Alliance parties, and served on the Edmonton-Leduc board of directors for the Conservative Party of Canada.

On October 10, 2014, Xiao was disqualified by the Conservative Party of Canada from running for its nomination for the 2015 federal election in Edmonton West. The Party gave no reasons for their decision.

On July 18, 2017, David Xiao submitted his paperwork in order to run for Edmonton City Council In Ward 5 in Edmonton's Municipal Election on October 16, 2017.

== Controversy ==
Xiao has been subject to criticism for hefty travel expenses. Xiao, whose constituency office is 13 km from the Alberta Legislature, claimed travel expenses of nearly $35,000 in 2012 alone. Xiao claimed most of the expenses were for travel to Calgary and other neighbouring cities as he was the Parliamentary Assistant to the Minister of Transportation.

== Personal life ==
Xiao is married to Alice and together they have two sons, Allen and Andrew. He also considers himself a tea connoisseur. He collects tea pots and enjoys cooking.

== Election results ==
2008 Alberta general election results ( Edmonton-McClung )		Turnout 45.8%	
Affiliation	Candidate	Votes	%
Progressive Conservative	David Xiao	7,159	49%
Liberal	Mo Elsalhy	5,943	41%
NDP	Bridget Stirling	924	6%
Green	Bryan Wyrostok	342	2%
Wildrose Alliance	Jassman Kristine	270	2%
Total		14,638	100%
