= Edmonton West (provincial electoral district) =

Defunct provincial electoral district in Alberta, Canada

Coordinates: 53.55°N 113.41°W

Alberta electoral district

Defunct provincial electoral district
- Legislature: Legislative Assembly of Alberta
- District created: 1917
- District abolished: 1921
- District re-created: 1963
- District re-abolished: 1971
- First contested: 1917
- Last contested: 1967

Edmonton West stylized as Edmonton (West) from 1917 to 1921, was a provincial electoral district in Alberta, Canada, mandated to return a single member to the Legislative Assembly of Alberta from 1917 to 1921 and again from 1963 to 1971.

== History ==
The riding has existed twice, the first incarnation was created in 1917 when the Edmonton electoral district broke up into Edmonton East and Edmonton West electoral districts. The two districts were merged along with Edmonton South in 1921 to reform the Edmonton electoral district.

The second incarnation was carved out of the south portion of Edmonton North West in 1963. In 1971 the riding was renamed Edmonton-Glenora.

=== Members of the Legislative Assembly (MLAs) ===
Members of the Legislative Assembly for Edmonton West
Assembly	Years	Member	Party
See Edmonton electoral district from 1905-1917
4th	1917–1921	Albert Ewing	Conservative
See Edmonton electoral district from 1921-1959 and Edmonton North West electoral district from 1959-1963
15th	1963–1967	Stanley Geldart	Social Credit
16th	1967–1971	Lou Hyndman	Progressive Conservative
See Edmonton-Glenora electoral district from 1971-Present

== Election results ==
=== 1917 ===
1917 Alberta general election
Party	Candidate	Votes	%	±%
Conservative	Albert Ewing	3,776	56.70%	–
Liberal	William Thomas Henry	2,884	43.30%	–
Total		6,660	–	–
Rejected, spoiled and declined		N/A	–	–
Eligible electors / turnout		N/A	N/A	–
Conservative pickup new district.				
Source(s) Source: "Edmonton-West Official Results 1917 Alberta general election". Alberta Heritage Community Foundation.

=== 1963 ===
1963 Alberta general election
Party	Candidate	Votes	%	±%
Social Credit	Stanley Geldart	3,733	41.90%	–
Liberal	Robert A. Doyle	2,572	28.87%	–
Progressive Conservative	Tony Nugent	2,019	22.66%	–
New Democratic	Neil R. Larsen	585	6.57%	–
Total		8,909	–	–
Rejected, spoiled and declined		16	–	–
Eligible electors / turnout		15,780	56.56%	–
Social Credit pickup new district.				
Source(s) Source: "Edmonton-West Official Results 1963 Alberta general election". Alberta Heritage Community Foundation.

=== 1967 ===
1967 Alberta general election
Party	Candidate	Votes	%	±%
Progressive Conservative	Lou Hyndman	4,753	38.52%	15.86%
Social Credit	William A. Johnson	4,016	32.55%	-9.35%
Liberal	J. Bernard Feeham	2,316	18.77%	-10.10%
New Democratic	Thomas C. Pocklington	1,254	10.16%	3.60%
Total		12,339	–	–
Rejected, spoiled and declined		32	–	–
Eligible electors / turnout		17,151	72.13%	15.57%
Progressive Conservative gain from Social Credit		Swing		-3.53%
Source(s) Source: "Edmonton-West Official Results 1967 Alberta general election". Alberta Heritage Community Foundation.

== See also ==
- List of Alberta provincial electoral districts
- Canadian provincial electoral districts
- Edmonton West
