= Drew Hutton (politician) =

Canadian politician (1953–2014)

MLA for Edmonton-Glenora
- In office 2001–2004
- Preceded by: Howard Sapers
- Succeeded by: Bruce Miller

Personal details
- Born: October 8, 1953
- Died: August 18, 2014 (aged 60) Edmonton, Alberta
- Party: Progressive Conservative Association of Alberta

Andrew Hutton (October 8, 1953 – August 18, 2014) was provincial level politician from Alberta, Canada. He served as a member of the Legislative Assembly of Alberta from 2001 until 2004.

== Political career ==
Hutton was first elected to the Alberta Legislature in the 2001 Alberta general election. He defeated incumbent Howard Sapers to pick up the Edmonton-Glenora electoral district for the Progressive Conservatives.

Hutton focused his time in office on improving education in Edmonton by holding a series of open forums at Edmonton area schools. He held the forums in an attempt to lobby the provincial government for more money to improve programs and school infrastructure. He also gave a 2 million dollar cheque to the YMCA Edmonton with funds raised through Alberta Lotteries.

Hutton ran for a second term in the 2004 Alberta general election but was defeated by Bruce Miller a candidate of the Alberta Liberals. He died on August 18, 2014, after an illness.

Legislative Assembly of Alberta
Preceded by Howard Sapers	MLA Edmonton-Glenora; 2001–2004	Succeeded by Bruce Miller
