= Edmonton-Glenora =

Provincial electoral district in Alberta, Canada

Coordinates: 53.56°N 113.56°W

Alberta electoral district
- Edmonton-Glenora within the City of Edmonton, 2017 boundaries

Provincial electoral district
- Legislature: Legislative Assembly of Alberta
MLA
Sarah Hoffman
New Democratic
- District created: 1971
- First contested: 1971
- Last contested: 2023

Edmonton-Glenora is a provincial electoral district for the Legislative Assembly of Alberta, Canada. It is located north of the North Saskatchewan River in Edmonton. The electoral district, as defined by the Electoral Divisions Act, 2003, encompasses an area that includes, in addition to the neighbourhood of Glenora, the neighbourhoods of Britannia Youngstown, Canora, Grovenor, High Park, Inglewood, Mayfield, McQueen, North Glenora, Prince Charles, Westmount, and Woodcroft as well.

== History ==
The electoral district was created in the 1971 boundary redistribution primarily out of the old Edmonton West district.

The 2010 boundary redistribution saw the riding significantly change boundaries on its northern and western sides. The northern boundary was shifted from 118 Avenue to Yellowhead Trail in land that was part of Edmonton-Calder. The western boundary which previously ran along 170 Street now runs north east along Mayfield Road to 111 Ave and then runs North on 149 Street ceding a large portion of land to Edmonton-Meadowlark.

=== Boundary history ===
31 Edmonton-Glenora 2003 boundaries
Bordering districts
North	East	West	South
Edmonton-Calder	Edmonton-Calder, Edmonton-Centre	Edmonton-Calder	Edmonton-Meadowlark, Edmonton-Riverview
riding map goes here			
Legal description from the Statutes of Alberta 2003, Electoral Divisions Act.
Starting at the intersection of 170 Street with 118 Avenue; then 1. east along 118 Avenue to the northerly extension of 121 Street; 2. south along the extension and 121 Street to Stony Plain Road; 3. northwest along Stony Plain Road to 124 Street; 4. south along 124 Street and its southerly extension to Victoria Park Road; 5. southwesterly along Victoria Park Road to the left bank of the North Saskatchewan River at Groat Road Bridge; 6. west along the left bank of the North Saskatchewan River to MacKinnon Ravine; 7. northwest along MacKinnon Ravine to Stony Plain Road at 148 Street; 8. west along Stony Plain Road to the north bound lanes of 170 Street; 9. north along the north bound lanes of 170 Street to the starting point.
Note:

34 Edmonton-Glenora 2010 boundaries
Bordering districts
North	East	West	South
Edmonton-Calder	Edmonton-Calder and Edmonton-Centre	Edmonton-Meadowlark	Edmonton-Riverview
Legal description from the Statutes of Alberta 2010, Electoral Divisions Act.

=== Representation history ===
Members of the Legislative Assembly for Edmonton-Glenora
Assembly	Years	Member	Party
See Edmonton West 1963-1971
17th	1971–1975	Lou Hyndman	Progressive Conservative
18th	1975–1979	Lou Hyndman	Progressive Conservative
19th	1979–1982	Lou Hyndman	Progressive Conservative
20th	1982–1986	Lou Hyndman	Progressive Conservative
21st	1986–1989	Nancy MacBeth	Progressive Conservative
22nd	1989–1993	Nancy MacBeth	Progressive Conservative
23rd	1993–1997	Howard Sapers	Liberal
24th	1997–2001	Howard Sapers	Liberal
25th	2001–2004	Drew Hutton	Progressive Conservative
26th	2004–2008	Bruce Miller	Liberal
27th	2008–2012	Heather Klimchuk	Progressive Conservative
28th	2012–2015	Heather Klimchuk	Progressive Conservative
29th	2015–2019	Sarah Hoffman	New Democratic
30th	2019–2023	Sarah Hoffman	New Democratic
31st	2023–	Sarah Hoffman	New Democratic

The electoral district was created in the 1971 boundary redistribution from the old riding of Edmonton West. That electoral district first elected a Social Credit MLA when it was created in 1963 and elected Progressive Conservative candidate Lou Hyndman to his first term in 1967.

The first election held in 1971 in the district saw Hyndman run for his second term in office. He would win a near landslide taking almost 60% of the popular vote in a very high turnout that hasn't been equaled since with over 80% of electors coming out to vote. His party would form government and Hyndman would be appointed to cabinet in the government of Peter Lougheed.

Hyndman would win his third term in office with the highest percentage of popular vote in his career in the 1975 election. He would defeat future NDP MLA Alex McEachern taking almost 75% of the popular vote. Hyndman would go on to serve two more terms in office. He would keep his cabinet post in the final year of his fifth term when Premier Don Getty came to power and retired from office at dissolution of the assembly in 1986.

The second representative for the riding was Progressive Conservative Nancy MacBeth who won her first election in 1986 with just over half the popular vote. She would be appointed to cabinet in her first term under Premier Don Getty and serve in cabinet until 1992. MacBeth ran for a second term in 1989 and won a second term with a slightly reduced majority. She decided to run for leadership of the Progressive Conservative party in 1992. She waged a tough battle against Ralph Klein but was defeated. Macbeth did not return to cabinet when Klein came to power and did not run for re-election in 1993.

The Alberta Liberal party surged on a wave of support in Edmonton in the 1993 general election that saw the party sweep every seat. Glenora chose Liberal candidate Howard Sapers as the third MLA for the riding. He would be re-elected to a second term with a reduced majority in 1997 and defeated on a bid for his third term in 2001.

Drew Hutton became the first candidate in the riding to knock out a sitting incumbent. He won office in the 2001 election under the Progressive Conservative banner. Hutton only lasted a term in office before losing his seat back to the Liberals in 2004.

The 2004 election was an electoral anomaly. Liberal candidate Bruce Miller won the district despite his party losing 9 points from the last election. Incumbent Drew Hutton finished a distant third while NDP candidate Larry Booi who surged into second place with a record level of support under the NDP banner.

Miller was defeated in the 2008 election despite gaining popular support since being elected in 2004. He was defeated by Progressive Conservative candidate Heather Klimchuck who benefited from the collapse of the NDP vote to surge past Miller. After being elected Klimchuck was appointed to cabinet by Premier Ed Stelmach in 2008.

== Legislative election results ==
=== 1971 ===
1971 Alberta general election
Party	Candidate	Votes	%	±%
Progressive Conservative	Lou Hyndman	7,661	59.70%	–
Social Credit	Lou Letourneau	4,001	31.18%	–
New Democratic	Mary Lou Pocklington	848	6.61%	–
Liberal	Sol Estrin	322	2.51%	–
Total		12,832	–	–
Rejected, spoiled and declined		37	–	–
Eligible electors / Turnout		16,077	80.05%	–
Progressive Conservative pickup new district.				
Source(s) Source: "Edmonton-Glenora Official Results 1971 Alberta general election". Alberta Heritage Community Foundation.

=== 1975 ===
1975 Alberta general election
Party	Candidate	Votes	%	±%
Progressive Conservative	Lou Hyndman	7,735	74.39%	14.69%
New Democratic	Alex McEachern	1,837	17.67%	11.06%
Social Credit	Al Opstad	782	7.52%	-23.66%
Constitutional Socialist	William Askin	44	0.42%	–
Total		10,398	–	–
Rejected, spoiled and declined		35	–	–
Eligible electors / Turnout		17,902	58.28%	-21.77%
Progressive Conservative hold		Swing		14.10%
Source(s) Source: "Edmonton-Glenora Official Results 1975 Alberta general election". Alberta Heritage Community Foundation.

=== 1979 ===
1979 Alberta general election
Party	Candidate	Votes	%	±%
Progressive Conservative	Lou Hyndman	6,597	61.47%	-12.92%
New Democratic	Doug Trace	1,838	17.13%	-0.54%
Social Credit	Patrice Taylor	1,330	12.39%	4.87%
Liberal	David Panar	967	9.01%	–
Total		10,732	–	–
Rejected, spoiled and declined		43	–	–
Eligible electors / Turnout		18,175	59.28%	1.01%
Progressive Conservative hold		Swing		-6.19%
Source(s) Source: "Edmonton-Glenora Official Results 1979 Alberta general election". Alberta Heritage Community Foundation.

=== 1982 ===
1982 Alberta general election
Party	Candidate	Votes	%	±%
Progressive Conservative	Lou Hyndman	7,724	61.98%	0.51%
New Democratic	H.D. (Tony) Smith	2,555	20.50%	3.38%
Western Canada Concept	Fred Marshall	1,649	13.23%	–
Liberal	Jerry Paschen	534	4.29%	-4.73%
Total		12,462	–	–
Rejected, spoiled and declined		20	–	–
Eligible electors / Turnout		17,928	69.62%	10.34%
Progressive Conservative hold		Swing		-1.43%
Source(s) Source: "Edmonton-Glenora Official Results 1982 Alberta general election". Alberta Heritage Community Foundation.

=== 1986 ===
1986 Alberta general election
Party	Candidate	Votes	%	±%
Progressive Conservative	Nancy Betkowski	5,193	52.41%	-9.57%
New Democratic	Jim Bell	2,918	29.45%	8.95%
Liberal	Colin P. McDonald	1,352	13.65%	9.36%
Representative	C.A. Douglas Ringrose	312	3.15%	–
Western Canada Concept	Alice Elaine Moody	133	1.34%	-11.89%
Total		9,908	–	–
Rejected, spoiled and declined		16	–	–
Eligible electors / Turnout		18,705	53.06%	-16.57%
Progressive Conservative hold		Swing		-9.26%
Source(s) Source: "Edmonton-Glenora Official Results 1986 Alberta general election". Alberta Heritage Community Foundation.

=== 1989 ===
1989 Alberta general election
Party	Candidate	Votes	%	±%
Progressive Conservative	Nancy Betkowski	5,128	47.60%	-4.81%
Liberal	Hal Annett	2,935	27.25%	13.60%
New Democratic	George Millar	2,709	25.15%	-4.30%
Total		10,772	–	–
Rejected, spoiled and declined		24	–	–
Eligible electors / Turnout		18,157	59.46%	6.40%
Progressive Conservative hold		Swing		-1.30%
Source(s) Source: "Edmonton-Glenora Official Results 1989 Alberta general election". Alberta Heritage Community Foundation.

=== 1993 ===
1993 Alberta general election
Party	Candidate	Votes	%	±%
Liberal	Howard Sapers	7,745	50.22%	22.97%
Progressive Conservative	Gwen Harris	5,150	33.39%	-14.21%
New Democratic	Arlene Young	1,874	12.15%	-13.00%
Social Credit	Trevor Blinston	301	1.95%	–
Confederation of Regions	Pat Nelson	231	1.50%	–
Natural Law	Paula Johnsen	122	0.79%	–
Total		15,423	–	–
Rejected, spoiled and declined		36	–	–
Eligible electors / Turnout		24,456	63.21%	3.75%
Liberal gain from Progressive Conservative		Swing		-1.77%
Source(s) Source: "Edmonton-Glenora Official Results 1993 Alberta general election". Alberta Heritage Community Foundation.

=== 1997 ===
1997 Alberta general election
Party	Candidate	Votes	%	±%
Liberal	Howard Sapers	5,785	48.01%	-2.21%
Progressive Conservative	Kim MacKenzie	4,368	36.25%	2.86%
New Democratic	Arlene Young	1,198	9.94%	-2.21%
Social Credit	Jon Dykstra	630	5.23%	3.28%
Natural Law	Sam Thomas	69	0.57%	-0.22%
Total		12,050	–	–
Rejected, spoiled and declined		20	21	3
Eligible electors / Turnout		21,183	56.99%	-6.22%
Liberal hold		Swing		-2.53%
Source(s) Source: "Edmonton-Glenora Official Results 1997 Alberta general election". Alberta Heritage Community Foundation.

=== 2001 ===
2001 Alberta general election
Party	Candidate	Votes	%	±%
Progressive Conservative	Drew Hutton	5,515	45.67%	9.42%
Liberal	Howard Sapers	5,328	44.12%	-3.88%
New Democratic	Guy Desrosiers	1,232	10.20%	0.26%
Total		12,075	–	–
Rejected, spoiled and declined		23	19	4
Eligible electors / Turnout		21,343	56.70%	-0.29%
Progressive Conservative gain from Liberal		Swing		-5.11%
Source(s) Source: "Edmonton-Glenora Official Results 2001 Alberta general election". Alberta Heritage Community Foundation.

=== 2004 ===
2004 Alberta general election
Party	Candidate	Votes	%	±%
Liberal	Bruce Miller	4,604	35.13%	-9.00%
New Democratic	Larry Booi	4,052	30.92%	20.71%
Progressive Conservative	Drew Hutton	3,759	28.68%	-16.99%
Alberta Alliance	Blaine Currie	307	2.34%	–
Green	Peter Johnston	271	2.07%	–
Social Credit	Walter Schachenhofer	113	0.86%	–
Total		13,106	–	–
Rejected, spoiled and declined		81	37	4
Eligible electors / Turnout		23,320	56.57%	-0.14%
Liberal gain from Progressive Conservative		Swing		1.33%
Source(s) Source: "00 - Edmonton-Glenora, 2004 Alberta general election". officialresults.elections.ab.ca. Elections Alberta.

=== 2008 ===
2008 Alberta general election
Party	Candidate	Votes	%	±%
Progressive Conservative	Heather Klimchuk	4,604	39.90%	11.22%
Liberal	Bruce Miller	4,508	39.07%	3.94%
New Democratic	Arlene Chapman	1,743	15.11%	-15.81%
Green	Peter Johnston	408	3.54%	1.47%
Wildrose Alliance	Elden Van Hauwaert	275	2.38%	–
Total		11,538	–	–
Rejected, spoiled and declined		36	20	2
Eligible electors / turnout		27,266	42.46%	-14.11%
Progressive Conservative gain from Liberal		Swing		-1.69%
Source(s) Source: "31 - Edmonton-Glenora, 2008 Alberta general election". officialresults.elections.ab.ca. Elections Alberta. The Report on the March 3, 2008 Provincial General Election of the Twenty-seventh Legislative Assembly. Elections Alberta. July 28, 2008. pp. 294–297.

=== 2012 ===
2012 Alberta general election
Party	Candidate	Votes	%	±%
Progressive Conservative	Heather Klimchuk	6,183	38.24%	-1.66%
New Democratic	Ray Martin	4,143	25.62%	10.52%
Wildrose Alliance	Don Koziak	2,732	16.90%	14.51%
Liberal	Bruce Miller	1,670	10.33%	-28.74%
Alberta Party	Sue Huff	1,441	8.91%	–
Total		16,169	–	–
Rejected, spoiled and declined		119	55	6
Eligible electors / turnout		29,262	55.68%	13.23%
Progressive Conservative hold		Swing		5.89%
Source(s) Source: "34 - Edmonton-Glenora, 2012 Alberta general election". officialresults.elections.ab.ca. Elections Alberta.

=== 2015 ===
2015 Alberta general election
Party	Candidate	Votes	%	±%
New Democratic	Sarah Hoffman	12,473	68.45%	42.82%
Progressive Conservative	Heather Klimchuk	3,145	17.26%	-20.98%
Wildrose	Don Koziak	1,394	7.65%	-9.25%
Liberal	Karen Sevcik	553	3.03%	-7.29%
Alberta Party	Chris Vilcsak	463	2.54%	-6.37%
Green	David J. Parker	195	1.07%	–
Total		18,223	–	–
Rejected, spoiled and declined		72	46	14
Eligible electors / turnout		34,388	53.24%	-2.44%
New Democratic gain from Progressive Conservative		Swing		19.29%
Source(s) Source: "34 - Edmonton-Glenora, 2015 Alberta general election". officialresults.elections.ab.ca. Elections Alberta.

=== 2019 ===
2019 Alberta general election
Party	Candidate	Votes	%	±%
New Democratic	Sarah Hoffman	11,573	58.67%	-9.78%
United Conservative	Marjorie Newman	5,871	29.76%	4.85%
Alberta Party	Glen Tickner	1,985	10.06%	7.52%
Alberta Independence	Clint Kelley	298	1.51%	–
Total		19,727	–	–
Rejected, spoiled and declined		84	48	10
Eligible electors / turnout		32,349	61.27%	8.03%
New Democratic hold		Swing		-11.14%
Source(s) Source: "32 - Edmonton-Glenora, 2019 Alberta general election". officialresults.elections.ab.ca. Elections Alberta. Alberta. Chief Electoral Officer (2019). 2019 General Election. A Report of the Chief Electoral Officer. Volume II (PDF) (Report). Vol. 2. Edmonton, Alta.: Elections Alberta. pp. 124–127. ISBN 978-1-988620-12-1.

=== 2023 ===
2023 Alberta general election
Party	Candidate	Votes	%	±%
New Democratic	Sarah Hoffman	12,443	69.20	+10.54
United Conservative	Melissa Crane	5,056	28.12	-1.64
Green	Julian Schulz	332	1.85	–
Solidarity Movement	David John Bohonos	150	0.83	–
Total		17,981	99.14	–
Rejected and declined		156	0.86	
Turnout		18,137	56.28	
Eligible voters		32,227		
New Democratic hold		Swing		+6.09
Source(s) Source: Elections Alberta

== Senate nominee election results ==
=== 2004 ===
2004 Senate nominee election results: Edmonton-Glenora				Turnout 57.78%	
Affiliation	Candidate	Votes	%	Party	Personal
Progressive Conservative	Betty Unger	4,770	17.13%	50.29%	2
Independent	Link Byfield	4,010	14.40%	42.28%	4
Progressive Conservative	Bert Brown	3,035	10.90%	32.00%	1
Independent	Tom Sindlinger	2,875	10.32%	30.31%	9
Progressive Conservative	Cliff Breitkreuz	2,713	9.74%	28.60%	3
Alberta Alliance	Michael Roth	2,447	8.79%	25.80%	7
Alberta Alliance	Gary Horan	2,110	7.58%	22.25%	10
Alberta Alliance	Vance Gough	2,080	7.47%	21.93%	8
Progressive Conservative	David Usherwood	1,979	7.11%	20.87%	6
Progressive Conservative	Jim Silye	1,831	6.56%	19.30%	5
Total votes		27,850	100%		
Total ballots		9,485	2.94 votes per ballot		
Rejected, spoiled and declined		3,989			

Voters had the option of selecting four candidates on the ballot

== Student vote results ==
=== 2004 ===
Participating schools
Archbishop Macdonald School
Westminster School

On November 19, 2004, a student vote was conducted at participating Alberta schools to parallel the 2004 Alberta general election results. The vote was designed to educate students and simulate the electoral process for persons who have not yet reached the legal majority. The vote was conducted in 80 of the 83 provincial electoral districts with students voting for actual election candidates. Schools with a large student body that reside in another electoral district had the option to vote for candidates outside of the electoral district then where they were physically located.

2004 Alberta student vote results
Affiliation	Candidate	Votes	%
NDP	Larry Booi	316	30.98%
Liberal	Bruce Miller	266	26.08%
Progressive Conservative	Drew Hutton	250	24.51%
Green	Peter Johnston	137	13.43%
Alberta Alliance	Blaine Currie	30	2.94%
Social Credit	Walter Schachenhofer	21	2.06%
Total		1,020	100%
Rejected, spoiled and declined		12	

== See also ==
- List of Alberta provincial electoral districts
- Canadian provincial electoral districts
