= John Hudson (theatre director) =

Canadian theatre director, producer and politician (born 1962)

John Hudson (born January 25, 1962) is a Canadian theatre producer and director, and also a politician living in Edmonton, Alberta. He ran to represent the constituency of Edmonton-McClung for the Alberta Party in the 2012 Alberta general election and the 2015 Alberta general election.

== Early life and education ==
Hudson was born in Campbellton, New Brunswick to Mary Hudson (Urquhart) and Dr. Aubrey Hudson. The family moved from Canada’s east coast in 1965 when John was three years old and settled in Calgary, Alberta. John grew up with his parents, grandmother and three sisters. His mother was a stockbroker, and his father was a general pathologist who taught at the University of Calgary and was on staff at the Grace and General Hospitals.

Hudson attended Western Canada High School in Calgary, graduating in 1979. His football team won the City Championship in 1976. He also played rugby and joined the wrestling team. He studied at Augustana University in Camrose in 1980. He won a gold medal in 1984 at The Alberta College Athletic Conference wrestling championships. He was voted student union President in 1981/82, and performed in many university theatre productions. Hudson transferred to The University of Alberta in 1982 where he received a B. A. degree in English and Drama by 1984. In 1985 he was accepted into the acting program at The University of Alberta, graduating in 1988 with a Bachelor of Fine Arts (with distinction).

== Professional life ==
After graduation Hudson and classmate Shaun Johnston founded Shadow Theatre in Edmonton in 1989. The theatre company produces contemporary theatre from Canada and around the world, often with Hudson as director. The company produces a four-show season, and has 600 subscribers. Hudson and the Shadow Theatre productions have been nominated for over 90 Elizabeth Sterling Haynes Theatre Awards in Edmonton, winning in many categories.

In 1992 Hudson opened. The Videodrome, a niche-market video store. The store was voted "Edmonton’s Best Video Store" nine times in fifteen years. It closed in 2012.

In 1996 Hudson was a member of the founding group of artists who formed The Varscona Theatre Alliance, an arts consortium which manages The Varscona Theatre. He was the first President of the board and was Executive Director until 2019. He was the driving force behind the recent refurbishment of the building which was completed in 2016. The Varscona hosts 300 performances each year, with a total attendance of about 25,000 people.

Hudson has been on the board of the Old Strathcona Business Association, was the President of the Edmonton Arts Council 2011/12. He became a member of The Alberta Party in 2010, and in 2012 ran for election to the Alberta Provincial Parliament, representing the Alberta Party, but did not win.

Mr. Hudson has over 100 directing credits to his name including the world premieres of new plays and Canadian premieres of outstanding contemporary works. He is also an actor and has been in over 30 productions. In 2016 Mr. Hudson was inducted into the City of Edmonton's Cultural Hall of Fame.

== Personal life ==
Mr. Hudson lives in west Edmonton, with his wife Sandy, a speech language pathologist, and their two daughters Charlotte and Bella.
