= Mo Elsalhy =

Canadian politician

MLA for Edmonton-McClung
- In office 22 November 2004 – 3 March 2008
- Preceded by: Mark Norris
- Succeeded by: David Xiao

Personal details
- Born: 20 March 1971 (age 55) Egypt
- Party: Alberta Party
- Other political affiliations: Liberal (former)
- Children: 3
- Occupation: Pharmacist

Mo Elsalhy (born 20 March 1971) is a politician, pharmacist and businessman from Alberta, Canada. He received his Bachelor of Science in Pharmacy from the University of Alberta in 1994.

== Political career ==
Elsalhy contested the nomination for Edmonton McClung against Maurice Tougas in 2004, and started campaigning three months before the nomination day. He was elected as a Member of the Legislative Assembly of Alberta representing Edmonton McClung in the 2004 general election for the Alberta Liberal Party. Despite being heavily outspent, he defeated Mark Norris, the only cabinet minister to lose a seat in this election. He was then assigned the role of Critic for the Government Services and Innovation and Science portfolios by Opposition Leader Kevin Taft. He was also made Deputy House Leader and was chosen Shadow Minister of Justice and Attorney General and Shadow Solicitor General and Minister of Public Security. He also chaired the Democratic Renewal Committee for the Official Opposition and was appointed Deputy Chair of the all-party Standing Policy Field Committee for Government Services.

He was defeated in the 2008 election by Progressive Conservative David Xiao.

On 25 July 2008, Elsalhy declared his intention to seek the leadership of the Alberta Liberal Party. He received 11% of the vote which was conducted through a mail-in process. David Swann won that contest and was declared Leader on 13 December 2008. In March 2009, Elsalhy was asked by Swann to lead a seven-member renewal team. The work of his 'Renewal Committee' concluded in July 2009.

On 23 October 2010, Elsalhy was nominated to stand for election again. He was acclaimed as the Alberta Liberal candidate to run in Edmonton-McClung in the 2011/12 provincial election.

In the summer of 2018, he announced his intention to seek a nomination from the Alberta Party for the 2019 election, held in April 2019, running in the constituency of Edmonton-South West where he captured 11.6% of the vote.

== Personal life ==
Elsalhy is married with three children. His pastimes include soccer and swimming.

== Electoral record ==
=== 2019 general election ===
2019 Alberta general election: Edmonton-South West
Party	Candidate	Votes	%	±%
United Conservative	Kaycee Madu	10,254	44.99	+5.96
New Democratic	John Archer	9,539	41.85	-11.97
Alberta Party	Mo Elsalhy	2,668	11.70	+9.04
Alberta Advantage	Marilyn Burns	208	0.91	–
Green	Rigel Vincent	125	0.55	–
Total		22,794	99.29	–
Rejected, spoiled and declined		162	0.71	
Turnout		22,956	70.15	
Eligible voters		32,726		
United Conservative notional gain from New Democratic		Swing		+8.97
Source(s) Source: "43 - Edmonton-South West, 2019 Alberta general election". officialresults.elections.ab.ca. Elections Alberta. Alberta. Chief Electoral Officer (2019). 2019 General Election. A Report of the Chief Electoral Officer. Volume II (PDF) (Report). Vol. 2. Edmonton, Alta.: Elections Alberta. pp. 168–170. ISBN 978-1-988620-12-1.

=== 2012 general election ===
2012 Alberta general election: Edmonton-McClung
Party	Candidate	Votes	%	±%
Progressive Conservative	David Xiao	7,179	46.65%	-2.29%
Liberal	Mo Elsalhy	3,800	24.69%	-15.88%
Wildrose	Peter Janisz	2,756	17.91%	+16.05%
New Democratic	Lorne Dach	1,134	7.37%	+1.07%
Alberta Party	John Hudson	418	2.72%	
Evergreen	Nathan Forsyth	102	0.66%	-1.67%
Total		15,389		
Progressive Conservative hold		Swing		-6.80%

=== 2008 general election ===
2008 Alberta general election results		Turnout 36.74%		Swing	
Affiliation	Candidate	Votes	%	Party	Personal
Progressive Conservative	David Xiao	7,173	48.94%	8.09%	
Liberal	Mo Elsalhy	5,947	40.57%	-4.31%	
New Democratic	Bridget Stirling	924	6.30%	-4.10%	
Green	Bryan Wyrostok	342	2.33%	*	
Wildrose Alliance	Kristine Jassman	272	1.86%	-1.21%	
Total		14,658			
Rejected, spoiled and declined		46			
Eligible electors / Turnout		34,330	%		
Progressive Conservative gain from Liberal		Swing		+6.20%	

=== 2004 general election ===
2004 Alberta general election results		Turnout 51.95%		Swing	
Affiliation	Candidate	Votes	%	Party	Personal
Liberal	Mo Elsalhy	5,859	44.88%	2.08%	
Progressive Conservative	Mark Norris	5,333	40.85%	-9.58%	
New Democratic	Lorne Dach	1,358	10.40%	4.59%	
Alberta Alliance	Reuben Bauer	401	3.07%		
Social Credit	Patrick Conlin	105	0.80%		
Total		13,056			
Rejected, spoiled and declined		71			
Eligible electors / Turnout		25,269	%		
Liberal gain from Progressive Conservative		Swing		+5.83%	

Preceded by Mark Norris	MLA Edmonton McClung; 2004–2008	Succeeded by David Xiao
