= CEDA International =

- Formation: 2013
- Type: NGO
- Legal status: Organization
- Purpose: To Empower and Educate Women and Youth (Girls & Boys) in East Africa
- Headquarters: Kampala, Uganda
- Location: Kampala, Uganda
- Region served: Uganda, Rwanda, Tanzania and Kenya
- Official language: English
- Website: Official website

CEDA International aka Century Entrepreneurship Development Agency is a Non-governmental organization based in Kampala, Uganda founded by Rehmah Kasule. CEDA International Educates, Promote Leadership, Mentor and help with Entrepreneurship for women and youth (girls & boys) all over East Africa.

== Partners ==
CEDA International partners Uganda Telecom, Vital Voices Global Partnership, African Women's Development Fund, MacArthur Foundation, UNDEF, and UN-HABITAT.

== Projects ==
CEDA International Global Mentoring Walk

YEP (Youth Engaged Program)
