= Mark Norris (technology writer) =

Mark Norris is a British consultant in the field of software engineering and telecommunications, noted as for his work writing on technology-related subjects.

He gained a doctorate from the University of Glasgow in 1979 and has since worked in Australia, Europe, the Middle East and Japan in the telecommunications industry (working for some years for BT Group) and in academia (holding a position of visiting professor at the University of Ulster).

Norris is a Fellow of the Institution of Engineering and Technology (formerly known as the Institution of Electrical Engineers).

== Bibliography ==
- Norris, Mark; Rigby, Peter, Software Engineering Explained, John Wiley & Sons Ltd, Chichester, 1992. ISBN
- Norris, Rigby, Payne, The Healthy Software Project: A Guide to Successful Development and Management, John Wiley & Sons Ltd, Chichester, 1993, ISBN
- Norris, Mark, Survival in the Software Jungle, Artech House, 1995. ISBN
- Norris, Mark; Winton, Neil, Energize the Network: Distributed Computing Explained, Addison-Wesley, 1997. ISBN
- Norris, Mark; Frost, Andrew, Exploiting the Internet: Understanding and Exploiting an Investment in the Internet, John Wiley & Sons Ltd, Chichester, 1997. ISBN
- West, Steve; Norris, Mark, Media Engineering: A Guide to Developing Information Products, John Wiley & Sons Ltd, Chichester, 1997, ISBN
- Atkins, John; Norris, M, Total Area Networking, 2nd Edition, John Wiley & Sons Ltd, Chichester, 1999. ISBN
- Norris, Mark; Pretty, Steve, Designing the Total Area Network: Intranets, VPN's and Enterprise Networks Explained, John Wiley & Sons Ltd, Chichester, 1999, ISBN
- Bustard, Dave; Kawalek, Peter; Norris, Mark (Editors), Systems Modeling for Business Process Improvement, Artech House, 2000. ISBN
- Norris, M, Communications Technology Explained, John Wiley & Sons Ltd, Chichester, 2000. ISBN
- Norris, Mark; West, Steve, eBusiness essentials: technology and network requirements for mobile and online markets, 2nd Edition, John Wiley & Sons Ltd, Chichester, 2001. ISBN
- Norris, Mark, Mobile IP Technology for M-Business, Artech House, 2001.ISBN
- Norris, Mark, Gigabit Ethernet Technology and Applications, Artech House, 2002. ISBN
