= Nancy MacBeth =

Canadian politician (born 1948)

The Honourable Nancy MacBeth ECA

Leader of the Opposition in Alberta
- In office July 7, 1998 – March 11, 2001
- Preceded by: Howard Sapers
- Succeeded by: Ken Nicol

Leader of the Alberta Liberal Party
- In office April 18, 1998 – March 15, 2001
- Preceded by: Grant Mitchell
- Succeeded by: Ken Nicol
Alberta Executive Council
Minister of Health
In office September 8, 1988 – December 14, 1992
Premier	Don Getty
Preceded by	Marvin Moore (Hospitals and Medical Care)
Succeeded by	Shirley McClellan
Minister of Education
In office May 26, 1986 – September 8, 1988
Premier	Don Getty
Preceded by	Neil Webber
Succeeded by	Jim Dinning
Parliamentary constituencies
Member of the Legislative Assembly of Alberta for Edmonton
In office June 17, 1998 – March 12, 2001
Preceded by	Grant Mitchell
Succeeded by	Mark Norris
Constituency	Edmonton-McClung
In office May 8, 1986 – June 15, 1993
Preceded by	Lou Hyndman
Succeeded by	Howard Sapers
Constituency	Edmonton-Glenora

Personal details
- Born: Nancy Elliott; December 29, 1948 (age 77) Edmonton, Alberta, Canada
- Party: Liberal (1998–present)
- Other political affiliations: Progressive Conservative (1982–1993)
- Spouse(s): Stefan Betkowski; Hilliard MacBeth
- Education: University of Alberta; Université Laval

Nancy MacBeth ECA (née Elliott; born December 29, 1948) is a Canadian politician who was the leader of the Alberta Liberal Party and Leader of the Opposition from 1998 to 2001. She was the first female opposition leader in the province's history. She sat as a Progressive Conservative MLA from 1986 to 1993.

== Early life ==
Born in Edmonton, Alberta, MacBeth received a Bachelor of Arts at the University of Alberta, in French and Russian; studying Université Laval, studying French Canadian literature. She subsequently worked as an executive assistant for several Alberta cabinet ministers.

== Early political career ==
MacBeth, then known as Nancy Betkowski, first entered electoral politics as an Alberta Progressive Conservative Party Member of the Legislative Assembly (MLA) for the riding of Edmonton-Glenora from 1986 to 1993 in the government of Don Getty. She was Minister of Education from 1986 to 1988, and was then appointed Minister of Health, serving in that position until 1992.

She then ran as a candidate in the party's 1992 leadership convention against Ralph Klein. Regarded by the membership as a Red Tory, Betkowski became the preferred candidate of the party establishment. However, Klein's populist appeal won him the leadership, and Betkowski did not stand as a candidate in the 1993 election.

== Liberal leader ==
She subsequently married portfolio manager and financial writer Hilliard MacBeth.

She then returned to politics in 1998, running for the leadership of the Alberta Liberals after the resignation of Grant Mitchell. Elected to be the MLA for Edmonton-McClung, MacBeth tried to capitalize on discontent with Klein's government in some Alberta communities by reaching out to disaffected Red Tories, but proved unable to connect with voters.

In the 2001 provincial election, the Liberals won only seven seats, less than half as many as they had held before the election. Among the losses was MacBeth's own seat of Edmonton-McClung. The election left the party a million dollar debt that took about 10 years to pay off.

She left politics again, and was succeeded by Ken Nicol as party leader.
