= Alberta Advantage =

Political phrase about Alberta, Canada

The Alberta Advantage is a term referencing the provincial ethos of the province of Alberta and the features that differentiate Alberta from other Canadian provinces and territories. Jack Mintz, the director of the University of Calgary's School of Public Policy defined the Alberta Advantage as "a great life with rising incomes and reasonable public services..."

== History ==
The historical Alberta Tax Advantage was based on its "three main pillars"—lower "personal income taxes, corporate income taxes, and sales taxes." According to the Fraser Institute, in "2014, Alberta had the lowest top combined federal-provincial/state tax rate out of 60 Canadian provinces and American states."

A January 5, 2017 Fraser Institute article entitled "The End of the Alberta Tax Advantage", said that the 2015 tax policy changes were introduced in Alberta placed the province in the "middle of the pack". Before 2015, at 10%, "Alberta had the lowest corporate tax rate in Canada." The 2015 corporate tax increase to 12% meant that both British Columbia and Ontario had a 0.5% lower corporate tax rate than Alberta, and taxes in Saskatchewan, Manitoba, and Quebec that were almost identical to Alberta's. By 2017, after the 2015 tax policy changes, "Alberta's top personal income tax rate was the 46th lowest." The province's top rate was in the "highest third of North American jurisdictions." The report said that, "Comparing the marginal personal income tax rate at four different income levels reveals that Alberta no longer [had] a distinct tax advantage in any of those levels examined." While Alberta was the only Canadian province to not have a provincial sales tax, compared to "American energy jurisdictions" this does not give Alberta an advantage as "there are several states with neither a federal nor a state-level sales tax."

Alberta has lowered its higher corporate tax rate to 8%, the "lowest taxes overall of any province or territory" in Canada (by 3.5%), after the passing of Bill 3, Job Creation Tax cut passed by the UCP majority Government on June 28, 2019. This reduction was originally scheduled to occur over 3 years, but was then accelerated as part of the COVID response, "Alberta's Recovery Plan", in 2020.
