= Mark Norris (Canadian politician) =

Canadian politician (born 1962)

Mark Norris ECA (born 1962) is an Alberta politician, former MLA and candidate for the leadership of the Progressive Conservatives.

Norris was born and raised in Edmonton, Alberta and earned his Bachelor of Arts in political science from St. Francis Xavier University in Nova Scotia.

He returned to Edmonton following his university years and purchased from his father Paul J. Norris, in 1990, an advertising and sign manufacturing company.

Norris won a seat in the Alberta legislature in 2001 provincial election as the MLA for Edmonton McClung, becoming a celebrated figure within the party for doing so because he had defeated former Tory leadership candidate-turned-Liberal leader Nancy MacBeth. Norris served as the Minister of Economic Development in the Albertan Cabinet under Premier Ralph Klein, but became the only cabinet minister to lose his seat in the 2004 provincial election.

Norris does not rule Alberta separatism out as an option. He told the Calgary Sun in March 2006 that under his leadership, if a future federal government persisted in bringing in policies harmful to Alberta such as a carbon tax, "(Alberta is) going to take steps to secede."

On May 30, 2006, Norris became an official candidate in the race to replace Ralph Klein as Premier of Alberta. On the first ballot, he finished sixth of eight candidates, capturing 6.9% of the vote, and was required to withdraw from the race. He subsequently endorsed eventual winner Ed Stelmach.

== See also ==
- Wescorp Energy

Preceded by Nancy MacBeth	MLA Edmonton McClung; 2001–2004	Succeeded by Mo Elsalhy
