= Sohi =

Sohi may refer to:

== People ==
- Amarjeet Sohi (born 1964), Canadian politician
- Dolly Sohi (1975–2024), Indian television actress
- Gurpreet Sohi (born 1984), Canadian water polo player
- Litta Soheila Sohi (born 1966), Iranian dressage rider
- Sardar Sohi (born 1949), Punjabi Indian actor
- Naser Al-Sohi (1974–2004), Kuwaiti footballer

== Other uses ==
- Sohi language, or Soi, a central Iranian language
- Sōhi (蒼氷), a character from the X manga series
- Sortis Capital, a private equity firm also known as SoHi Brands
