= Roman Candle (Portland, Oregon) =

Defunct bakery and pizzeria in Portland, Oregon, U.S.

Roman Candle Baking Co.
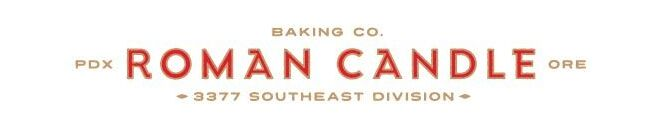

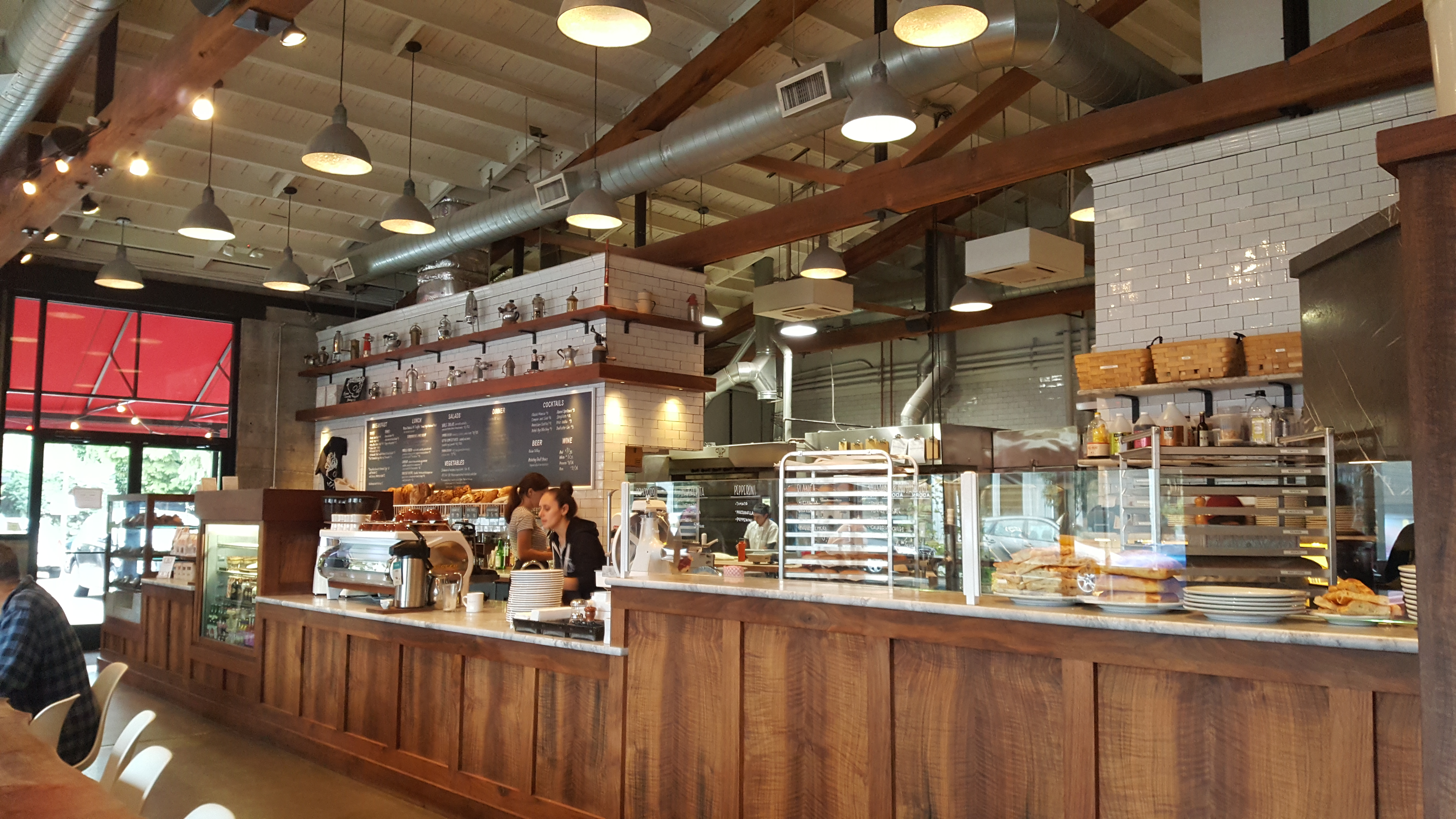
- The bakery's interior, 2016
- Interactive map of Roman Candle Baking Co.

Restaurant information
- Established: June 2013
- Closed: April 2018
- Owner: Duane Sorenson
- Chef: Joshua McFadden; Chris Robertson
- Pastry chef: Dan Griffin
- Food type: Italian
- Location: 3377 Southeast Division Street, Portland, Multnomah, Oregon, 97202, United States
- Coordinates: 45.504861°N 122.629868°W

Roman Candle Baking Co., or simply Roman Candle, was a bakery and pizzeria–restaurant in the Richmond neighborhood of Portland, Oregon, United States. Duane Sorenson opened Roman Candle in 2013, with a menu offering wood-fired pizza and other Italian cuisine, including sandwiches, breads, green salads, pastries, and baked potatoes. Dan Griffin and Joshua McFadden served as the baker and chef, respectively. The bakery started supplying select menu items to Sorenson's Stumptown Coffee Roasters locations in late 2015. Roman Candle received a generally positive reception, with the pizzas and kouign-amann receiving the most praise. The restaurant closed in April 2018 for renovations, ahead of a rebrand as a gluten-free and vegan cafe called Holiday, which Sorenson launched one month later.

== Description ==
Roman Candle Baking Co. was a bakery and pizzeria–restaurant on Division Street in southeast Portland's Richmond neighborhood. The interior featured "custom tiles and marble ... offset by communal tables hewn from Oregon walnut wood", according to Travel + Leisure, as well as "thick-wooded" cases displaying pastries and pizza, according to Willamette Week's Shannon Gormley. Thrillist described the interior as "Euro-chic" and "stylish". In 2014, The Oregonian's Michael Russell said the crowd was trendy, describing the clientele as "young mothers, runners in performance tights and freelancers in knit caps and turquoise rings tapping away on open laptops." He said of the heavily-tiled interior: "With a quarry's worth of tile on the walls and bathrooms fit for a Roman senator, the room is a bit of unadulterated glossy magazine catnip."

=== Menu ===
The Italian menu offered Roman-style, square-shaped, wood-fired pizza, as well as sandwiches. Seven types of pizza were available, including margherita-style and others with toppings such as mushroom, pepperoni, potato, sausage, and herbs. Thrillist said the pizzas "straddle the line between flatbread and focaccia – neither too crunchy nor too fluffy". Sandwiches included The Bodega (bacon and egg salad), The Lil Guy (scallion cream cheese on an everything bun), and The Frankie (mozzarella, pesto and Mama Lil's-brand peppers on tomato bread). The Sloppy Giuseppe was "a spin on the sloppy joe with beef and pork ragu stuffed into a triangle of focaccia-esque bread", according to Russell.

Breads, green salads, and pastries were also available. Salad options included Tuscan Cavalry, from the neighboring restaurant Ava Gene's, as well as the Fruit Loop with Asian pears, hazelnuts, and pecorino. Pastries included croissants, danishes, breakfast quiches, scones, shortbreads, and tarts; the dessert menu included cookies and kouign-amann. The kouign-amann, once described as "Portland's most talked about pastry", had debuted at Matthew Zack's Alder Pastry and Dessert. The drink menu featured coffee made by owner Duane Sorenson's Stumptown Coffee Roasters, using a custom-built espresso machine by La Marzocco. The bakery also offered $2 Rainier draft beers, two cocktails on draft, and 16 varieties of wine by the glass or bottle.

In 2014, the lunch menu was expanded with additional vegetable options, as well as four pizza varieties, including pomodoro, pepperoni, and margherita. As of 2016, the menu also had two varieties of arancini, prosciutto, and burrata. The "loaded" baked potato had Roman-style flatbread with mashed Yukon Gold potato, bacon, scallions, sour cream, provolone piccante, and Picklopolis-brand hot sauce.

== History ==
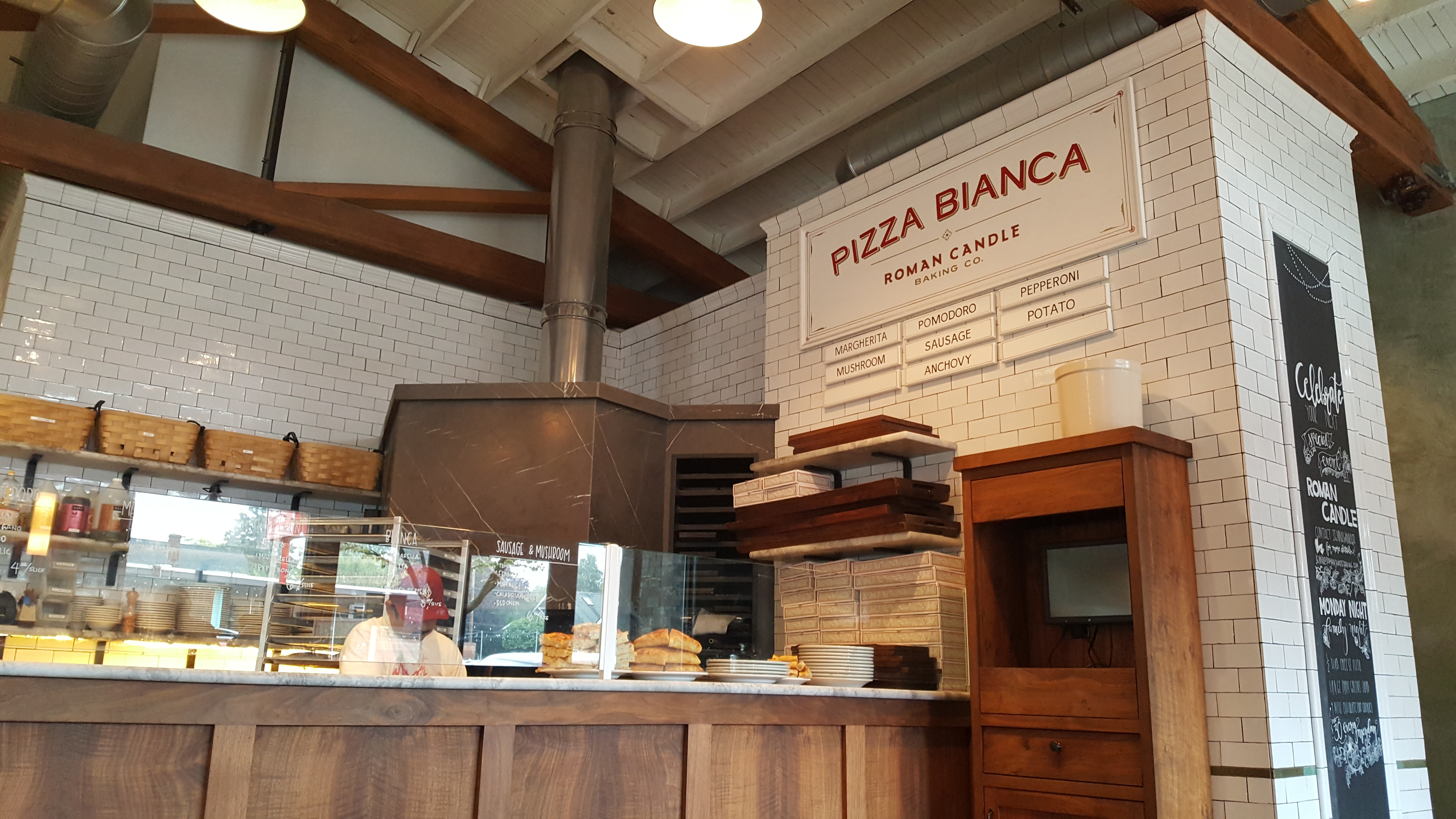
The pizzeria's wood-fired oven, 2016

Following a delay, Sorenson opened Roman Candle in July 2013, in the space previously used for roasting by Stumptown. Upon opening, Roman Candle served breakfast and lunch; the pizza operation took several additional weeks to be fully implemented. Dan Griffin and Joshua McFadden served as the baker and chef, respectively. The pizza-dominated evening menu was launched in early October 2013. Pizza became available on the lunch menu in March 2014.

In May 2015, Roman Candle hosted a pop-up featuring Joe Tarasco, the chef de cuisine of Danny Meyer, and Union Square Hospitality Group's Manhattan restaurant Marta, which is also known for its Roman-style, wood-fired pizzas. The collaborative event was billed as an "Italian evening of pizza, vegetables, Roman-inspired street food and house-made gelato". In November, Stumptown cafes in Portland began serving the Tuscan Cavalry salad and three sandwiches (The Bodega, The Lil Guy, and The Frankie) made by Roman Candle. As of 2016, Chris Robertson served as chef.

On April 20 (an unofficial holiday in cannabis culture), 2016, Roman Candle gave away free slices of margherita pizza for 42 minutes, starting at 4:20 p.m. The pizzeria also sold Loaded Baked Potato pizza slices for $2 all week long, as part of the Portland Mercury's Pizza Week.

=== Closure ===
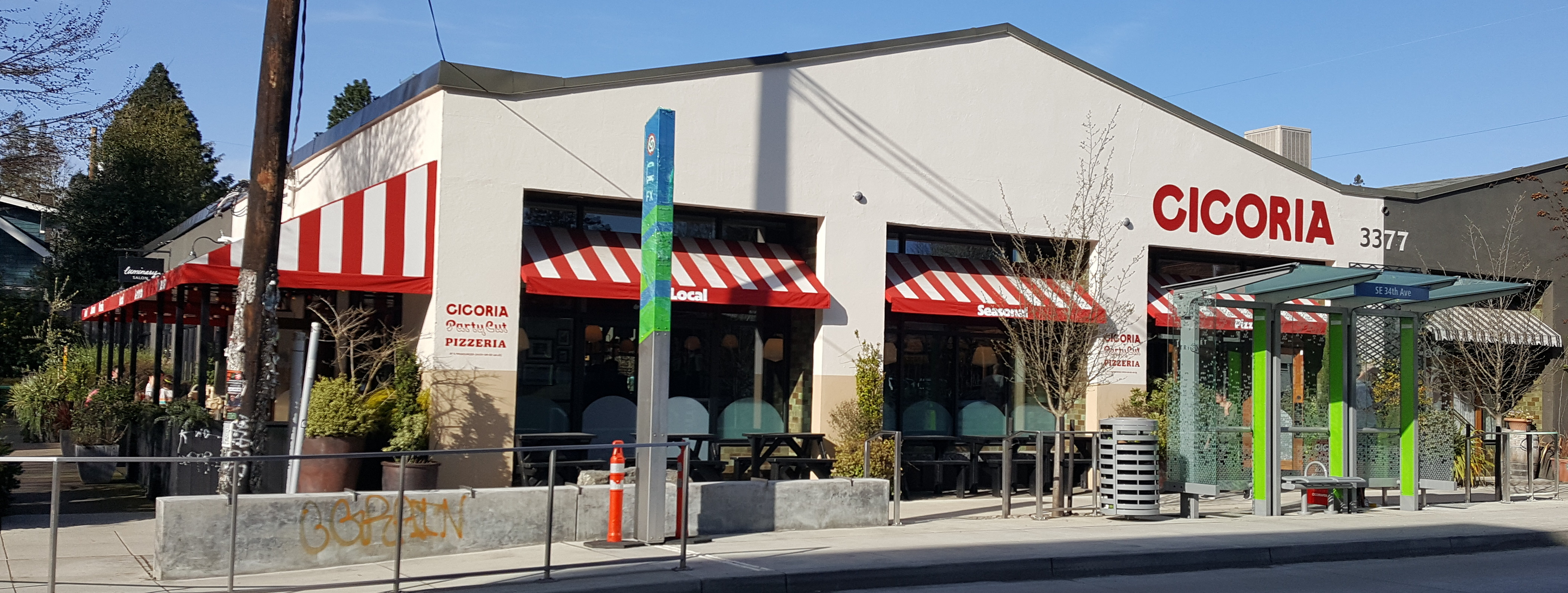
Exterior of the pizzeria Cicoria (pictured in 2022), which later occupied the space that housed Roman Candle

In April 2018, Roman Candle closed for renovations and announced upcoming menu changes. The establishment reopened in May as a "health-conscious" cafe called Holiday, taking patrons by surprise. Eater Portland's Brooke Jackson-Glidden described Holiday as a "reggae-pumping, jungle-plant-adorned, gluten-free and vegetarian cafe", offering juices, plant-based entrees, and "foraged mushroom toasts by an in-house forager", reflecting Sorenson's healthier lifestyle and sobriety. Sorensen had been planning the rebrand for approximately six months, and continued working behind Holiday's coffee counter, serving Stumptown coffee. He described Holiday's vegan menu as "Plantbased. Dairy free. Organic. Cold press[ed] juice. Healthier, Cleaner."

The revamped menu was tested in May 2016, ahead of Holiday's formal launch. As of May, the menu had bowls with kelp noodles and cauliflower, fancy toasts, and cold-pressed juices. Some customers were reportedly upset by the rollout, frustrated by limited public warning of the changes and the lack of pizza on the menu. Jackson-Glidden included the rebrand in her list of "Portland's Biggest Dining Surprises of 2018". In 2019, Sorenson closed Holiday, and planned to reopen downtown. Holiday was replaced by the pizzeria Cicoria.

== Reception ==
Travel + Leisure said, "You won't have any trouble feeling at home with a cup of Stumptown cold brew and a kouign-amann pastry." Condé Nast Traveler also recommended the "glistening" kouign-amann. Following the launch of the pizza menu in October 2013, Eater's Amy McKeever included Roman Candle in her list of the "24 hottest pizzerias across the US right now". Thrillist has described the pizzas as "tasty" with a "crust to filling ratio on lock".

Michael Russell of The Oregonian gave Roman Candle a 'B' rating and preferred the "morning offerings" over the pizza, which he said had "unimpeachable" toppings but "unsatisfying" bread. He advised, "Walk directly to the counter and order the kouign amann, the sinfully good layered pastry", then consider the "good-to-very-good rustic breads". Russell called the evening salads "less inspiring" but the arancini, prosciutto, and burrata "excellent". He opined, "A stroll down Division, a perfect macchiato, a quick kouign amann, eaten alone or with a friend: I can think of little better." In 2017, he ranked Roman Candle twelfth in his list of "Portland's 17 best sandwich shops". Portland Mercury's Courtney Ferguson called the Loaded Baked Potato a "crew favorite" and wrote:

Like a pizza mashup of your favorite cozy moments, your mouth will feel like it's sitting by a crackling fireplace in a ski lodge from your youth. Your stomach, meanwhile, will feel so full that you'll have to catch a cab home. For a mere $2 you could very feasibly stretch this rectangle of mashed potato-goodness into two separate meals, like back in the days of collegiate yore when even buying ramen seemed like an insurmountable challenge.

Willamette Week's Martin Cizmar included Roman Candle in his 2014 list of his "favorite pies and wedges sized for one and priced under $8". He described Roman Candle as "bright" and "clean", and credited Sorenson for popularizing fancy toast locally. Cizmar said of the bakery's avocado toast option called the No. 2: "I'm not sure I could make this for cheaper than $7 at home, and I know I couldn't make it better."

== See also ==
- List of bakeries
- List of Italian restaurants
- Pizza in Portland, Oregon
