= 2021 Edmonton municipal election =

Municipal election in Canada

- October 18, 2021

Mayor and 12 councillors to Edmonton City Council
- Turnout: 37.6% (▲6.6 pp)
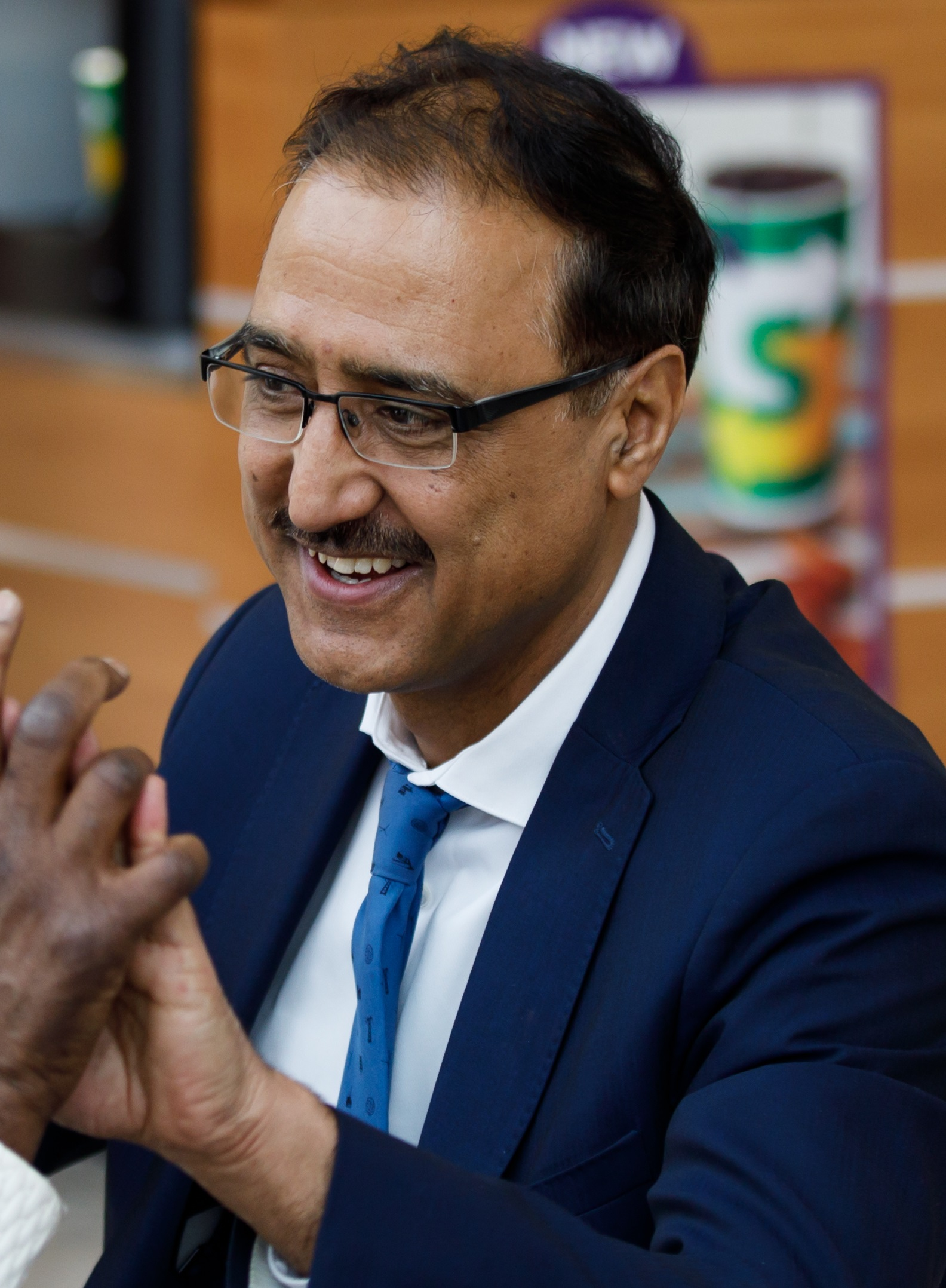

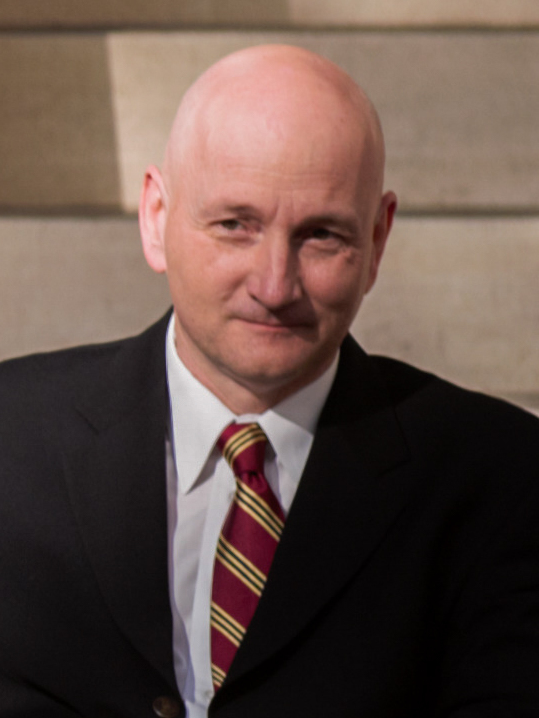

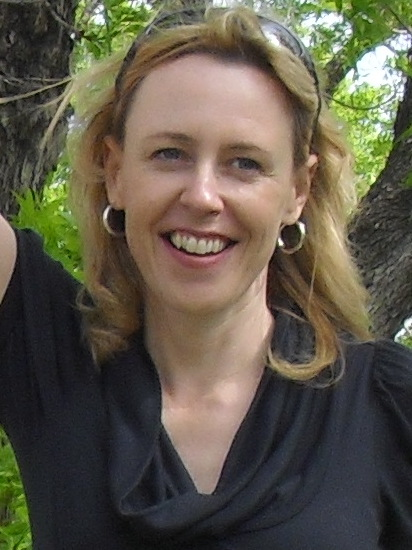

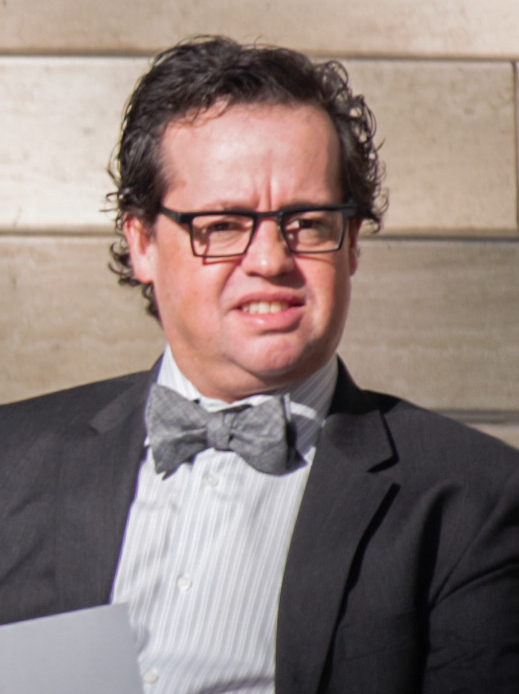
Candidate	Amarjeet Sohi	Mike Nickel
Popular vote	105,683	59,309
Percentage	45.05%	25.28%
Candidate	Kim Krushell	Michael Oshry
Popular vote	40,513	14,500
Percentage	17.27%	6.18%
Mayor before election
Don Iveson
Elected mayor
Amarjeet Sohi

The 2021 Edmonton municipal election was held on October 18, 2021, to elect a mayor and 12 councillors to the Edmonton city council, nine trustees to Edmonton Public Schools, and seven trustees to the Edmonton Catholic Schools. It was held in conjunction with the 2021 Alberta municipal elections.

In conjunction with the municipal elections, residents voted in a provincially mandated Senate nominee election, a referendum on equalization and on whether to adopt permanent daylight saving time.

Incumbent mayor Don Iveson announced in November 2020 that he would not be seeking re-election.

Mayor was elected through first-past-the-post voting in at-large contest. Councillors and school board trustees were elected through first-past-the-post voting in single-member wards.

Successful candidates do not need to have majority support of the voters in their district. The successful mayoral candidate and nine of the 12 successful ward councillors were elected with less than majority of votes in their districts. Over all the 12 wards, of the more than 210,000 votes cast for councillor candidates, 99,000 voters saw their choice elected.

The total number of votes cast for mayor was 236,488.

== Candidates ==
X = incumbent. Candidates as listed have filed the necessary paperwork with the City of Edmonton.

=== Mayor ===
Candidate	Vote	%
Amarjeet Sohi	105,683	45.05
Mike Nickel	59,309	25.28
Kim Krushell	40,513	17.27
Michael Oshry	14,500	6.18
Cheryll Watson	6,803	2.9
Rick Comrie (Note: Dropped out of the race, endorsed Mike Nickel)	1,752	0.75
Diana Steele	1,741	0.74
Abdul Malik Chukwudi (Note: Dropped out of the race, endorsed Mike Nickel)	1,368	0.58
Brian (Breezy) Gregg	1,344	0.57
Vanessa Denman	907	0.39
Augustine Marah	671	0.29

- Abdul Malik Chukwudi – engineer
- Rick Comrie – business owner
- Brian (Breezy) Gregg – retired music artist
- Kim Krushell – former councillor
- Augustine Marah – teacher and community activist
- Mike Nickel – incumbent ward 11 councillor
- Michael Oshry – former councillor
- Amarjeet Sohi – former councillor and MP
- Diana Steele – President of Crestwood Community League
- Cheryll Watson – Former Head of Innovate Edmonton

=== Council ===
The following is a list of candidates that announced their candidacy for the 2021 election. Edmonton's ward map was redrawn for the 2021 election, with each ward being given an Indigenous name.

Each ward elected one councillor through First-past-the-post voting.

The total number of candidates for council seats was larger than in any previous election in Edmonton history, beating the record set in the 1964 Edmonton municipal election.

==== Nakota Isga ====
(Rosenthal, West Jasper Place, Big Lake, Westview Village, Lewis Farms, Glenora)

Candidate	Vote	%
Andrew Knack (X)	12,107	66.15
Dave Olivier	3,288	17.96
Steve Weston	2,908	15.89

- Andrew Knack – incumbent
- Dave Olivier – businessman
- Steve Weston – construction manager

==== Anirniq ====
(Calder, the Pallisades, Griesbach, Athlone, Wellington, Lauderdale, Rosslyn, Kensington, Carlisle, Cumberland, Sherbrooke, Inglewood, Woodcroft, Dovercourt, Prince Charles, Albany)

Candidate	Vote	%
Erin Rutherford	4,689	26.14
Bev Esslinger (X)	4,423	24.66
Tyler Zutz	3,949	22.01
Ali Haymour	3,593	20.03
Mark Davies	1,285	7.16

- Mark Davies – risk management director
- Bev Esslinger – incumbent
- Ali Haymour – finished third in the 2017 Ward 2 race
- Erin Rutherford – public sector manager
- Tyler Zutz – business consultant

==== tastawiyiniwak ====
(Castle Downs, Dickinsfield, Londonderry, Lake District)

Candidate	Vote	%
Karen Principe	6,861	38.90
Jon Dziadyk (X)	5,391	30.57
Ahmed "Knowmadic" Ali	2,689	15.25
Cody Bondarchuk	2,368	13.43
Zain Hafiz	179	1.01
Iannie Gerona	148	0.84

- Ahmed "Knowmadic" Ali – poet
- Cody Bondarchuk – community leader
- Jon Dziadyk – incumbent
- Iannie Gerona – shopkeeper
- Zain Hafiz – business owner
- Karen Principe – finished third in the 2017 Ward 3 race

==== Dene ====
(Casselman-Steele Heights, Clareview, Hermitage, Horse Hill, Pilot Sound)

Candidate	Vote	%
Aaron Paquette (X)	8,240	53.62
Tricia Velthuizen	3,358	21.85
Lana Palmer	2,507	16.31
Andy Andrzej Gudanowski	637	4.14
Gerard Mutabazi Amani	626	4.07

- Gerard Mutabazi Amani – community leader
- Andy Andrzej Gudanowski – finished sixth in the 2017 Ward 7 race
- Aaron Paquette – incumbent
- Lana Palmer – oral surgeon
- Tricia Velthuizen – spokesperson for Service Alberta Minister Nate Glubish, finished fourth in the 2017 Ward 4 race

==== O-day’min ====
(Riverview Area, Edgemont, Stillwater, Uplands, River's Edge, Glastonbury, Granville, Hamptons, Lymnurn, Ormsby Place, Dechene, Downtown, Callingwood North/South, Elmwood, Lynnwood, Patricia Heights, Quesnell, Oleskiew, Thorncliff, Westringe, Cameron, Jamieson Place, Wedgewood, Donsdale, Gariepy, Lessard North)

Candidate	Vote	%
Anne Stevenson	4,026	26.71
Gabrielle Battiste	2,993	19.86
Adrian Bruff	2,706	17.95
Joshua Wolchansky	1,808	11.99
Tony Caterina (X)	1,556	10.32
Gino Akbari	1,216	8.07
Mohammed Migdaddy	307	2.04
Naima Haile	240	1.59
Ibrahim Wado	128	0.85
Adil Pirbhai	93	0.62

- Gino Akbari – entrepreneur
- Gabrielle Battiste – lawyer
- Adrian Bruff – entrepreneur
- Tony Caterina – incumbent
- Naima Haile – curator
- Mohammed Migdaddy – clinical pharmacist
- Adil Pirbhai – finished fourth in the 2017 Ward 6 race
- Anne Stevenson – urban planner
- Ibrahim Wado
- Joshua Wolchansky – civil servant

==== Métis ====
(Abbottsfield, Alberta Avenue, Avonmore, Beacon Heights, Bellevue, Bergman, Beverly Heights, Bonnie Doon, Capilano, Cloverdale, Cromdale, Delton, Eastwood, Elmwood Park, Forest Heights, Fulton Place, Gold Bar, Highlands, Holyrood, Idylwylde, Kenilworth, King Edward Park, Montrose, Newton, Ottewell, Parkdale, Rundle Heights, Strathearn, Terrace Heights, Virginia Park)

Candidate	Vote	%
Ashley Salvador	8,316	34.46
Caroline Matthews	5,357	22.20
Cori Longo	4,367	18.09
James Kosowan	1,790	7.42
Steven Townsend	1,424	5.90
Liz John-West	1,382	5.73
Rob Bernshaw	555	2.30
Brian Kendrick	332	1.38
Salar Melli	190	0.79
Abdulhakim Dalel	157	0.65
Daniel John Kornak	147	0.61
Jim Rickett	118	0.49

- Rob Bernshaw – finished third in the 2013 Ward 3 race
- Abdulhakim Dalel – political activist
- Liz John-West – finished fourth in the 2017 Ward 7 race
- Brian Kendrick – finished third in the 2010 Ward 5 race
- Daniel John Kornak – political activist
- James Kosowan – finished third in the 2017 Ward 8 race
- Cori Longo – postal worker
- Caroline Matthews – entrepreneur
- Salar Melli – entrepreneur
- Jim Rickett – Telus operations manager
- Ashley Salvador – entrepreneur
- Steven Townsend – entrepreneur

==== sipiwiyiniwak ====
(The Grange, Riverview, Cameron Heights, Laurier Heights, Edgemont)

Candidate	Vote	%
Sarah Hamilton (X)	10,227	44.22
Giselle General	5,180	22.40
Derek Hlady	4,380	18.94
Daniel Heikkinen	2,291	9.91
Scott Hayes	1,050	4.54

- Giselle General – public servant
- Sarah Hamilton – incumbent
- Scott Hayes – realtor
- Daniel Heikkinen – entrepreneur
- Derek Hlady – entrepreneur

==== papastew ====
(Belgravia, Strathcona, Ritchie, Grandview, Allendale, Pleasantview, Aspen Gardens, Greenfield, Duggan)

Candidate	Vote	%
Michael Janz	8,614	40.58
Susan Field	4,354	20.51
Kirsten Goa	4,089	19.27
Haruun Ali	1,713	8.07
James Cameron	1,384	6.52
Tarcy Schindelka	630	2.97
Byron Vass	441	2.08

- Haruun Ali – university student
- James Cameron – businessman
- Susan Field – businesswoman
- Kirsten Goa – finished second in the 2017 Ward 8 race
- Michael Janz – former public school trustee of Ward F
- Tarcy Schindelka – businessman
- Byron Vass – environmental sector

==== pihêsiwin ====
(Riverbend, Terwillegar Heights, Windermere, Magrath Heights, Mactaggart)

Candidate	Vote	%
Tim Cartmell (X)	16,252	81.24
Guiscela Perez Arellano	3,754	18.76

- Guiscela Perez Arellano – IT
- Tim Cartmell – incumbent

==== Ipiihkoohkanipiaohtsi ====
(Kaskitayo:Blue Quill, Ermineskin, Keheewin, Twinbrooks; Heritage Valley:Blackburne, Rutherford, Graydon Hill, Chappelle, Allard)

Candidate	Vote	%
Jennifer Rice	5,831	32.40
Rhiannon Hoyle	5,792	32.18
Scott Johnston	2,103	11.68
Glynnis Andrea Lieb	1,760	9.78
Jon Morgan	1,727	9.60
Jason Carter	785	4.36

- Jason Carter – Indigenous artist
- Rhiannon Hoyle – entrepreneur
- Scott Johnston – radio reporter
- Glynnis Andrea Lieb – social psychologist
- Jon Morgan – community leader
- Jennifer Rice – public servant

==== Karhiio ====
(Ellerslie, Knottwood, Lakewood, Mill Woods Town Centre, Millbourne, Millhurst, Woodvale, Summerside, Southeast Edmonton)

Candidate	Vote	%
Keren Tang	7,459	39.72
Tom Shaw	5,682	30.26
Shamair Turner	2,314	12.32
Charan Saggu	1,667	8.88
Sana Kakar	1,341	7.14
Muhammad Herman Gill	315	1.68

- Muhammad Herman Gill – businessman
- Sana Kakar – architect
- Charan Saggu – businessman
- Tom Shaw – project manager
- Keren Tang – finished second in the 2017 Ward 11 race
- Shamair Turner – insurance broker

==== Sspomitapi ====
(Decoteau, The Meadows, Burnewood, Ridgewood, Southwood, Maple Ridge)

Candidate	Vote	%
Jo-Anne Wright	5,860	34.45
Harman Singh Kandola	4,624	27.18
Moe Banga (X)	4,054	23.83
Sanjay Malhotra	810	4.76
Jasbir Singh Gill	802	4.71
Rashpal Sehmby	608	3.57
Mukesh Makwana	252	1.48

- Moe Banga – incumbent
- Jasbir Singh Gill – President of Edmonton Taxi Association
- Harman Singh Kandola – lawyer
- Mukesh Makwana – welder
- Sanjay Malhotra – businessman
- Rashpal Sehmby – postal worker
- Jo-Anne Wright – finished second in the 2013 Ward 12 race

=== Edmonton Public School Board Trustees ===
Nine elected, one per ward through first past the post.

Candidate	Votes	%
Ward A
Perry Chahal	1,959	13.21
Sherri O'Keefe	6,571	44.32
Everline Atieno Oloo	632	4.26
Sheeraz Rahman	1,678	11.32
Belen Samuel	3,987	26.89
Ward B
Dakota Drouillard	1,851	13.36
Esther Ekpe Adewuyi	2,170	15.66
Keltie Marshall	4,384	31.65
Marsha Nelson	5,448	39.33
Ward C
Kassie Burkholder	3,736	21.64
David Dougherty	2,618	15.17
Leticia Gomez	1,981	11.48
Marcia Hole	7,099	41.12
Lisa Shefsky	1,829	10.59
Ward D
Trisha Estabrooks (X)	17,465	74.25
Jen Martin	6,056	25.75
Ward E
Sam Filice	3,813	22.59
Rebecca Graff-McRae	3,673	21.76
Dawn Hancock	4,598	27.24
Judy Kim-Meneen	3,396	20.12
Kim Doyle Thorsen	1,398	8.28
Ward F
Nancy Hunt	5,772	22.81
Julie Kusiek	9,597	37.92
Ken Lister	7,950	31.41
Kimberley McMann	1,989	7.86
Ward G
Guri Dhaliwal	3,445	15.95
Hannah Hamilton	4,981	23.06
Angela MacLaggan	3,330	15.42
Saadiq Sumar	5,432	25.15
Heather D. Swain	3,844	17.79
Inderjeet Kaur Tuli	570	2.64
Ward H
William John Haines	3,754	26.67
Nathan Ip (X)	10,325	73.33
Ward I
Ricardo Casanova	780	6.36
Taranvir Singh Dhanoa	1,445	11.77
Navjot Kaur	1,212	9.88
Emily MacKenzie	2,791	22.74
Corrine Rondeau	976	7.95
Jan Sawyer	3,940	32.11
Simran Villing	1,128	9.19

Ip, the elected trustee for Ward H, was elected MLA in the 2023 provincial election. He resigned as trustee – the school board voted not to hold a by-election but to have trustee Jan Sawyer cover his ward as well as her own.

=== Edmonton Catholic School Board Trustees ===
Candidate	Votes	%
Ward 71
Terrence (Terry) Harris (X)	Acclaimed	
Ward 72
Sandra Palazzo (X)	Acclaimed	
Ward 73
Carla Smiley (X)	Acclaimed	
Ward 74
Debbie Engel (X)	Acclaimed	
Ward 75
Alene Mutala (X)	Acclaimed	
Ward 76
Lisa Turchansky (X)	Acclaimed	
Ward 77
Kara Pelech	2,514	32.72%
Laura Thibert (X)	5,170	67.28%

Carla Smiley resigned from the position in October 2021. As of July 2023, the Catholic School Board was refusing to hold a by-election.

== Mayoral opinion polling ==
Polling firm	Date	Rick Comrie	Kim Krushell	Mike Nickel	Michael Oshry	Amarjeet Sohi	Cheryll Watson	Other	Sample size	Polling method	Lead
Leger	October 11, 2021	–	12%	16%	6%	34%	5%	Undecided 20%, Other 4%	503	online	18%
Spadina Strategies	October 11, 2021	–	14.9%	26.4%	8.9%	32.3%	3.5%	Undecided 14.0%	529	IVR	5.9%
Leger	July 26, 2021	2%	5%	10%	3%	29%	2%	Undecided 43%, Abdul Malik Chukwudi 1%, Diana Steele 1%	458	online	10%
Mainstreet Research	January 18, 2021	–	7.2%	11%	–	–	4.9%	Undecided 62%, Andrew Knack 8.4%, Other 6.4%	1,113	online	2.6%

== See also ==
- 2021 Alberta municipal elections
- 2021 Calgary municipal election
- 2021 Lethbridge municipal election
