= Sortis Capital =

American private equity firm

SoHi Brands
- Founded: 1995; 31 years ago
- Website: sortis.com

SoHi Brands (formerly Sortis Holdings) is a private equity firm. It was established in 1995.

Businesses owned by the company have included Ava Gene's, Bamboo Sushi, the defunct restaurant Cicoria, Rudy's Barbershop, Sizzle Pie, and Tusk.
