= 2017 Edmonton municipal election =

Municipal election in Canada

- October 16, 2017

Mayor and 12 councillors to Edmonton City Council
- Turnout: 31.5% (▼3.0 pp)
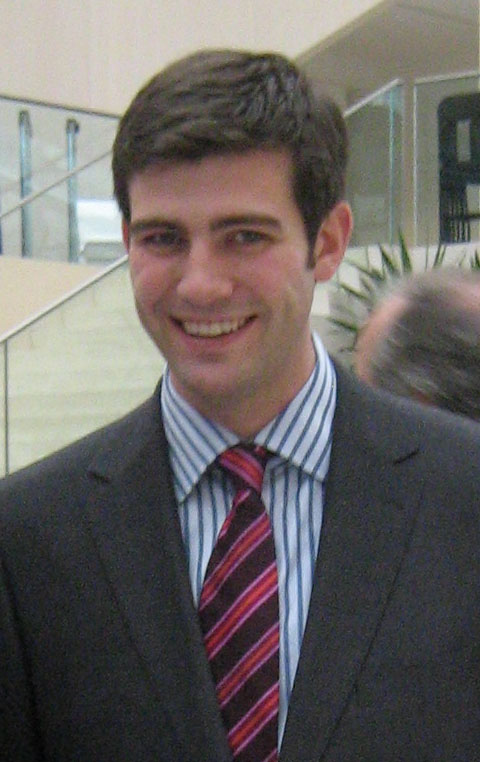

Candidate	Don Iveson	Don Koziak	Steven Charles Shewchuk
Popular vote	141,182	13,204	9,716
Percentage	73.6%	6.78%	4.99%
Mayor before election
Don Iveson
Elected mayor
Don Iveson

The 2017 Edmonton municipal election was held Monday, October 16, 2017, to elect a mayor and 12 councillors to the city council, the nine trustees to Edmonton Public Schools, and the seven trustees to the Edmonton Catholic Schools. One incumbent public school trustee had no challenger so was elected by acclamation; for the other eight balloting was conducted.

They were all elected to four year terms in single-member wards. All contests were conducted according to the first past the post (FPTP) system. Although FPTP elects the candidate that receives the most votes, it does not always produce a winner that has received over 50% of the votes. The winner in seven of the 12 city councillor contests was elected with less than a majority of the votes cast.

Since 2013, provincial legislation has required every municipality to hold quadrennial elections. The voter turnout was 31.5% with 194,826 ballots cast out of the 618,564 estimate eligible voters.

== Candidates ==
Bold indicates elected, italics indicates incumbent.

=== Mayor ===
Candidate	Votes	%
**Don Iveson**	141,182	73.6
Don Koziak	13,204	6.9
Steven Charles Shewchuk	9,716	5.1
Fahad Mughal	6,626	3.5
Justin Thomas	4,976	2.6
Mike Butler	4,028	2.1
Carla Frost	3,067	1.6
Taz Bouchier	2,782	1.5
Henry Mak	1,531	0.8
Ron Cousineau	1,252	0.7
Neil Stephens	1,231	0.64
Bob Ligertwood	1,129	0.59
Gordon Nikolic	1,062	0.55

- Taz Bouchier Native activist - finished eleventh in the 2013 Ward 6 race
- Mike Butler - finished thirteenth in the 2016 Ward 12 by-election race
- Ron Cousineau - a retired partner of the Oil City Energy Services
- Carla Frost - finished fifth in the 2010 Ward 6 race
- Don Iveson - incumbent
- Don Koziak - finished second in the 2007 Mayor race
- Bob Ligertwood - finished seventh in the 2010 Mayor race
- Henry Mak - finished seventh in the 2007 Ward 3 race
- Fahad Mughal - former City of Edmonton employee
- Gordon Nikolic - business owner
- Steven Charles Shewchuk - business owner
- Neil Stephens - businessman
- Justin Thomas - EPS officer

=== Ward 1 ===
Candidate	Votes	%
**Andrew Knack**	10,091	68.8
Dave Olivier	2,541	17.3
Randy Allen	1,066	7.3
Reuben Avellana	966	6.6

- Randy Allen -
- Reuben Avellana - game designer
- Andrew Knack - incumbent
- Dave Olivier - businessman

=== Ward 2 ===
Candidate	Votes	%
**Bev Esslinger**	7,475	55.4
Ali Haymour	3,240	24.0
Shelley Tupper	2,783	20.6

- Bev Esslinger - incumbent
- Ali Haymour - Alberta Sheriff
- Shelly Tupper - finished third in the 2010 Ward 2 race

=== Ward 3 ===
Candidate	Votes	%
**Jon Dziadyk**	4,354	29.6
Dave Loken	3,890	26.4
Karen Principe	3,335	22.7
John Oplanich	1,647	11.2
Sarmad Rasheed	1,493	10.1

- Jon Dziadyk - urban planner
- Dave Loken - incumbent
- John Oplanich - finished third in the 2010 Ward 3 race
- Karen Principe - dental hygienist
- Sarmad Rasheed - business owner

=== Ward 4 ===
Candidate	Votes	%
**Aaron Paquette**	3,455	23.8
Rocco Caterina	2,517	17.3
Alison Poste	1,835	12.6
Tricia Velthuizen	1,572	10.8
Hassan Haymour	1,250	8.6
Martin Narsing	1,097	7.6
Justin Draper	1,045	7.2
Beatrice Kerubo Ghettuba	765	5.3
Felix Amenaghawon	478	3.3
Sam Hachem	279	1.9
Emerson Mayers	175	1.2
Wade Izzard	53	0.4

- Felix Amenaghawon - engineer
- Rocco Caterina - son of Tony Caterina. (under criminal charges in July 2026)
- Justin Draper - activist and policy analyst
- Beatrice Kerubo Ghettuba - chartered accountant
- Sam Hachem - finished second in the 2013 Ward 4 race
- Hassan Haymour - engineer
- Wade Izzard - Kelly Services employee
- Emerson Mayers - nurse
- Martin Narsing - former Royal Canadian Navy officer
- Aaron Paquette - artist and author
- Alison Poste - Government of Alberta employee
- Tricia Velthuizen - political staffer

=== Ward 5 ===
Candidate	Votes	%
**Sarah Hamilton**	6,156	35.5
David Xiao	3,626	20.9
Dawn Newton	2,195	12.7
Miranda Jimmy	2,065	11.9
Nafisa Bowen	1,165	6.7
Svetlana Pavlenko	953	5.5
James Prentice	660	3.8
Brian Kendrick	304	1.8
Philip Michael Asher	216	1.2

- Philip Michael Asher - former councillor in Fort Nelson
- Nafisa Bowen - development officer of Stollery Children's Hospital
- Sarah Hamilton - business owner
- Miranda Jimmy - program manager
- Brian Kendrick - finished third in the 2010 Ward 5 race
- Dawn Newton - senior manager of Telus
- Svetlana Pavlenko - executive manager
- James Prentice - Government of Alberta employee
- David Xiao - former MLA

=== Ward 6 ===
Candidate	Votes	%
**Scott McKeen**	7,774	50.6
Bill Knight	4,958	32.3
Tish George Prouse	2,202	14.3
Adil Pirbhai	429	2.8

- Scott McKeen - incumbent
- Bill Knight - entrepreneur
- Adil Pirbhai - finished seventh in the 1998 Ward 5 race
- Tish George Prouse - finished fourth in the 2013 Ward 7 race

=== Ward 7 ===
Candidate	Votes	%
**Tony Caterina**	4,017	34.1
Kris Andreychuk	3,852	32.7
Mimi Williams	2,164	18.3
Liz John-West	1,153	9.8
Matthew Kleywegt	341	2.9
Andrzej Gudanowski	267	2.3

- Tony Caterina - incumbent
- Kris Andreychuk - social worker
- Andrzej Gudanowski - finished thirteenth in the 2013 Ward 6 race
- Liz John-West - social worker
- Matthew Kleywegt - graduation facilitator
- Mimi Williams - finished third in both the 2001 Ward 2 race and the 2013 Ward 7 race

=== Ward 8 ===
Candidate	Votes	%
**Ben Henderson**	6,235	36.9
Kirsten Goa	3,890	23.0
James Kosowan	3,430	20.3
Eli Schrader	2,056	12.2
Rob Bernshaw	688	4.1
Heather Workman	615	3.6

- Ben Henderson - incumbent
- Rob Bernshaw - finished third in the 2013 Ward 3 race
- Kirsten Goa - government employee
- James Kosowan - Edmonton Public Schools employee
- Eli Schrader - entrepreneur
- Heather Workman - finished second in the 2013 Ward 8 race

=== Ward 9 ===
Candidate	Votes	%
**Tim Cartmell**	9,160	42.0
Rob Agostinis	4,763	21.8
Sandy Pon	3,480	16.0
Payment Parseyan	3,340	15.3
Mark Hope	1,057	4.8

- Rob Agostinis - physician
- Tim Cartmell - engineer
- Mark Hope - entrepreneur
- Payment Parseyan - business owner
- Sandy Pon - realtor

=== Ward 10 ===
Candidate	Votes	%
**Michael Walters**	11,678	59.5
Vieri Berretti	5,282	26.9
Sim Senol	1,154	5.9
Samantha Hees	855	4.4
Glenda K. Williams	642	3.3

- Vieri Berretti - businessman
- Samantha Hees - UofA administrator
- Sim Senol - UofA employee
- Michael Walters - incumbent
- Glenda K. Williams - former reporter

=== Ward 11 ===
Candidate	Votes	%
**Mike Nickel**	9,148	56.0
Keren Tang	4,361	26.7
Brandy Burdeniuk	1,336	8.2
Chris Christianson	684	4.2
Troy Pavlek	567	3.5
Rob Aromin	243	1.5

- Rob Armin - finished eighth in the 2013 Ward 11 race
- Brandy Burdeniuk - co-founder of EccoAmmo
- Chris Christianson - Government of Alberta public servant
- Mike Nickel - incumbent
- Troy Pavlek - software developer
- Keren Tang - civil servant

=== Ward 12 ===
Candidate	Votes	%
**Moe Banga**	6,636	45.9
Jo-Anne Wright	3,378	23.4
Mike Russnak	1,798	12.4
Nigel Logan	1,645	11.4
Walter Youb	1,002	6.9

- Moe Banga - incumbent
- Nigel Logan - NDP MP constituency assistant
- Mike Russnak - business manager
- Jo-Anne Wright - government employee
- Walter Youb - supply chain consultant

=== Public school trustees ===
Candidate	Votes	%
Ward A
**Cheryl Johner**	5,068	35.61
Ahmed Knowmadic Ali	3,294	23.15
James Gault	1,120	7.87
Thomas Deak	978	6.87
Perry Chahal	965	6.78
Joseph Luri	924	6.49
George Chung Yan Lam	760	5.34
Ward B
**Michelle Draper**	**Acclaimed**	
Ward C
**Shelagh Dunn**	6,883	45.69
Orville Chubb	2,741	18.19
Jon Hoffman	2,320	15.4
Kurt Otto Kronebusch	1,473	9.78
Ward D
**Trisha Estabrooks**	8,494	44.67
Kevin O'Connor	4,591	24.14
Jeff Behrens	1,659	8.72
Tamie Perryment	1,499	7.88
Ward E
**Ken Gibson**	8,752	53.59
Sam Filice	3,599	22.04
Chris Hurley	2,021	12.38
Ward F
**Michael Janz**	15,671	71.4
Yemi Philip	4,220	19.23
Ward G
**Bridget Stirling**	10,119	62.73
Tyler Duce	4,762	29.52
Ward H
**Nathan Ip**	10,479	66.59
Neda Asadi	4,044	25.7
Ward I
**Sherry Adams**	6,720	59.01
Saira Wagner	2,589	22.74
Sajida Asghar	1,298	11.4

=== Separate school trustees ===
Candidate	Votes	%
Ward 71
**Terry Harris**	3,742	63.67
Mara Jan Suchy	1,705	29.01
Ward 72
**Sandra Palazzo**	4,503	57.89
Dan Posa	1,471	18.91
Mina Angotti	812	10.44
Rudy Arcilla	626	8.05
Ward 73
**Carla Smiley**	2,846	44.69
Peter Davis	1,763	27.68
Jeff Lee	825	12.95
Bernadette Iahtail	454	7.13
Ward 74
**Debbie Engel**	4,285	60.26
Gabrielle Johnson	2,441	34.33
Ward 75
**Alene Mutala**	2,722	32.38
Glen Argan	2,377	28.28
Michael Brown	2,343	27.87
Ward 76
**Lisa Turchansky**	4,886	53.44
Marilyn Bergstra	3,839	41.99
Ward 77
**Laura Thibert**	3,297	50.86
Kara Pelech	1,653	25.5
Kristin Heimbecker	1,218	18.79
