= Mike Nickel =

Canadian politician (born 1965)

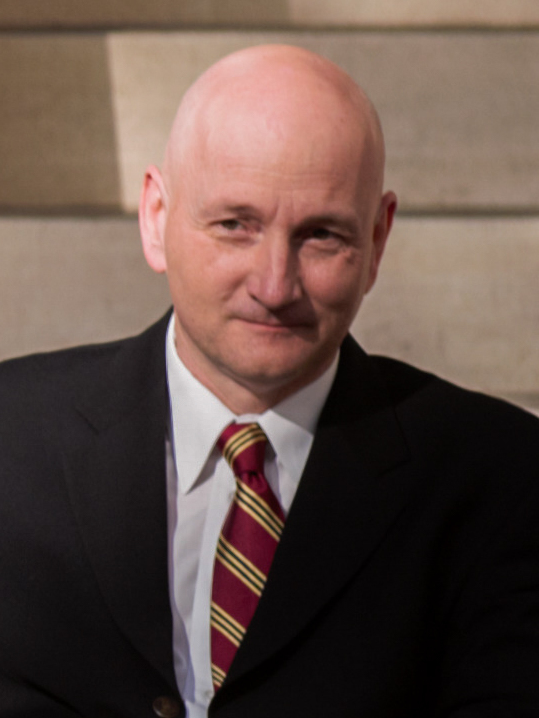
- Nickel in 2016

Member of the Edmonton City Council
- In office October 29, 2013 – October 26, 2021
- Preceded by: Kerry Diotte
- Succeeded by: Keren Tang
- Constituency: Ward 11
- In office 2004–2007 Serving with Bryan Anderson
- Preceded by: Larry Langley
- Succeeded by: Don Iveson
- Constituency: Ward 5

Personal details
- Born: April 27, 1965 (age 61) Edmonton, Alberta, Canada
- Party: United Conservative
- Spouse: Leanne
- Children: 2
- Education: University of Alberta
- Occupation: Politician

Mike Nickel (born April 27, 1965) is a Canadian politician who served as an Edmonton city councillor from 2004 to 2007, and then again from 2013 to 2021.

== Early life and education ==
Nickel was born in Edmonton and attended the University of Alberta, earning a bachelor's degree in political science in 1989 and subsequently a master's degree in statistics and media studies. During his time at university, Nickel served as president of the University of Alberta Students' Union from 1985 to 1986 and was active in the Delta Kappa Epsilon fraternity.

== Political career ==
In 1995, Nickel was a founding member of the Edmonton Stickmen, a group of young business people who were critical of then-mayor Jan Reimer for what they saw as anti-business policies. Reimer was defeated in that election by Bill Smith, against whom Nickel ran unsuccessfully in the 1998 and 2001 municipal elections, finishing second and third, respectively.

In 2004, Nickel was elected to Edmonton's city council from Ward 5. While in office, he developed a reputation for opposing tax increases, councillor pay increases, and a wide variety of regulations that he saw as wasteful, inefficient, or interfering with the ability of businesspeople to make a living. He sought a second term in the 2007 election, but was defeated by Don Iveson, finishing third out of four candidates.

In the 2013 Edmonton municipal election, Nickel was elected as the councillor for Ward 11 and Iveson was elected mayor of Edmonton. Both were re-elected in the 2017 election, in the same positions.

While continuing to hold the elected municipal office for Ward 11, Nickel became a United Conservative Party nomination candidate for the electoral riding of Edmonton-South in the 2019 Alberta general election. Nickel stated that he felt he had done all he could at the municipal level and would like to help the United Conservative Party with good urban policy, platform, and narrative. He lost the nomination to Tunde Obasan, who was defeated in the general election by New Democrat Thomas Dang.

In July 2020, Nickel received several complaints from the public regarding several of his social media posts. This led to a report authored by the City of Edmonton Integrity Commissioner Jamie Pytel, which found that the posts were "disrespectful, lacked decorum, contained personal attacks, and misleading information", and that they contravened city council's Code of Conduct. Nickel maintained the posts were truthful and inoffensive. Following the release of the report, city council voted 8–4 in favour of sanctions—one vote short of the supermajority needed, and Nickel was not reprimanded.

After a long period of uncertainty about his intentions, Mike Nickel announced in January 2021 that he would be running for mayor in the 2021 Edmonton municipal election, marking his third run for the post. He finished second with 25% of the vote, losing to Amarjeet Sohi.

Nickel was again found in violation of city council's Code of Conduct by Commissioner Pytel in June 2021, for two separate matters. The first involved two social media posts in April, which Pytel said Nickel had posted in retaliation to people who had prior complaints against him; the second was related to Nickel using email addresses obtained through his duties as councillor for electoral campaign purposes. Given these two violations and Nickel's previous actions, Pytel recommended council censure Nickel as well as issue a letter of reprimand. Nickel's legal defence disputed the violations, saying that his "attacks" were directed at ideas and not people. A hearing was held on June 24 regarding Nickel's use of the email addresses, where a motion to issue an official letter of reprimand was defeated 7–4, failing to gain the required supermajority.
