= Bamboo Sushi =

Chain of Japanese restaurants based in Portland, Oregon, U.S.

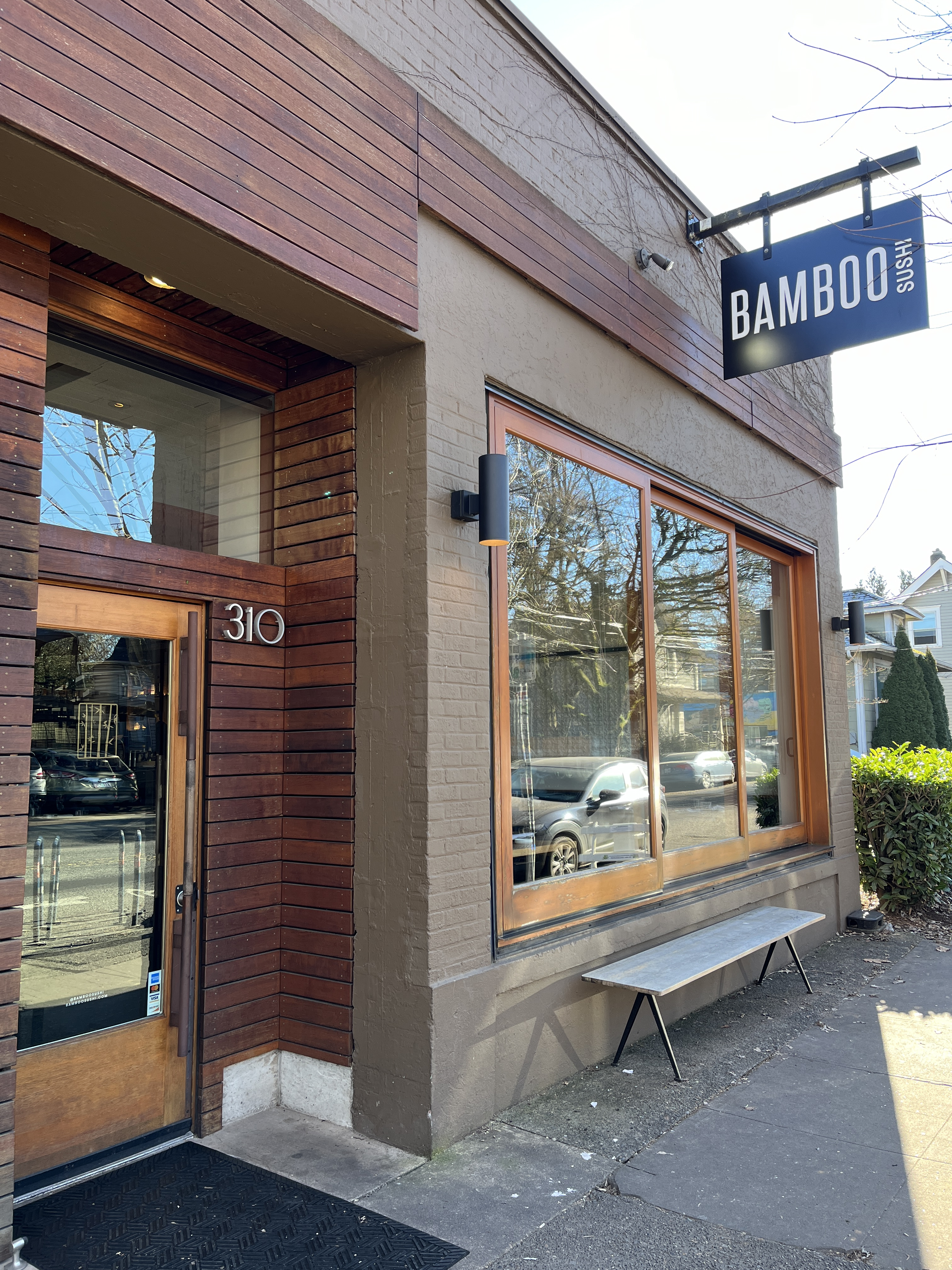
- Exterior of a restaurant in southeast Portland, Oregon, in 2025
- Interactive map of Bamboo Sushi

Restaurant information
- Established: 2008
- Owner: SoHi Brands
- Previous owner: Sustainable Restaurant Company
- Head chef: Kristofor Lofgren
- Food type: Japanese
- Location: 310 Southeast 28th Avenue, Portland, Oregon, United States
- Coordinates: 45.520215°N 122.637130°W
- Website: bamboosushi.com

Bamboo Sushi is a small chain of Japanese restaurants based in Portland, Oregon, United States. The business has also operated in Beaverton, Denver, Lake Oswego, and Seattle. Bamboo Sushi is owned by SoHi Brands (formerly known as Sortis Holdings) and was previously owned by Sustainable Restaurant Company. Michelle Andersen is the chief executive officer of Bamboo Sushi.

== History and locations ==
Kristofor Lofgren started Bamboo Sushi in 2008.

There were five locations in Portland, and one each in Denver and Seattle's University District, as of 2019.

In May 2020, Sustainable Restaurant Group, parent company of Bamboo Sushi, filed for Chapter 11 bankruptcy protection due to the COVID-19 pandemic. The company was acquired by SoHi Brands (formerly known as Sortis Holdings) in July 2020.

Bamboo Sushi opened in Beaverton in August 2022.

== Reception ==
Bamboo Sushi won in the Best Place to Eat Sustainably and Best Sushi categories of Willamette Week's annual 'Best of Portland' readers' poll in 2015. The business won in the latter category again in 2022, 2024, 2025, and 2026. Becca Yanez included Bamboo Sushi in KOIN's 2026 list of the city's five best sushi restaurants, according to Yelp reviews.

== See also ==
- List of Japanese restaurants
- List of restaurant chains in the United States
- List of sushi restaurants
