= Jagsharan Singh Mahal =

Canadian politician

Jagsharan Singh Mahal MP
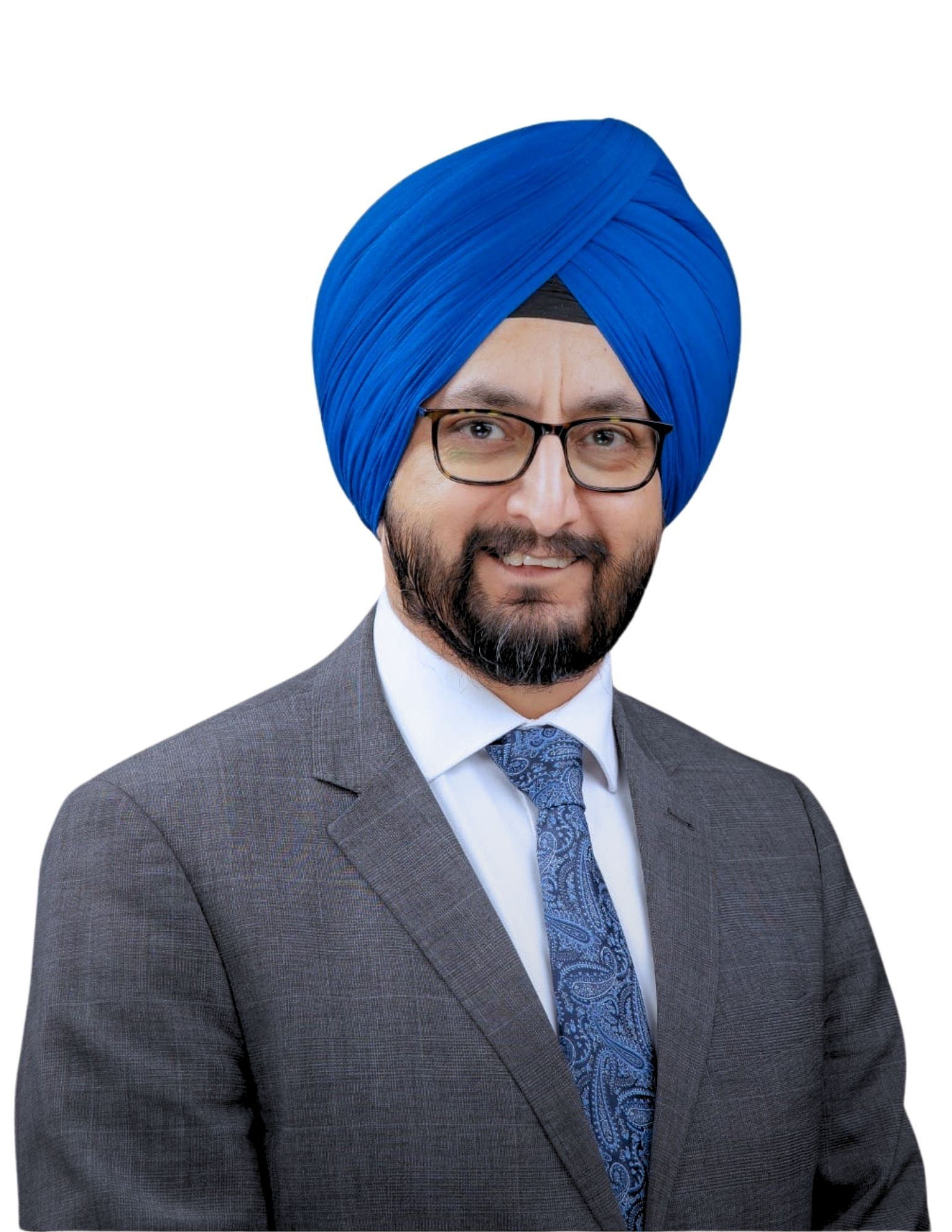

Member of Parliament for Edmonton Southeast
- Incumbent
- Assumed office April 28, 2025
- Preceded by: riding recreated

Personal details
- Born: Amritsar, India
- Party: Conservative
- Website: www.jagmahal.com

Jagsharan Singh Mahal MP is a Canadian politician from the Conservative Party of Canada. He was elected Member of Parliament for Edmonton Southeast in the 2025 Canadian federal election. He defeated former Mayor of Edmonton Amarjeet Sohi. Mahal is a lawyer by profession.

== Electoral record ==
2025 Canadian federal election: Edmonton Southeast
| Party | Candidate | Votes | % | ±% | Expenditures |
|---|---|---|---|---|---|
| Conservative | Jagsharan Singh Mahal | 25,206 | 52.88 | +15.18 | $99,104.56 |
| Liberal | Amarjeet Sohi | 18,481 | 38.77 | +4.77 | none listed |
| New Democratic | Harpreet Grewal | 2,536 | 5.32 | –17.00 | $10,271.96 |
| People's | Martin Schuetza | 881 | 1.85 | –3.83 | none listed |
| Independent | Gurleen Chandi | 292 | 0.61 | – | none listed |
| Communist | Corinne Benson | 268 | 0.56 | +0.29 | none listed |
| Total valid votes/expense limit | | 47,664 | 99.06 | – | $123,761.55 |
| Total rejected ballots | | 452 | 0.94 | +0.61 | |
| Turnout | | 48,116 | 66.56 | +4.73 | |
| Eligible voters | | 72,286 | | | |
| Conservative gain from Liberal | | Swing | | +9.98 | |
Source: Elections Canada
