= Cicoria (restaurant) =

Defunct restaurant in Portland, Oregon, U.S.

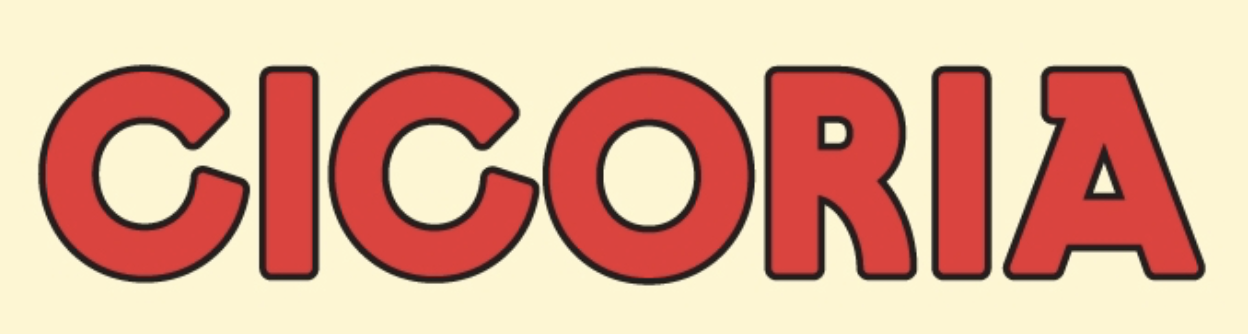

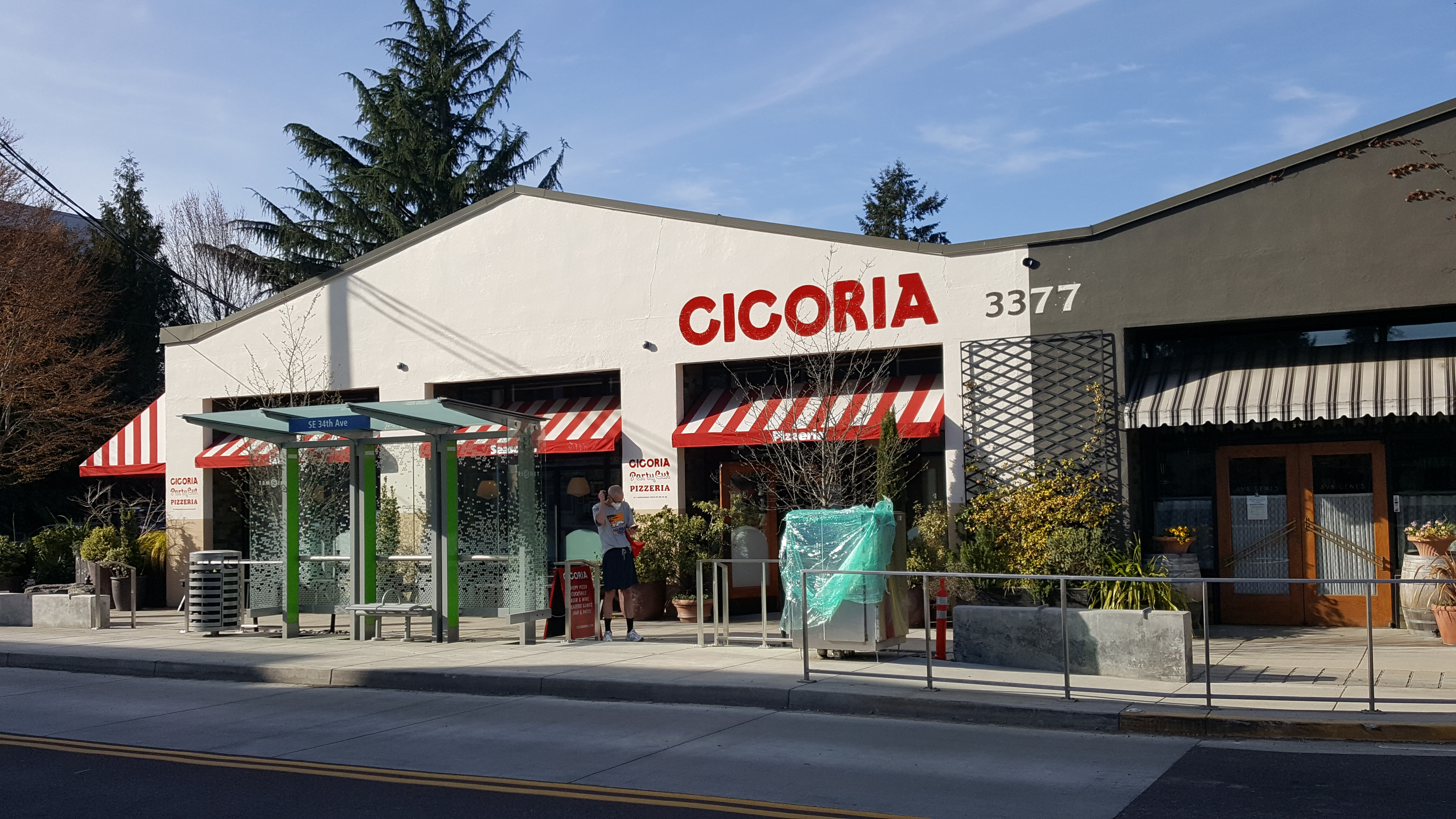
- The restaurant's exterior in 2022
- Interactive map of Cicoria

Restaurant information
- Location: 3377 Southeast Division Street, Portland, Multnomah, Oregon, 97202, United States
- Coordinates: 45.5049°N 122.6300°W
- Website: cicoriapdx.com

Cicoria was a restaurant in Portland, Oregon, United States. It was owned by SoHi Brands (formerly known as Sortis Holdings) via Submarine Hospitality. Joshua McFadden opened Cicoria in 2019. The restaurant closed permanently in 2024, despite having a generally positive reception.

== Description ==
The pizzeria and bar Cicoria operated on Division Street in southeast Portland's Richmond neighborhood. Michael Russell of The Oregonian described the 75-seat restaurant as a "Midwestern tavern pizzeria". Karen Brooks of Portland Monthly called the business a "Midwest-meets-Rome" pizzeria, and the magazine's Matthew Trueherz said Cicoria was a "Midwestern-inspired pizza tavern". Eater Portland called the restaurant an "'80s-Scorsese-vibed" pizzeria, serving pies combining Brooklyn-, Midwestern-, and Roman-style pizzas.

In addition to pizzas, Cicoria served pastas and salads. The business was described as a "sister" establishment to next door Ava Gene's.

== History ==
Joshua McFadden opened the restaurant in 2019, in the space that previously housed Roman Candle.

In June 2024, SoHi Brands (formerly known as Sortis Holdings) announced plans to close Cicoria permanently on June 29. A press release read, "The decision to cease operations has been driven by the increasingly challenging market conditions that have made it difficult to sustain the restaurant. The team at Cicoria expresses deep gratitude to its loyal customers, dedicated staff, and the entire community for their unwavering support."

== Reception ==
In 2022, during the COVID-19 pandemic, Cicoria (as well as Cafe Olli, Dimo's Apizza, Jerry's Pizza, and Pizza Thief) were named on The Oregonian's list of Portland's best new pizzerias. Michael Russell later included Cicoria in the newspaper's list of the 21 "most painful" restaurant and bar closures of 2024. Lindsay D. Mattison ranked the business twelfth in Tasting Table's 2023 list of Portland's "absolute best" pizza.
