= Don Iveson =

Canadian politician

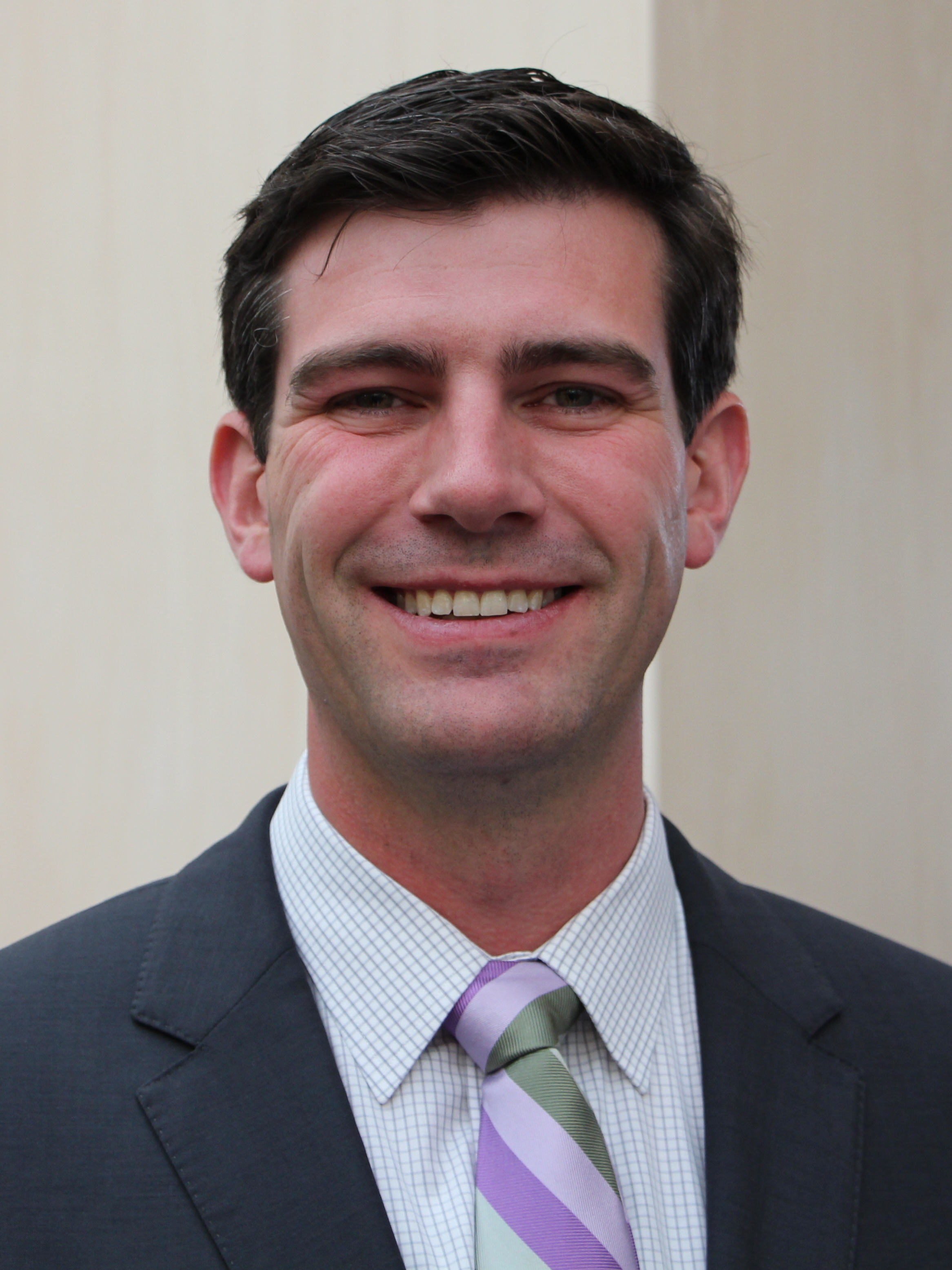
- Iveson in 2013

35th Mayor of Edmonton
- In office October 29, 2013 – October 26, 2021
- Preceded by: Stephen Mandel
- Succeeded by: Amarjeet Sohi

Member of the Edmonton City Council
- In office 2010–2013
- Preceded by: New ward
- Succeeded by: Michael Walters
- Constituency: Ward 10
- In office 2007–2010
- Preceded by: Mike Nickel
- Succeeded by: Ward abolished
- Constituency: Ward 5

Personal details
- Born: May 30, 1979 (age 47) St. Albert, Alberta, Canada
- Spouse: Sarah Chan (div. 2022)
- Children: 2
- Education: University of Alberta
- Website: www.doniveson.ca

Donald L. Iveson (born May 30, 1979) is a Canadian politician who served as mayor of Edmonton from 2013 to 2021. He was first elected as mayor in the 2013 municipal election with 62% of the vote, and was re-elected in 2017 with 73.6% of the vote. Prior to serving as Mayor, Iveson was a member of Edmonton City Council from 2007 to 2013.

== Early life ==
Iveson was born in St. Albert, Alberta in 1979. He grew up in Parkallen, Edmonton, the only child of Margaret, an education professor at the University of Alberta, and Bob Iveson, a sculptor. As a child, Iveson loved books, both fiction and non-, reading C. S. Forester's Horatio Hornblower series by seventh grade. He was also active in scouting and debate. He earned a Bachelor of Arts in political science from the University of Alberta in 2001. While there, he served as managing editor of The Gateway, the university's student newspaper. He did the last year of his degree on exchange at the University of Toronto, and stayed in Toronto upon his graduation to serve as president of the Canadian University Press for a year. Two years as business manager of The Gateway followed before he took a job as advocacy director with the University of Alberta Students' Union. There, he played a leading role in negotiations with the City of Edmonton for the development of a Universal Transit Pass for University of Alberta students. He left the position in 2007, and entered politics shortly thereafter.

== Political career ==
Iveson first sought political office in the 2007 municipal election, when he ran for the Edmonton City Council in ward 5. Both of the ward's incumbents, Bryan Anderson and Mike Nickel, were seeking re-election. His campaign stressed improved transit services, densification of housing, and increased affordable housing, and won endorsements from former councillors Larry Langley, Janice Melnychuk, Michael Phair, and Gene Dub, and members of the Legislative Assembly of Alberta Don Massey and Raj Pannu. In a result that media sources called the election's biggest surprise, Iveson finished more than two thousand votes ahead of Nickel (although more than one thousand behind Anderson) to capture the ward's second council seat.

After taking office, Iveson was assigned the environmental portfolio by mayor Stephen Mandel. In this capacity, he attended the 2007 United Nations Climate Change Conference in Bali, Indonesia. He has also endorsed a municipal tax on plastic bags and a reduction of cosmetic pesticide use, although he stopped short of endorsing the ban called for by the Canadian Cancer Society.

In response to the news that municipal spending would necessitate larger than normal property tax increases in 2008 and 2009, Iveson expressed support for maintaining levels of spending, saying that he was "tired of this city cheaping out". He later clarified that he was referring principally to needed infrastructure investment. He advocated a more progressive taxation scheme that better matched household impact, possibly substituting more stable fee-based revenue for property taxes that were subject to variation based on fluctuating property value.

On June 18, 2013, Iveson announced that he would run for Mayor in the 2013 municipal election, as Mayor Stephen Mandel had announced he would not seek a fourth term. On October 21, Iveson won with 61.88% of the vote with a 33% voter turnout. He was sworn into office on October 29, 2013. Iveson is known to be an advocate in support of LGBTQ rights, attending the Mayor's Pride Brunch in 2014. On June 9, 2015, Iveson fostered controversy as he tweeted about a link between the fatal shooting of Edmonton Police Service Constable Daniel Woodall and the cancellation of the federal gun registry. Iveson took the tweet down from his Twitter account later that day.

On October 16, 2017, Iveson was re-elected mayor of Edmonton, winning by a large margin with 73.61% of the vote. Iveson did not seek re-election in the 2021 municipal election.

== Career post-politics ==
Since leaving politics, Iveson has worked as Executive Advisor for Climate Investing and Community Resilience with Co-Operators Insurance since 2022, and as Chair of the Canadian Mortgage and Housing Corporation Board of Directors since 2024.

== Personal life ==
Iveson is divorced. He was formerly married to Sarah Chan, a music teacher. The couple have a son and a daughter together. He is an avid sailor, and once taught the sport at Lake Wabamun. He is also a fan of Star Trek and Arcade Fire.

In 2011 Iveson appeared in a video promoting the Edmonton Transit System with Edmonton-based singer Colleen Brown, who performed "Happy Love Song" on a bus.
