= Duane Sorenson =

American restaurateur

- Occupation: Restaurateur

Duane Sorenson is an American business owner and restaurateur based in Portland, Oregon. His companies and restaurants have included Stumptown Coffee Roasters, Roman Candle (later converted into a cafe called Holiday), and Puff Coffee. Sorenson is originally from Puyallup, Washington.
