= Sizzle Pie =

Pizza restaurant chain based in Portland, Oregon, U.S.

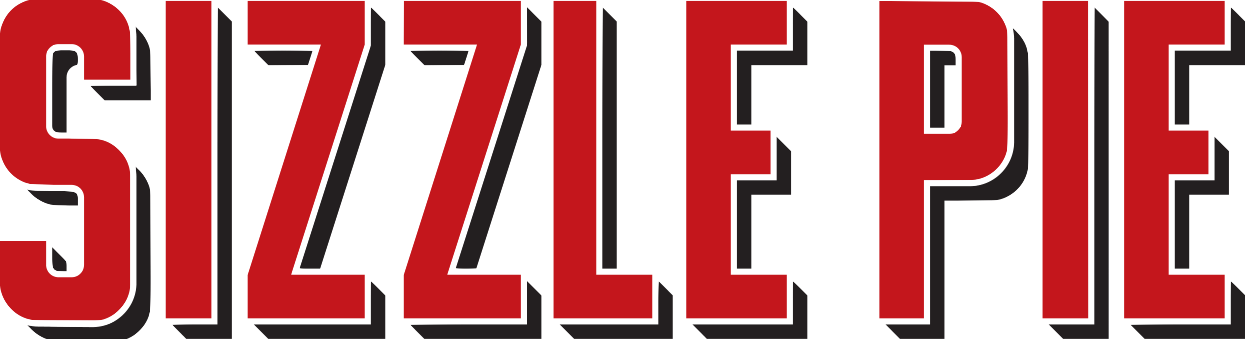
- Logo

- Exterior of a restaurant in Portland, Oregon, 2022
- Headquarters: Portland, Oregon, United States
- Brands: Pizza Party HQ
- Website: sizzlepie.com

Sizzle Pie is a pizza restaurant chain with two locations in Portland, Oregon, United States.

== History ==
As part of the COVID-19 pandemic, the company received between $1 million and $2 million in federally backed small business loans from Heritage Bank as part of the Paycheck Protection Program.

Pizza Party HQ is a brand of Sizzle Pie.

After a sale in 2023, Sortis Capital (formerly known as Sortis Holdings) is currently the majority shareholder of Sizzle Pie.

The location had about six locations in Portland/Beaverton area and presence outside the Portland area in Eugene, Oregon,Seattle and New York for varying durations. As of October 2026, the chain has shrunk to two locations, both of which are located in Portland.

== Reception ==
Sizzle Pie was a runner-up in the Best Pizza category of Willamette Week's annual 'Best of Portland' readers' poll in 2016. It won and ranked second in the same category in 2017 and in 2022, respectively.

== See also ==
- List of companies based in Oregon
- List of pizza chains of the United States
- Pizza in Portland, Oregon
