= Edmonton Southeast =

Federal electoral district in Alberta, Canada

Alberta electoral district
- Interactive map of riding boundaries from the 2025 federal election

Federal electoral district
- Legislature: House of Commons
MP
Jagsharan Singh Mahal
Conservative
- District created: 1987
- First contested: 1988
- Last contested: 2025
- District webpage: profile, map

Demographics
- Population (2021): 113,208
- Electors (2025): 70,526
- Area (km²): 71
- Pop. density (per km²): 1,594.5
- Census division: Division No. 11
- Census subdivision: Edmonton (part)

Edmonton Southeast (French: Edmonton-Sud-Est) is a federal electoral district in Alberta that has been represented in the House of Commons of Canada since 2025. A riding of the same name previously existed from 1988 to 2004.

== Geography ==
Edmonton Southeast is located in the city of Edmonton in the province of Alberta. It was re-created by the 2022 Canadian federal electoral redistribution. The riding was formed from the eastern half of Edmonton Mill Woods, with its southern boundary extended to reach Edmonton's expanded city limits.

== Demographics ==
According to the 2021 Canadian census

Languages: 54.5% English, 20.3% Punjabi, 4.5% Tagalog, 2.5% Gujarati, 2.1% Hindi, 1.9% Spanish, 1.9% French, 1.8% Urdu, 1.0% Malayalam

Religions: 36.3% Christian (18.4% Catholic, 1.5% United Church, 1.3% Pentecostal, 1.1% Lutheran, 14.0% Other), 23.7% No religion, 23.0% Sikh, 9.4% Hindu, 6.1% Muslim

Median income: $40,800 (2020)

Average income: $48,880 (2020)

Panethnic groups in Edmonton Southeast (2021)
| Panethnic group | 2021 | |
| Panethnic group | Pop. | % |
|---|---|---|
| South Asian | 43,940 | 39.1% |
| European (Note: Statistic includes all persons that did not make up part of a visible minority or an indigenous identity.) | 39,585 | 35.22% |
| Southeast Asian (Note: Statistic includes total responses of "Filipino" and "Southeast Asian" under visible minority section on census.) | 11,450 | 10.19% |
| African | 5,130 | 4.56% |
| Indigenous | 4,450 | 3.96% |
| Latin American | 2,555 | 2.27% |
| East Asian (Note: Statistic includes total responses of "Chinese", "Korean", and "Japanese" under visible minority section on census.) | 2,285 | 2.03% |
| Middle Eastern (Note: Statistic includes total responses of "West Asian" and "Arab" under visible minority section on census.) | 1,135 | 1.01% |
| Other/multiracial (Note: Statistic includes total responses of "Visible minority, n.i.e." and "Multiple visible minorities" under visible minority section on census.) | 1,865 | 1.66% |
| Total responses | 112,385 | 99.27% |
| Total population | 113,210 | 100% |
Notes: Totals greater than 100% due to multiple origin responses. Demographics based on 2022 Canadian federal electoral redistribution riding boundaries.

== History ==
The original riding was created in 1987. In 2003, it was redistributed into the Edmonton—Beaumont and Edmonton—Strathcona ridings.

| Parliament | Years | Member | Party |
|---|---|---|---|
Edmonton Southeast; Riding created from Edmonton South, Edmonton—Strathcona, Pembina, and Wetaskiwin
| 34th | 1988–1990 | David Kilgour | Progressive Conservative |
| 34th | 1990–1990 | David Kilgour | Independent |
| 34th | 1990–1993 | David Kilgour | Liberal |
| 35th | 1993–1997 | David Kilgour | Liberal |
| 36th | 1997–2000 | David Kilgour | Liberal |
| 37th | 2000–2004 | David Kilgour | Liberal |
Riding dissolved into Edmonton—Beaumont and Edmonton—Strathcona
Riding re-created from Edmonton Mill Woods and Edmonton—Wetaskiwin
| 45th | 2025–present | Jagsharan Singh Mahal | Conservative |

== Election results ==
=== 2023 representation order ===
2025 Canadian federal election
| Party | Candidate | Votes | % | ±% | Expenditures |
|---|---|---|---|---|---|
| Conservative | Jagsharan Singh Mahal | 25,206 | 52.88 | +15.18 | $99,104.56 |
| Liberal | Amarjeet Sohi | 18,481 | 38.77 | +4.77 | none listed |
| New Democratic | Harpreet Grewal | 2,536 | 5.32 | –17.00 | $10,271.96 |
| People's | Martin Schuetza | 881 | 1.85 | –3.83 | none listed |
| Independent | Gurleen Chandi | 292 | 0.61 | – | none listed |
| Communist | Corinne Benson | 268 | 0.56 | +0.29 | none listed |
| Total valid votes/expense limit | | 47,664 | 99.06 | – | $123,761.55 |
| Total rejected ballots | | 452 | 0.94 | +0.61 | |
| Turnout | | 48,116 | 66.56 | +4.73 | |
| Eligible voters | | 72,286 | | | |
| Conservative gain from Liberal | | Swing | | +9.98 | |
Source: Elections Canada

2021 federal election redistributed results
| Party | Vote | % |
|---|---|---|
| Conservative | 15,597 | 37.70 |
| Liberal | 14,068 | 34.00 |
| New Democratic | 9,237 | 22.32 |
| People's | 2,352 | 5.68 |
| Others | 122 | 0.29 |

=== 1996 representation order ===
2000 Canadian federal election
| Party | Candidate | Votes | % | ±% | Expenditures |
|---|---|---|---|---|---|
| Liberal | David Kilgour | 21,109 | 50.87 | +4.89 | $59,600 |
| Alliance | Tim Uppal | 16,392 | 39.51 | –1.95 | $59,294 |
| Progressive Conservative | Allan Ryan | 2,269 | 5.47 | –0.75 | $870 |
| New Democratic | Joginder Kandola | 1,285 | 3.10 | –2.77 | $7,150 |
| Natural Law | Richard Shelford | 187 | 0.45 | –0.02 | none listed |
| Canadian Action | Michael Sekuloff | 154 | 0.37 | – | $1,475 |
| Communist | Matthew James | 97 | 0.23 | – | $238 |
| Total valid votes | | 41,493 | 99.67 | | |
| Total rejected ballots | | 139 | 0.33 | +0.15 | |
| Turnout | | 41,632 | 61.83 | +5.78 | |
| Eligible voters | | 67,337 | | | |
| Liberal hold | | Swing | | +3.42 | |
Source: Elections Canada

1997 Canadian federal election
| Party | Candidate | Votes | % | ±% | Expenditures |
|---|---|---|---|---|---|
| Liberal | David Kilgour | 14,745 | 45.98 | –0.18 | $23,451 |
| Reform | Eleanor Maroes | 13,295 | 41.46 | +1.73 | $31,536 |
| Progressive Conservative | Terence Bachor | 1,994 | 6.22 | –0.17 | $16,341 |
| New Democratic | Roberta Allen | 1,882 | 5.87 | +1.90 | $1,557 |
| Natural Law | Eshwar Jagdeo | 152 | 0.47 | +0.08 | none listed |
| Total valid votes | | 32,068 | 99.82 | | |
| Total rejected ballots | | 58 | 0.18 | –0.03 | |
| Turnout | | 32,126 | 56.05 | –9.10 | |
| Eligible voters | | 57,319 | | | |
| Liberal hold | | Swing | | –0.96 | |
Source: Elections Canada

=== 1987 representation order ===
1993 Canadian federal election
| Party | Candidate | Votes | % | ±% |
|---|---|---|---|---|
| Liberal | David Kilgour | 23,129 | 46.16 | +25.32 |
| Reform | Aurell Royer | 19,910 | 39.73 | +29.02 |
| Progressive Conservative | John Kurian | 3,203 | 6.39 | –42.28 |
| New Democratic | Ken Ross | 1,988 | 3.97 | –14.93 |
| National | Janet Blond | 1,457 | 2.91 | – |
| Natural Law | Richard Shelford | 194 | 0.39 | – |
| Green | Ed Schell | 149 | 0.30 | –0.08 |
| Canada Party | Michael Gushnowski | 78 | 0.16 | – |
| Total valid votes | | 50,108 | 99.79 | |
| Total rejected ballots | | 103 | 0.21 | +0.01 |
| Turnout | | 50,211 | 65.15 | –9.58 |
| Eligible voters | | 77,071 | | |
| Liberal gain from Progressive Conservative | | Swing | | +27.17 |
Source: Elections Canada

1988 Canadian federal election
| Party | Candidate | Votes | % | ±% |
|---|---|---|---|---|
| Progressive Conservative | David Kilgour | 23,597 | 48.67 | – |
| Liberal | Chris Peirce | 10,104 | 20.84 | – |
| New Democratic | Harbans Dhillon | 9,161 | 18.90 | – |
| Reform | Wes McLeod | 5,192 | 10.71 | – |
| Green | Harry Garfinkle | 184 | 0.38 | – |
| Confederation of Regions | Oran Johnson | 102 | 0.21 | – |
| Commonwealth of Canada | Dorothy Bohdan | 76 | 0.16 | – |
| Independent | Peggy Morton | 66 | 0.14 | – |
| Total valid votes | | 48,482 | 99.80 | |
| Total rejected ballots | | 97 | 0.20 | – |
| Turnout | | 48,579 | 74.73 | – |
| Eligible voters | | 65,007 | | |
| Progressive Conservative notional hold | | Swing | | N/A |
Source: Elections Canada

== See also ==
- List of Canadian electoral districts
- Historical federal electoral districts of Canada
