= Amarjeet Sohi =

Canadian politician (born 1964)

The Honourable Amarjeet Sohi PC
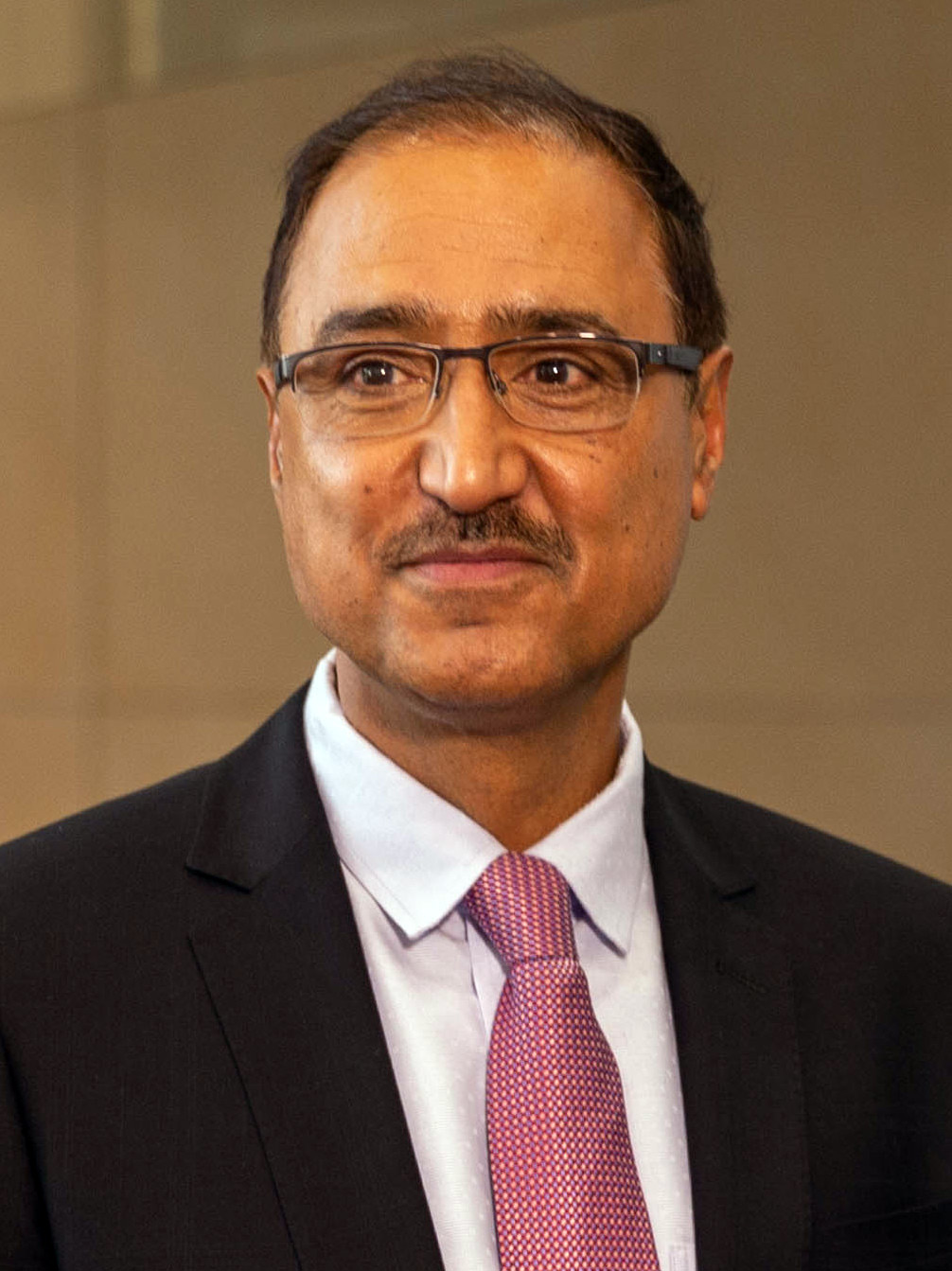
- Sohi in 2021

36th Mayor of Edmonton
- In office October 26, 2021 – October 29, 2025
- Preceded by: Don Iveson
- Succeeded by: Andrew Knack
29th Canadian Ministry
Minister of Natural Resources
In office July 18, 2018 – November 20, 2019
Prime Minister	Justin Trudeau
Preceded by	Jim Carr
Succeeded by	Seamus O'Regan
Minister of Infrastructure and Communities
In office November 4, 2015 – July 18, 2018
Prime Minister	Justin Trudeau
Preceded by	Denis Lebel (Infrastructure, Communities and Intergovernmental Affairs)
Succeeded by	François-Philippe Champagne
Parliamentary constituencies
Member of Parliament for Edmonton Mill Woods
In office October 19, 2015 – October 21, 2019
Preceded by	Riding established
Succeeded by	Tim Uppal
Member of the Edmonton City Council for Ward 12 (Ward 6; 2007–2010)
In office October 23, 2007 – November 2, 2015 Serving with Dave Thiele
Preceded by	Terry Cavanagh
Succeeded by	Mohinder Banga

Personal details
- Born: March 8, 1964 (age 62) Banbhaura, Punjab, India
- Party: Liberal (2015–present, federal); Independent (municipal)
- Website: www.mayorsohi.ca

Amarjeet Sohi PC (born March 8, 1964) is a Canadian politician who was the minister of infrastructure and communities, and from 2018 to 2019 as the minister of natural resources. Sohi previously sat as a Liberal member of Parliament (MP) and served in the federal Cabinet from 2015 to 2018. He served as the 36th mayor of Edmonton from 2021 to 2025.

Sohi was born in India and immigrated to Canada in 1981, initially working as a taxi driver in Edmonton. He returned to India in 1988, where he was detained and accused of terrorism. While in prison, he was subject to harsh treatment and solitary confinement. After spending 21 months in prison, Sohi was released due to a lack of evidence. Returning to Edmonton, he worked as a bus driver before entering politics.

Sohi was elected to the Edmonton City Council in the 2007 municipal election representing Ward 12, gaining his seat after finishing 4th place in the previous election. Following the 2015 federal election, he represented Edmonton Mill Woods in the House of Commons until his defeat in the 2019 election. During that time, he served as minister of natural resources from 2018 to 2019 and minister of infrastructure and communities from 2015 to 2018.

After his federal defeat, Sohi announced his candidacy for mayor of Edmonton in the 2021 Edmonton municipal election. He was elected as Edmonton's 36th mayor on October 18, 2021, becoming the first visible minority to serve as mayor. Jyoti Gondek was elected mayor of Calgary on the same day, with both Sohi and Gondek jointly sharing status as Canada's first Punjabi mayors of major cities.

In 2025, he announced a return to federal politics, saying that he would run as the Liberal candidate in Edmonton Southeast; he was defeated by Conservative candidate Jagsharan Singh Mahal. Following his loss, Sohi announced that he would not seek re-election as mayor in the 2025 municipal election.

== Early life ==
Sohi was born in 1964 in the farming community of Banbhaura, Sangrur district in the Indian state of Punjab, to a Sikh family. Sponsored by an elder brother, he emigrated to Edmonton in 1981. Initially speaking almost no English, Sohi took ESL classes and enrolled at Bonnie Doon Composite High School in Edmonton. While working as a taxi driver in Edmonton, he joined a local Punjabi language literary society and became an actor and playwright in a Punjabi theatre group.

Sohi married his wife Sarbjeet in 1993. Together they have one daughter, Seerat, a freelance basketball columnist.

== Detention in India ==
=== Background ===
By the early 1980s, the Khalistan movement, led by Sikhs demanding a homeland for themselves within India, had become very active, attracting support from many of the Indian Sikh diaspora in Canada. The movement soon developed into the Punjab insurgency, which polarised the Sikh community in Canada between Khalistani separatists and those supporting continued union with India. The agitation of the Sikhs in general further increased following the Indian Army's 1984 assault on the Harmandar Sahib complex and Akaal Takht, and the assassination of Indian Prime Minister Indira Gandhi by her Sikh bodyguards later that year. This was followed by the bombing of Air India Flight 182 in 1985, which was linked to Canadian Khalistani militants.

While Sohi and his family opposed the human rights abuses committed by the Indian government, they rejected religious fundamentalism. Describing himself as a "secular individual", Sohi did not wear a turban and grow his hair. The theatre group Sohi was involved in also opposed both fundamentalism and the repressive actions of the Indian government.

=== Arrest and detention ===
In April 1988, Sohi returned to India to study with Punjabi playwright and reformer Gursharan Singh and to visit family in Punjab. He soon joined an activist group advocating land reform in Bihar, one of India's poorest states. That November, Sohi went to a village in Bihar to organize a local protest, but was arrested on November 15, the night before when police raided the village. Sohi believed he was arrested due to his Sikh and Canadian background, which was linked with terrorism.

Immediately after his arrest, Sohi was taken to a local police station, where he was interrogated and tortured for the next week with repeated beatings, sleep deprivation and threats against his family. When he told his story to a district magistrate who had arrived to question him, she believed him and stopped the interrogations, permitting him to present his case in court though he was denied legal counsel. As Sohi had kept his Indian citizenship, he was denied access to Canadian diplomatic officers and held under India's Terrorist and Disruptive Activities (Prevention) Act (TADA). An anti-terrorism law passed as a result of the Punjab insurgency, it allowed suspects to be detained for up to two years without being charged. State authorities falsely accused Sohi of being a trained Khalistan fundamentalist who had arrived in Bihar to train Naxalite insurgents, claiming that his arrest established the presence of an international terrorist network and that he had been arrested in possession of a gun and ammunition supplied by Pakistan; the state director general of police issued a statement to The Hindu to that effect.

After his court appearance, Sohi was transferred to Gaya Central Prison in the city of Gaya, where he was kept in solitary confinement for the next 18 months. He was placed in a cell with a small window and no bed, and slept on a single blanket on the floor. "The food was horrible. A couple of chapatis in the morning. Some lentil stew in the evening with a couple of rotis. No vegetables or any meat." After four months, his father and brother were allowed to visit. Sohi managed to maintain his reason by making friends with the prison guards, and got a message out to the local newspapers through one of them, announcing he was going on a hunger strike for better food and library privileges. After a week on strike, Sohi's family were permitted to send him money, which he used to buy food from outside the prison. He was also allowed to use the prison library, which he credited for "[keeping him] alive" in prison.

=== Canadian response and release ===
Indian and Canadian journalists and activists, including members of Amnesty International, soon picked up Sohi's story. Through Progressive Conservative MP and human rights defender David Kilgour, Sohi's brother and sister-in-law pressured the Canadian government to exercise influence. The Canadian External Affairs ministry responded by stating they could not assist Sohi as he was only a landed immigrant in Canada and thus regarded by Indian authorities as an Indian national. Following an investigation, the Canadian Security Intelligence Service informed the Indian government that Sohi posed no threat. Sohi believed that the Bihar Police wanted to save themselves embarrassment, and thus persisted in claiming Sohi to be a terrorist, charging him with links to Pakistani terrorists, Naxalite insurgents, and the Tamil Tigers. Finally, the 1990 legislative elections in Bihar brought a change of government, and a new state prosecutor reviewed Sohi's case, ordering it to be dismissed as there was "a lack of evidence against Mr. Sohi and also his prosecution is against [the] public policy of the state." After 21 months in prison, 18 of them in solitary, Sohi was released to his parents' home in Punjab on July 9, 1990. After thanking those in Bihar who had helped him, Sohi returned to Edmonton.

== Return to Edmonton and entry into municipal politics ==
After returning to Edmonton, Sohi returned to being a taxi driver, before moving on to become a bus driver for the Edmonton Transit Service. He became a spokesperson for the Local 569 of the Amalgamated Transit Union; in 2000 he advocated for drivers of disability buses to receive fair benefits. Sohi also became active in politics, campaigning for the New Democratic Party and for then Liberal MP David Kilgour.

In Sohi's first municipal campaign in the 2004 Edmonton municipal election, he finished fourth behind incumbents Dave Thiele and Terry Cavanagh, along with Chinwe Okelu. Sohi's second campaign in the 2007 elections was successful, winning a Council seat in Ward 6. On the City Council, Sohi has served as a member of the Edmonton Police Commission, as vice president of the Alberta Urban Municipalities Association, and as Council sponsor for Safedmonton, a citywide committee working on community solutions for crime prevention. Sohi carried this work forward as advisor to the REACH Edmonton Council for Safe Communities.

Sohi also held the council portfolio for Multiculturalism, and has championed the Racism Free Edmonton initiative. He has sponsored or co-sponsored council initiatives on Seniors and on Poverty Elimination, and co-launched an initiative to end gender-based violence.

After completing two terms as a councillor, it was widely acknowledged that Sohi was contemplating a mayoral run in the 2013 municipal election. He ultimately announced that he would not enter the race and would instead seek re-election for his Ward 12 seat.

=== Awards ===
Sohi received several community awards during time on city council. In 2014, he received the John Humphrey Centre's Randy Palivoda Public Service Award. The following year, he received the Interfaith Advocate Award from the Edmonton Interfaith Centre for Education and Action for his work in promoting interfaith dialogue. Sohi was also awarded the Man of Honour, Exemplary Leadership Award from the Centre to End All Sexual Exploitation in recognition of his work to end gender discrimination and violence and the Edmonton Mennonite Centre for Newcomers Recognizing Immigrant Success in Edmonton (RISE) Lifetime Achievement award in 2015.

== Federal politics ==
In January 2015, Sohi was approached by the federal Liberal Party to run as a Member of Parliament in the newly created riding of Edmonton Mill Woods. He felt the need to bring up his imprisonment before it could be used against him politically, and thus contacted the Edmonton Journal reporter Paula Simons, who agreed to help report the story. He was acclaimed as a candidate the next month, and officially launched his campaign in June 2015 at a large rally with Liberal leader Justin Trudeau in Mill Woods. Sohi's campaign emphasized the importance of federal leadership to address big-city and infrastructure challenges. Sohi was also sharply critical of the Harper government's approach to citizenship, multiculturalism, and immigration policy.

The nomination contest in Edmonton Mill Woods was the subject of a minor controversy prior to Sohi's acclamation. Varinder Bhullar was disqualified following alleged violations of Liberal Party membership rules. Bhullar claimed the party disqualified him after he refused to step aside in favor of Sohi, the party's preferred candidate.

On October 19, 2015, after a longer than average 78-day federal election campaign, Sohi was declared elected as MP for Edmonton Mill Woods. Per the initial count, Sohi received 41.2% of the popular vote and won by a margin of 79 votes. Conservative candidate Tim Uppal successfully argued for a judicial recount of the results. The recount was held on October 29 and increased Sohi's margin of victory to 92 votes. After being elected as MP, Sohi was criticized for accepting a CA$46,000 severance package from the City of Edmonton. He defended the move, saying that he did not determine the amount, which was based on his years of service with Edmonton City Council.

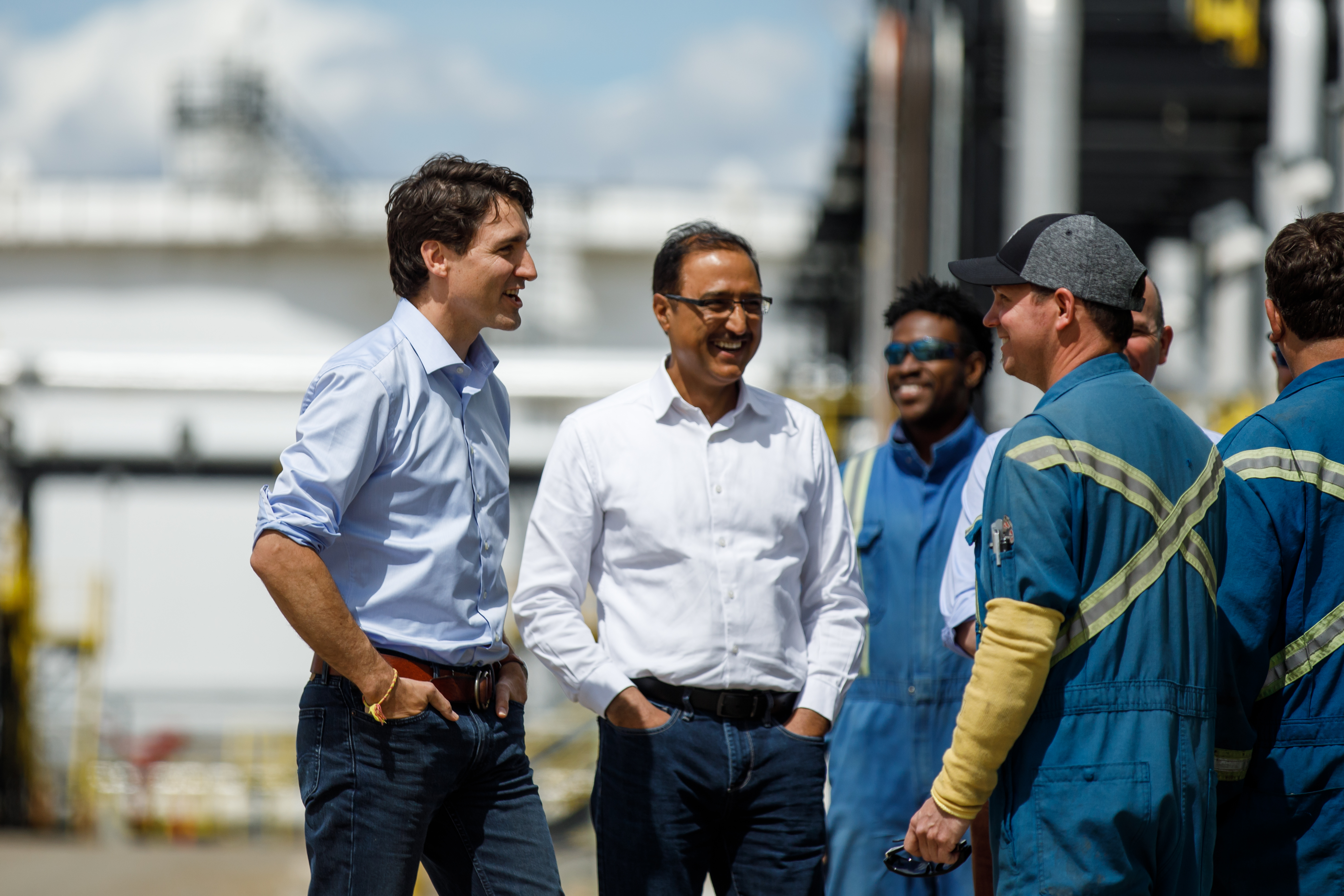
Sohi and Prime Minister Justin Trudeau (left) in 2018

=== Minister of Infrastructure and Communities ===
Sohi took on the Infrastructure and Communities portfolio in Justin Trudeau's first Cabinet on November 4, 2015.

=== Minister of Natural Resources ===
Sohi took over the Natural Resources profile from Jim Carr on July 18, 2018.

In the 2019 election, Sohi was defeated by Tim Uppal.

== Mayor of Edmonton ==
In May 2021, Sohi announced his candidacy for mayor of Edmonton in the 2021 Edmonton municipal election. Sohi was elected as Edmonton's 36th mayor on October 18, 2021, becoming the first visible minority to serve as mayor.

During Sohi's tenure, he raised property taxes, tackled a structural deficit, changed existing zoning bylaws, and invested in housing and public services.

=== Defamation case ===
In October 2024, it was announced that Sohi was suing three Alberta residents—Varinder Bhullar, Bob Rai, and Abdusselam Huzeyfe Bezirgan—for defamation, accusing them of spreading false claims about his involvement in corruption. Bezirgan, posing as a journalist, launched a video series in 2024 alleging that Sohi unlawfully used his political influence to benefit a relative in a Regina infrastructure project, with Rai as his source.

Bhullar is accused of sharing these videos and adding his own false statements. Sohi claims these accusations led to threats, vandalism, and attacks on his home. He is seeking $750,000 in damages, with any awarded funds going to support efforts against disinformation and to empower underrepresented communities. The defendants deny collaboration and have been given 20 days to file their defence.

== Electoral record ==
2025 Canadian federal election: Edmonton Southeast
Party	Candidate	Votes	%	±%	Expenditures
Conservative	Jagsharan Singh Mahal	25,206	52.88	+15.18	$99,104.56
Liberal	Amarjeet Sohi	18,481	38.77	+4.77	none listed
New Democratic	Harpreet Grewal	2,536	5.32	–17.00	$10,271.96
People's	Martin Schuetza	881	1.85	–3.83	none listed
Independent	Gurleen Chandi	292	0.61	–	none listed
Communist	Corinne Benson	268	0.56	+0.29	none listed
Total valid votes/expense limit		47,664	99.06	–	$123,761.55
Total rejected ballots		452	0.94	+0.61	
Turnout		48,116	66.56	+4.73	
Eligible voters		72,286			
Conservative gain from Liberal		Swing		+9.98	
Source: Elections Canada

2021 Edmonton mayoral election
Candidate	Vote	%
Amarjeet Sohi	105,497	45.09
Mike Nickel	59,189	25.30
Kim Krushell	40,337	17.24
Michael Oshry	14,469	6.18
Cheryll Watson	6,780	2.90%
Rick Comrie

2019 Canadian federal election: Edmonton Mill Woods
Party	Candidate	Votes	%	±%	Expenditures
Conservative	Tim Uppal	26,736	50.28	+9.22	$85,333.68
Liberal	Amarjeet Sohi	17,879	33.62	–7.62	$102,341.07
New Democratic	Nigel Logan	6,422	12.08	–0.70	$6,657.04
Green	Tanya Herbert	968	1.82	–0.39	none listed
People's	Annie Young	953	1.79	–	$393.75
Christian Heritage	Don Melanson	219	0.41	–0.17	$2,626.06
Total valid votes/expense limit		53,177	99.36	–	$106,439.35
Total rejected ballots		342	0.64	+0.18	
Turnout		53,519	68.09	+1.45	
Eligible voters		78,601			
Conservative gain from Liberal		Swing		+8.42	
Source: Elections Canada

2015 Canadian federal election: Edmonton Mill Woods
Party	Candidate	Votes	%	±%	Expenditures
Liberal	Amarjeet Sohi	20,423	41.24	+29.52	$136,379.94
Conservative	Tim Uppal	20,331	41.06	–17.88	$123,071.17
New Democratic	Jasvir Deol	6,330	12.78	–12.61	$55,302.53
Green	Ralph McLean	1,096	2.21	–0.78	$1,671.63
Independent	Colin Stubbs	560	1.13	–	$5,091.44
Libertarian	Allen K.W. Paley	396	0.80	–	$2,910.11
Christian Heritage	Peter Downing	285	0.58	–	$3,798.53
Communist	Naomi Rankin	96	0.19	–	none listed
Total valid votes/expense limit		49,517	99.54	–	$206,234.63
Total rejected ballots		227	0.46	–	
Turnout		49,744	66.64	–	
Eligible voters		74,651			
Liberal gain from Conservative		Swing		+23.70	
These results were subject to a judicial recount, and modified from the validated results in accordance with the Judge's rulings. The margin of Sohi over Uppal increased from 79 votes to 92 votes as a result of the recount.
Source: Elections Canada

29th Canadian Ministry (2015–2025) – Cabinet of Justin Trudeau
Cabinet posts (2)
Predecessor	Office	Successor
Jim Carr	Minister of Natural Resources; July 18, 2018 – November 20, 2019	Seamus O'Regan
Ministry Created	Minister of Infrastructure and Communities; November 4, 2015 – July 18, 2018	François-Philippe Champagne
