= Bear Paw Inn =

Bar and restaurant in Portland, Oregon, U.S.

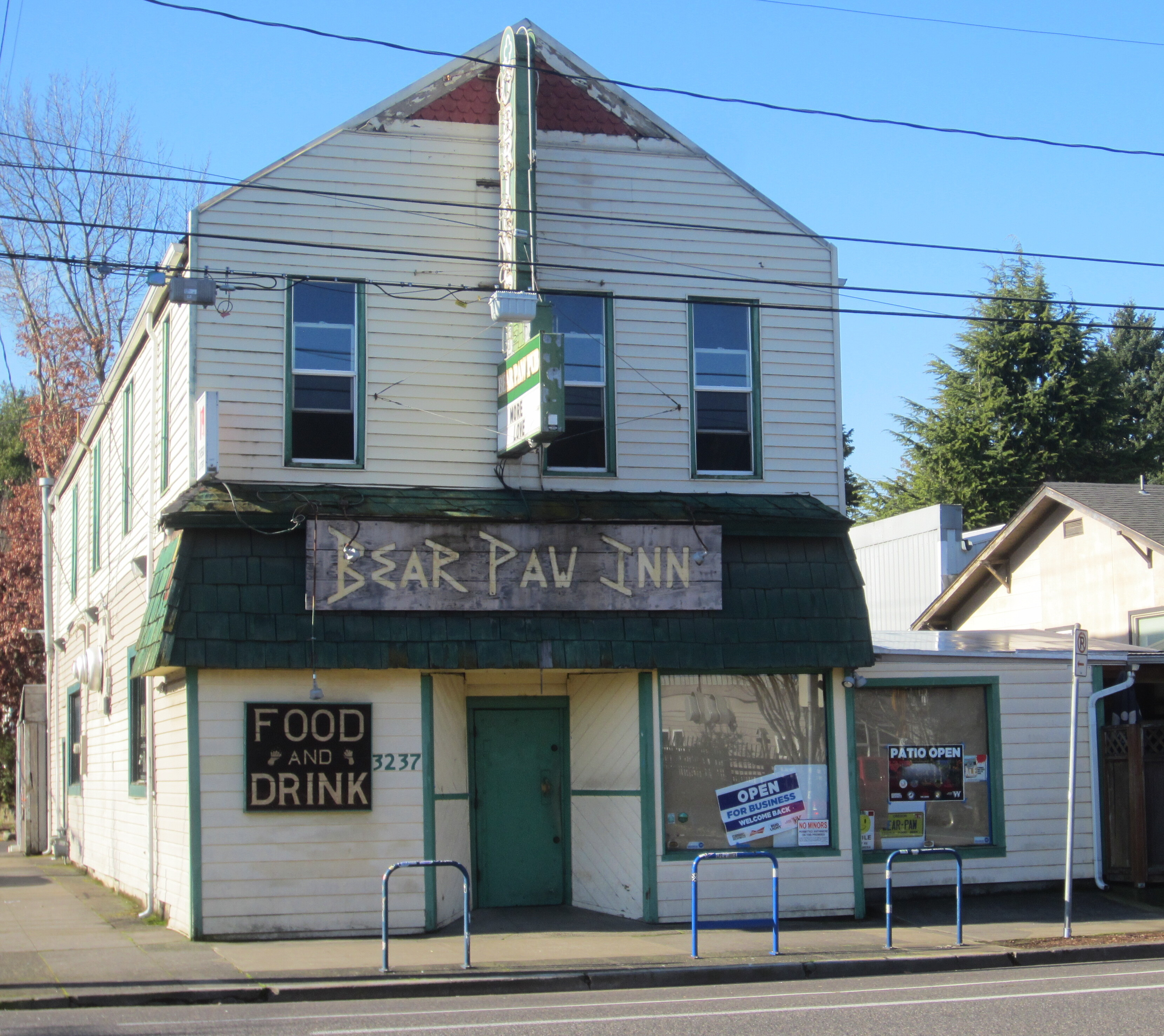
- The bar's exterior in 2021
- Interactive map of Bear Paw Inn

Restaurant information
- Owner: Nathan Dewey
- Location: Portland, Oregon, United States
- Coordinates: 45.4998°N 122.6545°W

The Bear Paw Inn is a bar and restaurant in Portland, Oregon, United States.

== Description and history ==
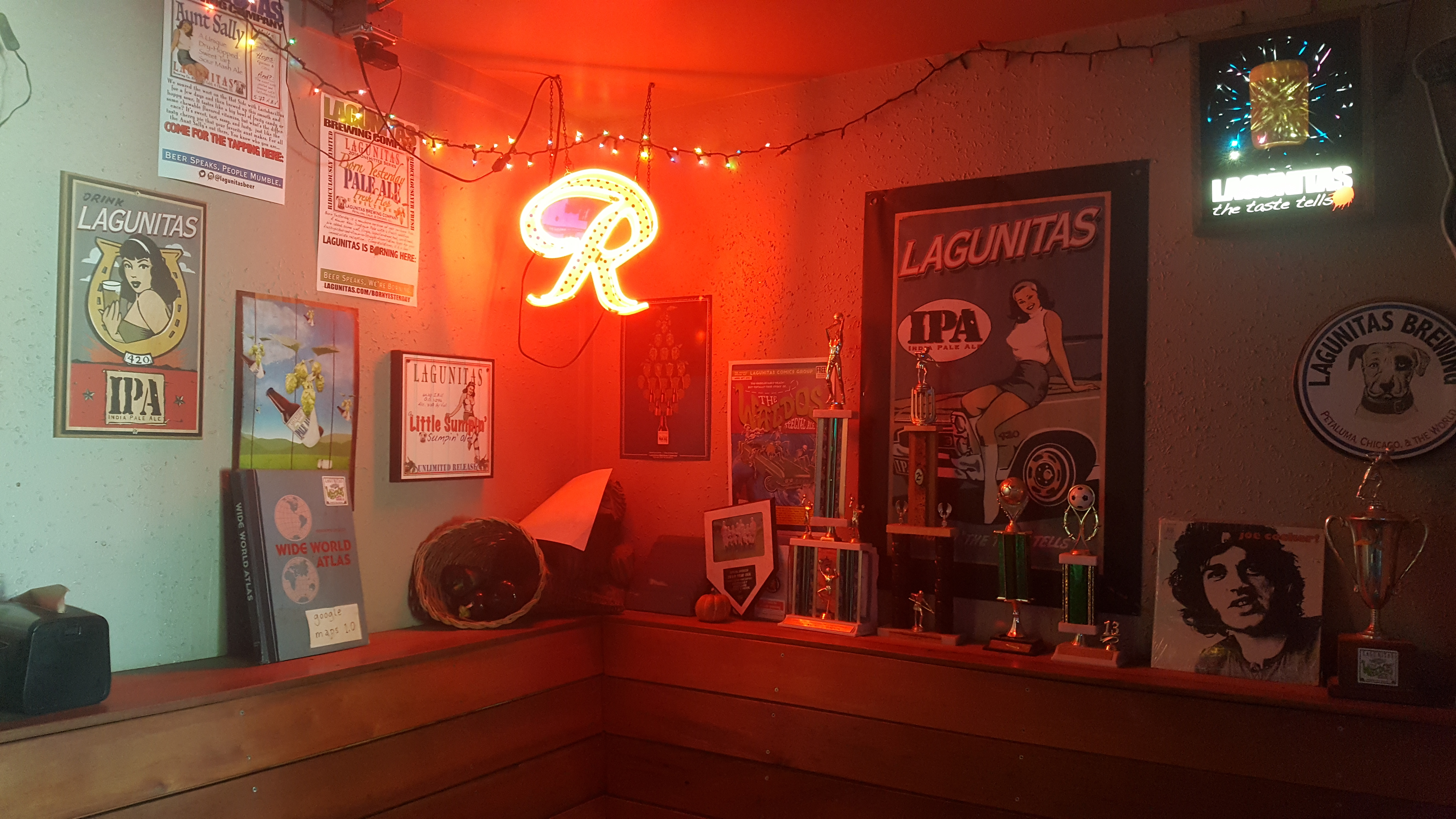
Interior decor, 2022

Owned by Nathan Dewey, the Bear Paw Inn is located in southeast Portland's Brooklyn neighborhood.

An armed robbery occurred at the bar in 2020. Jerry's Pizza began operating out of the bar in 2021.

== Reception ==
In 2000, the Portland Mercury said, "Some nights this place is a ragged party. I've seen skinny, drunk women stand on chairs and preach the virtues of wearing men's underwear, and swaying dancers outfitted in the shine of halos meant to protect a broken neck. During the day it's a meditative spot; drinkers line the bar quietly sipping. Decorations range from the glory of darts trophies to beer signs, an old suit of armor, a wide angle mirror in the women'sbathroom, and an Escher-esque piece of computer generated art on five feet of glass. If they offer food, I wouldn't eat it." The newspaper included the bar in a 2018 list of the city's best 13 places for karaoke.
