= Stumptown Coffee Roasters =

American coffee roasting company

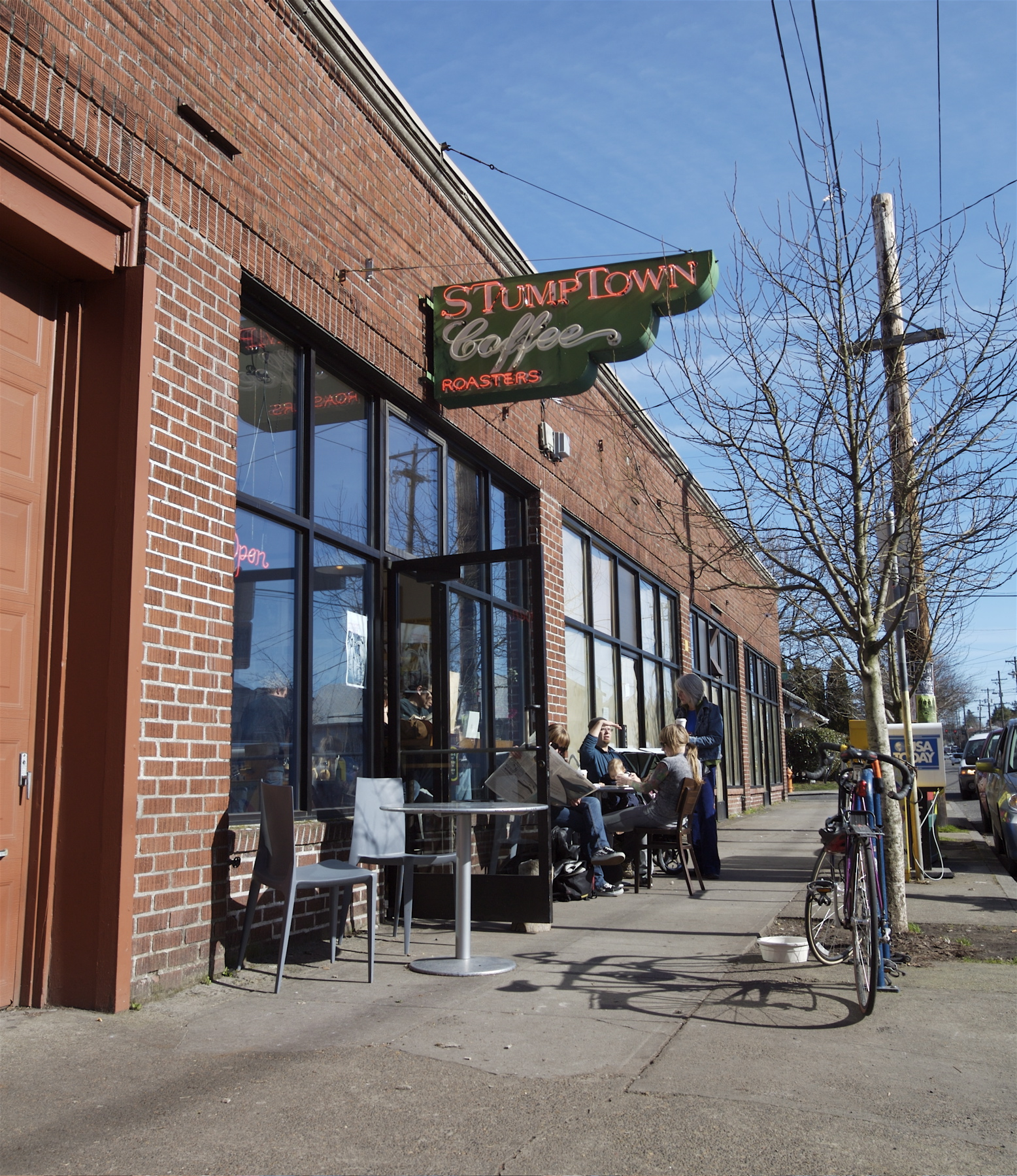
- The original Stumptown Coffee Roasters location in Portland, Oregon (February 2008)
- Company type: Subsidiary
- Industry: Coffee
- Founded: 1999
- Founder: Duane Sorenson
- Headquarters: Portland, Oregon
- Products: Coffee
- Owner: Keurig Dr Pepper
- Number of employees: 220 (2024)
- Parent: JDE Peet's (2015–2025); Keurig Dr Pepper (2025-present)
- Website: www.stumptowncoffee.com

Stumptown Coffee Roasters is a coffee roaster and retailer based in Portland, Oregon, United States. The chain's first location opened in 1999. Three other cafes, a roastery and a tasting annex have since opened in Portland, as well as locations in Seattle, New York, and Pasadena. Stumptown is owned by Peet's Coffee, which in turn is owned by Keurig Dr Pepper. The company was an early innovator with cold brew coffee in nitro cans and have continued to develop other cold brew product innovations.

== History ==
Founder Duane Sorenson and Stumptown Coffee Roasters have been labeled as part of the third wave of coffee movement. Sorenson and his employees visited coffee farms in person and reportedly paid high prices for beans, occasionally three or four times the fair trade price. He once set the record for highest price ever paid for coffee beans.

Sorenson also offered atypical perks to his employees such as paying for a compilation album to be produced of their various bands, and hiring a full-time on-staff massage therapist. Stumptown received the Roaster of the Year 2006, an award from a technical trade magazine called Roast Magazine

In January 2014, the company began selling coffee, pre-mixed with milk, in grocery stores. In 2015, Stumptown Coffee Roasters was bought by Peet's Coffee for an undisclosed amount.

=== Locations ===
Stumptown operates five cafes in Portland. They are located on SE 45th & Division St., SE 34th & Belmont, downtown at SW 3rd & Ash St., inside the Ace Hotel at 1022 SW Stark Street, and at the Portland International Airport. The company also owns a roasting facility and a retail annex inside their headquarters at 100 SE Salmon St. The original location on SE Division was previously a hair salon called "The Hair Bender," whose name Stumptown adopted for one of their signature espresso blends.

In November 2007, Stumptown opened two cafes in Seattle. In September 2009, the company also launched a cafe in New York's Ace Hotel. A temporary "pop-up" location appeared in Amsterdam's De Pijp neighborhood in May 2010. Opened by Sorenson, he claimed it was never intended to be permanent and closed its doors that same year.

In 2013, Stumptown opened a second New York City café and a café/roaster in Los Angeles. Additional cafes have also opened in Chicago and New Orleans. Stumptown opened their third New York cafe in a historic Brooklyn firehouse in the summer of 2018. A location at the Portland International Airport opened in 2024.

== Reception ==
Stumptown won in the Best Coffee (Locally Roasted) category of Willamette Week's annual 'Best of Portland' readers' poll in 2006. It was a runner-up in the Best Coffee Shop category in 2017 and won in the Best Coffee Roaster category in 2018. Stumptown was a runner-up and ranked second in the Best Coffee category in 2020 and 2022, respectively. It was a finalist in the same category in 2025.

== See also ==
- List of coffee companies
- List of coffeehouse chains
