= Ava Gene's =

Italian restaurant in Portland, Oregon, U.S.

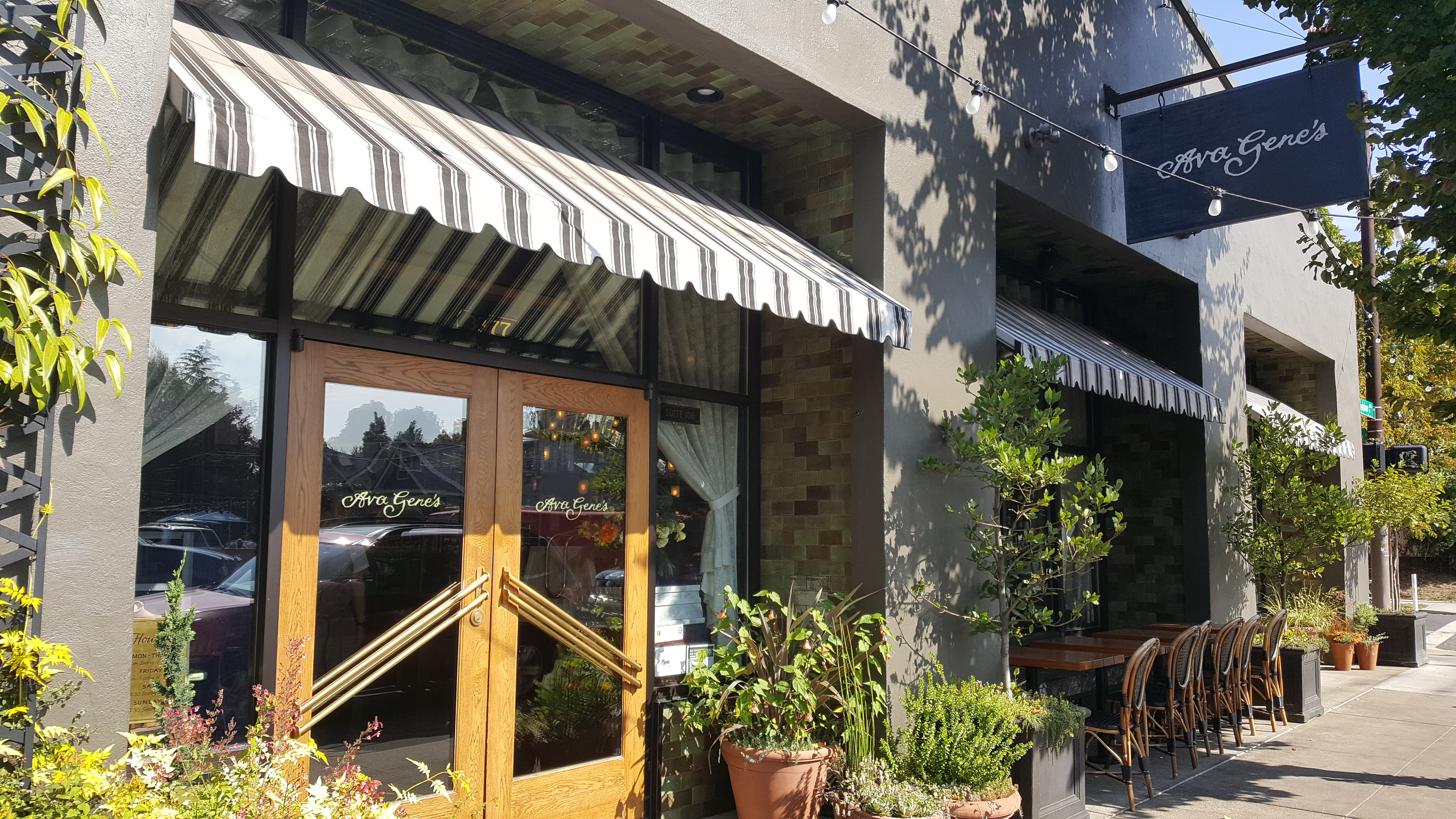
- The restaurant's exterior in 2016
- Interactive map of Ava Gene's

Restaurant information
- Established: 2012
- Owner: Joshua McFadden
- Food type: Italian
- Location: 3377 Southeast Division Street, Portland, Multnomah, Oregon, 97202, United States
- Coordinates: 45.5049°N 122.6297°W
- Website: avagenes.com

Ava Gene's is an Italian restaurant in southeast Portland's Richmond neighborhood, in the United States.

During the COVID-19 pandemic, the restaurant was temporarily converted into the marketplace Shipshape Goods.

== Description ==
Ava Gene's primarily serves Italian cuisine.

== History ==
Ava Gene's was established in 2012. In 2020, during the COVID-19 pandemic, the restaurant was converted into temporary marketplace with a walk-up window called Shipshape Goods. The restaurant closed during the pandemic, reopening in 2023, after being purchased by Sortis Holdings. The business participated in Portland Dining Month in 2026.

== Reception ==
Ava Gene's was included in Eater Portland's 2025 list of the city's best Italian restaurants. Michael Russell ranked Ava Gene's number 35 in The Oregonian's 2025 list of Portland's 40 best restaurants. The business was included in Portland Monthly's 2025 list of 25 restaurants "that made Portland".

== See also ==
- Cicoria (restaurant), defunct sibling establishment
- List of Italian restaurants
