= Knowmadic =

Somali-Canadian poet

Ahmed Ali
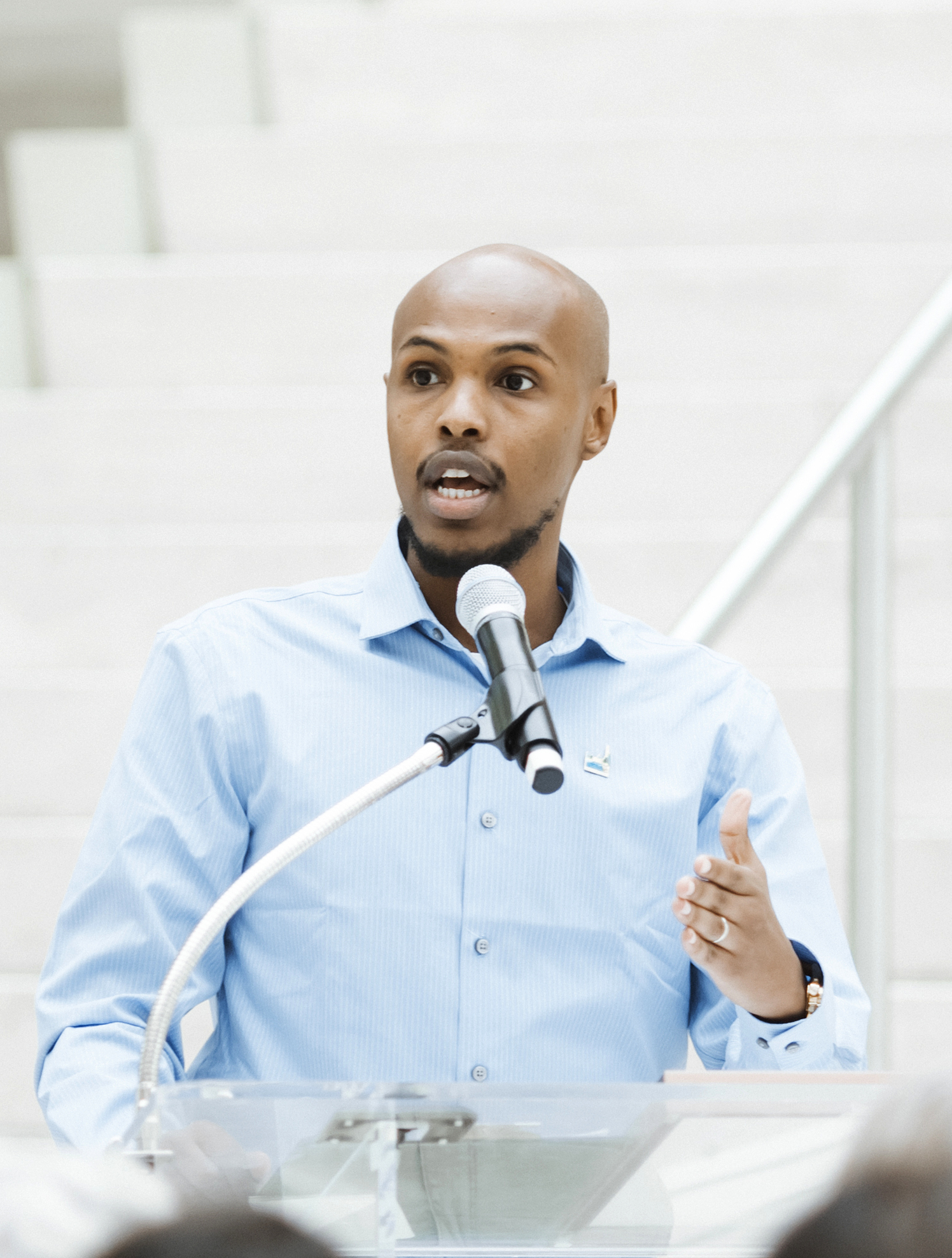
- Born: November 28, 1984 (age 41); Mogadishu, Somalia
- Occupations: Poet; actor; musician; activist; politician
- Known for: Poet Laureate of Edmonton
- Website: www.ahmedknowmadic.com

Ahmed Ali, better known by the pseudonym Knowmadic, is a Somali-Canadian poet, writer, actor, musician, and youth activist.

== Early life ==
Ali was born November 28, 1984, in Mogadishu, to a nomadic father and a mother whose family were farmers. His name is a portmanteau of knowledge and nomadic. His family immigrated first to Italy in 1989, then to Canada. While in Italy, Ali and his 3 older brothers stayed in boarding schools. Upon graduating, he attended Humber College in Toronto, Ontario for Comedy writing and performance. Ali was introduced to spoken word in 2009 by Titilope Sonuga, who curated a regular poetry night called Rouge Poetry; She invited Ali and others to help her found the Breath in Poetry Collective.

== Career ==
In 2011, Ali and team Edmonton won the Canadian Festival of Spoken Word championship. In 2013, Ali received an opportunity to be Artist in residence at the Langston Hughes Performing Arts Center in Seattle, Washington, initiating his career as a full-time artist. In 2017, he was runner-up for public school board trustee in Ward A in Edmonton. In January 2018, Ali hosted the APAP Annual Awards Ceremony, honoring Martin Luther King. He served a two-year term as Edmonton's Poet Laureate, from July 1, 2017, to June 30, 2019, as its seventh Poet Laureate.

Ali sits on community boards including the Edmonton Arts Council where he chairs the equity committee. He also performs speaking engagements at local schools, and has participated in vigils against violence.

Ali is married and has two daughters.

== Awards and nominations ==
- Edmonton Artists’ Trust Fund Award
- Top 30 Under 30
- Cultural Diversity in the Arts Awards
- Canadian Champion of Spoken word
- Top 40 Under 40
- Human Rights Champions Award
- Michaëlle Jean Young Arts Entrepreneur Award

== Art Residencies ==
- Langston Hughes Performing Arts Center
- Edmonton Mennonite Centre for Newcomers.
