= Thomas Dang =

Canadian politician

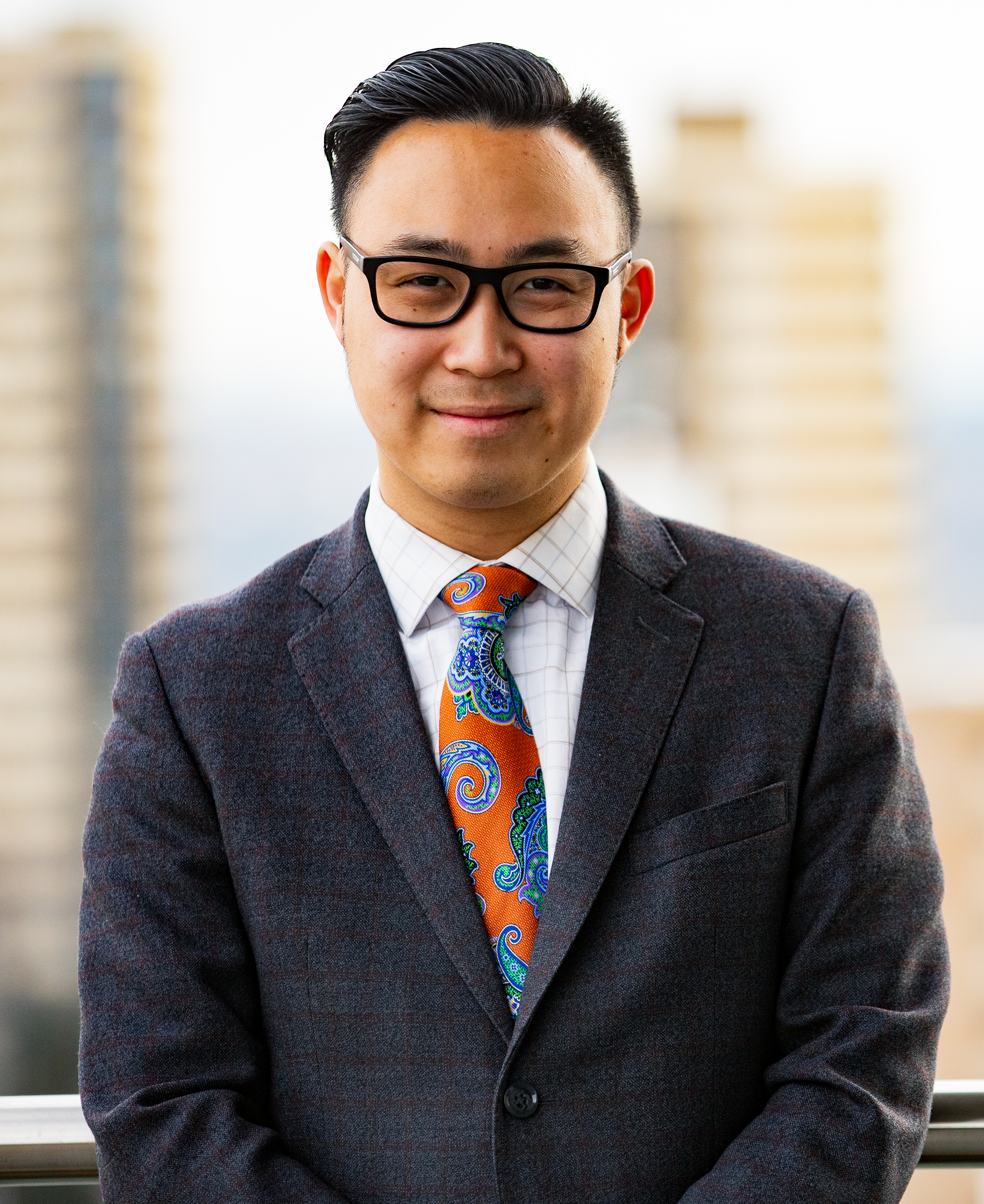
- Dang in 2018

Alberta NDP Deputy House Leader
- In office February 8, 2021 – December 21, 2021
- Leader: Rachel Notley
- Preceded by: Christina Gray

Alberta NDP Infrastructure Critic
- In office April 2019 – December 21, 2021
- Leader: Rachel Notley

Alberta NDP Democracy and Ethics Critic
- In office October 2021 – December 21, 2021
- Leader: Rachel Notley
- Preceded by: Heather Sweet

Member of the Legislative Assembly of Alberta for Edmonton-South
- In office April 16, 2019 – May 29, 2023
- Preceded by: District recreated last held by Herbert Crawford (1913–1921)
- Succeeded by: Rhiannon Hoyle

Member of the Legislative Assembly of Alberta for Edmonton-South West
- In office May 5, 2015 – April 16, 2019
- Preceded by: Matt Jeneroux
- Succeeded by: Kaycee Madu

Personal details
- Born: April 7, 1995 (age 31) Edmonton, Alberta
- Party: Alberta NDP (2015–2021) Independent (2021–2023) Yukon NDP (2024–present)
- Other political affiliations: Alberta New Democratic Party (until 2021)
- Occupation: Politician, information security architect
- Website: thomasdang.ca

Thomas Kyle Dang (born April 7, 1995) is a former Canadian politician who was elected in the 2015 Alberta general election to the Legislative Assembly of Alberta representing the electoral district of Edmonton-South West. Dang is the youngest MLA to ever be elected in Alberta. He later sat as an independent MLA.

Dang was a member of the first Alberta NDP Government Caucus in the province's history. During his first term, Dang advocated heavily for the new South-West high school and hospital, both of which were announced during his tenure. He also put forward motions related to education and notably, changes to daylight saving time in Alberta.

In April 2019, Thomas Dang was re-elected to the Legislative Assembly of Alberta in the new electoral district of Edmonton-South, defeating the United Conservative Party candidate Tunde Obasan by a narrow margin. On December 21, 2021, Dang resigned from the NDP caucus after an RCMP search of his home. The search was later linked to a hack on the Alberta government vaccine information website, which, according to Dang, he conducted to highlight security flaws in the site. The Alberta Government eventually introduced a public vulnerability disclosure program for cybersecurity. Ultimately, Dang pled guilty and was fined $7,200 in November 2022.

As of 2026, he is Manager of Network and Information Security for the Government of Yukon. He speaks at various Cyber Security Conferences about his experience. As of 2024, he is the Authorized Financial Agent for the Yukon New Democratic Party.

== Early life and education ==
Dang was born and raised in Edmonton, Alberta. He is the second child of ethnic Chinese parents, who were refugees from Vietnam.

=== Education ===
Before entering politics, Dang was pursuing a degree in Computing Science at the University of Alberta. In 2022, he completed a Bachelor of Science in Cybersecurity and Information Assurance from Western Governors University. He has also completed a University Certificate in Computing and Information Systems from Athabasca University. Dang has previously worked as a software consultant and software developer.

As of 2026, Dang was pursuing a Master of Science in Cybersecurity at New York University's Tandon School of Engineering as a Cyber Fellow.

== Political career ==
Dang entered politics as a candidate for the New Democratic Party of Alberta. He served as a member of the Standing Committee on the Alberta Heritage Savings Trust Fund, the Special Standing Committee on Members' Services and the Standing Committee on Resource Stewardship. He also previously served as a member of the Standing Committee on Private Bills.

In December 2020, Dang was named as Alberta's Best Representative of Constituents by his legislature colleagues.

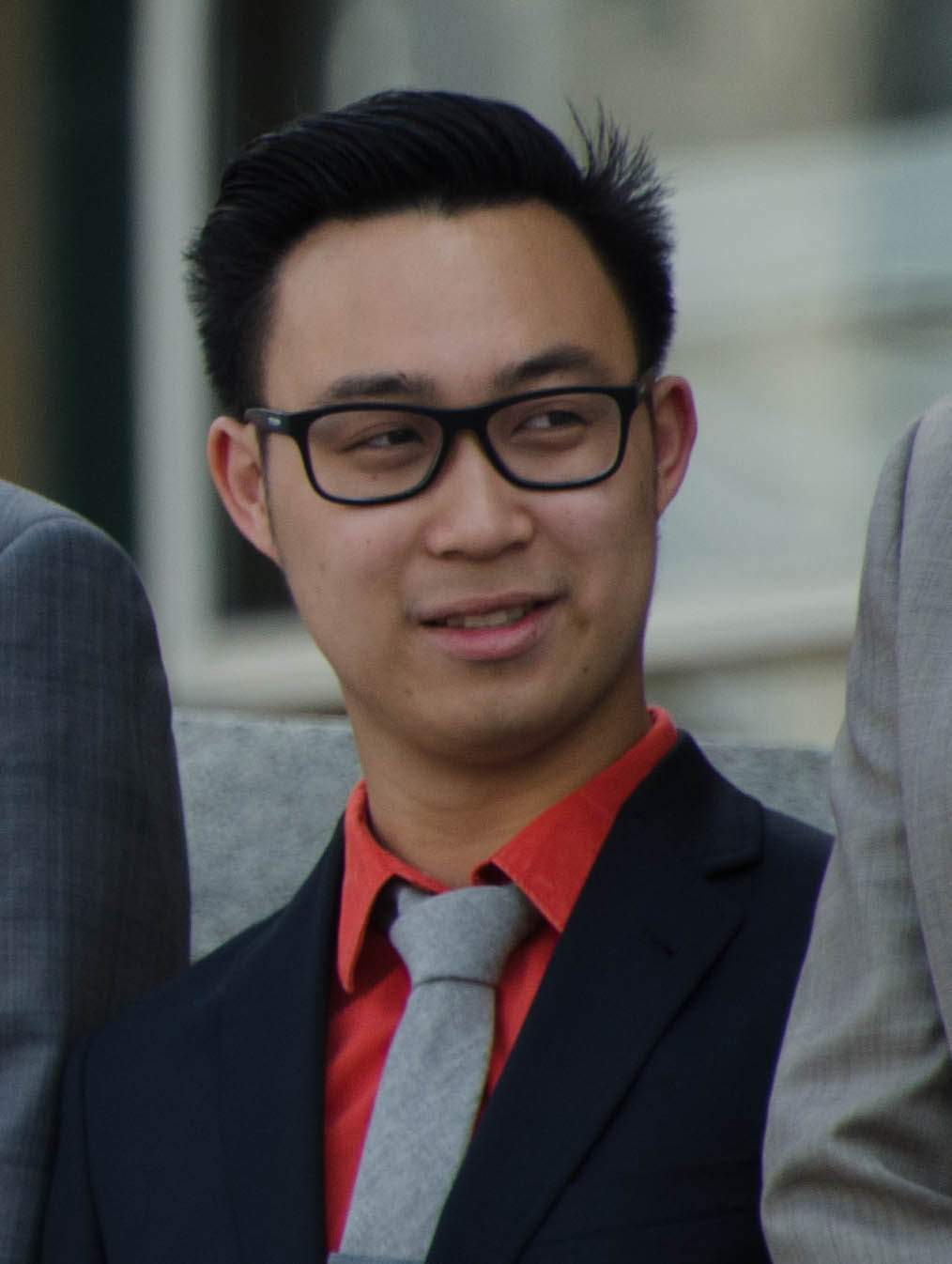
Dang in 2015

=== Early career ===
Dang was a computer science student at the University of Alberta. He also wrote a blog on provincial politics. He defeated incumbent Progressive Conservative MLA Matt Jeneroux in the May 5, 2015 election that saw the Alberta NDP sweep the city of Edmonton and win a majority government, the first switch of governing parties in the province since the 1971 election. As of 2014–2015, he is a member of the Delta Upsilon fraternity at the University of Alberta.

=== Official Opposition ===
In his second term, Dang served as the Official Opposition Infrastructure Critic and as Democracy and Ethics Critic. In February 2021, he was appointed Official Opposition Deputy House Leader.

During his time in opposition, he was a vocal critic against misuse of funds and brought forward motions to investigate spending scandals and errors of Government MLAs.

==== Democracy and Ethics Critic ====
Dang opposed a motion that granted UCP MLA Joseph Schow a $12,000 raise in October 2021. He called the move to increase a politicians' pay "absurd" and "hypocritical" while the Government is asking front-line and public sector workers for a wage rollback.

In November 2021, Dang sent a letter to Elections Alberta requesting an independent review of the use of third-party money to purchase tickets to the United Conservative Party annual general meeting.

==== Infrastructure Critic ====
===== Hospitals =====
In May 2017, the Alberta Government announced a new hospital in southwest Edmonton. The location was chosen in part due to its proximity to both Anthony Henday Drive and the Queen Elizabeth Highway 2 (Alberta). The location is also near a proposed future LRT expansion. This decision was in part due to advocacy by Dang and he was on hand for the announcement.

Dang was critical of the UCP Government for not fully funding the proposed Red Deer Hospital.

===== Schools =====
In November 2017, Premier Rachel Notley and Education Minister David Eggen, alongside Dang, announced the construction of a new high school for the southwest region of Edmonton, the city's first new high school in over 12 years. The new high school, with space for 1,800 students, was announced in response to the dramatic growth in that part of the city. Dang had been advocating for the school for several years.

Dang also advocated for parents and students experiencing issues with the public–private partnership schools built in the Edmonton area. The schools have experienced issues with drainage issues leading to mud pits and large fences installed by the contractor. Dang has asked questions in Question Period of both the Education Minister and Infrastructure Minister and received commitments from the Government to work on resolving the issue.

While in opposition as infrastructure critic, he pushed against Government plans to increase the use of P3 projects.

==== Earplug controversy ====
During a late-night sitting of the Alberta Legislature, Premier Jason Kenney handed out earplugs to members of the United Conservative Party caucus while Dang was speaking. While the Kenney's press secretary called the move "a harmless and light-hearted attempt to boost government caucus morale", the Alberta Federation of Labour deemed it "outrageous and insulting".

=== Community advocacy ===
==== Racism and refugees ====
Throughout his political career, Dang has been an advocate on refugee and anti-racism issues. His parents were Chinese-Vietnamese refugees from Vietnam. He has spoken out against racism in politics in the Legislature and supported Vietnamese people who came to Alberta as refugees. Dang has criticized Jason Kenney for comparing his own emigration from Saskatchewan to refugee Canadians.

On March 22, Dang introduced a motion calling on the UCP government to ban "racist symbols and insignia" in public spaces as well as at demonstrations "meant to terrorize and promote racism". However, Dang accused the UCP government of using a debate on rodeo to run out the clock to avoid debate on his motion. Rallies had occurred across Alberta where some protestors carried tiki torches, widely considered a symbol of white supremacy. At least five Edmonton Muslim women and multiple Calgarians had been targeted in recent months.

===== Parody account =====
Dang was also the subject of a racist parody account linking him to North Korean dictator Kim Jong-un which was followed by multiple high-ranking UCP government staffers including Matt Wolf, Premier Jason Kenney's Executive Director of Issues Management. Dang stated that it was disappointing that while UCP MLAs were voting for his anti-racism motion, so many UCP staffers would be enjoying this racist content. The parody account was suspended by Twitter as of April 14, 2021.

==== Youth and bullying ====
Dang put forward Motion 503 in his first session as an MLA, urging the Government to consult with school boards and youth to encourage student participation on boards. This was aimed at increasing dialogue and student engagement on democratic governance. The motion was passed unanimously with bi-partisan support in the assembly. The motion read as follows:

Be it resolved that the Legislative Assembly urge the Government to consult with school boards and youth to encourage senior high school student participation on boards with a view to increasing dialogue, increasing student engagement in board policy and planning, and educating students about democratic governance.

Notice of Motion 507 was given on Day 2 of the second session on the order paper. This motion was aimed at ensuring that students and parents were ready to deal with all facets of bullying in an ever-evolving technological world. The notice of motion reads as follows:

Be it resolved that the Legislative Assembly urge the Government to take steps to increase awareness in Alberta's schools of the effects of cyberbullying.

Motion 507 was passed unanimously with bi-partisan support in the assembly.

==== Tourism week ====
In spring 2016, Dang tabled Bill 204, The Alberta Tourism Week Act. This bill would create a tourism week in legislation that would occur in the first week of June starting in 2017. The Bill has currently passed first and second reading in the Legislature.

==== Daylight saving time ====
In late 2016, Dang announced that he planned to table a bill to end seasonal clock changes in Alberta. Dang said he had been working on this file since it had been brought up at an NDP policy convention. He has stated that he intends to lead a public consultation on the issue in advance of his bill in 2017.

On February 13, 2017, Dang announced an online consultation process that would take place until the end of February. He received widespread support from young families and members of the agricultural industry. Egg farmers have cheered the proposal, because the time change “plays havoc with the natural rhythm of poultry.” Dang also announced that he hoped to have a bill ready to be tabled in mid-March.

Dang tabled Bill 203, the Alberta Standard Time Act on March 14, 2017. The bill would set the Alberta Standard Time to UTC−6. This was done after his online consultation showed that 82% of respondents prefer not changing their clocks twice a year, and 59% of respondents prefer to have daylight in the late afternoon.

In October 2017, the Alberta Legislature voted against Dang's bill to abolish the time change. This was due in part to pressure from industry groups such as the Oilers Entertainment Group and WestJet. The industries were concerned about the consequences of moving off time change while other jurisdictions continued to. Dang said that despite the vote he would like to continue the conversation and would support moving forward if other jurisdictions such as British Columbia and other parts of North America abolished time change as well.

The goal of Dang's proposal was eventually adopted in 2026, when Alberta announced that it would retain daylight saving time year-round, ending seasonal clock changes.

=== COVID-19 ===
Dang has been an advocate throughout the COVID-19 pandemic in Alberta for more support for small businesses and families.

In October 2021, Dang called on Premier Jason Kenney to make vaccinations mandatory for all United Conservative MLAs and to remove any members who were unvaccinated from his caucus. Dang stated that it is imperative political leaders set the right example and get vaccinated. He introduced a motion that was ultimately unsuccessful in requiring proof of vaccination.

=== Resignation from NDP caucus and vaccine information hack ===
On December 21, 2021, Dang resigned from the Alberta NDP caucus after an RCMP search of his home. According to Notley, Dang offered his resignation as part of a "long-standing policy that members under active police investigation will not sit in the caucus". Dang responded to the search, saying it was related to "the vulnerabilities with the COVID-19 vaccination records on the Government of Alberta website", which he had investigated and disclosed to Alberta Health. The Alberta government website had been released in September 2021, and allowed Alberta residents to access their COVID-19 vaccination information by entering their health card number, birthday and month they were vaccinated.

In March 2022, Dang admitted to hacking the system, saying he had done so to highlight security vulnerabilities and pass on the information to the government. He described the hack as "well within the skill set of an amateur." In a white paper released on his website, Dang detailed his process, which first involved a fuzzing test. Dang then bypassed an IP address block by using a script that connected to the Tor network, which anonymized his connection. He then set out to test the vulnerability by entering Alberta premier Jason Kenney's birthdate and date of vaccination, which Dang later defended by saying the information was publicly available. His script was then able to guess a random health card number and retrieve a record belonging to an unknown individual. According to Dang, he then "immediately exited the website and did not save any information". After the hack, Dang contacted the NDP caucus, and the information was passed onto Alberta Health, with the vulnerability being fixed within weeks. Dang and the NDP's actions were criticized by UCP MLA and government whip Brad Rutherford, who said the party's "first instinct was to protect him, instead of being forthright with Albertans".

In his white paper, Dang also criticized the Alberta government's lack of "basic" cybersecurity measures and called for the creation of an office dedicated to cyberdefence, along with a vulnerability disclosure program that encourages and rewards security researchers. The paper was later removed from his website.

In June 2022, the Alberta RCMP Cybercrime Investigative Team announced that Dang was charged with "illegally attempting to access private information contained in the Alberta Health vaccine portal" under the Alberta Health Information Act, a non-criminal charge that could result in a fine of up to $200,000. Unsealed court documents later showed that the RCMP were pursuing criminal charges against Dang at least until March 31, but later decided to charge him under the Health Information Act. The documents also said that the Alberta vaccine information portal received 1.78 million requests using Kenney's birthdate shortly after its launch, which it characterized as a "brute force attack" from Dang.

On November 4, 2022, Dang pleaded guilty to a Health Information Act charge of illegally attempting to access private information. On November 29, he was ordered to pay a fine of $7,200.

==== Response ====
Dang's decision to act alone also received criticism from NAIT cybersecurity chair John Zabiuk, who said that his actions were not consistent with those of an ethical hacker. However, other information security professionals like Brad Haines (better known as Renderman), have said that Dang's calls for improved cybersecurity oversight should be heard and that the RCMP response will likely have a chilling effect on ethical hackers. The methodology Dang used has been described as "common practice in the private sector" and experts have suggested Alberta should implement a bug bounty program without "[turning] a person's life upside down because he decided to become a whistleblower." Haines commented that he hoped "[we] will learn to thank someone like [Dang] rather than condemn him."

In June 2021, the Government of Alberta released their first annual cybersecurity update. This led to the "CyberAlberta" initiative which included a new public vulnerability disclosure program.

== Post-political career ==
Dang's talk at DEF CON 31, titled " The Risks of Pointing Out the Emperor is Buck Naked"

After leaving politics, Dang became an Information Security Architect for the Government of Yukon. In March 2026, he became Manager of Network and Information Security.

In August 2023, Dang and Haines gave a talk at the DEF CON 31 hacker convention in Las Vegas. His presentation included advocacy on improving vulnerability disclosure programs in governments and other public sector organizations.

Dang has also spoken at Security BSides events regarding his expertise and experience in Cyber Security and Network security.

== Personal life ==
Dang played competitive table tennis as a junior for many years, competing across Canada and in the United States of America. He was a member of the Edmonton Table Tennis Club.

He also enjoys playing Ingress, an alternate reality game that involves physically going to different locations as part of the gameplay, with Dang stating that his earlier game-related travels to different parts of Alberta have been helpful since becoming an MLA in the province.

== Electoral history ==
=== 2019 general election ===
2019 Alberta general election: Edmonton-South
Party	Candidate	Votes	%	±%
New Democratic	Thomas Dang	10,673	46.63	-7.06
United Conservative	Tunde Obasan	9,881	43.17	+3.20
Alberta Party	Pramod Kumar	2,156	9.42	+2.10
Green	Ben Roach	180	0.79	+0.71
Total		22,890	99.10	–
Rejected, spoiled and declined		208	0.90	
Turnout		23,098	70.84	
Eligible electors		32,607		
New Democratic hold		Swing		-5.13
Source(s) Source: "42 - Edmonton-South, 2019 Alberta general election". officialresults.elections.ab.ca. Elections Alberta. Alberta. Chief Electoral Officer (2019). 2019 General Election. A Report of the Chief Electoral Officer. Volume II (PDF) (Report). Vol. 2. Edmonton, Alta.: Elections Alberta. pp. 164–167. ISBN 978-1-988620-12-1.

=== 2015 general election ===
2015 Alberta general election: Edmonton-South West
Party	Candidate	Votes	%	±%
New Democratic	Thomas Dang	12,352	54.41%	45.89%
Progressive Conservative	Matt Jeneroux	6,316	27.82%	-28.64%
Wildrose	Cole Kander	2,290	10.09%	-7.93%
Liberal	Rudy Arcilla	1,199	5.28%	-9.67%
Alberta Party	Krishna Tailor	543	2.39%	0.35%
Total		22,700	–	–
Rejected, spoiled and declined		81	35	21
Eligible electors / turnout		41,230	55.30%	3.99%
New Democratic gain from Progressive Conservative		Swing		-5.93%
Source(s) Source: "44 - Edmonton-South West, 2015 Alberta general election". officialresults.elections.ab.ca. Elections Alberta. Chief Electoral Officer (2016). 2015 General Election. A Report of the Chief Electoral Officer (PDF) (Report). Edmonton, Alta.: Elections Alberta.
