= The Power of the Powerless =

Political essay by Václav Havel

The Power of the Powerless: Citizens Against the State in Central-Eastern Europe
- Editor: John Keane
- Author: Václav Havel
- Translator: Paul Wilson
- Language: English
- Publisher: M. E. Sharpe
- Publication date: 1985
- ISBN: 978-0873327619

The Power of the Powerless (Czech: Moc bezmocných) is an expansive political essay written in October 1978 by the Czech dramatist, political dissident, and later statesman, Václav Havel.

The essay dissects the nature of communist regimes of the time, life within such a regime, and how by their very nature, such regimes can create dissidents of ordinary citizens. The essay goes on to discuss ideas and possible actions by loose communities of individuals linked by a common cause, such as human-rights petition Charter 77.

Officially suppressed, the essay was circulated in samizdat form and translated into multiple languages. It became a manifesto for dissidents in Czechoslovakia, Poland, and other communist states.

The essay was first translated into English by Paul Wilson and published by Ladislav Matejka and Benjamin Stolz in the University of Michigan Department of Slavic Languages and Literature's 1983 edition of Cross Currents. The essay appeared alongside a monologue written by Arthur Miller titled "I Think About You A Great Deal" to be performed at the Festival d'Avignon as an expression of solidarity with Havel.

In 1985 the essay was published as part of a volume of essays edited by John Keane, entitled The Power of the Powerless: Citizens Against the State in Central-Eastern Europe.

== Background and history ==
Under the communist regime in Czechoslovakia, there was an omnipresent pressure exerted by the political apparatus on culture. Various methods were used to pressure citizens into compliance. Havel's philosophical mentor, Jan Patočka, who was also the co-spokesman of the human-rights petition, Charter 77, died of a stroke in March 1977, after an 11-hour interrogation by the Czechoslovak secret police regarding his involvement in the Charter.

Havel wrote "The Power of the Powerless" in October 1978, originally meant to be the basis of a planned book of Polish and Czechoslovak essays on the nature of freedom. Each of the contributors of this planned book was to have received a copy of Havel's essay and then to respond to it.

After the launch of Charter 77, which coincided with the release of The Power of the Powerless, Havel was put under continuous pressure by the secret police; he was under constant government surveillance and they interrogated him almost daily. When he did not cave, Havel was imprisoned. He was arrested in May 1979—along with other members of the Committee for the Defense of the Unjustly Prosecuted (Výbor na obranu nespravedlivě stíhaných, or VONS), an organization that Havel co-founded that year—and he remained imprisoned until February 1983.

Following Havel's arrest, the individual Czechoslovak essays were decided to be 'published' separately and were distributed in samizdat form in 1979; as such, they were the only contributions to be released.

The essay was translated into English by Paul Wilson and published in 1985 as part of a volume of essays edited by John Keane, entitled The Power of the Powerless: Citizens Against the State in Central-Eastern Europe, which includes an introduction by Steven Lukes and contributions from various Soviet-era Eastern-European dissidents and intellectuals.

== Content ==
The topic of how best to resist a totalitarian system occupied Havel's mind after the launch of Charter 77. This became the crux of his essay, which was one of the most "original and compelling pieces of political writing" to come out of the Eastern Bloc, according to Havel biographer, John Keane. Dedicated to the memory of Jan Patočka, the opening section of the essay sought to explain what Charter 77 signified to those living within Czechoslovakia, and "to give courage" to fellow opponents of the Soviet bloc elsewhere.

=== Life in a "post-totalitarian" system ===
Havel coined the term "post-totalitarian" for this essay, writing, "I do not wish to imply by the prefix 'post-' that the system is no longer totalitarian; on the contrary, I mean that it is totalitarian in a way fundamentally different from classical dictatorships..."

Havel biographer, John Keane, describes Havel's definition of a post-totalitarian world:

Within the system, every individual is trapped within a dense network of the state's governing instruments… themselves legitimated by a flexible but comprehensive ideology, a 'secularized religion'…it is therefore necessary to see, argued Havel, that power relations…are best described as a labyrinth of influence, repression, fear and self-censorship which swallows up everyone within it, at the very least by rendering them silent, stultified and marked by some undesirable prejudices of the powerful…

=== Havel's greengrocer ===
Havel uses the example of a greengrocer who displays in his shop the sign Workers of the world, unite! Since failure to display the sign could be seen as disloyalty, he displays it and the sign becomes not a symbol of his enthusiasm for the regime, but a symbol of both his submission to it and humiliation by it. Havel returns repeatedly to this motif to show the contradictions between the "intentions of life" and the "intentions of systems", i.e. between the individual and the state, in a totalitarian society.

An individual living within such a system must live a lie, to hide that which he truly believes and desires, and to do that which he must do, to be left in peace and to survive. This is comparable to the classical tale of "The Emperor's New Clothes."

[T]hey must live within a lie. They need not accept the lie. It is enough for them to have accepted their life with it and in it. For by this very fact, individuals confirm the system, fulfill the system, make the system, are the system.

This essay reached us in the Ursus factory in 1979 at a point when we felt we were at the end of the road...we had been speaking on the shop floor, talking to people, participating in public meetings, trying to speak the truth about the factory, the country, and politics. There came a moment when people thought that we were crazy. Why were we doing this? Why were we taking such risks? Not seeing any immediate and tangible results, we began to doubt the purposefulness of what we were doing... Then came the essay by Havel. Reading it gave us the theoretical underpinnings for our activity. It maintained our spirits; we did not give up, and a year later — in August 1980 — it became clear that the party apparatus and the factory management were afraid of us. We mattered. And the rank and file saw us as leaders of the movement...

— Zbigniew Bujak, Solidarity activist, recalling the effect that Havel's essay had upon the leaders of Poland's nascent Solidarity movement

Individuals at each level within the bureaucracy must display their own equivalent of the grocer's Workers of the world, unite! sign, oppressing those below them and in turn oppressed by those above. Against this public lie is contrasted a life lived in truth, a title suggested by Aleksandr Solzhenitsyn and his essay "Live Not By Lies". Havel argued that the restoration of a free society could only be achieved through a paradigm based on the individual, "human existence", and a fundamental reconstitution of one's "respect for self, for others and for the universe;" to refuse to give power to empty slogans and meaningless rituals, to refuse to allow the lie to oppress one, and to refuse to be part of the lie that oppresses others. By doing so individuals illuminate their surroundings revealing to others that they have power.

=== Overcoming powerlessness ===
Havel proposes that the oppressed always contain "within themselves the power to remedy their own powerlessness…" Havel argued that by an individual "living in truth" in their daily life they automatically differentiate themselves from the officially mandated culture prescribed by the State; since power is only effective inasmuch as citizens are willing to submit to it.

Havel explained step-by-step that the powerlessness of the powerful is traceable to several factors: Those who rule at the top of the pyramid are fundamentally incapable of controlling every aspect of an individual citizen's life despite their best efforts to do so. And those in petty power positions all the way down the line perform the prescribed rituals mandated by the State yet it is this blind obedience which in turn tends to dull the perceptions of the leaders at the top—inadvertently opening space for those who wish not to conform.

Official power is further eroded by the ideological rituals that the entire power structure depend on, and "that are ever less credible, exactly because they are untested by public discussion and controversy." Havel argued that the part of a human being that yearns for freedom, truth, and self-dignity can never be fully repressed.

Havel echoed Patočka's sentiment that no matter what the situation, individuals carry responsibility with them. Therefore it is possible to not allow oneself to be humiliated by superiors anymore, or intimidated by the secret police. Havel argued that this oppression can never be universal if even a single person doesn't give it power over them. Havel felt that all that is suffered over time under such systems often leads to deeper reflection: "There are times, when we must sink to the bottom of our misery to understand truth, just as we must descend to the bottom of a well to see the stars in broad daylight." Havel wrote that "living in truth" means rejecting the notion that power is something to be grasped or abolished. Havel instead argues that power is relational.

Havel said the written laws in the East and West are pretty similar. The difference is in their administration. "Demanding that the laws be upheld… threatens the whole mendacious structure at its point of maximum mendacity." People were "easily and inconspicuously locked up for copying banned books." However, "policemen, prosecutors, or judges… exposed to public attention… suddenly and anxiously begin to take particular care that no cracks appear in the [legal] ritual."

=== Forms of opposition to the regime ===
In later sections, Havel writes of what form opposition in such regimes could take and the nature of being a dissident in the circumstances of the time, using the example of Charter 77. Havel's political program being a breaking with both the traditional forms of governing and opposition. He contrasts Tomáš Garrigue Masaryk's observation of the limits of grassroots organization, of so-called small works, with the example of the Polish Workers' Defence Committee (Komitet Obrony Robotników, or KOR) and of what could be achieved through an independent social life and organization to achieve "social self-defense". Such a defense throughout the then Eastern Bloc having as its basis the defense of human and civil rights.

Havel touches upon the concepts articulated by fellow dissident and Charter 77 signatory, Václav Benda, who had earlier described "parallel structures" of "parallel institutions" within a society more responsive to human needs. He points out that the first person in Czechoslovakia to formulate and put into practice a concept of a "second culture" was Ivan Martin Jirous; although Jirous was mainly referring to events such as rock music concerts.

=== Toward a "post-democratic" system ===
Havel concludes the essay with a discussion about democracy and the problems of technology. He rejects the view that the only answer to a post-totalitarian regime would be to establish parliamentary democracy.

To cling to the notion of traditional parliamentary democracy as one’s political ideal and to succumb to the illusion that only this tried and true form is capable of guaranteeing human beings enduring dignity and an independent role in society would, in my opinion, be at the very least shortsighted.

He calls for an "existential revolution" that goes "significantly beyond the framework of classical parliamentary democracy" and that can thus be called post-democratic: "Having introduced the term 'posttotalitarian' for the purposes of this discussion, perhaps I should refer to the notion I have just outlined – purely for the moment – as the prospects for a 'post-democratic' system." The post-democratic system he envisages should

…provide hope of a moral reconstitution of society, which means a radical renewal of the relationship of human beings to what I have called the 'human order,' which no political order can replace. A new experience of being, a renewed rootedness in the universe, a newly grasped sense of higher responsibility, a newfound inner relationship to other people and to the human community-these factors clearly indicate the direction in which we must go.

== Impact ==
After the fall of the communist regimes of central-eastern Europe in 1989, which included the Fall of the Berlin Wall and Czechoslovakia's Velvet Revolution, observers hearkened back to the writings of dissidents who had dissected the inherent weaknesses in the political regimes. Solidarity activist Zbigniew Bujak said of the essay, "When I look at the victories of Solidarity, and of Charter 77, I see in them an astonishing fulfillment of the prophecies and knowledge contained in Havel's essay."

Václav Havel was elected as the first and only president of the post-communist Czechoslovakia and then the first president of the Czech Republic after the dissolution of Czechoslovakia on 31 December 1992.

== Other ==
On January 20, 2026, Mark Carney, Prime Minister of Canada, delivered a speech at the World Economic Forum's annual meeting in Davos. Carney referred to Havel's essay (details here) and received a standing ovation for his speech.

== See also ==
- The Captive Mind
- Czechoslovak Socialist Republic
- Dissolution of Czechoslovakia

== Notes ==
- The content of this article is based in part on the corresponding article at the Czech Wikipedia.
