= 1993 Civic Democratic Party leadership election =

Czech political party election

- 29 November 1993
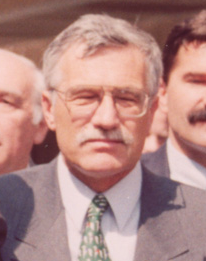
Candidate	Václav Klaus
Electoral vote	220
Percentage	82%
Leader of ODS before election
Václav Klaus
Elected Leader of ODS
Václav Klaus

A leadership election for the Civic Democratic Party (ODS) was held on 29 November in Kopřivnice, Czech Republic. Václav Klaus was reelected as the party's leader. He received 220 votes while 48 delegates voted against him. Klaus's victory was considered certain. Václav Benda had a speech during the election in which he criticised Klaus' politics. Election was marked by technical problems. After voting was finished, it was found out that there were 5 more votes than delegates. Election was then repeated.
