= Kaycee Madu =

Canadian politician (born c. 1974)

The Honourable Kaycee Madu KC ECA

Deputy Premier of Alberta
- In office October 24, 2022 – June 9, 2023 Serving with Nathan Neudorf
- Premier: Danielle Smith
- Preceded by: Sarah Hoffman (2016)
- Succeeded by: Mike Ellis

Minister of Skilled Trades and Professions
- In office October 24, 2022 – June 9, 2023
- Premier: Danielle Smith
- Preceded by: Himself (as minister of Labour and Immigration)
- Succeeded by: Matt Jones (as Minister of Jobs, Economy and Trade)

Minister of Labour and Immigration
- In office February 25, 2022 – October 24, 2022
- Premier: Jason Kenney
- Preceded by: Tyler Shandro
- Succeeded by: Himself (as minister of Skilled Trades and Professions); Rajan Sawhney (as minister of Trade, Immigration and Multiculturalism)

Minister of Justice and Solicitor General
- In office August 25, 2020 – February 25, 2022 (Note: Leave of absence from January 17, 2022, to February 25, 2022.)
- Premier: Jason Kenney
- Preceded by: Doug Schweitzer
- Succeeded by: Tyler Shandro

Minister of Municipal Affairs
- In office April 30, 2019 – August 25, 2020
- Premier: Jason Kenney
- Preceded by: Shaye Anderson
- Succeeded by: Tracy Allard

Member of the Legislative Assembly of Alberta for Edmonton-South West
- In office April 16, 2019 – May 1, 2023
- Preceded by: Thomas Dang
- Succeeded by: Nathan Ip

Personal details
- Born: Kelechi Madu; 1973 or 1974 (age 52–53) Mbaise, Imo State, Nigeria
- Party: United Conservative Party
- Occupation: Lawyer; politician

Kelechi "Kaycee" Madu KC ECA (born 1973 or 1974) is a Canadian lawyer and politician. As a member of the United Conservative Party (UCP), Madu represented Edmonton-South West in the Legislative Assembly of Alberta from 2019 to 2023. He was elected in the 2019 provincial election. He was Alberta's minister of municipal affairs from 2019 to 2020, minister of justice and solicitor general of Alberta from 2020 to 2022 (the first Black person to serve as a provincial minister of justice in Canada).

Madu was shuffled to the labour and immigration portfolio in 2022 after a probe into a phone call he made to Edmonton's chief of police after receiving a traffic ticket. The probe found that Madu had not interfered in the administration of justice, but that his phone call to the chief of police created a "reasonable perception of interference".

Following the election of Danielle Smith as leader of the UCP and her appointment as premier, Madu was named her deputy premier. He served in this role from October 24, 2022. Madu lost his seat in the assembly in the 2023 Alberta general election to school trustee Nathan Ip.

== Early life ==
Madu was born and raised in Southeastern Nigeria, and attended the University of Lagos graduating with a Bachelor of Laws, and being called to the bar in Nigeria. He immigrated to Edmonton in 2005 with his wife Emem for her postgraduate studies at the University of Alberta.

Madu would work for Alberta Hospital, Legal Aid Alberta and the Government of Alberta in a number of different roles.

== Political career ==
Kelechi Madu was an active member of the Progressive Conservative Association of Alberta, organizing delegate selection meetings, and later supporting the merger of the party with the Wildrose Party in 2017. Madu would volunteer and support Jason Kenney during the 2017 PC leadership election and the 2017 United Conservative Party leadership election following the merger.

During the 2019 Alberta general election Madu would contest the constituency of Edmonton-South West, which was previously held by New Democratic Party MLA Thomas Dang, who chose to run in Edmonton-South following the 2017 electoral boundary redistribution. Madu would defeat four candidates capturing 10,245 votes (45%), above the next closest candidate John Archer, a former reporter for the Canadian Broadcasting Corporation, and Brian Mason's press secretary, representing the NDP with 9,539 (42%). Madu would be the only United Conservative Party candidate elected within the boundaries of the city of Edmonton.

In the 2023 Alberta general election, Madu was defeated in the Edmonton-South West riding by New Democratic Party candidate Nathan Ip.

=== Minister of Municipal Affairs ===
On April 30, 2019, Madu was appointed to the Executive Council of Alberta as the Minister of Municipal Affairs, and held that role until August 25, 2020, when he was appointed Minister of Justice and Solicitor General.

Early in his mandate, Madu wrote an op-ed published in Postmedia newspapers titled Spending by Alberta's two big cities— is unsustainable which called on municipal leaders in Calgary City Council and Edmonton City Council to lower spending and reduce taxes, claiming the cities placed an "undue burden" on residents. The article was published on October 22, 2019, two days prior to the introduction of the provincial budget. Claims made in the op-ed were challenged by the Mayors of Calgary and Edmonton, including that the data supplied by Canadian Federation of Independent Business significantly overestimated the 10-year growth in municipal expenditures, and did not account for inflation.

During his time as Minister of Municipal Affairs, Madu was responsible for a number of controversial funding reductions to Alberta municipalities. Among those decisions, included the repealing of the City Charters Fiscal Framework Act which legislated provincial transfers to the Cities of Edmonton and Calgary; reductions to the Municipal Sustainability Initiative, an infrastructure financing program which was reduced cumulatively by $236-million over two years from 2020–21 to 2021–22; and reduction of the Grants in Place of Taxes program by 50%, which provides municipalities with grants which off-set the property tax requisitions for provincially owned buildings. Madu oversaw the beginning of property assessment valuation changes to oil and gas infrastructure, changing from a valuation based on the replacement cost, to the depreciated value of the asset, which led to the leaders of a number of rural municipalities in Alberta speaking out. According to CTV News, municipalities in rural Alberta raised concerns that the proposed changes would "cost them millions" by reducing the property tax base by between $108-million to $291-million.

Madu introduced Local Authorities Election Amendment Act, 2020 (Bill 29) to the Alberta Legislature in June 2020, which amended the legislation which outlines the rules for municipal and school board elections. The amendments to the Local Authorities Election Act removed the requirement for candidates to disclose their donors prior to election day, removed limits on spending by third-party advertisers outside the local election campaign period from May 1 to election day in October, and allowed individuals to donate up to $5,000 to as many candidates as they want during an election. The Alberta Urban Municipalities Association, which represents urban municipal elected officials in Alberta released a statement shortly after the introduction of Bill 29, stating the relationship between Minister Madu and the association was "Broken". Bill 29 and other policy decisions were cited as the reason for the statement by the AUMA. One month following the statement, Premier Jason Kenney shuffled his Cabinet, moving Madu to Minister of Justice and Solicitor General, and promoting backbench MLA Tracy Allard to the role of Minister of Municipal Affairs.

On March 4, 2020, Kaycee Madu was designated as a Queen's Counsel by the lieutenant governor of Alberta via an Order-in-Council. Queen's Counsel is the highest honour awarded to lawyers who have made significant contributions to the advancement of law and society.

=== Minister of Justice and Solicitor General of Alberta ===
Madu was named Minister of Justice and Solicitor General of Alberta in August 2020. As the first Black person to serve in the role, as well as his work experience with the legal aid system, Madu's appointment was praised for bringing "much-needed perspective".

==== Lethbridge police ====
In March 2021, CBC News reported that the Lethbridge Police Service monitored the environment minister under the previous New Democratic government, among other scandals. This prompted Madu to give an April 16 deadline to the service to "address issues of recruiting, training, oversight, discipline, transparency and communications". Upon receipt of the service's submission, Madu indicated his disappointment. In January 2022, the service signed an agreement which would begin an inquiry surrounding the issues.

==== Traffic ticket incident ====
On March 10, 2021, Madu was stopped by the Edmonton Police Service and issued a traffic ticket for using his cellphone while driving in a school zone. Following the incident, Madu would call Chief of Police Dale McFee, raising concerns about the context of the stop, discussing people of colour being stopped by police and tension with the Lethbridge Police Service. McFee later stated that Madu did not ask for the ticket to be rescinded.

The incident was revealed on January 17, 2022 and prompted calls for Madu's resignation.

Madu was placed on a leave of absence later in the day by Premier Jason Kenney pending the conclusion of a probe into his conduct. In the interim, energy minister Sonya Savage assumed his position in an acting capacity.

An investigation into the matter by Alberta Court of Queen's Bench judge Adele Kent found that Madu had not interfered in the administration of justice, but that his phone call to the chief of police created a "reasonable perception of interference."

=== Minister of Labour and Immigration ===
On February 25, 2022, Madu was moved from his position as justice minister to Minister of Labour and Immigration in a role swap with Tyler Shandro, who took over as justice minister.

=== Deputy Premier and Minister of Skilled Trades and Professions ===
On October 24, 2022, Madu was named deputy premier along with Nathan Neudorf by premier Danielle Smith. He served in this role until the dissolution of the 30th Alberta legislature on May 1, 2023.

He was defeated in the 2023 Alberta general election by the NDP's Nathan Ip.

== Post-political career ==
Madu resumed working as a lawyer in private practice after his defeat in the 2023 Alberta general election. In October 2024, the Law Society of Alberta issued a decision that Madu's conduct in the Edmonton traffic ticket incident was a breach of a lawyer's professional duties constituting grounds for sanction. In February 2025, a law society panel issued a formal reprimand of Madu, refused Madu's request that no formal sanction report be released, and ordered him to pay $39,000 pending any appeals of the decision.

== Electoral history ==
=== 2023 general election ===
2023 Alberta general election: Edmonton-South West
Party	Candidate	Votes	%	±%
New Democratic	Nathan Ip	14,380	56.52	+14.67
United Conservative	Kaycee Madu	10,741	42.21	-2.77
Green	Jeff Cullihall	323	1.27	+0.72
Total		25,444	99.41	–
Rejected and declined		150	0.59	
Turnout		25,594	62.71	
Eligible voters		40,811		
New Democratic gain from United Conservative		Swing		+8.72
Source(s) Source: Elections Alberta

=== 2019 general election ===
2019 Alberta general election: Edmonton-South West
Party	Candidate	Votes	%	±%
United Conservative	Kaycee Madu	10,254	44.99	+5.96
New Democratic	John Archer	9,539	41.85	-11.97
Alberta Party	Mo Elsalhy	2,668	11.70	+9.04
Alberta Advantage	Marilyn Burns	208	0.91	–
Green	Rigel Vincent	125	0.55	–
Total		22,794	99.29	–
Rejected, spoiled and declined		162	0.71	
Turnout		22,956	70.15	
Eligible voters		32,726		
United Conservative notional gain from New Democratic		Swing		+8.97
Source(s) Source: "43 - Edmonton-South West, 2019 Alberta general election". officialresults.elections.ab.ca. Elections Alberta. Alberta. Chief Electoral Officer (2019). 2019 General Election. A Report of the Chief Electoral Officer. Volume II (PDF) (Report). Vol. 2. Edmonton, Alta.: Elections Alberta. pp. 168–170. ISBN 978-1-988620-12-1.

Alberta provincial government of Jason Kenney
Cabinet posts (2)
Predecessor	Office	Successor
Doug Schweitzer	Minister of Justice and Solicitor General; August 25, 2020–	Incumbent
Shaye Anderson	Minister of Municipal Affairs; April 30, 2019–August 25, 2020	Tracy Allard
