= Edmonton Riverbend =

Federal electoral district in Alberta, Canada

Alberta electoral district
- Interactive map of riding boundaries from the 2025 federal election

Federal electoral district
- Legislature: House of Commons
MP
Matt Jeneroux
Liberal
- District created: 2013
- First contested: 2015
- Last contested: 2025
- District webpage: profile, map

Demographics
- Population (2016): 120,863
- Electors (2019): 86,609
- Area (km²): 60
- Pop. density (per km²): 2,014.4
- Census division: Division No. 11
- Census subdivision: Edmonton (part)

Edmonton Riverbend is a federal electoral district in Alberta. Edmonton Riverbend was created by the 2012 federal electoral boundaries redistribution and was legally defined in the 2013 representation order. It came into effect upon the call of the 2015 Canadian federal election, scheduled for October 2015.

It was created out of part of the electoral district of Edmonton—Leduc.

On October 19, 2015 Matt Jeneroux was the first elected Member of Parliament for the Electoral District receiving 49.9% of the vote.

== Demographics ==
Panethnic groups in Edmonton Riverbend (2011−2021)
Panethnic group	2021		2016		2011	
Panethnic group	Pop.	%	Pop.	%	Pop.	%
European (Note: Statistic includes all persons that did not make up part of a visible minority or an indigenous identity.)	64,115	51.97%	67,640	56.59%	65,405	62.26%
East Asian (Note: Statistic includes total responses of "Chinese", "Korean", and "Japanese" under visible minority section on census.)	20,565	16.67%	19,165	16.03%	15,620	14.87%
South Asian	14,395	11.67%	12,140	10.16%	9,695	9.23%
Southeast Asian (Note: Statistic includes total responses of "Filipino" and "Southeast Asian" under visible minority section on census.)	6,475	5.25%	5,865	4.91%	4,600	4.38%
African	5,665	4.59%	4,555	3.81%	2,535	2.41%
Middle Eastern (Note: Statistic includes total responses of "West Asian" and "Arab" under visible minority section on census.)	4,495	3.64%	3,750	3.14%	3,450	3.28%
Indigenous	3,815	3.09%	2,985	2.5%	2,570	2.45%
Latin American	1,990	1.61%	1,640	1.37%	1,365	1.3%
Other/Multiracial (Note: Statistic includes total responses of "Visible minority, n.i.e." and "Multiple visible minorities" under visible minority section on census.)	1,835	1.49%	1,790	1.5%	1,100	1.05%
Total responses	123,360	99.37%	119,535	98.9%	105,055	98.83%
Total population	124,144	100%	120,863	100%	106,302	100%
Notes: Totals greater than 100% due to multiple origin responses. Demographics based on 2012 Canadian federal electoral redistribution riding boundaries.

== Members of Parliament ==
This riding has elected the following members of the House of Commons of Canada:

Parliament	Years	Member	Party
Edmonton Riverbend; Riding created from Edmonton—Leduc
42nd	2015–2019	Matt Jeneroux	Conservative
43rd	2019–2021	Matt Jeneroux	Conservative
44th	2021–2025	Matt Jeneroux	Conservative
45th	2025–2026	Matt Jeneroux	Conservative
45th	2026–present	Matt Jeneroux	Liberal

== Election results ==
View source data.
Graph of election results in Edmonton Riverbend (minor parties that never got 2% of the vote or didn't run consistently are omitted). 2011 Results redistributed from Edmonton—Leduc

=== 2023 representation order ===
2025 Canadian federal election
Party	Candidate	Votes	%	±%	Expenditures
Conservative	Matt Jeneroux	30,343	50.24	+4.80	$101,366.68
Liberal	Mark Minenko	27,075	44.83	+19.90	$38,315.13
New Democratic	Susan Cake	2,563	4.24	–20.19	$5,691.57
People's	Dwayne Dudiak	410	0.68	–3.34	$36.00
Total valid votes/expense limit		60,391	99.29	–	$131,098.97
Total rejected ballots		431	0.71	+0.16	
Turnout		60,822	70.43	+4.20	
Eligible voters		86,361			
Conservative notional hold		Swing		–7.54	
Source: Elections Canada

2021 federal election redistributed results
Party	Vote	%
Conservative	22,145	45.44
Liberal	12,149	24.93
New Democratic	11,907	24.43
People's	1,957	4.02
Green	559	1.15
Others	19	0.04

=== 2013 representation order ===
2021 Canadian federal election
Party	Candidate	Votes	%	±%	Expenditures
Conservative	Matt Jeneroux	25,702	45.15	–12.29	$79,019.97
Liberal	Tariq Chaudary	14,169	24.89	+1.93	$44,524.84
New Democratic	Shawn Gray	14,154	24.86	+9.60	$7,582.76
People's	Jennifer Peace	2,142	3.76	+2.36	$1,212.75
Green	Melanie Hoffman	761	1.34	–1.60	none listed
Total valid votes/expense limit		56,928	99.45	–	$115,650.64
Total rejected ballots		312	0.55	+0.01	
Turnout		57,240	66.23	–4.19	
Eligible voters		86,420			
Conservative hold		Swing		–7.11	
Source: Elections Canada

2019 Canadian federal election
Party	Candidate	Votes	%	±%	Expenditures
Conservative	Matt Jeneroux	35,126	57.44	+7.56	$68,359.52
Liberal	Tariq Chaudary	14,038	22.96	–7.23	$85,937.49
New Democratic	Audrey Redman	9,332	15.26	–1.79	$2,918.70
Green	Valerie Kennedy	1,797	2.94	+0.73	$1,722.37
People's	Kevin Morris	855	1.40	–	none listed
Total valid votes/expense limit		61,148	99.46	–	$112,723.19
Total rejected ballots		329	0.54	+0.23	
Turnout		61,477	70.42	+0.03	
Eligible voters		87,305			
Conservative hold		Swing		+7.39	
Source: Elections Canada

2015 Canadian federal election
Party	Candidate	Votes	%	±%	Expenditures
Conservative	Matt Jeneroux	28,805	49.89	–9.49	$126,240.74
Liberal	Tariq Chaudary	17,428	30.18	+15.69	$62,340.29
New Democratic	Brian Fleck	9,846	17.05	–4.12	$44,795.24
Green	Valerie Kennedy	1,275	2.21	–2.75	$6,040.67
Libertarian	Steven Lack	386	0.67	–	$500.00
Total valid votes/expense limit		57,740	99.69	–	$216,148.06
Total rejected ballots		178	0.31	–	
Turnout		57,918	70.38	–	
Eligible voters		82,290			
Conservative hold		Swing		–12.59	
Source: Elections Canada

2011 federal election redistributed results
Party	Vote	%
Conservative	25,690	59.38
New Democratic	9,159	21.17
Liberal	6,271	14.49
Green	2,147	4.96

== See also ==
- List of Canadian electoral districts
- Historical federal electoral districts of Canada
