= Nathan Ip =

Canadian politician

Member of the Legislative Assembly of Alberta for Edmonton-South West
- Incumbent
- Assumed office May 29, 2023
- Preceded by: Kaycee Madu

Personal details
- Born: 1981 or 1982 (age 43–44) Taiwan
- Party: New Democratic

Nathan Ip (born 1981 or 1982) is a Canadian politician from the Alberta New Democratic Party. He is the MLA for Edmonton-South West, after unseating former Minister of Justice and former Deputy Premier Kaycee Madu in the 2023 Alberta general election. Madu also served as Minister of Skilled Trades and Professions. Before his election to the legislature, Ip was an Edmonton Public School Board Trustee for Ward H from 2013 to 2023.

== Early life ==
Ip was born in Taiwan and immigrated to Canada in the 1980s. His parents ran a restaurant in Edmonton.

== Political career ==
Ip was elected as a Edmonton Public School Board trustee in 2013 representing Ward H.

As of June 21, 2024, he serves as the Official Opposition critic for Jobs, Economy and Trade.

== Electoral history ==
=== 2023 general election ===
2023 Alberta general election: Edmonton-South West
Party	Candidate	Votes	%	±%
New Democratic	Nathan Ip	14,380	56.52	+14.67
United Conservative	Kaycee Madu	10,741	42.21	-2.77
Green	Jeff Cullihall	323	1.27	+0.72
Total		25,444	99.41	–
Rejected and declined		150	0.59	
Turnout		25,594	62.71	
Eligible voters		40,811		
New Democratic gain from United Conservative		Swing		+8.72
Source(s) Source: Elections Alberta
