= Edmonton-South West =

Provincial electoral district in Alberta, Canada

Alberta electoral district
- Edmonton-South West within the City of Edmonton, 2017 boundaries

Provincial electoral district
- Legislature: Legislative Assembly of Alberta
MLA
Nathan Ip
New Democratic
- District created: 2010
- First contested: 2012
- Last contested: 2023

Edmonton-South West is a provincial electoral district in Edmonton, Alberta, Canada. The district was created in the 2010 boundary redistribution and is mandated to return a single member to the Legislative Assembly of Alberta using the first past the post voting system.

== History ==
The electoral district was created in the 2010 Alberta boundary re-distribution. It was created from the south part of Edmonton-Whitemud below Anthony Henday Drive and the south and western portion of Edmonton-McClung along Anthony Henday as well.

=== Boundary history ===
44 Edmonton-South West 2010 boundaries
Bordering districts
North	East	West	South
Edmonton-McClung, Edmonton-Meadowlark, Edmonton-Rutherford and Edmonton-Whitemud	Edmonton-Ellerslie and Edmonton-Mill Woods	Stony Plain	Leduc-Beaumont
Legal description from the Statutes of Alberta 2010, Electoral Divisions Act.

=== Electoral history ===
Members of the Legislative Assembly for Edmonton-South West
Assembly	Years	Member	Party
See Edmonton-McClung 1993-2012 and Edmonton-Whitemud 1971-2012
28th	2012–2015	Matt Jeneroux	Progressive Conservative
29th	2015–2019	Thomas Dang	New Democratic
30th	2019–2023	Kaycee Madu	United Conservative
31st	2023–	Nathan Ip	New Democratic

The electoral district was created from the electoral districts of Edmonton-McClung and Whitemud. The area has had a recent history of switching between conservative and non-conservative parties.

During the 2019 Alberta general election MLA Thomas Dang chose to run in Edmonton-South following the 2017 Electoral Boundary Re-distribution. UCP candidate Madu would defeat four candidates capturing 10,245 votes (45%), above the next closest candidate John Archer representing the NDP with 9,539 (42%).

== Legislative election results ==
=== 2023 ===
2023 Alberta general election
Party	Candidate	Votes	%	±%
New Democratic	Nathan Ip	14,380	56.52	+14.67
United Conservative	Kaycee Madu	10,741	42.21	-2.77
Green	Jeff Cullihall	323	1.27	+0.72
Total		25,444	99.41	–
Rejected and declined		150	0.59	
Turnout		25,594	62.71	
Eligible voters		40,811		
New Democratic gain from United Conservative		Swing		+8.72
Source(s) Source: Elections Alberta

=== 2019 ===
2019 Alberta general election
Party	Candidate	Votes	%	±%
United Conservative	Kaycee Madu	10,254	44.99	+5.96
New Democratic	John Archer	9,539	41.85	-11.97
Alberta Party	Mo Elsalhy	2,668	11.70	+9.04
Alberta Advantage	Marilyn Burns	208	0.91	–
Green	Rigel Vincent	125	0.55	–
Total		22,794	99.29	–
Rejected, spoiled and declined		162	0.71	
Turnout		22,956	70.15	
Eligible voters		32,726		
United Conservative notional gain from New Democratic		Swing		+8.97
Source(s) Source: "43 - Edmonton-South West, 2019 Alberta general election". officialresults.elections.ab.ca. Elections Alberta. Alberta. Chief Electoral Officer (2019). 2019 General Election. A Report of the Chief Electoral Officer. Volume II (PDF) (Report). Vol. 2. Edmonton, Alta.: Elections Alberta. pp. 168–170. ISBN 978-1-988620-12-1.

=== 2015 ===
2015 Alberta general election
Party	Candidate	Votes	%	±%
New Democratic	Thomas Dang	12,352	54.41%	45.89%
Progressive Conservative	Matt Jeneroux	6,316	27.82%	-28.64%
Wildrose	Cole Kander	2,290	10.09%	-7.93%
Liberal	Rudy Arcilla	1,199	5.28%	-9.67%
Alberta Party	Krishna Tailor	543	2.39%	0.35%
Total		22,700	–	–
Rejected, spoiled and declined		81	35	21
Eligible electors / turnout		41,230	55.30%	3.99%
New Democratic gain from Progressive Conservative		Swing		-5.93%
Source(s) Source: "44 - Edmonton-South West, 2015 Alberta general election". officialresults.elections.ab.ca. Elections Alberta. Chief Electoral Officer (2016). 2015 General Election. A Report of the Chief Electoral Officer (PDF) (Report). Edmonton, Alta.: Elections Alberta.

2015 Alberta general election redistributed results
Party	Votes	%
New Democratic	7,048	53.82
Progressive Conservative	3,563	27.21
Wildrose	1,547	11.81
Liberal	588	4.49
Alberta Party	349	2.67
Source(s) Source: Ridingbuilder

=== 2012 ===
2012 Alberta general election
Party	Candidate	Votes	%	±%
Progressive Conservative	Matt Jeneroux	8,502	56.47%	–
Wildrose Alliance	Allan Hunsperger	2,713	18.02%	–
Liberal	Rudy Arcilla	2,251	14.95%	–
New Democratic	Muriel Stanley Venne	1,283	8.52%	–
Alberta Party	Bryan Peacock	308	2.05%	–
Total		15,057	–	–
Rejected, spoiled and declined		75	42	3
Eligible electors / turnout		29,493	51.32%	–
Progressive Conservative pickup new district.				
Source(s) Source: "44 - Edmonton-South West, 2012 Alberta general election". officialresults.elections.ab.ca. Elections Alberta. Chief Electoral Officer (2012). The Report of the Chief Electoral Officer on the 2011 Provincial Enumeration and Monday, April 23, 2012 Provincial General Election of the Twenty-eighth Legislative Assembly (PDF) (Report). Edmonton, Alta.: Elections Alberta. Archived (PDF) from the original on May 6, 2021.

== See also ==
- List of Alberta provincial electoral districts
- Canadian provincial electoral districts
