= Mark Carney's Davos speech =

"Principled and Pragmatic: Canada's Path"
- Part of the premiership of Mark Carney
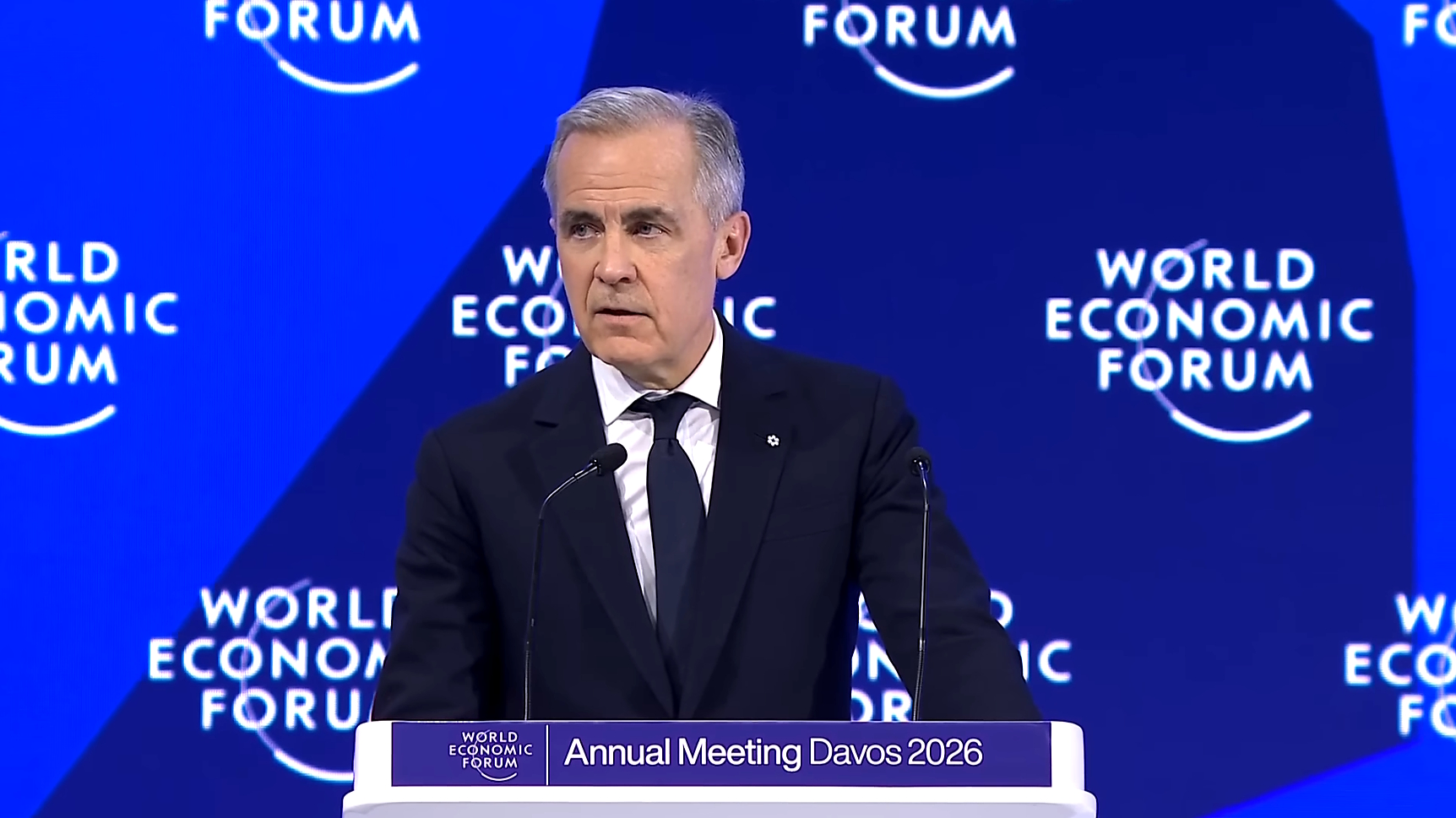
- Carney delivering the address at the World Economic Forum
- Date: 20 January 2026
- Venue: 56th World Economic Forum
- Location: Davos, Switzerland
- Participants: Mark Carney
- Footage: Video on YouTube

On 20 January 2026, Mark Carney, Prime Minister of Canada, delivered his speech "Principled and Pragmatic: Canada's Path" at the 56th World Economic Forum. It is widely considered to be a veiled denunciation of United States policy under the second Donald Trump administration, which has engaged in aggressive trade wars (including against Canada) and sparked a crisis involving several countries by pursuing territorial expansion. Carney's call to action advocated greater cooperation between the world's middle powers and other smaller countries in order to protect their vital interests in light of what he termed a "rupture" in the world order due to erratic shifts in U.S. foreign and economic policies.

In his speech, Carney stated that the rules-based world order of the post–Cold War era, enabled by "American hegemony", had experienced "a rupture, not a transition", and called on middle powers to unite against economic coercion from great powers, which "have begun using economic integration as weapons, tariffs as leverage, financial infrastructure as coercion, [and] supply chains as vulnerabilities to be exploited." Carney argued that if middle powers united in the face of this perceived geopolitical shift, then they had much to gain from "genuine cooperation", stating that "middle powers must act together because if we're not at the table, we're on the menu."

Following his speech, Carney received a standing ovation from the other attendees—unusual for World Economic Forum meetings—and his statements drew praise from many world leaders and commentators. However, it was sharply criticized by Trump, who remarked that "Canada lives because of the United States" during his speech at the event on the next day. Trump also rescinded Canada's invitation, which had not yet been accepted, to join the founding charter of his Board of Peace and threatened to levy 100% tariffs on Canada unless the Carney government backed down from a new Canadian trade agreement with China.

== Background and context ==
Carney delivered the speech amid escalating tensions between Canada and the United States over trade and sovereignty. Throughout the prior year, President Trump had repeatedly threatened to impose tariffs on Canadian goods and made comments about making Canada the "51st state", prompting Canadians to limit travel to and imports from America and prioritize Canadian-made goods. Trump had also put pressure on Denmark to cede control of Greenland, threatening European nations with tariffs if they opposed his demands.

Prior to Trump's 51st state comments, Canadian opposition politician and Conservative Party leader Pierre Poilievre was widely predicted to be headed towards an election victory in spring of 2025 due to the unpopularity of Carney's predecessor Justin Trudeau. Despite Trump's comments that Poilievre was "not a MAGA guy", a perceived ideological alignment between Poilievre and the American president became a key election issue. Carney, who became prime minister in March 2025 after winning the Liberal Party of Canada leadership and subsequently led his party to a fourth consecutive electoral victory in April 2025, had made reducing Canada's economic dependence on the United States a central policy priority. The former Governor of the Bank of Canada (2008–2013) and Governor of the Bank of England (2013–2020) had spent nearly 60 days abroad since taking office, pursuing new trade agreements and investment partnerships.

=== Event details ===
The address took place on January 20, 2026, from 16:30 to 17:00 Central European Time at the World Economic Forum's 56th Annual Meeting. Following his prepared remarks, Carney participated in a moderated discussion with Gideon Rachman, associate editor and chief foreign affairs commentator at the Financial Times, and Laurence D. Fink, chair and CEO of BlackRock and interim co-chair of the WEF.

== Content ==
Full speech and discussion (31:10)

Carney began his speech in French, saying that there was a "rupture in the world order, the end of a nice story and the beginning of a brutal reality where geopolitics among the great powers is not subject to any constraints," but pledged that "other countries, particularly middle powers like Canada, are not powerless. They have the capacity to build a new order that embodies our values, like respect for human rights, sustainable development, solidarity, sovereignty and territorial integrity of states."

Continuing in English, Carney described the current international situation as an era of great power rivalry where the rules-based international order was fading. He quoted the Melian Dialogue of the ancient Greek historian, Thucydides, "That the strong do what they can, and the weak suffer what they must", which is a classical example of realism in international relations.

He then referred to Czech political dissident Václav Havel's 1978 essay The Power of the Powerless, that discussed the ability of totalitarian communist states to sustain themselves and how citizens under those regimes could build resistance. Carney stated that those states sustained themselves "not through violence alone, but through the participation of ordinary people in rituals they privately know to be false ... The system's power comes not from its truth but from everyone's willingness to perform as if it were true. And its fragility comes from the same source: when even one person stops performing." Carney linked this to the current international situation, saying that Canada and other countries had willingly participated in an international order that they knew to be "partially false", overlooking the fact that the rules and institutions of this order were applied unevenly because they benefitted from its predictability and the protections that order gave them. Carney specifically referred to "American hegemony", saying that it had "helped provide public goods: open sea lanes, a stable financial system, collective security and support for frameworks for resolving disputes. So, we placed the sign in the window. We participated in the rituals. And we largely avoided calling out the gaps between rhetoric and reality. This bargain no longer works."

Carney then declared that the world was "in the midst of a rupture, not a transition", saying that a range of crises since the beginning of the 21st century had brought the downsides of the international order to the forefront and that the institutions that middle powers relied on (such as the conference of the parties, the World Trade Organization, and the United Nations) were under direct threat from the great powers. He stated that many middle powers had consequently begun a shift towards prioritising strategic autonomy, but warned that "a world of fortresses will be poorer, more fragile and less sustainable ... the question for middle powers, like Canada, is not whether to adapt to the new reality – we must. The question is whether we adapt by simply building higher walls or whether we can do something more ambitious."

Carney then reaffirmed Canada's commitment to international cooperation, to human rights, and to the values underlined in the Charter of the United Nations. He discussed several steps that his government was taking, including cutting taxes, removing interprovincial trade barriers, increased infrastructure investment and defence spending, and diversifying its international trade agreements. He also reaffirmed Canada's commitment to NATO and to Greenland's right to self-determination. He stated that "to help solve global problems, we are pursuing variable geometry – in other words, different coalitions for different issues based on common values and interests." Carney then stated that "middle powers must act together because if we're not at the table, we're on the menu," calling for middle powers to stop invoking the rules-based international order, to apply the same standards to allies and enemies, to build a new international order, and to reduce the leverage that great powers had over them. Carney concluded by calling for "honesty about the world as it is", saying that "The powerful have their power. But we have something too – the capacity to stop pretending, to name reality, to build our strength at home and to act together. That is Canada's path. We choose it openly and confidently. And it is a path wide open to any country willing to take it with us."

== Analysis ==
Commentators characterized the speech as a significant departure from Canada's traditional approach to U.S. relations. The Conversation noted that Carney "articulated both the historical context and current dynamics of international relations, presenting insights that are seldom expressed by active politicians." Carney's speech, which he wrote himself, was compared and contrasted favourably against Trump's speech at the same venue the following day.

Bob Rae, writing in Policy magazine, compared the speech's significance to Louis St. Laurent's 1947 Gray Lecture, which defined Canada's postwar international role, calling it a moment when "Canadians were given a clear sense" of the nation's place on the global stage.

The Carnegie Endowment for International Peace analyzed the speech as "uncharacteristically candid both for Davos and a Canadian," noting that Carney "laid out, for all to hear, the catastrophic implications of Washington's current policies for global order and signaled that at least one erstwhile ally is prepared not only to hedge against an unpredictable and predatory United States, but if need be to balance against it."

Other commentators offered more critical perspectives. Economist Tyler Cowen, writing on his blog Marginal Revolution, argued that Carney could "talk back" precisely because "he knows America will defend Canada, including against Russia, no matter what." Nesrine Malik wrote in The Guardian that the end of the rules-based order had been made obvious by the war on terror and Gaza genocide, but that Carney had only acknowledged it "once the rot reached his own door". Malik also criticized Carney for not acknowledging the victims of the "hypocrisies" of the rules-based order.

== Reactions ==
=== Immediate response ===
The speech received a rare standing ovation from the assembled global leaders and business executives in Davos. Bob Rae, Canada's former ambassador to the United Nations, stated he had "never seen a global reaction to a speech" like Carney's.

=== International leaders ===
Alexander Stubb, President of Finland, called it "one of the best speeches we've heard here in Davos this week," praising its "profound analysis of the evolving world order" and emphasis on "values-based realism".

Mark Rutte, Secretary General of NATO, said the speech is evidence that "Canada is back" as a pivotal NATO participant and global leader, stating, "I hold him in high regard. He delivered a speech that was strong on Canadian values."

Gavin Newsom, Governor of California, said that "numerous leaders from the United States privately sent me the transcript of the speech saying 'Wow,'" and praised Carney for his "courage and conviction."

Jim Chalmers, Treasurer of Australia, described the speech as "stunning... very impactful, thoughtful, and certainly widely shared and discussed in our government and undoubtedly around the globe." Former Australian Prime Minister Malcolm Turnbull suggested that Anthony Albanese should deliver a similar message: "We will not be intimidated; we will uphold our sovereignty."

Carl Bildt, former Prime Minister of Sweden, wrote on X: "Very important and very well put remarks by Canadian PM Mark Carney. It's time to take down the sign and speak out."

Alastair Campbell, former communications director for UK Prime Minister Tony Blair, called the speech "real leadership" and "one of the best—and most important—of recent times."

Claudia Sheinbaum, President of Mexico, said that Carney delivered a "very good speech" that was "in tune with the current times." The speech was also praised by lawmakers from both the governing Morena party and the opposition Citizens' Movement party.

In March 2026, Mette Frederiksen, Prime Minister of Denmark, praised the speech and thanked Carney "from the bottom of [her] heart", stating that it had prompted considerable discussion across the Nordic countries.

=== Donald Trump ===
Although the speech did not mention U.S. president Donald Trump by name, comments about threats to Greenland made by his administration, coupled with a trade deal with China signed the previous week by Carney, led to media analysis that the speech was aimed at the United States.

Trump made a speech at Davos on the day after Carney in which he directly responded, "Canada lives because of the United States. They should be grateful to us, Canada... I watched your prime minister yesterday. He wasn't so grateful, they should be grateful to us, Canada. Canada lives because of the United States. Remember that, Mark, the next time you make your remarks." On the day after that, Trump revoked Carney's invitation to his Board of Peace, which had its inaugural meeting at Davos. Carney had already left Davos without meeting Trump and made a national address that day in Quebec City in which he continued to assert Canada's independence, stating that "Canada and the United States have built a remarkable partnership in the economy, in security, and in rich cultural exchange. But Canada doesn't live because of the United States."

=== Canadian response ===
In Canada, the speech drew praise across the political spectrum. However, some domestic conservative commentators said Carney's comments about the United States should have been instead directed to China.

Conservative MP Michelle Rempel Garner challenged Carney to translate "the realities of fractured geopolitics" into concrete actions with clear timelines, criticizing the speech for lacking specific policy details.

On February 18, 2026, Conservative MP Matt Jeneroux crossed the floor to the Liberals, citing Carney's speech as a contributing factor. He had previously announced in November 2025 that he would be resigning from Parliament in the spring of 2026.

== See also ==
- Fulton Speech – Churchill's "Iron Curtain" speech, to which Carney's speech has been compared
- 2025 United States trade war with Canada and Mexico
- Tariffs in the second Trump administration
