= Greengrocer =

Selling point of fruits and vegetables

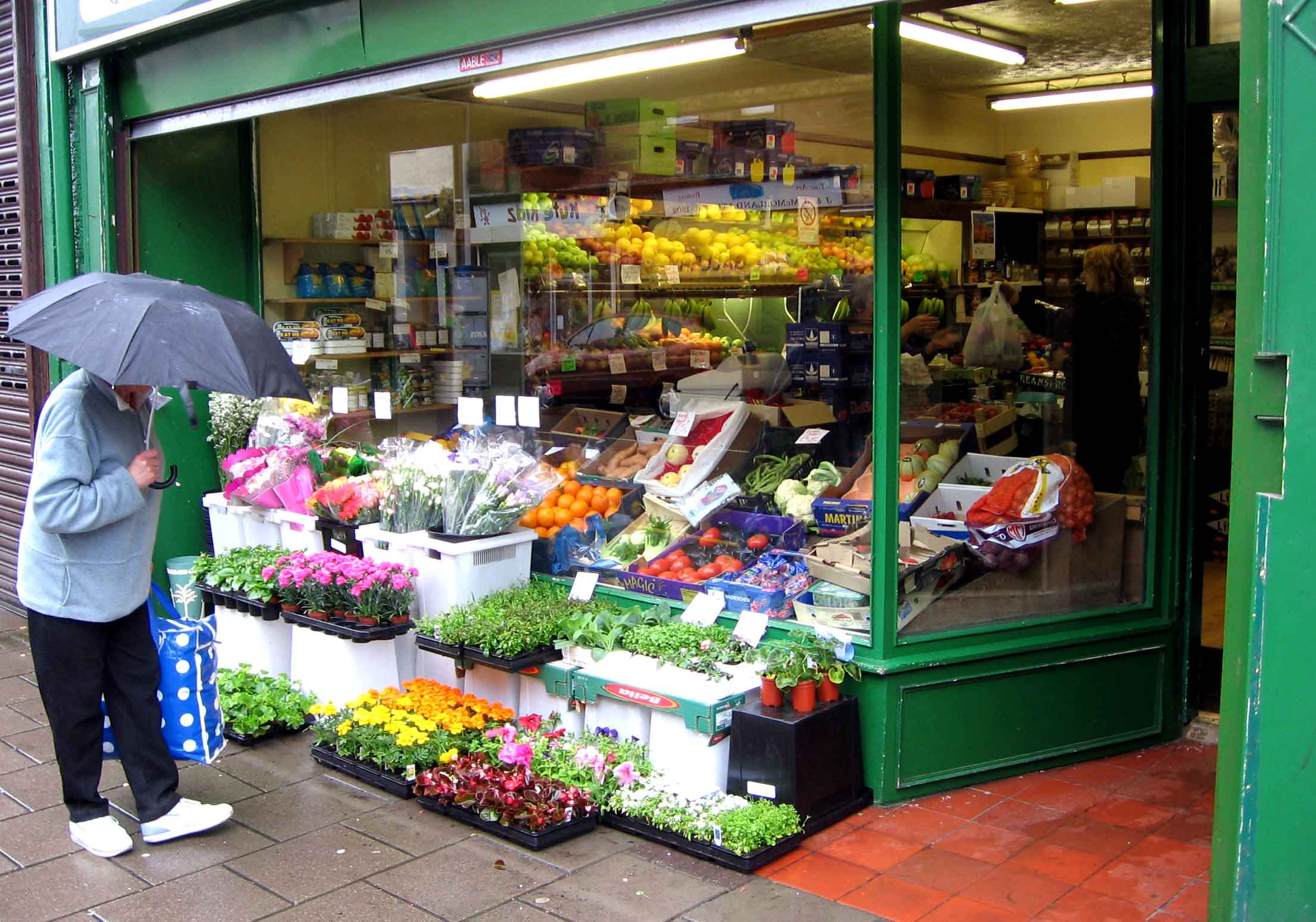
In front of a greengrocer's shop in Gourock, Scotland

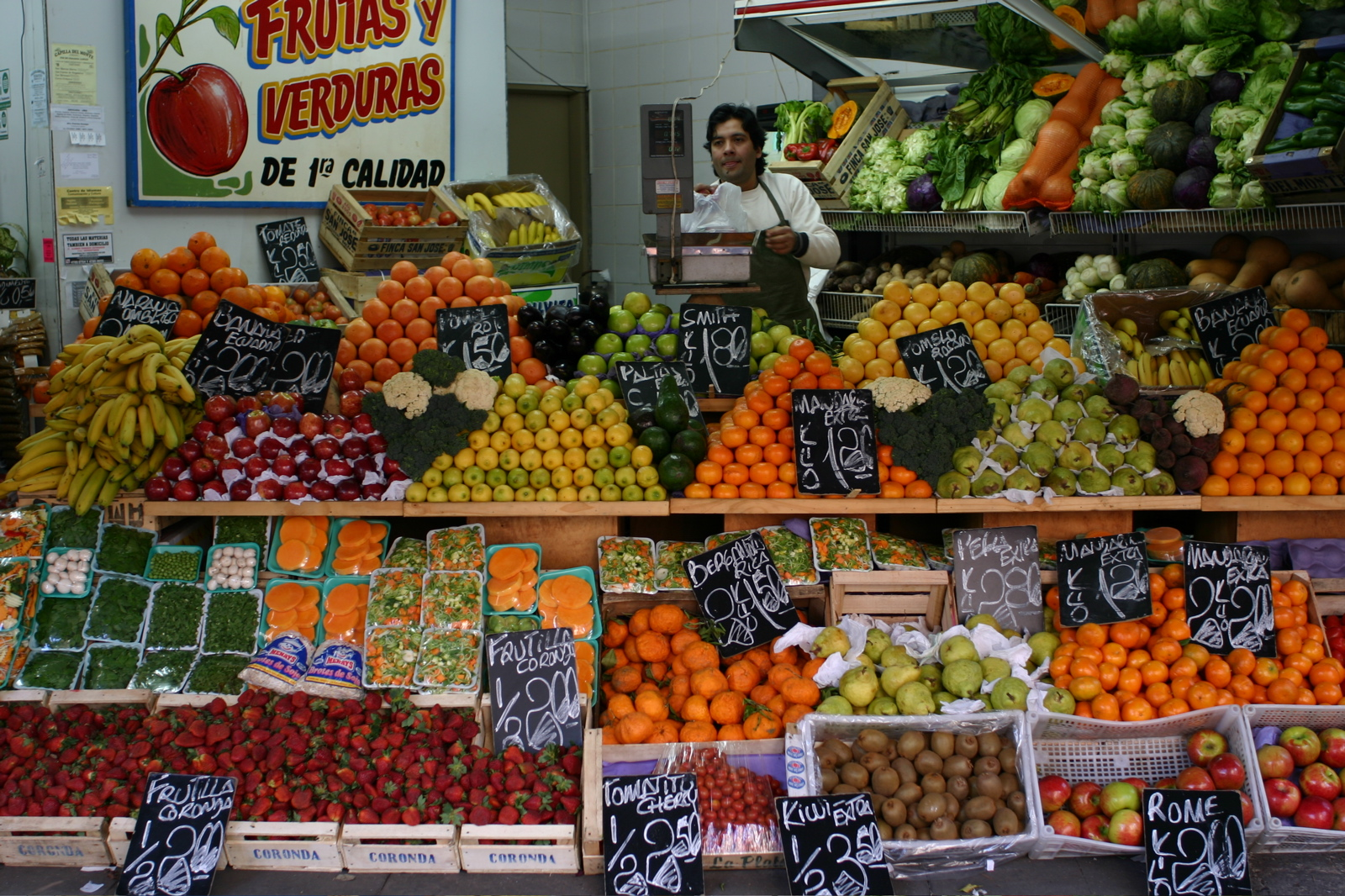
Greengrocer's shop in Buenos Aires

A greengrocer or (Australian English; often) fruiterer is a person who owns or operates a shop selling primarily fruit and vegetables. The term may also be used to refer to a shop selling primarily produce. It is used predominantly in the United Kingdom and Australia.

In the United States, the terms produce store or produce shop are used. By the 1940s, produce sales (measured in tonnage) made at grocery stores had surpassed those made at produce stores.

While once common in the United Kingdom and Australia, the increase in popularity of supermarkets caused greengrocer shops to become rarer, though they may still be found in smaller towns and villages. Today, greengrocers can also be found in street markets, malls, and supermarket produce departments.

== Greengrocers' apostrophe ==
Because of its common misuse on greengrocers' signs (e.g apple's, orange's, or banana's), an apostrophe used incorrectly to form a plural is known as a greengrocers' apostrophe.

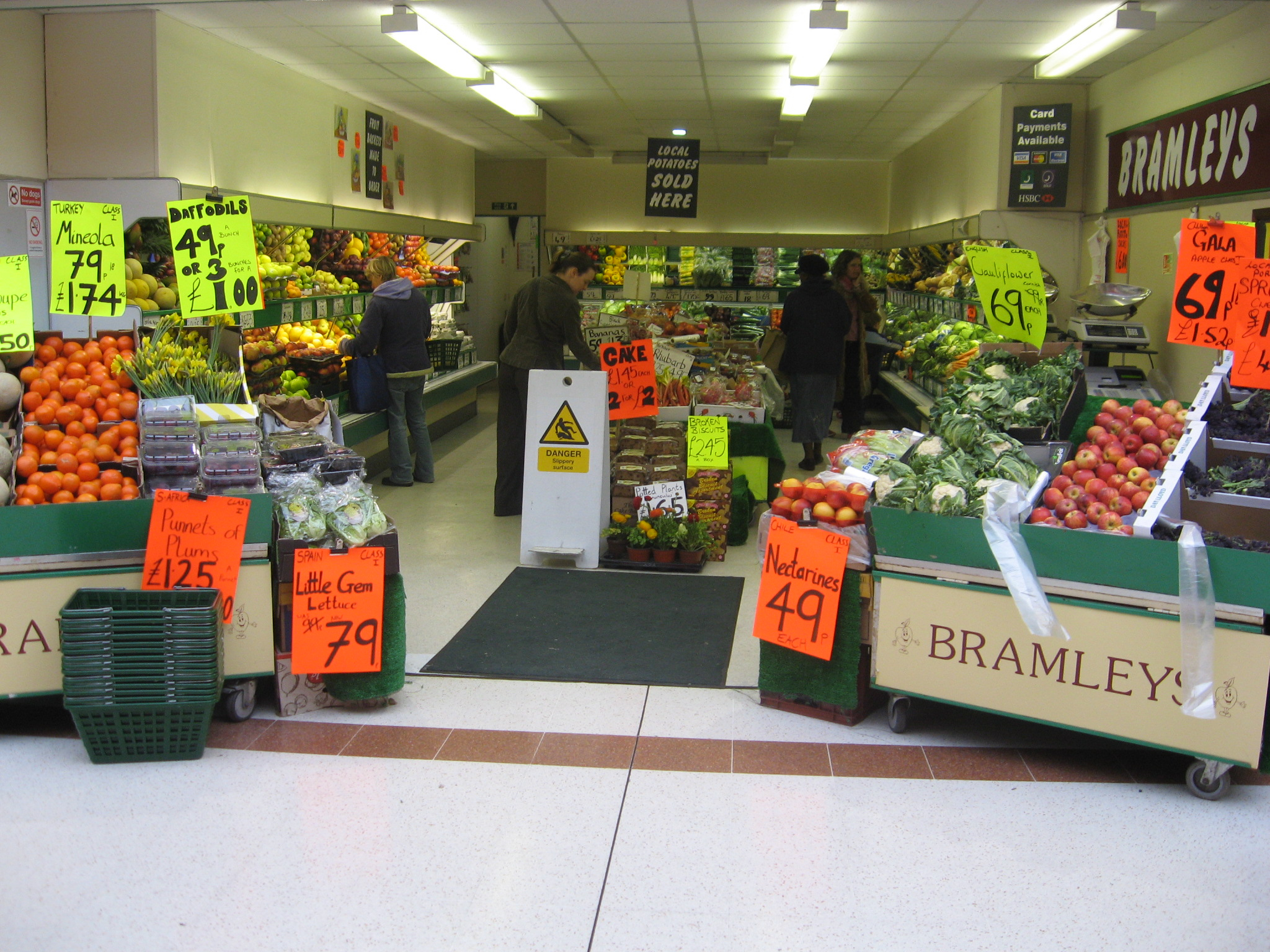
Interior of a greengrocer's shop in Stroud, Gloucestershire, England

== See also ==
- Fruit stand
- The Power of the Powerless § Havel's greengrocer
