= Rhiannon Hoyle =

Canadian politician

Member of the Legislative Assembly of Alberta for Edmonton-South
- Incumbent
- Assumed office May 29, 2023
- Preceded by: Thomas Dang

Personal details
- Born: Trinidad and Tobago
- Party: NDP
- Other political affiliations: Alberta Party (former)

Rhiannon Hoyle is a member of the Alberta New Democratic Party and was elected in 2023 to represent the district of Edmonton-South, succeeding outgoing MLA Thomas Dang.

She is the first Black woman elected to the Alberta Legislature.

== Biography ==
Hoyle was born in Trinidad and Tobago, before she immigrated to Canada in 1992. She spent her time extracurricular time helping to alleviate poverty, assisting vulnerable populations, and strengthening communities by volunteering and working in the inner city under one of Canada’s most revered educational pioneers, Dr. Stephen Ramsankar, a UN Global Citizen and member of the Order of Canada..

She holds a degree from the University of Alberta in Political Science with a specialization in International Political Economy and International Relations, and a certificate in Globalization and Governance.

Prior to joining the NDP, Hoyle served as the president of the Alberta Party.

Hoyle has volunteered with Edmonton Federation of Community Leagues, and also sat as the President of the Heritage Point Community League, Vice President of Southwest Area Council, and District K Rep in Edmonton..

Alongside her non-profit and volunteer work, Hoyle co-owned and operated a lab as the Business Development Director for over 10 years. This lab specialized in Compressed Breathing Air Analysis and medical gas testing used for oil field and hazardous environment workers, including firefighters and commercial divers. The lab held companies accountable by ensuring that the equipment used by union workers in these fields was up to CSA Group and Occupational safety and health standards..

Hoyle was a publicly elected Senator at the University of Alberta for six years. In that time, she sat on the Chancellor’s Executive Committee, the Indigenous Initiatives and Equity, Diversity, and Inclusion Committee, and as the Co-Chair of USchool Fundraising, which aims to introduce and connect students from socially vulnerable, Indigenous, and rural communities to the University of Alberta.

She also sat as a Campaign Cabinet Member for the Centre for Sexual and Gender Diversity alongside Dr. Kristopher Wells and executive leadership at MacEwan University. The Centre supports research, teaching and service work related to sexual orientation, gender identity and gender expression.

In October 2021, she ran in the Edmonton municipal election to represent ward Ipiihkoohkanipiaohtsi on the Edmonton City Council and lost by 33 votes.

On May 29, 2023, Hoyle became the first Black woman elected to the Alberta Legislature after winning the 2023 Alberta general election to represent the Edmonton-South electoral district.

Hoyle was named Critic for Advanced Education on June 27, 2023..

She now serves as the Shadow Minister of Jobs, Economy, and Trade..

== Electoral history ==
=== 2023 general election ===
2023 Alberta general election: Edmonton-South
Party	Candidate	Votes	%	±%
New Democratic	Rhiannon Hoyle	14,171	58.97	+12.34
United Conservative	Joseph Angeles	9,492	39.50	-3.67
Green	Chryssy Beckmann	369	1.54	+0.75
Total		24,032	99.28	–
Rejected and declined		174	0.72	
Turnout		24,206	60.12	
Eligible voters		40,262		
New Democratic hold		Swing		+8.00
Source(s) Source: Elections Alberta
