= Matt Jeneroux =

Canadian politician (born 1981)

Matt Jeneroux MP
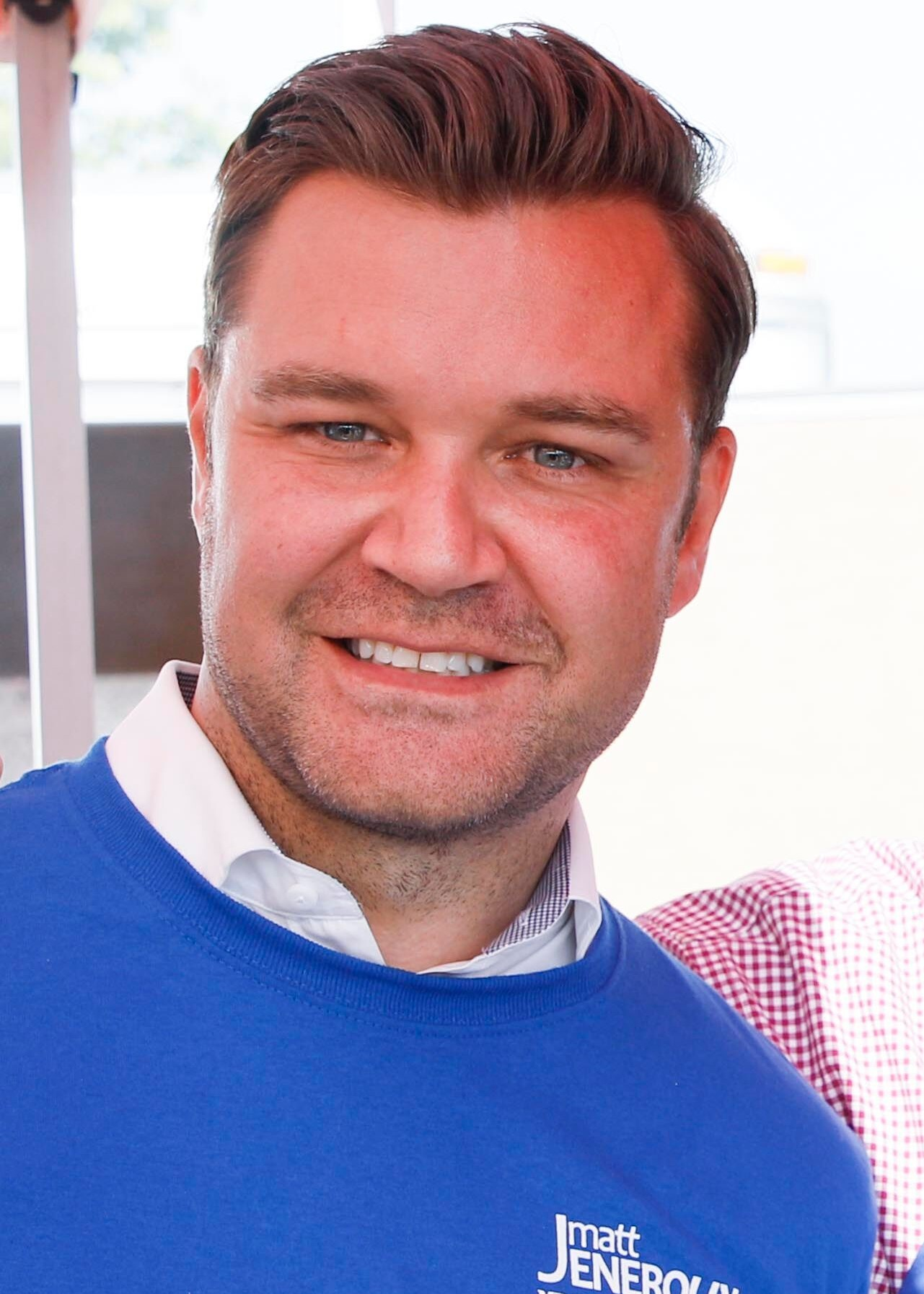
- Jeneroux in 2019

Member of Parliament for Edmonton Riverbend
- Incumbent
- Assumed office October 19, 2015
- Preceded by: James Rajotte

Special Advisor on Economic and Security Partnerships
- Incumbent
- Assumed office 26 February 2026
- Prime Minister: Mark Carney
Shadow cabinet portfolios
Shadow Minister for Supply Chains
In office October 2022 – February 2026
Leader	Pierre Poilievre
Preceded by	Randy Hoback
Succeeded by	TBA
Shadow Minister of Housing and Diversity and Inclusion
In office November 2021 – October 2022
Leader	Erin O’Toole; Candice Bergen
Preceded by	Brad Vis
Succeeded by	Scott Aitchison
Shadow Minister of Health
In office December 2019 – September 2020
Leader	Andrew Scheer
Preceded by	Marilyn Gladu
Succeeded by	Michelle Rempel Garner
Shadow Minister for Infrastructure
Leader	Andrew Scheer
Preceded by	Michael Chong
Succeeded by	Luc Berthold
Shadow Minister for Innovation, Science & Economic Development
Leader	Andrew Scheer
Preceded by	Maxime Bernier
Succeeded by	Dan Albas
Shadow Minister for Science
Leader	Andrew Scheer
Preceded by	Marilyn Gladu
Succeeded by	Michael Chong
Official Opposition Critic for Western Economic Diversification
Leader	Rona Ambrose
Preceded by	Michelle Rempel
Succeeded by	Tom Lukiwski

Member of the Legislative Assembly of Alberta for Edmonton-South West
- In office April 23, 2012 – May 5, 2015
- Preceded by: Riding established
- Succeeded by: Thomas Dang

Personal details
- Born: Matthew James Arthur Jeneroux; 1980 or 1981 (age 45) Edmonton, Alberta, Canada
- Party: Liberal
- Other political affiliations: Federal: Conservative (until 2026); Provincial: Alberta PC (until 2017); United Conservative (2017–2026)
- Spouse: Elizabeth Clement (m. 2016)
- Children: 2
- Education: University of Alberta (BA)
- Occupation: Politician; teacher

Matthew James Arthur Jeneroux (born 1980 or 1981) is a Canadian politician who served as the member of Parliament (MP) for Edmonton Riverbend since 2015. Currently a member of the Liberal Party, Jeneroux was elected as a Conservative in the 2015 federal election and crossed the floor to the Liberals in 2026, one of several floor crossings to the Liberals subsequent to the 2025 Canadian federal election. He previously served as a Progressive Conservative (PC) member of the Legislative Assembly of Alberta (MLA), representing Edmonton-South West from 2012 to 2015.

== Provincial politics (2012–2015) ==
Jeneroux was first elected to the provincial assembly in the 2012 provincial election as a Progressive Conservative. In spring 2013, one year after being elected, he introduced a private member's bill entitled Compassionate Care Leave Legislation (Bill 203). The bill was given royal assent and provides a leave of absence for an employee from their employer while taking care of a terminally ill family member.

Over the course of three years, two of his motions passed unanimously in the legislature. First, to provide support for playgrounds when new schools for young families are built in the province of Alberta. He also urged the provincial government to conduct a review of the childcare policy in the province. He chaired the Standing Committee on Legislative Offices. He was defeated in the 2015 provincial election by Alberta NDP candidate Thomas Dang.

He also chaired the Capital Region Caucus Youth Secretariat and was a member of the Alberta Treasury Board committee. In addition, he chaired Results Based Budgeting for Environment and Resource Stewardship, chaired Results Based Budgeting for Wellness, was a member of the Public Accounts Committee, co-chaired the Alberta Film Advisory Council, and chaired the Government of Alberta's Youth Advisory Panel.

In 2018, Jeneroux was named the co-chair of the United Conservative Party Annual General Meeting in Red Deer, Alberta.

== Federal politics (2015–present) ==
Jeneroux has also been a member of the Parliamentary Standing Committee of Access to Information, Privacy and Ethics, a Member of the Standing Committee on Environment and Sustainable Development, a member of the Standing Committee on Public Accounts, vice-chair on the Standing Committee for Industry, a member of the Standing Committee on Transportation & Infrastructure, vice-chair of the Standing Committee on Health and currently serves on International Trade committee.

=== Health Shadow Minister ===
As a federal MP, Jeneroux was the Conservative Party of Canada Shadow Minister for Health.

As Health Canada Shadow Minister, Jeneroux received praise for being the first to raise concerns in Parliament on the urgency of COVID-19 and lack of preparedness of the Public Health Agency of Canada. He has also sought to have Dr. Bruce Aylward from the World Health Organization appear before the Parliamentary committee responsible for investigating Canada's response to COVID-19.

Jeneroux also announced his private member's bill, the federal expansion of Compassionate Care Leave. This bill built off the previous work from Jeneroux's provincial private member's bill at the national level.

=== Infrastructure Shadow Minister ===
Jeneroux has served previously as the Shadow Minister for Infrastructure, Communities & Urban Affairs. As Infrastructure Canada Shadow Minister, Jeneroux has also been one of the fiercest critics of Canada's Infrastructure Bank, going so far as calling for its cancellation. He did so publicly in an article published in the Financial Post where he calls it an outright failure of the Trudeau Liberals.

=== Innovation Shadow Minister ===
Jeneroux served in the role as Shadow Minister for Innovation, Science and Economic Development and as Shadow Minister of Science. Jeneroux was critical of the Minister of Innovation, Science and Economic Development in the press in calling for his government's long-awaited Space Strategy.

Previously, under Rona Ambrose, he served in the Shadow Cabinet as the Official Opposition Critic for Western Economic Diversification.

It was during this time that Jeneroux was named co-chair of the Alberta Jobs Task Force, a federal Conservative caucus initiative that will collect information from Albertans affected by the current economic situation and produce a report to be tabled in the House of Commons.

In this role, Jeneroux tabled a motion to promote the use of geothermal technology for the use in orphan and abandoned oil wells in western Canada. His motion, with support from the geothermal industry, called on the Government of Canada to examine ways to reduce the legislative burden of using geothermal technology within Canada.

During the 43rd Canadian Parliament, Jeneroux's private member's bill, An Act to amend the Canada Labour Code (bereavement leave) (Bill C-220), was adopted with all-party support to extend bereavement leave from 5 to 10 days and entitle employees already on compassionate care leave to also claim bereavement leave.

=== Floor-crossing ===
On November 6, 2025, Jeneroux announced his intention to resign as a member of Parliament in the spring of 2026. The news came the same week that the Liberal government released its budget, and that fellow Conservative MP Chris d'Entremont crossed the floor to the Liberal Party. Jeneroux said "It was not an easy decision, but it is, I believe, the right one." Jeneroux denied that coercion played a role in his resignation. Following his announcement, Jeneroux did not appear in the House of Commons. He also declared that he would donate his parliamentary salary to Edmonton-area charities.

On February 18, 2026, Jeneroux crossed the floor to the Liberal Party and announced he would not be resigning from the House of Commons. Jeneroux cited Mark Carney's Davos speech as the reason he decided to stay on and work with the government. He became the third Conservative MP to defect to the Liberals during the 45th Parliament after d'Entremont and Michael Ma. Carney also appointed Jeneroux as his special advisor on economic and security partnerships.

== Recognition ==
After founding the Hi Dad Foundation for men's mental health in 2022, Jeneroux was awarded the CAMIMH Champions of Mental Health Award in the Parliamentarian category in 2024.

Jeneroux was a recipient of both the Queen Elizabeth II Diamond Jubilee Medal in 2012, the Queen Elizabeth II Platinum Jubilee Medal in 2022 and the King's Coronation medal in 2024.

In both 2016 and 2017, Jeneroux was voted one of the top "up-and-comers” in Parliament in an annual readership poll by The Hill Times.

== Personal life ==
Jeneroux is married to surgeon Elizabeth Clement. He has a son, Hugh, and two daughters, Molly and Lilly. His family resides in Victoria, British Columbia.

== Electoral history ==
=== Federal ===
2025 Canadian federal election: Edmonton Riverbend
Party	Candidate	Votes	%	±%	Expenditures
Conservative	Matt Jeneroux	30,343	50.24	+4.80	$101,366.68
Liberal	Mark Minenko	27,075	44.83	+19.90	$38,315.13
New Democratic	Susan Cake	2,563	4.24	–20.19	$5,691.57
People's	Dwayne Dudiak	410	0.68	–3.34	$36.00
Total valid votes/expense limit		60,391	99.29	–	$131,098.97
Total rejected ballots		431	0.71	+0.16	
Turnout		60,822	70.43	+4.20	
Eligible voters		86,361			
Conservative notional hold		Swing		–7.54	
Source: Elections Canada

2021 Canadian federal election: Edmonton Riverbend
Party	Candidate	Votes	%	±%	Expenditures
Conservative	Matt Jeneroux	25,702	45.15	–12.29	$79,019.97
Liberal	Tariq Chaudary	14,169	24.89	+1.93	$44,524.84
New Democratic	Shawn Gray	14,154	24.86	+9.60	$7,582.76
People's	Jennifer Peace	2,142	3.76	+2.36	$1,212.75
Green	Melanie Hoffman	761	1.34	–1.60	none listed
Total valid votes/expense limit		56,928	99.45	–	$115,650.64
Total rejected ballots		312	0.55	+0.01	
Turnout		57,240	66.23	–4.19	
Eligible voters		86,420			
Conservative hold		Swing		–7.11	
Source: Elections Canada

2019 Canadian federal election: Edmonton Riverbend
Party	Candidate	Votes	%	±%	Expenditures
Conservative	Matt Jeneroux	35,126	57.44	+7.56	$68,359.52
Liberal	Tariq Chaudary	14,038	22.96	–7.23	$85,937.49
New Democratic	Audrey Redman	9,332	15.26	–1.79	$2,918.70
Green	Valerie Kennedy	1,797	2.94	+0.73	$1,722.37
People's	Kevin Morris	855	1.40	–	none listed
Total valid votes/expense limit		61,148	99.46	–	$112,723.19
Total rejected ballots		329	0.54	+0.23	
Turnout		61,477	70.42	+0.03	
Eligible voters		87,305			
Conservative hold		Swing		+7.39	
Source: Elections Canada

2015 Canadian federal election: Edmonton Riverbend
Party	Candidate	Votes	%	±%	Expenditures
Conservative	Matt Jeneroux	28,805	49.89	–9.49	$126,240.74
Liberal	Tariq Chaudary	17,428	30.18	+15.69	$62,340.29
New Democratic	Brian Fleck	9,846	17.05	–4.12	$44,795.24
Green	Valerie Kennedy	1,275	2.21	–2.75	$6,040.67
Libertarian	Steven Lack	386	0.67	–	$500.00
Total valid votes/expense limit		57,740	99.69	–	$216,148.06
Total rejected ballots		178	0.31	–	
Turnout		57,918	70.38	–	
Eligible voters		82,290			
Conservative hold		Swing		–12.59	
Source: Elections Canada

=== Provincial ===
2015 Alberta general election: Edmonton-South West
Party	Candidate	Votes	%	±%
New Democratic	Thomas Dang	12,352	54.41%	45.89%
Progressive Conservative	Matt Jeneroux	6,316	27.82%	-28.64%
Wildrose	Cole Kander	2,290	10.09%	-7.93%
Liberal	Rudy Arcilla	1,199	5.28%	-9.67%
Alberta Party	Krishna Tailor	543	2.39%	0.35%
Total		22,700	–	–
Rejected, spoiled and declined		81	35	21
Eligible electors / turnout		41,230	55.30%	3.99%
New Democratic gain from Progressive Conservative		Swing		-5.93%
Source(s) Source: "44 - Edmonton-South West, 2015 Alberta general election". officialresults.elections.ab.ca. Elections Alberta. Chief Electoral Officer (2016). 2015 General Election. A Report of the Chief Electoral Officer (PDF) (Report). Edmonton, Alta.: Elections Alberta.

2012 Alberta general election: Edmonton-South West
Party	Candidate	Votes	%	±%
Progressive Conservative	Matt Jeneroux	8,502	56.47%	–
Wildrose Alliance	Allan Hunsperger	2,713	18.02%	–
Liberal	Rudy Arcilla	2,251	14.95%	–
New Democratic	Muriel Stanley Venne	1,283	8.52%	–
Alberta Party	Bryan Peacock	308	2.05%	–
Total		15,057	–	–
Rejected, spoiled and declined		75	42	3
Eligible electors / turnout		29,493	51.32%	–
Progressive Conservative pickup new district.				
Source(s) Source: "44 - Edmonton-South West, 2012 Alberta general election". officialresults.elections.ab.ca. Elections Alberta. Chief Electoral Officer (2012). The Report of the Chief Electoral Officer on the 2011 Provincial Enumeration and Monday, April 23, 2012 Provincial General Election of the Twenty-eighth Legislative Assembly (PDF) (Report). Edmonton, Alta.: Elections Alberta. Archived (PDF) from the original on May 6, 2021.
