= John Keane (political theorist) =

Australian political theorist

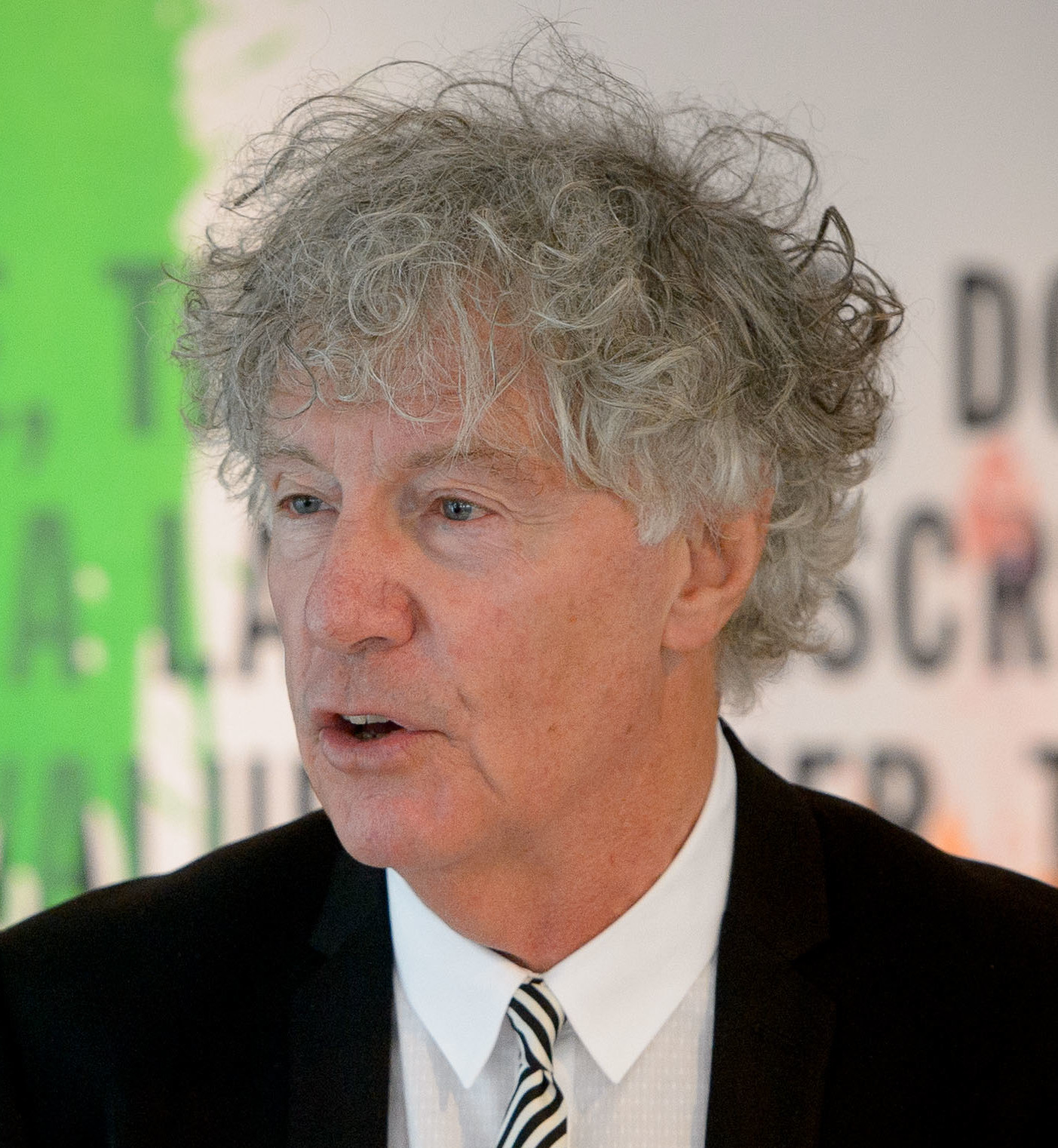
Keane in 2015

John Keane (born 1949) is an Australian political theorist. He is a professor of politics at the University of Sydney. For 25 years he also held a position at the Wissenschaftszentrum Berlin (WZB), which he resigned from in November 2023.

In 2021 Keane published the book To Kill a Democracy: India's Passage to Despotism co-authored by Debasish Roy Chowdhury.

== Career ==
Keane first studied Politics, Government and History at the University of Adelaide, winning the Tinline Prize for a First Class Honours with Highest Distinction (1971). He won a Commonwealth Fellowship to study at the University of Toronto, where in the fields of philosophy and political economy he was awarded a doctorate and mentored and supervised by C.B. Macpherson. He later held a post-doctoral fellowship at King's College, at the University of Cambridge, where he worked closely with Anthony Giddens, Quentin Skinner and other leading scholars.

John Keane is renowned globally for his creative thinking about democracy. Well before the European revolutions of 1989, John Keane first came to public prominence as a theorist and defender of 'civil society' and the democratic opposition in central-eastern Europe. Throughout the 1980s, he contributed extensively to the programme of 'flying university' apartment seminars in Poland, Czechoslovakia and Hungary. His political and scholarly writing during that period was published under the pen name Erica Blair. His Times Literary Supplement series of 18th-century-style dialogues with prominent underground human rights figures such as Adam Michnik and György Konrád was read widely, and translated into many languages. He arranged and edited Václav Havel's first book in English, The Power of the Powerless. In the spring of 1989, just before the revolutions that shook central-eastern Europe, he founded the world's first democracy research institute, the London-based Centre for the Study of Democracy (CSD). During the past decade, he founded and directed the Sydney Democracy Network (SDN). He has contributed to The New York Times, Al Jazeera, the Times Literary Supplement, The Guardian, Harper's, the South China Morning Post and The Huffington Post.

In November 2023 he resigned from WZB after WZB wrote him a letter stating that a tweet of his depicted the Hamas flag, which could "only be understood as support for Hamas and their actions". Keane said the allegations were "absurd" and that "My posting of an image of green flags was … a message to trigger multiple thoughts among its addressees".

== Reception ==
During his many years in Britain, the Times of London described him as 'one of the world's leading political thinkers and writers. El País (Madrid) has ranked him as 'among the world's leading analysts of political systems'. The Australian Broadcasting Commission called him 'one of the great intellectual exports from Australia.' His work has been translated into approximately 35 languages. During the period 2014–2019, his experimental online column "Democracy Field Notes" attracted nearly a million readers in the London, Cambridge- and Melbourne-based The Conversation. Among his best-known books are the prize-winning, best selling Tom Paine: A political life',' Violence and Democracy, Democracy and Media Decadence, and a full-scale history of democracy, The Life and Death of Democracy. Forthcoming in Arabic, it has been published in Chinese, Spanish, Portuguese (European and Brazilian) and Korean; it was short-listed for the Prime Minister's Literary Award (2012) while the Japanese translation (2014) was ranked in the top three non-fiction books of that year published in Japan. His most recent books are When Trees Fall, Monkeys Scatter; Power and Humility: the Future of Monitory Democracy; The New Despotism and The Shortest History of Democracy (2022). He was recently nominated for the 2021 Balzan Prize and the Holberg Prize for outstanding global contributions to the human sciences.

== Monitory democracy ==
In The Life and Death of Democracy, John Keane coined the term monitory democracy for a phase of democracy characterised by instruments of public monitoring and scrutinising of government power. It began following the events of the Second World War.

Monitory institutions refer to 'watch-dog' and 'guide-dog' bodies which subject governments to a public mechanism of checks and balances. Under the theory of monitory democracy these institutions extend the notions of representative democracy to "enfranchise many more citizens voices" in the political process. The ability to publicly monitor government power enabled through these institutions has the effect of changing the political and geographic dynamics of existing representative democracies.

According to Keane, monitory democracy adds to the democratic nature of political representation as it changes the notion from "'one person, one vote, one representative'" and instead embodies the principles of "one person, many interests, many voices, multiple votes, multiple representatives".

=== Criticism ===
Keane's theory of monitory democracy outlined in 'The Life and Death of Democracy' (2009) has been critiqued by Christopher Hobson in a review of the book. Hobson states that it is unclear "whether all the changes Keane identifies collectively constitute something coherent enough to be considered a new kind of democracy". However, he states that monitory democracy provides a "valuable opening to begin discussing these issues, as part of considering the current shape and likely future of democracy".

Reviewing 'The Life and Death of Democracy' (2009) in The Guardian, David Runciman referred to monitory democracy as an "ugly phrase". He critiques the theory as being "at best a partial description of what democracy is and what it needs to be" and adds that "monitory democracy can function only if it learns to co-exist with some of those democratic ideas that Keane is too quick to dismiss...". Noel Malcolm in The Sunday Telegraph argued that "What Keane himself fails to see is that the 'monitory democracy' he celebrates, while it may cut through some hierarchies of power, is busily constructing new hierarchies of its own: an activist elite; human rights judges who act beyond the reach of democratic politics; and so on".
