= To Kill a Democracy =

2021 book about India by Chowdhury and Keane

To Kill a Democracy: India's Passage to Despotism
- Front cover of Pan MacMillan India 2021 edition
- Author: Debasish Roy Chowdhury and John Keane
- Language: English
- Subject: Politics
- Published: 2021
- Publisher: Oxford University Press, Pan MacMillan India
- Publication place: India
- Media type: Hardcover, paperback
- ISBN: 978-0-198-84860-8 978-9-390-74280-6
- Website: Pan MacMillan India; Oxford University Press

To Kill a Democracy: India's Passage to Despotism is a book authored by Debasish Roy Chowdhury and John Keane, published by Oxford University Press in 2021. The Indian edition of the book is published by Pan MacMillan.

== Content ==
The book argues that the incidents in India have global importance. India is the largest democracy by population, making up 33% of the total population of all democracies.

According to the influential 18th century French writer Montesquieu, those who exercise power can be expected to abuse it. Hence a tension between the executive and judiciary is expected and good in a democracy. Nobody is above the law. Authorities in a democracy must always be scrutinised. It is important for the well-being of citizens that the independent court put restraint on the arbitrary use of power by authority. The authors state that the relationship between the executive and judiciary in India was an uneasy compact.

The book talks about the 1973 landmark Kesavananda Bharati judgment of the Supreme Court of India which outlined the 'basic structure' doctrine of the Indian Constitution. The court asserted its right to strike down amendments to the constitution that were in violation of the fundamental architecture of the constitution. In the years that followed, the supreme court delivered significant rulings on secularism and independence of the judiciary in the appointment of judges. These rulings were important for the basic structure. The executive often retaliated by blocking the career advancement of the judges involved in these rulings.

The authors assert that the separation and contest of powers between the executive and judiciary in India was honoured most of the time. There were some instances when the judiciary fell in line instead of pushing back on the executive. They foretold the dangers to the democracy.

The historical causes for the attacks on civil liberties and democratic institutions in the Modi administration are elaborated in the book.

The authors claim that the elections and the separation of powers are not the only things that define a democracy. Democracy is "a whole way of life lived in dignity". The book focuses on the decay in the social foundations in India. The social injustices, restrictions and struggle for livelihood make the government more powerful and greatly affect the meaning of elections for Indians.

The book says that when the democracies destroy their social foundations, they "kill off the spirit and substance of democracy" and "lay the foundations for despotism".

== Editions ==
The United Kingdom edition of the book was published by the Oxford University Press (OUP) in June 2021. In September 2021, the Indian branch of Oxford University Press refused to publish the book in India.

Pan MacMillan Publishers, India released the Indian edition of the book on 16 December 2021.

== Publication in India ==
In April 2021, Oxford University Press had planned to release a low-priced Indian edition of the book in the first week of July. The low-price edition was intended to make the book accessible to the larger audience. The Indian edition launch was scheduled a week after the global edition. In spite of the plans, the Indian edition of the book was not launched in July. In September, after waiting for three months, the authors publicly questioned OUP on social media about the delay in the launch of the Indian edition of the book.

On 30 September 2021, The Telegraph quoted a spokesperson for Oxford University Press, that its "sales team felt the content to be provocative". The report was not denied by OUP.

On 28 May, Roy Chowdhury had written an article in the Time magazine criticising the Modi government's COVID vaccination program. The article was titled, "Modi never bought enough COVID-19 Vaccines for India. Now the world is paying." On 30 May Rashtriya Swayamsevak Sangh (RSS) (Note: RSS is the parent organisation of the political party BJP, running the Indian government since 2014.) through its mouthpiece magazine attacked Debasish Roy Chowdhury for writing the article and the book.

Writing about this incident in Frontline magazine journalist Sarbari Sinha, noted that the RSS magazine had only attacked Roy Chowdhury and did not even mention the co-author John Keane. No other group in India had raised any objections about the book. Yet OUP India decided against publishing the book in India. Sinha inferred that Roy Chowdhury's article on India's COVID vaccination had led to the criticism of the book and subsequent denial of publication. Connecting the inference along with reports from OUP India about "provocative" content made Sinha hint a possibility that OUP India had refused to publish the book due to the criticism of the Indian government by one of the authors of the book. Sinha suggested that this case of self censorship by OUP was bad news for free speech.

== Reception ==
Sarbari Sinha wrote in Frontline magazine that the authors "reject the more comforting option of blaming the current dispensation for the way democracy has been unravelling in India and locate the causes in systemic issues. The narrative is backed up by statistics and brought alive by real-life stories, showing the rigour of academic scholarship and the curiosity that informs the best of journalism."

Mihir Bose, reviewing the book for The Irish Times wrote, "Chowdhury and Keane's well-researched book draws the dismal conclusion that India is now an elective despotism whose parliament rarely sits and whose MPs do not remotely function as lawmakers in a democracy should." Bose followed with other examples of passing bills in the parliament without adequate debates.

== Authors ==
The book is authored by Debasish Roy Chowdhury and John Keane.

Debasish Roy Chowdhury is a Hong Kong-based Indian journalist.

John Keane is a professor of politics at the University of Sydney and at the WZB Berlin Social Science Center. He is known for his publications on democracy.
