= Parallel Polis =

Socio-political concept

Parallel Polis is a socio-political concept created by Czech political thinker and dissident Václav Benda in connection with the informal civic initiative, Charter 77. Benda and other philosophers sought to build a theoretical framework for social events in dissident circles.

== Social structure ==
The alternative culture, or underground, was described in Parallel Polis in 1978 for the first time. A political scientist, Benda noticed the emergence of a new social structure in artistic and intellectual circles as a tool to escape the totalitarian communist regime and detected the following pillars of the new "field":

- Constant monitoring and verification of civic rights and freedoms, which the state tends to restrict. Parallel Polis consists of people who actively advocate for (and protect) their rights.
- "Alternative" (underground) culture is independent, and consists of art which is developed without the permission—or support—of public authorities.
- Parallel education and science, representing the right to free education and the development of scientific research (residential seminars and educational societies and academies)
- A parallel information system as an expression of the right to the free dissemination of information (such as samizdat publishing and unofficial magazines and collections)
- Parallel economy: "Political power considers this area as a critical resource for arbitrary control of citizens and strictly regulates it at the same time". The economy of dissent was based on reciprocity and trust in the individual. It was the germ of a principle and the search for resources which are not dependent on the control of monetary tools.
- Creation of parallel political structures and the promotion of their development. The alternative political structures must be incubated in the Parallel Polis and develop into a form which can replace the ruling authoritarian regime.
- Parallel foreign policy must be an instrument of the parallel society for the international stabilization and grounding of the movement and the search for financial and mental resources.

These patterns of the parallel structure are not a closed set; on the contrary, they occur on all fronts of the resistance against the authoritarian state. The aim of the Parallel Polis, according to Václav Havel, Ivan Martin Jirous, Milan Šimečky and other dissidents who discussed the concept, should be an independent society not oppressed by laws and decisions of representatives of public authorities—a society based on its own values, which are not forced by the central authorities.

== Use in cryptoanarchism ==
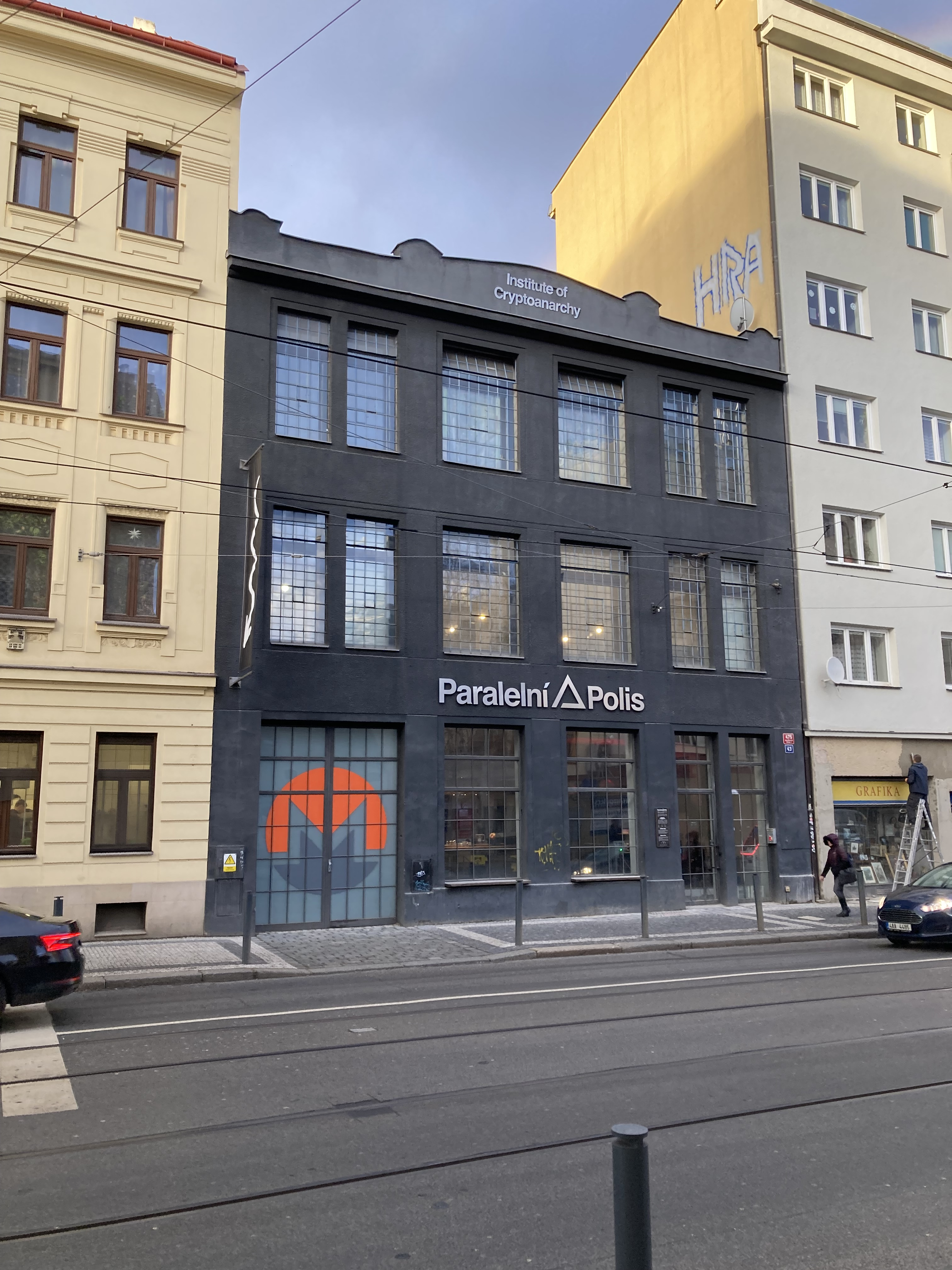
Parallel Polis, or the Institute of cryptoanarchy in Prague, 2024

The concept has been revived by scholars who met at the University of Washington and now work at other academic institutions. They posit that Benda's idea is being practiced on the Internet, which facilitates parallel institutions. In 2014, a physical space inspired by the idea opened in Prague's Holešovice district. Since then, individuals inspired by the idea have started a similar physical space in Bratislava, and further physical spaces are expected to open in Vienna and Barcelona. The venue serves as a think tank for individuals interested in ideas of innovation without a central authority. The goal is building parallel structures on a voluntary basis with an effort to remain state-free. The venues also operate as cafes that only accept cryptocurrency payments. The space gained media attention for acts of political activism, such as a boycott of Electronic record of sales in Czech Republic after it was put into effect, or after receiving a statement from the Czech National Bank prohibiting the use of the word "coin" for a symbolic metal coin connected to a virtual Bitcoin.

== See also ==
- Civil society
- Government in exile
- Prefigurative politics
- Shadow Cabinet
