= Edmonton-South =

Provincial electoral district in Alberta, Canada

Alberta electoral district
- Edmonton-South within the City of Edmonton (2017 boundaries).

Provincial electoral district
- Legislature: Legislative Assembly of Alberta
MLA
Rhiannon Hoyle
New Democratic
- District created: 1913
- District abolished: 1921
- District re-created: 2017
- First contested: 1913
- Last contested: 2023

Demographics
- Population (2016): 45,801
- Area (km²): 72.7
- Pop. density (per km²): 630

Edmonton-South (previously styled Edmonton South) is a provincial electoral district in Edmonton, Alberta, Canada. The first iteration was used for the 1913 and 1917 provincial elections. The district was re-created for the 30th Alberta general election.

== Geography ==
The first iteration of Edmonton South included the part of the city of Edmonton south of the North Saskatchewan River, formerly encompassed by the Strathcona district. Edmonton and Strathcona had recently been amalgamated.

The re-created Edmonton-South has the Whitemud Creek and Rabbit Hill Road as its western boundary, the Henday as its northern boundary (except the area between Rabbit Hill Road and the Whitemud Creek south of 23rd Ave NW), 91st St SW and 88 St SW as its eastern boundary, and extends South to Highway 19 on the west side of the QEII according to the City of Edmonton's plan to annex a portion of Leduc County.

== History ==
Members of the Legislative Assembly for Edmonton-South
Assembly	Years	Member	Party
See Strathcona 1905-1913
3rd	1913-1917	Herbert Crawford	Conservative
4th	1917-1921	Herbert Crawford	Conservative
See Edmonton 1921-1955
Riding created from Edmonton-South West, Edmonton-Whitemud, Edmonton-Ellerslie and Leduc-Beaumont
30th	2019–2021	Thomas Dang	New Democrat
30th	2021–2023	Thomas Dang	Independent
31st	2023–	Rhiannon Hoyle	New Democrat

Edmonton South was created when the district of Strathcona, centring on the old City of Strathcona, was renamed due to the city's merger with Edmonton.

The incumbent in 1913 was Alexander Rutherford, who had resigned as Premier of Alberta in 1910 but remained a Liberal MLA. He ran for re-election as a private member in the renamed Edmonton South, but was defeated by Conservative Herbert Crawford, a Whyte Avenue merchant. (A similar surprise occurred in southside Edmonton in 1989, when sitting premier Don Getty (MLA for Edmonton-Whitemud) was unseated by a Liberal challenger.)

Crawford was re-elected in 1917 to continue to serve as an opposition MLA. He beat out fellow Whyte Avenue merchant Robert Douglas, running as a Liberal. Prior to the 1921 election, Edmonton South merged with Edmonton West and Edmonton East to form the multi-member Edmonton constituency. Crawford ran but was not re-elected, placing ninth - five Liberals took the five seats.

In 2017, the Electoral Boundaries Commission decided to re-use the name Edmonton-South for a new district, carving it mostly from Edmonton-South West and smaller parts of Edmonton-Whitemud, Edmonton-Ellerslie, and Leduc-Beaumont.

== Election results ==
=== 1910s ===
1913 Alberta general election
Party	Candidate	Votes	%	±%
Conservative	Herbert Crawford	1,523	54.43%	+40.35%
Liberal	Alexander Rutherford	1,275	45.57%	-40.35%
Total valid votes		2,798		
Conservative notional gain		Swing		+40.35%
Source(s) Alberta Heritage Foundation. "Election Results, Edmonton South". Archived from the original on December 8, 2010.

1917 Alberta general election
Party	Candidate	Votes	%	±%
Conservative	Herbert Crawford	2,761	55.90%	+1.47%
Liberal	Robert Douglas	2,178	44.10%	-1.47%
Total valid votes		4,939		
Registered voters / Turnout		6,923	71.34%	
Conservative hold		Swing		+1.47%
Source(s) Alberta Heritage Foundation. "Election Results, Edmonton South". Archived from the original on December 8, 2010.

=== 2010s ===
Redistributed results, 2015 Alberta general election
New Democratic	6,706	53.69
Progressive Conservative	3,781	30.27
Wildrose	1,211	9.70
Liberal	514	4.12
Alberta Party	262	2.10
Green	9	0.07
Independent	7	0.06
Source(s) Source: Ridingbuilder

2019 Alberta general election
Party	Candidate	Votes	%	±%
New Democratic	Thomas Dang	10,673	46.63	-7.06
United Conservative	Tunde Obasan	9,881	43.17	+3.20
Alberta Party	Pramod Kumar	2,156	9.42	+2.10
Green	Ben Roach	180	0.79	+0.71
Total		22,890	99.10	–
Rejected, spoiled and declined		208	0.90	
Turnout		23,098	70.84	
Eligible electors		32,607		
New Democratic hold		Swing		-5.13
Source(s) Source: "42 - Edmonton-South, 2019 Alberta general election". officialresults.elections.ab.ca. Elections Alberta. Alberta. Chief Electoral Officer (2019). 2019 General Election. A Report of the Chief Electoral Officer. Volume II (PDF) (Report). Vol. 2. Edmonton, Alta.: Elections Alberta. pp. 164–167. ISBN 978-1-988620-12-1.

=== 2023 ===
2023 Alberta general election
Party	Candidate	Votes	%	±%
New Democratic	Rhiannon Hoyle	14,171	58.97	+12.34
United Conservative	Joseph Angeles	9,492	39.50	-3.67
Green	Chryssy Beckmann	369	1.54	+0.75
Total		24,032	99.28	–
Rejected and declined		174	0.72	
Turnout		24,206	60.12	
Eligible voters		40,262		
New Democratic hold		Swing		+8.00
Source(s) Source: Elections Alberta

== Nomination contests ==
UCP Edmonton-South nomination contest: December 11, 2022

Candidate
Candidate	Votes	%
Tunde Obasan	365	82.8
Karen Stix	76	17.2
Total	441	100.0

== See also ==
- List of Alberta provincial electoral districts
- Canadian provincial electoral districts
