= Herbert Crawford =

Canadian politician

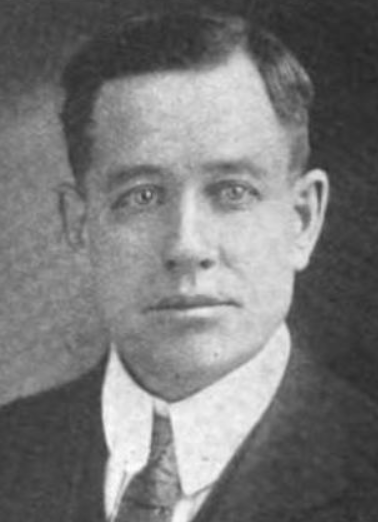

Member of the Legislative Assembly of Alberta
- In office 1913–1921
- Constituency: Edmonton South

Personal details
- Born: Herbert Howard Crawford; March 10, 1878 Brampton, Ontario
- Died: January 27, 1946 (aged 67) Edmonton, Alberta
- Political party: Progressive Conservative
- Occupation: Politician

Herbert Howard Crawford (March 10, 1878 – January 27, 1946) was a Strathcona businessman and a provincial level politician in Alberta, Canada. He served as a Conservative MLA from 1913 to 1921.

== Biography ==
He was born in Brampton, Ontario. He moved to Strathcona in 1900. One of his four sisters, Mary Crawford, also came west. An Edmonton high school teacher and unionist, she was a kingpin in Edmonton's progressive movement, running for political office again and again for the CCF albeit unsuccessfully.

After a couple years farming, Herbert Crawford ran a small but successful factory and auctioneer house in the Crawford Block at 8228 103rd Street, which is still standing today.

Crawford involved himself in Edmonton municipal politics, running to be public school board trustee in the December 1912 Edmonton Municipal Election. He was unsuccessful in his bid to win a seat, placing 6th out of 7 candidates (only three were elected).

Less than a year later in the 1913 Alberta general election Crawford ran in the new Edmonton South against former premier Alexander Cameron Rutherford. In a two-way race, Crawford defeated Rutherford by a substantial margin. The result was not expected.

When he ran for re-election in the 1917 Alberta general election. Crawford increased his margin of victory.

Edmonton South was abolished prior to the 1921 Alberta general election as the three Edmonton ridings were amalgamated into a city-wide constituency, electing five members under the block voting system. Crawford was unsuccessful, finishing 9th out of the field of 26 candidates, only five Liberals being elected. He attempted to regain a seat in the 1926 Alberta general election but again was substantially defeated, this time under the new Single Transferable Vote election system. Two more-popular Conservatives were elected instead.

He died at his home in Edmonton on January 27, 1946.

Legislative Assembly of Alberta
Preceded by Strathcona	MLA Edmonton South; 1913–1921	Succeeded by District Abolished
