= Scoundrels and Scallywags =

Scoundrels and Scallywags: Characters from Alberta's Past
- Author: Brian Brennan
- Language: English
- Publisher: Fifth House
- Publication date: 2002
- Publication place: Canada
- Pages: 216
- ISBN: 978-1548954710

Scoundrels and Scallywags: Characters from Alberta's Past, originally published in 2002 by Fifth House under ISBN 1-894004-92-2, is a book of short biographical profiles written by Irish-Canadian author Brian Brennan. It's a sequel to Building a Province: 60 Alberta Lives, which Brennan published in 2000, and Alberta Originals, which appeared in 2001.

Feature stories about the book appeared in the Calgary Herald, Edmonton Journal and Edmonton Sun

The book was on the Calgary Herald best-sellers list for nineteen weeks, rising to number one on the third week.

The featured individuals in the book include the following:

- John Rowand
- Henry Davis
- James Cornwall
- Thomas Bland Strange
- Isaac Barr
- Paddy Nolan
- Caroline Fulham
- William Sherman
- Bill Peyto
- Emilio Picariello
- Florence Lassandro
- Ernest Cashel
- Pearl Miller
- John Edward Brownlee
- Vivian MacMillan
- Guy Weadick
- Florence LaDue
- Robert "Streetcar" Brown Sr.
- Robert "Bobby" Brown Jr.
- Fred Speed
- Harold McMasters
- John Maloney
- Maurice King
- Harrold King
- Julia Kiniski
- James Audett
- Pete Jamieson
- Arthur Dyson
- Frank Cebuliak
- Donald Hugh Mackay
- Fred Perceval
- Richard Johnston
- Elizabeth Abbott
- John Kushner
- Elizabeth Hewes
- Bud Olson
- Tommy Common
- D'arcy Scott
- Dorothy Joudrie
- Toto Miller
- Owen Hart
