= Charles Orin Cunningham =

Canadian politician

Member of the Legislative Assembly of Alberta
- In office June 7, 1917 – July 18, 1921
- Preceded by: William Campbell
- Succeeded by: Percival Baker
- Constituency: Ponoka

Personal details
- Born: October 24, 1872
- Died: January 8, 1942 (aged 69)
- Party: Conservative
- Occupation: politician

Charles Orin Cunningham (October 24, 1872 – January 8, 1942) was a provincial politician from Alberta, Canada. He served as a member of the Legislative Assembly of Alberta from 1917 to 1921, sitting with the Conservative caucus in opposition.

== Political career ==
Cunningham ran for a seat to the Alberta Legislature in the 1917 Alberta general election as a Conservative candidate in the Ponoka electoral district. He won a straight fight over Liberal incumbent William Campbell to pick up the district for his party. The race was hotly contested with Cunningham finishing ahead of Campbell by 31 votes.

Cunnhingham did not seek a second term in office and retired at dissolution of the assembly in 1921.
