= Boomtime =

Boomtime may refer to:

- The day of the week in the Discordian calendar
- The book by James H. Gray
- The episode of the television documentary People's Century
- The track by the alternative rock band Amplifier
