= Ora B. Moore =

Canadian politician

Member of the Legislative Assembly of Alberta
- In office August 8, 1944 – August 4, 1952
- Preceded by: Percy McKelvey
- Succeeded by: Glen Johnston
- Constituency: Ponoka

Personal details
- Born: March 7, 1888 Moulton, Iowa
- Died: June 27, 1973 (aged 85)
- Party: Social Credit Party of Alberta
- Spouse: Erma Mayl Sutton (m. 1914)
- Children: Eight
- Education: Iowa State University
- Occupation: farmer; politician

Ora B. Moore (March 7, 1888 – June 27, 1973) was a provincial politician from Alberta, Canada. He served as a member of the Legislative Assembly of Alberta from 1944 to 1952, sitting as a Social Credit member from the constituency of Ponoka.

== Early life ==
Ora B. Moore was born March 7, 1888, in Moulton, Iowa, to John R. Moore and Laura Ada Short. Moore moved to Canada in 1913. Moore married Erma Mayl Sutton on December 8, 1909. Moore attended Iowa State University completing a B.S.A.

== Political career ==
Moore was elected in the 1944 Alberta general election to the 10th Alberta Legislature for the constituency of Ponoka as a member of the Social Credit Party. Moore received 52.1 per cent of the vote, defeating Co-operative Commonwealth candidate Ira D. Taylor with 24 per cent, Independent Neil W. Nelson with 18.4 per cent, and Labour-Progressive candidate R. G. Calwell with 5.6 per cent.

Moore was re-elected in the 1948 Alberta general election, receiving 63.5 per cent of the vote, defeating Co-operative Commonwealth candidate A. D. Olsen with 24.2 per cent, and Liberal Robert McLaren with 12.3 per cent.

== Later life ==
Moore died on June 27, 1973.

== Fonds ==
Ora B. Moore's fonds are held by the Provincial Archives of Alberta.
