= Halvar Jonson =

Canadian politician

Member of the Legislative Assembly of Alberta
- In office 1982–2004
- Preceded by: Don McCrimmon (Ponoka)
- Constituency: Ponoka (1982–1986); Ponoka-Rimbey (1993–2004)

Personal details
- Born: Halvar de la Cluyse Jonson; August 14, 1941 Athabasca, Alberta
- Died: December 2, 2016 (aged 75) Ponoka, Alberta
- Party: Progressive Conservative Association of Alberta
- Occupation: teacher

Halvar de la Cluyse Jonson (August 14, 1941 – December 2, 2016) was a teacher and high school principal. He was also a long serving provincial politician from Alberta, Canada. He served as a member of the Legislative Assembly of Alberta and cabinet minister in the provincial government from 1982 until 2004.

== Early life ==
Jonson was born in Athabasca, Alberta, Canada on August 14, 1941. He served as president of the Alberta Teachers' Association from 1976 until 1977.

== Political career ==
Jonson was first elected to the Alberta Legislature in the 1982 Alberta general election. He defeated Tom Butterfield from the Western Canada Concept and three other candidates to win his first term in office. His win held the Ponoka electoral district for the Progressive Conservatives. Due to redistribution of electoral district boundaries in the 1986 Alberta general election Ponoka was abolished and re-created as Ponoka-Rimbey. Jonson ran for his second term in the new electoral district and won easily defeating three other candidates. He stood for a third term in office in the 1989 Alberta general election fending off a strong challenge from Doug Hart of the New Democrats and one other candidate.

Jonson would see his popular vote grow in his bid for a fourth term for office in the 1993 Alberta general election. He was easily reelected defeating four other candidates. He would be returned for a fifth consecutive term. The race for the 1997 Alberta general election would see support build for second place Randy Jones of Social Credit. Jonson would see his popular support marginally drop but still win the electoral district by a wide margin. In the 2001 Alberta general election, Jonson would set a personal record for the largest plurality of his career. He would be returned to the Legislature in a landslide for his sixth and final term. Jonson retired at dissolution of the Legislature in 2004. His electoral district of Ponoka-Rimbey was abolished due to redistribution.

== Late life and legacy ==
In honour of Jonson's public service the provincial government renamed the brain injury ward of the Alberta Hospital Ponoka, the Halvar Jonson Centre for Brain Injury in Ponoka, Alberta In recognition of Jonson's work in championing legislation that led to the establishment of charter schools in Alberta, the Association of Alberta Public Charter Schools established the Halvar Jonson Award in 2012. The award is presented annually to those who have given of their time, energy, influence and expertise to enhance the success of charter schools in Alberta. Jonson died on December 2, 2016, at the age of 75.

Coat of arms of Halvar Jonson

Crest
A talbot passant Azure resting its dexter paw on a wild rose proper.
Escutcheon
Azure on a fess between three great horned owl heads Or, a boar passant Azure.
Motto
FORTIS IN RE, SUAVIS IN MODO

Legislative Assembly of Alberta
Preceded by Don McCrimmon	MLA Ponoka; 1982–1986	Succeeded by District Abolished
Preceded by New District	MLA Ponoka-Rimbey; 1993–2004	Succeeded by District Abolished
