= Henry Grattan Nolan =

The Honourable Henry Grattan Nolan CBE, MC
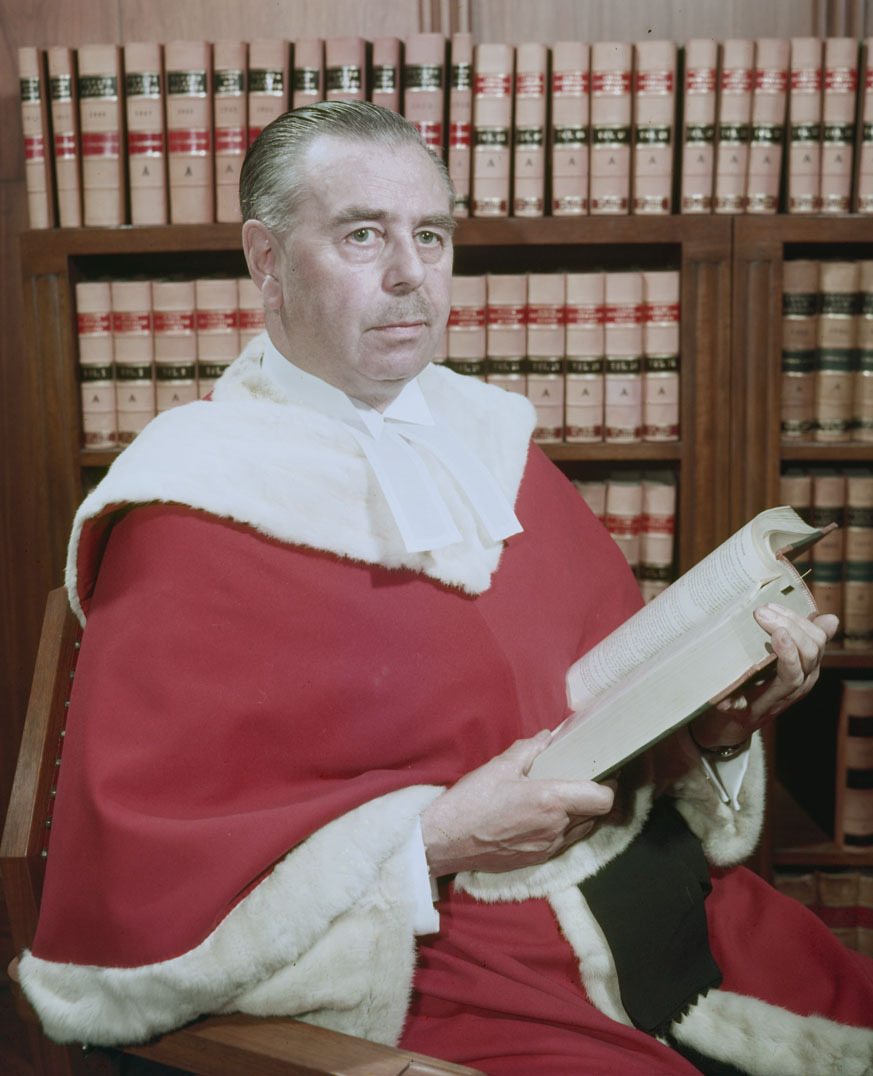
- Justice Nolan, c. 1956

Puisne Justice of the Supreme Court of Canada
- In office March 1, 1956 – July 8, 1957
- Nominated by: Louis St. Laurent
- Preceded by: James Wilfred Estey
- Succeeded by: Ronald Martland

Personal details
- Born: May 5, 1893 Calgary, Alberta
- Died: July 8, 1957 (aged 64)
- Relations: Paddy Nolan, father
- Awards: Order of the British Empire; Military Cross

Military service
- Rank: Brigadier
- Battles/wars: World War I World War II

Henry Grattan Nolan, CBE, MC (May 5, 1893 – July 8, 1957) was a Canadian lawyer and jurist. He was the first Albertan appointed to the Supreme Court of Canada.

== Biography ==
Nolan was born in Calgary, Northwest Territories (now in Alberta), the son of Patrick James "Paddy" Nolan, a criminal defence lawyer, and Mary Elizabeth Lee. According to his friend, Ronald Martland, who succeeded him on the Supreme Court, Nolan did not have a good relationship with his father, possibly because of his father's struggles with alcohol. Martland said that Nolan "very seldom ever spoke of his father", who had not treated Nolan's mother well. Nolan was determined not to follow the path set by his father. Nolan's wife stated that Nolan's father had not had any sort of relationship with Nolan, and had not even answered Nolan's schoolboy letters.

Nolan received a Bachelor of Arts degree from the University of Alberta in 1914 and was awarded a Rhodes scholarship for Alberta in 1915. However, he enlisted in the army during World War I and received a Military Cross in 1918 for his service. He was wounded at Cambrai, in France.

After the war, he received a second Bachelor of Arts in 1921 from University College, Oxford. He was called to the English and Alberta bars. He returned to Calgary to practice law, as an associate with the firm of Bennett, Hannah & Sanford, founded by Richard Bedford Bennett.

In 1928, he married Doris Margery McCarter. They had two daughters, Moira and Shelagh.

During World War II, he served with the Canadian Army, becoming a Vice-Judge Advocate General with the rank of brigadier. From 1945 to 1948, he was a prosecutor before the International Military Tribunal for the Far East at Tokyo. He was made a Commander of the Order of the British Empire in January 1946.

On March 1, 1956, he was appointed to the Supreme Court of Canada and served barely a year until his death in 1957 at the age of 64.

== See also ==
- List of justices of the Supreme Court of Canada
