= William A. Campbell (politician) =

Canadian politician

William Alexander Campbell
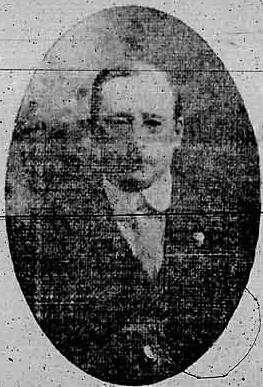

Member of the Legislative Assembly of Alberta
- In office March 22, 1909 – June 7, 1917
- Preceded by: John McLeod
- Succeeded by: Charles Cunningham
- Constituency: Ponoka

Personal details
- Born: March 31, 1873 Middlesex County, Ontario
- Died: September 6, 1934 (aged 61) Ponoka, Alberta
- Party: Liberal
- Occupation: politician

William Alexander Campbell (March 31, 1873 – September 6, 1934) was a provincial politician from Alberta, Canada. He served as a member of the Legislative Assembly of Alberta from 1909 to 1917 sitting with the Liberal caucus in government.

== Political career ==
Campbell was elected to the Alberta Legislature for the first time in the 1909 Alberta general election. He defeated Conservative candidate John Jackson by a comfortable plurality.

Campbell sought re-election again in the 1913 Alberta general election, where he defeated Independent candidate Percival Baker and Conservative candidate George Gordon in a hotly contested three-candidate election.

Charles Cunningham from the Conservative party defeated Campbell in his bid for a third term in office in the 1917 Alberta general election by a margin of 31 votes.

Baker and Campbell faced off again in the 1921 Alberta general election, were Campbell was again defeated.
