= Percy McKelvey =

Canadian politician

Member of the Legislative Assembly of Alberta
- In office 1940–1944
- Preceded by: Edith Rogers
- Succeeded by: Ora B. Moore
- Constituency: Ponoka

Personal details
- Born: November 25, 1896 Trail, British Columbia
- Died: January 2, 1986 (aged 89) Vancouver, British Columbia
- Party: None (Independent)
- Spouse: Mary Elizabeth Steadman
- Children: four
- Occupation: accountant, Imperial Oil agent

Percy Alexander McKelvey (November 25, 1896 – January 2, 1986) was a provincial politician from Alberta, Canada. He served as a member of the Legislative Assembly of Alberta from 1940 to 1944, as an "Independent" (People's League (Alberta)) MLA for the constituency of Ponoka.

He did not run for re-election in 1944.
