= Port Ryerse, Ontario =

Community of Norfolk County, Ontario, Canada

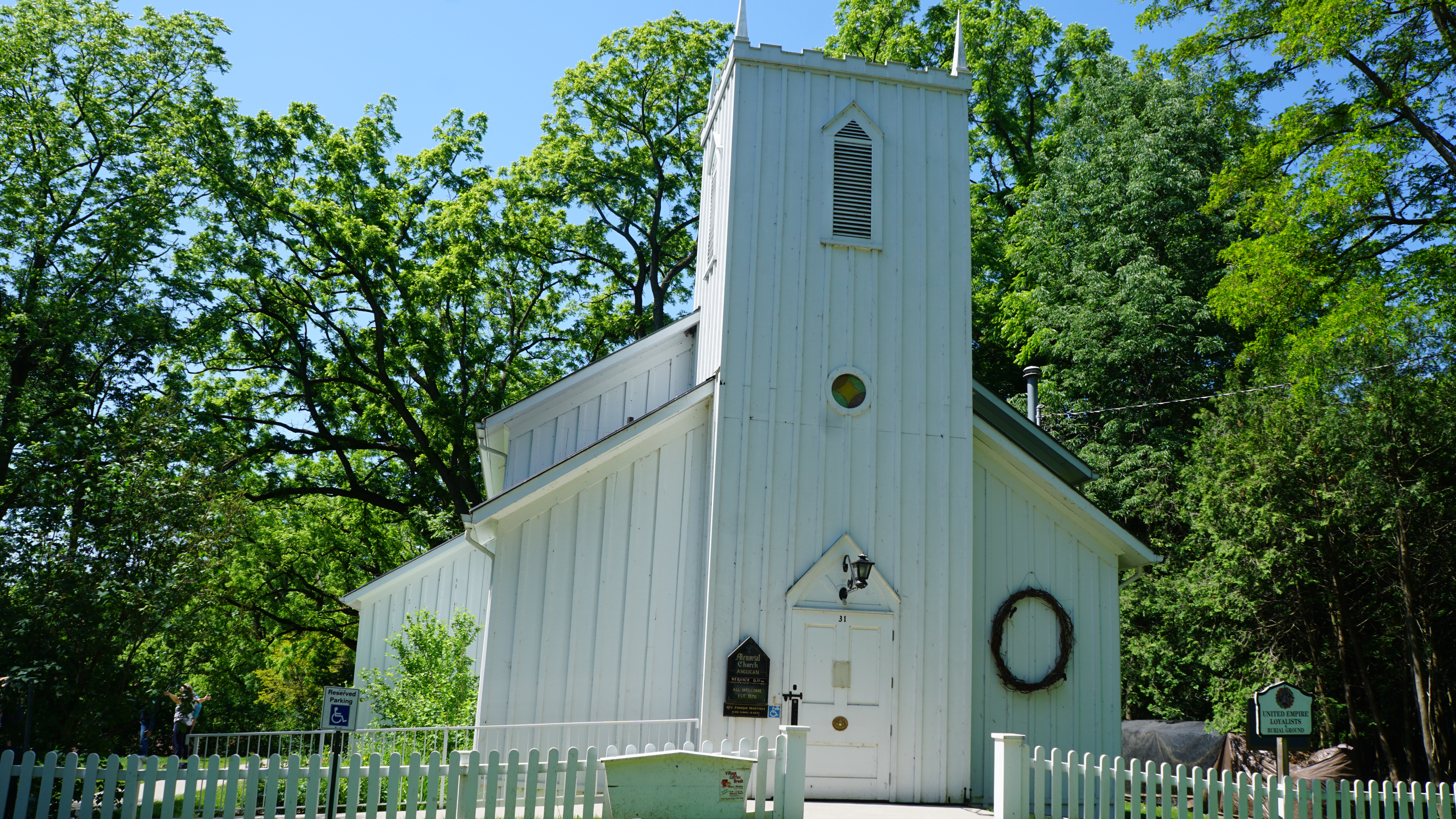
Memorial Anglican Church

Port Ryerse is a fishing hamlet in Norfolk County, Ontario, Canada, southwest of Port Dover. The hamlet is popular with persons from Southwestern Ontario who rent cottages and fish for pleasure during the summer months (Victoria Day through mid-October).

Many of the residents live here year-round. Most of the people here drive to Port Dover or Simcoe to purchase groceries and other goods, although there was a historic general store until September 2004, when it burned down. Handmade soap and bath shop and folk art shop still exist in the community.

This community lies at the mouth of Young's Creek (popular with trout fishermen) and empties into Long Point Bay. Nearby is Hay Creek Conservation Area, that can be used year-round and is suitable for hiking, walking, cycling cross-country skiing and snowshoeing.

== History ==
The hamlet was founded by Lieutenant-Colonel Samuel Ryerse, brother of Colonel Joseph Ryerson and uncle of Egerton Ryerson. Ryerse served with the New Jersey Volunteers and later commanded the 1st Norfolk Militia.

Its harbour was important for shipping cargo from Norfolk County across the lake; although its importance declined significantly sometime around the 1880s due to the advent of the railroad.

Samuel Ryerse was a United Empire Loyalist who fought with the British during the American Revolution and came to Upper Canada in 1794 where he received 3000 acres of land. He built a grist mill at the mouth of Young's Creek and a settlement grew up around it. Ryerse remained involved with the military as Lieutenant of the County of Norfolk and was also the chairman of the Court of Quarter Sessions.

The mill was burned by American troops in 1814 during the War of 1812. In later years, two new gristmills were built at the same location but both burned down (in 1860 and in 1890). A brick schoolhouse was built in 1871.

Port Ryerse is also the birthplace of John Edward Brownlee, who was the Premier of the province of Alberta during the Roaring Twenties and through the early years of the Great Depression. John Brownlee had one sister, Maude, born September 12, 1888. The Brownlees lived in the general store building, and it was here that John spent the happiest times of his childhood: he much preferred his parents' books, their political discussions with neighbours, and the details of their business to life outside the store. One anecdote has the village children, displeased with his serious temperament, throwing him into Lake Erie. By the age of seven, John was assisting at the store with such tasks as mixing butter from the different dairies with which his father dealt to produce a standardized blend.

A public elementary school called Port Ryerse School was located here that was in operation from the 19th century to the 1950s. Both Caucasian and African-Canadian students were photographed attending the school in the year 1898. The teacher shown in the 1898 school photograph was Miss A. Exelby and the picture was taken on September 14, 1898.

At least 194 different species of bird have been discovered here between 1875 and 2019; including the Passenger pigeon, the Indigo bunting, and the Northern cardinal.

In 2001, Haldimand-Norfolk was dissolved into two separate single-tier counties. Port Ryerse became part of the newly formed County of Norfolk.

=== Cemetery ===
The Memorial Anglican Church Cemetery is located in the hamlet; with at least 26 individuals or families buried here.

There are various traditional British surnames like Fletcher, Lawrence, Ryerse, Sells, and Stalker among those buried at this cemetery. The most recent burial in the Memorial Anglican Church Cemetery happens to be of Miss Sarah Fletcher (who died in 1880). Lieut-Colonel Samuel Vanderhoff Ryerse Sr. was the oldest known male to be buried in this cemetery (died in 1812) while the oldest known female to be buried at this cemetery is Sarah Ryerse (née Underhill; died in 1838 in her 81st year).

== Climate ==
From the late 1990s onwards, winters have become more mild due to changes in climate brought on by global warming. Port Ryerse traditionally belongs to the humid continental climate zone, even with the recent mild winters and warmer dry summers. Like in all communities, towns, and cities throughout the world, global warming due to human industrial activity has drastically altered the climate of Port Ryerse throughout the decades.

Should the sea levels rise by 60 metres or 200 feet, Port Ryerse would not be affected by flooding. However, it may be affected by droughts as a by-product of the dislocation of available fresh water and may be forced to rely on desalinated salt water piped in from the Eastern United States. Constructing the proper infrastructure to carry the water hundreds of miles away would take considerable manpower along with significant economic costs and an unprecedented level of cooperation from multiple federal, state/provincial, and municipal governments.

== Bibliography ==
- Foster, Franklin L. (1981). John E. Brownlee: A Biography. Lloydminster, Alberta: Foster Learning Inc. ISBN 978-1-55220-004-9.
