= Ponoka-Rimbey =

Defunct provincial electoral district in Alberta, Canada

Alberta electoral district

Defunct provincial electoral district
- Legislature: Legislative Assembly of Alberta
- District created: 1986
- District abolished: 2004
- First contested: 1986
- Last contested: 2001

Ponoka-Rimbey was a provincial electoral district in Alberta, Canada, mandated to return a single member to the Legislative Assembly of Alberta using the first past the post method of voting from 1986 to 2004.

Ponoka-Rimby is named for the towns of Ponka and Rimbey.

== Members of the Legislative Assembly (MLAs) ==
Members of the Legislative Assembly for Ponoka-Rimbey
Assembly	Years	Member	Party
See Ponoka electoral district from 1905-1986
21st	1986–1989	Halvar Jonson	Progressive Conservative
22nd	1989–1993	Halvar Jonson	Progressive Conservative
23rd	1993–1997	Halvar Jonson	Progressive Conservative
24th	1997–2001	Halvar Jonson	Progressive Conservative
25th	2001–2004	Halvar Jonson	Progressive Conservative
See Lacombe-Ponoka electoral district from 2004-Present

== Electoral history ==
=== 1986 ===
1986 Alberta general election
Party	Candidate	Votes	%	±%
Progressive Conservative	Halvar Jonson	3,601	62.20%	–
New Democratic	Pat Byers	1,138	19.66%	–
Western Canada Concept	Warren Bloomquist	701	12.11%	–
Liberal	Mel H. Buffalo	349	6.03%	–
Total		5,789	–	–
Rejected, spoiled and declined		25	–	–
Eligible electors / turnout		12,334	47.14%	–
Progressive Conservative pickup new district.				
Source(s) Source: "Ponoka-Rimbey Official Results 1986 Alberta general election". Alberta Heritage Community Foundation.

=== 1989 ===
1989 Alberta general election
Party	Candidate	Votes	%	±%
Progressive Conservative	Halvar Jonson	3,729	60.11%	-2.10%
New Democratic	Doug Hart	1,667	26.87%	7.21%
Liberal	Ervan Stobbe	808	13.02%	7.00%
Total		6,204	–	–
Rejected, spoiled and declined		31	–	–
Eligible electors / turnout		12,314	50.63%	–
Progressive Conservative hold		Swing		-4.65%
Source(s) Source: "Ponoka-Rimbey Official Results 1989 Alberta general election". Alberta Heritage Community Foundation.

=== 1993 ===
1993 Alberta general election
Party	Candidate	Votes	%	±%
Progressive Conservative	Halvar Jonson	5,977	63.65%	3.55%
Liberal	Bernice Luce	1,841	19.61%	6.58%
New Democratic	Doug Hart	747	7.96%	-18.91%
Confederation of Regions	Harold Kenney	585	6.23%	–
Independent	Robert (Bob) Hodgins	240	2.56%	–
Total		9,390	–	–
Rejected, spoiled and declined		26	–	–
Eligible electors / turnout		14,279	65.94%	–
Progressive Conservative hold		Swing		5.41%
Source(s) Source: "Ponoka-Rimbey Official Results 1993 Alberta general election". Alberta Heritage Community Foundation.

=== 1997 ===
1997 Alberta general election
Party	Candidate	Votes	%	±%
Progressive Conservative	Halvar Jonson	5,750	64.03%	0.38%
Social Credit	Randy Jones	1,439	16.02%	–
Liberal	Joshua Phillpotts	912	10.16%	-9.45%
New Democratic	Liz Wetheral	879	9.79%	1.83%
Total		8,980	–	–
Rejected, spoiled and declined		34	–	–
Eligible electors / turnout		14,884	60.56%	–
Progressive Conservative hold		Swing		1.98%
Source(s) Source: "Ponoka-Rimbey Official Results 1997 Alberta general election". Alberta Heritage Community Foundation.

=== 2001 ===
2001 Alberta general election
Party	Candidate	Votes	%	±%
Progressive Conservative	Halvar Jonson	6,797	72.07%	8.04%
Liberal	Tim Falkiner	1,296	13.74%	3.59%
Independent	Charles Park	764	8.10%	–
New Democratic	Linda Roth	574	6.09%	-3.70%
Total		9,431	–	–
Rejected, spoiled and declined		26	–	–
Eligible electors / turnout		16,158	58.53%	–
Progressive Conservative hold		Swing		5.16%
Source(s) Source: "Ponoka-Rimbey Official Results 2001 Alberta general election". Alberta Heritage Community Foundation.

== See also ==
- List of Alberta provincial electoral districts
- Canadian provincial electoral districts
