= Don McCrimmon =

Canadian politician (1918–1992)

Donald "Don" James McCrimmon

Member of the Legislative Assembly of Alberta
- In office August 30, 1971 – November 2, 1982
- Preceded by: Neville Roper
- Succeeded by: Halvar Jonson
- Constituency: Ponoka

Minister without portfolio responsible for native affairs
- In office March 1979 – November 1982
- Preceded by: Robert Bogle
- Succeeded by: Milt Pahl

Personal details
- Born: March 1, 1918 Red Deer, Alberta
- Died: November 8, 1992 (aged 74)
- Party: Progressive Conservative

Donald James McCrimmon (March 1, 1918 – November 8, 1992) was a provincial level politician from Alberta, Canada. He served as a member of the Legislative Assembly of Alberta from 1971 to 1982 sitting with the governing Progressive Conservative caucus. During his time in office McCrimmon was appointed by Premier Peter Lougheed to serve a term in the Executive Council of Alberta as a Minister without portfolio responsible for native affairs from 1979 to 1982.

== Political career ==
McCrimmon ran for a seat to the Alberta Legislature in the 1971 Alberta general election. He won the electoral district of Ponoka defeating incumbent Neville Roper in a hotly contested four way race. His win helped the Progressive Conservative caucus form government that year.

The 1975 Alberta general election would see McCrimmon run against two challengers. He was returned easily to his second term after winning a slightly higher popular vote while the opposition vote would remain unchanged. McCrimmon would stand for a third term in office in the 1979 Alberta general election. His popular vote would remain almost unchanged from the 1975 election while his opponents would make gains but the vote was heavily divided.

After the election Premier Peter Lougheed appointed McCrimmon to the Executive Council of Alberta as Minister without portfolio responsible for Native Affairs. He held that portfolio until he retired from the Assembly at dissolution in 1982.
