= Ponoka (provincial electoral district) =

Defunct provincial electoral district in Alberta, Canada

Coordinates: 52.695°N 113.580°W

Alberta electoral district

Defunct provincial electoral district
- Legislature: Legislative Assembly of Alberta
- District created: 1905
- District abolished: 1986
- First contested: 1905
- Last contested: 1982

Ponoka was a provincial electoral district in Alberta, Canada, mandated to return a single member to the Legislative Assembly of Alberta from 1905 to 1986.

== History ==
Ponoka was one of the original 25 electoral districts contested in the 1905 Alberta general election upon Alberta becoming a province in September 1905. The district was redrawn frequently over the years but remained largely a thin slice in central Alberta. The electoral district was named for the town of Ponoka in central Alberta.

From 1924 to 1956, the district used instant-runoff voting to elect its MLA.

Ponoka was dissolved in the 1986 electoral district re-distribution to form the Ponoka-Rimbey electoral district.

=== Members of the Legislative Assembly (MLAs) ===
Members of the Legislative Assembly for Ponoka
| Assembly | Years | Member | Party |
|---|---|---|---|
| 1st | 1905–1909 | John R. McLeod | Liberal |
| 2nd | 1909–1913 | William A. Campbell | Liberal |
| 3rd | 1913–1917 | William A. Campbell | Liberal |
| 4th | 1917–1921 | Charles Orin Cunningham | Conservative |
| 5th | 1921–1921 | Percival Baker | United Farmers |
| 5th | 1921–1926 | John Edward Brownlee | United Farmers |
| 6th | 1926–1930 | John Edward Brownlee | United Farmers |
| 7th | 1930–1935 | John Edward Brownlee | United Farmers |
| 8th | 1935–1940 | Edith Rogers | Social Credit |
| 9th | 1940–1944 | Percy McKelvey | Independent |
| 10th | 1944–1948 | Ora B. Moore | Social Credit |
| 11th | 1948–1952 | Ora B. Moore | Social Credit |
| 12th | 1952–1955 | Glen F. Johnston | Social Credit |
| 13th | 1955–1959 | Glen F. Johnston | Social Credit |
| 14th | 1959–1963 | Glen F. Johnston | Social Credit |
| 15th | 1963–1967 | Glen F. Johnston | Social Credit |
| 16th | 1967–1971 | Neville S. Roper | Social Credit |
| 17th | 1971–1975 | Donald J. McCrimmon | Progressive Conservative |
| 18th | 1975–1979 | Donald J. McCrimmon | Progressive Conservative |
| 19th | 1979–1982 | Donald J. McCrimmon | Progressive Conservative |
| 20th | 1982–1986 | Halvar C. Jonson | Progressive Conservative |
See Ponoka-Rimbey electoral district from 1986–2004

== Election results ==
=== 1905 ===
1905 Alberta general election
| Party | Candidate | Votes | % | ±% |
|---|---|---|---|---|
| Liberal | John R. McLeod | 375 | 58.59% | – |
| Conservative | John A. Jackson | 265 | 41.41% | – |
| Total | | 640 | – | – |
| Rejected, spoiled and declined | | N/A | – | – |
| Eligible electors / turnout | | 640 | N/A | – |
| Liberal pickup new district. | | | | |
Source(s) Source: "Ponoka Official Results 1905 Alberta general election". Alberta Heritage Community Foundation.

=== 1909 ===
1909 Alberta general election
| Party | Candidate | Votes | % | ±% |
|---|---|---|---|---|
| Liberal | William A. Campbell | 466 | 67.05% | 8.46% |
| Conservative | John A. Jackson | 229 | 32.95% | -8.46% |
| Total | | 695 | – | – |
| Rejected, spoiled and declined | | N/A | – | – |
| Eligible electors / turnout | | 1,026 | 67.74% | – |
| Liberal hold | | Swing | | 8.46% |
Source(s) Source: "Ponoka Official Results 1909 Alberta general election". Alberta Heritage Community Foundation.

=== 1913 ===
1913 Alberta general election
| Party | Candidate | Votes | % | ±% |
|---|---|---|---|---|
| Liberal | William A. Campbell | 485 | 51.65% | -15.40% |
| Conservative | George Gordon | 257 | 27.37% | -5.58% |
| Independent | Percival Baker | 197 | 20.98% | – |
| Total | | 939 | – | – |
| Rejected, spoiled and declined | | N/A | – | – |
| Eligible electors / turnout | | N/A | N/A | – |
| Liberal hold | | Swing | | -4.91% |
Source(s) Source: "Ponoka Official Results 1913 Alberta general election". Alberta Heritage Community Foundation.

=== 1917 ===
1917 Alberta general election
| Party | Candidate | Votes | % | ±% |
|---|---|---|---|---|
| Conservative | Charles Orin Cunningham | 888 | 50.89% | 23.52% |
| Liberal | William A. Campbell | 857 | 49.11% | -2.54% |
| Total | | 1,745 | – | – |
| Rejected, spoiled and declined | | N/A | – | – |
| Eligible electors / turnout | | N/A | N/A | – |
| Conservative gain from Liberal | | Swing | | -11.25% |
Source(s) Source: "Ponoka Official Results 1917 Alberta general election". Alberta Heritage Community Foundation.

=== 1921 ===
1921 Alberta general election
| Party | Candidate | Votes | % | ±% |
|---|---|---|---|---|
| United Farmers | Percival Baker | 1,391 | 63.06% | – |
| Liberal | William A. Campbell | 815 | 36.94% | -12.17% |
| Total | | 2,206 | – | – |
| Rejected, spoiled and declined | | N/A | – | – |
| Eligible electors / turnout | | N/A | N/A | – |
| United Farmers gain from Conservative | | Swing | | 12.17% |
Source(s) Source: "Ponoka Official Results 1921 Alberta general election". Alberta Heritage Community Foundation.

=== 1921 by-election ===
Alberta provincial by-election, December 9, 1921 Following the death of Percival Baker on July 19, 1921.
| Party | Candidate | Votes | % | ±% |
|---|---|---|---|---|
| United Farmers | John Edward Brownlee | Acclaimed | – | – |
| Total | | – | – | – |
| United Farmers hold | | Swing | | – |
Source(s) Mardon 107

=== 1926 ===
1926 Alberta general election
| Party | Candidate | Votes | % | ±% |
|---|---|---|---|---|
| United Farmers | John Edward Brownlee | 1,357 | 62.91% | -0.14% |
| Liberal | Marcus Crandall | 453 | 21.00% | -15.94% |
| Conservative | Arthur Beaumont | 347 | 16.09% | – |
| Total | | 2,157 | – | – |
| Rejected, spoiled and declined | | N/A | – | – |
| Eligible electors / turnout | | 3,207 | 67.26% | – |
| United Farmers hold | | Swing | | 7.90% |
Source(s) Source: "Ponoka Official Results 1926 Alberta general election". Alberta Heritage Community Foundation. See Mardon 107

=== 1930 ===
1930 Alberta general election
| Party | Candidate | Votes | % | ±% |
|---|---|---|---|---|
| United Farmers | John Edward Brownlee | Acclaimed | – | – |
| Total | | N/A | – | – |
| Rejected, spoiled and declined | | N/A | – | – |
| Eligible electors / turnout | | N/A | N/A | – |
| United Farmers hold | | Swing | | N/A |
Source(s) Source: "Ponoka Official Results 1930 Alberta general election". Alberta Heritage Community Foundation. See Mardon 107

=== 1935 ===
1935 Alberta general election
| Party | Candidate | Votes | % | ±% |
|---|---|---|---|---|
| Social Credit | Edith Rogers | 2,295 | 59.30% | – |
| United Farmers | John Edward Brownlee | 879 | 22.71% | – |
| Liberal | Robert McLaren | 696 | 17.98% | – |
| Total | | 3,870 | – | – |
| Rejected, spoiled and declined | | N/A | – | – |
| Eligible electors / turnout | | 4,559 | 84.89% | – |
| Social Credit gain from United Farmers | | Swing | | N/A |
Source(s) Source: "Ponoka Official Results 1935 Alberta general election". Alberta Heritage Community Foundation.

=== 1940 ===
Percy McKelvey was a candidate for the People's League.

1940 Alberta general election
| Party | Candidate | Votes | % | ±% |
|---|---|---|---|---|
First count
| Independent | Percy A. McKelvey | 1,920 | 43.62% | – |
| Social Credit | Edith Rogers | 1,907 | 43.32% | -15.98% |
| Co-operative Commonwealth | Charles Aldo Johnson | 575 | 13.06% | – |
| Total | | 4,402 | – | – |
Ballot transfer results
| Independent | Percy A. McKelvey | 2,234 | 52.21% | – |
| Social Credit | Edith Rogers | 2,045 | 47.79% | – |
| Total | | 4,279 | – | – |
| Rejected, spoiled and declined | | 121 | – | – |
| Eligible electors / turnout | | 6,053 | 74.72% | -10.17% |
| Independent gain from Social Credit | | Swing | | N/A |
Source(s) Source: "Ponoka Official Results 1940 Alberta general election". Alberta Heritage Community Foundation.

=== 1944 ===
1944 Alberta general election
| Party | Candidate | Votes | % | ±% |
|---|---|---|---|---|
| Social Credit | Ora B. Moore | 2,208 | 52.09% | 8.47% |
| Co-operative Commonwealth | Ira D. Taylor | 1,016 | 23.97% | 10.91% |
| Independent | Neil W. Nelson | 778 | 18.35% | – |
| Labor-Progressive | R. G. Calwell | 237 | 5.59% | – |
| Total | | 4,239 | – | – |
| Rejected, spoiled and declined | | 107 | – | – |
| Eligible electors / turnout | | 5,964 | 72.87% | -1.83% |
| Social Credit gain from Independent | | Swing | | 12.90% |
Source(s) Source: "Ponoka Official Results 1944 Alberta general election". Alberta Heritage Community Foundation.

=== 1948 ===
1948 Alberta general election
| Party | Candidate | Votes | % | ±% |
|---|---|---|---|---|
| Social Credit | Ora B. Moore | 2,679 | 63.47% | 11.38% |
| Co-operative Commonwealth | A. D. Olsen | 1,023 | 24.24% | 0.27% |
| Liberal | Robert McLaren | 519 | 12.30% | – |
| Total | | 4,221 | – | – |
| Rejected, spoiled and declined | | 241 | – | – |
| Eligible electors / turnout | | 6,408 | 69.63% | -3.24% |
| Social Credit hold | | Swing | | N/A |
Source(s) Source: "Ponoka Official Results 1948 Alberta general election". Alberta Heritage Community Foundation.

=== 1952 ===
1952 Alberta general election
| Party | Candidate | Votes | % | ±% |
|---|---|---|---|---|
| Social Credit | Glen F. Johnston | 2,377 | 54.13% | -9.33% |
| Liberal | Howard L. Larson | 1,214 | 27.65% | 15.35% |
| Co-operative Commonwealth | Carroll J. Wenaas | 800 | 18.22% | -6.02% |
| Total | | 4,391 | – | – |
| Rejected, spoiled and declined | | 298 | – | – |
| Eligible electors / turnout | | 6,635 | 70.67% | 1.04% |
| Social Credit hold | | Swing | | -6.37% |
Source(s) Source: "Ponoka Official Results 1952 Alberta general election". Alberta Heritage Community Foundation.

=== 1955 ===
1955 Alberta general election
| Party | Candidate | Votes | % | ±% |
|---|---|---|---|---|
First count
| Social Credit | Glen F. Johnston | 2,254 | 49.12% | -5.01% |
| Liberal | Clinton Reed | 1,323 | 28.83% | 2.18% |
| Co-operative Commonwealth | J. W. Lee | 698 | 15.21% | -3.01% |
| Conservative | W. E. Chiles | 184 | 4.01% | – |
| Independent | C. Kenyon | 130 | 2.83% | – |
| Total | | 4,904 | – | – |
Ballot transfer results
| Social Credit | Glen F. Johnston | 2,320 | 51.69% | – |
| Liberal | Clinton Reed | 1,417 | 31.57% | – |
| Co-operative Commonwealth | J. W. Lee | 751 | 16.73% | – |
| Total | | 4,488 | – | – |
| Rejected, spoiled and declined | | 315 | – | – |
| Eligible electors / turnout | | 6,876 | 71.32% | 0.65% |
| Social Credit hold | | Swing | | N/A |
Source(s) Source: "Ponoka Official Results 1955 Alberta general election". Alberta Heritage Community Foundation.

=== 1959 ===
1959 Alberta general election
| Party | Candidate | Votes | % | ±% |
|---|---|---|---|---|
| Social Credit | Glen F. Johnston | 2,406 | 50.18% | 1.06% |
| Progressive Conservative | Ivor E. Davies | 1,529 | 31.89% | – |
| Liberal | Erwin E. Schultz | 860 | 17.94% | -10.89% |
| Total | | 4,795 | – | – |
| Rejected, spoiled and declined | | 29 | – | – |
| Eligible electors / turnout | | 6,751 | 71.46% | 0.14% |
| Social Credit hold | | Swing | | N/A |
Source(s) Source: "Ponoka Official Results 1959 Alberta general election". Alberta Heritage Community Foundation.

=== 1963 ===
1963 Alberta general election
| Party | Candidate | Votes | % | ±% |
|---|---|---|---|---|
| Social Credit | Glen F. Johnston | 1,830 | 44.90% | -5.28% |
| Independent Social Credit | Neville S. Roper | 1,721 | 42.22% | -7.95% |
| Independent | George F. Sharp | 525 | 12.88% | – |
| Total | | 4,076 | – | – |
| Rejected, spoiled and declined | | 31 | – | – |
| Eligible electors / turnout | | 7,563 | 54.30% | -17.15% |
| Social Credit hold | | Swing | | -7.81% |
Source(s) Source: "Ponoka Official Results 1963 Alberta general election". Alberta Heritage Community Foundation.

=== 1967 ===
1967 Alberta general election
| Party | Candidate | Votes | % | ±% |
|---|---|---|---|---|
| Social Credit | Neville S. Roper | 3,286 | 62.42% | -24.70% |
| New Democratic | Ed Nelson | 1,464 | 27.81% | – |
| Liberal | Derek R. Broughton | 514 | 9.76% | – |
| Total | | 5,264 | – | – |
| Rejected, spoiled and declined | | 33 | – | – |
| Eligible electors / turnout | | 8,181 | 64.75% | 10.44% |
| Social Credit hold | | Swing | | 15.97% |
Source(s) Source: "Ponoka Official Results 1967 Alberta general election". Alberta Heritage Community Foundation.

=== 1971 ===
1971 Alberta general election
| Party | Candidate | Votes | % | ±% |
|---|---|---|---|---|
| Progressive Conservative | Donald J. McCrimmon | 2,712 | 44.12% | – |
| Social Credit | Neville S. Roper | 2,695 | 43.84% | -18.58% |
| New Democratic | Ed Nelson | 598 | 9.73% | -18.08% |
| Liberal | Bernice Luce | 142 | 2.31% | -7.45% |
| Total | | 6,147 | – | – |
| Rejected, spoiled and declined | | 22 | – | – |
| Eligible electors / turnout | | 8,426 | 73.21% | 8.47% |
| Progressive Conservative gain from Social Credit | | Swing | | -17.17% |
Source(s) Source: "Ponoka Official Results 1971 Alberta general election". Alberta Heritage Community Foundation.

=== 1975 ===
1975 Alberta general election
| Party | Candidate | Votes | % | ±% |
|---|---|---|---|---|
| Progressive Conservative | Donald J. McCrimmon | 3,328 | 60.26% | 16.14% |
| Social Credit | Alvin Goetz | 1,263 | 22.87% | -20.97% |
| New Democratic | Boug Lier | 932 | 16.87% | 7.15% |
| Total | | 5,523 | – | – |
| Rejected, spoiled and declined | | 61 | – | – |
| Eligible electors / turnout | | 9,024 | 61.88% | -11.33% |
| Progressive Conservative hold | | Swing | | 18.56% |
Source(s) Source: "Ponoka Official Results 1975 Alberta general election". Alberta Heritage Community Foundation.

=== 1979 ===
1979 Alberta general election
| Party | Candidate | Votes | % | ±% |
|---|---|---|---|---|
| Progressive Conservative | Donald J. McCrimmon | 3,317 | 50.53% | -9.73% |
| Social Credit | Roy Kinley | 1,856 | 28.27% | 5.40% |
| New Democratic | Bruce A. Beck | 1,279 | 19.48% | 2.61% |
| Liberal | Gus Itzek | 113 | 1.72% | – |
| Total | | 6,565 | – | – |
| Rejected, spoiled and declined | | N/A | – | – |
| Eligible electors / turnout | | 10,222 | 64.22% | 2.34% |
| Progressive Conservative hold | | Swing | | -7.57% |
Source(s) Source: "Ponoka Official Results 1979 Alberta general election". Alberta Heritage Community Foundation.

=== 1982 ===
1982 Alberta general election
| Party | Candidate | Votes | % | ±% |
|---|---|---|---|---|
| Progressive Conservative | Halvar C. Jonson | 4,031 | 50.76% | 0.23% |
| Western Canada Concept | Tom Butterfield | 2,646 | 33.32% | – |
| New Democratic | C.W. (Bill) Loov | 876 | 11.03% | -8.45% |
| Reform | Paul M. Bateman | 235 | 2.96% | – |
| Independent | Eric Ostergaard | 154 | 1.94% | – |
| Total | | 7,942 | – | – |
| Rejected, spoiled and declined | | 16 | – | – |
| Eligible electors / turnout | | 11,032 | 72.14% | 7.91% |
| Progressive Conservative hold | | Swing | | -2.41% |
Source(s) Source: "Ponoka Official Results 1982 Alberta general election". Alberta Heritage Community Foundation.

== Plebiscite results ==
=== 1957 liquor plebiscite ===
1957 Alberta liquor plebiscite results: Ponoka
Question A: Do you approve additional types of outlets for the sale of beer, wine and spirituous liquor subject to a local vote?
| Ballot choice | Votes | % |
| No | 1,500 | 53.96% |
| Yes | 1,280 | 46.04% |
| Total votes | 2,780 | 100% |
| Rejected, spoiled and declined | 53 | |
6,317 eligible electors, turnout 44.88%

On October 30, 1957, a stand-alone plebiscite was held province wide in all 50 of the then current provincial electoral districts in Alberta. The government decided to consult Alberta voters to decide on liquor sales and mixed drinking after a divisive debate in the Legislature. The plebiscite was intended to deal with the growing demand for reforming supposedly antiquated liquor control laws.

The plebiscite was conducted in two parts. Question A asked in all districts, asked the voters if the sale of liquor should be expanded in Alberta, while Question B asked in a handful of districts within the corporate limits of Calgary and Edmonton asked if men and woman were allowed to drink together in establishments.

Province wide Question A of the plebiscite passed in 33 of the 50 districts while Question B passed in all five districts. Ponoka voted against the proposal by a comfortable margin. The voter turnout in the district was just slightly below the province wide average of 46%.

Official district returns were released to the public on December 31, 1957. The Social Credit government in power at the time did not considered the results binding. However the results of the vote led the government to repeal all existing liquor legislation and introduce an entirely new Liquor Act.

Municipal districts lying inside electoral districts that voted against the Plebiscite such as Ponoka were designated Local Option Zones by the Alberta Liquor Control Board and considered effective dry zones, business owners that wanted a licence had to petition for a binding municipal plebiscite in order to be granted a licence.

== See also ==
- List of Alberta provincial electoral districts
- Canadian provincial electoral districts
