= John Edward Brownlee =

Fifth Premier of Alberta, Canada (1883–1961)

The Honourable John Edward Brownlee QC
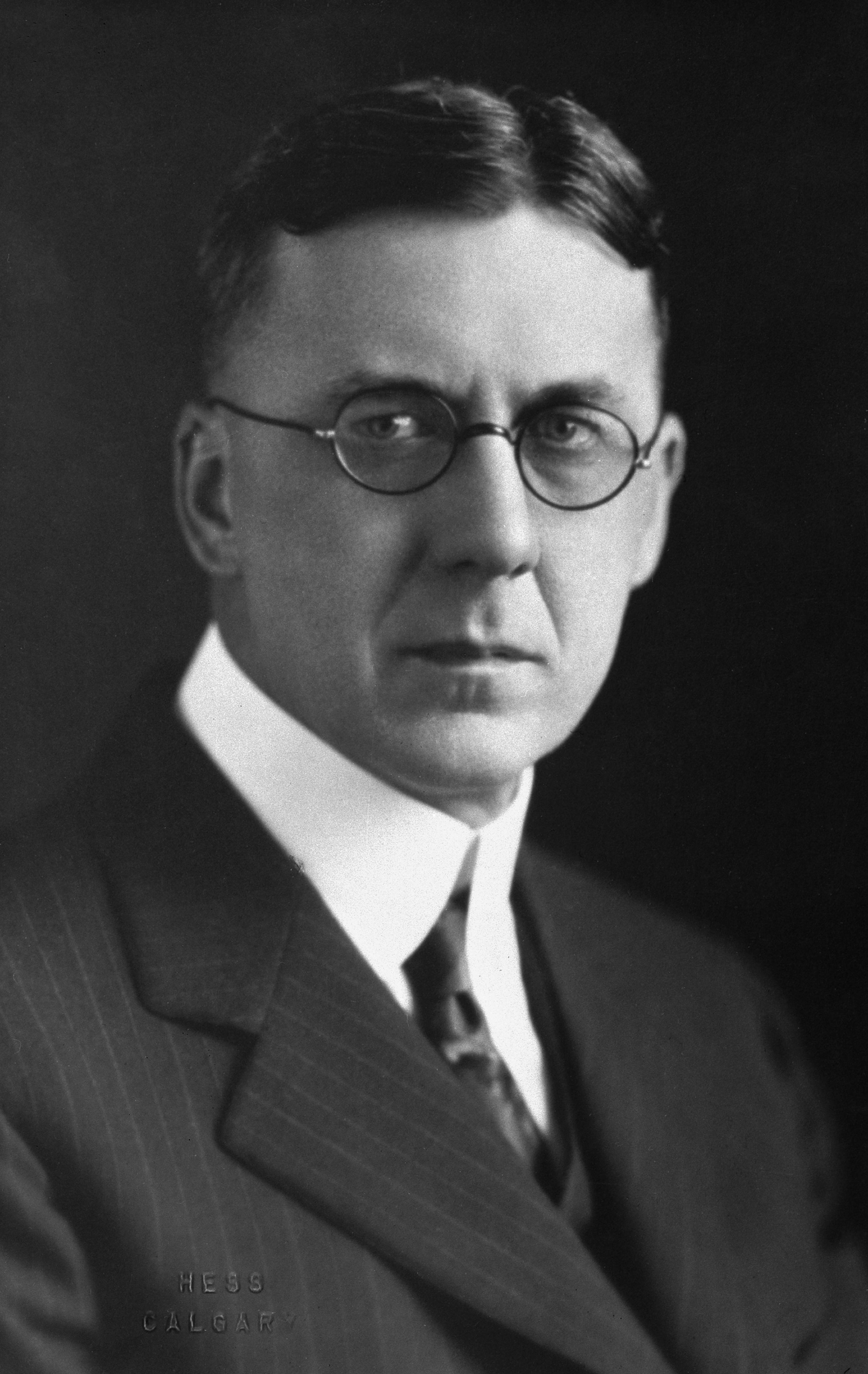
- Brownlee in 1930

5th Premier of Alberta
- In office November 23, 1925 – July 10, 1934
- Monarch: George V
- Lieutenant Governor: William Egbert; William L. Walsh
- Preceded by: Herbert Greenfield
- Succeeded by: Richard G. Reid

Attorney General of Alberta
- In office August 31, 1921 – June 5, 1926
- Premier: Herbert Greenfield; Himself
- Preceded by: John R. Boyle
- Succeeded by: John Lymburn

Provincial Secretary of Alberta
- In office June 15, 1926 – July 10, 1934
- Premier: Himself
- Preceded by: George Hoadley
- Succeeded by: Richard G. Reid
- In office November 3, 1923 – November 23, 1925
- Premier: Herbert Greenfield
- Preceded by: Herbert Greenfield
- Succeeded by: George Hoadley

Member of the Legislative Assembly for Ponoka
- In office December 9, 1921 – August 22, 1935
- Preceded by: Percival Baker
- Succeeded by: Edith Rogers

Personal details
- Born: August 27, 1883 Port Ryerse, Ontario, Canada
- Died: July 15, 1961 (aged 77) Calgary, Alberta, Canada
- Party: United Farmers of Alberta
- Spouse: Florence Edy
- Children: 2
- Education: University of Toronto
- Occupation: Politician; lawyer

John Edward Brownlee QC (August 27, 1883 – July 15, 1961) was the fifth premier of Alberta, serving from 1925 until 1934. Born in Port Ryerse, Ontario, he studied history and political science at the University of Toronto's Victoria College before moving west to Calgary to become a lawyer. His clients included the United Farmers of Alberta (UFA); through his connection with that lobby group, he was involved in founding the United Grain Growers (UGG).

After the UFA entered electoral politics and won the 1921 election, new premier Herbert Greenfield asked Brownlee to serve as his attorney-general. Brownlee agreed and was elected to the Legislative Assembly of Alberta in a by-election in the riding of Ponoka. As attorney-general, he was an important member of Greenfield's government. He was closely involved in its most important activities, including efforts to better the lot of farmers living in Alberta's drought-ridden south, divest itself of money-losing railways, and win jurisdiction over natural resources from the federal government. When a group of UFA backbenchers grew frustrated with Greenfield's weak leadership, they asked Brownlee to replace him. Brownlee eventually agreed, and became premier in 1925.

Brownlee enjoyed early success as premier: he handily won the 1926 election, signed an agreement with the federal government transferring control over Alberta's natural resources to its provincial government, sold the struggling government railways to the Canadian National and Canadian Pacific railway companies, and ran a series of balanced budgets. Things became more difficult with the advent of the Great Depression. Brownlee was unable to restore the province to prosperity in the face of a global economic crisis, and reluctantly ran budget deficits. Political radicalism increased, and Brownlee found his orthodox approach to political economy under attack.

In 1934, Vivian MacMillan, a family friend, accused Brownlee of seduction. Her father sued Brownlee under Alberta's Seduction Act. He denied any sexual relationship, but a jury found in MacMillan's favour. The judge disregarded the jury's verdict, but the trial's lurid testimony and the stigma resulting from the jury's finding caused Brownlee to resign as premier.

He ran for re-election in Ponoka in the 1935 provincial election but was unsuccessful, as William Aberhart's Social Credit League was elected to a massive majority in the Legislature that year. Once out of politics, Brownlee resumed the practice of law and joined the management of the UGG, serving as its president and general manager from 1948 until shortly before his death in 1961.

== Early life ==
=== Childhood ===
John Edward Brownlee was born August 27, 1883, (Note: This is the date on his birth certificate, baptismal certificate, school records, and marriage license, though sources from later than 1921 generally give the date as being one year later.) in Port Ryerse, Ontario, to William "Bill" James Brownlee (1856–1934) and Christina Brownlee (née Shaw; c. 1860–1941). He was named for his maternal grandfather, miller John Shaw, and paternal grandfather, carpenter Edward James Brownlee. Christina Brownlee was a former school mistress and William James Brownlee was the operator of the Port Ryerse general store. John Brownlee had one sister, Maude, born September 12, 1888. The Brownlees lived in the general store building, and it was here that John spent the happiest times of his childhood: he much preferred his parents' books, their political discussions with neighbours, and the details of their business to life outside the store. One anecdote has the village children, displeased with his serious temperament, throwing him into Lake Erie. By the age of seven, John was assisting at the store with such tasks as mixing butter from the different dairies with which his father dealt to produce a standardized blend.

By the end of the 1880s, Port Ryerse was dying out. The advent of railways was making tiny lake ports obsolete, and in Port Ryerse's case this obsolescence was hastened by the town mill burning down in August 1890. Against this backdrop, the family moved to Bradshaw, in Lambton County. There, John began school and attended Sunday school at the village's Methodist church. He was the only pupil at his tiny school not from a farm; he later claimed that this exposure to farmers gave him an early understanding of their concerns. He also became involved with his church's young people's club, which put on speaking programs. He was by nature shy, serious, and introverted, which made these programs a challenge at first; however, he found that he was able to succeed at them through focus and discipline.

In September 1897, Brownlee began high school. The closest high school was in Sarnia, too distant for a daily commute, so at the age of fourteen Brownlee boarded away from his family, seeing them only during holidays and occasional weekends. He was a good student—described by his instructors as "diligent", if not brilliant—but was not a social success, being too studious for many of his peers. He wrote his departmental examinations in July 1900 and graduated shortly thereafter.

=== Early professional career ===
After graduating high school, Brownlee travelled with his father on a sales trip through northern Ontario, and otherwise assisted with the operation of the family business. His family expected him to become a teacher and, in September 1901, just after his eighteenth birthday, he enrolled at Sarnia Model School. (Note: Model schools were variants of normal schools that allowed graduates to teach only in the county in which the model school was situated. They were implemented in Ontario to address the teacher shortage at the turn of the twentieth century. (Foster (1981) 8–9)) There, Brownlee completed a fifteen-week program that included such subjects as school management, pedagogy, school law, reading instruction, and hygiene. He graduated December 12, 1901, second in his twenty-person class, and within a month was one of two teachers at Bradshaw's school.

He fast gained a reputation as a competent instructor: his old work ethic served him well, and his seriousness, cool blue-grey eyes, and six foot four frame combined to give him an impressive presence. His $400 per year salary did not satisfy his ambition, and in the spring of 1904, after two and a half years on the job, he decided that he wanted a university education. His teaching salary was not sufficient to finance this, so he spent the summer of 1904 selling a one volume encyclopaedia in the newly settled areas around Rapid City, Manitoba. Besides providing him with the income he required—he was a patient, effective salesman and later boasted that he was never thrown off of a farm—the job gave the now 21-year-old Brownlee his first glimpse of Western Canada. Returning to Ontario at the summer's end, he enrolled at Victoria College at the University of Toronto.

=== University ===
In Toronto, Brownlee pursued an honours program with specializations in history and political science. Besides these chosen subjects, he was required to study mathematics, biology, English literature, composition, Latin, and two additional languages—despite having some knowledge of French, he chose German and Hebrew. He continued his trend of diligent scholarship, and earned As in all subjects his first year except for Latin, German, and mathematics, in which he received Bs. The trend continued, and in his third year he was among the top five in his class in all subjects except economics, in which he was eighth. As he became more involved in extracurricular pursuits, these grades fell; after his fourth and final year, he graduated with III Class Honours, leaving him out of the top tier of students. His professors included historian George Wrong, whom Brownlee held in high esteem.

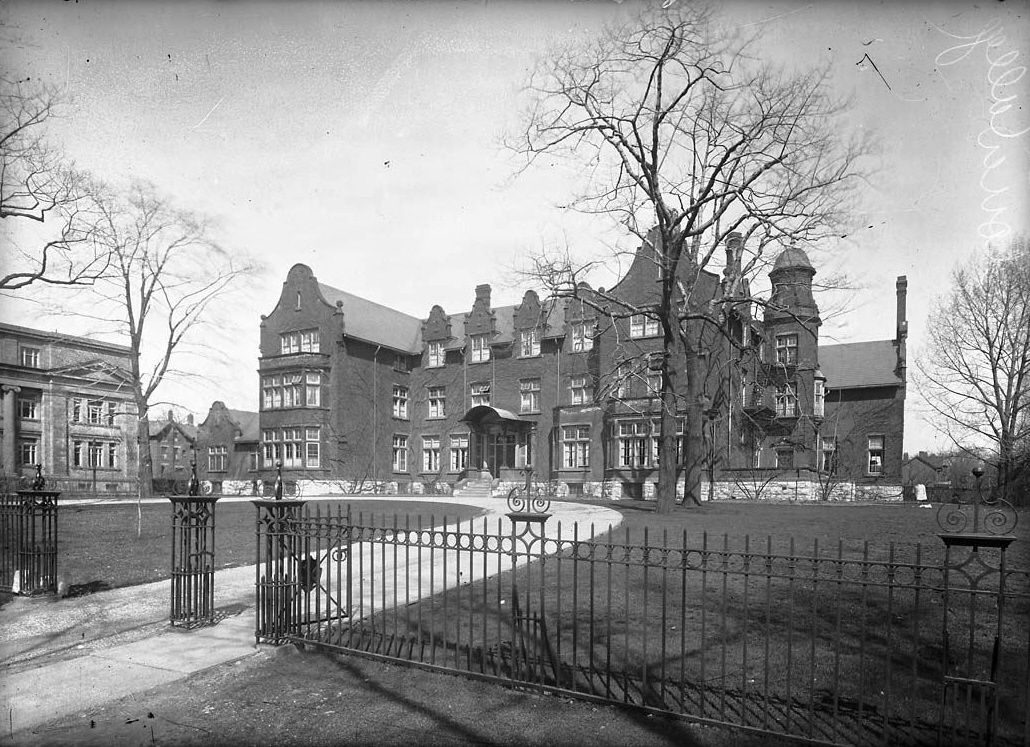
Victoria College as it appeared in the 1930s

Brownlee was involved in a wide array of extracurricular pursuits. Chief among these were the Union Literary Society (dubbed "the Lit"), Acta Victoriana (the college's literary journal), and "the Bob" (a satirical revue). The first of these allowed him to hone his skills at formal debate; he earned a reputation as "one of the more effective although not the most dramatic of speakers". In his involvement with the journal, he developed his business skills: in his second year he was named assistant business manager, and he was promoted to business manager in his fourth year. His financial management of Acta Victoriana, along with that of the college glee club (for which he also served as business manager during his fourth year, organizing a ten-day tour of the Niagara region), earned him accolades. For the Bob, Brownlee temporarily abandoned his seriousness to write skits poking fun at the college and his classmates; these won good reviews, with the Acta Victoriana declaring the 1908 edition, which Brownlee headed, "one of the best ever". The summer following his third year, he attended the Conference of College Young Men's Associations at Niagara-on-the-Lake, where he attended Bible study classes and heard guest speakers encourage him to pursue a career in the clergy.

Brownlee's summers in university were spent selling stereoscopic viewers in England and magazine subscriptions in Toronto. He also derived a salary in his fourth year as business manager of the Acta Victoriana. These sources of income allowed him to rent a small room in a private home, and to subscribe to a meal plan at a local eatery for Can$2.50 per week.

=== Family ===
During Brownlee's convocation in 1908, he sneaked off to go canoeing in the Humber River with a female classmate, Isabella Govenlock. Upon their return, they announced that they were engaged. The news stunned friends of both, none of whom was aware of any romance between the two; moreover, the apparent spontaneity of the engagement seemed at odds with Brownlee's reputation for seriousness and caution. The engagement did not last, and the following winter Brownlee met and began to court Florence Edy, an arts student at McMaster College. In the summer of 1909, Edy moved with her family to Calgary; Brownlee, for a combination of personal and professional reasons, soon followed. The pair was married December 23, 1912, at the Toronto home of Edy's sister Blanche. A honeymoon trip back to Calgary via Chicago followed.

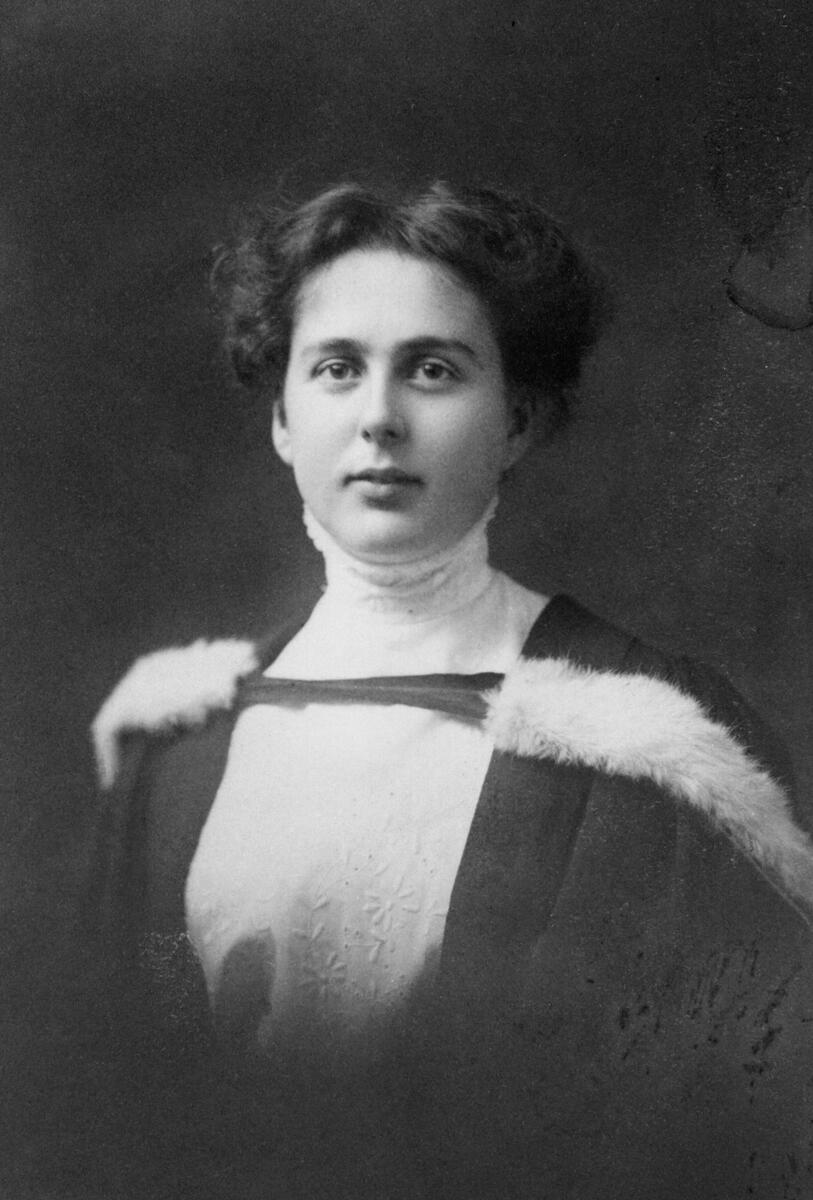
Florence Edy in 1909

Brownlee and his wife had two sons: John Edy Brownlee was born December 1915, and Alan Marshall Brownlee was born September 1917. Florence's pregnancy with Alan, combined with a bout of poor health before it, made her a virtual invalid in subsequent years. This was exacerbated by the 1919 birth and death in infancy of a daughter. Also in 1919, Brownlee visited his family in Ontario; he returned to Alberta with his sister, Maude, who assisted Florence with the care of her children. Soon after, a full-time maid was hired.

While John Brownlee relished life in Alberta, Florence missed her friends and family in Ontario. Her own health was only made worse by worry about her sons: John was perpetually nervous, and Alan was high-strung and sickly. It did not help that, beginning in 1921, her husband spent the work week in Edmonton, commuting home to Calgary only for the weekends. This situation continued until 1923, when the family moved to Edmonton's Garneau region. In 1926, on the way home from a visit east, Florence Brownlee and her sons were examined at the Mayo Clinic, where all three were given clean bills of health; Florence in particular was advised to "resume a more active life".

Although Brownlee's public image was of a severe and humourless technocrat, in private he allowed himself some levity. Christmas morning 1923, the Brownlee boys awoke to find footprints of coal dust leading from the fireplace to the stairs and a handwritten note from Santa Claus apologizing for the mess and explaining that he had been searching for one of his reindeer. It transpired that he had mistaken one of Florence's feet, emerging from the covers at the foot of her bed, for an antler. On another occasion, Brownlee reacted to his sons' displeasure at leaving his parents' cat in Ontario by acquiring a large bloodhound, which he himself came to enjoy.

== Legal career ==
=== Early career ===
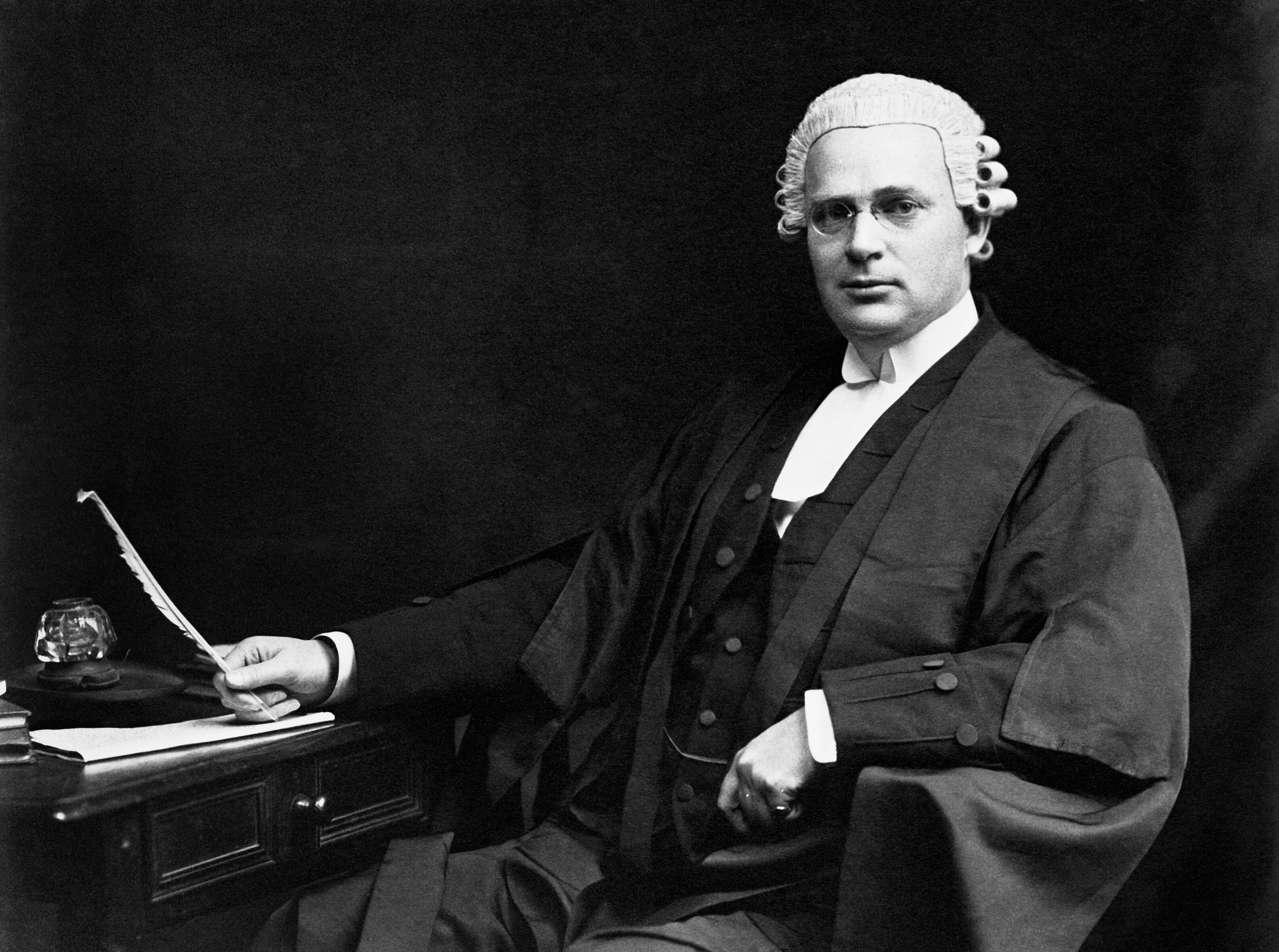
As an articling clerk, Brownlee became close to future Canadian Prime Minister R. B. Bennett.

At the time of Brownlee's graduation from Victoria College, the path of entry to his chosen profession, law, was through three years of articling instead of law school. Brownlee and Victoria classmate Fred Albright resolved to go west; after narrowing the choice to either Calgary or Vancouver, the former was selected on the basis that its legal community was less established, and it offered better prospects to young lawyers without significant capital. There, Brownlee was articled to Lougheed, Bennett, Allison & McLaws, whose partners included Sir James Lougheed and R. B. Bennett. Brownlee became quite close to Bennett; the future Prime Minister often visited him after hours while Brownlee was studying, and used his honed memory and impressive oratorical skills to give the younger man detailed lectures on whatever area of law he was reading about, illustrated by precise and invariably accurate references to cases. Despite his relationship with Bennett, Brownlee was dissatisfied with the work he was being given, and he moved to Muir, Jephson and Adams, where he hoped to practice more commercial law. There he benefited from the tutelage of James Muir, who spent hours finding precise citations relevant to Brownlee's studies, and then left the casebooks open to the appropriate page for Brownlee to find the next morning.

On December 16, 1912, Brownlee was called to the Alberta Bar. He began work as an associate with Muir, Jephson and Adams; in 1914 he was made partner. He took advantage of his membership in Victoria College's newly founded Calgary alumni branch to build professional connections. On the outbreak of World War I, Brownlee did not enlist; his biographer, Lakeland College historian Franklin Foster, speculates that this may have been because of his eyesight, but notes that he did not involve himself in patriotic fundraising or volunteer work and questions whether he "completely shared the values and ideals of his generation".

=== Farmers' lawyer ===
One of Muir, Jephson and Adams' major clients was a new agricultural lobby organization called the United Farmers of Alberta (UFA), and it was with this group that Brownlee began to work most closely. Among his first tasks for the UFA was to assist with the creation of a province-wide farmer-owned company to own and operate the province's grain elevators. Early in 1913, he was part of a delegation to lobby the provincial government of Arthur Sifton to grant a charter to such a company; Sifton was cognizant of the political power of the UFA, and quickly incorporated the Alberta Farmers' Cooperative Elevator Company (AFCEC) Limited, but refused the farmers' request to guarantee bank loans to the new company. These guarantees were instead received from the Grain Growers' Grain Company (GGG), a Manitoba-based equivalent of the AFCEC.

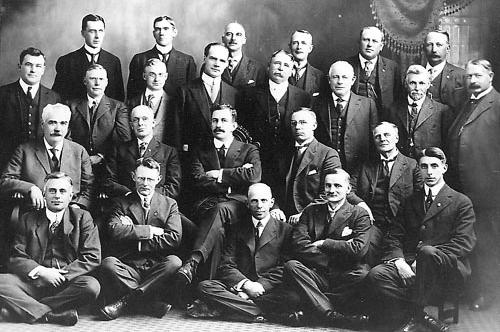
The directors of the United Grain Growers in October 1916. Brownlee is standing in the back row at left.

Brownlee became the AFCEC's lawyer, and in that capacity dealt with lawsuits against the company alleging incompetence on the part of its general manager and fraud on the part of a former auditor. His most important work for the AFCEC, however, was in merging it with the GGG to form the United Grain Growers (UGG). In 1916, new AFCEC president Cecil Rice-Jones began to advocate the amalgamation of western Canada's farmer-controlled grain elevator companies. The Saskatchewan Co-operative Elevator Company was uninterested, leaving the AFCEC and the GGG as the two potential partners. After accompanying Rice-Jones to a meeting with Alberta Public Works Minister Charles Stewart, Brownlee initially found himself in agreement with Stewart's belief that the companies' shareholders would not accept amalgamation, and that a holding company should instead be created to run both companies' affairs. After further study, however, he changed his mind and pursued the amalgamation with his typical focus. He reviewed the two companies' corporate charters, and found that the GGG's prevented it from either selling out to another company or acquiring sufficient capitalization to buy out the AFCEC. The charter could only be amended by the Parliament of Canada, and the GGG was concerned that any request for amendment would lead eastern Canadian financial interests to successfully lobby for a weakening of farmers' rights. A meeting of both companies' boards at the GGG's Winnipeg offices nevertheless reached the reluctant conclusion that such a request was necessary for amalgamation. Though Brownlee continued to fear resistance from shareholders, both companies' annual general meetings approved the proposal. Brownlee played an active role in both meetings by fielding questions from shareholders about legal ramifications and by serving on ad hoc subcommittees to study aspects of the proposal. Once the proposal was approved, he drew up the necessary agreements, bylaws, stock certificates, and other instruments. The UGG came into existence September 1, 1917.

As lawyer for the UGG, Brownlee sympathized with the prevailing farmers' view that eastern Canadian business leaders were hostile to their interests. (For example, when the UGG wanted to sell binder twine, no manufacturer would supply it). He recommended that the UGG reduce farmers' reliance on the eastern establishment by expanding its operations into insurance, investment, and real estate. The result was the United Grain Growers Securities Ltd. He also helped the UGG quietly sell the stock it held in the Home Bank of Canada when UGG directors began to doubt the bank's soundness; this subtlety was considered essential, as the directors were concerned that airing their doubts publicly would make the bank's failure a self-fulfilling prophecy. When UGG Assistant General Manager J. R. Murray found an interested buyer, Brownlee advised Murray against insisting on an intricate written sales contract for fear that the buyer would sense the directors' concerns. His advice was heeded, and the sale was concluded December 29, 1919. The bank failed less than four years later.

In July 1919 Brownlee left Muir, Jephson and Adams to accept a full-time position with the UGG at $6,000 per year. Several months later this was increased to $7,500 in view of his increased responsibilities as General Manager of UGG Securities. In 1922, he was made King's Counsel. Brownlee was doing well in both law and business, and expected to continue doing so for the foreseeable future.

=== UFA and politicization ===
Though most of his legal work was for the AFCEC and then the UGG, Brownlee also made contact with leaders of the UFA proper, including William Irvine, Irene Parlby, Herbert Greenfield, and, most importantly, Henry Wise Wood. The charismatic Wood was the UFA's president, and Brownlee often accompanied him to speaking engagements at UFA locals across Alberta in 1919 and 1920. Wood held audiences enraptured with his sermons on cooperation and social justice—Brownlee at one point likened the UFA to a religion—while Brownlee explained the services offered by the UFA's central office and answered members' legal questions. His trips with Wood aroused Brownlee's interest in the political side of the farmers' movement, which he began to study in greater detail.

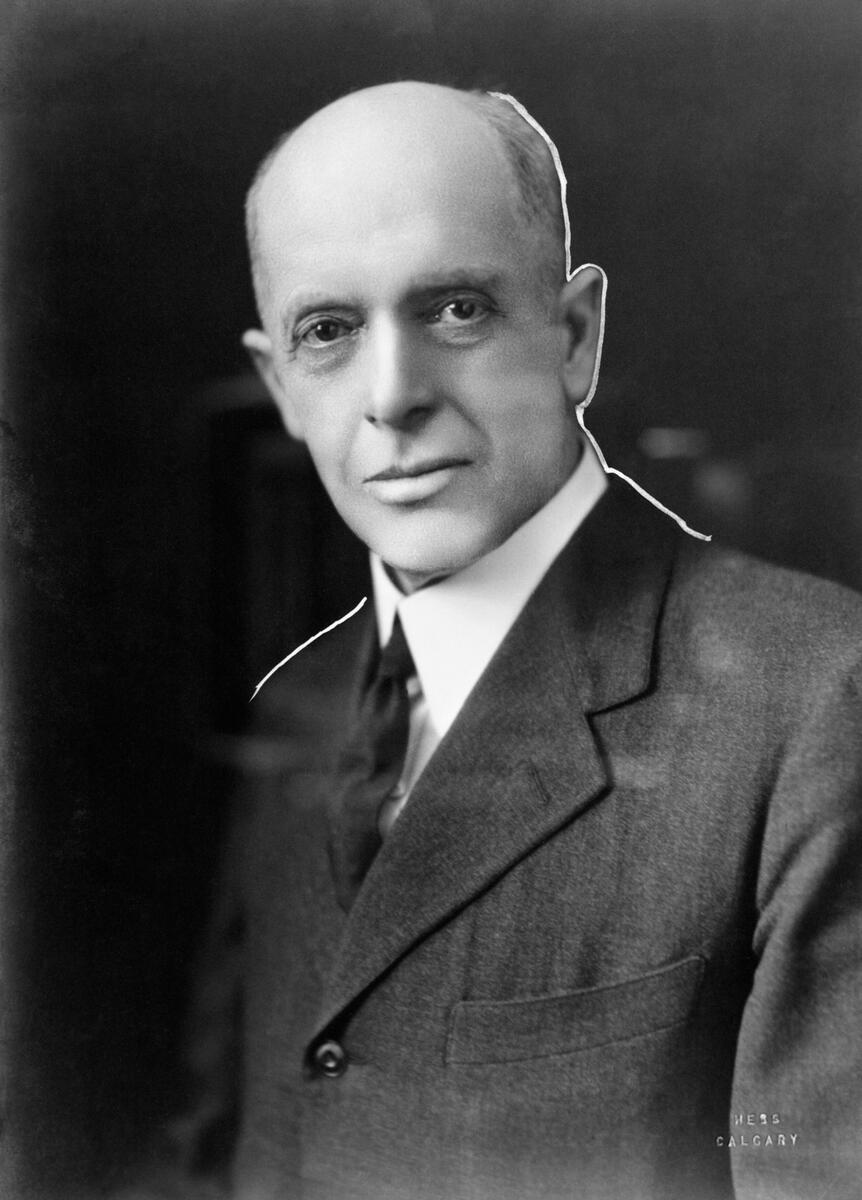
Henry Wise Wood's influence on Brownlee's life would be profound.

Another of Brownlee's contacts was T. A. Crerar, who had recently become leader of the Progressive Party of Canada, and it was to him that Brownlee turned for his political education. Crerar introduced Brownlee to Ernest Charles Drury, the newly elected United Farmers of Ontario Premier of Ontario, and arranged for a meeting between Brownlee and Charles Stewart, by now Alberta Premier. During the latter meeting, Brownlee told Stewart that he felt that the UFA's desires could be accommodated within Stewart's Liberal government but warned against a quick election. Foster suggests that this strategic advice from a political neophyte offended Stewart. Whether this is true or not, Stewart did call a quick election, for July 1921. The UFA had decided in January 1919, against Woods' wishes, that it would run candidates in the next election.

Before the provincial election, a federal by-election was held in June 1921 in Medicine Hat. Crerar's Progressives were running Robert Gardiner, a local farmer, and Crerar asked Wood and Greenfield (the Vice President of the UFA) to broker an alliance between farmers and labour in the mixed rural-urban riding. Before that effort came to fruition, the federal government of Conservative Arthur Meighen disclosed allegations of irregularities in the management of some of the UGG's elevators. At a hearing on June 4, former employees testified of storage bins with false bottoms and bribed railway employees. These allegations involved events from 1912 until 1914, and some in the UFA said they suspected that the sudden emergence of these charges in 1921 indicated political motives. Brownlee, as the UGG's attorney, obtained an injunction against further hearings until the UGG had time to conduct its own investigation and, as importantly, until the Medicine Hat by-election was over. Gardiner won by a wide margin.

While most of the UFA was preparing for the 1921 provincial election, Brownlee went on vacation in Victoria for a month. Despite his recent interest in politics, he still viewed himself as a lawyer and businessman with little role to play in the UFA's electoral activities. Before leaving Calgary, Wood told him that the UFA would not win more than 20 of the Legislative Assembly of Alberta's 61 seats. In fact, it won 38, a majority of the Legislture. Brownlee watched the results come in at the offices of the Victoria Colonist.

The UFA, not a political party in the conventional sense, had contested the election without a leader. Its control of the majority of seats in the legislature entitled it, under the conventions of the Westminster parliamentary system, to form the government, but it was not decided who would be Premier. Wood was the natural choice, but he declined the job for several reasons. To Brownlee's surprise, Wood proposed that he should become premier instead. Brownlee declined, surmising that many of the newly elected farmer-politicians would have seen an urban lawyer in the premier's office as a repudiation of much of what they stood for. Ultimately, Greenfield was selected to be premier.

== Attorney-General ==
Greenfield appointed Brownlee his attorney-general, and soon after Brownlee was acclaimed in a by-election in Ponoka. His training in business and law, unique in the UFA caucus, gave him a central role in most of the government's initiatives. He also led the defence against attacks by the Liberal opposition, and eventually became responsible for setting the agenda for cabinet meetings.

Brownlee quickly entrenched himself in the conservative wing of the UFA caucus. He resisted measures that would take decision-making out of government departments and transfer them to the caucus or UFA locals, and opposed the efforts of some UFA backbenchers to transform the application of the Westminster system in Alberta. When the UFA's more radical elements called for the creation of a government-owned bank, Brownlee dismissed the idea as neither financially nor constitutionally feasible. (The Alberta Treasury Branches, established in the 1930s, proved that Alberta constitutionally could have a provincial bank.)

Brownlee's concern for the government's finances extended to its budget deficit; when he found Greenfield's spending cuts wanting, he cut staff from his own department to set an example. In a further attempt to better the government's financial position, he unsuccessfully advocated the sale of its four money-losing railways to Canadian National (CPR) or Canadian Pacific (CPR).

A longstanding objective of the Alberta government had been winning control of Alberta's lands and natural resources from the federal government. The older provinces already had this control, but when Alberta, Saskatchewan, and Manitoba were admitted to Confederation, the federal government retained resource rights and paid the provincial governments an annual grant as compensation. As attorney-general, Brownlee was Alberta's chief negotiator in these efforts, and met frequently with representatives of Liberal Prime Minister William Lyon Mackenzie King. While negotiations occasionally seemed promising, King was unwilling to fully commit to the transfer, possibly because Charles Stewart, now King's Alberta lieutenant, and John R. Boyle, leader of the provincial Liberals, were sworn enemies of the UFA.

As a farmers' government, the UFA was committed to helping farmers in the province's drought-stricken south. Brownlee authored the Drought Relief Act, which created a Drought Relief Commissioner to provide farmers with financial counselling and help them reach settlements with banks when they were unable to pay their debts. He also played a leading role in the creation of the Alberta Wheat Pool.

Brownlee's department was responsible for administration of prohibition. Though the policy initially enjoyed the support of most Albertans, disregard for it was sufficiently widespread that effective enforcement proved impossible. The 1922 murder of Alberta Provincial Police constable Steve Lawson by bootleggers Emil Picariello and Florence Lassandro, for which they were hanged, helped turn public opinion against it. A referendum held on the issue found most voters willing to replace prohibition with government-owned liquor stores and rigidly-regulated beer parlours. And the Act was repealed. The Lord's Day Act, which prohibited most commerce on Sundays, was also Brownlee's responsibility, though he had little enthusiasm for it and prosecuted only the most flagrant violations.

Many UFA MLAs came to see the government's reliance on Brownlee as embarrassing, and Greenfield's abilities as too limited to continue to lead. In 1924, they pressured Greenfield to resign so Brownlee could replace him; Brownlee scuppered the plot by warning that Greenfield's resignation would be accompanied by his own. A second attempt in 1925 was successful when Wood intervened to convince Brownlee to accept the premiership and Greenfield assured him that he would be pleased to be rid of it. Brownlee became Premier of Alberta November 23, 1925.

== Premier ==
=== First term (1926–1930) ===
Brownlee's first challenges as premier were similar to those he had faced as attorney-general: winning control of Alberta's natural resources, selling the money-losing railways, and balancing the provincial budget. Before he could do any of these, however, he needed to win the impending provincial election. He accomplished this, winning 43 seats in the 1926 election, an increase from the 38 that the UFA had won in 1921 and enough for a majority in the 60-seat legislature.

Once returned to office, Brownlee turned his attention to his other priorities. Many of them required the cooperation of King's Liberal federal government: provincial control of resources would require the acquiescence of the federal government, and Brownlee felt that the deficit was in part the result of the federal government's failure to cover its rightful share of expenses. King was himself reliant on the UFA: his minority government survived thanks to the support of Progressives and allied factions, including the 11 UFA MPs. Though some UFA legislators preferred Arthur Meighen's Conservatives, Brownlee personally supported the King government, and even appeared to consider an offer from the Prime Minister to take Brownlee into his cabinet.

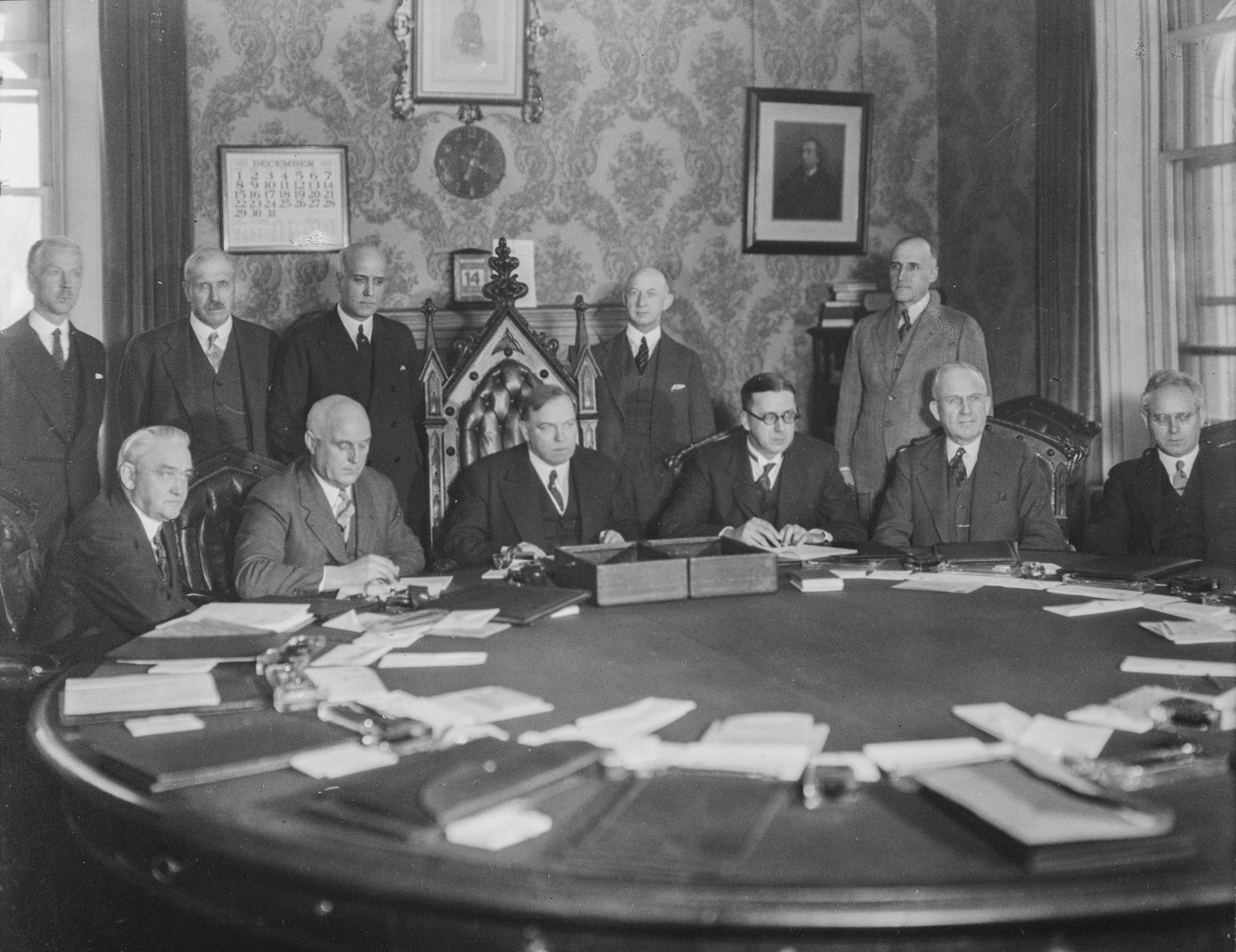
The natural resources agreement between Alberta and the federal government was signed December 14, 1929.

Brownlee attempted to leverage his relationship with King to win provincial control of natural resources. He won such an agreement in 1926, but it was soon scuttled by the federal addition of a clause requiring Alberta to continue supporting separate Roman Catholic schools. Wrangling over this clause persisted until 1929, when a compromise was reached. All that remained was the question of compensation to Alberta for land given away by the federal government, and by the end of 1929 agreement on this too was reached. Brownlee returned from Ottawa to Alberta, where he was greeted by 3,000 cheering supporters.

Brownlee was similarly successful in divesting the government of its railways. When his initial attempts to sell them to the CNR or CPR failed, the provincial government took over direct operation of the lines in 1927. In 1928, they began to show a profit, and one of the lines was soon sold to the CPR. A joint offer from the CPR and CNR of $15 million for the remaining lines was judged too low, but they were sold to the CPR near the end of 1928 for $25 million. Brownlee's negotiating skill was widely praised in the aftermath of the deal.

Control of natural resources and the divestment of the railways were two factors that permitted balanced provincial budgets, the first of which was registered in 1925. Despite this success, Brownlee continued to advocate austerity, and tried unsuccessfully to persuade the federal government to assume a greater share of the costs of new social programs, such as the old age pension. His resulting reputation as a penny-pincher came at a cost to his personal popularity.

Brownlee's government also attempted to advance a progressive agenda. One way this manifested itself was an attempt to consolidate Alberta's thousands of school districts into a far smaller number of school divisions. The plan was supported by educational reformers who believed that the decentralized status quo made province-wide reform impossible, but was scrapped when rural residents expressed fears that it would mean the closure of local schools. Another progressive initiative was the Sexual Sterilization Act, which allowed for the sterilization of "mental defectives". While the Act, repealed in 1972, is now viewed as barbaric, at the time it enjoyed the support of moral reformers like Nellie McClung, who believed it was for the subjects' own protection.

=== Second term (1930–1934) ===
Brownlee campaigned vigorously during the 1930 election, and was re-elected with a slightly diminished majority. However, the Great Depression was making itself felt in Alberta. The price of wheat, Alberta's major export, declined from a high of $1.78 per bushel in the summer of 1929, to $1.00 in the following March, to $0.45 by the end of 1930. The Alberta Wheat Pool (AWP) guaranteed its members a minimum price of $1.00 per bushel (itself not enough for many farmers to earn a living), and it found itself facing ruination. Banks denied credit to it and to individual farmers, which in turn made it difficult for the latter to afford seed for the 1931 crop. The provincial government faced calls to provide loan guarantees. Brownlee was concerned that such guarantees would encourage lenders to make loans at higher interest rates, with the knowledge that the provincial government would pay them if the farmers defaulted. He sought a federally guaranteed minimum price of $0.70 per bushel, but was rebuffed by Prime Minister R. B. Bennett, who saw the source of the problem as a global oversupply.

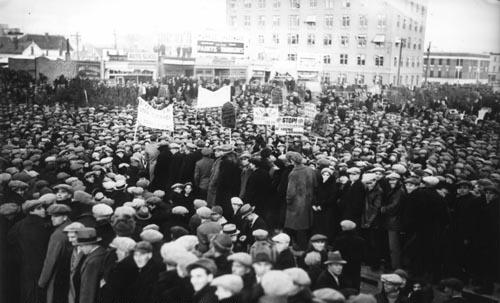
The Hunger March in Edmonton, December 1932

As farms failed, many young people migrated from rural areas to Alberta's cities, where the situation was scarcely better. As the unemployment rate rose, so did labour militancy. December 1932 saw a "hunger march", in which more than a thousand unemployed men and women attempted to hold a protest march to the Alberta legislature. Brownlee requested the Edmonton city government to prohibit such a display. While he pronounced himself sympathetic to the workers' ordeal, he said he felt such an event would create a volatile atmosphere that would breed radicalism and communism. It was through this lens that he had viewed the 1932 founding of the Co-operative Commonwealth Federation (CCF). Though many UFA members supported this new party, which saw itself as a partnership between farmers and labourers, Brownlee considered it dangerously socialist. When the hunger marchers attempted to go ahead without government sanction and were brutally dispersed by the Royal Canadian Mounted Police (RCMP) and Edmonton city police, Brownlee took much of the blame.

Further weakening Brownlee's control of the situation, the UFA, around this time, took a sharp left-ward turn, as Robert Gardiner replaced retiring Henry Wise Wood as president of the provincial body.

The weakened economy presented significant challenges to provincial government finances. 1931 saw the first deficit of Brownlee's premiership, of approximately $2.5 million, and 1932's was still larger. During the latter year, the province came within hours of defaulting on a $3 million bond, which was avoided only by a loan from the federal government. Brownlee cut spending aggressively: he closed most of the province's agricultural colleges, reduced the civil service by more than a third, cut provincial employees' salaries, and disbanded the Alberta Provincial Police, replacing it with the RCMP. His government also increased corporate taxes and implemented a new provincial income tax. These measures proved insufficient, and Brownlee joined his colleagues in the other western provinces in entreating Bennett to help. Bennett said he was privately sympathetic to Brownlee but refused to provide assistance.

In 1933, Brownlee was appointed to the Royal Commission on Banking and Currency as a representative of unorthodox economic views (despite his conservative approach to Alberta's finances – outside of the province he was viewed as a spokesperson of the progressive movement). Brownlee argued that banks were treating Eastern and Western debtors unequally, and that they were charging predatory interest rates to farmers. He joined the majority on the Commission in calling for the creation of a central bank in Canada but was alone in proposing that it be entirely publicly controlled.

During the Great Depression's early years, Calgary schoolteacher and evangelist William Aberhart began to preach a version of C. H. Douglas's social credit economic theory. Brownlee believed that Aberhart's proposals would be both unconstitutional (if implemented by a provincial government, which did not have control over monetary policy) and ineffective (since they would not create markets for Alberta's agricultural products). As Aberhart gained popularity, Brownlee attacked his solutions as illusory but had little of his own to offer but critiques and orthodoxy.

=== Sex scandal ===
In 1934, Brownlee was sued for the seduction of Vivian MacMillan, a Brownlee family friend and clerk in the provincial Attorney-General's office. MacMillan alleged that Brownlee had seduced her in 1930 and that the subsequent affair had lasted until 1933; Brownlee denied her story completely and said that the lawsuit was the result of a conspiracy between MacMillan, her fiancé, and Brownlee's opponents in the Liberal Party. After a sensational and well-publicized trial, the jury found in MacMillan's favour. However, Justice William Carlos Ives, who presided over the trial, disregarded its finding, ruling that MacMillan had failed to show that she had suffered any damage. Appeals eventually led to the Judicial Committee of the British Privy Council, at the time Canada's highest court of appeal, where MacMillan emerged victorious.

Once the jury issued its finding, Brownlee realized that his time as Premier was finished. He announced that he would resign as soon as a successor could be found, and on July 10, 1934, was replaced by Richard Gavin Reid.

== Later political career ==
In the months after his resignation, Brownlee kept a low profile, though he was still MLA for Ponoka. He returned to the public eye with a speech to the January 1935 UFA convention attacking Aberhart's plans to implement social credit in Alberta alone: "I would impress you that nothing but disillusionment, loss of hope and additional despair can follow any attempt to inaugurate a system of that kind, because the Province has no jurisdiction in these matters." Despite hearing directly from Aberhart, the convention defeated by a wide margin a motion to endorse his version of social credit.

Reid's government made Brownlee its chief strategist against Aberhart and social credit. One tactic he adopted was C. H. Douglas to serve as a consultant to the Alberta government on economic reconstruction. In doing this, Brownlee hoped both to co-opt the promise of social credit for the benefit of the UFA and to discredit Aberhart by demonstrating how widely his interpretation of social credit differed from Douglas's. This effort failed because Albertans, confronted by the contrast between the fiery, charismatic Aberhart and the aloof, technocratic Douglas, preferred the former. Brownlee also invited Aberhart to come to Edmonton and prepare proposals on which the government could act; this was an attempt to force him to take specific positions that could be attacked rather than relying on vague assurances of economic salvation, but was foiled by Aberhart's continued evasiveness.

Brownlee himself toured southern Alberta attacking Aberhart's policies as vague and unconstitutional. In April 1935, he gave a series of radio speeches designed to counter Aberhart's popular radio program, Back to the Bible Hour. When his customary appeals to logic did not work, Brownlee resorted to attacking Aberhart personally, comparing him to the Pied Piper of Hamelin. Aberhart did not resist the comparison, retorting that the pied piper had "rid the capitol of all the rats"; Brownlee responded that, after doing that, he had led its children to their destruction. In May 1935, after Aberhart announced that his social credit movement would contest the next provincial election, Brownlee ridiculed its candidate-selection process—in which Aberhart personally interviewed and selected more candidates for each riding than could ultimately run—as one in which the candidates would be "wrapped in cellophane and carefully hidden away so they will not dry out on [Aberhart], until the day he calls out the fittest and discards the rest".

The 1935 election took place August 22. Brownlee spent most of the campaign trying to retain his own riding of Ponoka. Despite the respect he commanded, his constituents were in desperate economic straits and tired of the UFA's orthodoxy, which had failed to raise their condition. As Brownlee later recalled:

One man got up and said, "Mr. Brownlee, we have listened to you with a great deal of attention and the answers you have given seem pretty hard to meet. But I have one more question…I'm selling my wheat at 25 cents a bushel. If I tried to sell a steer tomorrow I'd probably hardly get enough to pay the freight. I get 3 cents a dozen for eggs. I'm lucky to get a dollar for a can of cream. Will you tell me what I've got to lose?" and a cheer went over the audience. I knew then what the result of the election was going to be.

On election day, every UFA candidate in the province was defeated, as Aberhart's Social Crediters won 56 of 63 seats. In Ponoka, Social Credit's Edith Rogers defeated Brownlee 2,295 votes to 879. After this election, Brownlee never sought political office again.

== Life after politics ==
Shortly after his electoral defeat, Brownlee started a new law firm based in Edmonton. The United Grain Growers soon re-appointed him as their general counsel. By 1940, Brownlee had restored his career to it position before he entered politics: his firm counted a number of major agricultural companies among its clients, and the UGG too brought him considerable work. He was also hired to write a legal column for the Western Review newspaper.

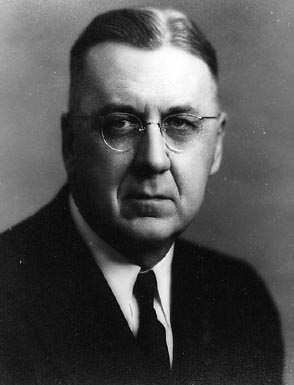
Brownlee, circa 1940

In his capacity as UGG general counsel, Brownlee was responsible for its restructuring. Its bylaws provided that only farmers could buy shares directly from the company, but placed no limitation on who could buy them from other shareholders. This had the effect of limiting capital inflow, since few farmers could afford to buy shares during the depression, and transferring control of the company to non-farmers, who were purchasing shares from impoverished farmers. Brownlee's solution was to create two classes of share: an investment share with a par value of $20, and a voting share with a par value of $5. The former could be held by any person, to a maximum of 250 shares per person, while the latter could be held only by farmers, to a maximum of 25 shares per person.

=== UGG director and vice president ===
When he restructured the UGG's capital, Brownlee included a rider that non-farmers who held shares at the time the new structure came into effect could hold voting shares. This clause allowed him to do so, and in consequence to be elected to the company's board of directors at the 1942 annual shareholders' meeting; he was also appointed the UGG's vice president.

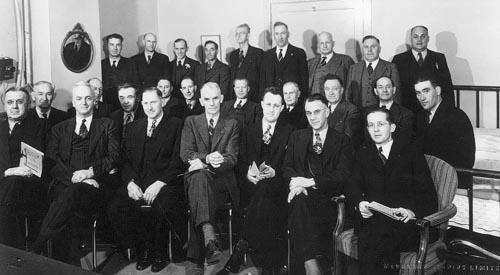
A 1946 UFA banquet in honour of Hugh Allen. Brownlee is seated in the front row at left.

At the time of Brownlee's appointment, the UGG was embroiled in an income tax dispute. Though the farmers' movement had generally supported the 1917 introduction of income tax, as rates climbed the UGG began to resent it, especially given that the pools were exempt. While the rationale for this exemption—that the pools were agents of their members, and that any income should therefore be taxed as personal income once disbursed, and not as corporate income pre-disbursal—was initially accepted, the UGG argued that the pools' 1931 reorganization eliminated the differences between them and the UGG, and that the exemption thus put the UGG at a competitive disadvantage. In 1941, Brownlee travelled to Ottawa to express the UGG's case; there he collaborated with O. M. Biggar, representing the private grain companies in the form of the North-West Line Elevators Association (NLEA), who also objected to the pools' exemption, on a joint brief to the Minister of National Revenue. The government ruled that the pools were taxable; the pools appealed to the Exchequer Court, which found in the government's favour in 1943. By this time, the government had agreed not to tax the pools for pre-1941 revenue and to grant generous exemptions on taxation thereafter.

After World War II, the federal government appointed the Royal Commission on Taxation of Cooperatives to examine the question in greater detail. Brownlee prepared the UGG's submission, and was pleased with the Commission's eventual findings: it recognized the UGG as a cooperative, and recommended that it be granted the same exemptions as the pools enjoyed. However, the government still intended to collect taxes from 1940 and 1941 from the UGG, but not from the pools. In February 1947, Brownlee returned to Ottawa to present the UGG's case to Finance Minister Douglas Abbott, who eventually sided with the UGG and extended the pools' exemption to it.

The acrimony this dispute engendered between the pools and the UGG led the former to suggest that the latter was not a true cooperative, but rather an old-style grain company. Brownlee played a major role in disputing these allegations, and was a major contributor to The Grain Growers' Record 1906–1943, the UGG's written response. When he, as the UGG's delegate to the Canadian Federation of Agriculture, opposed a resolution calling for the continued tax-exempt status of pools, the resolution's proponents suggested stating that it was "endorsed by the cooperatives"; Brownlee objected that the UGG was a cooperative, and the wording was withdrawn. The Alberta Wheat Pool later published a pamphlet entitled A History of Events Leading to Taxation of Cooperatives, which placed much of the blame on the UGG and Brownlee, accusing the latter of working with the hated private grain companies to "enforce taxation of the Wheat Pools". Seizing on an incorrect date in the pamphlet, Brownlee dismissed the charges—which were substantially true, in light of his 1941 joint brief with Biggar—as factually incorrect. Though UGG shareholders subjected him to vigorous questioning, he held firm and the controversy died down after he gave a series of radio addresses in Alberta, Saskatchewan, and Manitoba.

=== UGG President ===
In the mid-1940s, UGG President and General Manager R. S. Law fell ill, and in February 1947, Brownlee was named the UGG's Acting General Manager. On January 1, 1948, he became full General Manager. In spring 1948 Law stepped down completely, and on May 1 Brownlee succeeded him as President and General Manager.

In this capacity, he had offices in Calgary and Winnipeg. He worked constantly, often arriving at work on a Monday with a briefcase full of dictation machine recordings for secretaries to transcribe. Foster says that Brownlee was known by his staff as "a man whose life was his work, who lived in his briefcase, and whose only recreation seemed to be changing from one job to another".

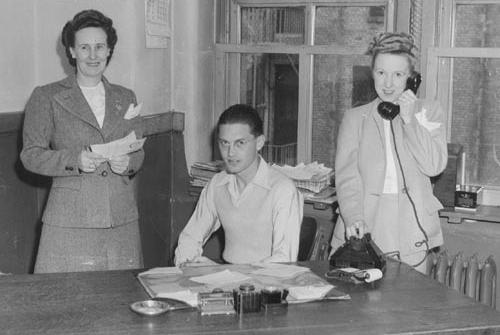
Calgary employees of the UGG's printing division, 1946

He turned this work ethic to expanding the company, building new grain elevators and purchasing existing ones. At the same time, he undertook a study of the operating costs and volume of each of the UGG's delivery points. He found that roughly a dozen elevators were losing money, with climbing costs threatening to increase this number. Brownlee tried to reach accommodations with the UGG's competitors to divide among them centres too small to support more than one elevator, and achieved some success, especially with the Alberta Wheat Pool. At the same time, Brownlee increased the UGG's presence in larger centres, especially Regina, Brandon, and Winnipeg.

Brownlee remained intimately involved in the grain industry even outside the UGG, in part through his position on the Canadian Federation of Agriculture executive. In this capacity, he found himself in the middle of a controversy over the British Wheat Agreement (BWA). The BWA was an agreement to sell wheat to British clients at a fixed price over a four-year period. The price was to be adjusted during the following two years, "having regard to" world wheat prices. During the first four years, world wheat prices were continually above the price stipulated in the agreement, breeding resentment towards the British, especially since they sold much of this fixed price wheat for a large profit in European markets. This was exacerbated when the British refused to adjust the price upwards for the last two years, on the grounds that there was nothing in the agreement to compel them to do so. The result was considerable ill will and a loss by grain farmers of an estimated $350 million. The federal government, which had negotiated the agreement, offered to supplement the British payments by $65 million, a sum large enough to raise the ire of eastern Canadians but too small to placate western farmers. Brownlee, who had opposed the agreement, authorized a purchase of advertising across the country pointing out that the government fixed the domestic price of wheat at $0.77 per bushel while the world price reached as high as $2.18. In Brownlee's view, the $65 million payment by the government paled in comparison to the benefit to consumers of the federal policy. Subsequent international agreements, for which Brownlee acted as an advisor to the Canadian delegation, resulted in more favourable terms for farmers. Brownlee's continued status as one of the grain industry's leading figures was also exhibited by his involvement in government relations. He appeared before the Canadian House of Commons Standing Committee on Agriculture to oppose a system of allocating box cars to each grain elevator by formula, favouring instead a system whereby the Canadian Wheat Board retained the flexibility to assign them as it saw fit. In his September 1960 submission to the Royal Commission on Transportation, In Defence of the Crow's Nest Pass Rates, he rejected the railways' calls to deregulate the rates they charged for the shipment of grain.

Brownlee's presidency coincided with the fiftieth anniversary of the Grain Growers Grain Company, one of the UGG's founding organizations. In celebration of the event, Brownlee travelled around the country speaking to UGG outlets. He also oversaw the publication, and wrote much, of The First Fifty Years, a history of the UGG to that point. In this capacity, he came into conflict with UGG Vice President R. C. Brown, in charge of the UGG department that published the book, and Assistant General Manager P. C. Watt. Brownlee had an interventionist style as President, which Foster acknowledged sometimes "verged on outright interference". As the years wore on, his decision-making became more autocratic, with the board of directors expected to serve as a rubber stamp.

On June 21, 1961, ill health forced Brownlee's resignation from the UGG.

=== Later political activities ===
Brownlee never sought political office after his 1935 defeat, and commented publicly on political issues only rarely. His distaste for Aberhart's social credit government—and in particular its contention, which Brownlee viewed as unfair, that the UFA had left the government bankrupt—did not prevent him from advising it behind the scenes on a number of issues, most notably Alberta's submission to the Rowell-Sirois Commission, The Case for Alberta.

In the early 1940s, he met M. J. Coldwell, the new federal leader of the CCF, on a train. According to Coldwell, in the ensuing conversation Brownlee indicated that he would be prepared to consider running federally as a CCF candidate. Coldwell excitedly reported this to some of the CCF's Alberta leaders; one of them telephoned Brownlee to question whether Coldwell's report was true. Brownlee adhered to a conservative view of how politics should be conducted, and was perhaps put off by the audacious telephone call; despite an apology from Coldwell, Brownlee did not indicate any further interest in running for the CCF.

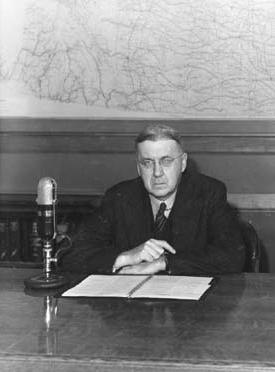
Brownlee in 1944

Brownlee's occasional public comments on political issues still attracted considerable attention. He spoke to the 1944 UFA convention on post-war reconstruction, and expressed pessimism about Canada's economic prospects. He advocated a policy of full employment, and emphasized that jobs had to be meaningful rather than "put[ting] men to work building roads like coolies in China when machines can do it better". He criticized the government-imposed wartime ceiling on wheat prices, of $1.25 per bushel, as forcing farmers to shoulder an unfair burden of a national crisis, as they had during the depression.

=== Personal life ===
Brownlee's father had died in January 1934, while the MacMillan suit was still pending. In April 1941, his mother died intestate and left an estate of $1,507. Brownlee relinquished any claim on the estate in favour of his sister, who had cared for their mother in her last years.

Brownlee's sons became successful at their careers: Alan graduated from law at the University of Alberta and joined his father's firm, which was renamed Brownlee, Baldwin and Brownlee, while John studied photography in Los Angeles and returned to Canada to work as a photographer. Both married and had children. In time, Brownlee relinquished the law firm—now Brownlee and Brownlee—to Alan, and returned to Calgary, where he and his wife led a quiet, reserved life. When Calgary planners announced their intention to widen Memorial Drive, where the Brownlees lived, several residents expressed concern that the plan would destroy the street's trees; they consulted Brownlee, who telephoned the mayor and saved the trees.

In his last years, Brownlee received a number of honours. Premier of Manitoba Duff Roblin inducted him into the province's Order of the Buffalo Hunt in November 1960, in recognition of his contributions to the prairie provinces. The UFA awarded him an honorary life membership, and Prime Minister John Diefenbaker appointed him to the National Productivity Council, though ill health prevented him from participating after its inaugural March 1961 meeting.

Beginning in June 1957, Brownlee underwent a series of major surgeries. By this time his memory was failing, and he often had to ask his wife for details that escaped him. He died July 15, 1961, two weeks after resigning from the UGG board and barely three after resigning as President.

== Legacy ==
As Premier, Brownlee is most remembered for the sex scandal that ended his career; his accomplishments are largely forgotten. Still, he is highly regarded by historians: Foster calls him "Alberta's greatest premier" and cites, in particular, his successful negotiations for the transfer of resource rights to the provincial government as the cause of Alberta's subsequent prosperity. Journalist Ted Byfield concurs, noting that his willingness to confront the federal government sets him apart from Ernest Manning, another contender for the title. In 1980, the Edmonton Journal wrote, "The lasting political estate left by former Premier John Brownlee has made Alberta what it is today, one of Canada's wealthiest provinces fuelled by billions of dollars in oil and gas royalties."

A University of Calgary undergraduate seminar in 2005 ranked Brownlee as the province's third greatest premier, behind Manning and Peter Lougheed.

Brownlee's impact is also felt through the organizations he participated in founding: the Alberta Wheat Pool remained an important player in Canadian agriculture until 1998, when it merged with Manitoba Pool Elevators to form Agricore Cooperative Ltd. In 2001, this new company merged with the UGG to form Agricore United. In 2007, the Saskatchewan Wheat Pool took it over, forming Viterra. Brownlee's vision, unique among the members of the Macmillan Commission, of a publicly controlled central bank became a reality in 1938, when the Bank of Canada shifted from private to government control.

Brownlee was buried at Evergreen Memorial Gardens near Edmonton. The provincial government's John E. Brownlee Building in Edmonton is named in his honour, as is the University of Alberta Faculty of Law's John E. Brownlee Memorial Prize in Local Government Law.

== Electoral record ==
=== As party leader ===
1926 Alberta provincial election
Party	Party Leader	# of candidates	Seats			Popular Vote		
Party	Party Leader	# of candidates	1921	Elected	% Change	#	%	% Change
United Farmers	John E. Brownlee	46	38	43	+13.2%	71,967	39.68%	+10.76%
Liberal	Joseph Tweed Shaw	54	15	7	-36.4%	47,450	26.17%	-7.90%
Labour		12	4	5	+25.0%	14,123	7.79%	-3.25%
Conservative	Alexander McGillivray	56	-	4		40,091	22.10%	+11.12%
Independent Labour		1	-	1		2,467	1.37%	-1.69%
Independent Liberal		5	-	-		2,728	1.51%	1.02%
Independent		3	4	-	-100%	1,254	0.70%	-8.96%
Independent UFA		5		-		999	0.55%	
Liberal–Progressive	A. D. Campbell	1		-		252	0.13%	
Total		183	61	60	-	181,331	100%	

1930 Alberta provincial election
Party	Party Leader	# of candidates	Seats			Popular Vote		
Party	Party Leader	# of candidates	1926	Elected	% Change	#	%	% Change
United Farmers	John E. Brownlee	47	43	39	-9.3%	74,187	39.41%	-0.27%
Liberal	George Harry Webster	36	7	11	+57.1%	46,275	24.59%	-1.58%
Conservative	David Milwyn Duggan	18	5	6	+20.0%	27,954	14.85%	-7.25%
Labour	Fred J. White	11	5	4	-20.0%	14,354	7.63%	-0.16%
Communist		1						
Independent		28	-	3		25,449	13.52%	+12.82%
Total		141	61	63	+3.3%	188,219	100%	

=== As MLA ===
Alberta provincial by-election, December 9, 1921: Ponoka Following the death of Percival Baker on July 19, 1921.
Party	Candidate	Votes	%	±%
United Farmers	John Edward Brownlee	Acclaimed	–	–
Total		–	–	–
United Farmers hold		Swing		–
Source(s) Mardon 107

1926 Alberta general election: Ponoka
Party	Candidate	Votes	%	±%
United Farmers	John Edward Brownlee	1,357	62.91%	-0.14%
Liberal	Marcus Crandall	453	21.00%	-15.94%
Conservative	Arthur Beaumont	347	16.09%	–
Total		2,157	–	–
Rejected, spoiled and declined		N/A	–	–
Eligible electors / turnout		3,207	67.26%	–
United Farmers hold		Swing		7.90%
Source(s) Source: "Ponoka Official Results 1926 Alberta general election". Alberta Heritage Community Foundation. See Mardon 107

1930 Alberta general election: Ponoka
Party	Candidate	Votes	%	±%
United Farmers	John Edward Brownlee	Acclaimed	–	–
Total		N/A	–	–
Rejected, spoiled and declined		N/A	–	–
Eligible electors / turnout		N/A	N/A	–
United Farmers hold		Swing		N/A
Source(s) Source: "Ponoka Official Results 1930 Alberta general election". Alberta Heritage Community Foundation. See Mardon 107

1935 Alberta general election: Ponoka
Party	Candidate	Votes	%	±%
Social Credit	Edith Rogers	2,295	59.30%	–
United Farmers	John Edward Brownlee	879	22.71%	–
Liberal	Robert McLaren	696	17.98%	–
Total		3,870	–	–
Rejected, spoiled and declined		N/A	–	–
Eligible electors / turnout		4,559	84.89%	–
Social Credit gain from United Farmers		Swing		N/A
Source(s) Source: "Ponoka Official Results 1935 Alberta general election". Alberta Heritage Community Foundation.

== Bibliography ==
- Brennan, Brian (2008). The Good Steward: The Ernest C. Manning Story. Calgary, Alberta: Fifth House Ltd. ISBN 978-1-897252-16-1.
- Byrne, T. C. (1991). Alberta's Revolutionary Leaders. Calgary, Alberta: Detselig Enterprises. ISBN 1-55059-024-3.
- Craig, Jessica J.; Perry, Sandra E. (2006). The Mantle of Leadership : Premiers of the Northwest Territories and Alberta. Edmonton, Alberta: Legislative Assembly of Alberta. ISBN 0-9689217-2-8.
- Felske, Lorry; Rasporich, Beverly Jean (2004). Challenging frontiers: the Canadian west. Calgary, Alberta: University of Calgary Press. ISBN 1-55238-140-4.
- Foster, Franklin L. (1981). John E. Brownlee: A Biography. Lloydminster, Alberta: Foster Learning Inc. ISBN 978-1-55220-004-9.
- Foster, Franklin L. (2004). "John E. Brownlee". In Bradford J. Rennie (ed.). Alberta Premiers of the Twentieth Century. Regina, Saskatchewan: Canadian Plains Research Center, University of Regina. ISBN 0-88977-151-0.
- Jones, David C. (2004). "Herbert W. Greenfield". In Bradford J. Rennie (ed.). Alberta Premiers of the Twentieth Century. Regina, Saskatchewan: Canadian Plains Research Center, University of Regina. ISBN 0-88977-151-0.
- Mardon, Ernest; Mardon, Austin (1993). Alberta Election Results 1882–1992. Edmonton: Documentary Heritage Society of Alberta.
- Wardhaugh, Robert Alexander (2000). MacKenzie King and the Prairie West. Toronto: University of Toronto Press, Incorporated. ISBN 0-8020-4733-5.
