= Neville Roper =

Canadian politician (1922–2023)

Member of the Legislative Assembly of Alberta
- In office May 23, 1967 – August 30, 1971
- Preceded by: Glen Johnston
- Succeeded by: Don McCrimmon
- Constituency: Ponoka

Personal details
- Born: Neville Sydney Roper; March 5, 1922 Camrose, Alberta, Canada
- Died: August 28, 2023 (aged 101) Rimbey, Alberta, Canada
- Party: Social Credit
- Spouse: Edith Margaret Hawkings (m. 1948; died 1999)
- Children: 3
- Profession: Businessman

Neville Sydney Roper (March 5, 1922 – August 28, 2023) was a Canadian provincial politician from Alberta. He served as a member of the Legislative Assembly of Alberta from 1967 to 1971 sitting with the Social Credit caucus in government.

== Political career ==
Roper served on the Rimbey, Alberta town council from 1951 to 1961, and as Mayor of Rimbey from 1961 to 1966. He ran for a seat to the Alberta Legislature as an Independent Social Credit candidate in the Ponoka electoral district in the 1963 Alberta general election. He finished a very close second place losing to incumbent Glen Johnston.

Roper ran for provincial office for the second time in the 1967 Alberta general election. He ran as the official Social Credit candidate this time and won a landslide to hold the seat for his party.

Roper ran for a second term in office in the 1971 Alberta general election but was defeated by Progressive Conservative candidate Don McCrimmon. He lost the race by 17 votes finishing second.

== Personal life and death ==
Of English descent, Roper was born in Camrose, Alberta, the son of Henry Basil Sydney Roper and Amy Burchnall. He served in the Royal Canadian Air Force from 1941 to 1946 during World War II.

Roper married Edith Margaret Hawkings in 1948 and had three children. His wife died in 1999. He turned 100 in 2022.

Neville Roper died on August 28, 2023, at the age of 101.
