= John R. McLeod =

Canadian politician

John Robert McLeod

Member of the Legislative Assembly of Alberta
- In office 1905–1909
- Succeeded by: William A. Campbell
- Constituency: Ponoka

Personal details
- Born: January 20, 1872 Zorra, Ontario
- Died: May 4, 1931 (aged 59)
- Party: Liberal
- Spouse: Grace Victoria Bentley
- Education: Detroit College of Medicine
- Occupation: physician, politician

John Robert McLeod (January 20, 1872 – May 4, 1931) was a Canadian medical doctor and politician from Alberta.

McLeod was born in Zorra, Ontario on January 20, 1872 to William C. McLeod and Mary C. Mackay, both of Scottish heritage. McLeod would complete is M.D. at Detroit College of Medicine in 1896, and be licensed by the College of Physicians and Surgeons in the North-West Territories. McLeod married American Grace Victoria Bentley in 1898 and served as a medical health officer in Michigan from 1897 to 1900, and would later purchase a farm in Canada.

He was elected to a term in the Alberta Legislature in the 1905 Alberta general election with a 110-vote plurality over Conservative candidate John Jackson. He would serve as a backbencher with the government and serve on the Committee on Privileges and Elections.

Legislative Assembly of Alberta
Preceded by New District	MLA Ponoka; 1905–1909	Succeeded by William A. Campbell
