= Bennett Jones =

International law firm

Bennett Jones LLP
- Headquarters: Calgary and Toronto
- No. of offices: 7
- No. of lawyers: 450
- No. of employees: 550
- Major practice areas: Energy, Mining, Funds & Finance, Capital Projects
- Date founded: 1922 (Calgary)
- Company type: Limited liability partnership
- Website: www.bennettjones.com

Bennett Jones LLP is a large national law firm based in Canada.

== Firm ==
Bennett Jones is an internationally recognized Canadian law firm. It is home to more than 450 lawyers and business advisors in seven offices—Calgary, Toronto, Edmonton, Ottawa, Vancouver, Montréal, and New York.

The firm advises clients in a variety of business, industry, and government sectors. Bennett Jones has been recognized as one of Canada's top law firms, with particular recognition for its leadership in energy project development, litigation, financing, real estate, labour, regulatory, and Indigenous law issues.

== Notable alumni and advisors ==
- Hon. John Russell Baird PC - Former Canadian politician who served as Minister of Foreign Affairs under Prime Minister Stephen Harper (2011–15)
- Rt. Hon. R. B. Bennett PC KC, 1st Viscount Bennett – Founding partner and former Prime Minister of Canada (1930–35)
- David A. Dodge OC FRSC – Senior Advisor and former Governor of the Bank of Canada (2001–08)
- Allan Gotlieb CC OM – Senior advisor and former Canadian ambassador to the United States of America (1981–89)
- Michael Kergin – Senior advisor and former Canadian ambassador to the United States of America (2000–05)
- John C. "Jack" Major CC KC– Counsel and former Puisne Justice of the Supreme Court of Canada (1992–2005)
- Hon. Anne McLellan PC OC AOE – Counsel, former Member of Parliament (1993–2006) and Deputy Prime Minister of Canada (2003–06)
- Brig. Henry Grattan Nolan CBE MC - Former Puisne Justice of the Supreme Court of Canada (1956–57)
- Christy Clark - senior advisor and former Premier of British Columbia (2011–2017)
- Hon. Jason Kenney PC ECA - Senior advisor, former Premier of Alberta (2019–2022), former Member of Parliament (1997-2016) and Minister of National Defense (2015)

== History ==
Bennett Jones was founded in Calgary in 1922 with the dissolution of a 25-year partnership between R.B. Bennett and Sir James Alexander Lougheed (Lougheed, Bennett & Company) and the creation of the new partnership Bennett, Hannah & Sanford.

The firm expanded to Edmonton (1982) and then eastward to Toronto (1989) and Ottawa (1989–95, 2009). In 2018, the firm merged with Vancouver firm McCullough O'Connor Irwin and opened an office in New York.
