= Alberta Originals =

Book of biographical profiles by Brian Brennan

Alberta Originals: Stories of Albertans Who Made a Difference
- First edition
- Author: Brian Brennan
- Language: English
- Subject: Biography, Canadian history
- Publisher: Fifth House
- Publication date: 2001
- Publication place: Canada
- Media type: paperback
- Pages: 216
- ISBN: 978-1894004763
- OCLC: 47823514

Alberta Originals: Stories of Albertans Who Made a Difference, originally published by Fifth House under ISBN 1-894004-76-0, is a book of short biographical profiles written by Irish-Canadian author Brian Brennan. It's a sequel to Building a Province: 60 Alberta Lives, which Brennan published a year earlier.

== Contents ==
The profiled Albertans include the following:

- The Famous Five:
  - Henrietta Muir Edwards
  - Louise McKinney
  - Emily Murphy
  - Irene Parlby
  - Nellie McClung
- Frank Oliver
- The Big Four
  - Patrick Burns
  - George Lane
  - Archibald J. McLean
  - Alfred Ernest Cross
- Sir Frederick Haultain
- Henry Frank Lawrence
- Bill Herron
- Ho Lem
- William Aberhart
- Maude Riley
- Martin Holdom
- Monica Hopkins
- William Irvine
- Morris Cohen
- Karl Clark
- Elizabeth Sterling Haynes
- Gladys Egbert
- Lizzie Rummel
- Norma Piper Pocaterra
- Annora Brown
- Llewellyn May Jones
- Punch Dickins
- Frank McMahon
- Francis Winspear
- Catherine Robb Whyte
- Eva Reid
- Herman Linder
- Betty Pedersen
- Ernest Manning
- Christine Meikle
- Pearl Borgal
- Bob Simpson
- Lillian Knupp
- Max Bell
- David Lander
- William Hawrelak
- Bruno Engler
- Ruth Carse
- Scotty Munro
- Mac Coleman
- Joe Shoctor
- J. Patrick O'Callaghan
- Ralph T. Scurfield
- Eugene Steinhauer
- Jimmy Fitzsimmons
- Violet King Henry
- Les Kimber
- Joe Kryczka
- Harold Hanen
- Ray Lowry
- Winnie Tomm
- Sandra Botting
- Irma Parhad
- Nelson Small Legs Jr.
