= Glen Johnston =

Canadian politician (1901–1991)

Glen Forrest Johnston

Member of the Legislative Assembly of Alberta
- In office August 5, 1952 – May 23, 1967
- Preceded by: Ora B. Moore
- Succeeded by: Neville Roper
- Constituency: Ponoka

Personal details
- Born: August 22, 1901
- Died: July 8, 1991 (aged 89)
- Party: Social Credit
- Occupation: politician

Glen Forrest Johnston (August 22, 1901 – July 8, 1991) was a provincial politician from Alberta, Canada. He served as a member of the Legislative Assembly of Alberta from 1952 to 1967 sitting with the Social Credit caucus in government.

== Political career ==
Johnston ran for a seat to the Alberta Legislature in the 1952 Alberta general election. He stood as the Social Credit candidate in the electoral district of Ponoka and won a solid majority defeating two other candidates to hold the district of his party.

Johnston ran for a second term in office in the 1955 Alberta general election. He held his seat in a hotly contested five way race that went to a third vote count.

The 1959 Alberta general election saw Johnston run for his third term in office. He would defeat two other candidates with just over half the popular vote to hold his seat.

Johnston ran for a fourth term in office in the 1963 Alberta general election. He would nearly be defeated by Independent Social Credit candidate Neville Roper who finished a very close second in the three way race.

Johnston retired from provincial office at dissolution of the assembly in 1967. His son, Dale Johnston, later served as Member of Parliament for Wetaskiwin, Alberta, Canada from 1993 to 2006.
