= Brian Brennan (author) =

Irish-Canadian author and historian

Brian Anthony Brennan (October 4, 1943 – February 21, 2021) was an Irish-Canadian author and historian who specialized in books about the colourful personalities of Western Canada's past.

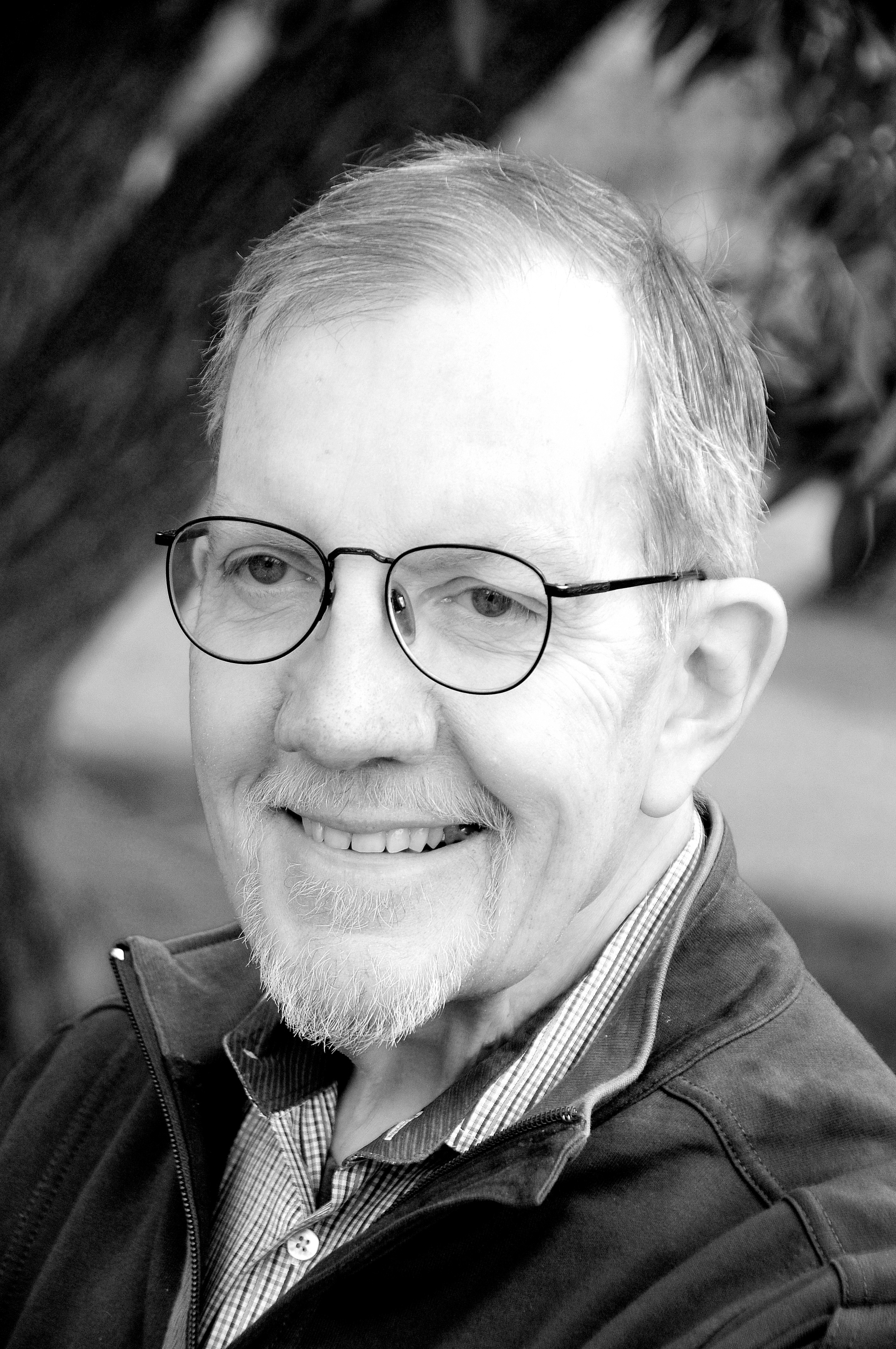
Brennan in 2015

Born in Dublin, Ireland, he migrated to Canada in 1966 and had lived in Calgary, Alberta, since 1974. He spent 25 years as a staff writer with the Calgary Herald writing columns and feature stories.

Brennan was part of an attempt by the Communications, Energy and Paperworkers Union of Canada to organize a union local for the newsroom and negotiate a first contract with the Calgary Herald. Before and during the eight-month strike by journalists in 1999 and 2000, Brennan was a member of the union's bargaining committee. When the strike ended in June 2000 with the dissolution of the union, he left the Herald to devote himself full-time to writing books. He was the first winner of the Dave Greber Freelance Writers Award, presented in 2004 for his book Romancing the Rockies.

A longtime National Council member of The Writers' Union of Canada, he quit the union in 2018 when the union executive supported a decision by the editor of the union magazine to kill a story about a writers' conference in San Miguel de Allende Mexico that she had commissioned Brennan to write.

== Bibliography ==
- Building a Province: 60 Alberta Lives. Calgary: Fifth House, 2000.
- Alberta Originals: Stories of Albertans Who Made a Difference. Calgary: Fifth House, 2001.
- Scoundrels and Scallywags: Characters from Alberta's Past. Calgary: Fifth House, 2002.
- Boondoggles, Bonanzas, and Other Alberta Stories. Calgary: Fifth House, 2003.
- Romancing the Rockies. Calgary: Fifth House, 2005.
- How the West was Written: The Life and Times of James H. Gray. Calgary: Fifth House, 2006.
- The Good Steward: The Ernest C. Manning Story. Calgary: Fifth House/Fitzhenry & Whiteside, 2008.
- Leaving Dublin: Writing My Way from Ireland to Canada. Calgary: RMB | Rocky Mountain Books, 2011.
- The Calgary Public Library: Inspiring Life Stories Since 1912. Calgary: Kingsley Publishing, 2012.
- Rogues and Rebels: Unforgettable Characters from Canada's West. Regina: University of Regina Press, 2015.
- Family Energy: The Story of Bob and Carole Brawn. Calgary: Kingsley Publishing, 2016.
- Brief Encounters: Conversations with Celebrities. North Charleston, SC: CreateSpace, 2017.
