= Caroline Fulham =

- Born: 1852; Ireland

Caroline "Mother" Fulham (1852–unknown) was an Irish-born Canadian known for raising pigs in Calgary, Alberta, and impacting city bylaws regarding the care of animals within city limits.

Fulham was born in Ireland and moved to Calgary in 1889. Her husband John Fulham was a rancher. He spent much of his time living and working outside of town and only occasionally visited the city. As a resident in the city she was known for disorderly behaviour and run-ins with the police. She was known the only woman to drink at the Alberta Hotel, which otherwise had an all-male clientele, and for frequent arrests while under the influence of alcohol.

Fulham lived at 612-6th Avenue SW. She raised pigs and other animals in her backyard. Her pigs were fed using waste from local hotels and restaurants. She collected waste in a swill barrel, traveling around town on a horse-drawn cart. At the time, there were no laws against raising livestock within city limits. James Alexander Lougheed complained to the city that the value of land he owned was negatively impacted by Fulham's pig raising activities. In response, city council introduced the first set of building restrictions in Calgary's history.

Fulham was frequently represented in court by fellow Irish-Canadian, Paddy Nolan, and was known for theatrics in the courtroom. Following the death of a cow following a collision with a Canadian Pacific Railway vehicle, she had Nolan sue the company for damages. The company argued it was not responsible due to the posting of "No Trespassing" signs along the rail line. In response Fulham yelled "You fools! What made you think my cow could read?".

Fulham left Calgary in 1904. She sold her property following the death of her husband in 1903. Fulham lived briefly for a time in Vancouver before returning to Calgary in 1905. Her whereabouts after that time are unknown. The building where she lived was eventually torn down to accommodate development in the city.

Sarah Carter has argued that Fulham's behaviour was noteworthy because it went against and tested social norms related to the behaviour of women. Linda Kupececk echoed the assessment stating that Fulham "pushed the boundaries of what women could be in frontier Calgary."
