= Paddy Nolan =

Canadian lawyer (1862–1913)

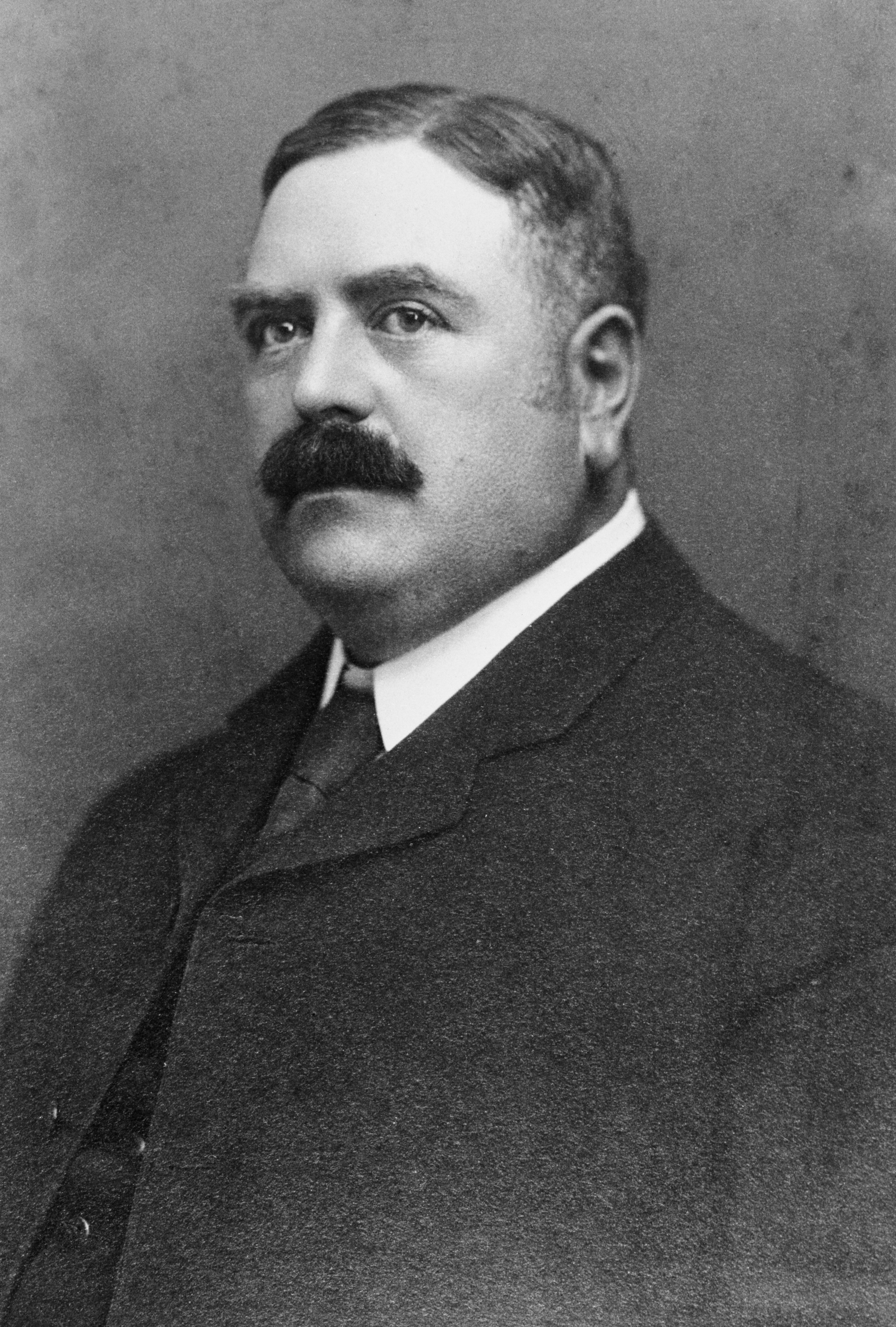
- Paddy Nolan in 1910
- Born: Patrick James Nolan; March 3, 1862; Limerick, Ireland
- Died: February 10, 1913 (aged 50); Calgary, Alberta
- Occupation: Lawyer

Patrick James Nolan (March 3, 1862 in Limerick, Ireland – February 10, 1913 in Calgary, Alberta) was an early Canadian 'frontier' lawyer, whose fame as "the greatest wit in the west" has led to stories and legends in Canadian folklore about his criminal law practice in Calgary.

Nolan moved to Calgary in 1889, and located his office above the Calgary Herald printing house, which led to his friendship with journalist Norman Luxton.

He was widely known as a hard-drinking lawyer with a sharp wit and a skill for defending the underprivileged class of society. Some of his clients included Caroline Fulham. He had an enduring friendship with the legendary journalist Bob Edwards, founder of the Eye-Opener.

A well-known tale recounts how Nolan's physical resemblance to Minister of the Interior Thomas Mayne Daly often led to the two being confused for each other. Once, after Daly had jokingly angered a legal client of Nolan's by impersonating the lawyer, Nolan got his revenge by refusing to grant a patent to a prospective homesteader, insisting that the Ministry of the Interior would require a bribe in order to look at his file - leading to Daly sending Nolan a note several days later about the "bad name" that the Ministry was getting due to his hijinx.

In 1894, Nolan and his wife Mary Elizabeth Lee had a son, Henry Grattan Nolan, who would later go on to serve as Canada's judge on the 1945-1948 International Military Tribunal for the Far East in Tokyo and who was appointed to the Supreme Court of Canada in 1956.
