= Percival Baker =

Canadian politician

Personal details
- Born: January 11, 1867 York County, Ontario
- Died: June 19, 1921 (aged 54) Edmonton, Alberta
- Party: United Farmers
- Occupation: farmer

Percival Baker (January 11, 1867 – July 19, 1921) was a farmer, church minister, and provincial politician in Alberta, Canada. He was elected as a member of the Legislative Assembly of Alberta in the 1921 provincial election, however died the next day from injuries sustained weeks before.

== Early life ==
Baker was born in York County, Ontario in 1867. He attended Kentucky University. After graduating from University he joined the ministry of the Baptist Church and served for many years. He moved to Alberta in 1908 and took up farming.

== Political career and death ==
He ran as an Independent in the 1913 provincial election, and was defeated by Liberal incumbent William A. Campbell.

Baker became heavily involved in the United Farmers of Alberta eventually becoming Vice President for the organization.

He successfully ran in the 1921 provincial election, for the United Farmers of Alberta. Baker faced Campbell again, however this time Campbell was attempting to regain his seat, after losing it in the 1917 election to a Conservative candidate. Baker won despite being unable to campaign for the last weeks of the election, he won his district of Ponoka by a large majority. The accident that claimed his life happened about three weeks prior, on his farm, while chopping down trees.

After the accident he was transferred to the Royal Alexandra Hospital in Edmonton, and died from injuries about 24 hours after his victory was announced. Prior to his death it was speculated he would have been a member of the United Farmers governing cabinet.

Future Premier John Edward Brownlee would replace him as the representative for his electoral district. Brownlee was acclaimed in a by-election held on December 9, 1921.

Baker was a family man, at the time of his death he left behind a wife and 7 children (2 daughters and 5 sons).
