= Building a Province: 60 Alberta Lives =

- First edition
- Author: Brian Brennan
- Language: English
- Publisher: Fifth House
- Publication date: 2000
- Publication place: Canada
- Pages: 215
- ISBN: 1-894004-53-1

Building a Province: 60 Alberta Lives is a book of short biographical profiles written by Irish-Canadian author Brian Brennan. It takes as its point of departure the feature obituaries Brennan wrote while working as a staff columnist with the Calgary Herald between 1992 and 1999.

== Reception ==
The book made the first of six weekly appearances on the Calgary Herald bestsellers list on Nov. 11, 2000, rising to the number one position on Jan. 6, 2001.

== Cast ==
The profiled Albertans include the following:

- Bill Gold
- Leonard Gaetz
- Sir James Lougheed
- Bob Edwards
- Henry Wise Wood
- Victoria Calihoo
- Henry Marshall Tory
- Richard Gavin Reid
- J. Percy Page
- Chief Buffalo Child Long Lance
- Kathleen Parlow
- Morris Shumiatcher
- Eric Harvie
- Jock Palmer
- Betty Mitchell
- Peggy Holmes
- Stastia Cross Carry
- Carl Anderson
- Vera Jacques Ireland
- Charlie Edgar
- Bert Sheppard
- Catherine Barclay
- Grant MacEwan
- George DuPre
- Hazel Braithwaite
- Mary Dover
- James H. Gray
- Kerry Wood
- Alice Murdoch Adams
- Arnold Platt
- Nicholas Morant
- Melvin "Fritz" Hanson
- Fred C. Mannix
- Violet Archer
- Harry Strom
- Jimmy "the Con" Carleton
- W.O. Mitchell
- Jean Hoare
- Father Pat O'Byrne
- Jack Gallagher
- William Morrow
- Betty O'Hanlon
- Webster Macdonald Sr.
- Stan Waters
- Clarence Horatius Miller
- Roloff Beny
- Bill Pratt
- Alexander Gray
- Bob Hatfield
- Glen Gorbous
- Johnny Bright
- Bob Johnson
- Walter Twinn
- Helen Collinson
- Grant Notley
- Sheldon Chumir
- David Walsh
- Allan Stein
