= James H. Gray =

Canadian journalist, historian and author

James Henry Gray
- Born: August 31, 1906; Whitemouth, Manitoba
- Died: November 12, 1998 (aged 92)
- Writing career
- Notable awards: Order of Canada; Alberta Order of Excellence

James Henry Gray, CM AOE (August 31, 1906 – November 12, 1998) was a Canadian journalist, historian and author.

Born in Whitemouth, Manitoba, he moved to Winnipeg with his parents in 1911. In 1922, he dropped out of public school and went to work at the Winnipeg Grain Exchange as a messenger. Over the next eight years, he worked at the Exchange as an office clerk, bookkeeper, statistician and grain trader.

He was laid off in 1930 because of the Great Depression, and spent the next four years on unemployment relief. During that time, he upgraded his education by reading library books on politics, religion and economics, with a view to becoming a freelance writer.

In 1933, after two years of trying, he finally sold a freelance article to the Winnipeg Free Press. Two years later, he was hired on as a full-time reporter. He worked there until 1947 as a city hall reporter, editorial writer and Ottawa correspondent. He left the paper because he didn't want to write articles supporting his editor's opposition to federal agricultural subsidies, and moved to Calgary, Alberta.

He was editor of the Farm and Ranch Review until 1955, when he became editor of the Western Oil Examiner. From 1958 to 1964, he was manager of public relations for Home Oil. He took early retirement in 1964, to complete work on his first book, The Winter Years. Between 1966 and 1991, he published a succession of bestselling popular histories of Western Canada.

In 1967, he won the Historical Society of Alberta's award for "outstanding contribution to Alberta history." In 1970, he received the University of British Columbia medal for popular biography. In 1980, he was chosen by Alberta Report magazine as one of the top twelve Albertans of the 1970s for "creating a series of popular histories on the agonies and triumphs that brought about Western Canada."

In 1987, he was inducted into the Alberta Order of Excellence. In 1988, he was made a Member of the Order of Canada. In 1995, he received the Pierre Berton Award for popularizing Canadian history. In 1996, the City of Calgary dedicated a small park in his name. He received honorary doctorates from the University of Calgary, Brandon University and the University of Manitoba.

He died in Calgary, Alberta.

== Selected bibliography ==
- The Winter Years (1966)
- Men Against the Desert (1967)
- The Boy from Winnipeg (1970)
- Red Lights on the Prairies (1971)
- Booze – When Whisky Ruled the West (1972)
- The Roar of the Twenties (1975)
- Troublemaker! (an autobiography) (1978)
- Boomtime (1979)
- Bacchanalia Revisited (1982)
- A Brand of its Own: A History of the Calgary Exhibition and Stampede (1985)
- Talk to My Lawyer (1987)
- R.B. Bennett: The Calgary Years (1991)
