= List of elections in 1980 =

The following elections occurred in the year 1980.

== Africa ==
- 1980 Angolan legislative election
- 1980 Cameroonian presidential election
- 1980 Cape Verdean parliamentary election
- 1980 Egyptian constitutional referendum
- 1980 Gabonese legislative election
- 1980 Guinean legislative election
- 1980 Ivorian parliamentary election
- 1980 Ivorian presidential election
- 23 May 1980 Moroccan constitutional referendum
- 30 May 1980 Moroccan constitutional referendum
- 1980 São Toméan legislative election
- 1980 Southern Rhodesian general election
- 1980 Sudanese parliamentary election
- 1980 Tanzanian general election
- 1980 Ugandan general election

== Asia ==
- 1980 Iranian legislative election
- 1980 Iranian presidential election
- 1980 Iraqi parliamentary election
- 1980 Japanese House of Councillors election
- 1980 Japanese general election
- 1980 Philippine Kabataang Barangay election
- 1980 Philippine local elections
- 1980 Republic of China legislative election
- 1980 Singaporean general election
- 1980 South Korean presidential election
- 1980 South Korean constitutional referendum
- 1980 Turkish presidential election

=== India ===
- 1980 Indian general election
- 1980 Indian general election in Andhra Pradesh
- 1980 Indian general election in Tamil Nadu
- 1980 Tamil Nadu Legislative Assembly election

=== Australia ===
- 1980 Australian federal election
- 1980 Bankstown state by-election
- 1980 Castlereagh state by-election
- 1980 Denison state by-election
- 1980 Ku-ring-gai state by-election
- 1980 Murray state by-election
- 1980 Northern Territory general election
- 1980 Norwood state by-election
- 1980 Queensland state election
- 1980 Western Australian state election

== Europe ==
- Austrian presidential election
- Czechoslovak presidential election
- Faroese parliamentary election
- Gibraltar general election
- Greek presidential election
- Hungarian parliamentary election
- Icelandic presidential election
- Italian local elections
- Polish legislative election
- Portuguese presidential election
- Portuguese legislative election
- Romanian local elections
- Romanian parliamentary election
- Romanian presidential election
- 1980 Swiss referendums
- Turkish presidential election
- Umbrian regional election
- Venetian regional election

=== Germany ===
- West German federal election
- de:Landtagswahl in Baden-Württemberg 1980
- de:Landtagswahl im Saarland 1980

=== Spain ===
- Basque parliamentary election
- Catalan parliamentary election

=== United Kingdom ===
- 1980 Glasgow Central by-election
- 1980 Labour Party leadership election (UK)
- 1980 Southend East by-election

==== United Kingdom local ====
- 1980 United Kingdom local elections

===== English local =====
- 1980 Manchester Council election
- 1980 Trafford Council election
- 1980 Wolverhampton Council election

== North America ==
- 1980 Guatemalan vice presidential election
- 1980 Honduran Constituent Assembly election
- 1980 Panamanian parliamentary election

=== Canada ===
- 1980 Brantford municipal election
- 1980 Edmonton municipal election
- 1980 Canadian federal election
- 1980 Manitoba municipal elections
- 1980 Ontario municipal elections
- 1980 Ottawa municipal election
- 1980 Quebec independence referendum
- 1980 Toronto municipal election

=== Caribbean ===
- 1980 Anguillan general election
- 1980 Antigua and Barbuda general election
- 1980 Bermudian general election
- 1980 Caymanian general election
- 1980 Dominican general election
- 1980 Jamaican general election
- 1980 Puerto Rican general election
- 1980 Tobago House of Assembly election
- 1980 Turks and Caicos Islands general election

=== United States ===
- 1980 United States elections
- 1980 United States presidential election

==== United States lieutenant gubernatorial ====
- 1980 Delaware lieutenant gubernatorial election
- 1980 Missouri lieutenant gubernatorial election
- 1980 North Carolina lieutenant gubernatorial election

==== United States gubernatorial ====
- 1980 Arkansas gubernatorial election
- 1980 Delaware gubernatorial election
- 1980 Indiana gubernatorial election
- 1980 Missouri gubernatorial election
- 1980 Montana gubernatorial election
- 1980 New Hampshire gubernatorial election
- 1980 North Carolina gubernatorial election
- 1980 North Dakota gubernatorial election
- 1980 Rhode Island gubernatorial election
- 1980 United States gubernatorial elections
- 1980 Utah gubernatorial election
- 1980 Vermont gubernatorial election
- 1980 Washington gubernatorial election
- 1980 West Virginia gubernatorial election

==== United States House of Representatives ====
- 1980 United States House of Representatives elections
- 1980 United States House of Representatives election in Alaska
- 1980 United States House of Representatives election in Delaware
- 1980 United States House of Representatives election in Nevada
- 1980 United States House of Representatives election in North Dakota
- 1980 United States House of Representatives election in Vermont
- 1980 United States House of Representatives election in Wyoming

==== United States Senate ====
- 1980 United States Senate elections
- 1980 United States Senate election in Alabama
- 1980 United States Senate election in Alaska
- 1980 United States Senate election in Arizona
- 1980 United States Senate election in Arkansas
- 1980 United States Senate election in California
- 1980 United States Senate election in Colorado
- 1980 United States Senate election in Connecticut
- 1980 United States Senate election in Georgia
- 1980 United States Senate election in Hawaii
- 1980 United States Senate election in Idaho
- 1980 United States Senate election in Illinois
- 1980 United States Senate election in Indiana
- 1980 United States Senate election in Iowa
- 1980 United States Senate election in Kansas
- 1980 United States Senate election in Kentucky
- 1980 United States Senate election in Louisiana
- 1980 United States Senate election in Maryland
- 1980 United States Senate election in Missouri
- 1980 United States Senate election in New Hampshire
- 1980 United States Senate election in New York
- 1980 United States Senate election in North Carolina
- 1980 United States Senate election in North Dakota
- 1980 United States Senate election in Ohio
- 1980 United States Senate election in Oklahoma
- 1980 United States Senate election in Oregon
- 1980 United States Senate election in Pennsylvania
- 1980 United States Senate election in South Carolina
- 1980 United States Senate election in South Dakota
- 1980 United States Senate election in Utah
- 1980 United States Senate election in Vermont
- 1980 United States Senate election in Washington
- 1980 United States Senate election in Wisconsin

==== United States mayoral elections ====
- 1980 Auburn, Alabama municipal elections
- 1980 Orlando mayoral election
- 1980 Portland, Oregon mayoral election

== Oceania ==
- 1980 East Coast Bays by-election
- 1980 Nauruan parliamentary election
- 1980 Northern Maori by-election
- 1980 Onehunga by-election
- 1980 Palauan general election
- 1980 Palauan constitutional referendum
- 1980 Solomon Islands general election

=== Australia ===
- 1980 Australian federal election
- 1980 Bankstown state by-election
- 1980 Castlereagh state by-election
- 1980 Denison state by-election
- 1980 Ku-ring-gai state by-election
- 1980 Murray state by-election
- 1980 Northern Territory general election
- 1980 Norwood state by-election
- 1980 Queensland state election
- 1980 Western Australian state election

== South America ==
- 1980 Bolivian general election
- 1980 Chilean constitutional referendum
- 1980 Guyanese general election
- 1980 Peruvian general election
- 1980 Uruguayan constitutional referendum
