= Buck Olsen =

Canadian politician and land surveyor (1926–2020)

L. O. (Buck) Olsen

Member of the Edmonton City Council for Ward 4
- In office 1971–1977
- Preceded by: multiple, from 1968 Edmonton municipal election (Ward system was not in use)
- Succeeded by: Bettie Hewes, Ed Leger

Personal details
- Born: Lawrence Oliver Olsen; June 12, 1926 Saskatoon, Saskatchewan
- Died: August 10, 2020 (aged 94) Edmonton, Alberta, Canada
- Spouse: Audrey Dawson
- Children: 3
- Education: College of Engineering, University of Saskatchewan
- Occupation: land surveyor, engineer

Lawrence Oliver "Buck" Olsen (June 12, 1926 – August 10, 2020) was a Canadian politician and land surveyor in Edmonton, Alberta.

== Early life ==
Olsen was born in Saskatoon, Saskatchewan in 1926 to Edward Olai and Lillian (Lundberg) Olsen. After graduating from high school in Prince Albert, Saskatchewan, Olsen attended the Prince Albert Collegiate Institute and the University of Saskatchewan, graduating from the latter with a B.Sc. in civil engineering. After working in the engineering industry for around 10 years, Olsen then received his commission to be a land surveyor in the prairie provinces. He then formed and worked in his partnership, Hamilton & Olsen Surveying company. Olsen also served as president of the Alberta Land Surveying Association in 1959. He received an Outstanding Service Award from the same organization in 1980 as well as honorary lifetime membership in 1989. Olsen was also a member of the Saskatchewan Land Surveyors Association, retiring in January 1984.

Olsen was elected to the Edmonton City Council for Ward 4 in 1971, 1974 and 1977.

Olsen was a member of the Garneau United Church in Edmonton as well as the local Rotary Club. He married Audrey May Dawson in 1949 and with her had three children.
