= 1986 Edmonton municipal election =

Municipal election in Alberta, Canada

The 1986 municipal election was held October 20, 1986 to elect a mayor and twelve aldermen to sit on Edmonton City Council, nine trustees to sit on the public school board, and seven trustees to sit on the separate school board.

Party labels were dropped from the ballots by this time.

This was the last election in which school trustees were elected at large. Beginning in 1989, both districts introduced a ward system.

The fifty-seven candidates for the public school board remains the most in Edmonton's history.

== Electoral system ==
Mayor was elected through first past the post.

Councillors were elected through plurality block voting, two per ward, where each voter could cast up to two votes.

School board positions also were filled through plurality block voting as well.

== Voter turnout ==
There were 134020 ballots cast out of 396004 eligible voters, for a voter turnout of 33.8%.

== Results ==
(bold indicates elected, italics indicate incumbent)

=== Mayor ===
- **Laurence Decore** - 87939
- Buck Olsen - 39857
- Eddie Keehn - 1255
- Naseer Chaudhary - 1037
- Paul (Big Jim) Whitney - 704
- Harold Real - 396

=== Aldermen ===
==== Ward 1 ====
- **Bruce Campbell** - 10929
- **Helen Paull** - 10074
- Dan Backs - 6545
- Paul Norris - 5038
- Walter Coombs - 2320
- John Ludwig - 2104
- Mary Hislop-Perraton - 864
- Roxanne Herbert - 712
- Francis Dryden - 490

==== Ward 2 ====
- **Jan Reimer** - 14177
- **Ron Hayter** - 9733
- Gene Romaniuk - 6297
- Mike Fedoretz - 4181

==== Ward 3 ====
- **Judy Bethel** - 8779
- **Julian Kinisky** - 7812
- Joe Filewych - 4172
- Bill Kostiniuk - 3888
- John Strikwerda - 2994
- Kathy Kellman - 1872
- Mike Kachkar - 1309
- John Lakusta - 1306

==== Ward 4 ====
- **Lance White** - 7639
- **Mel Binder** - 6249
- Donna Artuso - 4823
- Alice Hanson - 4816
- Gerry Wright - 4256
- Ed Leger - 3579
- Ron Pilling - 1609
- Gordon Hum - 705
- Carl Byrd Williams - 260

==== Ward 5 ====
- **Lillian Staroszik** - 12753
- **Patricia MacKenzie** - 9052
- Wes Candler - 8429
- Donald Grimble - 5433
- Ross Brown - 4278
- Rom Smit - 875

==== Ward 6 ====
- **Terry Cavanagh** - 13990
- **Ken Kozak** - 9977
- Sheila McKay - 9809
- Wayne Weeks - 4301
- Ron Hodgins - 4077
- John Bracegirdle - 2120
- Eric Saemisch - 901
- Bill Gowan-Smith - 566
- Keith Adamson - 532

=== Public school trustees ===
Each voter could cast nine votes.

- **Joan Cowling** - 33370
- **Don Massey** - 29323
- **Elaine Jones** - 22878
- **Dick Mather** - 17878
- **Lila Fahlman** - 16613
- **Doug Tupper** - 12216
- **George Luck** - 12018
- **Leon Lubin** - 11876
- **Don Williams** - 11582
- Linda Girard - 10337
- Doug Elves - 10311
- Adelle Bellhouse - 10213
- Janice Drysdale - 9581
- Clarence Climenhaga - 9493
- John Lakusta - 9176
- Gordon Hum - 9123
- Jolly Drever - 8791
- Gerry Beck - 8533
- Marion Herbert - 8511
- Rose Rosenberger - 8501
- James Forbes - 8129
- Yvonne Mury - 7524
- Ninele Jackson - 7366
- Bruce Uditsky - 7147
- John Ludwig - 6985
- Howard Welch - 6727
- Joe Hak - 6523
- Arnold Holmes - 6389
- Olga Cyrulik - 6382
- Ronald Bellamy - 6203
- James Albers - 6024
- Claire Fisher - 5825
- Alex Kinasewich - 5687
- Joe Burgis - 5246
- Shona Wehm - 5092
- Adolph Feingold - 5063
- Norval Horner - 4948
- R Glenn Ritchie - 4799
- Don Cruse - 4767
- Richard Woodward - 4478
- Jack Broyles - 4202
- Alwyn Brightley - 4182
- Gurcharan Bhatia - 4010
- David Rand - 3819
- R Genis Bell - 3754
- Gordon Stamp - 3516
- Jeffrey Martin - 3492
- Bas Roopnarine - 3363
- Brian Morton - 3163
- Doug Lewis - 3005
- Jim Jacuta - 2982
- Harbans Dhillon - 2911
- Thomas Tomlinson - 2132
- Samir Ghossein - 1690
- Jack Thonger - 1622
- Brant Maidens - 1304
- A D Pirbhani - 1095

=== Separate (Catholic) school trustees ===
Each voter could cast seven votes (plurality block voting).

- **Catherine Chichak** - 18108
- **Alice Gagne** - 16267
- **Francis O'Hara** - 15558
- **Hugh Tadman** - 14191
- **Simone Demers-Secker** - 9807
- **Ken Alyluia** - 9628
- **Jim Shinkaruk** - 8716
- L Brian Mitchell - 8667
- Lenore Hopchin - 8598
- William Koehler - 7758
- Carl Amodio - 7206
- Joe Sell - 6606
