= 1977 Edmonton municipal election =

Municipal election in Alberta, Canada

The 1977 municipal election was held October 19, 1977 to elect a mayor and twelve aldermen to sit on Edmonton City Council, nine trustees to sit on the public school board, and seven trustees to sit on the separate school board.

This was the first election in which a nine-member public school board was elected instead of the seven member board that had previously existed.

It was also the last election to use only four wards for election of the city councillors. Beginning in 1980, two aldermen were elected from each of six wards.

== Electoral system ==
Mayor was elected through First past the post.

Councillors were elected three per ward, through Plurality block voting where each voter could cast up to three votes.

School board positions also were filled through Plurality block voting as well.

== Voter turnout ==
There were 116,525 ballots cast out of 305,342 eligible voters, for a voter turnout of 38.2%.

== Results ==
(bold indicates elected, italics indicate incumbent)

=== Mayor ===
Party	Candidate	Votes	%
**Independent**	**Cec Purves**	**38,720**	**33.92%**
Independent	Laurence Decore	29,682	26.00%
Independent	Terry Cavanagh	28,941	25.36%
Independent	Ivor Dent	13,818	12.11%
Revolutionary Workers League	Donald Tapscott	1,395	1.22%
Independent	Eddie Keehn	1,108	0.97%
Independent	John Horobec	479	0.42%

(William Hawrelak had been elected mayor in the 1974 election, but had died in office. Cavanagh was selected by council to replace him.)

=== Aldermen ===
Guide:

- E.C.G.A = Edmonton Civic Government Association
- E.V.A. = Edmonton Voters Association
- U.R.G.E. = Urban Reform Group Edmonton

Ward 1			Ward 2			Ward 3			Ward 4		
Party	Candidate	Votes	Party	Candidate	Votes	Party	Candidate	Votes	Party	Candidate	Votes
**U.R.G.E.**	**Lois Campbell**	**12,958**	**Ind.**	**Gene Dub**	**11,202**	**E.C.G.A**	**Ron Hayter**	**11,425**	**U.R.G.E.**	**Bettie Hewes**	**16,560**
**E.C.G.A**	**Kenneth Newman**	**14,619**	**E.C.G.A**	**Olivia Butti**	**10,553**	**Ind.**	**Ed Leger**	**10,760**	**E.C.G.A**	**William Chmiliar**	**14,473**
**E.C.G.A**	**Paul Norris**	**12,014**	**Ind.**	**Percy Wickman**	**8,755**	**U.R.G.E.**	**Edward Kennedy**	**9,957**	**E.C.G.A**	**Buck Olsen**	**14,090**
Ind.	Carl Paproski	11,926	U.R.G.E.	Gerry Wright	6,311	Ind.	David Stewart	6,342	Ind.	Sheila McKay	10,876
E.C.G.A	Bud Salloum	10,693	Ind.	Bob Caine	5,304	E.V.A.	Walter Doskoch	4,290	E.C.G.A	Darryl Smith	8,958
Ind.	Nick Fedorak	7,440	Ind.	Solomon Agronin	5,153	Ind.	Clarence (Chuck) Bolton	3,408	Ind.	Mitchell Wijcik	6,515
Ind.	Donald Eastcott	5,390	Ind.	Kenneth Burton	4,668	Ind.	Ernest Whitely	3,362	E.V.A.	Ed Ewasiuk	6,192
Ind.	Cal O'Brian	4,624	E.C.G.A	Ed Baxter	4,138				Ind.	John Lakusta	3,031
E.V.A.	Gerry Paschen	3,983	Ind.	Henry Rutkowski	3,167						
Ind.	Johannes Bosch	2,703	E.V.A.	Robert Blakely	2,867						
			Ind.	Olga Cylurik	1,870						
			E.V.A.	E. J. (Slim) Powell	1,800						
			Ind.	Richard Guthrie	1,171						

=== Public school trustees ===
- **Shirley Forbes** - 38468
- **Mel Binder** - 37438
- **Ernie Lund** - 35406
- **Jim Patrick** - 33618
- **Don Massey** - 33444
- **Catherine Ford** - 33170
- **Richard Jamieson** - 32371
- **James Falconer** - 31754
- **Elaine Jones** - 27494
- Lorne Mowers - 26792
- Vernon Johnson - 25896
- Douglas Sorenson - 24397
- Molly Glass - 21330
- John Mason - 16319
- Clare Brown - 16252

=== Separate (Catholic) school trustees ===
- **Leo Floyd** - 16438
- **Jean McDonald** - 15123
- **Barry Cavanaugh** - 11506
- **Phil Gibeau** - 11207
- **Laurier Picard** - 11071
- **Raymond Pinkowski** - 10342
- **Joe Donahue** - 9810
- William McNeill - 8664
- Zan Matishank - 8436
- Patrick Murphy - 7873
- Lyle Lavender - 7039
- John Kash - 6506
- Paul Haljan - 4659
