= 1989 Edmonton municipal election =

Municipal election in Alberta, Canada

The Edmonton municipal election, 1989 was held on October 16 that year to elect a mayor and twelve aldermen to sit on Edmonton City Council, nine trustees to sit on the public school board, and seven trustees to sit on the separate school board. Edmontonians also voted in the Senate nominee election in conjunction with the municipal election.

This was the first election in which school trustees were elected by ward.

== Voter turnout ==
There were 148068 ballots cast out of 406995 eligible voters, for a voter turnout of 36.4%.

== Results ==
(bold indicates elected, italics indicate incumbent)

=== Mayor ===
| Party | Candidate | Votes | % |
|---|---|---|---|
| **Independent** | **Jan Reimer** | **73,728** | **50.09%** |
| Independent | Terry Cavanagh | 33,710 | 22.90% |
| Independent | Don Hamilton | 31,483 | 21.39% |
| Independent | Terence Harding | 7,156 | 4.86% |
| Independent | Naseer Chaudhary | 542 | 0.37% |
| Independent | Carl Williams | 449 | 0.31% |
| Independent | H. Campion Swartout | 126 | 0.09% |

(Laurence Decore was elected mayor in the 1986 election, but resigned to lead the Liberal Party of Alberta. Cavanagh was selected by council to serve as his replacement.)

=== Aldermen ===
Each ward elects two councillors. Voters can cast one or two votes (plurality block voting).

| Ward 1 | | | Ward 2 | | | Ward 3 | | |
| Party | Candidate | Votes | Party | Candidate | Votes | Party | Candidate | Votes |
|---|---|---|---|---|---|---|---|---|
| **Independent** | **Bruce Campbell** | **11,864** | **Independent** | **Ron Hayter** | **12,939** | **Independent** | **Judy Bethel** | **10,805** |
| **Independent** | **Helen Paull** | **10,582** | **Independent** | **Catherine Chichak** | **7,503** | **E.V.A.** | **Brian Mason** | **8,992** |
| Independent | Alice Gagne | 9,552 | E.V.A. | Gene Romaniuk | 6,164 | Independent | Ed Gibbons | 4,852 |
| Independent | Richard Kayler | 5,297 | Independent | Bill Maxim | 5,366 | Independent | Cindy Olsen | 4,275 |
| Independent | Al Wilson | 3,532 | Independent | Phyllis Basaraba | 5,020 | Independent | Margaret Stumbourg | 4,097 |
| Independent | Timothy Casey | 1,606 | Independent | Gerry Beck | 1,555 | Independent | Ernst Eder | 3,214 |
| Independent | Richard Guyon | 1,339 | Independent | Jim Hoyda | 1,099 | Independent | George Butler | 2,650 |
| | | | Independent | Alwyn Brightley | 1,067 | Independent | Bonny Royce | 593 |
| | | | Independent | Rino Filippelli | 1,036 | Independent | Hans Slaby | 440 |
| | | | Independent | Michael Bulat | 655 | | | |
| | | | Independent | Thomas Tomlinson | 636 | | | |
| Ward 4 | | | Ward 5 | | | Ward 6 | | |
| Party | Candidate | Votes | Party | Candidate | Votes | Party | Candidate | Votes |
| **Independent** | **Lance White** | **12,831** | **Independent** | **Patricia MacKenzie** | **16,671** | **Independent** | **Sheila McKay** | **12,895** |
| **Independent** | **Mel Binder** | **12,588** | **Independent** | **Lillian Staroszik** | **15,977** | **Independent** | **Ken Kozak** | **9,836** |
| Independent | Tooker Gomberg | 8,109 | Independent | Dan McMann | 7,717 | Independent | Debby Carlson | 8,284 |
| Independent | Perry Dane | 3,080 | Independent | Ian Crawford | 6,337 | Independent | Bill Diachuk | 7,555 |
| | | | Independent | Margaret Durnin | 4,286 | Independent | John Bracegirdle | 4,492 |
| | | | | | | E.V.A. | Elaine Masur-Mardiros | 3,944 |

=== Public school trustees ===
One trustee is elected from each ward. Additional trustees are elected by taking the non-victorious candidate with the most votes between each of Wards 1 and 4, Wards 2 and 3, and Ward 5 and 6.

| Ward 1 | | | | Ward 2 | | | | Ward 3 | | | |
| Party | Candidate | Votes | % | Party | Candidate | Votes | % | Party | Candidate | Votes | % |
|---|---|---|---|---|---|---|---|---|---|---|---|
| **Independent** | **Joan Cowling** | **8,333** | **52.49%** | **Independent** | **Rose Rosenberger** | **7,725** | **57.53%** | **Independent** | **John Nicoll** | **7,422** | **58.21%** |
| **Independent** | **Esther Starkman** | **3,253** | **20.49%** | Independent | Joe Hak | 3,472 | 25.86% | **Independent** | **Larry Phillips** | **5,328** | **41.79%** |
| Independent | Ed Pearson | 1,766 | 11.13% | Independent | Victor Varvis | 2,230 | 16.61% | | | | |
| Independent | Raymond Marshall | 1,588 | 10.00% | | | | | | | | |
| Independent | Ross Patchell | 934 | 5.88% | | | | | | | | |
| Ward 4 | | | | Ward 5 | | | | Ward 6 | | | |
| Party | Candidate | Votes | % | Party | Candidate | Votes | % | Party | Candidate | Votes | % |
| **Independent** | **Don Williams** | **5,014** | **37.37%** | **Independent** | **George Luck** | **6,947** | **36.54%** | **Independent** | **Doug Tupper** | **7,093** | **39.11%** |
| Independent | Hilary Findlay | 2,869 | 21.38% | Independent | Michael Ekelund | 4,902 | 25.78% | **Independent** | **Dick Mather** | **5,805** | **32.01%** |
| Independent | Marion Herbert | 2,702 | 20.14% | Independent | Gene Hartson | 3,096 | 16.28% | E.V.A. | Mike Uhryn | 2,702 | 14.90% |
| Independent | Mitch Bronaugh | 1,683 | 12.54% | Independent | Indira Puri | 2,554 | 13.43% | Independent | Gordon Hum | 1,704 | 9.40% |
| Independent | Perry Dane | 885 | 6.60% | Independent | Julio Ferrante | 1,513 | 7.96% | Independent | John Kurian | 830 | 4.58% |
| Independent | Adil Pirbhai | 264 | 1.97% | | | | | | | | |

=== Separate (Catholic) school trustees ===
One trustee is elected from each ward, and the non-victorious candidate with the most total votes is also elected. Day was elected as second member for Ward 1.

| Ward 1 | | | | Ward 2 | | | | Ward 3 | | | |
| Party | Candidate | Votes | % | Party | Candidate | Votes | % | Party | Candidate | Votes | % |
|---|---|---|---|---|---|---|---|---|---|---|---|
| **Independent** | **David MacDougall** | **3,357** | **58.92%** | **Independent** | **Tony Catena** | **Acclaimed** | | **Independent** | **Mary-Anne Razzolini** | **2,883** | **42.22%** |
| **Independent** | **John Patrick Day** | **2,341** | **41.08%** | | | | | Independent | Jim Shinkaruk | 1,802 | 26.39% |
| | | | | | | | | Independent | Ken Balko | 1,147 | 16.80% |
| | | | | | | | | Independent | Gerald Lorente | 997 | 14.60% |
| Ward 4 | | | | Ward 5 | | | | Ward 6 | | | |
| Party | Candidate | Votes | % | Party | Candidate | Votes | % | Party | Candidate | Votes | % |
| **Independent** | **Krystina Tadman** | **Acclaimed** | | **Independent** | **Ernie Turnbull** | **3,373** | **62.60%** | **Independent** | **Joan Tarnowski** | **4,560** | **71.29%** |
| | | | | Independent | Sadie Clancy | 2,015 | 37.40% | Independent | Ken Alyluia | 1,836 | 28.71% |

=== Senate Nominee Election ===
This was a province-wide election. Results below reflect only Edmonton vote totals; provincially, Stan Waters was elected (see 1989 Alberta Senate nominee election for province-wide results).

| Party | Candidate | Votes | % |
|---|---|---|---|
| Liberal | Bill Code | 46,452 | 34.07% |
| Reform | **Stan Waters** | **41,987** | **30.79%** |
| Progressive Conservative | Bert Brown | 18,911 | 13.87% |
| Independent | Kenneth Paproski | 15,982 | 11.72% |
| Independent | Gladys Taylor | 7,081 | 5.19% |
| Independent | Tom Sindlinger | 5,934 | 4.35% |
