= 1992 Edmonton municipal election =

Municipal election in Alberta, Canada

The 1992 municipal election was held on October 22, 1992, to elect a mayor and twelve aldermen to sit on Edmonton City Council, nine trustees to sit on the public school board, and seven trustees to sit on the separate school board. Edmontonians also voted on one plebiscite question.

== Voter turnout ==
A total of 215,556 ballots were cast out of 417,271 eligible voters, resulting in a voter turnout of 51.7%.

== Results ==
(bold indicates elected, italics indicate incumbent)

=== Mayor ===
Candidate	Votes	%
**Jan Reimer**	**113,085**	**52.94%**
Bill Smith	90,147	42.20%
Ken Kozak	3,938	1.84%
Alan Cruikshank	2,765	1.29%
James Steinhubl	2,115	0.99%
Bob Ligertwood	1,563	0.73%

=== Aldermen ===
Two councillors were elected in each ward through block voting.

Four women and eight men were elected as city councillors.

Ward 1		Ward 2		Ward 3		Ward 4		Ward 5		Ward 6	
Candidate	Votes	Candidate	Votes	Candidate	Votes	Candidate	Votes	Candidate	Votes	Candidate	Votes
**Leroy Chahley**	**20,377**	**Ron Hayter**	**16,606**	**Brian Mason**	**23,769**	**Michael Phair**	**9,367**	**Patricia MacKenzie**	**20,074**	**Sheila McKay**	**20,168**
**Bruce Campbell**	**14,465**	**Allan Bolstad**	**10,228**	**Judy Bethel**	**20,075**	**Tooker Gomberg**	**8,681**	**Lillian Staroszik**	**18,535**	**Terry Cavanagh**	**18,868**
Joan Cowling	14,247	Lori Hall	9,674	Jerry Kitt	5,035	Jane Batty	8,457	Don Grimble	9,087	Riaz Choudhry	10,195
Helen Nolan	7,734	Bill Maxim	7,266	Ernie Hagen	4,774	Terence Harding	8,173	Don McMann	8,693	Dave Thiele	9,199
Thomas Olenuk	5,730	Richard Awid	6,730	Dwayne Kwolick	3,823	Janice Fleming	3,319	Bob Caine	7,027	Ian Crawford	5,515
Lloyd Mildon	5,206	Catherine Chichak	4,856	Thomas Tomlinson	3,503	Randy Hogle	3,128	Bill Schlacht	2,588	Art Clarke	3,276
		Lorne Phillips	2,571			Mike Norris	2,608	Olga Cylurik	2,012	Dave Bains	3,102
		Earl Caswell	2,552			Lila Fahlman	2,211	Doug Pruden	1,949	Robert Alford	2,085
		Gerry Beck	1,841			John Lakusta	1,652				
		George Niven	1,620			Nikki Allan	1,649				
						Joan Gibson	1368				
						Bill Miller	1108				
						Perry Dane	858				
						Randall Chase	746				

=== Public school trustees ===
One trustee is elected from each ward. Additional trustees are elected by selecting the non-victorious candidate with the most votes between Wards 1 and 4, Wards 2 and 3, and Wards 5 and 6. The top vote-getters among the runners-up were Starkman, Hahn, and Tupper.

==== Ward 1 ====
- **Jean Woodrow** - 8661
- **Esther Starkman** - 6030
- Leon Lubin - 4743
- Neil Findlay - 2250
- Adrian Greenwood - 1811
- Rainer Ebel - 1260

==== Ward 2 ====
Rose Rosenberger was acclaimed.

==== Ward 3 ====
- **John Nicoll** - 6174
- **Christine Hahn** - 4402
- Terry Sulyma - 3869
- Larry Phillips - 2498
- Denis Wall - 2099
- Paul Early - 1249

==== Ward 4 ====
- **Don Williams** - 5014
- Mimi Williams - 4362
- Gord Stamp - 3920
- Richard Gunderson - 3724

==== Ward 5 ====
- **George Nicholson** - 12955
- Michael Ekelund - 4721
- Reginald Berry - 3025
- Rob Galbraith - 2345
- Raj Shorey - 1475
- David Salsbury - 1301

==== Ward 6 ====
- **Dick Mather** - 8710
- **Doug Tupper** - 8346
- Cori Doering 6880
- Gordon Hum - 3199

=== Separate (Catholic) school trustees ===
One trustee is elected from each of the six wards, and the top vote-getter among the runners-up from all the wards is elected as the trustee-at-large.

==== Ward 1 ====
- **David MacDougall** - 3357
- Andy Anderson - 2874
- John Patrick Day - 2341

==== Ward 2 ====
- **Ronald Zapisocki** - 3539
- Tony Catena - 2517
- Eileen Ostapiw - 1662
- Brent Achtymichuk - 1457
- Al Hoven - 1434
- Ramon Caluttung - 1063

==== Ward 3 ====
- **Mary-Anne Razzolini** - 5839
- **Jim Shinkaruk** - 3142
- Noel Salaysay - 1362

==== Ward 4 ====
- **Ron Patsula** - 2764
- Krystina Tadman - 2516
- Mervin Prediger - 1193

==== Ward 5 ====
- **James Bateman** - 1959
- Mona-Lee Feehan - 1752
- Erin Inglis - 1622
- Gerald Archibald - 1323
- Guy Tessier - 488

==== Ward 6 ====
- **Brian Mitchell** - 2677
- Betty McNamee - 2182
- Barbara Ann Thompson - 1767
- Fred Zimmerman - 1254
- Sheila Cerhit - 828

=== Municipal Airport Plebiscite ===
Are you in favor of Bylaw No. 10,205, the Edmonton Municipal Airport Referendum Bylaw?

- **Yes** - 115773
- No - 90566
