= Terry Cavanagh (politician) =

Canadian politician (1926–2017)

29th Mayor of Edmonton
- In office November 14, 1975 – October 19, 1977
- Preceded by: William Hawrelak
- Succeeded by: Cec Purves
- In office October 17, 1988 – October 16, 1989
- Preceded by: Laurence Decore
- Succeeded by: Jan Reimer

Alderman/Councillor on the Edmonton City Council (Ward 6)
- In office October 22, 1992 – October 15, 2007 Serving with Sheila McKay (1992–1995), Dick Mather (1995–1997), and Dave Thiele (1998-2007)
- Preceded by: Ken Kozak, Sheila McKay
- Succeeded by: Amarjeet Sohi, Dave Thiele
- In office October 17, 1983 – 1988 Serving with Bettie Hewes (1983–1984) and Ken Kozak (1984–1988)
- Preceded by: Bettie Hewes, Ed Leger
- Succeeded by: Ken Kozak, Sheila McKay

Alderman on the Edmonton City Council (Ward 4)
- In office October 13, 1971 – November 1975 Serving with Una Evans and Buck Olsen (1971–1974), and Bettie Hewes and Buck Olsen (1974–1975)
- Preceded by: New district
- Succeeded by: William Chmiliar, Bettie Hewes, Buck Olsen

Personal details
- Born: Terence James Cavanagh; July 19, 1926 Edmonton, Alberta, Canada
- Died: December 17, 2017 (aged 91) Edmonton, Alberta, Canada
- Party: Independent
- Spouse: June Gould (m. 1948; died 2016)
- Children: 3
- Profession: Businessman

Terence James Cavanagh (/ˈkævənɑː/ KAV-ə-nah; July 19, 1926 – December 17, 2017) was a Canadian politician, municipal councillor in Edmonton, Alberta, who served as mayor. He was Edmonton's first native-born mayor.

== Early life ==
Cavanagh was born in Edmonton on July 19, 1926, to recent Scottish immigrants. He attended high school in Edmonton before moving to Galt, Ontario to play hockey for the Galt Red Wings of the Ontario Hockey Association, where he was a teammate of Gordie Howe. Later in life, Cavanagh decorated his office with a large, signed photo of Howe.

After stints with the Dallas Texans of the United States Hockey League, the Valleyfield Braves of the Quebec Senior Hockey League, and the Los Angeles Ramblers and the Trail Smoke Eaters of the Western International Hockey League, he retired from hockey and found employment in the purchasing department of Consolidated Mining and Smelting Co. in Trail, British Columbia.

Cavanagh married June Gould on April 12, 1948. The couple had three children. June served as an Edmonton alderman from 1980 to 1983 for Ward 3.

In 1957, Cavanagh returned to Edmonton to work as the purchasing manager for Premier Steel Mills Ltd. He stayed on when the company was taken over by Stelco Steel in 1962, and remained in the position until 1977.

== Political career ==
=== Early career and hiatus ===
Cavanagh entered politics during the 1968 Edmonton election, when he ran for Edmonton City Council as an alderman. He was defeated, finishing fourteenth of thirty-two candidates in an election in which the top twelve were elected.

He was more successful during the 1971 election; Edmonton had adopted a ward system (in which three aldermen were elected in each of four wards) to replace the previous at-large method of election, and Cavanagh placed second of seventeen candidates in Ward 4. He was re-elected in the 1974 election, when he placed first of nine candidates.

On November 7, 1975, mayor William Hawrelak died in office. After nine ballots, Council chose Cavanagh over Laurence Decore to serve out his term, but when ran to retain the position in the 1977 election, he finished third, nearly ten thousand votes behind victor Cec Purves and under a thousand behind Decore (he did finish well ahead of former mayor Ivor Dent, however). He stayed out of politics for six years following this defeat, serving as chair of the Government of Alberta's Alberta Rent Decontrol Appeal Board (tasked with the elimination of provincial rent controls) from 1977–80 and as a communications advisor for the Alberta Energy Company Ltd. from 1980–84.

He rejected overtures from Neil Stanley Crawford to run for the Legislative Assembly of Alberta as a Progressive Conservative, commenting later that he had little interest in sitting as a backbencher after serving as mayor of Edmonton, and that Premier Peter Lougheed had not been prepared to promise him a cabinet position.

=== Return to council ===
He returned to Council after the 1983 election, when he finished second of eight candidates in Ward 6 (Edmonton's ward system had been revised such that there were two aldermen elected from each of six wards). He was re-elected in the 1986 election, placing first of nine candidates.

In 1988, Decore (who had been elected mayor in 1983) resigned to take a position as leader of the Alberta Liberal Party. Again Council chose Cavanagh to serve as interim mayor, and again he was defeated soundly when he sought re-election - this time, he finished with fewer than half the votes of Jan Reimer during the 1989 municipal election.

He won his old aldermanic seat back in the 1992 election, and he was re-elected in the 1995, 1998, 2001, and 2004 elections. In May 2007, Cavanagh announced that he would not seek election in the 2007 municipal election.

=== Political views, initiatives, and reputation ===
Cavanagh had excellent ties with Edmonton's immigrant and especially Chinese communities. Members of the Chinese community threw him a dinner for his eightieth birthday, and he claims that he can say "vote for me" in "15 or 17 languages".

He was an advocate for the development of Edmonton's North Saskatchewan River valley as a park area, despite the fact that he is not generally known as an environmentalist. Cavanagh also played a significant role in having the Fairmont Hotel Macdonald designated a Municipal Heritage Resource in 1985, saving it from destruction. In 2015, a meeting room in the hotel was named after him with his family donating a portrait of Cavanagh to hang in it.

Despite his experience in removing rent controls during the 1970s, he urged Alberta Premier Ed Stelmach to consider reintroducing them during Alberta's recent economic boom and accompanying tight housing market.

== Personal life and extra-political involvement ==
Cavanagh was a communications instructor, and taught courses on the subject at Victoria Composite High School, the Northern Alberta Institute of Technology (where he also taught a purchasing management course), and the University of Alberta's Faculty of Extension. He also taught a government relations course at Grant MacEwan College.

Cavanagh died in December 2017 at the age of 91.

== Bibliography ==
- Terry Cavanagh profile Edmonton City Council (retrieved August 14, 2007)
- Edmonton Public Library biography of Terry Cavanagh
- Biographical information and career statistics from The Internet Hockey Database
- "Budgeting Time", Real Estate Weekly, November 23, 2006
- "Keep rent-control plan alive, say councillors", Edmonton Journal, May 6, 2007
- "Edmonton then, Edmonton now", Edmonton Journal, June 23, 2007 (reproduced on connect2edmonton.ca)

Political offices
Preceded by William Hawrelak	Mayor of Edmonton; 1975–1977	Succeeded by Cecil John Harry Purves
Preceded by Laurence G. Decore	Mayor of Edmonton; 1988–1989	Succeeded by Janice Rhea Reimer
