= 1968 Edmonton municipal election =

Municipal election in Alberta, Canada

The 1968 Edmonton municipal election was held on October 16, 1968, to elect a mayor and twelve aldermen to sit on Edmonton City Council and seven trustees to sit on each of the public and separate school boards. The electorate also decided three plebiscite questions.

On May 2, 1968, the Legislative Assembly of Alberta passed the Municipal Elections Act. this Act had three major effects: first, it standardized municipal terms as being three years in all Alberta municipalities. Second, it standardized the date on which municipal elections in Alberta would be held – the nomination deadline would be the third Monday of September and the election would be four weeks later. Third, it allowed for the election of aldermen by ward, rather than at large, if preferred by the city or town.

This election was conducted under the new Act, and included a plebiscite to move to a ward system. A majority of the electorate voted for the change, and the 1968 election was the last in which aldermen were elected at large. (A 1970 by-election, held after the death of councillor Julia Kiniski, was held before the ward system was put into use in the 1971 election. The by-election elected one alderman at large.)

In addition to choosing members for City Council, citizens were asked to vote on three plebiscites. One plebiscite was on whether to switch to wards for election of city councillors. Another was whether or not council should have control over hours of operation of retail stores.

One plebiscite was related to a question rejected by voters in 1963, asking if the city should purchase land and build a combined sports and convention complex. The 1968 plebiscite saw voters agree to "construction of a Trade Convention and Sports Complex" in downtown Edmonton. Two years later, voters later rejected the specific, 50% more costly, Omniplex project plebiscite. The single-site sports and convention concept was later served by the distributed Northlands Coliseum (opened 1974), Commonwealth Stadium (1978), and Edmonton Convention Centre (1983, a few metres south of the 1963 site).

== Voter turnout ==
There were 93,129 ballots cast out of 238,828 eligible voters, for a voter turnout of 39%.

== Results ==
(bold indicates elected, italics indicate incumbent)

=== Mayor ===
- **Ivor Dent** – 34,722
- Reginald Easton – 27,365
- John Leslie Bodie – 26,951

=== Aldermen ===
Voters could cast up to 12 votes. 822,000 votes were marked. The successful candidates received about 470,000 votes. The two most popular candidates were the choice of a majority of voters.

Elected

- **Morris Weinlos** – 49,527
- **James Bateman** – 45,685 (his family ran a chain of grocery stores)
- **Una Evans** – 44,025 (reformer, husband was Art Evans, Edmonton Journal writer
- **Ed Leger** – 42,636
- **Cec Purves** – 40,699
- **Neil Crawford** – 39,190 (later Conservative MLA)
- **Kenneth Newman** – 37,607
- **Ches Tanner** – 36,191
- **Julia Kiniski** – 35,760
- **Terry Nugent** – 34,451
- **Kathleen McCallum** – 34,059
- **David Ward** – 29,770

Not elected

- Bev Booker – 29,652
- Terry Cavanagh – 28,981
- Norbert Berkowitz – 28,394
- Pat Shewchuk – 26,395
- Catherine Chichak – 24,835
- G Dale Newcombe – 24,403
- Bill McLean – 24,185
- Don Ross – 21,837
- Ron Hayter – 21,511
- G A (Pat) O'Hara – 18,310
- A Terry Laing – 16,155
- Lila Fahlman – 15,485
- John Matlock – 12,543
- John Lakusta – 11,965
- Douglas Tomlinson – 10,189 (member of the Communist Party)
- Charles Jenkins – 9543
- Walter Makowecki – 7962
- Wilson Arthur Stewart – 7951
- Bernard Mazurewicz – 6848
- Abner Abraham Rubin – 5339

=== Public school trustees ===
Each voter could cast up to seven votes (plurality block voting).

Party	Candidate	Votes	Elected
Better Education Association	Jackson Willis	38,496	✓
Better Education Association	John Bracco	31,844	✓
Quality Education Council	Edith Rogers	29,404	✓
Independent	Vernon Johnson	28,860	✓
Better Education Association	Milton Lazerte	27,422	✓
Better Education Association	Warren Edward (Ted) Smith	25,922	✓
Better Education Association	Lois Campbell	23,976	✓
Quality Education Council	Richard Jamieson	17,981	
Better Education Association	David Ellis	16,578	
Better Education Association	Alan Robertson	16,419	
Independent	Jean O'Hara	15,704	
Quality Education Council	Robert Dunseith	14,346	
Independent	Dorothy Preston	12,389	
Quality Education Council	Joseph Boehm	10,388	
Independent	Don McMillan	9,439	
Quality Education Council	Albert Bourcier	9,378	
Quality Education Council	John Poppit	6,739	
Independent	William Chomyn	6,522	
Independent	Laura Tuomi	5,791	
Quality Education Council	John Fuga	5,744	
Independent	Paul Fuog	3,943	

=== Separate (Catholic) school trustees ===
Each voter could cast up to seven votes (plurality block voting).

Party	Candidate	Votes	Elected
Independent	Georges Brosseau	11,893	✓
Independent	Jean Forest	9,681	✓
Independent	Robert Sabourin	9,175	✓
Independent	Bob Neville	8,853	✓
Independent	Bill Diachuk	8,520	✓
Independent	Larry Messier	8,310	✓
Independent	Jean McDonald	8,225	✓
Independent	Paul Norris	7,864	
Independent	B. J. Gagnon	7,041	
Independent	Morris Bahry	7,023	
Independent	D. A. McKay	6,657	
Independent	Cece Primeau	6,645	

=== Plebiscites ===
==== Ward System ====
Are you in favour of the City being divided into areas known as wards, of not less than three (3) and not more than ten (10) in number for the holding of elections of Alderman to City Council at future elections?

- **Yes** – 45,938
- No – 28,594

==== Convention and Sports Complex ====
Do you favour the construction of a Trade Convention and Sports Complex containing facilities such as a covered Football stadium and Ice Arena, and a Trade & Convention Centre, at an estimated capital cost of Twenty-three Million Dollars ($23,000,000.00) and to be operated at an estimated annual deficit of not more than two million?

- **Yes** – 57568
- No – 21458

==== Council Control of Store Hours ====
Do you want shop hours in the City of Edmonton to be controlled by City Council?

- Yes – 24672
- **No** – 55489

If shop hours are controlled, which do you favour: (a.) six days and two evenings – 58533 (b.) five days and two evenings – 8539 (c.) five and one-half days and one evening – 11776
