= Sheila McKay =

Canadian politician

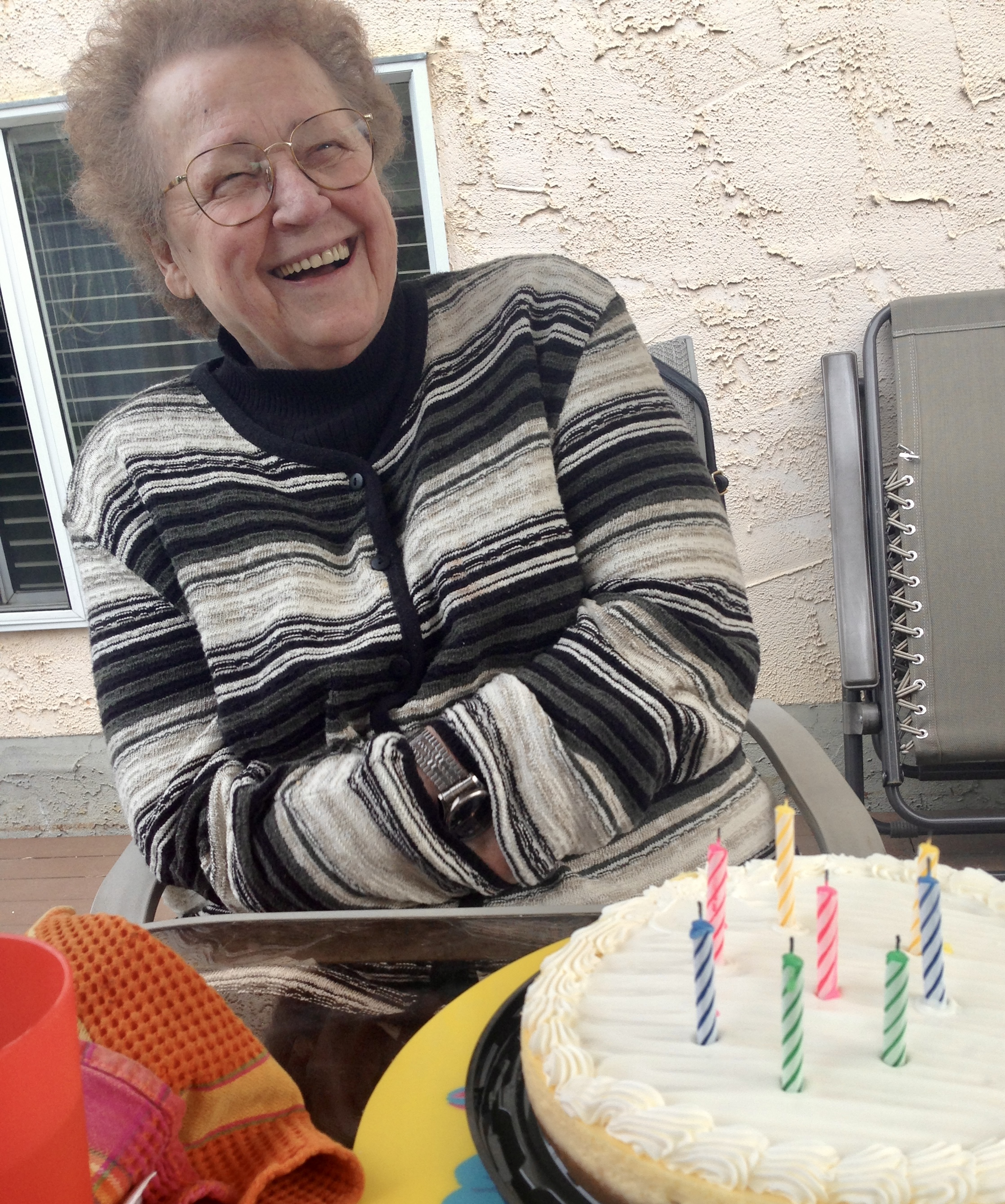
- Sheila McKay on her 78th Birthday, June 7, 2014

Member of the Edmonton City Council for Ward 6
- In office 1989–1995
- Preceded by: Terry Cavanagh, Dick Mather
- Succeeded by: Terry Cavanagh, Ken Kozak

Personal details
- Born: June 7, 1936 Edmonton, Alberta
- Died: November 2, 2021 (aged 85)
- Spouse: Murray McKay
- Children: Murray McKay, Molly Stolz, Johnny McKay, Cory McKay
- Occupation: Registered Nurse

Sheila Helen McKay (born June 7, 1936) is a retired Canadian politician who served on the Edmonton City Council from 1989 to 1995.

== Early life ==
McKay was born in Edmonton, Alberta. After graduating from Westglen High School, she went on to become a nurse, after attending the Misercordia Hospital School of Nursing. She has worked at the Misercordia Hospital in Edmonton in the emergency and intensive care wards.

== Political career ==
After unsuccessful elections in 1974, 1977, 1980, and 1986, she was elected to Edmonton City Council in the 1989 Edmonton municipal election and re-elected again in the 1992 Edmonton municipal election. She held a seat in Ward 6 from 1989 to 1995. During her time on council, she notoriously dumped a pitcher of water over the head of alderman Brian Mason during a heated dispute. She later blamed her actions in part on Mayor Jan Reimer's failure to censure Mason for telling her to "shut up". McKay was ejected from the chamber for her actions.

She ran unsuccessfully in the 1995, 1998, 2007 and 2010 elections.

She is married to Murray McKay and has four children.
