= Jan Reimer =

Canadian politician (born 1952)

Janice Rhea Reimer

32nd Mayor of Edmonton
- In office October 16, 1989 – October 16, 1995
- Preceded by: Terry Cavanagh
- Succeeded by: Bill Smith

City of Edmonton Alderman
- In office October 15, 1980 – October 16, 1989 Serving with Ron Hayter
- Preceded by: New district
- Succeeded by: Catherine Chichak
- Constituency: Ward 2

Personal details
- Born: May 23, 1952 (age 74) Edmonton, Alberta
- Party: Urban Reform Group Edmonton
- Spouse: Hubert Kammerer
- Children: Megan Kammerer; Jeffrey Kammerer
- Education: University of Alberta

Janice Rhea Reimer (born May 23, 1952) is a Canadian politician and the first female mayor of Edmonton, Alberta, having served in that capacity from 1989 until 1995. Highlights of her time in office included the inception of a new waste management system (which included curbside pickup of recyclables) and repeated efforts by Peter Pocklington, owner of the Edmonton Oilers, to secure concessions from the city in exchange for his agreement not to move the team. Although she has never sought office at the provincial or federal levels, she is a lifelong New Democrat.

== Early life ==
Reimer was born in Edmonton in 1952, the daughter of Neil Reimer, who would go on to lead the Alberta New Democratic Party. In 1973, she graduated with a Bachelor of Arts from the University of Alberta. After graduation, she spent three years travelling in Southeast Asia, Australia, and India (serving as a welfare officer in Darwin and Brisbane, Australia from 1975 until 1977). In 1977, she returned to Edmonton, and became the citizens' coordinator of the Calder Action Committee, a neighbourhood advocacy association.

== Politics ==
=== Alderman ===
Reimer first sought office in the 1980 municipal election, in which she finished second of eight candidates for alderman in the city's Ward 1, behind incumbent Ron Hayter. As two candidates were elected per ward, this showing was good enough for her to be elected to the Edmonton City Council. She was re-elected in 1983 and 1986, finishing first in fields of six and four, respectively. (Hayter finished second each time and due to the two-seat ward, also was elected each time.)

As an alderman, Reimer was an outspoken critic of many elements of the status quo. She argued that too many concessions were made to land development companies by the city, and also questioned why developers often failed to fulfill the conditions on which council made these concessions contingent. She was critical of council's habit of making important decisions in camera. When the city's solicitor resigned due to a sexual harassment scandal, and council negotiated a $160,000 settlement with him, Reimer expressed frustration that the city's law department was not under the jurisdiction of the city manager, where she felt that the settlement would have been better-handled. She also argued that Edmonton's 1979 annexation of surrounding semi-rural land had been a mistake, asserting that it "[hadn't] benefited Edmonton at all; we'll be paying years down the road for road maintenance and snow clearing in the new areas".

As an alderman, Reimer supported changing aldermen's titles to "councillor", stating that while the title didn't offend her, it should be changed out of respect for others' sensibilities. Early in her third term, she and Hayter jointly called for reform of Edmonton's ward system – specifically, Reimer supported increasing the number of wards from six to twelve and halving the number of aldermen per ward to one. The proposal was defeated, in part because Mayor Laurence Decore said he thought the reform wasn't needed. (The change would finally be made in 2010.)

Reimer also supported increases in aldermanic salaries, suggesting that they had to work harder than members of the Legislative Assembly of Alberta since aldermen need to learn issues themselves and can't fall back on a party platform.

=== 1989 election ===
In 1988, mayor Laurence Decore resigned to lead the Alberta Liberal Party, and Terry Cavanagh was selected by council to complete his term. Reimer challenged Cavanagh's bid to keep the job in the 1989 election. The campaign was acrimonious: Cavanagh called Reimer's endorsement by the Canadian Union of Public Employees a "blatant attempt to muscle votes for an opponent," and suggested that Reimer harboured a "socialist hidden agenda" and that the city would become known as "Redmonton" if she was elected.

Reimer won a solid victory although with barely more than half the votes cast.

The cost of Reimer's campaign, just over $139,000, was one of the lowest of any successful mayoral candidate in recent times. Despite the lack of municipal campaign finance rules at the time, Reimer voluntarily refused to accept donations of more than $3,750, and disclosed all donations above $375. She chose $375, the requirement in provincial elections, rather than $100, the requirement in federal elections, in the hopes that it would be more likely to entice her opponents to follow suit; however, none did.

=== Mayor ===
Reimer entered office with an ambitious agenda, but she was unable to implement much of it due to a fractured city council. Notoriously, alderman Sheila McKay dumped a pitcher of water over the head of alderman Brian Mason during one heated dispute; McKay later blamed her actions in part on Reimer's failure to censure Mason (who later was an NDP MLA and provincial cabinet minister) for telling her to "shut up".

Faced with a divided and at times hostile city council, Reimer attempted to advance much of her agenda in the council's Executive Committee but was criticized for this by alderman and former ally Patricia MacKenzie, who alleged that Reimer was attempting to disempower council. Council further impeded her ability to implement her agenda by changing the rules such that the chairs standing committees were elected by standing committees rather than appointed by the mayor; Reimer considered using the mayor's ex-officio status as a member of every standing committee to show up and vote for her preferred candidate, but ultimately decided that "it was best they try to sort it out among themselves."

Reimer tried to improve relations with both the Conservative provincial government, whose relations with Edmonton were strained after fifteen of the city's seventeen seats in the Legislative Assembly of Alberta had gone to opposition parties (NDP and Liberal) in the 1989 provincial election. She resumed the deprecated tradition of having the council meet periodically with the city's government caucus (though the caucus consisted only of Nancy Betkowski and Doug Main). She also tried to build bridges with rival Calgary, meeting early with its mayor Al Duerr and proclaiming after the meeting that competition between the cities, while inevitable, "should be healthy and based on cities' strengths instead of...running down the other city."

As the city's first social democratic mayor since Ivor Dent left office in 1974, Reimer pursued a number of left-wing initiatives, some of which earned her criticism. In a controversial move, she refused to wear the city's ceremonial chain of office, which was made from a beaver pelt. She instructed the city administration to develop a strategy to recruit more employees from traditionally disadvantaged groups, but stopped short of calling for hiring quotas; little change resulted. She criticized oil and gas development on lands claimed by the Lubicon Cree, for which she was criticized by an alderman (who had himself endorsed the oil and gas development) who urged her "to refrain from expressing views on matters that do not fall within [the city's] mandate."

Major issues faced by Reimer during her term as mayor included waste management and the need to open a new landfill. The city administration had proposed a site calculated to minimize NIMBY-ism, but which was expensive and which would run the risk of polluting the North Saskatchewan River. Critics of the site included several communities in Saskatchewan downstream of Edmonton which drew their drinking water from the North Saskatchewan, provincial Environment Minister Ralph Klein, and several environmental experts. After the site was rejected by Edmonton's Board of Health, Reimer attempted to coordinate a regional solution with surrounding communities but was rebuffed. After further proposals located within Edmonton were met with stringent opposition by community groups and by aldermen from the affected wards, the need for a new landfill was postponed by raising the level of the existing one by one meter. The city manager credited the recently implemented curbside recycling program for reducing the need for a new landfill.

She was re-elected in 1992, getting more votes than she had received in 1989 to (defeat businessmen and former Edmonton Eskimos football player Bill Smith). Three years later she went down to a narrow defeat at Smith's hand in 1995, receiving just 1300 votes fewer than Smith. The winner capitalized on a perception that Reimer's administration was hostile to business interests.

== Post-political life ==
After leaving office, Reimer worked as a consultant for the Alberta Council on Aging, and later became the Executive Director of the Alberta Council of Women's Shelters. She largely stayed out of municipal politics, but did criticize a suggestion from alderman Robert Noce that the city borrow from the fund created by the sale of the formerly municipally owned Edmonton Telephones to cover operating shortfalls; Reimer took the position that city council should be less deferential towards engineers on spending decisions, and that it should consider cutting costs by reducing urban sprawl.

In 2004, she was honoured as an Edmontonian of the Century, while in 2006 she was recognized by Governor-General Michaëlle Jean with the Governor General's Award in Commemoration of the Persons Case for her contributions to women's equality.

She is married to Dr. Hubert Kammerer, a physician at the Boyle McCauley Health Centre, and has two children. She gave birth to both of her children while in office and remains the only alderman in Edmonton history to do so with two children.

Reimer received the Queen’s Golden and Diamond Jubilee medals and an Edmonton Public School named for her opened in 2017. In 2024 she was awarded an honorary doctor of laws degree from the University of Alberta for her "political leadership and public service".
