= 1980 Moroccan constitutional referendum =

The 1980 Moroccan constitutional referendum may refer to:

- 23 May 1980 Moroccan constitutional referendum, a constitutional referendum held on May 23
- 30 May 1980 Moroccan constitutional referendum, a constitutional referendum held on May 30
