= 1983 Edmonton municipal election =

Municipal election in Alberta, Canada

The 1983 municipal election was held October 17, 1983 to elect a mayor and twelve aldermen to sit on Edmonton City Council in Alberta, Canada, nine trustees to sit on the public school board, and seven trustees to sit on the separate school board.

== Electoral system ==
Mayor was elected through First past the post.

Councillors were elected through Plurality block voting, two per ward, where each voter could cast up to two votes.

School board positions also were filled through Plurality block voting as well.

== Voter turnout ==
There were 160,942 ballots cast out of 382,053 eligible voters, for a voter turnout of 42.1%.

== Results ==
(bold indicates elected, italics indicate incumbent)

=== Mayor ===
Party	Candidate	Votes	%
**Independent**	**Laurence Decore**	**95,981**	**61.29%**
Independent	Cec Purves	41,273	26.35%
Independent	Jim Wiebe	15,071	9.62%
Independent	Doreen Crowley	2,070	1.32%
Independent	Robert Genis-Bell	1,479	0.94%
Independent	John Valpy	737	0.47%

=== Aldermen ===
Guide:

- E.V.A = Edmonton Voters Association
- R.C.C. = Responsible Citizens Committee
- U.R.G.E. = Urban Reform Group Edmonton

Ward 1			Ward 2			Ward 3			Ward 4		
Party	Candidate	Votes	Party	Candidate	Votes	Party	Candidate	Votes	Party	Candidate	Votes
**R.C.C.**	**G. Lyall Roper**	**16,019**	**U.R.G.E.**	**Jan Reimer**	**12,048**	**Ind.**	**Julian Kinisky**	**7,809**	**Ind.**	**Ed Leger**	**7,235**
**Ind.**	**Olivia Butti**	**12,583**	**Ind.**	**Ron Hayter**	**11,580**	**E.V.A.**	**Ed Ewasiuk**	**7,078**	**Ind.**	**Lance White**	**4,780**
U.R.G.E.	Walter Coombs	7,542	Ind.	Sam Donaghey	8,624	Ind.	June Cavanagh	5,621	Ind.	Allen Wasnea	4,129
Ind.	Johann Ludwig	6,289	E.V.A.	Gene Romaniuk	5,962	Ind.	Margaret Stumbourg	4,658	Ind.	Susan Middlemiss	4,092
Ind.	Naseer Chaudhary	2,060	Ind.	Michael Fedoretz	5,696	R.C.C.	Jim Spalding	4,197	U.R.G.E.	Alex McEachern	3,783
			Ind.	Pierre Lefort	1,124	Ind.	William Chmiliar	3,704	R.C.C.	John Leslie Bodie	2,941
Ward 5			Ward 6			Ind.	Barrie Shewchuk	3,365	R.C.C.	Don Williams	2,865
**Ind.**	**Percy Wickman**	**15,185**	**U.R.G.E.**	**Bettie Hewes**	**15,608**	Ind.	Garry Stevenson	2,037	E.V.A.	Brian Mason	2,455
**R.C.C.**	**Lillian Staroszik**	**12,878**	**Ind.**	**Terry Cavanagh**	**14,352**	Ind.	Klaus Weiher	1,553	Ind.	George Butler	2,083
U.R.G.E.	Lois Campbell	6,797	R.C.C.	James Bateman	8,707	E.V.A.	Lucien Royer	1,416	Ind.	Alex Munzel	1,713
Ind.	Wesley Chandler	6,440	R.C.C.	Ken Kozak	8,110	Ind.	Gerald Lorente	1,237	Ind.	Mark Norris	1,309
E.V.A.	Louise Swift	2,687	Ind.	Max Bahsen	5,075	Ind.	Armand Gendron	341	Ind.	Michael Hodgins	1,036
Ind.	Allan Zemrau	2,509	Ind.	Wayne Weeks	3,375				Ind.	Joe Bugis	954
Ind.	Paul Fuog	895	Ind.	Klaus Lehmann	1,171				Ind.	Carl William	329
Ind.	Dean Leffler	464	Ind.	Owen Timperley	567				Ind.	Murray Scambler	256

=== Public school trustees ===
- **Joan Cowling** - 51434
- **Don Massey** - 50007
- **Mel Binder** - 46872
- **Elaine Jones** - 44147
- **Dick Mather** - 40921
- **George Luck** - 27746
- **Marion Herbert** - 27460
- **Michael Belaire** - 24864
- **John Lakusta** - 23313
- George Hum - 22814
- David Gowan-Smith - 22405
- Edward Hall - 22198
- Jeff Martin - 19260
- Olga Cylurik - 19001
- Douglas Elves - 18240
- Michael McDaid - 16380
- James Bondarenko - 15907

=== Separate (Catholic) school trustees ===
- **Catherine Chichak** - 18290
- **Jean McDonald** - 17690
- **Francis O'Hara** - 15864
- **William Green** - 14690
- **Phil Gibeau** - 14171
- **Hugh Tadman** - 13759
- **Alice Gagne** - 12767
- Elizabeth Reid - 11403
- Diana McIntyre - 10556
- Mark Toth - 9890
- Sarah Clancy - 8528
- James Shinkaruk - 8454
- Simone Secker - 7879
- John Higgins - 7745
