= Catherine Chichak =

Canadian politician (1934–2009)

Member of the Legislative Assembly of Alberta
- In office August 30, 1971 – November 1, 1982
- Preceded by: William Tomyn
- Succeeded by: Ray Martin
- Constituency: Edmonton-Norwood

City of Edmonton Alderman
- In office October 16, 1989 – October 22, 1992 Serving with Ron Hayter
- Preceded by: Jan Reimer
- Succeeded by: Allan Bolstad
- Constituency: Ward 2

Personal details
- Born: October 7, 1934 Krasne, Saskatchewan
- Died: April 6, 2009 (aged 74)
- Party: Progressive Conservative
- Spouse: Stanley Chichak
- Occupation: Real Estate Agent

Catherine Chichak (October 7, 1934 – April 6, 2009) was a politician from Alberta, Canada. She served as a member of the Legislative Assembly of Alberta and as an Alderman in the City of Edmonton.

== Early life ==
Catherine Chichak was born in the small village of Krasne, Saskatchewan and grew up in the nearby town of Wynard. After high school she moved to Edmonton, Alberta and attended McTavish Business College and the University of Alberta where she earned her real estate license. She married Stanley Chichak on May 14, 1960.

== Political career ==
Chichak first ran for political office in the 1966 Edmonton municipal election. She finished in 20th place out of 44 in the plurality block vote, not high enough for a seat on city council. She ran again in the 1968 Edmonton municipal election; she did slightly better, finishing 17th out of a field of 32 candidates, but still short of election to council.

Chichak ran for the Alberta Legislature as the Progressive Conservative candidate in the electoral district of Edmonton-Norwood in the 1971 general election. She won comfortably over two other candidates.

Chichak ran for her second term in the 1975 Alberta general election. She defeated former cabinet minister Alfred Hooke and two other candidates. In the 1979 Alberta general election, she defeated future NDP MLA Ray Martin and three other candidates. She retired from provincial politics at dissolution of the assembly in 1982.

Chichak entered Edmonton municipal politics as a candidate for the Separate School board in the 1983 municipal election. She finished at the top of the polls. She was re-elected in the 1986 municipal election, again at the top of the polls.

In 1989, Chichak ran for a seat to city council in the municipal election that year and won the second seat in Ward 2. She became mired in a scandal after it came to light that she owed $8,400 in business taxes. She was convicted and fined for signing a false statement regarding her tax debt. The court also found she was ineligible to have run for office, but let her keep her seat because she paid her taxes. She was defeated in the 1992 election, finishing sixth among ten candidates.
