= 1966 Edmonton municipal election =

Municipal election in Alberta, Canada

The 1966 municipal election was held October 19, 1966, in Edmonton, Alberta, Canada, to elect a mayor and twelve aldermen to sit on Edmonton City Council and seven trustees to sit on each of the public and separate school boards. The electorate also decided three plebiscite questions.

The electoral system used was First past the post for the mayoral election and Plurality block voting for the election of councillors and trustees. Voters could cast as many as votes as the members to be elected.

== Voter turnout ==
In this election, 125,084 voters voted, out of 208,716 eligible voters, for a voter turnout of 59.9%.

== Results ==
(bold indicates elected, italics indicate incumbent)

=== Mayor ===
Party	Candidate	Votes	%
Independent	Vincent Dantzer	64,233	51.85%
Independent	William Hawrelak	54,544	44.03%
Independent	Alex Latta	5,105	4.12%

=== Aldermen ===
Party	Candidate	Votes	Elected
Better Civic Government Committee	Morris Weinlos	60,731	✓
Independent	Ivor Dent	54,380	✓
Civil Rights Association	Julia Kiniski	53,969	✓
Better Civic Government Committee	John Leslie Bodie	52,805	✓
Better Civic Government Committee	James Bateman	47,229	✓
Better Civic Government Committee	Frank Edwards	42,979	✓
Independent	Ed Leger	40,750	✓
Better Civic Government Committee	Una Evans	39,469	✓
Better Civic Government Committee	Cec Purves	37,607	✓
Independent	Angus McGugan	36,115	✓
Independent	Neil Crawford	35,846	✓
Better Civic Government Committee	Reginald Easton	35,353	✓
Better Civic Government Committee	Kathleen McCallum	35,294	
Independent	Norbert Berkowitz	34,628	
Independent	James Falconer	34,151	
Better Civic Government Committee	Don Gray	31,279	
Better Civic Government Committee	Conrad Kosowan	28,939	
Independent	Allan Welsh	28,864	
Better Civic Government Committee	Bob Evans	27,962	
Independent	Catherine Chichak	25,458	
Independent	Ron Hayter	24,981	
Independent	Laurette Douglas	24,060	
Independent	G. A. (Pat) O'Hara	23,968	
Independent	A. Terry Laing	23,348	
Independent	Patrick Ryan	23,108	
Independent	Ken McAuley	20,384	
Independent	Paul Bassett	20,129	
Better Civic Government Committee	Jack Holmes	17,970	
Independent	L. M. Campbell	17,606	
Independent	Joyce Kurie	16,612	
Independent	Albert Bourcier	16,001	
Independent	Lila Fahlman	13,867	
Independent	Patrick Murphy	13,048	
Independent	John Lakusta	12,258	
Independent	Assad Farrah	12,209	
Independent	Douglas Tomlinson	12,174	
Independent	Harold Oppelt	12,127	
Civil Rights Association	Ernest Betteridge	11,245	
Independent	Walter (Wally) Brox	11,201	
Independent	Michael English	10,860	
Independent	Joe Tannous	9,966	
Independent	Walter Makowecki	9,375	
Independent	John Peets	6,677	
Civil Rights Association	Ivar Vanags	5,720	

=== Public school trustees ===
Party	Candidate	Votes	Elected
Better Education Association	Earl Buxton	52,500	✓
Better Education Association	Jackson Willis	51,938	✓
Better Education Association	Milton Lazerte	50,066	✓
Quality Education Council	Edith Rogers	45,595	✓
Better Education Association	John Bracco	44,228	✓
Better Education Association	Warren Edward (Ted) Smith	42,747	✓
Independent	Vernon Johnson	34,874	✓
Better Education Association	Lois Campbell	31,903	
Better Education Association	Mary Johnson	28,587	
Independent	Dorothy Preston	18,943	
Quality Education Council	Joseph Boehm	16,844	
Quality Education Council	Joan Ennion	16,476	
Quality Education Council	John Poppitt	16,162	
Quality Education Council	Anna Pollock	15,544	
Independent	William Chomyn	14,244	
Quality Education Council	John Fuga	11,260	
Independent	Laura Tuomi	8,867	

=== Separate (Catholic) school trustees ===
Party	Candidate	Votes	Elected
Independent	George Brosseau	17,518	✓
Independent	G. Rene Boileau	16,891	✓
Independent	Jean McDonald	16,136	✓
Independent	Bernard Feehan	15,217	✓
Independent	Bill Diachuk	15,057	✓
Independent	Orest Demco	14,580	✓
Independent	Edward Stack	14,561	✓
Independent	Bob Neville	14,356	
Independent	Elmar Abele	12,615	
Independent	Harry Carrigan	12,434	

=== Plebiscites ===
==== Bridge ====
Should Council pass bylaw No. 2789 to borrow by debentures $5,750,000.00 as the City share of a cross-river bridge and approaches at 72nd Street to arterial standards from 98th Avenue to 101st Avenue, to freeway standards from 101st Avenue to 112th Avenue and to arterial standards from 112th Avenue to 118th Avenue?

- **Yes** - 53750
- No - 24062

==== Fluoridation of Water ====
Should Council pass bylaw No. 2889 allowing fluoride for the prevention of tooth decay to be added to the City water supply sufficient to bring the fluoride content of City water up to the level of one part fluoride to one million parts of water?

- **Yes** - 71618
- No - 46255

==== Allowing Events on Sundays ====
Should Council pass bylaw No. 2886 as authorized by The Alberta Lord's Day Act allowing certain public games, contests or sports at which a fee is charged on Sunday afternoons between the hours of half past one and six o’clock?

- **Yes** - 93310
- No - 25258
