= Cec Purves =

Canadian politician (born 1933)

30th Mayor of Edmonton
- In office October 19, 1977 – October 17, 1983
- Preceded by: Terry Cavanagh
- Succeeded by: Laurence Decore

Alderman on the Edmonton City Council (Ward 2)
- In office October 13, 1971 – October 16, 1974 Serving with Alex Fallow, David Ward
- Preceded by: New district
- Succeeded by: Laurence Decore, Olivia Butti, David Leadbeater

Alderman on the Edmonton City Council (at large)
- In office October 19, 1966 – October 13, 1971

Personal details
- Born: October 18, 1933 (age 91); Edmonton, Alberta
- Political party: Better Civic Government Committee, Independent
- Spouse: Clare Heller
- Children: Four daughters
- Profession: Businessman

Cecil John Harry "Cec" Purves (born October 18, 1933) is a politician in Alberta, Canada, who served as mayor of Edmonton.

== Early life ==
Purves was born in Edmonton on October 18, 1933. He grew up in the city's Calder, Pigeon Lake, Norwood, Riverdale, and Lavigne (now known as Skunk Hollow) areas and went to Victoria High School and Strathcona High School. Purves graduated in 1950. On December 29, 1956 he married Clare Heller, with whom he have four daughters, Cindy, Corinne, Caroline and Catherine.

He worked for the Dominion Bank from 1950 until 1959, and worked for his family's upholstering firm, Apex Auto Upholstering, from 1959 until 1988.

Purves is a member of the Church of Jesus Christ of Latter-day Saints. Purves was a convert to the Church. Purves has served as a bishop in the Church and was the first Edmonton-born man to serve as a bishop in the Church in Edmonton.

== Political career ==
Purves' first bid for political office took place during the 1964 municipal election, when he ran unsuccessfully for Protestant school trustee. He finished eleventh of twenty-one candidates; the top seven were elected.

He ran for Edmonton City Council instead in the 1966 election, and was elected as one of twelve aldermen, finishing ninth of thirty-two candidates. He was re-elected in the 1968 election, finishing fifth out of thirty-two candidates. While still in office, he sought the Social Credit nomination in Edmonton-Strathcona for the 1971 provincial election, but was defeated by Strathcona Centre incumbent Joseph Donovan Ross (who was defeated in the general election by Progressive Conservative Julian Koziak). In the 1971 election, Edmonton was for the first time divided into aldermanic wards; three aldermen would be elected from each of the four wards. Purves ran in Ward 2, and finished first out of eleven candidates.

In the 1974 election, Purves ran for mayor, challenging incumbent Ivor Dent. He defeated Dent, but so did William Hawrelak, who received more than twice as many votes as Purves. Hawrelak died in office and was replaced by alderman Terry Cavanagh, who Purves challenged for mayor in the 1977 election. In winning, he beat not only Cavanagh (who finished third) but Dent (who finished fourth) and future mayor Laurence Decore (who finished second). Purves faced no serious opposition to his 1980 re-election bid, and won more than seventy percent of the vote.

Some of the highlights of Purves' terms as mayor were the 1978 Commonwealth Games and the accompanying opening of Commonwealth Stadium. Queen Elizabeth II and Prince Philip with two of their sons, Andrew and Edward opened the Games. It was a huge success internationally.

In 1979, Edmontonians voted to proceed with the construction of a convention center rejecting a ballot measure that would have halted the proposal. Purves was a public supporter of building the center and saw to its completion in 1983 despite much opposition.

Ed Zemrau approached Purves to get his support for a bid for the University Games. He met with President Meyer Horowitz and they agreed that it would be a good thing for Edmonton and the University of Alberta (located in Edmonton) as the facilities were in place. They proceeded to make a bid for the 1983 Games and were successful. The Games were another feather in the cap for Edmontonian's who made it a tremendous success. Prince Charles & Princess Diana attended as sponsors and opened the games which was exciting for Edmontonians.

Purves also opened the first leg of LRT and during office started the extension of this transportation system to the Government center and finished it. Purves introduced a debt reduction program in 1981 for the city which the council adopted. The city won accolades in the following years for its fiscal plans. Purves continued to push for major roadways throughout the city. He was concerned about the city's long term future and presented the government with an annexation proposal. The government announced the proposal would have to go through the Local Authorities Board which the city did. The mayor always stated it was a political decision and the government should make it. In the end after many thousands of dollars being spent and untold hours in meetings and doing research it was finished and the LAB Board presented it to cabinet without publicly giving their decision and it was taken to cabinet where they made a political decision. This was largest annexation in the history of city but it was poorly done by the government. This created and would problems in the future.

Also under Purves' leadership the city built a modern downtown Police Station. He appointed the first Auditor General for City of Edmonton.

Another appointment by Purves was of Fred Windwick to lead the celebration of Edmonton's 75th anniversary which was a great success.

Purves also worked with the Provincial Government to come up with a gift to the Province which would be a part of the Government for years to come. A speakers canopy was approved by the Government and Speaker of the House and was built by City employees. It is a magnificent piece of art, which Purves presented formally to the Government at a ceremony at the legislature.

Purves worked with the Kinsmen to build Kinsman Field House with opposition from Parks and Rec as they felt since it was on city property they should run it. Purves continued to fight for the preservation of the river valley. Under his leadership the city acquired close to 70% of the properties in Rossdale. Purves worked with the Alberta Government on the development of Capital City Recreation Park . He also continued to push the Provincial Government to assist in financing the construction of ring roads. He also fought and won the fight with the Federal Government on closing the municipal airport. The airport was a very important part of the city's development and was a great communication center for the.

Purves was defeated in the 1983 election by Decore, who received more than twice as many votes as the incumbent. He did not seek to re-enter politics thereafter.

== Retirement and extra-political involvement ==
Purves served as a member of the St. Joseph's Hospital board, the Edmonton Police Commission, the Greater Edmonton Foundation board, the Edmonton Public Library board, the Edmonton Chamber of Commerce, and the Edmonton Symphony Society board. He was at various times a member of the Edmonton Exhibition Association, and president of the Edmonton Jaycees in 1962. He also received the Jaycees Senate Award. He was also chosen twice as one of the 10 outstanding young men in Alberta by the Alberta Jaycees. (a young men's international organization).

Purves was called as a bishop of a ward of The Church of Jesus, Christ of Latter-day Saints in 1974 and served until 1977. He served in many other positions within the church over the years.

Purves served on the Edmonton chapter of The Canadian Mental health Association and became president.

He filed for bankruptcy on March 29, 1988.

Preceded by Terry Cavanagh	Mayor of Edmonton; 1977–1983	Succeeded by Laurence Decore
