= 1970 Edmonton municipal by-election =

Election in Alberta, Canada

Julia Kiniski, an alderman on the Edmonton City Council elected in 1968, died on October 11, 1969. A by-election was held November 27, 1970 to replace her. The electorate also decided three plebiscite questions.

The by-election's winner, Julian Kinisky (Kiniski's son), was the last alderman to be elected at-large in Edmonton. The 1971 election introduced wards to Edmonton's municipal elections.

In addition to choosing a new City Councillor, citizens were asked to vote on three related plebiscites. Following the yes vote on the 1968 Convention and Sports Complex plebiscite, citizens this time were asked to vote in favor or against specific funding requests for the Omniplex project. With costs of $34,000,000 and an annual operating deficit up to $3,000,000, compared to $23,000,000 and $2,000,000 quoted in the 1968 plebiscite, voters turned down the three related Omniplex requests for funding. The single-site sports and convention concept was eventually served by the distributed Northlands Coliseum (opened 1974), Commonwealth Stadium (1978), and Edmonton Convention Centre (1983).

== Voter turnout ==
There were 77,571 ballots cast out of 238,828 eligible voters, for a voter turnout of 32.5%.

== Results ==
(bold indicates elected, italics indicate incumbent)

=== Alderman ===
- **Julian Kinisky** – 42331
- Sam Agronin – 7841
- Bill McLean – 7479
- William Boytzun – 6574
- Larry Messier – 6019
- Terry Laing – 5446
- Percy Wickman – 1712
- Wilson Arthur Stewart – 654
- Ruby Sharon Lyons – 441

=== Plebiscites ===
==== Omniplex Construction ====
Should Council pass bylaw No. 3624 to borrow by debentures the sum of $26,434,000.00 for the construction of an Omniplex containing a Trade and Convention Centre and Covered Sports Facilities, the sum to include the building, its equipment and furnishings, and the acquisition of the land which the building will be located?

Attendant costs of the Omniplex project are: 1. Construction of parking facilities near the Omniplex up to $3,400,000.00 2. Annual operating deficit, unknown in amount but approximately $2,000,000.00 to $3,000,000.00 and expected to diminish yearly. 3. $4,366,000.00 that represents a computation of interest costs that could be allocated to Omniplex from future road programs that would be accelerated by construction of Omniplex.

- Yes – 32463
- **No** – 38060

==== Omniplex Parking ====
To purchase land North of proposed Omniplex site to be used for parking.

- Yes – 29653
- **No** – 39532

==== Omniplex Pedestrian Passage ====
Providing a pedestrian passage from Omniplex Building to a Rapid Transit Station Site.

- Yes – 26081
- **No** – 40592
