= 1974 Edmonton municipal election =

Municipal election in Alberta, Canada

The 1974 municipal election was held October 16, 1974 to elect a mayor and twelve aldermen to sit on Edmonton City Council and seven trustees to sit on each of the public and separate school boards.

The aldermen were elected using plurality block voting in three-seat wards.

== Voter turnout ==
There were 141,636 ballots cast out of 406,995 eligible voters, for a voter turnout of 36.4%.

== Results ==
(bold indicates elected, italics indicate incumbent)

=== Mayor ===
Party	Candidate	Votes	%
**Independent**	**William Hawrelak**	**67,741**	**49.21%**
Independent	Cec Purves	32,674	23.74%
Independent	Ivor Dent	28,297	20.56%
Independent	David Ward	6,983	5.07%
Edmonton League for Socialist Action	Carl Austin	1,017	0.74%
Independent	Nell Martin	507	0.37%
Independent	John Horobec	435	0.32%

=== Aldermen ===
Guide:

- E.V.A = Edmonton Voters Association
- U.R.G.E. = Urban Reform Group Edmonton

Ward 1			Ward 2			Ward 3			Ward 4		
Party	Candidate	Votes	Party	Candidate	Votes	Party	Candidate	Votes	Party	Candidate	Votes
**Ind.**	**Ches Tanner**	**17,222**	**Ind.**	**Laurence Decore**	**13,213**	**Ind.**	**Ed Leger**	**12,733**	**Ind.**	**Terry Cavanagh**	**19,868**
**Ind.**	**Kenneth Newman**	**14,902**	**Ind.**	**Olivia Butti**	**8,564**	**Ind.**	**Ron Hayter**	**10,016**	**Ind.**	**Buck Olsen**	**15,973**
**Ind.**	**Robert Matheson**	**14,644**	**E.V.A.**	**David Leadbeater**	**7,152**	**U.R.G.E.**	**Edward Kennedy**	**8,670**	**U.R.G.E.**	**Bettie Hewes**	**15,447**
Ind.	Terry Laing	12,827	Ind.	James Falconer	6,658	Ind.	Terry Nugent	7,886	Ind.	Sheila McKay	9,125
Ind.	Bud Salloum	7,758	Ind.	Cecil Rhodes	6,006	U.R.G.E.	Sam Agronin	7,248	Ind.	Mitchell Wujcik	6,949
Ind.	John Ludwig	7,667	Ind.	Neil MacLean	5,667	Ind.	Bill McLean	7,149	Ind.	John Lakusta	6,364
U.R.G.E.	Syeda Hameed	6,194	U.R.G.E.	Percy Wickman	5,313	Ind.	Olee Wowk	3,803	Ind.	Elaine Johnson	5,585
Ind.	George Luck	5,154	U.R.G.E.	Gerry Wright	5,052	Ind.	Gerhard Volkmann	3,703	Ind.	William Askin	4,947
Ind.	Eddie Keehn	4,602	Ind.	Bruce Vaughan	4,129	Ind.	Gene Dub	3,935	E.V.A.	Walter Doskoch	4,820
Ind.	Jean Pierre Van Eck	3,221	Ind.	Clif Tait	3,276	Ind.	Henry Rutkowski	3,588			
Ind.	Ernie Hayne	2,332	Ind.	David Collier	3,142	Ind.	Lou Acocella	1,044			
			Ind.	Victor Sedo	2,422						
			Ind.	Larry Messier	1,929						
			Ind.	Paul Fuog	1,348						
			Ind.	Peter Yuca	1,125						
			Socialist Action	Angela Mueller	1,104						

=== Public school trustees ===
- **Herb Jamieson** - 34991
- **Shirley Forbes** - 31808
- **Vernon Johnson** - 28606
- **James Falconer** - 28259
- **Catherine Ford** - 25461
- **Ernest Lund** - 24732
- **Mel Binder** - 23521
- Don Massey - 23471
- Jim Patrick - 21968
- Betty Flewitt - 21349
- Maria Flak - 17914
- Jean Haddow - 17217
- Gerry Beck - 15700
- R W Sherwin - 15416
- Anna Pollock - 15376
- Al Fahlman - 14366
- Bernice Youck - 13030
- Ken Kozak - 12299
- Ashgar Ali - 10110
- William Lee - 9050
- Mark Pastic - 6392
- Tim Nolt - 6191
- William Hegedus - 6135
- George Skov - 5524

=== Separate (Catholic) school trustees ===
Each voter could cast up to seven votes (plurality block voting).

- **Jean Forest** - 14559
- **Leo Floyd** - 14406
- **Jean McDonald** - 11132
- **W McNeill** - 9493
- **Phil Gibeau** - 9425
- **Raymond Pinkowski** - 8499
- **Laurier Picard** - 8348
- Robert Carney - 7957
- Orest Evenshen - 7898
- Nicholas Sheptycki - 6716
- Robert Gourdine - 6593
- Edward Christie - 6463
- Bob McDonald - 5711
- Adele - 4946
- Larry Messier - 4938
- Paul Haljan - 3976
- Stanley Blazosek - 3532
- Don Davies - 3246
- Vincent Hawskwell - 3102
