= Don Massey =

Canadian politician

Member of the Legislative Assembly of Alberta for Edmonton-Mill Woods
- In office June 15, 1993 – November 22, 2004
- Preceded by: Gerry Gibeault
- Succeeded by: Weslyn Mather

Personal details
- Born: August 15, 1936 (age 90) Edmonton, Alberta
- Party: Alberta Liberal Party
- Spouse(s): Barbara Jane Redman (m. 6 Mar 1965-April 23, 2016, her death)
- Children: one
- Education: University of Alberta; University of Kansas

Donald Lee Massey is a former municipal and provincial level politician from Alberta, Canada. He served as a Member of the Legislative Assembly of Alberta from 1993 until 2004. In that period he also served as Leader of the Official Opposition and Leader of the Alberta Liberal Party in 2004. From 1977 until 1989 he was a Public School Trustee in Edmonton.

== Municipal politics ==
Massey first ran for public office in the 1974 Edmonton municipal election. He ran for the office of Public School Trustee finishing an eighth place with 23,471 votes. He was just 100 votes short from earning the seventh place seat that went to Mel Binder. He ran again for School Trustee in the 1977 Edmonton municipal election, this time there were two seats added. Massey won the fifth place seat with 33,444 votes.

Massey would run as an incumbent in the 1980 Edmonton municipal election. He would see a significant drop in his popular vote, but would finish fourth place out of the top nine with 19,060 votes. Massey would significantly increase his popular vote winning 50,007 votes and second place out of nine in the 1983 Edmonton municipal election. He won his fifth and final term in the 1986 Edmonton municipal election. Once again he took second place and won with 29,323. He did not run again in 1989.

== Provincial politics ==
After serving for eleven years as a Public School Trustee, Massey decided to run for provincial office in the 1993 Alberta general election. He won the electoral district of Edmonton Mill Woods picking it up for the Liberals. He defeated five other candidates with a comfortable plurality to win his first term in office. He was re-elected to his second term in the 1997 Alberta general election. He was reelected with a reduced but comfortable margin of victory and popular vote share defeating four other candidates.

Massey stood for a third term in the 2001 Alberta general election defeating Progressive Conservative candidate Carl Benito in a hotly contested election. He would become the interim Liberal leader and Official Opposition Leader after Ken Nicol resigned to run for a seat in the House of Commons of Canada in 2004.

Legislative Assembly of Alberta
Preceded by Gerry Gibeault	MLA Edmonton Mill Woods; 1993–2004	Succeeded by Weslyn Mather
Preceded by Ken Nicol	Leader of the Official Opposition in Alberta; 2004	Succeeded by Kevin Taft
Party political offices
Preceded by Ken Nicol	Interim Leader of the Alberta Liberal Party; 2004	Succeeded by Kevin Taft
