= Doug Pruden =

Canadian sportsman

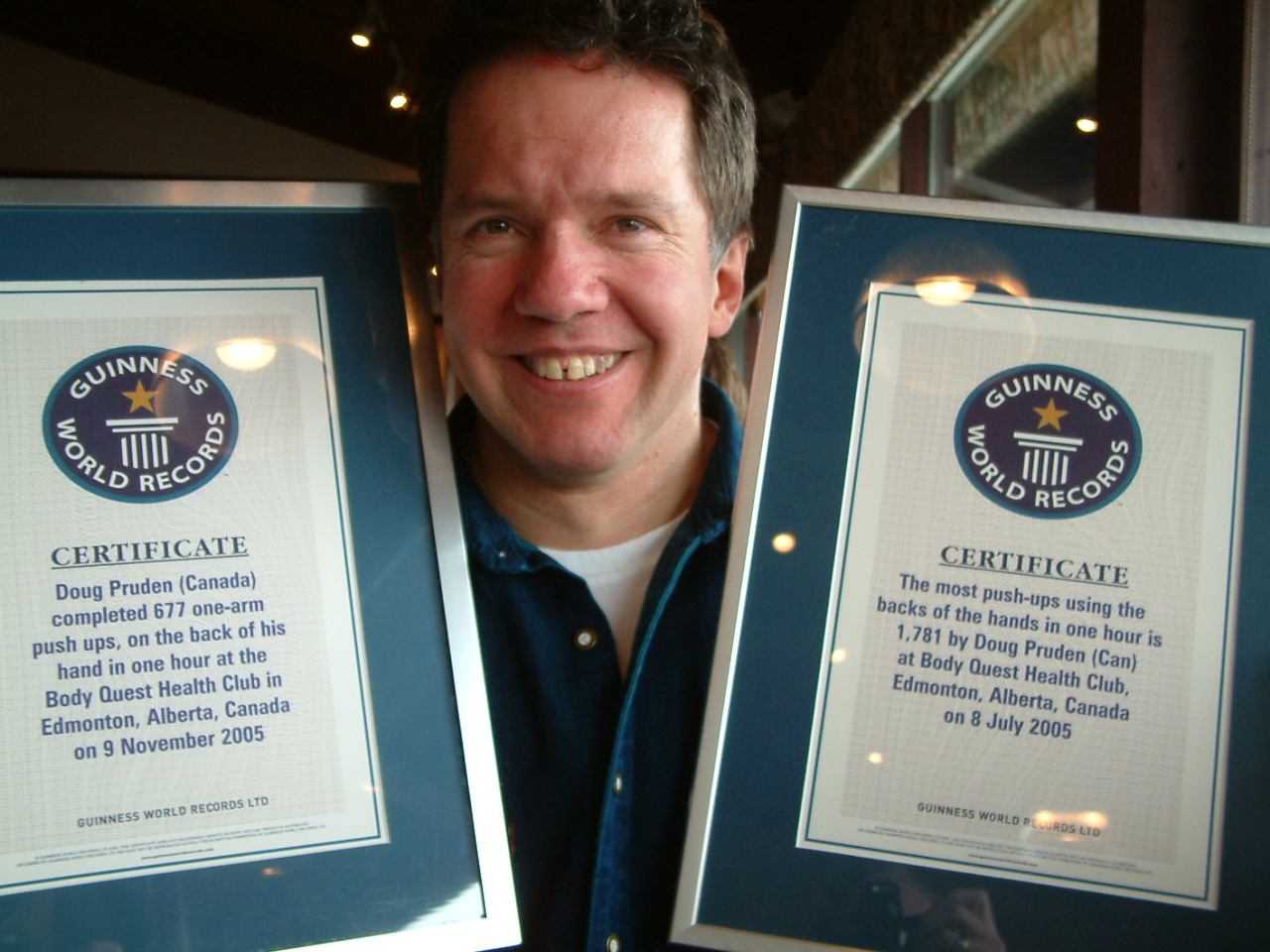
Pruden displaying two world records: 677 one-armed backhanded push-ups in one hour and 1,781 backhanded push-ups in one hour (2005)

Doug Pruden is a Canadian endurance sportsman and street performer who has held several world records for push-ups.

== Biography ==
Doug Pruden was born in Edmonton in 1962 or 1963. He studied urban planning and architectural design at the Northern Alberta Institute of Technology.

Pruden began doing push-ups in junior high school, later explaining that he preferred solitary exercises to team sports. In the early 1990s, he began combining his fitness regimen with faith-based outreach, speaking to teenagers at South Edmonton-area shopping centres about scripture and abstinence, while incorporating push-up demonstrations as a motivational tool.

Pruden became known locally as the "Push-Up Man" through busking appearances at events such as the Edmonton International Fringe Festival, where he performed endurance routines such as 1,000 push-ups in under 20 minutes. He gained attention for his involvement in civic and community events, from volunteering at flood relief and youth forums to attending funerals of local figures and some media have described him as a publicity seeker. In recent years, Pruden has remained active as a street performer in Edmonton, staging push-up demonstrations on Whyte Avenue.

=== Push-up records ===
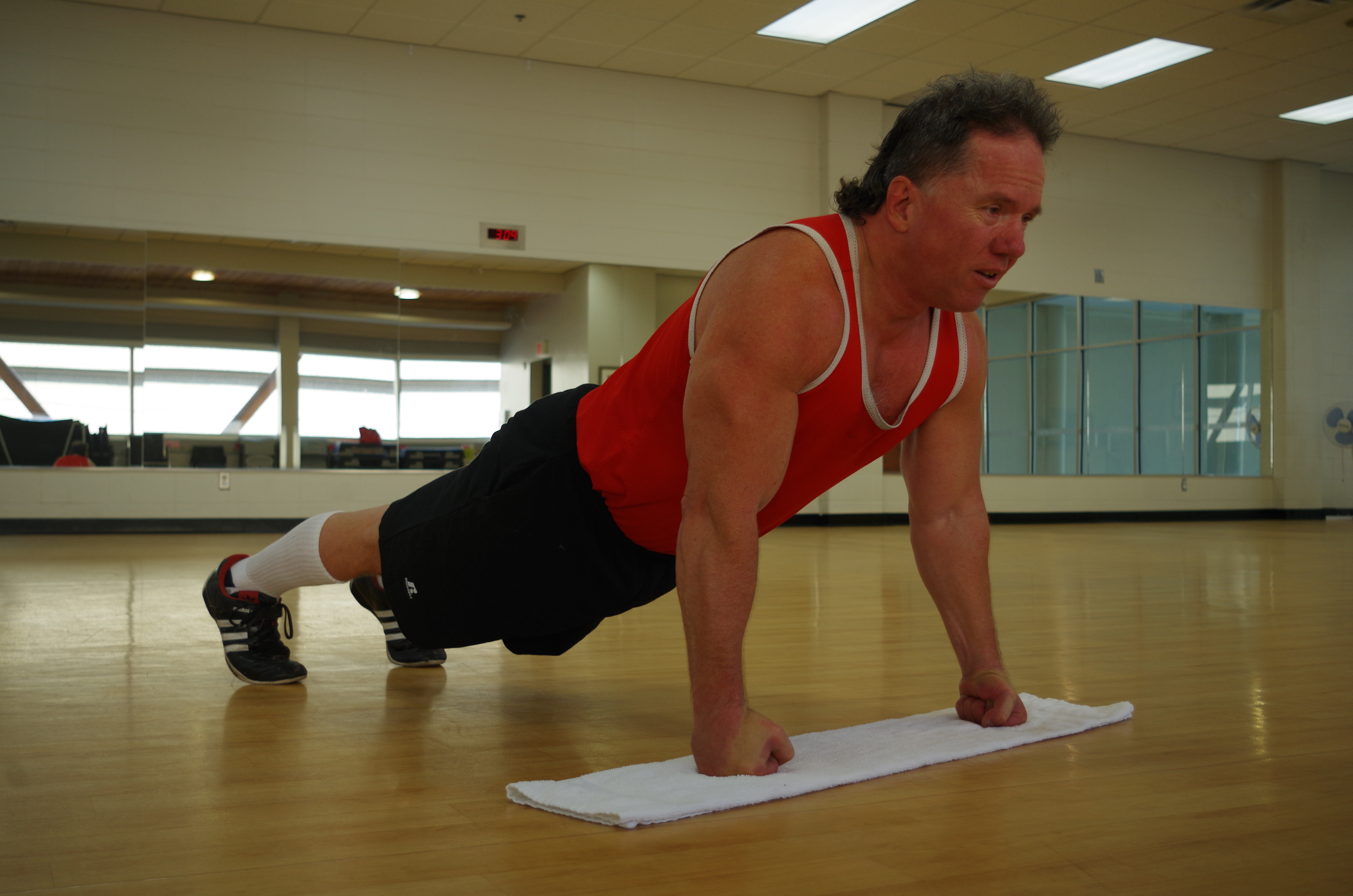
Pruden doing fist push-ups in Edmonton (2015)

Pruden set his first world record on August 19, 2001, completing 102 one-armed push-ups in one minute. As of 2015, Pruden has held 10 world records in various push-up categories and currently holds seven:

- 114 one-arm push-ups in one minute in March 2003
- 1,000 fist push-ups in 18:13 minutes on July 9, 2003
- 546 one-arm push-ups in 10 minutes on July 30, 2003
- 1,382 one-arm push-ups in 30 minutes on July 30, 2003
- 5,557 fist push-ups in 3:02:30 hours on July 9, 2004
- 1,777 one-arm push-ups in one hour in November 2004
- 1,781 backhanded push-ups in one hour on July 8, 2005
- 677 one-arm backhanded push-ups on November 9, 2005
- 59 one-arm backhanded push-ups in one minute on March 24, 2007
- 1,025 one-arm backhanded push-ups on November 8, 2008

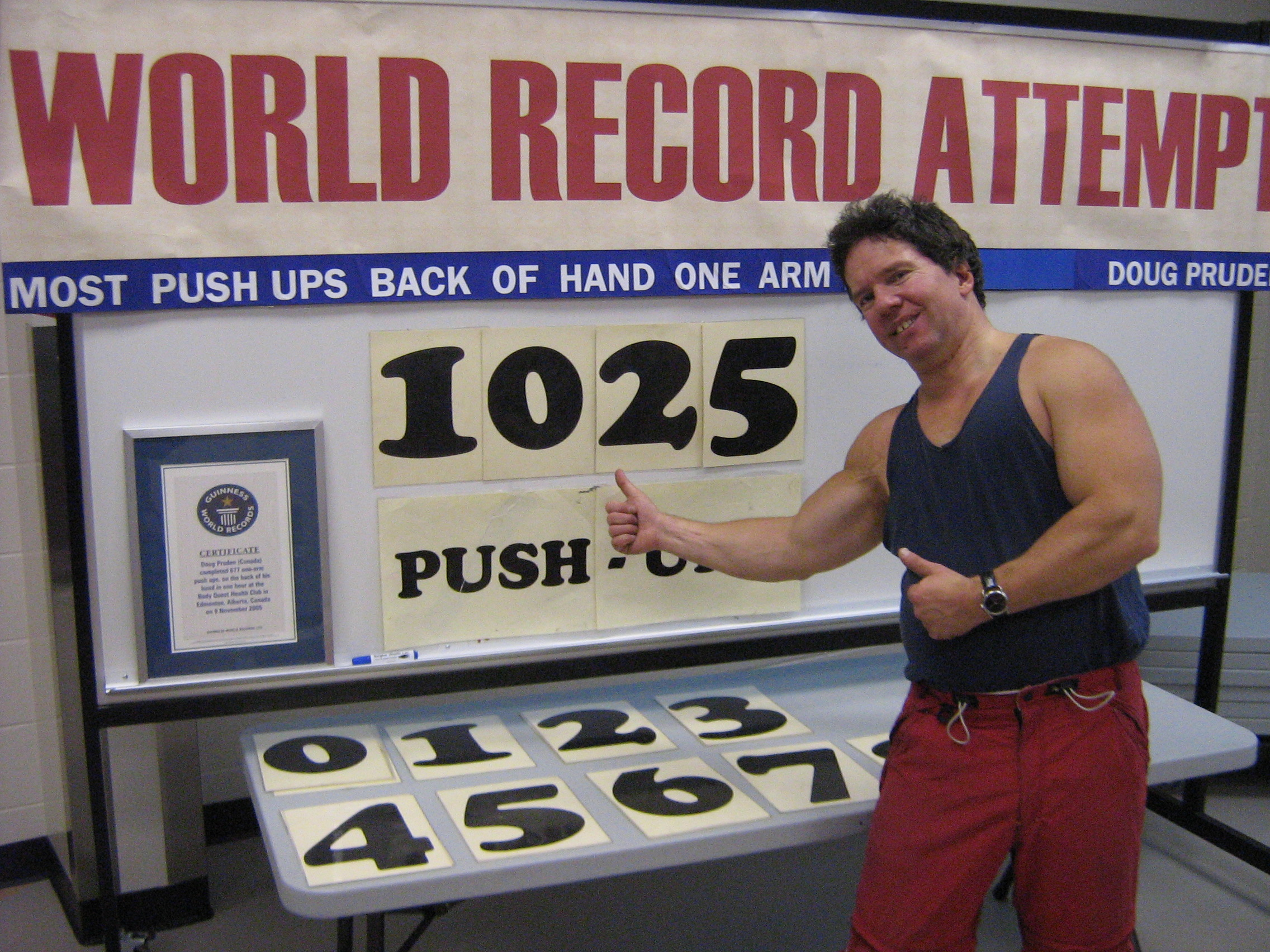
Doug Pruden did 1,025 one-arm backhanded push-ups in one hour at Don Wheaton Family YMCA

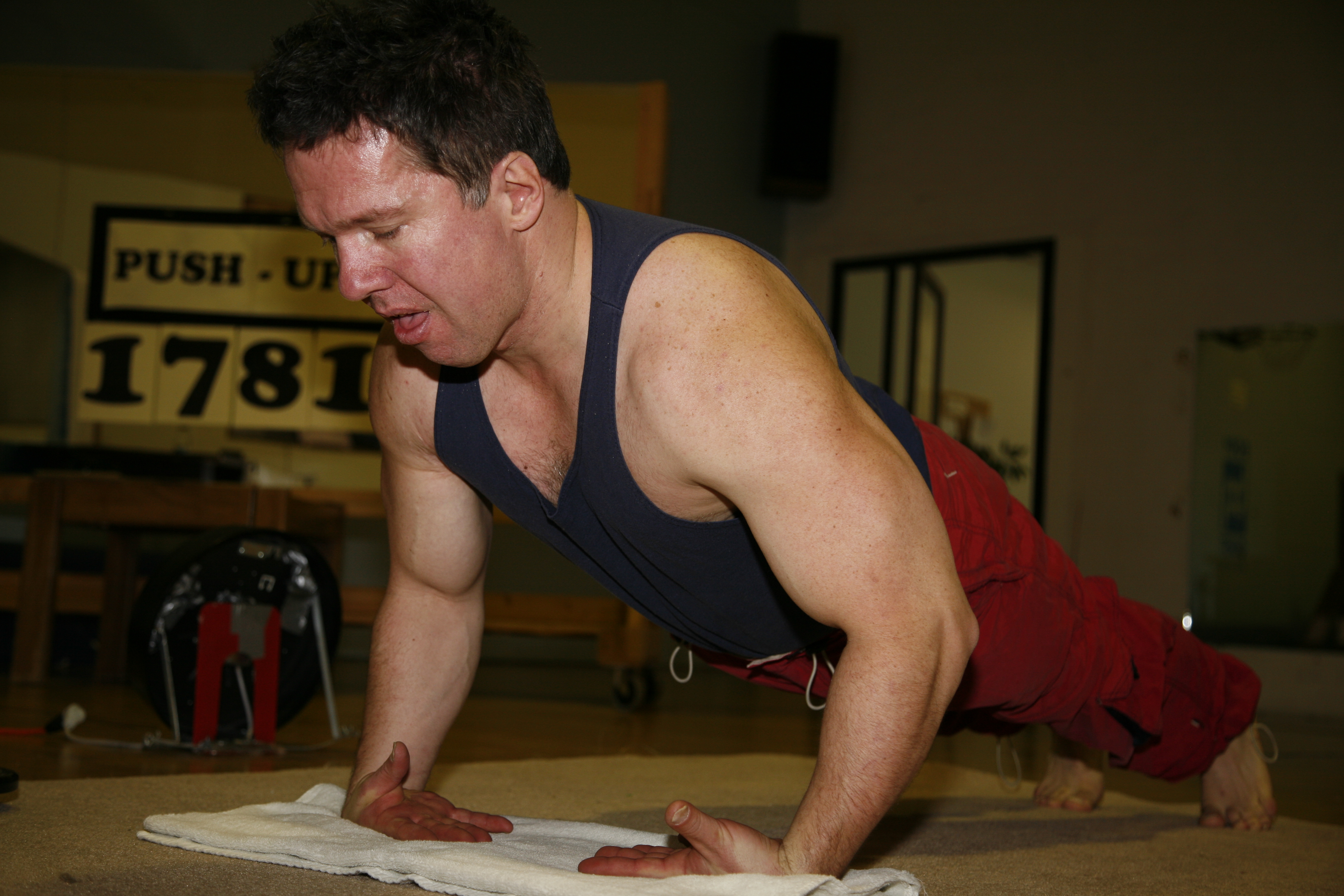
Doug Pruden doing backhanded push-ups in an Edmonton gym

== Politics ==
In 1992, Pruden ran for Edmonton City Council in Ward 5. He placed last among eight candidates with 1,949 votes.
