= Richard Jamieson =

Canadian politician

Richard Herbert Jamieson

Member of the Legislative Assembly of Alberta
- In office June 18, 1959 – June 17, 1963
- Preceded by: New district
- Succeeded by: District Abolished
- Constituency: Jasper West

Edmonton Public School Trustee
- In office October 13, 1971 – October 17, 1983

Personal details
- Born: April 19, 1912 Saskatoon, Saskatchewan
- Died: September 15, 2003 (aged 91) Edmonton, Alberta
- Party: Social Credit
- Occupation: politician

Richard Herbert Jamieson (1912-2003) was a politician from Alberta, Canada. He served as a member of the Legislative Assembly of Alberta from 1959 to 1963 sitting with the Social Credit caucus in government. He later served as a Public School Trustee for the Edmonton School Board from 1971 to 1983.

== Political career ==
=== Provincial ===
Jamieson ran for a seat to the Alberta Legislature as a Social Credit candidate in the Jasper West electoral district for the 1959 Alberta general election. Due to the Edmonton electoral district being broken up due to redistribution the race was hotly contested with two incumbents. Jamieson defeated John Page and Abe Miller taking just over 40% of the popular vote to win a seat and pickup the new district for his party.

He retired from provincial politics at dissolution of the Assembly in 1963.

=== Municipal ===
Jamieson ran for a seat to the Edmonton Public School Board in the 1968 Edmonton municipal election. He finished in eighth place over all, just missing out on the seventh place seat.

Jamieson attempted a second run for public school trustee in the 1971 Edmonton municipal election. This time he managed to win his first term in office, winning the seventh and final seat.

Jamieson ran for his second term as a Trustee in the 1974 Edmonton municipal election. He won the first place seat heading the polls to return to office.

The 1977 Edmonton municipal election saw Jamieson run for his third term in office. He won the seventh out of nine seats to keep his seat on council after losing some of his popular vote from the previous election.

Jamieson ran for his fourth and final term in the 1980 Edmonton municipal election. He won the sixth place out of nine seats to return to council. He retired at dissolution of council in 1983.
