= 1980 Edmonton municipal election =

Municipal election in Alberta, Canada

The 1980 municipal election was held October 15, 1980 to elect a mayor and twelve aldermen to sit on Edmonton City Council, nine trustees to sit on the public school board, and seven trustees to sit on the separate school board.

This was the first election in which there were two aldermen elected from each of the six wards, instead of three aldermen elected from each of the four wards, as had previously been the case.

== Electoral system ==
Mayor was elected through first past the post.

Councillors and school trustees were elected through block voting.

== Voter turnout ==
There were 72,939 ballots cast out of 341,102 eligible voters, for a voter turnout of 21.4%.

== Results ==
(bold indicates elected, italics indicate incumbent)

=== Mayor ===
Party	Candidate	Votes	%
**Independent**	**Cec Purves**	**52,035**	**76.47%**
Independent	Murray Trott	5,346	7.86%
Independent	Lester Adams	4,902	7.20%
Independent	Eddie Keehn	2,938	4.32%
Independent	John Horobec	1,575	2.31%
Independent	John Buttrey	1,249	1.84%

=== Aldermen ===
Guide:

- E.V.A = Edmonton Voters Association
- U.R.G.E. = Urban Reform Group Edmonton

Ward 1			Ward 2			Ward 3		
Party	Candidate	Votes	Party	Candidate	Votes	Party	Candidate	Votes
**Independent**	**Kenneth Newman**	**7,683**	**Independent**	**Ron Hayter**	**5,175**	**Independent**	**June Cavanagh**	**4,629**
**Independent**	**Olivia Butti**	**6,673**	**U.R.G.E.**	**Jan Reimer**	**4,433**	**E.V.A.**	**Ed Ewasiuk**	**3,184**
U.R.G.E.	Iain Taylor	4,155	Independent	Jim Spalding	3,255	U.R.G.E.	Judy Bethel	2,727
U.R.G.E.	Sherburne McCurdy	3,851	U.R.G.E.	Lila Fahlman	2,480	Independent	Sheila McKay	2,692
			Independent	David Stewart	1,685	Independent	William Chmiliar	2,604
			Independent	John Hawrelak	1,019	Independent	Mitch Wujik	2,384
			E.V.A.	Harry Johnson	419	U.R.G.E.	Clint Budd	708
			Independent	Wayne Hayes	313	Independent	Robert Acker	333
						Independent	Tim Baloben	279
						Independent	Noel Round	203
Ward 4			Ward 5			Ward 6		
**Independent**	**Paul Norris**	**3,550**	**Independent**	**Percy Wickman**	**8,842**	**U.R.G.E.**	**Bettie Hewes**	**8,429**
**U.R.G.E.**	**Gerry Wright**	**3,462**	**U.R.G.E.**	**Lois Campbell**	**7,696**	**Independent**	**Ed Leger**	**5,641**
U.R.G.E.	Carolyn Nutter	3,393	Independent	Nick Fedorak	2,279	Independent	Ken Kozak	4,154
Independent	Ron Patsula	2,172	Independent	Guy Tessier	1,450	Independent	Wayne Weeks	2,169
Independent	Allen Wasnea	1,190	Independent	Olga Cylurik	929	Independent	Don Massey	2,113
Independent	Bill Broad	817	Independent	Paul Fuog	926	Independent	Bob Durrant	1,661
			E.V.A.	Walter Aiello	467	U.R.G.E.	Fred Atiq	688
			Independent	Paul Bird	260			

=== Public school trustees ===
Party	Candidate	Votes	Elected
Independent	Shirley Forbes	24,566	✓
Independent	Mel Binder	20,757	✓
Independent	Ernie Hodgson	19,315	✓
Independent	Don Massey	19,060	✓
Independent	Jim Wiebe	17,756	✓
Independent	Herb Jamieson	17,582	✓
Independent	Ernie Lund	16,690	✓
Independent	Joan Cowling	16,469	✓
Independent	Elaine Jones	15,993	✓
Independent	Grace Hendrickson	14,375	
Independent	P. Christensen	14,252	
Independent	David Borgstrom	12,331	
Independent	Lorne Mowers	12,252	
Independent	George Luck	9,507	
Independent	Susky Hardin	9,055	
Independent	Julie Loga	7,664	
Independent	Benjamin Doell	7,115	
Independent	John Mason	7,079	
Independent	G. Chandler-Nahumko	6,854	
Independent	John Lakusta	6,489	
Independent	N. A. Chaudhary	5,823	
Independent	Robert Douglas	5,499	

=== Separate (Catholic) school trustees ===
Party	Candidate	Votes	Elected
Independent	Jean McDonald	9,328	✓
Independent	William Green	8,549	✓
Independent	Phil Gibeau	7,728	✓
Independent	Alice Gagne	6,918	✓
Independent	Hugh Tadman	6,883	✓
Independent	Simone Secker	6,410	✓
Independent	Margaret Bouska	5,946	✓
Independent	Raymond Pinkowski	5,492	
Independent	Lyle Lavender	4,132	
Independent	Donald Sikorski	3,757	
Independent	Joseph Hoover	3,538	
Independent	L. Brian Mitchell	3,525	
Independent	Edmund Nagle	3,457	
