= 1980 Caymanian general election =

Caymanian general election

General elections were held in the Cayman Islands in November 1980. The result was a victory for the Team for National Unity led by Jim Bodden, which won eight of the twelve seats in the Legislative Assembly.

== Results ==
Party	Votes	%	Seats
Team for National Unity			8
Progress with Dignity Team			2
Independents			2
Total			12
Registered voters/turnout	8,051	–	
Source: Caribbean Elections
