= 1980 Swiss referendums =

Six referendums were held in Switzerland in 1980. The first two were held on 2 March on a popular initiative on the complete separation of church and state, which was rejected, and a federal resolution on reorganising national supply, which was approved. The next four were held on 30 November on a federal law requiring the wearing of seat belts and helmets, abolishing the cantonal share of stamp duty, the destination of taxes on spirits and changing regulations on breadstuffs, all of which were approved.

== Results ==
=== March: Separation of church and state ===
| Choice | Popular vote | | Cantons | | |
| Choice | Votes | % | Full | Half | Total |
|---|---|---|---|---|---|
| For | 281,475 | 21.1 | 0 | 0 | 0 |
| Against | 1,052,575 | 78.9 | 20 | 6 | 23 |
| Blank votes | 18,661 | – | – | – | – |
| Invalid votes | 1,992 | – | – | – | – |
| Total | 1,354,703 | 100 | 20 | 6 | 23 |
| Registered voters/turnout | 3,907,773 | 34.7 | – | – | – |
Source: Nohlen & Stöver

=== March: National supply ===
| Choice | Popular vote | | Cantons | | |
| Choice | Votes | % | Full | Half | Total |
|---|---|---|---|---|---|
| For | 1,117,007 | 86.1 | 20 | 6 | 23 |
| Against | 181,009 | 13.9 | 0 | 0 | 0 |
| Blank votes | 46,734 | – | – | – | – |
| Invalid votes | 2,006 | – | – | – | – |
| Total | 1,346,756 | 100 | 20 | 6 | 23 |
| Registered voters/turnout | 3,907,773 | 34.5 | – | – | – |
Source: Nohlen & Stöver

=== December: Seat belts and helmets ===
| Choice | Votes | % |
|---|---|---|
| For | 841,901 | 51.6 |
| Against | 791,208 | 48.4 |
| Blank votes | 20,137 | – |
| Invalid votes | 2,078 | – |
| Total | 1,655,324 | 100 |
| Registered voters/turnout | 3,935,792 | 42.1 |
Source: Nohlen & Stöver

=== December: Stamp duty ===
| Choice | Popular vote | | Cantons | | |
| Choice | Votes | % | Full | Half | Total |
|---|---|---|---|---|---|
| For | 1,059,760 | 67.3 | 17 | 6 | 20 |
| Against | 514,995 | 32.7 | 3 | 0 | 3 |
| Blank votes | 70,536 | – | – | – | – |
| Invalid votes | 2,691 | – | – | – | – |
| Total | 1,647,982 | 100 | 20 | 6 | 23 |
| Registered voters/turnout | 3,935,792 | 41.9 | – | – | – |
Source: Nohlen & Stöver

=== December: Spirits tax ===
| Choice | Popular vote | | Cantons | | |
| Choice | Votes | % | Full | Half | Total |
|---|---|---|---|---|---|
| For | 1,127,595 | 71.0 | 18 | 6 | 21 |
| Against | 459,632 | 29.0 | 2 | 0 | 2 |
| Blank votes | 59,197 | – | – | – | – |
| Invalid votes | 2,435 | – | – | – | – |
| Total | 1,648,859 | 100 | 20 | 6 | 23 |
| Registered voters/turnout | 3,935,792 | 41.9 | – | – | – |
Source: Nohlen & Stöver

=== December: Breadstuffs regulations ===
| Choice | Popular vote | | Cantons | | |
| Choice | Votes | % | Full | Half | Total |
|---|---|---|---|---|---|
| For | 1,012,812 | 63.5 | 17 | 6 | 20 |
| Against | 581,204 | 36.5 | 3 | 0 | 3 |
| Blank votes | 53,218 | – | – | – | – |
| Invalid votes | 2,535 | – | – | – | – |
| Total | 1,649,769 | 100 | 20 | 6 | 23 |
| Registered voters/turnout | 3,935,792 | 41.9 | – | – | – |
Source: Nohlen & Stöver
