= 1980 Cape Verdean parliamentary election =

- 7 December 1980

All 63 seats in the National People's Assembly
- Registered: 126,028
- Turnout: 75.77%
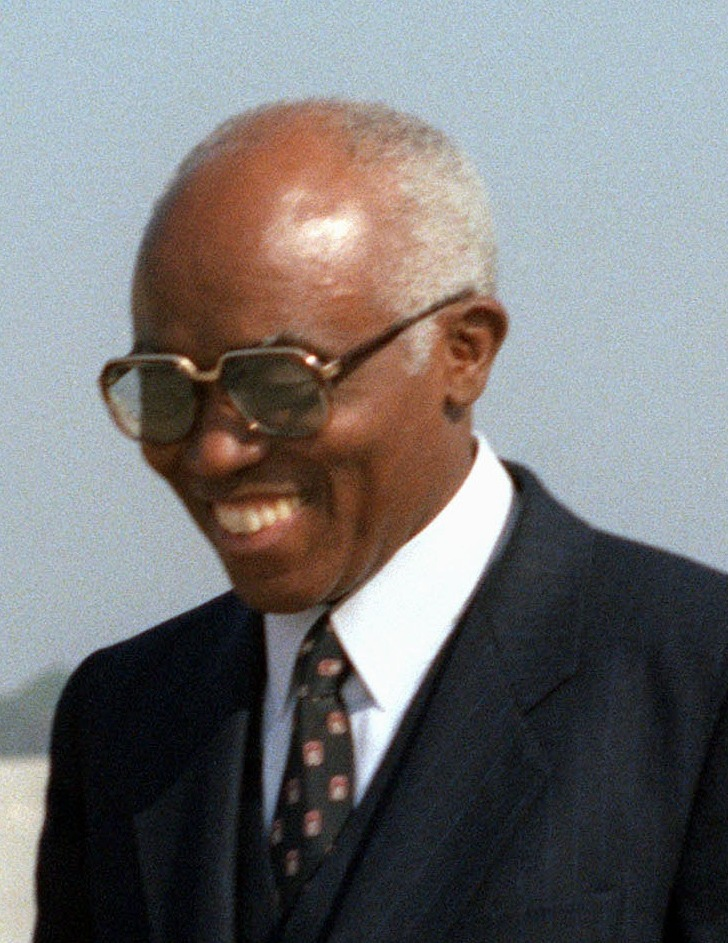
	First party
Leader	Aristides Pereira
Party	PAIGC
Leader's seat	Praia Urbano
Seats won	63
Seat change	▲7
Popular vote	88,309
Percentage	92.6%
- Results by constituency
Prime Minister before election
Aristides Pereira
PAIGC
Elected Prime Minister
Aristides Pereira
PAICV

Parliamentary elections were held in Cape Verde on 7 December 1980. The country was a one-party state at the time, with the African Party for the Independence of Guinea and Cape Verde (PAIGC) as the sole legal party. Its leader was Aristides Pereira. The PAIGC presented a list of 63 candidates and three substitutes to voters to approve.

== Results ==
Party	Votes	%	Seats	+/–
African Party for the Independence of Guinea and Cape Verde	88,309	92.60	63	+8
Against	7,052	7.40	–	–
Total	95,361	100.00	63	+8
Valid votes	95,361	99.87		
Invalid/blank votes	125	0.13		
Total votes	95,486	100.00		
Registered voters/turnout	126,028	75.77		
Source: African Elections Database
