= 1980 Romanian local elections =

Elections in 1980

Local elections were held in the Socialist Republic of Romania on 9 March 1980.

A mandate represented two and a half years, according to 1965 Constitution of Romania.
