= 23 May 1980 Moroccan constitutional referendum =

- 23 May 1980

Results
Choice	Votes	%
Yes	6,849,813	99.62%
No	25,891	0.38%
Valid votes	6,875,704	99.61%
Invalid or blank votes	27,013	0.39%
Total votes	6,902,717	100.00%
Registered voters/turnout	7,130,703	96.8%

A constitutional referendum occurred in Morocco on 23 May 1980. It proposed amendments to article 21 of the 1972 constitution regarding the Regency Council, lowering the King's age of majority from 18 to 16. Official results reported 99.6% approval with 96.8% voter turnout. A second referendum followed one week later concerning articles 43 and 95.

== Results ==
Choice	Votes	%
For	6,849,813	99.62
Against	25,891	0.38
Total	6,875,704	100.00
Valid votes	6,875,704	99.61
Invalid/blank votes	27,013	0.39
Total votes	6,902,717	100.00
Registered voters/turnout	7,130,703	96.80
Source: Nohlen et al.
