= 1980 Palauan constitutional referendum =

14 July 1980

Results
Choice	Votes	%
Yes	3,899	81.16%
No	905	18.84%
Valid votes	4,804	98.06%
Invalid or blank votes	95	1.94%
Total votes	4,899	100.00%
Registered voters/turnout	7,082	69.18%

A constitutional referendum was held in Palau on 14 July 1980. The Constitution of Palau, written after the Trust Territory's decision not to become one of the states of the Federated States of Micronesia in 1978, was approved by 81% of voters.

== Results ==
Choice	Votes	%
For	3,899	81.16
Against	905	18.84
Invalid/blank	95	–
Total	4,899	100
Registered voters/turnout	7,082	69.18
Source: Direct Democracy
