= Laurence Decore =

Canadian lawyer and politician

Laurence Decore CM
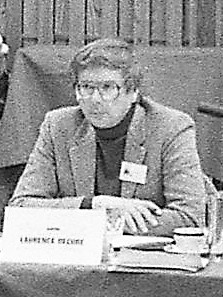
- Decore in 1984

Leader of the Opposition in Alberta
- In office June 15, 1993 – July 15, 1994
- Preceded by: Ray Martin
- Succeeded by: Bettie Hewes

Leader of the Alberta Liberal Party
- In office October 9, 1988 – July 15, 1994
- Preceded by: Nicholas Taylor
- Succeeded by: Bettie Hewes (interim)

31st Mayor of Edmonton
- In office October 17, 1983 – October 17, 1988
- Preceded by: Cecil John Harry Purves
- Succeeded by: Terry Cavanagh
Parliamentary constituencies
Member of the Legislative Assembly of Alberta for Edmonton-Glengarry
In office March 20, 1989 – March 11, 1997
| Preceded by | John Younie |
| Succeeded by | Bill Bonner |
Member of the Edmonton City Council for Ward 2
In office October 16, 1974 – October 19, 1977 Serving with Olivia Butti, David Leadbeater
| Preceded by | Multi-member district |
| Succeeded by | Multi-member district |

Personal details
- Born: Lavrentiy Dikur; June 28, 1940 Vegreville, Alberta, Canada
- Died: November 6, 1999 (aged 59) Edmonton, Alberta, Canada
- Party: Alberta Liberal
- Spouse: Anne Marie Fedoruk
- Children: Michael and Andrea
- Education: University of Alberta
- Profession: Lawyer

Laurence George Decore CM (born Lavrentiy Dikur; June 28, 1940 – November 6, 1999) was a Canadian lawyer and Albertan politician. He was of Ukrainian descent. He was mayor of Edmonton 1983–1988, a member of the Legislative Assembly of Alberta 1989–1997, and leader of the Alberta Liberal Party 1988–1994.

== Early life ==
Decore was born Lavrentiy Dikur (Ukrainian: Лаврентій Дікур) in Vegreville, Alberta on June 28, 1940, the son of future Liberal Party of Canada MP and judge John Decore (Ivan Dikur). While he was a child, the family Anglicized its name to "Decore." He was educated in Vegreville, Ottawa, and after 1957, Edmonton, where he played curling and soccer.

Decore graduated from the University of Alberta in 1961 with B.A. in history and political economy, and in 1964 with an LL.B. He was called to the bar the year of his graduation, and eventually founded the firm Decore & Company. He married Anne Marie Fedoruk (who later became the University of Alberta's Associate Vice President Academic), with whom he had two children, Michael and Andrea.

Decore was involved in a number of business ventures that made him a millionaire. These included the Edmonton cable television station QCTV, a hotel in Jasper, a shopping centre and apartment complex in Lethbridge, and assorted other commercial enterprises.

He was also a commissioned officer of the Royal Canadian Navy who taught naval accounting and supply in Montreal and was a junior officer in the Judge Advocate General's office.

Before entering municipal politics he had already been involved in several community organizations and from 1973 until 1975 he was founding chairman of the Alberta Cultural Heritage Council.

== Political career ==
=== Municipal politics ===
Decore first sought office in the 1971 municipal election, when he ran for alderman in Ward 2. He finished fourth of eleven candidates; among those who defeated him was Cec Purves, against whom Decore would later run for mayor twice. He was elected as an alderman to Edmonton City Council in the 1974 election, in which he finished first of the ward's fourteen candidates (three were elected in the ward). As an alderman he chaired the economic affairs committee, the budget committee and the development appeal board and served as a director of the hospital board, the local board of health, and the Greater Edmonton Foundation.

Decore ran for mayor in 1977. He received nine thousand fewer votes than the winner, Purves, but placed ahead of five candidates including incumbent Terry Cavanagh, who city council had appointed interim mayor after the death of William Hawrelak.

=== Interval ===
Decore stayed out of electoral politics for the next six years, but was active in many community organizations. He was president of the Ukrainian Professional and Business Men's Club, secretary of the Ukrainian Canadian Committee, president of the Professional and Business Men's Association of Canada, a member of the board of directors of the Canadian Foundation for Ukrainian Studies (1977–1981), president of the Ukrainian Canadian Professional and Business Federation (1979–1981), and chairman of the Canadian Consultative Council on Multiculturalism (1980–1983). It was in this last position he led a national lobby for a constitutional amendment acknowledging Canada's multicultural nature. The result was that he helped to draft Section 27 of the Canadian Charter of Rights and Freedoms. For this work he was awarded the Order of Canada.

=== Mayoralty ===
He returned to politics in the 1983 mayoral election when he defeated Purves in a landslide, more than doubling the incumbent's vote count and establishing a new historical plurality record (54,000 votes).

He was re-elected by a similar margin in 1986.

As mayor, Decore eliminated the city's Board of Commissioners - handing more power to its elected city council, put in place a fiscal program that would eliminate the city's debt, took key major steps which began downtown revitalization and won a high-profile battle with the province of Alberta over the city-owned telephone company's right to a fair share of long-distance revenue. He also oversaw the city's recovery after 1987's Edmonton Tornado and expressed the city's sadness over the Edmonton Oilers' trading Wayne Gretzky (the hockey team had won its first four Stanley Cups during Decore's time as mayor).

On October 17, 1988, he resigned to enter provincial politics.

=== Provincial politics ===
As 1988 opened, the Alberta Liberal Party was led by Nicholas Taylor, who had served in this capacity since 1974. For most of those years, the party had been shut out of the Legislative Assembly of Alberta, but in the 1986 election it won its first four seats (including Taylor's) in more than a decade. This wasn't enough for some party faithful, however, and a 1987 leadership review resulted in a 1988 leadership convention (some have suggested that Decore helped orchestrate this result).

Taylor ran to hold the post of leader. His run was opposed by Laurence Decore and Edmonton Meadowlark MLA Grant Mitchell. Decore won a decisive first ballot victory (the post was filled using the two-round system or instant-runoff voting).

In the following year's snap election, he led the party to eight seats, twice as many as it had held at dissolution of the legislature, while also getting the second-highest popular vote, though the NDP retained official opposition status with 16 seats. Decore was elected MLA in Edmonton-Glengarry, defeating New Democrat John Younie. He declared "there is a new party on the horizon", as a Liberal candidate Percy Wickman had unseated Premier Don Getty.

In the legislature, Decore focused his attacks in the government around fiscal responsibility and the province's rapidly rising debt. He was also critical of the government's involvement in the private sector which had, in some high-profile cases, resulted in companies defaulting on huge government loans. The Liberals rose rapidly in the polls, and Progressive Conservative Premier Don Getty resigned in 1992 rather than lead his party into another election that it might well lose.

The Progressive Conservatives' new leader, Environment Minister and former Calgary mayor Ralph Klein, had won the leadership in part by making arguments similar to Decore's. He favoured a near-immediate balancing of the provincial budget and rapid debt repayment thereafter, and declared his government "out of the business of business". In the 1993 election, Decore therefore faced a Premier with whom he agreed on many issues; he coped by arguing that the Progressive Conservatives had, as a party, no moral authority left on the issues on which Klein was campaigning. The campaign was also notable as the former mayors of Edmonton and Calgary were facing off as party leaders.

The Liberals won 32 of the province's 83 seats, the highest percentage they had won since leaving government in 1921 and the highest percentage won by any opposition party in the province's history. They returned to official opposition status for the first time since 1967, while banishing the New Democrats from the legislature.

Decore now led the second-largest opposition caucus in the province's history. However, many Liberal MLAs and party members were unhappy to find themselves in the opposition after expecting to win power for the first time in more than 70 years. The disappointing results led to calls within the party for Decore to step down. Decore resigned his leadership in 1994, and did not seek re-election as MLA in the 1997 election.

== Personal life, death, and legacy ==
His father had been a prominent member of the Ukrainian Orthodox Church of Canada and Laurence attended St. John's Ukrainian Orthodox Cathedral in Edmonton.

After leaving politics, Decore returned to business and became chairman of the Canada-Ukraine Business Initiative. He was admitted to the Order of Canada in 1983, and received an honorary doctorate of laws from the University of Alberta in 1999.

Decore was a two-time cancer survivor, having survived colon cancer in 1990 and liver cancer two years later, but a third incidence killed him in 1999. In a tribute, Prime Minister Jean Chrétien called Decore "an extraordinarily gifted leader" and "a man of vision and perseverance", while Klein said that he "brought great passion and a keen intellect to all he did in public life".

Laurence Decore Lookout, a viewing point overlooking the North Saskatchewan River in Edmonton, is named in Decore's honour, as are the Edmonton Decore electoral district and the Laurence Decore Award for Student Leadership, a provincially endowed scholarship.
