= 1971 Edmonton municipal election =

Municipal election in Alberta, Canada

The 1971 municipal election was held October 13, 1971 to elect a mayor and twelve aldermen to sit on Edmonton City Council and seven trustees to sit on each of the public and separate school boards.

This was the first election in which a ward system was used. Where previously all twelve aldermen were elected in a city-wide district, beginning with this election the councilors were elected in wards, with three councillors elected in each of four wards. (Starting with the 1980 election, this was changed to two aldermen being elected from each of six wards). The election was conducted under the block voting system in which each voter was given as many votes as there were vacancies.

School board trustees were elected at-large no wards used.

The mayor was elected through first-past-the-post voting. All others were elected through plurality block voting.

== Voter turnout ==
In this election, 101,235 ballots cast out of 273,271 eligible voters, for a voter turnout of 37.1%.

== Results ==
(bold indicates elected, italics indicate incumbent)

=== Mayor ===
Party	Candidate	Votes	%
Independent	Ivor Dent	60,948	62.20%
Independent	Julian Kinisky	27,270	27.83%
Independent	Jack Holmes	9,777	9.98%

=== Aldermen ===
Ward 1			Ward 2			Ward 3			Ward 4		
Party	Candidate	Votes	Party	Candidate	Votes	Party	Candidate	Votes	Party	Candidate	Votes
**Ind.**	**Kenneth Newman**	**13,934**	**Ind.**	**Cec Purves**	**10,879**	**Ind.**	**Ed Leger**	**6,688**	**Ind.**	**Una Evans**	**11,574**
**Ind.**	**Dudley Menzies**	**13,663**	**Ind.**	**David Ward**	**9,244**	**Ind.**	**Ron Hayter**	**5,709**	**Ind.**	**Terry Cavanagh**	**8,776**
**Ind.**	**Ches Tanner**	**10,960**	**Ind.**	**Alex Fallow**	**8,188**	**Ind.**	**William McLean**	**5,454**	**Ind.**	**Buck Olsen**	**7,550**
Ind.	Morris Weinlos	10,053	Ind.	Laurence Decore	7,899	Ind.	Sam Agronin	4,735	Ind.	William Boytzun	7,272
Ind.	I. Gliener	7,465	Ind.	Thomas Baker	7,565	Ind.	Allan McTavish	4,202	Ind.	Roy Jamha	5,449
Ind.	Terry Laing	6,752	Ind.	Cecil Rhodes	3,498	Ind.	Irene Domecki	3,417	Ind.	Natalka Faryna	3,894
Ind.	Bob Bothwell	5,332	Ind.	Eric Reilly	3,482	Ind.	Joe Donahue	2,873	Ind.	Allan Welsh	3,755
Ind.	John Ludwig	4,043	Ind.	Percy Wickman	3,277	Ind.	John Kloster	2,772	Ind.	Harold Oppelt	3,670
Ind.	Joseph Bugis	3,111	Ind.	Jane Weaver	3,241	Ind.	Rory Nugent	2,214	Ind.	Alex Muunzel	3,330
Ind.	George Luck	2,950	Ind.	Victor Sedo	2,432	Ind.	R. C. Squair	2,142	Ind.	Ken McAuley	3,143
Ind.	Maureen Wanczura	2,491	Ind.	Paul Fuog	1,647	Ind.	Gerhard Volkmann	2,008	Ind.	Douglas Tomlinson	2,987
						Ind.	Ernest McCormack	2,003	Ind.	Stephen Corby	2,802
						Ind.	J. A. Robinson	1,780	Ind.	John Lakusta	2,167
						Ind.	Bernard Mazurewicz	1,433	Ind.	Lori Phillips	1,877
						Ind.	Clarence Bolton	1,209	Ind.	Gerald Lorente	1,577
						Ind.	Ennio Gentili	1,154	Ind.	Frances Kelemen	1,563
						Ind.	Ruby Lyons	860	Ind.	Fred Haidner	737
						Ind.	Arthur Shaw	636			

=== Public school trustees ===
Party	Candidate	Votes	Elected
Independent	Edith Rogers	22,170	✓
Better Education Association	Lois Campbell	21,786	✓
Independent	James Falconer	19,412	✓
Independent	John Paterson	18,820	✓
Independent	Vernon Johnson	17,003	✓
Independent	Donald Kennedy	16,752	✓
Independent	Richard Jamieson	14,166	✓
Independent	John Chalmers	13,373	
Better Education Association	Murray Campbell	13,069	
Independent	Howard Clifford	12,626	
Independent	Fred Miller	12,313	
Independent	A A Aldridge	11,555	
Independent	Robert Bauer	11,554	
Independent	Roy Le Riche	11,380	
Better Education Association	Robert McAlpine	10,969	
Better Education Association	Rex Beach	10,832	
Independent	Anna Pollock	10,280	
Independent	Jay Purnell	9,940	
Better Education Association	Russel Dzenick	9,508	
Independent	Edith Hnytka	8,814	
Better Education Association	Alan Robertson	8,808	
Independent	George Kuschminder	8,113	
Independent	T O Walhovd	7,966	
Better Education Association	Metro Gulutsan	7,763	
Independent	Bill Tiffin	6,448	
Independent	E R Daniels	6,208	
Independent	Donald Skyes	5,869	
Independent	James Lawson	5,536	
Independent	Dorothy Preston	5,137	
Independent	Janet Tegart	4,724	
Independent	Laura Tuomi	4,225	
Independent	James Miller	3,964	
Independent	Noel Round	3,496	
Independent	Frank Vanner	2,984	
Independent	Donald Topilo	2,887	
Independent	Murray Fehr	2,792	
Independent	John Ryll	2,502	
Independent	Albert Hencsh	2,434	
Independent	Dave Poholko	1,851	

=== Separate (Catholic) school trustees ===
- **Georges Brosseau** - 13549
- **Jean Forest** - 11991
- **Robert Sabourin** - 10250
- **Leo Floyd** - 9395
- **Jean McDonald** - 9206
- **W McNeill** - 8251
- **Larry Messier** - 7676
- Julia Kerans - 7492
- A M Ambrock - 6479
- Nicholas Sheptycki - 6045
- Orest Eveneshen - 6037
- Glen Hughes - 5052
- Maurice Legris - 4627
- Matt Reiser - 3666
- Julian Hnatiw - 3523
