= Dick Mather =

Canadian politician (1941–1997)

Richard "Dick" Mather

City of Edmonton Public School Trustee
- In office October 17, 1983 – October 16, 1989
- Constituency: At Large
- In office October 16, 1989 – October 16, 1995
- Preceded by: New Ward
- Succeeded by: Ward Abolished
- Constituency: Ward 6

City of Edmonton Alderman
- In office October 16, 1995 – October 26, 1998 Serving with Terry Cavanagh
- Preceded by: Sheila McKay
- Succeeded by: Dave Thiele
- Constituency: Ward 6

Personal details
- Born: July 20, 1941 Edmonton, Alberta
- Died: August 13, 1997 (aged 56) Edmonton, Alberta
- Party: Independent (municipal); Representative (provincial)
- Spouse: Weslyn Mather

Richard Mather (July 20, 1941 – August 13, 1997) was a municipal politician from Alberta, Canada. He served as a member of Edmonton city council from 1995 until his death in 1997. He also served as a public school trustee from 1983 to 1995.

== Early life ==
Richard Mather was born in Edmonton, Alberta, Canada on July 20, 1941. He married Weslyn Mather.

== Political career ==
Mather ran for a seat as an Edmonton public school trustee in the 1983 Edmonton municipal election and won the fifth place seat out of 17 candidates in the at large vote. He was re-elected again in 1986, 1989, 1992 before retiring as a School Trustee in 1995. In 1989 Mather became the first President of the Public School Boards' Association of Alberta. He served in that role until 1991.

Mather was prominently involved in the Representative Party of Alberta. He ran for provincial office twice under the banner, losing both times. He first ran for the party as a candidate in a by-election held in Edmonton-Whitemud on December 11, 1985. Mather finished in third place, losing to Premier Don Getty, taking just over 8% of the popular vote.

He ran for party a second time in the 1986 Alberta general election in the electoral district of Edmonton-Mill Woods. He would not do as well as the by-election and finished in fourth place, losing to New Democrat Gerry Gibeault.

Mather left his position as a school trustee at the end of his term in 1995 to run as an Alderman in Ward 6. He won the second place seat finishing close behind front runner Terry Cavanagh. Mather died from a heart attack while still in his first term on August 13, 1997.
