= 30 May 1980 Moroccan constitutional referendum =

30 May 1980

Results
Choice	Votes	%
Yes	6,158,369	96.67%
No	212,425	3.33%
Valid votes	6,370,794	99.09%
Invalid or blank votes	58,683	0.91%
Total votes	6,429,477	100.00%
Registered voters/turnout	7,079,518	90.82%

A constitutional referendum was held in Morocco on 30 May 1980. The referendum asked voters if they approved of changes to articles 43 (elections and term) and 95 (local assemblies) of the 1972 constitution, which would extend the term of Parliament from four to six years and the term of the president of the House of Representatives from one to three years. The changes were approved by 97% of voters, with a 91% turnout.

== Results ==
Choice	Votes	%
For	6,158,369	96.67
Against	212,425	3.33
Total	6,370,794	100.00
Valid votes	6,370,794	99.09
Invalid/blank votes	58,683	0.91
Total votes	6,429,477	100.00
Registered voters/turnout	7,079,518	90.82
Source: Nohlen et al.
