= Bruce Campbell (Alberta politician) =

Canadian politician (1923–2011)

- During his term as alderman

Alderman on the Edmonton City Council (Ward 1)
- In office 1986–1995 Serving with Helen Paull (86-92) & Leroy Chahley (92-95)
- Preceded by: Olivia Butti & G. Lyall Roper
- Succeeded by: Wendy Kinsella

Personal details
- Born: June 6, 1923 Cadomin, Alberta, Canada
- Died: March 12, 2011 (aged 87) Edmonton, Alberta, Canada
- Resting place: Edmonton, Alberta, Canada
- Spouse: Phoebe
- Children: four
- Occupation: Carpenter, contractor

Bruce Campbell (June 6, 1923 – March 12, 2011) was a Canadian politician, commercial contractor, carpenter, and Rotarian. He was born in Cadomin, Alberta, and resided in Edmonton, Alberta, Canada, for most of his life.

Involved in the construction industry most of his life, Campbell began in 1946 as a carpenter apprentice for C.H. Whitham Ltd., and was promoted to superintendent. He was also the general superintendent of Forest Construction Company from 1955 to 1959, and founded Camwil Construction in 1959 which he operated until 1985.

Campbell served three terms as alderman of the City of Edmonton from 1986 to 1995, sitting on the Edmonton City Council. During his tenure he served as chair of many committees including the Police Commission, City Hall construction project, and others.

Campbell was also a mediator and arbitrator specializing in the construction industries.

As a Rotarian and community leader Campbell garnered numerous awards. A youth centre was named in his honour, the Bruce Campbell Youth Centre.

Campbell was married to wife Phoebe, with whom he had four children.
