= Kiviaq =

Canadian football player and politician

Kiviaq (David Charles Ward)

Edmonton City Councillor
- In office 1968–1974

Personal details
- Born: January 23, 1936 Chesterfield Inlet, Northwest Territories (now Nunavut), Canada
- Died: April 24, 2016 (aged 80) Edmonton, Alberta, Canada
- Education: Northwestern State University; Washington State University
- Occupation: Lawyer

Kiviaq (also known as David Charles Ward; January 23, 1936 – April 24, 2016) was a Canadian Inuk lawyer, politician, and former sportsman. He was raised in Edmonton, Alberta.

In 1968, he became involved in politics, being elected to Edmonton City Council. He had won the Vanier Award as one of Canada's "Five Most Outstanding Young Men," for his work as a public relations officer and recreational director for the city. He served two terms on the council as an alderman, and ran for mayor in the 1970s with an unsuccessful outcome. As a personable politician, he successfully lobbied for the Commonwealth Games to be held in Edmonton. He ran his own open-line radio show at CJCA and CJOI-FM, with interview subjects such as Muhammad Ali. After attending law school, Kiviaq was the first Inuk to become a lawyer, and was responsible for several important advances in establishing the legal rights of Inuit. He was called to the bar in 1983, a moment recognized in a letter from then-Prime Minister Pierre Trudeau as a "solid and progressive achievement in the history of your people." In September 2000, Mr. Ward made the initial application to change his name back to Kiviaq, the single-word Inuktituk name that his mother and Caucasian step-father gave him at birth. In 2001, he won that right. In 2003, Edmonton City Council and mayor Bill Smith declared March 14 "Kiviaq Day".

== Athletic career ==
Growing up in Edmonton, Kiviaq took to boxing to defend himself against racially motivated abuse from other children. He won his first Golden Gloves championship at age 13. He later became a prizefighter, winning 108 of 112 fights, capturing a string of provincial and Golden Glove championships. In 1955, aged 19, he became the first Inuk to play on the Edmonton Eskimos football team. However, Kiviaq never played a regular-season game: before the season started, he had an accidental slip on the wet field which was followed by concurrent hits from three opposing players. However, despite his severe injuries, he subsequently made a full recovery. He later won a scholarship to play football at Northwestern State College in Louisiana. He was still eligible to play college ball because he had never earned a salary playing for the Eskimos.

== Health ==
Kiviaq had Ménière's disease, and for much of his life was unable to travel on an airplane or be a passenger in a vehicle without becoming ill. However, by 2009, surgeries to treat his cancer also resulted in him no longer being afflicted by travel sickness. He battled cancer for many years until he died on April 24, 2016, in an Edmonton hospice.

== Documentary ==
He is the subject of the documentary film Kiviaq vs. Canada, by award-winning producer Zacharias Kunuk.

== See also ==
- Indigenous Canadian personalities
