= Bettie Hewes =

Canadian politician (1924–2001)

MLA for Edmonton-Gold Bar
- In office 1986–1997
- Preceded by: Al Hiebert
- Succeeded by: Hugh MacDonald

Personal details
- Born: March 12, 1924 Brampton, Ontario
- Died: November 6, 2001 (aged 77) Brockville, Ontario
- Party: Alberta Liberal Party

Elizabeth Jane "Bettie" Hewes (March 12, 1924 – November 6, 2001) was a politician from Alberta, Canada. She served both as Edmonton city councillor and as Liberal MLA.

Hewes graduated from the University of Toronto in 1944 with a degree in occupational therapy. From 1964 to 1967, she was the executive director of the Canadian Mental Health Association, and from 1967 to 1974, she was Director of the Edmonton Social Planning Council.

She served on Edmonton city council from 1974 to 1984. During that period, she was a leading member of an enlightened urban reform group called Urban Reform Group Edmonton (URGE), which eventually elected several members to Council. She served as acting mayor after the death of William Hawrelak in 1975.

She served as chairman of the board of Canadian National Railway from 1984 to 1985. She was the first woman to hold that position.

She was elected to the Legislative Assembly of Alberta in the 1986 provincial election as the member for Edmonton-Gold Bar under the banner of the Liberal Party. She was re-elected in 1989 and 1993. In 1993, she received over 10,000 votes, the largest number won by any candidate in that election. In 1994, she served as the interim leader of the Liberal Party. She did not run in the 1997 election.

She died of a heart attack in 2001.
