= Ron Hayter =

Canadian politician (1936–2018)

Edmonton City Councilor Ward 2
- In office 2001–2010
- Preceded by: Rose Rosenberger
- Succeeded by: Ward abolished

Edmonton City Councilor Ward 2
- In office 1980–1995
- Preceded by: New ward
- Succeeded by: Rose Rosenberger

Edmonton City Councilor Ward 3
- In office 1971–1980
- Preceded by: New ward
- Succeeded by: Ward abolished

Personal details
- Born: July 30, 1936 Regina, Saskatchewan
- Died: April 21, 2018 (aged 81) St. Albert, Alberta, Canada
- Spouse: Grace Jacqueline (Jac'y) Bacon Hayter
- Children: Sparkle Hayter; Sandra Hayter; Nevin Hayter; Hudson Hayter
- Occupation: Reporter
- Baseball career

Member of the Canadian

Baseball Hall of Fame
- Induction: 2006

Ronald John Hayter (July 30, 1936 – April 21, 2018) served as city councilor of Edmonton, Alberta, from 1971 until 1995. Hayter stepped down from the council in 1995 to join the National Parole Board. In the 2001 municipal election, Hayter returned to the council and was re-elected in both 2004 and 2007 before retiring in 2010. Hayter served eleven terms totaling thirty-three years, making Hayter Edmonton's longest serving councilor. He served under eight mayors and with 68 other councilors. During his tenure, he spearheaded the Shaw Convention Center, the Light Rail Transit system, waste recycling programs, the preservation of the River Valley wilderness area, and the promotion of arts. He was proud of his lifelong efforts to promote the rights of and create reconciliation with the First Nations communities.

== Background ==
Hayter was born in Hudson Bay, Saskatchewan on July 30, 1936, to Vera Smith Hayter and Raleigh "Slim" Hayter. Raleigh was a Saskatchewan lumberman who later lived as a trapper in Northern Alberta on the Little Berland River until he died in 1984. Ron was the oldest of six boys, all raised in the lumber camp at Akosane, Saskatchewan, and brought up in a poor family. His father was opposed to schooling, so Hayter did not attend school until age 12 when his father was incarcerated for poaching deer.

Hayter graduated at 18 and worked for Margaret Lally "Ma" Murray as a reporter for the Alaska Highway News. In 1957 when he was 22, he got a scoop about the collapse of the Peace River Suspension Bridge that brought him national attention and a job offer at the Edmonton Journal. The night his first child, author Sparkle Hayter, was born, he appeared live on the CBC quiz show Front Page Challenge to discuss the Peace River suspension river collapse story. Hayter later became a correspondent for Time magazine.

== Sports ==
An amateur boxer and baseball player in his youth, he went on to sit on international sporting bodies, including the World Boxing Association (WBA). Hayter represented Canada for 18 years at the International Baseball Federation (IBAF), receiving the IBAF's President Award in 1990, and headed the Canadian Professional Boxing Federation for many years. Hayter founded the Edmonton International Baseball Foundation (EIBF), which, amongst others, organized the first IBAF World Cup of Women's Baseball in 2004. He was a judge at some world heavyweight bouts and helped bring baseball to the Summer Olympics.

In 2006, he was inducted into both the Canadian Baseball Hall of Fame and the Canadian Boxing Hall of Fame. Hayter had previously been inducted into the Alberta Sports Hall of Fame in 1978 and the Edmonton Sports Hall of Fame in 1996. In 1993, he served as president of the Federation of Canadian Municipalities. Later on, former Prime Minister of Canada Lester B. Pearson hired Hayter as an advisor to help create Sport Canada, which supports sports policy in the country. He received the Vanier Award as an "Outstanding Young Canadian" in 1974, and the Queen's Jubilee Medal for community service in 2004.

== Family ==
Hayter was married to Grace Jacqueline (Jac'y) Bacon Hayter, who predeceased him in 2005. He was the father of four children: writer Sparkle Hayter, Sandra Hayter, Nevin Hayter, and Hudson Hayter, who died in infancy. He was the nephew of the late bush pilot and aviation pioneer Henry W. "Harry" Hayter, who was inducted into Canada's Aviation Hall of Fame. In his later years, Hayter was diagnosed with dementia and died of pneumonia on April 21, 2018, in St. Albert, Alberta, at the age of 81 years old.
