= 1959 Edmonton municipal election =

Municipal election in Alberta, Canada

The 1959 Edmonton municipal election was held October 14, 1959, in Edmonton, Alberta, Canada, to elect a mayor and five aldermen to sit on Edmonton City Council and four trustees to sit on each of the public and separate school boards. The electorate also decided eleven plebiscite questions.

There were ten aldermen on city council, but five of the positions were already filled: Frederick John Mitchell, George Prudham, Donald Bowen, Ethel Wilson, and Laurette Douglas were all elected to two-year terms in 1958 and were still in office (in fact, Mitchell was in office as mayor, having been appointed four weeks earlier by council to replace William Hawrelak (resigned September 9, 1959), but city bylaws allowed him to resume his aldermanic term once a new mayor was elected).

There were seven trustees on the public school board, but three of the positions were already filled: J. Percy Page, Robert Thorogood, and William Orobko were elected to two-year terms in 1958 and were still in office. The same was true on the separate board, where Leo Lemieux, Vincent Dantzer, and E D Stack were continuing.

== Voter turnout ==
There were 52357 ballots cast out of 150062 eligible voters, for a voter turnout of 34.9%.

== Results ==
- **bold** indicates elected
- italics indicate incumbent
- SS indicates representative for Edmonton's South Side, with a minimum South Side representation instituted after the city of Strathcona, south of the North Saskatchewan River, amalgamated into Edmonton on February 1, 1912.

=== Mayor ===
Party	Candidate	Votes	%
Citizens' Committee and Civic Reform Association	Elmer Roper	25,465	49.02%
Independent	James Harper Prowse	19,318	37.19%
Independent	William Pasternak	6624	12.75%
Independent	John Thomas Bennett	542	1.04%

=== Aldermen ===
Party	Candidate	Votes		Elected
Citizens' Committee & Civic Reform Association	William Henning	27,825	SS	✓
Civic Reform Association	Angus McGugan	22,711	SS	✓
Civic Reform Association	Ed Leger	21,372	SS	✓
Civic Reform Association	Gordon McClary	19,269	–	✓
Citizens' Committee	McKim Ross	17,950	SS	✓
Citizens' Committee	Cliffard Roy	17,172	SS	
Citizens' Committee	Morris Weinlos	16,769		
Civic Reform Association	J. Les Bodie	15,077		
Citizens' Committee	Robert McDonald	14,592		
Independent	Ivor Dent	13,870	SS	
Edmonton Voters Association	Julia Kiniski	9,703		
Independent	Allan Welsh	8,824		
Independent	Orval Allen	7,671	SS	
Independent	Charles Simmonds	7,629	SS	
Independent	Stan Rogalski	3,787		
Edmonton Voters Association	E. J. (Slim) Powell	3,050		
Edmonton Voters Association	Walter Doskoch	2,639		

=== Public school trustees ===
Party	Candidate	Votes		Elected
Citizens' Committee & Civic Reform Association	Angus MacDonald	26,928		✓
Civic Reform Association	Edith Rogers	24,893		✓
Citizens' Committee & Civic Reform Association	Vernon Johnson	22,467	SS	✓
Civic Reform Association	Murray Stewart Cooke	20,707		
Citizens' Committee	Ernest Hanna	18,685		
Citizens' Committee	Douglas Thomson	14,742	SS	✓
Independent	David Graham	12,641		
Edmonton Voters Association	John Rawluk	3,685		

=== Separate (Catholic) school trustees ===
Party	Candidate	Votes		Elected
Independent	Joseph Moreau	7,165		✓
Independent	Orest Demco	6,215		✓
Independent	Catherine McGrath	6,158		✓
Independent	Henry Carrigan	5,952	SS	✓
Independent	Russell Burke	5,892	SS	

=== Plebiscites ===
- Plebiscite items required a minimum two-thirds "Yes" majority to bring about action

==== Fluoridation of Water ====
Shall fluorides, for the prevention of tooth decay, be added to the City water supply sufficient to bring the fluoride content of City water up to the level of one part fluoride to one million parts of water?

- Yes - 27946
- **No** - 22166

==== Landfill ====
Shall Council pass a bylaw creating a debenture debt in the sum of $75,000.00 for the purchase of land to be used as a refuse disposal area employing the sanitary fill method?

- **Yes** - 20803
- No - 8925

==== Traffic Lights ====
Shall Council pass a bylaw creating a debenture debt in the sum of $160,000.00 in order to purchase and locate traffic lights on certain highway intersections within the City?

- **Yes** - 22886
- No - 7128

==== Paving ====
Shall Council pass a bylaw creating a debenture debt in the sum of $250,000.00 for the City share of standard paving of arterial and residential streets?

- **Yes** - 24502
- No - 5528

==== Parks ====
Shall Council pass a bylaw creating a debenture debt in the sum of $750,000.00 for constructing or improving park areas or playgrounds and circles, buffer zones, ravine side boulevards, small parks and triangles?

- **Yes** - 21718
- No - 8154

==== Railway Underpass ====
Shall Council pass a bylaw creating a debenture debt in the sum of $300,00.00 for the City share of constructing an underpass of the Canadian National Railway tracks at the crossing of 127 Street at 126 Avenue?

- **Yes** - 21420
- No - 9218

==== Bridge over Mill Creek Ravine ====
Shall Council pass a bylaw creating a debenture debt in the sum of $500,000.00 for the City share of constructing a four lane bridge to replace the existing structure over Mill Creek Ravine at 82nd Avenue?

- **Yes** - 23490
- No - 6729

==== Royal Alexandra Hospital Expansion ====
Shall Council pass a bylaw creating a debenture debt in the sum of $3,000,000.00 so that the patient bed capacity of the new Royal Alexandra Hospital approved in 1958 may be increased by 300 beds and to buy equipment?

- **Yes** - 25018
- No - 5911

==== Swimming Pool ====
Shall Council pass a bylaw creating a debenture debt in the sum of $350,000.00 for the City share of constructing an indoor swimming Pool at Eastglen Composite High School situated at 114th Avenue and 68th Street?

- Yes - 13842
- **No** - 15577

==== Youth Shelter ====
Shall Council pass a bylaw creating a debenture debt in the sum of $175,000.00 for the purpose of constructing an Emergency Receiving Home for neglected children?

- **Yes** - 25703
- No - 4802

==== Bridges over MacKinnon and MacKenzie ravines ====
Shall Council pass a bylaw creating a debenture debt in the sum of $1,000,000.00 for the purpose of constructing two 4 lane bridges to replace the existing structures located at 142 Street and MacKinnon Ravine, and 142 Street and MacKenzie Ravine?

- Yes - 16743
- **No** - 12645
