= 1962 Edmonton municipal election =

Municipal election in Alberta, Canada

The 1962 municipal election was held October 17, 1962 to elect five aldermen to sit on Edmonton City Council and three trustees to sit on each of the public and separate school boards. The electorate also decided two plebiscite questions. No election for mayor was held because Elmer Roper was one year into a two-year term.

There were ten aldermen on city council, but five of the positions were already filled: McKim Ross, Angus McGugan, Stanley Milner, Gordon McClary, and John Leslie Bodie were all elected to two-year terms in 1961 and were still in office.

There were seven trustees on the public school board, but four of the positions were already filled: Eric Duggan, Vernon Johnson, Edith Rogers, and P William Jones were elected to two-year terms in 1961 and were still in office. The same was true on the separate board, where Joseph Moreau, A A Gorman, Orest Demco, and Harry Carrigan were continuing.

This was the last election held under the old system whereby members of council were elected to staggered two-year terms. Beginning in 1964, all members of council were elected to two-year terms in the same year. The 1963 election was a transition election, in that all members elected this year were elected for one-year terms, to allow every position to be elected anew in 1964, and then every two years thereafter (in effect until 1968, when switch was made to three-year terms).

== Voter turnout ==
There were 42146 ballots cast out of 165940 eligible voters, for a voter turnout of 25.4%.

== Results ==
- **bold** indicates elected
- italics indicate incumbent
- SS indicates representative for Edmonton's South Side, with a minimum SS representation instituted after the city of Strathcona, south of the North Saskatchewan River, amalgamated into Edmonton on February 1, 1912. This appears to be the final election to use this system, moving to an unencumbered at-large system in the 1963 election and a ward system in the 1971 election.

=== Aldermen ===
Party	Candidate	Votes		Elected
Civic Government Association	Frederick John Mitchell	25,768		✓
Civic Government Association	George Prudham	24,542	SS	✓
Civic Government Association	Ethel Wilson	28,690		✓
Civic Government Association	Morris Weinlos	28,872		✓
Civic Government Association	Vincent Dantzer	19,970		✓
Independent	Ed Leger	15,003		
Independent	Bjarne Larson	13,133		
Civic Rights Protective Association	Julia Kiniski	12,643		
Independent	Joseph Tannous	8,597		
Civic Rights Protective Association	Paul Stepa	4,576		
Civic Rights Protective Association	Albert Hensch	3,670		
Independent	Walter Mackowecki	3,033		
Civic Rights Protective Association	Ivar Vanags	2,528		

=== Public school trustees ===
Party	Candidate	Votes	Elected
Better Education Association	Milton Lazerte	16,016	✓
Civic Government Association	James Falconer	14,532	✓
Better Education Association	Helen Sinclair	14,297	✓
Better Education Association	Walter Gainer	13,772	
Civic Government Association	A. K. Miller	12,199	
Civic Government Association	Peter Stewart	9,640	
Independent	Anna Pollock	5,432	
Independent	Paul Lloyd	3,379	
Independent	Laura Tuomi	3,153	

=== Separate (Catholic) school trustees ===
Party	Candidate	Votes	Elected
Independent	Edward Stack	5,472	✓
Independent	Jean McDonald	5,353	✓
Independent	Bill Diachuk	4,496	✓
Independent	John Barbeau	4,200	
Independent	Roy Watson	3,491	

=== Plebiscites ===
==== Term of Civic Officials ====
Should present election procedure under the City Act be continued whereby half of the Aldermen and half the School Board representatives are elected each year for a two-year term, and the Mayor is elected for a two-year term every two years? - 13197

OR

Should the election system be changed so that a Municipal election for Mayor, Aldermen and for the School Board Representatives will only be required every two years with all members, when elected, to sit for a term of two years? - 16101

OR

Should the election system be changed so that a Municipal election for Mayor, Aldermen, and for School Board representatives will only be required every three years with all members, when elected, to sit for a term of three years? - 7821

==== The Early Closing of Shops Bylaw and Food Stores ====
Do you Favor the passing of a bylaw to amend bylaw No.1716 being the Early Closing of Shops bylaw, so that the amended bylaw will exempt all food stores in Edmonton, regardless of size, from all provisions of the Early Closing Bylaw if the principal business of the store or shop is the sale of food?

- Yes - 13006
- **No** - 27587
