= 1957 Edmonton municipal election =

Municipal election in Alberta, Canada

The 1957 municipal election was held November 3, 1957 to elect a mayor and five aldermen to sit on Edmonton City Council and four trustees to sit on the public school board (Michael O'Byrne, Orest Demco, Catherine McGrath, and Joseph Moreau were acclaimed to two-year terms on the separate school board). The electorate also decided seven plebiscite questions.

The election would normally have fallen on October 16 (the third Wednesday in October), but was delayed because of the provincial plebiscite on October 30.

There were ten aldermen on city council, but five of the positions were already filled: Frederick John Mitchell, Ethel Wilson, Laurette Douglas, Giffard Main, and Donald Bowen were all elected to two-year terms in 1956 and were still in office.

There were seven trustees on the public school board, but three of the positions were already filled: J. Percy Page, John Thorogood, and William Orobko were elected to two-year terms in 1956 and were still in office. The same was true on the separate board, where Vincent Dantzer, John Bernard Kane, and Leo Lemieux were continuing.

== Voter turnout ==
There were 49955 ballots cast out of 141532 eligible voters, for a voter turnout of 35.3%.

== Results ==
(bold indicates elected, italics indicate incumbent)

=== Mayor ===
Party	Candidate	Votes	%
Citizens' Committee	William Hawrelak	32,312	65.15%
Independent	Edwin Clarke	13,003	26.22%
Edmonton Voters Association	Charles Simmonds	4,282	8.63%

=== Aldermen ===
Party	Candidate	Votes		Elected
Citizens' Committee	Cliffard Roy	25,459	SS	✓
Citizens' Committee	William Connelly	25,100		✓
Citizens' Committee	Hu Harries	24,833	SS	✓
Citizens' Committee	Reginald Easton	24,545		✓
Citizens' Committee	James Falconer	23,101		✓
Edmonton Voters Association	Charles Thompson	13,001		
Independent	Ivor Dent	12,503	SS	
Edmonton Property Owners Association	Edith Rogers	8,794		
Edmonton Voters Association	David Graham	8,240		
Independent	Julia Kiniski	7,444		
Edmonton Voters Association	Orval Allen	7,072	SS	
Independent	Tempest Aitken	6,744		
Independent	Thomas Graham	6,333		
Edmonton Property Owners Association	Vincent McMahon	5,391	SS	
Edmonton Voters Association	George Rankel	4,215		
Edmonton Property Owners Association	James Bamber	3,785		
Edmonton Property Owners Association	Gustave Querengesser	3,560		
Edmonton Property Owners Association	Alfred Kynnersley	2,991	SS	
Independent	Stan Rogalski	2,483		

=== Public school trustees ===
Party	Candidate	Votes		Elected
Citizens' Committee	Ernest Hanna	20,477		✓
Citizens' Committee	Angus MacDonald	20,690		✓
Citizens' Committee	Robert Johnson	17,527	SS	✓
Citizens' Committee	Douglas Thomson	16,861	SS	✓
Edmonton Voters Association	Oscar Krueger	14,200		
Edmonton Property Owners Association	Elizabeth Scott	9,913	SS	
Edmonton Voters Association	Frances Shore	8,751		
Edmonton Voters Association	Jack Hennig	8,607	SS	
Edmonton Property Owners Association	Clifford Hackett	6,341		
Edmonton Voters Association	John Lyon	6,123		
Edmonton Property Owners Association	Herbert Nichols	5,528		

=== Separate (Catholic) school trustees ===
Party	Candidate	Votes	Elected
Independent	Michael O'Byrne	Acclaimed	✓
Independent	Orest Demco	Acclaimed	✓
Independent	Catherine McGrath	Acclaimed	✓
Independent	Joseph Moreau	Acclaimed	✓

=== Plebiscites ===
==== Fluoridation of Water ====
Shall fluorides, for the prevention of tooth decay, be added to the City water supply sufficient to bring the fluoride content of City water up to the level of one part fluoride to one million parts of water?

- Yes - 30420
- **No** - 16626

==== Paving ====
Shall Council pass a bylaw creating a debenture debt in the sum of $965,000.00 for the City share of standard paving of arterial and residential streets?

- **Yes** - 22182
- No - 5022

==== Parks ====
Shall Council pass a bylaw creating a debenture debt in the sum of $200,000.00 for the improvement of City parks and the commencement of work on unsubdivided park land, circles, buffer zones, ravine side boulevards and similar works?

- **Yes** - 20202
- No - 6479

==== Traffic Lights ====
Shall Council pass a bylaw creating a debenture debt in the sum of $100,000.00 in order to purchase and install additional traffic lights at various locations within the City?

- **Yes** - 21048
- No - 5692

==== Library ====
Shall Council pass a bylaw creating a debenture debt in the sum of $100,000.00 in order to construct and equip a branch of the Edmonton Public Library in a location within the City?

- Yes - 15287
- **No** - 10521

==== Royal Alexandra Hospital ====
Shall Council pass a bylaw creating a debenture debt in the sum of $250,000.00 to provide necessary renovations to the existing portion of the Royal Alexandra Hospital and equipment for the Hospital?

- **Yes** - 21258
- No - 5657

==== Fire Hall ====
Shall Council pass a bylaw creating a debenture debt in the sum of $245,000.00 in order to build and provide equipment for a Fire Hall at 98th Street and 101A Avenue?

- **Yes** - 18418
- No - 7696
