= 1961 Edmonton municipal election =

Municipal election in Alberta, Canada

In Alberta, Canada, the 1961 municipal election was held October 18, 1961 to elect a mayor and five aldermen to sit on Edmonton City Council and four trustees to sit on each of the public and separate school boards. The electorate also decided six plebiscite questions.

There were ten aldermen on city council, but five of the positions were already filled: Frederick John Mitchell, George Prudham, Morris Weinlos, Ethel Wilson, and Milton Lazerte were all elected to two-year terms in 1960 and were still in office.

There were seven trustees on the public school board, but three of the positions were already filled: Warren Edward (Ted) Smith, John Andrews, and Shirley Forbes were elected to two-year terms in 1960 and were still in office. The same was true on the separate board, where Leo Lemieux, Edward Stack, and John Barbeau were continuing.

== Voter turnout ==
There were 59343 ballots cast out of 169940 eligible voters, for a voter turnout of 37.2%.

== Results ==
(bold indicates elected, italics indicate incumbent)

=== Mayor ===
Party	Candidate	Votes	%
Civic Government Association	Elmer Roper	37,600	63.90%
Civic Reform Association	Ed Leger	13,106	22.27%
Independent	Ronald Simmons	8,134	13.82%

=== Aldermen ===
Party	Candidate	Votes		Elected
Civic Government Association	McKim Ross	33,853	SS	✓
Civic Government Association	Angus McGugan	31,123	SS	✓
Civic Government Association	Stanley Milner	27,126	SS	✓
Civic Government Association	Gordon McClary	27,208		✓
Civic Government Association	John Leslie Bodie	23,222		✓
Civic Reform Association	Bjarne Larson	15,006	SS	
Civic Reform Association	Charles Simmonds	13,584	SS	
Independent	Julia Kiniski	12,451		
League of Edmonton Electors	Donald Scott	11,337	SS	
Independent	David Graham	11,253		
Civic Reform Association	Harper McCrae	10,588		
Civic Reform Association	Alfred Forsythe	8,809	SS	
Civic Reform Association	Robert Boutillier	7,540		
League of Edmonton Electors	Norbert Berkowitz	6,624		
League of Edmonton Electors	Ernest Stokes	6,343		
Independent	John Lakusta	4,852		
League of Edmonton Electors	James Willford	4,134		
Independent	Paul Stepa	3,630		

=== Public school trustees ===
Party	Candidate	Votes		Elected
Civic Government Association	Eric Duggan	22,419	SS	✓
Civic Government Association	Vernon Johnson	18,061	SS	✓
Civic Reform Association	Edith Rogers	17,219		✓
Civic Government Association	P. William Jones	16,118	SS	✓
Better Education Association	Helen Sinclair	15,802		
Civic Government Association	A. E. Shelmerdine	15,072		
Better Education Association	D. Rae Sutherland	13,377	SS	
Better Education Association	William Harper	13,088	SS	
Better Education Association	Floyd Albin Johnson	11,678	SS	
Civic Reform Association	Paul Lloyd	6,775	SS	
Civic Reform Association	Anna Pollock	6,670	SS	
Civic Reform Association	Walter Kuhn	5,179	SS	

=== Separate (Catholic) school trustees ===
Party	Candidate	Votes		Elected
Independent	Joseph Moreau	6,878		✓
Separate Schools Voters Association	A. A. Gorman	6,446	SS	✓
Independent	Orest Demco	6,518		✓
Independent	Catherine McGrath	6,098		
Separate Schools Voters Association	J. J. Fitzgerald	5,734		
Independent	Harry Carrigan	5,251	SS	✓
Separate Schools Voters Association	J. W. Ensch	4,292	SS	
Independent	George Lynch-Staunton	4,022	SS	

=== Plebiscites ===
==== Fluoridation of Water ====
Shall fluorides, for the prevention of tooth decay, be added to the City water supply sufficient to bring the fluorine content of City water up to a level of one part fluorine to one million parts of water?

- Yes - 35508
- **No** - 22107

==== Paving ====
Shall Council pass bylaw No. 2216 creating a debenture debt in the sum of $500,000.00 for the estimated City share of standard paving of main arterial roads in the City?

- **Yes** - 25317
- No - 9476

==== Asphalt on Gravel Streets ====
Shall Council pass bylaw No. 2217 creating a debenture debt in the sum of $500,000.00 for the estimated City share of the cost of constructing asphalt surface roads on a gravel base on residential and arterial streets within the City?

- **Yes** - 25219
- No - 9130

==== Traffic Lights and Fire Alarm Equipment ====
Shall Council pass bylaw No. 2218 creating a debenture debt in the sum of $217,000.00 in order to purchase and locate additional traffic lights, and school and crosswalk lights, and additional fire alarm equipment?

- **Yes** - 26752
- No - 7988

==== Library ====
Shall Council pass bylaw No. 2219 creating a debenture debt in the sum of $125,000.00 to construct and equip a branch library in Edmonton capable of serving 30,000 people and 15 schools?

- Yes - 21434
- **No** - 12983

==== Fire Station ====
Shall Council pass bylaw No. 2224 creating a debenture debt in the sum of $72,000.00 in order to purchase fire equipment for a District Fire Station?

- **Yes** - 23761
- No - 9947
