= 1952 Edmonton municipal election =

Municipal election in Alberta, Canada

The 1952 municipal election was held October 15, 1952 to elect five aldermen to sit on Edmonton City Council and three trustees to sit on the separate school board, while three trustees were acclaimed to the public board. There was no election for mayor, as William Hawrelak was halfway through his two-year term. The electorate also decided four plebiscite questions.

There were ten aldermen on city council, but five of the positions were already filled: Harold Tanner (SS), Abe Miller, Rupert Clare, Violet Field, and Al Larson (SS) were all elected to two-year terms in 1951 and were still in office.

There were seven trustees on the public school board, but four of the positions were already filled: William Webber, Mary Butterworth (SS), J W K Shortreed, and John Thorogood (SS) had been acclaimed to two-year terms in 1951ṣ and were still in office. The same was true on the separate board, where Andre Dechene, William Sereda, Catherine McGrath, and Amby Lenon (SS) were continuing.

This was the first election to be held the third Wednesday in October instead of the first Wednesday in November, as had previously been the rule. It was also the first election in which there were more than one hundred thousand eligible voters.

== Voter turnout ==
There were 12,800 ballots cast out of 101,521 eligible voters, for a voter turnout of 12.6%.

== Results ==
- bold or ✓ indicates elected
- italics indicate incumbent
- "SS", where data is available, indicates representative for Edmonton's South Side, with a minimum South Side representation instituted after the city of Strathcona, south of the North Saskatchewan River, amalgamated into Edmonton on February 1, 1912.

=== Aldermen ===
| Party | Candidate | Votes | | Elected |
|---|---|---|---|---|
| Citizens' Committee | Edwin Clarke | 10,617 | | ✓ |
| Citizens' Committee | Richmond Francis Hanna | 10,532 | SS | ✓ |
| Citizens' Committee | Frederick John Mitchell | 9,502 | | ✓ |
| Citizens' Committee | James C MacDonald | 9,200 | | ✓ |
| Citizens' Committee | Ethel Wilson | 7,039 | | ✓ |
| Independent | Thomas Andrew Graham | 6,153 | | |
| Independent | Mack Lyle | 5,567 | SS | |
| Independent Labour | Carl Berg | 4,563 | | |

=== Public school trustees ===
| Party | Candidate | Votes | Elected |
|---|---|---|---|
| Citizens' Committee | Charles Cummins | Acclaimed | ✓ |
| Citizens' Committee | Robert Rae | Acclaimed | ✓ |
| Citizens' Committee | Harry Fowler | Acclaimed | ✓ |

=== Separate (Catholic) school trustees ===
| Party | Candidate | Votes | | Elected |
|---|---|---|---|---|
| Independent | Francis Killeen | 1,339 | | ✓ |
| Independent | James O'Hara | 1,310 | | ✓ |
| Independent | Joseph Pilon | 1,306 | | |
| Independent | Adrian Crowe | 1,170 | SS | ✓ |
| Independent | William Ditto | 855 | SS | |

Under the minimum South Side representation rule, Crowe was elected over Pilon.

=== Plebiscites ===
- Financial plebiscite items required a minimum two-thirds "Yes" majority to bring about action

==== Paving ====
Shall Council pass a bylaw creating a debenture debt in the sum of $1,250,000 for the City's share of paving residential and arterial streets?

- Yes - 7,645
- No - 1,185

==== Engineering Equipment ====
Shall Council pass a bylaw creating a debenture debt in the sum of $175,000 to purchase Engineers Department equipment consisting of road graders, street flushers, street sweepers and earthmovers??

- Yes - 7,446
- No - 1,288

==== Incinerator ====
Shall Council pass a bylaw creating a debenture debt in the sum of $550,000 in order to undertake the construction of a new Incinerator Building and the necessary furnaces for garbage and refuse disposal?

- Yes - 7,363
- No - 1,363

==== Royal Alexandra Hospital Maternity Wing ====
Shall Council pass a bylaw creating a debenture debt in the sum of $825,000 in order to finish building and to equip and furnish the maternity wing of the Royal Alexandra Hospital?

- Yes - 7,363
- No - 1,363
