= 1958 Edmonton municipal election =

Edmonton municipal election

The 1958 municipal election was held October 15, 1958 to elect six aldermen to sit on Edmonton City Council, four trustees to sit on the separate school board, and three trustees to sit on the public school board. There was no election for mayor, as William Hawrelak was one year into a two-year term.

There were ten aldermen on city council, but four of the positions were already filled: Cliffard Roy, William Connelly, Hu Harries, and Reginald Easton were all elected to two-year terms in 1957 and were still in office. James Falconer was also elected to a two-year term in 1957, but had resigned; accordingly, William Henning was elected to a one-year term to complete Falconer's term. Southside (SS) representation was guaranteed - two councillors had to come from the southside. This requirement was dropped in 1961.

There were seven trustees on the public school board, but four of the positions were already filled: Ernest Hanna, Angus MacDonald, Robert Johnson, and Douglas Thomson were elected to two-year terms in 1957 and were still in office. On the separate board, there were four vacancies: Orest Demco, Catherine McGrath, and Joseph Moreau were acclaimed to two-year terms in 1957 and were still in office. Michael O'Byrne had also been acclaimed to a two-year term in 1957, but had resigned; accordingly, William Burke was elected to a one-year term to complete O'Byrne's term.

== Voter turnout ==
There were 18650 ballots cast out of 145701 eligible voters, for a voter turnout of 12.8%.

== Results ==
(bold indicates elected, italics indicate incumbent)

=== Aldermen ===
Party	Candidate	Votes		Elected
Citizens' Committee	Frederick John Mitchell	13,263		✓
Citizens' Committee	George Prudham	12,230	SS	✓
Citizens' Committee	Donald Bowen	12,110	SS	✓
Citizens' Committee	Ethel Wilson	12,103		✓
Independent	Laurette Douglas	10,848		✓
Citizens' Committee	William Henning	10,710	SS	✓
Independent	Charles Simmonds	6,839	SS	
Independent	Orval Allen	5,672	SS	
Edmonton Voters Association	Julia Kiniski	4,283		
Edmonton Voters Association	Harper McCrae	4,036		
Edmonton Voters Association	Louis Broten	3,090		
Edmonton Voters Association	William Chmiliar	2,805	SS	
Edmonton Voters Association	Peter Uganecz	2,061		
Edmonton Voters Association	Stephen Senio	1,861	SS	

=== Public school trustees ===
Party	Candidate	Votes	Elected
Citizens' Committee	J. Percy Page	13,518	✓
Citizens' Committee	Robert Thorogood	12,119	✓
Citizens' Committee	William Orobko	9,745	✓
Edmonton Voters Association	David Graham	7,462	
Edmonton Voters Association	J. Franchuk	2,530	

=== Separate (Catholic) school trustees ===
- **Leo Lemieux** - 2626
- **Vincent Dantzer** - 2254
- **E D Stack** - 2141
- **William Burke** - 1789
- Paul Norris - 1531
- Terance Hughes - 1445
- William Vetsch - 1239
- William Belous - 933
- Walter Sievers - 839
