= 1954 Edmonton municipal election =

Municipal election in Alberta, Canada

The 1954 municipal election was held October 13, 1954 to elect five aldermen to sit on Edmonton City Council and three trustees each to sit on the public and separate school boards. The electorate also decided seven plebiscite questions. No election was held for mayor, as William Hawrelak was one year into a two-year term.

There were ten aldermen on city council, but five of the positions were already filled: Harold Tanner (SS), Rupert Clare, Abe Miller, Charles Simmonds, and Cliffard Roy (SS) were all elected to two-year terms in 1953 and were still in office.

There were seven trustees on the public school board, but four of the positions were already filled: Mary Butterworth (ss), William Cowley, James Falconer, and John Thorogood (SS) had been acclaimed to two-year terms in 1953 and were still in office. The same was true on the separate board, where Andre Dechene, Amby Lenon (SS), Catherine McGrath, and William Sereda were continuing.

== Voter turnout ==
There were 20,866 ballots cast out of 123,040 eligible voters, for a voter turnout of 17.0%.

== Results ==
- bold or ✓ indicates elected
- italics indicate incumbent
- "SS", where data is available, indicates representative for Edmonton's South Side, with a minimum South Side representation instituted after the city of Strathcona, south of the North Saskatchewan River, amalgamated into Edmonton on February 1, 1912.

=== Aldermen ===
| Party | Candidate | Votes | | Elected |
|---|---|---|---|---|
| Citizens' Committee | Edwin Clarke | 14,258 | | ✓ |
| Citizens' Committee | Ethel Wilson | 10,774 | | ✓ |
| Independent | Frederick John Mitchell | 10,764 | | ✓ |
| Independent | Giffard Main | 9,607 | SS | ✓ |
| Citizens' Committee | Laurette Douglas | 9,362 | | ✓ |
| Independent | Duncan Innes | 7,907 | SS | |
| Independent | L. B. Nicholson | 6,354 | SS | |
| Independent | Thomas Graham | 5,724 | | |
| Independent | Clifford Lee | 5,686 | SS | |
| Independent | Frank Cowles | 4,554 | SS | |
| Independent | Sidney Bowcott | 4,409 | | |
| Citizens' Committee | Roy Jamha | 2,749 | | |
| Independent | Tempest Aitken | 2,507 | SS | |
| Citizens' Committee | Alex Goruk | 2,444 | | |
| Independent | Herbert Turner | 2,187 | | |
| Independent | Julia Kiniski | 1,758 | | |
| Civic Reform Committee | Rose Sarman | 946 | SS | |
| Civic Reform Committee | William Tuomi | 707 | | |

=== Public school trustees ===
| Party | Candidate | Votes | Elected |
|---|---|---|---|
| Citizens' Committee | William Roberts | 12,723 | ✓ |
| Independent | Donald Bowen | 11,828 | ✓ |
| Citizens' Committee | Rex Stevenson | 10,529 | ✓ |
| Citizens' Committee | Henry Peterson | 5,122 | |
| Civic Reform Committee | Rebecca Stilwell | 4,989 | |
| Independent | Delmer Dreger | 3,414 | |

=== Separate (Catholic) school trustees ===
| Party | Candidate | Votes | | Elected |
|---|---|---|---|---|
| Independent | James O'Hara | 2,867 | | ✓ |
| Independent | Adrian Crowe | 2,575 | SS | ✓ |
| Independent | John Kane | 2,526 | | ✓ |
| Independent | Louis Blain | n/a | | |
| Independent | Marcel Lambert | 2,514 | | |
| Independent | Napolean Forcade | 1,554 | | |

=== Plebiscites ===
- Financial plebiscite items required a minimum two-thirds "Yes" majority to bring about action

==== Paving ====
Shall Council pass a bylaw creating a debenture debt in the sum of $550,000 for the City share of standard paving of arterial and residential streets?

- Yes - 10,749
- No - 1,670

==== Asphalt Surfacing I ====
Shall Council pass a bylaw creating a debenture debt in the sum of $450,000 for the City share of paving means of asphalt surfacing on gravel?

- Yes - 9,809
- No - 2,004

==== Asphalt Surfacing II ====
Shall Council pass a bylaw creating a debenture debt in the sum of $150,000 for the City share of paving by means of asphalt surfacing on gravel?

- Yes - 9,345
- No - 2,097

==== Parks ====
Shall Council pass a bylaw creating a debenture debt in the sum of $100,000 for the rehabilitation and development of parks including new trees, new roads, sewers, drains, fences and general rebuilding?

- Yes - 9,859
- No - 2,112

==== Neighbourhood Beautification ====
Shall Council pass a bylaw creating a debenture debt in the sum of $91,500 for the completion of neighborhood beautification areas in various parts of the City including the beautification of small parcels of land owned within the City?

- Yes - 8,808
- No - 2,898

==== Playgrounds ====
Shall Council pass a bylaw creating a debenture debt in the sum of $61,000 for the improvement of playgrounds and the construction of playground shelters and wading pools and the erection of fencing at various City playgrounds?

- Yes - 10,623
- No - 1,677

==== Health Clinic ====
Shall Council pass a bylaw creating a debenture debt in the sum of $60,000 for the purpose of a health clinic to look after inoculations, also the supervision of babies and pre-school children and preventative dental services?

- Yes - 10,623
- No - 1,677
