= 1963 Edmonton municipal election =

Canadian election

The 1963 municipal election was held October 16, 1963 to elect a mayor and six aldermen to sit on Edmonton City Council and four trustees to sit on each of the public and separate school boards. The electorate also decided three plebiscite questions.

There were ten aldermen on city council, but four of the positions were already filled: Frederick John Mitchell, Ethel Wilson, Morris Weinlos, and Vincent Dantzer were all elected to two-year terms in 1962 and were still in office. George Prudham was also elected to a two-year term in 1961, but resigned. Six were elected in this election, all to one-year terms.

All elected officials were elected to one-year terms in this election, in preparation for the changeover to a new system, whereby elections would be held only every two years with all officials elected to two-year terms.

There were seven trustees on the public school board, but three of the positions were already filled: James Falconer, Milton Lazerte, and Helen Sinclair were elected to two-year terms in 1962 and were still in office. Four were elected in this election through Plurality block voting.

The same was true on the separate board, where Edward Stack, Jean McDonald, and Bill Diachuk were continuing. Four were elected in this election through Plurality block voting.

In addition to choosing members for City Council, citizens were asked to vote on three plebiscites. Two of the plebiscites were related, asking if the city should borrow money to purchase a four city block parcel of land in downtown Edmonton, and if the city should borrow money to build a sports and convention complex on that land. These two plebiscites were rejected. The site under consideration, on the north side of Jasper Avenue, is now occupied by the Citadel Theatre (opened 1976), Sun Life Place (1978), and Canada Place (1988). The eventual (1983) scaled down Edmonton Convention Centre was built a few metres south of the 1963 proposal site, on the cliff side of Jasper Avenue.

Citizens did agree to a sports/convention centre in a 1968 plebiscite, but later rejected the specific 1970 Omniplex project plebiscite. The similar-looking Commonwealth Stadium was built a few years later.

== Voter turnout ==
There were 98052 ballots cast out of 173901 eligible voters, for a voter turnout of 56.4%.

== Results ==
(bold indicates elected, italics indicate incumbent)

=== Mayor ===
| Party | Candidate | Votes | % |
|---|---|---|---|
| Independent | William Hawrelak | 52,340 | 53.80% |
| Civic Government Association | Stanley Milner | 44,950 | 46.20% |

=== Aldermen ===
| Party | Candidate | Votes | Elected |
|---|---|---|---|
| Civic Government Association | McKim Ross | 53,516 | ✓ |
| Civic Government Association | John Leslie Bodie | 43,186 | ✓ |
| Civic Government Association | Gordon McClary | 41,248 | ✓ |
| United Voters Association | Ivor Dent | 41,044 | ✓ |
| United Voters Association | Julia Kiniski | 36,861 | ✓ |
| Citizens Council | Ed Leger | 35,927 | ✓ |
| Civic Government Association | Murray Hamilton | 35,725 | |
| Civic Government Association | Robert Brower | 33,408 | |
| United Voters Association | Allan Welsh | 30,611 | |
| Civic Government Association | Fred Kurylo | 28,654 | |
| United Voters Association | Norbert Berkowitz | 26,246 | |
| United Voters Association | Kenneth McAuley | 26,153 | |
| United Voters Association | R. J. Dunseith | 20,819 | |
| Independent | John Sehn | 14,369 | |

=== Public School Trustees ===
| Party | Candidate | Votes | Elected |
|---|---|---|---|
| Better Education Association | Earl Buxton | 33,699 | ✓ |
| Better Education Association | Walter Gainer | 32,735 | ✓ |
| Quality Education Council | Edith Rogers | 32,666 | ✓ |
| Civic Government Association | Vernon Johnson | 25,366 | ✓ |
| Civic Government Association | P. William Jones | 24,538 | |
| Better Education Association | Herbert Meltzer | 21,560 | |
| Better Education Association | John Bracco | 21,334 | |
| Civic Government Association | Bruce Mathew | 19,179 | |
| Quality Education Council | Lee Fosmark | 11,741 | |
| Quality Education Council | Arnold Rapske | 11,015 | |
| Quality Education Council | George Edward Machon | 8,357 | |

=== Separate (Catholic) School Trustees ===
| Party | Candidate | Votes | Elected |
|---|---|---|---|
| Independent | Orest Demco | **11,581** | ✓ |
| Independent | A. A. Gorman | **9,441** | ✓ |
| Independent | G. R. Boileau | **9,689** | ✓ |
| Independent | B. Feehan | **9,147** | ✓ |
| Independent | John Barbeau | 8,506 | |
| Independent | Roy Watson | 6,103 | |
| Independent | Harry Carrigan | 6,020 | |
| Independent | William Betzler | 5,586 | |

=== Plebiscites ===
- Plebiscite items required a minimum two-thirds "Yes" majority to bring about action

==== Land Exchange ====
Are you in favour of the disposition, by exchange, of approximately 1.23 acres of land lying East of Bellamy Hill, approximately .43 acres of which is now designated as Parkland, for approximately 215 acres of land lying in the Southwest section of the City in an area West of Whitemud Creek? The purpose of the exchange is to enable the purchaser to construct a commercial building on the Bellamy Hill site. If the exchange is accepted, the land acquired by the City will be Parkland?

- **Yes**
- No
–
–
63,344
26,421

==== Convention Complex Land Acquisition ====
Shall Council pass bylaw No. 2454 to borrow by debentures $4,000,000.00 with which to buy the land and buildings between Jasper Avenue and 102nd Avenue and between 97th Street and 99th Street so that a convention centre, an arena for sporting and cultural events and exhibitions, a theatre building, tourist centre and parking garage can be built there as part of the City Centre Development Plan?

- Yes
- **No**
–
–
33,470
25,300

==== Convention Complex ====
Shall Council pass bylaw No. 2455 to borrow by debentures $10,250,000.00 to construct a convention centre, an arena for sporting and cultural events and exhibitions, a theatre building, tourist centre and parking garage?

- Yes
- **No**
–
–
30,903
25,457
