= 1960 Edmonton municipal election =

Municipal election in Alberta, Canada

The 1960 Edmonton municipal election was held October 19, 1960, in Edmonton, Alberta, Canada, to elect five aldermen to sit on Edmonton City Council and three trustees to sit on each of the public and separate school boards. The electorate also decided eight plebiscite questions.

There were ten aldermen on city council, but five of the positions were already filled: William Henning, Angus McGugan, Ed Leger, Gordon McClary, and McKim Ross were all elected to two-year terms in 1959 and were still in office.

There were seven trustees on the public school board, but four of the positions were already filled: Angus MacDonald, Edith Rogers, Vernon Johnson, and Douglas Thomson were elected to two-year terms in 1959 and were still in office. The same was true on the separate board, where Joseph Moreau, Orest Demco, Catherine McGrath, and Henry Carrigan were continuing.

== Voter turnout ==
There were 26,009 ballots cast out of 158,771 eligible voters, for a voter turnout of 16.4%.

== Results ==
(bold indicates elected, italics indicate incumbent)

=== Aldermen ===
Each voter could cast up to five votes. Voting was at-large so each voter could vote for any candidate in the running. The most popular candidates of two different parties were elected; the least popular were not.

The elected council represented a variety of interests. Candidates belonging two different parties - Civic Government Association and Civic Reform Association - were elected. But smaller voting blocks were denied representation. Ivor Dent of the CCF (soon to be the NDP) was denied a seat although getting a vote from more than a third of the voters.

Three of the five successful candidates got a vote from a majority of voters across the city.

Party	Candidate	Votes	Elected
Civic Government Association	Frederick John Mitchell	13,836	✓
Civic Reform Association	George Prudham	13,258	✓
Civic Government Association	Morris Weinlos	13,105	✓
Civic Government Association	Ethel Wilson	10,969	✓
Civic Reform Association	Milton Lazerte	10,847	✓
Independent	Laurette Douglas	10,763	
Civic Reform Association	C. H. Clarke	9,454	
Independent	Ivor Dent	9,265	
Civic Government Association	Stanley Milner	8,659	
Civic Reform Association	Ian MacDonald Nicoll	8,553	
Civic Government Association	Sidney Wrigglesworth	5,756	
Independent	Edgar Gerhart	5,581	
Civic Reform Association	Rex Martin	5,540	
Independent	E. J. (Slim) Powell	2,876	
Independent	Paul Stepa	2,059	

=== Public school trustees ===
Party	Candidate	Votes	Elected
Better Education Association & Civic Reform Association	Warren Edward (Ted) Smith	11,833	✓
Better Education Association	John Andrews	11,729	✓
Better Education Association	Shirley Forbes	9,832	✓
Civic Government Association	James Falconer	6,680	
Civic Government Association	John Thorogood	6,619	
Civic Reform Association	John McIntosh Hope	6,074	
Civic Government Association	Murray Cooke	5,427	
Civic Reform Association	William Hackett	4,140	
Independent	David Graham	2,790	

=== Separate (Catholic) school trustees ===
Party	Candidate	Votes	Elected
Independent	Leo Lemieux	3,845	✓
Independent	Edward Stack	3,211	✓
Independent	John Barbeau	3,195	✓
Independent	Vincent Dantzer	3,133	

=== Plebiscites ===
==== At-Large Elections ====
Are you in favour of changing the Election System for Alderman and Public School Board Members so that all such elected representatives are elected from the City at large without regard to whether they live North or South of the North Saskatchewan River or own fifty percent of their property North or South of this river?

- Yes - 17204
- **No** - 9668

==== Paving ====
Shall Council pass a bylaw creating a debenture debt in the sum of $450,000.00 for the City share of standard paving of arterial and residential streets?

- **Yes** - 14728
- No - 4489

==== Asphalt on Existing Gravel Streets ====
Shall Council pass a bylaw creating a debenture debt in the sum of $250,000.00 for the City share of asphalt paving on existing gravel arterial and residential streets?

- **Yes** - 14501
- No - 4471

==== Asphalt on New Gravel Streets ====
Shall Council pass a bylaw creating a debenture debt in the sum of $500,000.00 for the City share of asphalt paving on new gravel arterial and residential streets?

- **Yes** - 13241
- No - 5338

==== Traffic Lights ====
Shall Council pass a bylaw creating a debenture debt in the sum of $180,000.00 in order to purchase and locate traffic lights on certain highway intersections within the City?

- **Yes** - 15812
- No - 3554

==== Parks ====
Shall Council pass a bylaw creating a debenture debt in the sum of $600,000.00 for the purpose of constructing and improving parks and playgrounds?

- **Yes** - 14455
- No - 4829

==== Bridge ====
Shall Council pass a bylaw creating a debenture debt in the sum of $500,000.00 for the purpose of constructing a district bridge as part of the City's overall arterial road system?

- **Yes** - 15043
- No - 4454

==== Library ====
Shall Council pass a bylaw creating a debenture debt in the sum of $165,000.00 for the purpose of constructing a district library?

- Yes - 12173
- **No** - 6756
