= 1956 Edmonton municipal election =

Municipal election in Alberta, Canada

The 1956 municipal election was held October 17, 1956 to elect five aldermen to sit on Edmonton City Council and three trustees to sit on each of the public and separate school boards. The electorate also decided nine plebiscite questions. There was no election for mayor, as William Hawrelak was one year into a two-year term.

There were ten aldermen on city council, but five of the positions were already filled: Abe Miller, Cliffard Roy, Hu Harries, James Falconer, and William Connelly were all elected to two-year terms in 1955 and were still in office.

There were seven trustees on the public school board, but four of the positions were already filled: Mary Butterworth, Herbert Smith, James Hanna, and William Henning were elected to two-year terms in 1955 and were still in office. The same was true on the separate board, where Amby Lenon, Andre Dechene, Orest Demco, and Catherine McGrath were continuing.

== Voter turnout ==
There were 13360 ballots cast out of 133537 eligible voters, for a voter turnout of 10.0%.

== Results ==
(bold indicates elected, italics indicate incumbent)

=== Aldermen ===
Party	Candidate	Votes		Elected
Citizens' Committee	Frederick John Mitchell	9,984		✓
Citizens' Committee	Ethel Wilson	9,284		✓
Citizens' Committee	Laurette Douglas	9,233		✓
Citizens' Committee	Giffard Main	8,838	SS	✓
Citizens' Committee	Donald Bowen	8,774	SS	✓
Labour	David Graham	6,424		
Labour	Charles Gilbert	5,560	SS	
Independent	Tempest Aitken	4,329	SS	
Independent	Julia Kiniski	3,999		

=== Public school trustees ===
Party	Candidate	Votes	Elected
Citizens' Committee	John Page	10,354	✓
Citizens' Committee	John Thorogood	8,942	✓
Citizens' Committee	William Orobko	7,220	✓
Independent	Rebecca Stillwell	5,882	

=== Separate (Catholic) school trustees ===
Party	Candidate	Votes		Elected
Independent	Vincent Dantzer	2,068		✓
Independent	John Bernard Kane	1,846		✓
Independent	Leo Lemieux	1,813	SS	✓
Independent	James O'Hara	1,739		

=== Plebiscites ===
==== Paving ====
Shall Council pass a bylaw creating a debenture debt in the sum of $1,000,000.00 for the City's share of standard paving on arterial and residential streets?

- **Yes** - 8673
- No - 1193

==== Paving and Gravelling ====
Details of question no longer available.

- **Yes** - 8483
- No - 1197

==== Asphalt and Gravel ====
Details of question no longer available.

- **Yes** - 8023
- No - 1494

==== Parks ====
Shall Council pass a bylaw creating a debenture debt in the sum of $500,000.00 for the improvement of City parks, and the commencement of work on undeveloped parkland, circles, buffer zones, ravine side boulevards and similar works, including, necessary new roads, sewers and drains into parkland?

- **Yes** - 8246
- No - 1444

==== Health Clinic ====
Shall Council pass a bylaw creating a debenture debt in the sum of $60,000.00 for the purpose of a health clinic to provide inoculation services, supervision of babies and pre-school children and preventative dental services?

- **Yes** - 8755
- No - 1178

==== Royal Alexandra Hospital ====
Shall Council pass a bylaw creating a debenture debt in the sum of $350,000.00 to provide equipment and furnishings at the Royal Alexandra Hospital, miscellaneous improvements to the interior and exterior of the Hospital?

- **Yes** - 7213
- No - 2433

==== Traffic Lights ====
Shall Council pass a bylaw creating a debenture debt in the sum of $150,000.00 in order to purchase and install additional traffic lights at various locations within the City?

- **Yes** - 7987
- No - 1607

==== Fire Hall ====
Shall Council pass a bylaw creating a debenture debt in the sum of $125,000.00 for the purpose of constructing a fire hall in the vicinity of 97th Street and 127th Avenue?

- **Yes** - 7645
- No - 1741

==== Royal Alexandra Hospital - Nurses Residence ====
Shall Council pass a bylaw creating a debenture debt in the sum of $2,700,000.00 for the purpose of constructing at the Royal Alexandra Hospital nurses residence and training school?

- **Yes** - 6921
- No - 2695
