= 1955 Edmonton municipal election =

Municipal election in Alberta, Canada

The 1955 municipal election was held October 19, 1955, to elect five aldermen to sit on Edmonton City Council and six trustees to sit on the public school board, while the mayor and four trustees for the separate school board were acclaimed. The electorate also decided ten plebiscite questions.

There were ten aldermen on city council, but five of the positions were already filled: Edwin Clarke, Frederick John Mitchell, Ethel Wilson, Laurette Douglas, and Giffard Main (SS) were all elected to two-year terms in 1954 and were still in office.

There were seven trustees on the public school board, but one of the positions were already filled, as Donald Bowen was elected to a two-year term in 1954 and was still in office. William Roberts and Rex Stevenson had also been elected to two-year terms in 1954, but had resigned; accordingly, John Thorogood (SS) and Herbert Turner were elected to one-year terms. On the separate board, there were four vacancies, as James O'Hara, Adrian Crowe (SS), and John Kane were continuing.

== Voter turnout ==
There were 14,248 ballots cast out of 126,990 eligible voters, for a voter turnout of 11.2%.

== Results ==
- bold or ✓ indicates elected
- italics indicate incumbent
- "SS", where data is available, indicates representative for Edmonton's South Side, with a minimum South Side representation instituted after the city of Strathcona, south of the North Saskatchewan River, amalgamated into Edmonton on February 1, 1912.

=== Mayor ===
Party	Candidate	Votes
Citizens' Committee	William Hawrelak	Acclaimed

=== Aldermen ===
Party	Candidate	Votes		Elected
Citizens' Committee	Abe Miller	11,773		✓
Citizens' Committee	Cliffard Roy	11,539	SS	✓
Citizens' Committee	Hu Harries	10,343	SS	✓
Citizens' Committee	James Falconer	10,207		✓
Citizens' Committee	William Connelly	9,679		✓
Independent	Charles Simmonds	8,467	SS	
Independent	Tempest Aitken	5,945	SS	
Independent	George Solomon	3,289		

=== Public school trustees ===
Party	Candidate	Votes		Elected
Citizens' Committee	Mary Butterworth	10,639	SS	✓
Citizens' Committee	Herbert Smith	10,240	SS	✓
Citizens' Committee	James Hanna	9,290		✓
Citizens' Committee	William Henning	8,982	SS	✓
Citizens' Committee	John Thorogood	8,907	SS	✓
Citizens' Committee	Herbert Turner	7,352		✓
Independent	Louis Broten	3,713		
Independent	David Graham	6,562		
Independent	Laura Tuomi	3,167		

=== Separate (Catholic) school trustees ===
Party	Candidate	Votes		Elected
Independent	Amby Lenon	Acclaimed	SS	✓
Independent	Andre Dechene	Acclaimed		✓
Independent	Orest Demco	Acclaimed		✓
Independent	Catherine McGrath	Acclaimed		✓

=== Plebiscites ===
- Financial plebiscite items required a minimum two-thirds "Yes" majority to bring about action

==== Paving ====
Shall Council pass a bylaw creating a debenture debt in the sum of $320,000 for the City share of standard paving of arterial and residential streets?

- Yes - 9,764
- No - 1,072

==== Asphalt Surfacing I ====
Shall Council pass a bylaw creating a debenture debt in the sum of $300,000 for the City share of asphalt surfacing on gravel for existing gravelled roads?

- Yes - 9,490
- No - 1,136

==== Asphalt Surfacing II ====
Shall Council pass a bylaw creating a debenture debt in the sum of $400,000 for the City share of asphalt surfacing on gravel for new roads at various locations within the City?

- Yes - 8,930
- No - 1,427

==== Bridge ====
Shall Council pass a bylaw creating a debenture debt in the sum of $2,000,000 for the construction of a bridge in concrete or steel or a combination of both, across the North Saskatchewan River at such location within the city as, in the opinion of Council, will most quickly and effectively improve the cross river traffic conditions, together with provision for approaches thereto including acquirements of all necessary lands?

- Yes - 7,884
- No - 3,030

==== Zoo ====
Shall Council pass a bylaw creating a debenture debt in the sum of $400,000 for the establishment and development in Laurier Park of a Zoo including provisions for sewer, water, roads, buildings, structures, animals, and necessary equipment?

- Yes - 8,699
- No - 2,184

==== Miscellaneous Neighbourhood Improvements ====
Shall Council pass a bylaw creating a debenture debt in the sum of $250,000 for the establishment and improvement of neighborhood parks, traffic circles, buffer zones, ravine side boulevards and works of a similar nature, including where necessary new roads, sewers, drains, fences, and general re-building?

- Yes - 8,724
- No - 2,764

==== Library ====
Shall Council pass a bylaw creating a debenture debt in the sum of $75,000 for the establishment, improvement, extension of library facilities including construction of a new building?

- Yes - 7,418
- No - 2,764

==== Health Clinic ====
Shall Council pass a bylaw creating a debenture debt in the sum of $60,000 for the purpose of a health clinic to look after inoculations, also the supervision of babies and pre-school children and preventative dental services?

- Yes - 9,419
- No - 1,251

==== Royal Alexandra Hospital (New Building) ====
Shall Council pass a bylaw creating a debenture debt in the sum of $700,000 to complete and furnish a new building at the Royal Alexandra Hospital containing kitchen, dining and other facilities, also additional facilities for nurses living quarters and nurses study and recreation facilities?

- Yes - 7,704
- No - 2,851

==== Swimming Pool ====
Shall Council pass a bylaw creating a debenture debt in the sum of $250,000 for the construction of an indoor swimming pool in the City south of the North Saskatchewan River at a location, which, in the opinion of Council, is most suitable and convenient for residents of Edmonton South?

- Yes - 6,997
- No - 3,477
