= 1950 Edmonton municipal election =

Municipal election in Alberta, Canada

The 1950 municipal election was held November 1, 1950 to elect five aldermen to sit on Edmonton City Council. The electorate also decided eleven plebiscite questions. There was no mayoral election, as Sidney Parsons was on the second year of a two year-term. There were no elections for school trustees, as candidates for both the public and separate school boards were acclaimed.

There were ten aldermen on city council, but five of the positions were already filled: Harold Tanner (SS), Armour Ford, Rupert Clare, Kenneth Lawson, and William Hawrelak (SS) were all elected to two-year terms in 1949 and were still in office.

There were seven trustees on the public school board, but four of the positions were already filled: George Brown, Mary Butterworth (SS), J W K Shortreed, and John Thorogood (SS) had been acclaimed to two-year terms in 1949 and were still in office. The same was true on the separate board, where Joseph Gallant, Lawrence Keylor (SS), Ambrose O'Neill, and Joseph Pilon were continuing.

== Voter turnout ==
There were 27,484 ballots cast out of 93,406 eligible voters, for a voter turnout of 29.4%.

== Results ==
- bold or ✓ indicates elected
- italics indicate incumbent
- "SS", where data is available, indicates representative for Edmonton's South Side, with a minimum South Side representation instituted after the city of Strathcona, south of the North Saskatchewan River, amalgamated into Edmonton on February 1, 1912.

=== Aldermen ===
Party	Candidate	Votes		Elected
Citizens' Committee	Edwin Clarke	17,421		✓
Citizens' Committee	Duncan Innes	16,279	SS	✓
Citizens' Committee	Richmond Francis Hanna	16,112		✓
Citizens' Committee	Frederick John Mitchell	15,307		✓
Independent	Athelstan Bissett	14,089	SS	✓
Independent	Sidney Bowcott	13,315		
Citizens' Committee	Carl Berg	12,891		
Independent	George Gleave	10,975		
Independent	Thomas Graham	7,123		
Independent	George Linney	5,789		
Independent	Charles Simmonds	5,640		
Independent	Frederick Speed	1,851		

=== Public school trustees ===
Harry Fowler, Robert Rae, and Charles Cummins were acclaimed.

=== Separate (Catholic) school trustees ===
Adrian Crowe (SS), Francis Killeen, and James O'Hara were acclaimed.

=== Plebiscites ===
- Financial plebiscite items required a minimum two-thirds "Yes" majority to bring about action

==== Civic Centre ====
Are you in favour of the City entering into the proposed agreement with the First New Amsterdam Corporation for development of the Civic Centre area as finally approved by City Council on September 29, 1950?

- Yes - 11,843
- No - 7,641

==== Paving ====
Shall Council pass a bylaw creating a debenture debt in the sum of $1,225,095.00 for City share of paving of arterial streets, bus routes and elsewhere?

- Yes - 16,442
- No - 1,478

==== High Level Bridge ====
Shall Council pass a bylaw creating a debenture debt in the sum of $500,000.00 to be applied toward the cost of providing a four lane vehicular traffic deck on the High Level Bridge to relieve serious traffic congestion?

- Yes - 9,174
- No - 8,588

==== Equipment for Engineers' Department ====
Shall Council pass a bylaw creating a debenture debt in the sum of $100,000.00 to purchase equipment for the Engineers’ Department including a flusher, a sweeper, mud pump and grader?

- Yes - 14,432
- No - 2,741

==== Fire Department ====
Shall Council pass a bylaw creating a debenture debt in the sum of $175,000.00 for the erection of Fire Department Buildings, namely, fire hall at Jasper Avenue and 92 Street, one drill tower and one drill school utility building for training firemen?

- Yes - 15,147
- No - 2,230

==== Fire Fighting Equipment ====
Shall Council pass a bylaw creating a debenture debt in the sum of $76,000.00 to purchase equipment for the Fire Department consisting of two pumpers and one aerial ladder?

- Yes - 15,971
- No - 1,499

==== Police Station ====
Shall Council pass a bylaw creating a debenture debt in the sum of $250,000.00 for additions to the main Police Station Building including one additional court room, increased office space, added prisoner cells and full sized gymnasium?

- Yes - 12,804
- No - 4,216

==== Renfrew Ball Park ====
Shall Council pass a bylaw creating a debenture debt in the sum of $50,000.00 to erect a concrete grandstand to seat 1,200 people at Renfrew Ball Park?

- Yes - 10,877
- No - 6,253

==== Royal Alexandra Maternity Ward ====
Shall Council pass a bylaw creating a debenture debt in the sum of $1,035,000.00 for the erection of new maternity building at the Royal Alexandra Hospital to relieve serious over-crowding of present facilities?

- Yes - 16,218
- No - 1,752

==== Royal Alexandra Hospital ====
Shall Council pass a bylaw creating a debenture debt in the sum of $1,200,000.00 for additions and renovations to Royal Alexandra Hospital including improved operating rooms, laboratories, X-ray Department, cafeteria, plus renovation of plumbing in present main building?

- Yes - 15,844
- No - 2,060

==== Outdoor Pool ====
Shall Council pass a bylaw creating a debenture debt in the sum of $150,000.00 for the construction of an out-door swimming pool in the City?

- Yes - 12,865
- No - 4,461
