= 1953 Edmonton municipal election =

Municipal election in Alberta, Canada

The 1953 municipal election was held October 14, 1953, to elect six aldermen to sit on Edmonton City Council and four trustees to sit on the separate school board, while the mayor and four trustees for the public school board were acclaimed. The electorate also decided five plebiscite questions.

There were ten aldermen on city council, but four of the positions were already filled: Edwin Clarke, James MacDonald, Frederick John Mitchell, and Ethel Wilson were all elected to two-year terms in 1952 and were still in office. Richmond Francis Hanna (SS) had also been elected to a two-year term in 1952, but had been elected to the House of Commons of Canada and had resigned; consequently, Hu Harries (SS) was elected alderman for a one-year term to complete his term.

There were seven trustees on the public school board, but three of the positions were already filled: Charles Cummins, Robert Rae, and Harry Fowler had been acclaimed to two-year terms in 1952 and were still in office. The same was true on the separate board, where Francis Killeen, James O'Hara, and Adrian Crowe (SS) were continuing.

== Voter turnout ==
There were 12,146 ballots cast out of 107,687 eligible voters, for a voter turnout of 11.2%.

== Results ==
- bold or ✓ indicates elected
- italics indicate incumbent
- "SS", where data is available, indicates representative for Edmonton's South Side, with a minimum South Side representation instituted after the city of Strathcona, south of the North Saskatchewan River, amalgamated into Edmonton on February 1, 1912.

=== Mayor ===
Party	Candidate	Votes
Citizens' Committee	William Hawrelak	Acclaimed

=== Aldermen ===
Party	Candidate	Votes		Elected
Citizens' Committee	Harold Tanner	11,267	SS	✓
Citizens' Committee	Rupert Clare	10,936		✓
Citizens' Committee	Abe Miller	9,845		✓
Citizens' Committee	Charles Simmonds	8,362		✓
Citizens' Committee	Cliffard Roy	8,334	SS	✓
Citizens' Committee	Hu Harries	7,889	SS	✓
Independent	Sidney Bowcott	7,395		
Independent	Phoebe McCullough	5,377		
Independent	Julia Kiniski	3,471		

=== Public school trustees ===
Party	Candidate	Votes		Elected
Citizens' Committee	Mary Butterworth	Acclaimed	SS	✓
Citizens' Committee	William Cowley	Acclaimed		✓
Citizens' Committee	James Falconer	Acclaimed		✓
Citizens' Committee	John Thorogood	Acclaimed	SS	✓

=== Separate (Catholic) school trustees ===
Party	Candidate	Votes		Elected
Independent	Andre Dechene	2,305		✓
Independent	William Sereda	1,869		✓
Independent	Amby Lenon	1,680	SS	✓
Independent	Catherine McGrath	1,662		✓
Independent	John Kane	1,401		

=== Plebiscites ===
- Financial plebiscite items required a minimum two-thirds "Yes" majority to bring about action

==== Paving ====
Shall Council pass a bylaw creating a debenture debt in the sum of $1,250,000 for the City share of paving arterial and residential streets?

- Yes - 8,271
- No - 757

==== Engineering Equipment ====
Shall Council pass a bylaw creating a debenture debt in the sum of $200,000 for the purpose of buying Engineers Department Equipment, consisting of scavenging equipment, oil distributor, front end loaders, oil and gas tenders, sweepers and other construction equipment?

- Yes - 7,720
- No - 1,090

==== Swimming Pool Renovations ====
Shall Council pass a bylaw creating a debenture debt in the sum of $75,000 for providing new filtration system and reconstructing dressing rooms and sun deck area in Borden Park Swimming Pool?

- Yes - 6,413
- No - 2,067

==== Playgrounds ====
Shall Council pass a bylaw creating a debenture debt in the sum of $50,000 to develop public playgrounds, playground shelters, wading pools and to provide other public recreation facilities?

- Yes - 7,410
- No - 1,270

==== New Building at the Royal Alexandra Hospital ====
Shall Council pass a bylaw creating a debenture debt in the sum of $355,000 being part of the cost of construction of a building to contain kitchen and dining room, storage and other facilities, at the Royal Alexandra Hospital?

- Yes - 7,299
- No - 1,439
