= 1951 Edmonton municipal election =

Municipal election in Alberta, Canada

The 1951 municipal election was held November 7, 1951 to elect a mayor and five aldermen to sit on Edmonton City Council and four trustees to sit on the separate school board, while four trustees were acclaimed to the public board. The electorate also decided four plebiscite questions.

There were ten aldermen on city council, but five of the positions were already filled: Edwin Clarke, Duncan Innes (SS), Richmond Francis Hanna, Frederick John Mitchell, and Athelstan Bissett (SS) were all elected to two-year terms in 1950 and were still in office.

There were seven trustees on the public school board, but three of the positions were already filled: Harry Fowler, Robert Rae, and Charles Cummins had been acclaimed to two-year terms in 1950 and were still in office. The same was true on the separate board, where Adrian Crowe (SS), Francis Killeen, and James O'Hara were continuing.

== Voter turnout ==
There were 41,515 ballots cast out of 98,882 eligible voters, for a voter turnout of 41.0%.

== Results ==
- bold or ✓ indicates elected
- italics indicate incumbent
- "SS", where data is available, indicates representative for Edmonton's South Side, with a minimum South Side representation instituted after the city of Strathcona, south of the North Saskatchewan River, amalgamated into Edmonton on February 1, 1912.

=== Mayor ===
Party	Candidate	Votes	%
Citizens' Committee	William Hawrelak	26,858	65.03%
Independent	Sidney Parsons	8,537	20.67%
Independent	George Gleave	5,909	14.31%

=== Aldermen ===
Party	Candidate	Votes		Elected
Citizens' Committee	Harold Tanner	27,067	SS	✓
Citizens' Committee	Abe Miller	22,035		✓
Citizens' Committee	Rupert Clare	21,565		✓
Citizens' Committee	Violet Field	21,061		✓
Citizens' Committee	Al Larson	16,648	SS	✓
Independent	Sidney Bowcott	12,332		
Independent	Thomas Andrew Graham	10,389		
Independent	Charles Simmonds	9,147		
Independent	Mack Lyle	8,827	SS	
Labour	Ethel Wilson	8,516		
Independent Labour	Tom Steele	7,126		
Labour	Daniel Smith	6,705		
Independent	Julia Kiniski	5,045		

=== Public school trustees ===
Party	Candidate	Votes		Elected
Citizens' Committee	William Webber	Acclaimed		✓
Citizens' Committee	Mary Butterworth	Acclaimed	SS	✓
Citizens' Committee	J. W. K. Shortreed	Acclaimed		✓
Citizens' Committee	John Thorogood	Acclaimed	SS	✓

=== Separate (Catholic) school trustees ===
Party	Candidate	Votes		Elected
Independent	Andre Dechene	3,832		✓
Independent	William Sereda	3,744		✓
Independent	Catherine McGrath	3,343		✓
Independent	Amby Lenon	3,008	SS	✓
Independent	Joseph Pilon	2,995		
Independent	Robert Garneau	2,705		
Independent	Terence Hughes	2,100		

=== Plebiscites ===
- Financial plebiscite items required a minimum two-thirds "Yes" majority to bring about action

==== Paving ====
Shall Council pass a bylaw creating a sinking fund debenture debt in the sum of $1,060,000 for the City share of paving of residential and arterial streets?

- Yes - 16,027
- No - 3,039

==== Incinerator Upgrades ====
Shall Council pass a bylaw creating a debenture debt in the sum of $300,000 for the purpose of modernization and enlarging the capacity of the present city incinerator?

- Yes - 13,827
- No - 4,217

==== Equipment for the City Engineers' Department ====
Shall Council pass a bylaw creating a debenture debt in the sum of $200,000 to purchase construction and scavenging equipment and traffic light equipment for the City Engineers’ Department?

- Yes - 15,072
- No - 3,248

==== Building Extensions ====
Shall Council pass a bylaw creating a debenture debt in the sum of $65,000 for extensions to Engineers’ yard and shop buildings?

- Yes - 10,794
- No - 6,553
