= 1948 Edmonton municipal election =

Municipal election in Alberta, Canada

The 1948 municipal election was held November 3, 1948 to elect five aldermen to sit on Edmonton City Council. There was no mayoral election, as Harry Ainlay was in the second year of a two-year term. There were no elections for school trustees, as candidates for both the public and separate boards were acclaimed.

There were ten aldermen on city council, but five of the positions were already filled: Armour Ford, Harold Tanner (SS), James McCrie Douglas (SS), Charles Gariepy, and George Gleave were all elected to two-year terms in 1947 and were still in office.

There were seven trustees on the public school board, but four of the positions were already filled: Mary Butterworth (SS), George Brown, Stewart Graham, and William Morrow (SS) had been elected to two-year terms in 1947 and were still in office. The same was true on the separate board, where Weldon Bateman (SS), Joseph Gallant, Thomas Malone, and Joseph Pilon were continuing.

== Voter turnout ==
There were 11,665 ballots cast out of 80,369 eligible voters, for a voter turnout of 14.5%.

== Results ==
- bold or ✓ indicates elected
- italics indicate incumbent
- "SS", where data is available, indicates representative for Edmonton's South Side, with a minimum South Side representation instituted after the city of Strathcona, south of the North Saskatchewan River, amalgamated into Edmonton on February 1, 1912.

=== Aldermen ===
| Party | Candidate | Votes | | Elected |
|---|---|---|---|---|
| Citizens' Committee | Sidney Parsons | 7,533 | | ✓ |
| Citizens' Committee | Frederick John Mitchell | 7,514 | | ✓ |
| Independent | Sidney Bowcott | 6,313 | | ✓ |
| Independent | Athelstan Bissett | 6,189 | SS | ✓ |
| Citizens' Committee | Richmond Francis Hanna | 5,729 | | ✓ |
| Citizens' Committee | W. E. Briggs | 5,647 | | |
| Citizens' Committee | William Hawrelak | 4,209 | SS | |
| Independent | Percy Gwynne | 4,100 | | |
| Independent | Reta Rowan | 2,422 | | |
| Independent | Julia Kiniski | 1,783 | | |
| Independent | William Chmiliar | 1,723 | | |
| Independent | Frederick Speed | 928 | | |

=== Public school trustees ===
Harry Fowler, James MacDonald, and Robert Rae were acclaimed.

=== Separate (Catholic) school trustees ===
Adrian Crowe (SS), Joseph O'Hara, and Francis Killeen were acclaimed.
