= 1949 Edmonton municipal election =

Municipal election in Alberta, Canada

The 1949 municipal election was held November 2, 1949 to elect a mayor and six aldermen to sit on Edmonton City Council. The electorate also decided eight plebiscite questions. There were no elections for school trustees, as candidates for both the public and separate boards were acclaimed.

There were ten aldermen on city council, but four of the positions were already filled: Frederick John Mitchell, Sidney Bowcott, Athelstan Bissett (SS), and Richmond Francis Hanna were all elected to two-year terms in 1948 and were still in office. Sidney Parsons was also elected in 1948 to a two-year term, but he resigned in order to run for mayor; accordingly, Edwin Clarke was elected to a one-year term.

There were seven trustees on the public school board, but three of the positions were already filled: Harry Fowler, James MacDonald, and Robert Rae had been acclaimed to two-year terms in 1948 and were still in office. The same was true on the separate board, where Adrian Crowe (SS), Joseph O'Hara, and Francis Killeen were continuing.

== Voter turnout ==
There were 26,606 ballots cast out of 86,839 eligible voters, for a voter turnout of 30.6%.

== Results ==
- bold or ✓ indicates elected
- italics indicate incumbent
- "SS", where data is available, indicates representative for Edmonton's South Side, with a minimum South Side representation instituted after the city of Strathcona, south of the North Saskatchewan River, amalgamated into Edmonton on February 1, 1912.

=== Mayor ===
Party	Candidate	Votes	%
Independent	Sidney Parsons	8,954	33.89%
Citizens' Committee	Duncan Innes	8,320	31.49%
Independent	George Gleave	6,760	25.59%
Independent	Thomas Graham	2,095	7.93%
Independent	Frederick Speed	289	1.09%

=== Aldermen ===
Party	Candidate	Votes		Elected
Citizens' Committee	Harold Tanner	20,779	SS	✓
Citizens' Committee	Armour Ford	20,530		✓
Citizens' Committee	Rupert Clare	19,598		✓
Citizens' Committee	Kenneth Lawson	18,519		✓
Citizens' Committee	Edwin Clarke	16,605		✓
Citizens' Committee	William Hawrelak	15,402	SS	✓
Independent	Joseph Kallal	12,120		
Independent	George Linney	11,761		
Independent	Julia Kiniski	6,370		

=== Public school trustees ===
George Brown, Mary Butterworth (SS), J W K Shortreed, and John Thorogood (SS) were acclaimed.

=== Separate (Catholic) school trustees ===
Joseph Gallant, Lawrence Keylor (SS), Ambrose O'Neill, and Joseph Pilon were acclaimed.

=== Plebiscites ===
- Financial plebiscite items required a minimum two-thirds "Yes" majority to bring about action

==== Paving ====
Shall Council pass a bylaw creating a debenture debt in the sum of $1,260,000.00 for City share of paving, mainly on arterial streets and bus routes. Serial Plan debentures to be issued, 30-year term; interest rate 3 3/4 per centum per annum, payable semi-annually?

- Yes - 9,968 (87.6%)
- No - 1,409

==== High Level Bridge ====
Shall Council pass a bylaw creating a debenture debt in the sum of $1,000,000.00 for the purpose of providing a four-lane vehicular traffic deck on the High Level Bridge to relieve serious traffic congestion between North and South Sides of the river. Serial plan debentures to be issued, 30-year term; interest 3 3/4 per centum per annum, payable semi-annually?

- Yes - 8,931 (75.4%)
- No - 2,656

==== Street Grading, Cleaning, and Flushing ====
Shall Council pass a bylaw creating a debenture debt in the sum of $140,000.00 to purchase equipment for the Engineer's Department of the City for grading, cleaning and flushing of streets and catch basins and for scavenger trucks and similar purposes?

- Yes - 9,531 (85.9%)
- No - 1,558

==== Engineer's Department Storage ====
Shall Council pass a bylaw creating a debenture debt in the sum of $110,000.00 for the erection of one building on the North Side of the river and one building on the South Side, both said buildings to be used for the storage of equipment of the Engineer's Department?

- Yes - 6,954 (67.1%)
- No - 3,400

==== Paving Plant ====
Shall Council pass a bylaw creating a debenture debt in the sum of $25,000.00 to increase the capacity of the City's paving plant?

- Yes - 8,670 (82.2%)
- No - 1,877

==== Fire Stations ====
Shall Council pass a bylaw creating a debenture debt in the sum of $245,000.00 for new fire stations and additions to existing fire stations, including Alarms communication Building, for the City Fire Department?

- Yes - 10,231 (90.4%)
- No - 1,091

==== Fire Fighting Equipment ====
Shall Council pass a bylaw creating a debenture debt in the sum of $405,000.00 to purchase equipment and apparatus, such as pumpers, aerial ladder, high pressure fog wagon, fire alarm extension system and revision of outside electrical circuits to improve fire fighting capacity of the Fire Department?

- Yes - 10,111 (90.7%)
- No - 1,039

==== Comfort Stations ====
Shall Council pass a bylaw creating a debenture debt in the sum of $40,000.00 to erect comfort station buildings?

- Yes - 7,255 (69.5%)
- No - 3,190
