= 1947 Edmonton municipal election =

Municipal election in Alberta, Canada

The 1947 municipal election was held November 5, 1947 to elect a mayor and five aldermen to sit on Edmonton City Council and four trustees to sit on the public school board, while four trustees were acclaimed to the separate school board. Voters also voted on two plebiscites, one of which approved two-year mayoral terms. Accordingly, Harry Ainlay's election made him the first mayor of Edmonton to serve a two-year term.

There were ten aldermen on city council, but five of the positions were already filled: Sidney Bowcott, Athelstan Bissett (Southside), Sidney Parsons, James Ogilvie, and Frederick John Mitchell had each been elected to two-year terms in 1946 and were still in office.

There were seven trustees on the public school board, but three of the positions were already filled: James MacDonald, John Morrison, and Robert Rae had been elected to two-year terms in 1946 and were still in office. The same was true on the separate board, where Adrian Crowe (SS), Francis Killeen, and James O'Hara were continuing.

== Voter turnout ==
There were 18,676 ballots cast out of 76,112 eligible voters, for a voter turnout of 24.5%.

== Results ==
- bold or ✓ indicates elected
- italics indicate incumbent
- "SS", where data is available, indicates representative for Edmonton's South Side, with a minimum South Side representation instituted after the city of Strathcona, south of the North Saskatchewan River, amalgamated with the City of Edmonton on February 1, 1912.

=== Mayor ===
Party	Candidate	Votes	%
Civic Democratic Alliance	Harry Ainlay	16,948	91.60%
Independent	Frederick Speed	1,554	8.40%

=== Aldermen ===
Party	Candidate	Votes		Elected
Citizens' Committee	Armour Ford	10,998		✓
Citizens' Committee	Harold Tanner	10,909	SS	✓
Citizens' Committee	James McCrie Douglas	10,730	SS	✓
Citizens' Committee	Charles Gariepy	9,398		✓
Citizens' Committee	George Gleave	8,229		✓
Civic Democratic Alliance	Percy Gwynne	7,031		
Civic Democratic Alliance	John Gillies	6,953		
Civic Democratic Alliance	Charles Willis	6,135		
Civic Democratic Alliance	Norman Finnemore	5,451		
Civic Democratic Alliance	Charles Gilbert	5,105		
Independent	Arthur Hamelin	3,373		
Independent	Julia Kiniski	2,133		
Independent	Amy Speed	1,133		

=== Public school trustees ===
Party	Candidate	Votes		Elected
Citizens' Committee	Mary Butterworth	10,490	SS	✓
Citizens' Committee	George Brown	10,390		✓
Citizens' Committee	Stewart Graham	8,697		✓
Citizens' Committee	William Morrow	8,617	SS	✓
Civic Democratic Alliance	Elizabeth Haynes	7,463		
Civic Democratic Alliance	Reta Rowan	5,344		
Civic Democratic Alliance	Robert Boutilier	4,701		
Civic Democratic Alliance	William Chmiliar	4,031		
Independent	Frederick Speed	1,416		

=== Separate (Catholic) school trustees ===
Weldon Bateman (SS), Joseph Gallant, Thomas Malone, and Joseph Pilon were acclaimed.

=== Plebiscites ===
- Financial plebiscite items required a minimum two-thirds "Yes" majority to bring about action

==== Mayoral Term ====
Are you in favour of a two-year term for Mayor?

- Yes - 9,959
- No - 8,312

==== Civic Auditorium/Art and Recreation Centre ====
Shall the Council pass a bylaw to create a debt in the sum of $1,500,00.00 for the purpose of constructing, within the City of Edmonton, a municipal building to be used as a Civic Auditorium and an Art and Recreation Centre and issue serial debentures in the sum not exceeding 30 years with interest not exceeding 4% payable semi-annually?

- Yes - 4,362
- No - 4,105
