= 1946 Edmonton municipal election =

Municipal election in Alberta, Canada

The 1946 municipal election was held November 6, 1946 to elect a mayor and six aldermen to sit on Edmonton City Council, four trustees to sit on the public school board, while four trustees were acclaimed to the separate school board.

There were ten aldermen on city council, but four of the positions were already filled: James McCrie Douglas, John Munro, John Gillies, and Charles Gariepy were all elected to two year terms in 1945 and were still in office. Ethel Browne (SS) had also been elected to a two-year term in 1945, but had resigned due to ill health; accordingly, Harold Tanner (SS) was elected to a one-year term.

There were seven trustees on the public school board, but three of the positions were already filled: Mary Butterworth (SS), E S Haynes, and Armour Ford had been elected to two year terms in 1945 and were still in office. Albert Ottewell (SS) had also been elected to a two-year term in 1945, but had died; accordingly, Andrew Stewart was elected to a one-year term.

On the separate board, there were four vacancies out of seven seats, as Joseph Gallant, Thomas Malone, and Joseph Pilon were continuing. William Wilde (SS) had been elected to a two-year term in 1945, but had resigned; accordingly, newcomer Weldon Bateman (SS) was acclaimed to a one-year term.

== Voter turnout ==
There were 24,919 ballots cast out of 73,852 eligible voters, for a voter turnout of 33.7%.

== Results ==
- bold or ✓ indicates elected
- italics indicate incumbent
- "SS", where data is available, indicates representative for Edmonton's South Side, with a minimum South Side representation instituted after the city of Strathcona, south of the North Saskatchewan River, amalgamated into Edmonton on February 1, 1912.

=== Mayor ===
Party	Candidate	Votes	%
Civic Democratic Alliance	Harry Ainlay	22,839	92.44%
Independent	Thomas Cairns	1,868	7.56%

=== Aldermen ===
Party	Candidate	Votes		Elected
Citizens' Committee	Sidney Bowcott	14,161		✓
Citizens' Committee	Athelstan Bissett	13,867	SS	✓
Citizens' Committee	Harold Tanner	13,799	SS	✓
Citizens' Committee	Sidney Parsons	13,065		✓
Citizens' Committee	James Ogilvie	12,067		✓
Citizens' Committee	Frederick John Mitchell	12,287		✓
Civic Democratic Alliance	Percy Gwynne	10,682		
Civic Democratic Alliance	Charles Willis	9,586		
Civic Democratic Alliance	Edith Rogers	9,439		
Civic Democratic Alliance	Norman Finnemore	8,829		
Civic Democratic Alliance	Williston Haszard	8,412		
Civic Democratic Alliance	Charles Gilbert	8,192		
Independent	Julia Kiniski	2,635		

=== Public school trustees ===
Party	Candidate	Votes	Elected
Citizens' Committee	Andrew Stewart	13,830	✓
Citizens' Committee	James MacDonald	12,779	✓
Civic Democratic Alliance	John Morrison	11,739	✓
Citizens' Committee	Robert Rae	11,106	✓
Citizens' Committee	Carl W. Clement	10,590	
Civic Democratic Alliance	William W. R. Boyes	9,636	
Civic Democratic Alliance	John Moon	8,650	

=== Separate (Catholic) school trustees ===
Adrian Crowe (SS), Francis Killeen, James O'Hara, and Weldon Bateman (SS) were acclaimed.

=== Daylight Saving Plebiscite ===
Are you in favour of Daylight Saving Time being put into operation in the City of Edmonton from a date in the month of April to a date in the month in September?

- Yes - 13,837
- No - 10,471

With the positive referendum result, Mayor Ainlay brought in daylight saving time just in the City of Edmonton in April 1947. The Social Credit Conservative government banned DST and it would not be until 1971 that Edmonton would be allowed to go on DST.
