= Julia Kiniski =

Julia Kiniski (1899 in Poland – October 11, 1969 in Edmonton, Alberta), served seven years on the Edmonton City Council, from 1963 until her death in 1969. Prior to her election in 1963, she ran as an independent or as a candidate for grassroots or reform-minded parties unsuccessfully in 14 city elections between 1945 and 1962.

Julia, born Warshawski, emigrated with the family to Chipman, Alberta in 1912. At the age of sixteen she married her husband, Nicholas, with whom she raised six children, including wrestler Gene Kiniski. In 1936, Kiniski and her husband moved to Edmonton. He worked as a barber, making $5 ($100 today) a week, while she sold cosmetics and managed a café. Having dropped out of school after Grade 7, in later life Kiniski "[e]nrolled in University of Alberta Extension courses, studying psychology, philosophy and world affairs".

She campaigned as a candidate for election to Edmonton city council numerous times starting in 1945. Kiniski "became an accomplished, albeit unconventional, speaker". As a politician, she was "[k]nown and loved as supporter of the common people". Her persistence and eventual success spurred renewed civic involvement:

Her 1963 victory was said to have reinvigorated public interest in City Council. While Kiniski's outspoken criticism of city spending did not make her popular with civic administrators, her defence of the "little people" captured the public's imagination. A local radio personality, Jerry Forbes, recorded a song about her set to the tune of "Hello Dolly".

As a member of the city council, "[o]ne of her pet projects... was her fight to support tenants in basement suites". That is, to allow basement rental suites, which was a way for empty-nesters to cover the cost of housing.

She died of a heart attack at the age of 70 in 1969. She was succeeded in office by her son, Julian Kinisky. He won his mother's old seat in a 1970 by-election.

An elementary school in Edmonton is named for her, as is the neighbourhood of Kiniski Gardens in Mill Woods.

== Table of election results ==
Elections won are in bold. From 1899 to 1963, Edmonton held annual municipal elections, replacing half of the alderman each year. Kiniski stood for election in 14 of 18 elections from 1945 to 1962, winning in her 15th attempt in 1963. Beginning in 1964, all seats were up for election every two years.

Year	Party	Votes	Result
1945	Independent	1,305	last place
1946	Independent	2,635	last place
1947	Independent	2,133	second to last
1948	Independent	1,783	third to last
1949	Independent	6,370	last place
1951	Independent	5,045	last place
1953	Independent	3,471	last place
1954	Independent	1,758	third to last
1956	Independent	3,999	last place
1957	Independent	7,444	10th out of 19
1958	Edmonton Voters Association	4,283	9th out of 14
1959	Edmonton Voters Association	9,703	11th out of 17
1961	Independent	12,451	8th out of 18
1962	Civic Rights Protective; Association	12,643	8th out of 13
**1963**	**United Voters Association**	**36,861**	**5th out of 14**
**1964**	**Civil Rights Association**	**54,637**	**2nd out of a large field**
**1966**	**Civil Rights Association**	**53,969**	**3rd out of a large field**
**1968**	**no affiliation**	**35,760**	**9th out of a large field**
