= 1964 Edmonton municipal election =

Municipal election in Alberta, Canada

The 1964 Edmonton municipal election was held October 14, 1964 to elect a mayor and twelve aldermen to sit on Edmonton City Council and seven trustees to sit on each of the public and separate school boards.

This was the first election since 1898 in which all officials were elected in the same year, and marked the introduction of a system whereby elections would be held only every two years. It was also the first election that elected twelve aldermen; previous councils had had only ten aldermen.

The forty-six candidates for alderman were among the most in Edmonton's history.

The election for aldermen was conducted, like that for mayor, at-large city-wide. Thus the ballot for each voter held the names of the 46 candidates for aldermen. (This record for overall number of candidates was surpassed in the 2021 Edmonton municipal election. In 2021, the candidates were divided into twelve districts, and no ballot held more than 12 aldermanic candidates.)

== Voter turnout ==
There were 94,880 ballots cast out of 199,259 eligible voters, for a voter turnout of 47.6%.

== Results ==
(bold indicates elected, italics indicates incumbent)

=== Mayor ===
Party	Candidate	Votes	%
Independent	William Hawrelak	56,328	60.12%
Independent	George Prudham	37,365	39.88%

=== Aldermen ===
Councillors were elected through plurality block voting , with each voter able to cast up to 12 votes. For that reason, more than 880,000 votes were cast in this election by the roughly 100,000 voters who cast a ballot.

46 candidates in total

Party slates:

Better Civic Government Committee 11 candidates 5 elected

Civil Rights Association 7 candidates 2 elected

United Voters Association 9 candidates 2 elected

Independents 19 candidates 3 elected

Party	Candidate	Votes	Elected
Better Civic Government Committee	Morris Weinlos	55,827	✓
Civil Rights Association	Julia Kiniski	54,637	✓
Better Civic Government Committee	Ethel Wilson	51,246	✓
Independent	Kenneth Newman	49,742	✓
United Voters Association	Ivor Dent	45,276	✓
Independent	John Leslie Bodie	43,033	✓
United Voters Association	Ed Leger	38,747	✓
Better Civic Government Committee	Vincent Dantzer	37,421	✓
Independent	Angus McGugan	35,322	✓
Better Civic Government Committee	Frank Edwards	27,211	✓
Better Civic Government Committee	Kathleen McCallum	23,023	✓
Civil Rights Association	Robert Franklin Lambert	21,457	✓
United Voters Association	Norbert Berkowitz	21,277	
Civil Rights Association	Allan Welsh	20,069	
Better Civic Government Committee	M. A. Nugent	18,894	
United Voters Association	William Orobko	18,519	
Better Civic Government Committee	Conrad Korowan	18,464	
Better Civic Government Committee	Jack Holmes	17,358	
Civil Rights Association	K. L. McAuley	16,567	
Independent	P. J. Ryan	16,468	
Better Civic Government Committee	G. D. Newcombe	16,096	
United Voters Association	Ian Nicoll	15,376	
Better Civic Government Committee	P. C. C. Marshall	15,106	
Independent	G. A. O'Hara	13,481	
Independent	C. J. Primeau	13,034	
Independent	F. Kurylo	12,458	
Civil Rights Association	Joyce Kurie	12,417	
Independent	Jack Kirk	12,175	
Civil Rights Association	Sol Estrin	12,089	
Independent	L. M. Campbell	11,930	
United Voters Association	M. E. English	11,772	
United Voters Association	A. Powers	11,699	
United Voters Association	Peter Savaryn	11,679	
United Voters Association	R. J. Dunseith	10,531	
Independent	D. M. McLeod	10,383	
Independent	L. E. Messier	10,089	
Independent	J. O. A. Peets	9,092	
Independent	R. Doyle	8,751	
Independent	E. E. Aldridge	8,403	
Independent	John Sehn	7,620	
Independent	J. R. Lakusta	7,386	
Civil Rights Association	Ivar Vanags	6,357	
Better Civic Government Committee	Irvin Nessel	6,451	
Independent	W. Makowecki	5,282	
Independent	Jan Motyl	5,026	
Independent	Doug Tomlinson*	4,685	

- Doug Tomlinson was member of the Communist Party.

=== Public school trustees ===
Each voter could cast 7 votes (plurality block voting).

Party	Candidate	Votes	Elected
Better Education Association	Milton Lazerte	37,344	✓
Quality Education Council	Edith Rogers	37,257	✓
Better Education Association	Earl Buxton	36,333	✓
Better Civic Government Committee	Vernon Johnson	31,047	✓
Better Civic Government Committee	James Falconer	30,482	✓
Better Education Association	John Bracco	26,626	✓
Better Education Association	Herbert Smith	25,346	✓
Better Civic Government Committee	Ernest Hanna	20,741	
Better Education Association	James Young	19,991	
Better Education Association	Alice Jamha	19,586	
Better Civic Government Committee	Cec Purves	16,200	
Better Education Association	Grant Fawcett	15,217	
Quality Education Council	Dorothy Preston	14,532	
Quality Education Council	I. C. Dare	13,893	
Quality Education Council	Arnold Rapske	12,699	
Better Civic Government Committee	R. Byrnes Fleuty	12,254	
Quality Education Council	John Poppit	9,668	
Independent	William Chomyn	7,652	
Independent	Laura Tuomi	7,472	
Quality Education Council	Norman Spratt	6,621	
Quality Education Council	Arthur Latter	6,065	

=== Separate (Catholic) school trustees ===
Party	Candidate	Votes	Elected
Independent	Orest Demco	14,362	✓
Independent	G. R. Boileau	13,693	✓
Independent	Jean McDonald	12,599	✓
Independent	A. A. Gorman	12,518	✓
Independent	Bernard Feehan	12,336	✓
Independent	Edward Stack	12,091	✓
Independent	Harry Carrigan	9,626	✓
Independent	Bill Diachuk	8,936	
Independent	George Hertz	7,713	
Independent	L. A. Ares	6,354	
