= Ivor Dent =

Canadian politician (1924–2009)

Ivor Graham Dent

28th Mayor of Edmonton
- In office October 16, 1968 – October 16, 1974
- Preceded by: Vincent M. Dantzer
- Succeeded by: William Hawrelak

Alderman on the Edmonton City Council
- In office October 16, 1963 – October 16, 1968

Personal details
- Born: February 7, 1924 Prince Albert, Saskatchewan
- Died: March 29, 2009 (aged 85) Edmonton, Alberta
- Party: United Voters Association
- Other political affiliations: Co-operative Commonwealth Federation of Alberta, New Democratic Party of Canada, Independent
- Spouse: Aileen
- Children: Charles Dent, 3 others
- Education: University of Saskatchewan (B.A.); University of Alberta (B.Ed., M.Admin.); University of Oregon (PhD in Educational Administration)
- Profession: Teacher

Ivor Graham Dent, CM (February 7, 1924 – March 29, 2009) was a politician from Alberta, Canada. He served as mayor of Edmonton from 1968-1974 and was a candidate for the House of Commons of Canada and the Legislative Assembly of Alberta on behalf of the CCF and the NDP parties.

== Early life ==
Ivor Dent was born in Prince Albert, Saskatchewan on February 7, 1924. During World War II, he attempted to enlist in the Royal Canadian Air Force, but was rejected. He subsequently took work as an office boy for Canadian Pacific until he was accepted to the air force a year later where he served as a bombardier for three years.

After the war, he married his wife, Aileen in 1948 while he was studying science at the University of Saskatchewan. The couple had four children. Ivor Dent graduated with a Bachelor of Arts in Science in 1949.

Three years later, he and his wife moved to Edmonton and Dent enrolled at the University of Alberta, from which he earned a Bachelor of Education. After earning his second degree, he moved to Enchant, Alberta, where he taught for a year before returning to Edmonton to teach. He earned his third university degree, a Master of Administration, from the University of Alberta in 1956 and continued to teach.

== Early political career ==
Dent's first bid for office took place during the 1955 Alberta election, when he ran in Edmonton for the Co-operative Commonwealth Federation. He placed twenty-fifth of thirty candidates in the first ballot (the multi-seat constituency used a single transferable vote electoral system at the time) and was eliminated from contention on subsequent ballots.

Dent turned his attention to municipal politics. In the 1957 municipal election, he ran for alderman on Edmonton City Council. He finished seventh out of nineteen, falling short of the top five placings needed to be elected. Efforts during the 1959 and 1960 elections (in which he placed tenth of seventeen and eighth of fifteen, respectively) were similarly unsuccessful, and Dent took a two-year hiatus from politics, to earn his doctorate in educational administration from the University of Oregon.

Upon his return to Edmonton, he took up a position as a school vice principal. He ran for the leadership of the newly formed Alberta New Democratic Party in January 1962, losing to Neil Reimer, but was elected party president.

Dent ran in the 1963 federal election in Edmonton East for the New Democratic Party. He finished fourth of five candidates, defeating only Communist W.A. Tuomi, as incumbent Progressive Conservative William Skoreyko was handily re-elected.

Dent was finally elected to office in the 1963 municipal election, when he was elected to a one-year aldermanic term (he placed fourth of sixteen). He was re-elected to a two-year term in the 1964 municipal election, in which he placed fifth of forty-six candidates, and in the 1966 election, in which he placed second out of forty-four candidates.

== Mayor ==
After five years as an alderman, Dent ran for mayor in the 1968 election, in which he defeated his fellow aldermen Reginald Easton and John Leslie Bodie in a close three-way race (he was the first mayor elected to a three-year, rather than a two-year, term). He was re-elected in 1971, when he survived a challenge from alderman Julian Kinisky, but his second term didn't go as smoothly as the first. A damaging transit strike cost Dent support from all sides.

In the 1974 election, Dent faced credible challenges from former mayor William Hawrelak (who had returned to municipal politics after vowing never to do so) and alderman Cec Purves. He wound up losing to both of them. Hawrelak was elected and Dent finished in third place in a seven candidate race.

Although he was out of office by the time they occurred, Dent is credited by many with bringing the 1978 Commonwealth Games to Edmonton.

== Further elections, awards, and retirement ==
After his defeat, Dent went to Oxford University to study public administration. Upon his return to Canada, he became the principal of Rundle Elementary School, where he stayed until his retirement in 1980. In 1995 he joined the Board of Directors of SOS Children's Villages Canada until 2001.

He attempted to reclaim his old office in the 1977 election, but finished in fourth place after the victor Purves, alderman Laurence Decore (himself a future mayor), and Terry Cavanagh (the alderman Council had selected to complete the deceased Hawrelak's term). He did not return to municipal politics, but ran in a 1986 federal by-election in Pembina for the New Democratic Party. Although he entered the race as the favourite, he was narrowly defeated by Progressive Conservative Walter van de Walle.

He was admitted as a Member to the Order of Canada in 1984, and was awarded the Alberta Centennial Medal in 2005. He was defeated in a 1990 bid for the chairmanship of the Commonwealth Games Federation.

== Death ==
On March 29, 2009 Ivor Dent died from Alzheimer's disease.
