= Vincent Dantzer =

Canadian politician

Vincent Martin Dantzer

Member of the House of Commons of Canada for Okanagan North
- In office 18 February 1980 – 21 November 1988
- Preceded by: George Whittaker
- Succeeded by: District abolished

27th Mayor of Edmonton
- In office March 1965 – 16 October 1968
- Preceded by: William Hawrelak
- Succeeded by: Ivor Dent

Alderman on the Edmonton City Council
- In office 17 October 1962 – March 1965

Personal details
- Born: 2 October 1923 Rush Lake, Saskatchewan
- Died: 13 March 2001 (aged 77) Vernon, British Columbia
- Party: Progressive Conservative Party of Canada, Civic Government Association, Better Civic Government Committee
- Spouse: Mary Catherine
- Children: Nine
- Education: University of Alberta, University of Toronto
- Profession: Lawyer

Vincent Martin Dantzer (2 October 1923 – 13 March 2001) was a Canadian lawyer, economist, and politician, a member of the House of Commons of Canada, and a mayor of Edmonton, Alberta.

== Early life ==
Dantzer was born in Rush Lake, Saskatchewan. He enlisted in the Royal Canadian Air Force in 1942, and served as a Flying Officer in the Burma Campaign. He left the military in 1946, and began studying economics at the University of Saskatchewan, from which he graduated with an honours degree in 1948. He continued his studies at the University of Toronto, where he earned a Master of Arts in economics.

He worked for the Canadian government's department of Trade and Commerce as a research economist in 1949 before returning to Saskatchewan to work in the provincial government's budget bureau. He left this position and moved to Edmonton to lecture in political science at the University of Alberta, where he also earned a law degree in 1956.

The following year, he started a law practice and worked as senior partner in a nine-person firm. He would remain with that firm until leaving Edmonton in 1970.

== Municipal politics ==
Dantzer's first attempt at elected office took place in 1956, when he ran for the separate (Roman Catholic) school board in that year's municipal election. He finished first of four candidates in that election, and became the board's chair. He was re-elected in the 1958 election, but was unseated in 1960. He would not try to regain his position.

Instead, he ran for alderman on Edmonton City Council in the 1962 election. He finished fifth of thirteen candidates, and became one of five candidates elected to a two-year term. He was re-elected in the 1964 election, finishing eighth of forty-six candidates (that election marked the end of staggered aldermanic terms in Edmonton; accordingly, all twelve of the city's aldermen were elected at once).

On 11 March 1965, mayor William Hawrelak was expelled from office by the Alberta Court of Queen's Bench, which found that he had violated the City Act in his dealings with a development company that he partly owned. City Council selected Dantzer to take his place. Dantzer was able to defeat Hawrelak in the 1966 election, but did not seek re-election at the conclusion of this term. During his time as mayor, Dantzer served as President of the Federation of Canadian Municipalities in 1967.

In 1970, not long after leaving municipal politics, Dantzer moved to Vernon, British Columbia where he became the senior partner in a six-person firm that he founded.

== Federal politics ==
In the 1980 federal election, Dantzer ran for the House of Commons of Canada as the Progressive Conservative candidate in Okanagan North. He won an easy victory over his two challengers, and was re-elected by an increased margin in the 1984 federal election.

He did not seek re-election in the 1988 election, and did not return to public life thereafter.

== Personal life and legacy ==
Dantzer was married to Mary Catherine; the couple had nine children.

Vincent Dantzer died of heart failure on 13 March 2001.

Dantzer's Hill in Edmonton is named in his honour.
