= Stanley A. Milner =

Canadian businessman and politician (1930–2021)

Stanley A. Milner OC AOE MSM CD
- Born: Stanley Albert Milner; 1930; Calgary, Alberta, Canada
- Died: April 21, 2021 (aged 90–91); Edmonton, Alberta, Canada
- Education: University of Alberta (BSc 1951)
- Occupations: president of Chieftain International, Inc.
- Awards: Alberta Order of Excellence (1995)

Stanley Albert Milner OC AOE MSM CD (1930 – April 21, 2021) was a Canadian businessman and politician from Alberta.

== Early life ==
Milner was born in Calgary, Alberta in 1930 and raised in Turner Valley, Alberta. He attended school there as well as in Saskatoon, Gimli and Winnipeg, and later attended the University of Alberta, from which he attained a Bachelor of Science degree. He also participated in the Canadian Officer Training Corps as a cadet.

== Career ==
Upon graduation from university, Milner began his career in the oil and petroleum business as an investor around the time of the nearby Leduc No. 1 discovery. He would also briefly help in developing a natural gas service in the interior of British Columbia. Later, Milner, along with his brothers would start the Canadian Chieftain Petroleums Corporation. In 1964, he would also found Chieftain Development Co. Ltd, which he would work for until it was sold to Alberta Energy Company Ltd. in 1988. In 1988, he founded Chieftain International, Inc., of which he was president and CEO.

Milner also served in directorship positions for Alberta Energy Company, Canadian Imperial Bank of Commerce, Canadian Pacific Limited, Banister Continental Ltd., Canadian Surety Company, CP Air Limited, Delhi International Oil Corporation, Guaranty Trust Company of Canada, Pan-Alberta Gas Ltd., Southern Union Company, Supron Energy Corporation, Wardair, Inc., and Woodward Stores Limited.

He also served a term on the Edmonton City Council from 1962 to 1963. He ran unsuccessfully for Mayor of Edmonton in the 1963 Edmonton municipal election, narrowly losing to William Hawrelak. After his aldermanic term he served as chair of the Edmonton Public Library Board until 1968. During his time with the library he advocated for a new central downtown branch; the branch was later built and named the Stanley A. Milner Library in 1996. He has also involved himself in many positions in organizations throughout the city of Edmonton, including the Board of Governors of the Royal Alexandra Hospital and the University of Alberta Hospital; the Boards of the Edmonton Community Foundation, Junior Achievement, Edmonton Northlands, Edmonton Symphony Orchestra and the Edmonton Eskimo Football Club; chairman of the Salvation Army Appeal and the Corporate Division of the United Way.

An advocate of the military, Milner did not serve but in later life held honorary positions in the South Alberta Light Horse and the Loyal Edmonton Regiment.

Other positions he held were President of the Independent Petroleum Association of Canada and the Alberta Chamber of Resources; member of the Listed Company Advisory Committee of the American Stock Exchange, the Board of the Edmonton Chamber of Commerce, the Board of Governors of the Olympic Trust of Canada and the Young Presidents’ Organization; Director of the Conference Board of Canada; Chairman of the Board of Governors of the University of Alberta; and member of the World Business Council.

He was a recipient of an honorary degree of Doctor of Laws from the University of Alberta, the City of Edmonton’s Certificate of Meritorious Service, the Wall Street Transcript Bronze and Gold Awards for the Top Chief Executive Officer in the Canadian Oil Industry; the University of Alberta’s Canadian Business Leader Award; and the 125th Anniversary of Confederation Commemorative Medal. He received the Alberta Order of Excellence in 1995, and the Order of Canada in 2003. He died on April 21, 2021.

== See also ==
- Stanley A. Milner library
