= Abe William Miller =

Canadian lawyer and politician

City of Edmonton Alderman
- In office November 7, 1951 – November 3, 1957

Member of the Legislative Assembly of Alberta
- In office June 29, 1955 – June 18, 1959 Serving with Edgar Gerhart (1955-1959) Ernest Manning (1955-1959) John Page (1955-1959) James Prowse (1955-1959) Joseph Ross (1955-1959) Harold Tanner (1955-1959)
- Preceded by: Elmer Roper
- Succeeded by: District Abolished
- Constituency: Edmonton

Personal details
- Born: March 25, 1897
- Died: September 30, 1964 (aged 67)
- Party: Liberal
- Occupation: lawyer politician

Abe William Miller (March 25, 1897 – September 30, 1964) was a Canadian lawyer and politician. He served in office on both civic and provincial levels of government in the province of Alberta. He served as an Alderman for the city of Edmonton from 1951 to 1957 and as a member of the Legislative Assembly of Alberta from 1955 to 1959 sitting as a member of the Liberal caucus in opposition.

== Early life ==
Abe William Miller was born in Hungary in 1897. He moved with his family to Canada in 1899 and later settled in the Edmonton area in 1914. He attended post secondary education at the University of Alberta graduating in 1925 becoming a lawyer.

== Political career ==
=== Municipal ===
Miller ran for a seat to Edmonton City Council in the 1951 Edmonton municipal election. He won the second place seat out of five in the field of thirteen candidates win his first two-year term as Alderman.

Miller ran for a second term in the 1953 Edmonton municipal election. Turn out for the race was down significantly, he held his seat but his popular vote dropped in half. He finished in third place in the nine candidate race.

Miller ran for a third term in office in the 1955 Edmonton municipal election. He improved his popular vote heading the polls to take top spot in the field of eight candidates.

Miller ran provincially for a seat in 1955 and won. He held his seat on Edmonton council until his term expired in 1957.

=== Provincial ===
Miller ran for a seat to the Alberta Legislature in the 1955 Alberta general election. He stood as a Liberal candidate in the electoral district of Edmonton. Miller won the third place out of six seats to earn his first term in office.

The electoral district of Edmonton was abolished and split into numerous single member districts in the 1959 boundary redistribution. Miller ran for re-election in the new electoral district of Jasper West. He faced a hotly contested three way race against incumbent John Page and Social Credit candidate Richard Jamieson. Miller was defeated finished a distant third place.

== Late life ==
Miller died in 1964. The community of Miller in Edmonton is named in his honor.
