= Harold E. Tanner =

Canadian politician

Harold Eaid Tanner

City of Edmonton Alderman
- In office November 6, 1946 – October 19, 1955

Member of the Legislative Assembly of Alberta
- In office August 5, 1952 – June 18, 1959 Serving with Edgar Gerhart (1952-1959) Ernest Manning (1952-1959) Abe Miller (1955-1959) John Page (1952-1959) James Prowse (1952-1959) Elmer Ernest Roper (1952-1955) Joseph Ross (1952-1959)
- Preceded by: Clayton Adams and Lou Heard
- Succeeded by: District Abolished
- Constituency: Edmonton

Personal details
- Born: December 4, 1892 Tillsonburg, Ontario
- Died: June 28, 1982 (aged 89) Victoria, British Columbia
- Party: Liberal
- Occupation: service man, teacher and politician

Military service
- Allegiance: Canada
- Branch/service: Canadian Expeditionary Force
- Unit: 49th Battalion
- Battles/wars: World War I

Harold Eaid Tanner (December 4, 1892 – June 28, 1982) was a WWI soldier, teacher and Canadian politician. He served as an elected representative at both the civic and provincial levels of government in the province of Alberta. He served as an alderman on Edmonton City Council from 1946 to 1955. He served as a member of the Legislative Assembly of Alberta from 1952 to 1959, sitting as a Liberal MLA in opposition.

== Early life ==
Harold E. Tanner was born in Tillsonburg, Ontario in 1893. He served overseas with the 49th Battalion in World War I. After the war Tanner moved to Alberta and became a teacher and later a school principal. He worked at schools in Wetaskiwin and Stettler. He moved to Edmonton in 1928 and began working with the public school board until he retired in 1958. Tanner was also President of the Royal Canadian Legion.

== Political career ==
=== Municipal ===
Tanner ran for a seat to Edmonton City Council in the 1946 Edmonton municipal election.Out of the field of thirteen candidates, he won the third place seat out of the six that were filled. Tanner's first term was only a year on council, instead of the regular two-year term, because he was elected merely to fill out the last half of the two-year term of fellow southsider Ethel May Browne, who had resigned due to poor health.

Tanner ran for re-election in the 1947 Edmonton municipal election. His vote tally was very close to first place, just 89 votes behind the leader Armour Ford. Of the field of thirteen candidates running for the five open spots, Tanner won a two-year term.

Tanner ran for re-election in the 1949 Edmonton municipal election. This time Tanner was the most popular candidate of the nine in the race for the six open spots.

Tanner ran for re-election in the 1951 Edmonton municipal election. For the second time, Tanner headed the polls to finish first with a plurality over the field of thirteen candidates running for five spots.

After one year into his fourth term, Tanner won a seat to the Alberta Legislature in 1952. He decided to keep his municipal seat as well as being an MLA. While MLA, Tanner ran for re-election in the 1953 Edmonton municipal election. He once again finished in first place, easily winning re-election to one of the six open spots.

Tanner did not run for re-election to city council in 1957.

=== Provincial ===
Tanner ran for a seat to the Alberta Legislature while still an Edmonton municipal councillor in the 1952 Alberta general election. He ran as a Liberal candidate in the electoral district of Edmonton (at the time Edmonton was a city-wide district electing seven MLAs). He won the last seat to begin his first term in provincial office; he and two others being elected at the end with less than quota(about one-eighth of the votes).

Tanner won re-election in the 1955 Alberta general election. He did significantly better than in 1952, this time making quota.

Tanner retired from provincial politics at dissolution of the Assembly in 1959.

== Late life ==
Tanner moved to Victoria, British Columbia in 1966 and lived the rest of his life there. He died on June 28, 1982. The streets of Tanner Link and Tanner Wynd in the community of Terwillegar Towne Edmonton were named in his honor.
