= William Hawrelak =

Canadian politician (1915–1975)

24th Mayor of Edmonton
- In office November 7, 1951 – September 9, 1959
- Preceded by: Sidney Parsons
- Succeeded by: Frederick John Mitchell
- In office October 16, 1963 – March 11, 1965
- Preceded by: Elmer Ernest Roper
- Succeeded by: Vincent M. Dantzer
- In office October 16, 1974 – November 7, 1975
- Preceded by: Ivor Dent
- Succeeded by: Terry Cavanagh

Alderman on the Edmonton City Council
- In office November 2, 1949 – November 7, 1951

Personal details
- Born: October 4, 1915 Wasel, Alberta, Canada
- Died: November 7, 1975 (aged 60) Edmonton, Alberta, Canada
- Party: Citizens Committee, Independent
- Other political affiliations: Liberal Party of Canada
- Spouse: Pearl Shandro
- Children: Three daughters
- Occupation: Businessman

William Hawrelak (October 4, 1915 – November 7, 1975) was a politician in Alberta, Canada, the longest-serving mayor in Edmonton's history, and a candidate for election to the House of Commons of Canada.

== Early life ==
Hawrelak was born in Wasel, Alberta to Ukrainian immigrants Wasel/William and Anastasia Hawrelak (the family's ancestral name was Гавриляк (Havryliak)). (Wasel was named after William's father.) He married Pearl Shandro (daughter of Alberta MLA Andrew Shandro, after whom Hawrelak's home district was named) the pair had three daughters.

In 1945, Hawrelak moved to Edmonton and purchased the Prairie Rose Manufacturing Co., which made soft drinks. He served as president of the Alberta Farmer's Union and of the Edmonton Federation of Community Leagues before entering politics.

== Early career in municipal politics ==
Hawrelak's first attempt at political office took place in the 1948 municipal election, in which he ran for Edmonton City Council and was defeated, finishing seventh of twelve candidates for alderman. He was more successful in the next election, winning the last available aldermanic position by finishing sixth of nine candidates after being backed by the Citizens' Committee, a municipal political party dominated by English Canadian businessmen.

In 1951, he took over as mayor on an interim basis when Sidney Parsons had to leave the position for health reasons. In that year's election, he won the position more permanently by winning more than sixty-five percent of the vote and defeating the returned Parsons and one other candidate.

== First stint as mayor ==
Hawrelak initially saw considerable political success: his re-election bids in the 1953 and 1955 elections were unopposed, and in the 1957 election he easily dispatched his two challengers, both former aldermen, winning more than sixty-five percent of the vote.

Hawrelak presided over a time of prosperity resulting, in part, from the discovery of oil near Edmonton in 1947. The city was able to provide a variety of new facilities, including a main branch for the Edmonton Public Library, a new city hall, the Riverside Golf Course, the Valley Zoo, Fort Edmonton Park, the Groat Bridge, the Royal Alexandra Hospital, the Queen Elizabeth Planetarium, Borden Park, Coronation Park, Mayfair Park, and the Edmonton portion of the Yellowhead Trail (Highway 16).

In 1958, Ed Leger - who later joined the city council as the longest-serving alderman in Edmonton's history (1959–1986, except for a two year period after an unsuccessful run for mayor in 1961), later surpassed by Ron Hayter - presented a petition to city council that called for an investigation into the city administration. Leger alleged that Hawrelak had used his position to financially benefit himself, his family, and his associates.

An ensuing inquiry by Justice Marshall Porter found Hawrelak guilty of "gross misconduct" - including, in some cases, attempts to influence rezoning of land he owned - in six different land transactions. Hawrelak resigned September 9, 1959, but continued to deny any wrongdoing.

== Return to office and second stint ==
The city sued Hawrelak, and he ultimately paid $100,000 plus $4,000 in legal fees to settle the lawsuit; this settlement also made him eligible to again seek elected municipal office, which he did in the 1963 election. In an election that has been called the dirtiest in Edmonton's history, he narrowly defeated alderman Stanley A. Milner. His victory was marred by a riot that erupted when a group of students marching to city hall to protest Hawrelak's re-election victory were met by a mob loyal to the mayor, leading the Edmonton Journal - which was regularly critical of Hawrelak - to speculate that the mob was organized by the same people who "toured meetings during the recent election campaign with the sole purpose of preventing anti-Hawrelak candidates from speaking".

Hawrelak was re-elected in the 1964 election, defeating incumbent alderman and former Member of Parliament George Prudham, but his second stint as mayor also ended prematurely: on March 11, 1965, Chief Justice C.C. McLaurin of the Court of Queen's Bench of Alberta disqualified Hawrelak from his position after ruling that he had violated the City Act through his involvement with Sun Alta Builder's Ltd., of which he owned forty percent and which had bought land from the city while he was in office. However, he again denied it and appealed the decision up to the Supreme Court of Canada, which upheld it (he did win a partial victory in March 1975 when the same court reversed a ruling of a lower court that ordered that he return $80,117 in profits from the dealings to the city; the Supreme Court of Canada found that there were no profits to be returned).

== Out of office and federal politics ==
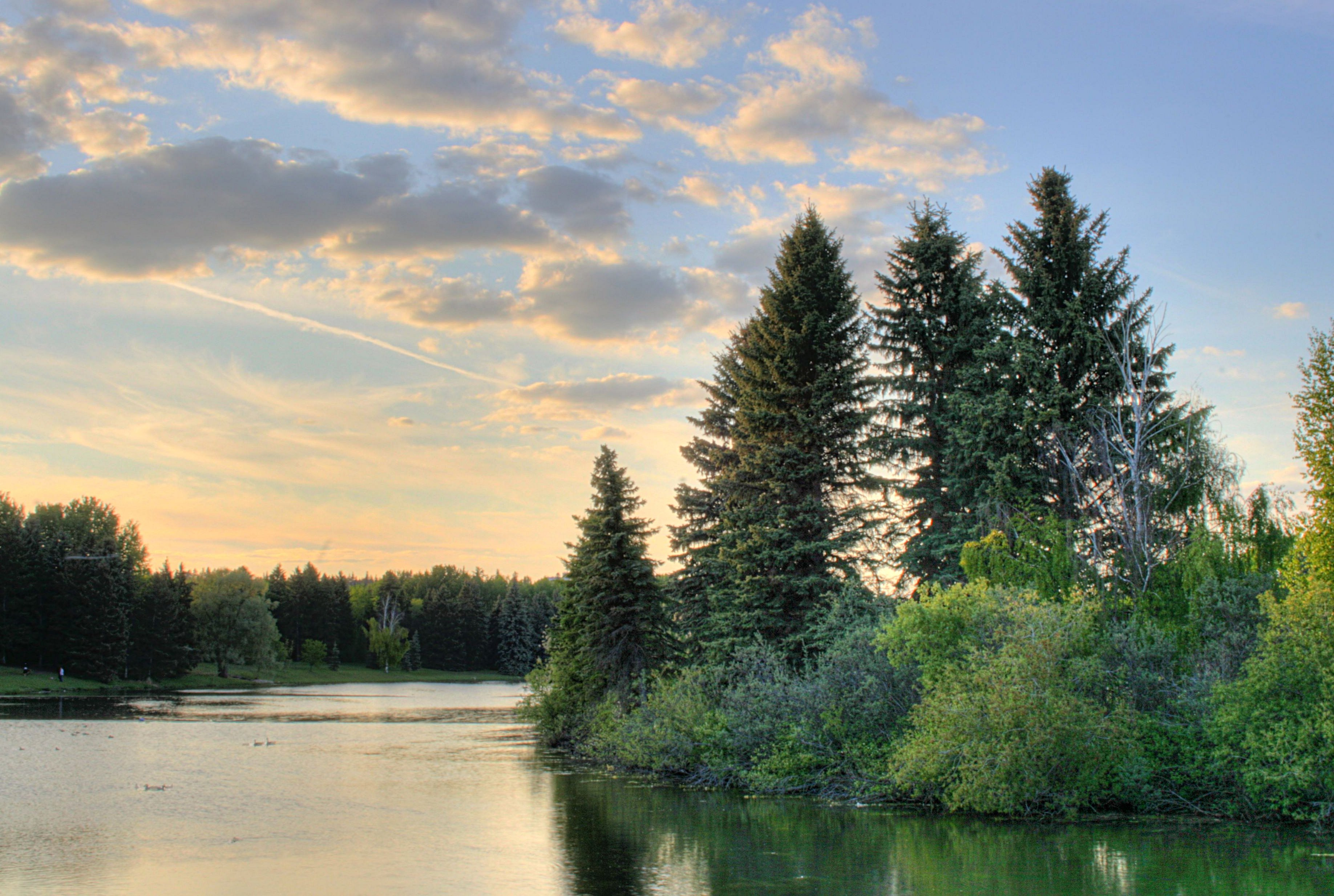
View of the lake in Hawrelak Park, Edmonton.

Hawrelak ran for mayor in the 1966 election, but was defeated by Vincent Dantzer, the man city council had chosen to replace him as mayor. This was the only mayoral defeat Hawrelak suffered in his career. After this defeat, he declared himself done with city politics. He turned his attention instead to the federal scene.

In the 1957 federal election, Hawrelak, still mayor and before his political troubles had started, had run as the Liberal Party of Canada candidate in Edmonton East. He had come within three hundred votes of unseating incumbent Social Credit Party of Canada MP Ambrose Holowach, but had not hitherto made any subsequent bids for federal election. This changed with the 1968 federal election. Hawrelak ran in Edmonton Centre. Denied the Liberal nomination, he ran instead as an "Independent Liberal". He finished third, behind Progressive Conservative Steve Paproski and official Liberal Donald Gray. He may have had some impact after all, however: the gap between the Conservative Paproski and the Liberal Gray was fewer than two hundred votes, while the independent Liberal Hawrelak won more than seven thousand.

== Third stint and death ==
Reversing himself, Hawrelak ran for mayor again in the 1974 election against incumbent Ivor Dent, future mayor Cec Purves, alderman David Ward, and three other candidates. Even in this crowded field, Hawrelak won more than forty-nine percent of the vote in his return to office. His last term was marked by a similar style of governance to his previous terms: he was accused of stacking city boards and commissions with his friends, he appointed a disbarred lawyer as his executive assistant, and allowed property taxes into his holdings to fall in arrears (which he characterized as an oversight). However, he also faced new opposition: the council on which he served included a number of urban reformers as well as his old nemesis, alderman Ed Leger. Hawrelak couldn't maintain the tight control to which he was accustomed.

Thirteen months after his election, on November 7, 1975, William Hawrelak died of a heart attack. More than ten thousand people came to pay their respects as his body lay in city council chambers.

== Legacy ==
In 1982, Mayfair Park was renamed William Hawrelak Park, in honour of Hawrelak and a legacy of his time as mayor, which included the period when Mayfair Park was created.

Preceded by Sidney Parsons	Mayor of Edmonton; 1951–1959	Succeeded by Frederick John Mitchell
Preceded by Elmer Ernest Roper	Mayor of Edmonton; 1964–1965	Succeeded by Vincent M. Dantzer
Preceded by Ivor Dent	Mayor of Edmonton; 1974–1975	Succeeded by Terry Cavanagh
