= Edith Rogers (Alberta politician) =

Member of Legislative Assembly of Alberta

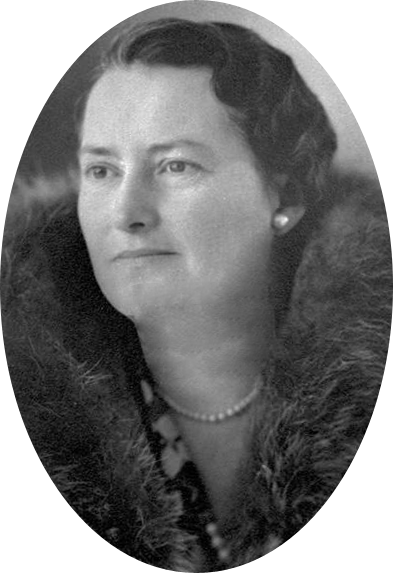
- Rogers in 1935

Member of the Legislative Assembly of Alberta
- In office August 22, 1935 – March 21, 1940
- Preceded by: John Edward Brownlee
- Succeeded by: Percy McKelvey
- Constituency: Ponoka

Personal details
- Born: Edith Blanche Cox; September 20, 1894 Eastville, Nova Scotia, Canada
- Died: July 17, 1985 (aged 90) Edmonton, Alberta, Canada
- Party: Social Credit (until 1940s); Co-operative Commonwealth Federation (from 1940s)
- Spouse: William Rogers (m. 1923; died 1968)
- Profession: Teacher

Edith Blanche Rogers (née Cox; September 20, 1894 – July 17, 1985) was a Canadian politician who served as a member of the Legislative Assembly of Alberta from 1935 until 1940. Born in Nova Scotia, she came west to Alberta to accept a job as a teacher. She later moved to Calgary where she encountered evangelist William Aberhart and became a convert to his social credit economic theories. After advocating these theories across the province, she was elected in the 1935 provincial election as a candidate of Aberhart's newly formed Social Credit League.

Left out of cabinet despite her loyalty to Aberhart, she sided with the insurgents during the 1937 Social Credit backbenchers' revolt, rejoining Aberhart's followers once a settlement was reached. She was defeated in the 1940 election. After her defeat, she abandoned Social Credit for the Cooperative Commonwealth Federation, moved to Edmonton, and served for fifteen years as a school trustee. Rogers died in 1985.

== Early life ==
Born in Eastville, Nova Scotia, to Samuel G. and Mahala (née Graham) Cox, Rogers was raised on a farm and attended Eastville High School and Normal School. She worked as a teacher in Nova Scotia until 1913, when she visited her aunt, Margaret Redmond, in Edgerton, Alberta. While there, she accepted an offer to teach at Bloomington School. She attended Camrose Normal School in 1914, after which she taught in Edgerton and near Tofield until 1918. Disillusioned with teaching in rural schoolhouses, she took a business course and began work as a bank teller for the Merchants Bank of Canada, which later merged with the Bank of Montreal, in Edgerton; this was an unusual career choice for a woman at the time. In 1922 she moved to Tofield, where she continued to work as a teller. The next year she moved to Killam, where she married William Rogers, the local high school principal, October 12, 1923.

In 1929, the couple moved to Calgary, where they became friends with William Aberhart and his family. Rogers's first foray into politics took place during the 1930 federal election, when she assisted with R. B. Bennett's successful Calgary West campaign. Governments' inability to end or alleviate the effects of the Great Depression soon disillusioned her with conventional politics. Upon hearing that Aberhart was beginning to incorporate politics and economics into his weekly gospel radio addresses, she began to listen and soon became a convert to his version of social credit.

== Early involvement in social credit ==
In 1932 Rogers convinced Aberhart to hold public meetings on social credit in Calgary; she subsequently organized neighbourhood study groups on the theory. In 1933 the Central Council of Social Credit in Calgary, which coordinated the city's sixty social credit study groups, named her women's organizer, in which capacity she held mass meetings designed to recruit women to social credit. In 1934 she embarked on a sixteen-month speaking tour of Alberta. At the same time, she organized social credit study groups around the province, including seventy-two in Edmonton. She concluded her tour by organizing a mass meeting there in the spring of 1935, where Aberhart spoke before 9,000 people.

When fissures appeared between Aberhart and people who supported the more orthodox version of social credit proposed by C. H. Douglas, the movement's British founder, Rogers remained steadfastly loyal to Aberhart. In the assessment of T. C. Byrne, her loyalty to Aberhart was second only to that of Ernest Manning, Aberhart's young protégé.

When Aberhart decided to run Social Credit candidates in the 1935 provincial election, he adopted an unusual system of candidate nomination: each constituency would nominate three or four candidates, with a committee headed by Aberhart naming one of them to be the party's candidate. Six different constituencies nominated Rogers as one of their candidates. Aberhart decided that she should run in Ponoka.

Her opponent from the governing United Farmers of Alberta (UFA) was the sitting MLA, John Edward Brownlee, who had resigned as Premier of Alberta but not as Member of the Legislative Assembly the previous year in the wake of a sex scandal in which he was sued for the seduction of a young woman. Brownlee biographer Franklin Foster speculated that the selection of a female candidate to run against the so-called "sober faced seducer" was a deliberate strategic decision by Aberhart. He noted that "aside from Aberhart himself, [Social Credit] could not have fielded a stronger candidate" in Ponoka.

== Member of the Legislative Assembly ==
Rogers won the seat with 2,295 votes, more than 1,400 ahead of Brownlee. In fact, the UFA lost every seat it contested, and Social Credit candidates won 56 of Alberta's 63 seats. Aberhart became premier. He did not appoint Rogers (or any other woman) to his cabinet, and Athabasca University historian Alvin Finkel has suggested that her gender cost her such an appointment. Female cabinet ministers were not unprecedented in Alberta (Irene Parlby was a cabinet minister throughout the UFA's time in office) and Finkel argues, given that Rogers was "recognized as sharp, articulate, and hard-working", that she could reasonably have expected a cabinet portfolio.

Despite her loyalty to Aberhart, Rogers became frustrated with his delay in implementing the social credit economic reforms he had promised. During the 1937 Social Credit backbenchers' revolt she sided with the insurgents who threatened to bring down the government unless it took concrete steps to implement social credit. Once the insurgents reached a settlement with Aberhart, she returned to her former position of loyalty.

She sought re-election as a Social Crediter in the 1940 election. Prior to this election, Social Credit's opponents, including Liberals, Conservatives, and those elements of the UFA that had not moved to Social Credit, formed the People's League, which ran nominally independent candidates.

The election in Ponoka, like in all districts outside Edmonton and Calgary, was determined through Instant-runoff voting. One of the People's League candidates, Percy McKelvey, came in first on the first count, leading second-place candidate Rogers by 13 votes, but not taking a majority of the votes. The Cooperative Commonwealth Federation (CCF) candidate C. A. Johnson was in a distant third. When Johnson's votes were redistributed, in accordance with Alberta's electoral laws at the time, McKelvey maintained his lead and took a majority of votes still in play, and he was declared the victor.

== Later life ==
After her defeat, Rogers and her husband moved to Edmonton. She disapproved of the Social Credit government's move to the right under new premier Ernest Manning, and joined the socialist CCF. Finkel considers this surprising, in light of her long-time devotion to the ideals of social credit, the role the CCF played in her 1940 election defeat, and his assessment that she "seemed more interested in monetary reform than in the general social critique put forward by the CCF." She served as a member of the CCF's Edmonton membership and organization committee.

Rogers was elected to the board of Edmonton Public Schools in the 1959 Edmonton election as a candidate of the left-leaning Civic Reform Association (CRA). When the CRA dissolved in advance of the 1961 election, she joined the newly formed Quality Education Council. She was re-elected in 1961, 1963, 1964, 1966, 1968, and 1971.

When the Quality Education Council dissolved, she ran as an independent in the 1971 election, and retained her seat one last time.

Retiring from politics after 20 years, she did not seek re-election in the 1974 election.

Edith Rogers Junior High School in Edmonton opened in 1975. It was named in her honour and she attended many school events there during her lifetime. She printed and gave a copy of her book History Made in Canada to each member of the first graduating class of that school.

She was also author of the book Pioneers of the West.

Edith Rogers died July 17, 1985. She was predeceased by her husband, William Rogers, who died November 7, 1968.

== Electoral record ==
1935 Alberta general election: Ponoka
Party	Candidate	Votes	%	±%
Social Credit	Edith Rogers	2,295	59.30%	–
United Farmers	John Edward Brownlee	879	22.71%	–
Liberal	Robert McLaren	696	17.98%	–
Total		3,870	–	–
Rejected, spoiled and declined		N/A	–	–
Eligible electors / turnout		4,559	84.89%	–
Social Credit gain from United Farmers		Swing		N/A
Source(s) Source: "Ponoka Official Results 1935 Alberta general election". Alberta Heritage Community Foundation.

1940 Alberta general election: Ponoka
Party	Candidate	Votes	%	±%
First count
Independent	Percy A. McKelvey	1,920	43.62%	–
Social Credit	Edith Rogers	1,907	43.32%	-15.98%
Co-operative Commonwealth	Charles Aldo Johnson	575	13.06%	–
Total		4,402	–	–
Ballot transfer results
Independent	Percy A. McKelvey	2,234	52.21%	–
Social Credit	Edith Rogers	2,045	47.79%	–
Total		4,279	–	–
Rejected, spoiled and declined		121	–	–
Eligible electors / turnout		6,053	74.72%	-10.17%
Independent gain from Social Credit		Swing		N/A
Source(s) Source: "Ponoka Official Results 1940 Alberta general election". Alberta Heritage Community Foundation.
