= Ethel Sylvia Wilson =

Canadian politician

Ethel Sybella Wilson

City of Edmonton Alderman
- In office October 15, 1952 – October 19, 1966

Member of the Legislative Assembly of Alberta
- In office June 18, 1959 – August 30, 1971
- Preceded by: New District
- Succeeded by: District Abolished
- Constituency: Edmonton North

Minister without Portfolio
- In office November 30, 1962 – September 10, 1971
- Premier: Ernest Manning; Harry Strom

Personal details
- Born: February 13, 1902 Sunnyside, Alberta
- Died: December 8, 1983 (aged 81)
- Party: Social Credit
- Spouse: David Wilson
- Occupation: Seamstress, labour activist and politician

Ethel Sybella Wilson (February 13, 1902 - December 8, 1983) was a labour activist and a politician from Alberta, Canada. She served on Edmonton City Council from 1952 to 1966 and as Social Credit Member of the Legislative Assembly of Alberta (MLA) from 1959 to 1971. She served as a cabinet minister in the Social Credit governments of Ernest Manning and Harry Strom from 1962 to 1971.

== Early life ==
Ethel Sybella Knight was born on February 13, 1902, on a farm just outside Sunnyside, Alberta. She took her post secondary education at Edmonton Business College. Wilson married David Wilson, with whom she had three children. The couple separated in 1937.

After separating from her husband, Wilson entered the work force as a seamstress for Burns Meats, where she worked until her retirement in 1962. During that time she was active in the labour movement, eventually becoming Secretary of the Edmonton Labor Council.

== Political career ==
=== Edmonton City Council ===
In 1951, Wilson was nominated by the Edmonton Labor Council to run for a seat to Edmonton City Council in the municipal election. She was defeated, finishing tenth among thirteen candidates. She ran again the following year and was elected, taking fifth place.

Wilson was re-elected in 1954, 1956, 1958, 1960, 1962 and 1964. She retired from council in 1966.

=== Alberta Legislature ===
While still a member of Edmonton city council, Wilson ran for a seat in the Alberta Legislature in the 1959 general election. She ran as a Social Credit candidate in the new electoral district of Edmonton North, which she won over three other candidates.

She continued to hold her seat on Edmonton council while she served as an MLA. She would represent Edmonton-North in the Legislature until 1971.

On November 30, 1962, Wilson was appointed to the cabinet as a Minister without portfolio by Premier Ernest Manning. The appointment made her the second woman in the history of Alberta to be appointed to cabinet (following UFA's Irene Parlby). She was also the first trade unionist since Alex Ross (1917-1926) to sit in a provincial cabinet.

In the 1963 general election she was re-elected with some reduction in popular support.

Shortly after the 1963 election, Wilson pushed for movement on the Daylight Saving Time front. Alberta's urban municipalities were in favour of daylight saving time and pressured the provincial government to either hold a plebiscite on the question or allow municipalities to locally observe daylight saving time. A joint motion of Calgary City Council and Edmonton City Council for a plebiscite was put to the Legislature in July 1963, with the support of Wilson, who was both a Social Credit cabinet minister and an Edmonton alderman, but without success.

In the 1967 Alberta general election, Wilson defeated three candidates, including future NDP MLA Gordon Wright, She received 38 percent of the votes cast in Edmonton-North.

In 1971 Wilson's constituency of Edmonton North was abolished during redistribution, and she ran for re-election that year in the new electoral district of Edmonton-Kingsway. She was defeated by Progressive Conservative candidate Kenneth Paproski who was part of the P-C wave that took power that year.
