= George Prudham =

Canadian politician

The Hon. George Prudham

Member of the Canadian Parliament for Edmonton West
- In office 1949–1957
- Preceded by: James Angus MacKinnon
- Succeeded by: Marcel Lambert

Personal details
- Born: February 27, 1904 Kilbride, Ontario, Canada
- Died: August 24, 1974 (aged 70)
- Party: Liberal
- Spouse: Alethea Vivian Griggs
- Children: 2
- Occupation: Carpenter, contractor
- Cabinet: Minister of Mines and Technical Surveys (1950–1957)
- Portfolio: Parliamentary Assistant to the Minister of Resources and Development (1950)

William George Prudham, PC (February 27, 1904 – August 24, 1974) was a Canadian politician.

Born in Kilbride (now Burlington), Ontario, he moved to Alberta as a young man and was elected to the House of Commons of Canada representing the riding of Edmonton West in the 1949 federal election. A Liberal, he was re-elected in 1953. In 1950, he was the Parliamentary Assistant to the Minister of Resources and Development. From 1950 to 1957, he served as the Minister of Mines and Technical Surveys in the ministry led by Prime Minister Louis St. Laurent. He did not seek re-election in 1957. After he stepped down from federal politics, Prudham served as an alderman on Edmonton City Council from 1959 to 1963.
