= Frederick John Mitchell =

Canadian politician

25th Mayor of Edmonton
- In office September 1959 – October 14, 1959
- Preceded by: William Hawrelak
- Succeeded by: Elmer Ernest Roper

Alderman on the Edmonton City Council
- In office November 13, 1940 – September 1959
- In office October 14, 1959 – October 14, 1964

Personal details
- Born: December 4, 1893 Stratford, Ontario
- Died: December 25, 1979 (aged 86) Edmonton, Alberta
- Party: Citizens Committee, Civic Government Association
- Other political affiliations: Conservative Party of Alberta
- Spouse: Adele Louise Philip
- Children: One son, one daughter
- Profession: Accountant

Frederick John Mitchell (December 4, 1893 – December 25, 1979) was a politician in Alberta, Canada, a mayor of Edmonton, and a candidate for election to the Legislative Assembly of Alberta.

== Early life ==
Fred Mitchell was born December 4, 1893, in Stratford, Ontario, but had his early education in Elmira. He attended the Berlin Collegiate and Technical Institute, and took up employment with the Elmira Furniture Co. Ltd. upon graduation. He later joined the Metropolitan Bank in Elmira as a stenographer before becoming a registered industrial accountant.

In this capacity, he moved to Leross, Saskatchewan in 1913 to work for the Dominion Bank. He remained there until going overseas to serve in World War I. Upon his return, he moved to Edmonton and joined the staff of the G T P Railway. He subsequently joined Oliphant-Munson Collieries (later renamed Sterling Collieries Co. Ltd.) in Edmonton, where he was in charge of copper and gold prospecting for thirty years. He married Adele Louise Philip on August 1, 1922; the couple had a son and a daughter.

Mitchell was an exceptional tennis player, and was a provincial singles champion in 1920.

== Political career ==
Mitchell first sought political office in Edmonton's 1940 municipal election, when he ran for alderman on Edmonton City Council. He finished sixth of eighteen candidates, and was elected to a two-year term. He was re-elected ten times: in 1942 (when he placed fifth of twelve candidates), 1944 (fifth of twelve), 1946 (sixth of thirteen), 1948 (second of twelve), 1950 (fourth of twelve), 1952 (third of eight), 1954 (third of eighteen), 1956 (first of nine), 1960 (first of eighteen), and 1962 (first of thirteen). He retired from politics in 1964 without ever having lost a municipal election; in fact, the only break in his twenty-four years as alderman took place from September to October 1959 when he was appointed mayor by city council to replace William Hawrelak, who had resigned. In October, Elmer Ernest Roper was elected mayor, and Mitchell (who had not run) resumed the interrupted aldermanic term to which he had been elected in 1958. This incident makes Mitchell both the shortest-serving mayor in Edmonton's history and the only one never to have run for the position (while neither Cornelius Gallagher nor Terry Cavanagh were ever elected mayor, both ran unsuccessfully at some point in their respective careers). At the time of his retirement, he was the longest serving alderman in Edmonton's history, although both Ed Leger and Ron Hayter have since surpassed him.

Mitchell was less successful in his forays into provincial politics. He belonged to the Conservative Party of Alberta, which was a marginal force during Mitchell's involvement in the early 1950s. He ran for the party in the riding of Edmonton during the 1952 provincial election, but finished twenty-fourth out of twenty-nine candidates on the first ballot (the riding used a single transferable vote electoral system at the time) and was not elected. He fared only slightly better in his second and final attempt in the 1955 provincial election, when he finished twenty-third out of thirty candidates in the same riding.

== Personal life, death, and legacy ==
After his retirement, Mitchell continued to live in the Edmonton home he had purchased in 1936 for $650. He served on the city's development appeal board, and was a lifetime member of the Canadian Institute of Mining and Metallurgy. At the age of 84, he quit playing badminton in order to concentrate on tennis.

Frederick John Mitchell died on Christmas Day, 1979. Mitchell Industrial, an Edmonton neighbourhood, is named in his honour.

== Controversies ==
He was involved in Roebuck’s Bill 89, the Hydro-Electric Power Commission Act, 1935, which was designed to repudiate hydroelectricity contracts signed by the Conservative government with four Quebec companies.

Political offices
Preceded by William Hawrelak	Mayor of Edmonton; 1959	Succeeded by Elmer Ernest Roper
