= Civic Government Association =

Municipal political party in Canada

The Civic Government Association was a political party active in Edmonton's municipal politics from after the First World War until the 1960s. The party focused on the economic growth and government efficiency aspects of the Progressive Era, as it was envisioned by the 1920s. It first contested the 1919 election, and continued until the 1963 election. Its supporters ran under a variety of names: Civic Government Association, Citizens' Progressive League, Citizens' League or Citizens' Committee.
