= Timeline of Alberta history =

History of Alberta

Below is a brief timeline covering the history of the province of Alberta and its history pre-1905.

== Pre-history ==
Date	Event	Reference
c. 8000 BC	Indigenous hunters killing bison at Head-Smashed-in-Buffalo-Jump, archaeology indicates. Continues in use until 1800s.	

== Pre-Confederation ==
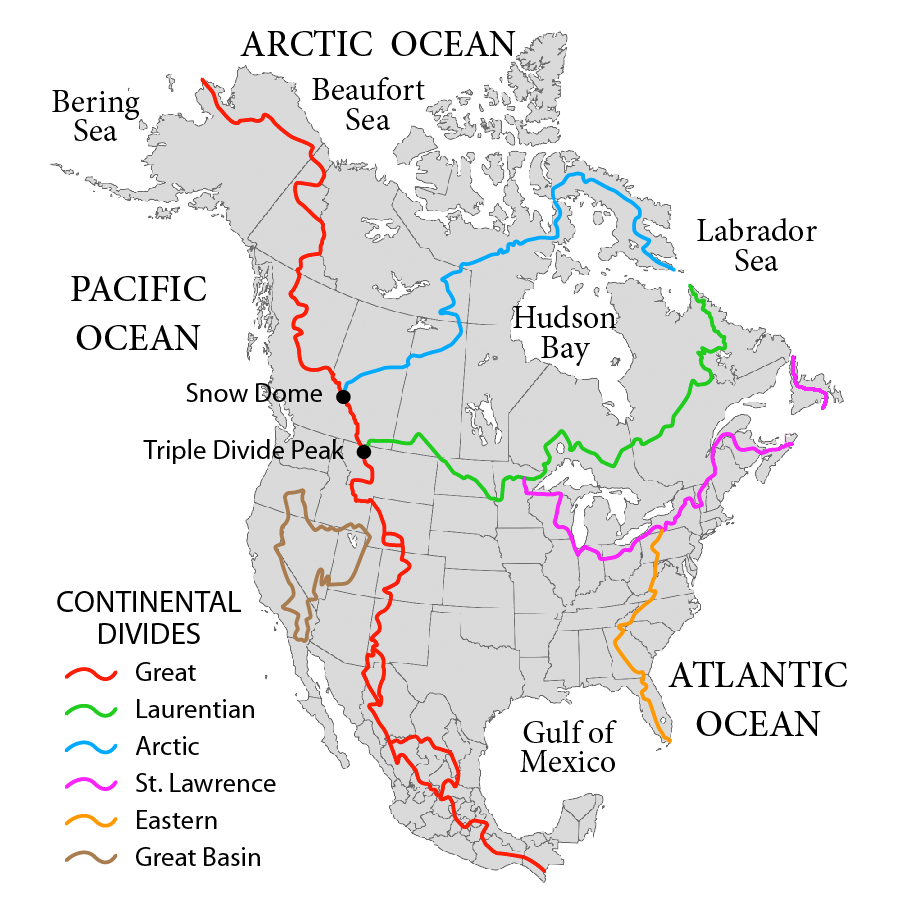
The watersheds of North America played important roles in the determination of political boundaries established across North America, including Alberta. The waterways in each served as important conduits for early explorers. The divides forced portages across the divides. Edmonton is along the northern-most major river of Hudson Bay's drainage at this longitude, close to the Arctic Divide, giving rise to its role as "Gateway to the North."

Date	Event	Reference
May 2, 1670	King Charles II of England grants the Hudson's Bay Company (HBC) a royal charter for "the sole Trade and Commerce of all those Seas, Streights, Bays, Rivers, Lakes, Creeks, and Sounds, in whatsoever Latitude they shall be, that lie within the entrance of the Streights commonly called Hudson's Streights... which are not now actually possessed by any of our Subjects, or by the Subjects of any other Christian Prince or State... and that the said Land be from henceforth... called Rupert's Land". Rupert's Land included part of today's Alberta. (The Milk river valley in the extreme south of the province and the north half of the province were not part of the Hudsons Bay watershed, draining into the Gulf of Mexico and the Arctic Ocean respectively.)	
1715	Cree leader Swan ("Captain Swan"), visiting York Fort, reports the existence of "gum or pitch" in the region now known as the Athabasca oil sands. His report, noted in the papers of the fort, is the first known mention of the oil sands.	
1730	Horses first appear in Alberta, coming in from present-day U.S. Horse stealing joins taking of a scalp and counting coup as way to gain honor. The use of horses in hunting, alongside the adoption of firearms about the same time, shifts the age-old balance between human hunters/predators and prey animals such as buffalo.	
September 11, 1754?	Anthony Henday, believed to be the first European to explore the area, enters present day Alberta. Although the route of his journey is uncertain, his trip was significant as he ruled out the possibility of the existence of a great Inland sea west of Winnipeg that would serve as a Northwest Passage to the Orient. He also reported the presence of friendly self-governing horse-riding Natives and huge herds of bison, and opened the way for others.	
1778	Peter Pond and Alexander Mackenzie establish the first fur trading post in Alberta, Pond House near Lake Athabasca. They are working for a group that forms the North West Company a short time later. Pond submits a map of the area to the United States Congress and Lt. Governor of Quebec in 1785. Mackenzie records the presence of "bituminous" substances along the Athabasca River.	
July 3, 1789	Alexander Mackenzie embarks from Fort Chipewyan on his 1789 expedition to the Arctic Ocean .	
July 1793	Alexander Mackenzie embarks from Fort Chipewyan, crosses present-day Alberta and BC, and achieves the first transcontinental journey across Canada (and of North America) by arriving at tidewater at Dean Channel.	
February 12, 1793	Peter Fidler reports coal deposits on the banks of Kneehills Creek, near the Red Deer River, north of present-day Drumheller. Fidler is the first known to mention coal deposits on the Prairies.	
1795	HBC establishes Fort Edmonton as a fur trading post at the present site of Fort Saskatchewan, at mouth of Sturgeon River on the North Saskatchewan River, as part of the Saskatchewan River fur trade. (Prior to 1812, it moves to what is now Rossdale and to a location near Smoky Lake.)	
1799	HBC establishes Rocky Mountain House as a trading post; the North West Company establishes Acton House nearby. David Thompson uses Acton House as base for explorations of the Rocky Mountains. It is also used as transshipment point for supplies to new NWC forts in BC.	
December 20, 1803	Mississippi drainage lands lying within present day Alberta are transferred from France to the United States when the Louisiana Purchase, which was signed on April 30, 1803, comes into effect.	
1810	Yellowhead Pass is explored by fur-trading companies, assisted by local Natives. 1813 NWC Jasper House is established on Brule Lake. The route becomes well used to access furs in interior BC. The lowest of the passes through the Canadian Rockies, it is used as the route of the CNR and the Yellowhead Highway today.	
1811	Peigan imposes a blockade on the North Saskatchewan preventing NWCo canoe brigade from using Howse Pass to deliver to NWCo forts in BC. David Thompson discovers another way through mountains - Athabasca Pass. Athabasca Pass becomes well used by the NWCo and the HBC's York Factory Express.	
October 10, 1812	HBC factor Jame Bird marks out the layout of Fort Edmonton IV. This marks the start of recorded permanent human occupancy on the site of present-day City of Edmonton.	
1821	HBC and North-West Company amalgamate. Many forts in Alberta are put out of operation.	
1823	HBC establishes Fort Assiniboine as a trans-shipment point on the Athabasca River, part of the Mackenzie River watershed flowing to the Arctic. Starting in 1824–25, it serves as the north end of a 130-kilometre (80 mi) horse track from Fort Edmonton. (see 1898)	
1830	Flood of North Saskatchewan River causes Fort Edmonton to be rebuilt up the hill near the present site of the Legislative Building. This fort contains the head office of the entire Saskatchewan district, as well as gateway to the Columbia district across the Rockies and the Arctic district to the North.	
October 18, 1840	Methodist missionary Robert Rundle arrives at Fort Edmonton as the first permanent cleric to the area.	
1862	Methodist missionary George McDougall and his missionary family settle on the north bank of North Saskatchewan at a place they call Victoria Settlement. HBC fur trading post Fort Victoria is built there in 1864. (Later the settlement of Pakan develops there.)	
December 4/5, 1865	Cree, Stoney and Ojibway fighters attack a Blackfoot tipi camp at Battle River. About a hundred Blackfoot dead or wounded, two children taken captive; the Cree side suffered about 60 dead or wounded.	
1866	George McDougall, missionary at Victoria Settlement, organizes theft of the Manitou Stone, or Manitou Asinîy ('Creator's Stone') from its ancient site near Hardisty. (see 2022)	

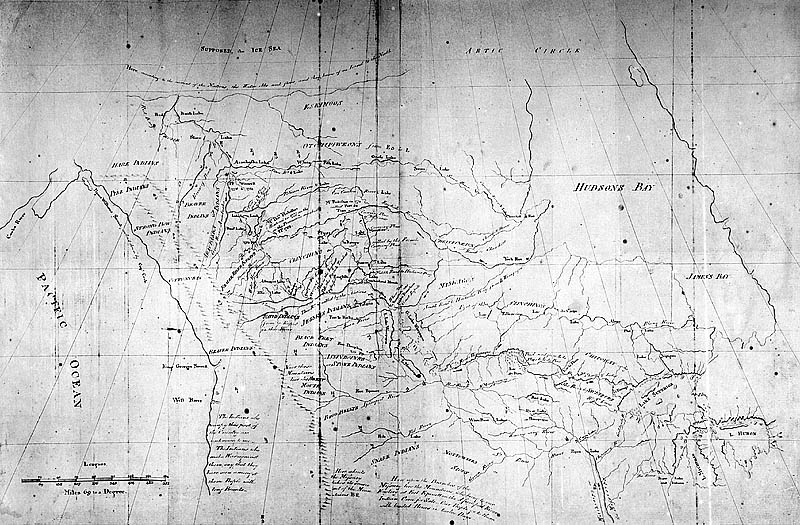
Copy of a map presented to the United States Congress and the Lt. Governor of Quebec by Peter Pond.

== Post-Confederation, in North-West Territories ==
Territorial evolution of the province of Alberta within Canada since Confederation, 1867

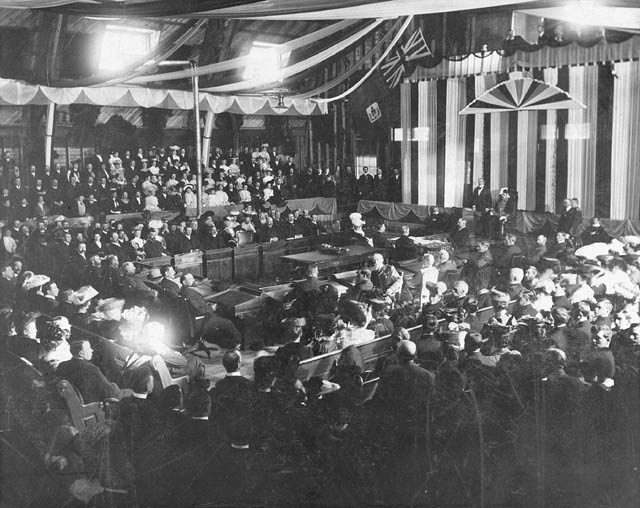
Alberta's first legislature, Edmonton, 1906

Date	Event	Reference
July 15, 1870	The Prairies and Great Northland become part of the young country of Canada, which had accomplished its Confederation in 1867. Rupert's Land and the North-Western Territory are combined under the new name of the North-West Territories, part of which will become the province of Alberta.	
October 25, 1870	Battle of the Belly River occurs. The battle is the last major conflict between the Cree (the Iron Confederacy) and the Blackfoot Confederacy, and the last major battle between First Nations on Canadian soil.	
September–October 1870	Hunters and their families left from Fort Edmonton and St. Albert to hunt buffalo in the Battle River area. Smallpox broke out, and over a two-month period, 122 persons died of it and were buried near Camrose. Smallpox also ravages the Victoria Settlement.	
October 1, 1874	First North-West Mounted Police outpost in Alberta at Fort Macleod is established. (The police force was legally established in 1873 in response to the Cypress Hills Massacre of 1873 It was staffed and put into the field in 1874.)	
Spring 1875	Mounties establish a post at Fort Saskatchewan, outside Edmonton. This location is thought to be on the route of the transcontinental railway (CPR) expected to be built a few years later. But instead the route selected is through southern Alberta. (Fort Saskatchewan goes on to be a city 1985.)	
September 1875	NWMP officer Éphrem-A. Brisebois establishes Fort Brisebois, at present site of Calgary. James Macleod renames it Fort Calgary in 1876.	
August 23, 1876	Treaty 6 receives its first signatories, ceding much of north-central Alberta to the Crown. Treaty 6 land stretched from the Red Deer River to the Athabasca River.	
1876	Athabasca Landing: the Hudson's Bay Company (HBC) built a warehouse to facilitate its supply route to Lesser Slave Lake, eventually replacing Fort Assiniboine as the most-important trans-shipment place on the Athabasca River, to access the Mackenzie river system. (Soon a trail between Athabasca and Edmonton, and more shipping facilities, were built. Settlement developed. 1904 name changed to just Athabasca.)	
September 22, 1877	Treaty 7 is signed between the Crown and Blackfoot people, led by Chief Crowfoot, ceding much of southern Alberta to the Crown and officially opening the territory to settlement.	
May 2, 1882	North-West Territories, which includes the land of today's province of Alberta, is divided into provisional districts, including districts Alberta, Athabasca, Saskatchewan and Assiniboia. But purpose of these districts queried at time as each is too small to be a future province and is too large to have just one NWT Assembly seat.	
October 13, 1882	Alexander Galt's company, the North Western Coal and Navigation Company, opens its first drift mine. The community of Coalbanks, later named Lethbridge, establishes itself around the mine.	
1883	Canadian Pacific Railway (CPR) construction enters Alberta in early May. Line reaches Calgary, on August 10. CPR establishes new townsite west of Elbow River. The old Calgary settlement moves to the new site.	
1883	CPR employees drilling for water at Langevin Siding (later renamed Carlstadt and later Alderson) discover natural gas.	
May 26, 1883	Edmonton elects its first member of the North-West Territorial Council—Frank Oliver	
June 28, 1884	Calgary elects its first member of the North-West Territorial Council—James Davidson Geddes	
November 27, 1884	Calgary is incorporated as a town. This is accomplished due to lobbying by an elected "Civic Committee", initiated by James Reilly. The first Civic Committee includes Major James Walker and James Murdoch. (Murdoch is elected Calgary's first mayor in December 1884.)	
April 1885	Frog Lake Massacre occurs as the North-West Rebellion stretches into modern day Alberta. Cree discontents belonging to Big Bear's band kill nine white officials, instructors and priests living in the small settlement of Frog Lake (at the time in the District of Saskatchewan). Several of the perpetrators later are hanged. Edmonton under threat of First Nations uprising. The Alberta Field Force marched north on the Calgary and Edmonton Trail, building Fort Normandeau at the Red Deer River ford and then saving Edmonton from the threat. The AFF then proceeded down the North Saskatchewan River to the scene of fighting in Saskatchewan.	
June 23, 1887	Rocky Mountains Park (later renamed Banff National Park), is created by the Rocky Mountains Park Act.	
February 22, 1887	District of Alberta elects its first MP, former whisky pedlar Donald Watson Davis.	
1888	Richard Hardisty is appointed Senator for District of Alberta. Served to his death a short time later on October 15, 1889. (Replaced by James Lougheed.)	
1891	Calgary and Edmonton Railway is completed, connecting Calgary to the south bank of North Saskatchewan River, opposite Edmonton. South Edmonton (later named Strathcona) grows up at the rail-head, the northern-most railway line in North America at the time.	
1892	Edmonton is incorporated as a town. Town council is elected. Matthew McCauley elected mayor by acclamation. Soon after taking that position, he and others took up arms in the short-lived Rat Creek Rebellion.	
1892	Calgary is site of anti-Chinese riot, with up to 200 city residents wrecking Chinese laundries and other businesses.	
January 1, 1894	Calgary, formerly a town, is incorporated as a city. A city council is elected.	
March 22, 1895	Mass meeting held at Calgary to discuss possibility of pressuring the federal government to establish the district of Alberta as a province. The result of the meeting was the formation of a Provisional Committee authorized to "take steps towards the organization of a representative League for the advancement of the movement." A booklet was published to explain the position - "Provincial government for Alberta, its meaning and necessity".	
1897	Klondike Gold Rush occurs. Many use Calgary and Edmonton Railway and the South Edmonton railway station on way to goldfields, still thousands of kilometres to the northwest.	
November 7, 1898	Thomas Chalmers begins construction of the Klondike Trail on behalf of the North-West Territorial government. He extends the Edmonton–Fort Assiniboine trail to Lesser Slave Lake. Many who attempt to trek overland to the Yukon Gold Rush use this trail.	
June 21, 1899	Treaty 8 is signed, ceding much of Northern Alberta to the Crown.	
1899	South Edmonton is incorporated as Town of Strathcona, named after Lord Strathcona, kingpin in both the Hudson's Bay Company and the CPR.	
1900	Edmonton's Low Level Bridge built. The first bridge across the uppper North Saskatchewan River. Carries the Edmonton, Yukon and Pacific Railway to Edmonton in 1902.	
April 29, 1903	Frank Slide, Canada's deadliest rockslide, destroys part of the town of Frank. Kills 70 to 90 or more.	
November 7, 1904	Edmonton incorporates as a city. A city council is elected.	

== Provincehood 1905–1945 ==
Territorial evolution of the province of Alberta within Canada since Confederation, 1867

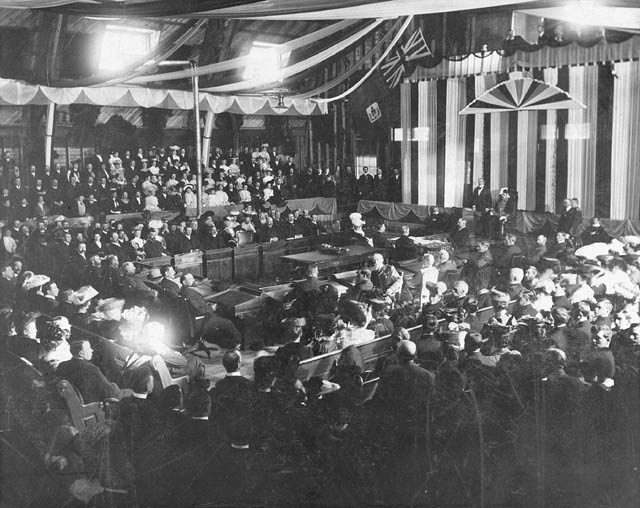
Alberta's first legislature, Edmonton, 1906

Date	Event	Reference
September 1, 1905	Federal government's Alberta Act creates Alberta as a province separate from the North-West Territories. The whole district of Alberta, and parts of the districts of Assiniboine, Saskatchewan and Athabasca, all formerly parts of the NWT, combine to make the new province.	
November 9, 1905	1st Alberta general election. The Alberta Liberal Party is elected government with majority of the votes. Three Conservative MLAs also elected.	
1906	Edmonton is confirmed as capital city of province. The Legislative Assembly holding its sessions in the McKay Avenue School, until 1912.	"From the Press Gallery" Saturday News, April 28, 1906, p. 3
May 9, 1906	Lethbridge, Medicine Hat and Wetaskiwin declared cities.	
1907	Strathcona incorporates as a city.	
June 8, 1907	Strathcona coal mine disaster: six are killed. It is the worst industrial disaster in Edmonton's history.	
1906–1911	Canadian Northern Railway and Grand Trunk Pacific Railway built through Edmonton and Jasper National Park. (The railways later were combined to form the Canadian National Railway (CN).)	
1908	A collision between two trains at Dunmore, just outside Medicine Hat, killed most of both crews and seven passengers, eleven in all. The circumstances of the crash were spooky as both train engineers had witnessed a ghost train colliding with their trains at the location over the previous week.	
January 8, 1909	Alberta's first Labour MLA, Donald McNabb, elected in Lethbridge City by-election. (He lost his seat in general election later this same year.)	
March 22, 1909	Alberta's first Socialist Party MLA, Charles M. O'Brien, elected in the Rocky Mountain district. (He lost his seat in the 1913 general election.) Independent MLAs also elected as the two-party system already loses adherence.	
December 10, 1910	Bellevue coal mine disaster, Crowsnest Pass. 30 dead	
January 11, 1911	Lowest temperature ever recorded in Alberta, −61.2 °C at Fort Vermilion.	
September 3, 1912	Alberta Legislature Building opens. Governor General of Canada, Prince Arthur, Duke of Connaught and Strathearn, cuts the ribbon.	
1912	The cities of Edmonton and Strathcona amalgamate.	
1912–1913	start of economic crash. (Edmonton's population did not grow substantially again until 1940s.)	
March 25, 1913	Red Deer declared a city.	
May 14, 1914	A.W. Dingman strikes wet natural gas at Turner Valley. This produced gasoline. The Turner Valley/Black Diamond oilfield became a major supplier of oil and gas and the largest producer in the British Empire.	
June 19, 1914	Hillcrest mine disaster, Canada's deadliest coal mining accident and deadliest industrial disaster, kills 189 workers, at Crowsnest Pass.	
July 21, 1915	1915 Alberta liquor plebiscite held, forced by law allowing citizen-initiated legislation. (This is the only referendum caused by a citizen-initiative law until 2026.) 61% vote in favour of Prohibition. Prohibition (ban on sale of alcohol) goes into effect on July 1, 1916.	
April 19, 1916	Women's suffrage movement prevails in Alberta, women earn the right to vote, with the passage of the Equal Suffrage Statutory Law Amendment Act. Alberta is the third province to grant the right.	
March 1, 1917	Alberta Provincial Police take over policing in Alberta. RCMP were out until 1932.	
1917	4th Alberta general election Louise McKinney and Roberta MacAdams elected to the Alberta Legislature, the first women elected to a legislature in the British Empire. McKinney and James Weir were elected under the label of the leftist Non-Partisan League. MacAdams and Robert Pearson were elected as representatives of Albertans serving in WWI.	
June 19–20, 1918	Murder of six farmers at Grande Prairie—Joseph and Stanley Snyder at 35-71-6-W6; Ignacius Patan and three others at 8-72-3-W6. Coroner Percy H. Belcher (former APP officer) investigated but was unable to determine the identity of the murderer or murderers.	
1918	Vermilion suffers devastation of its main business strip. 38 businesses and business buildings destroyed in massive blaze.	
October 1918	Spanish Influenza. Oct. 2 Alberta Board of Public Health order all citizens to be masked in public and theatres close. Around 4,700 Albertans die; more than 31,000 Albertans taken sick.	
1918–1922, especially 1919	Great Labour Revolt General strikes in Edmonton, Calgary and more. One Big Union is founded in Calgary. Workers at all but one of Alberta coal mines are on strike in 1919.	
1919	Lac la Biche forest fire killed 11.	
August 2, 1920	Train robbery at Crowsnest Pass by Jimmy Attin (alias Tom Basoff), Frank Allen (alias George Arkoff), Alex Godzees (alias Ausby Auloff). Basoff and Arkoff cornered in a cafe at Bellevue five days later. Basoff shot his way out but left Arkoff and Constable Bailey (Alberta Provincial Police) and Corporal Usher (RCMP) dead behind him. Four days later Basoff was captured at Pincher Creek; hanged on Dec. 22. Auloff was arrested at Butte, Montana in 1924 and sentenced to seven years in prison.	
July 18, 1921	5th Alberta general election the United Farmers of Alberta win election to government, electing 38 of the 61 members of the Legislature. Four Labour MLAs were elected, two in Calgary. The UFA government would hold power until 1935.	
December 6, 1921	1921 Canadian election the United Farmers of Alberta took ten of Alberta's 12 federal seats. Two Labour MPs are elected in Calgary to take the other two Alberta seats - William Irvine and Joseph Shaw.	
August 29, 1922	Robbery of Union Bank, Foremost. Inspector E.W. Bavin (Alberta Provincial Police) helped track down the criminals, recovered more than $800,000 in stolen bonds, and broke up the entire bank robbery network.	
1922	Alberta Provincial Police constable Steve Lawson shot to death on streets of Coleman. Bootlegger Emilio Picariello and his friend, Florence Lassandro, were hanged in 1923 for the crime.	
1923	Home Bank of Canada failed. 60,000 Albertan farmers and others lost their savings. In Blairmore alone, 500 deposits amounting to $190,000 were lost, many belonging to working people and widows. The Blairmore school district lost $10,000 and feared it would have to suspend operations. Calgary Labour MP William Irvine prodded the Canadian government to bring in tighter bank regulations (and no further banks failed until the 1980s). The federal government eventually paid $5.4M to cover a portion of the lost Home Bank deposits.	
November 5, 1923	1923 Alberta prohibition plebiscite, on the cancellation of prohibition. 58% vote in favour of clause (d), ending Prohibition and enabling government sale of liquor and private operation of beerhalls. Prohibition had been in effect since 1916, following the 1915 Prohibition plebiscite.	
1924	Alberta adopts proportional representation in the cities and instant-runoff voting elsewhere, the first province in Canada to elect all its MLAs using non-plurality systems. (The STV/IRV hybrid system is in use until 1956.)	
June 16, 1926	The City of Edmonton receives a licence to operate airport, later named Blatchford Field, the first municipal airport in Canada.	
June 28, 1926	Provincial election. UFA government re-elected. Single transferable voting used in Edmonton and Calgary. A UFA MLA and Labour MLA elected in Edmonton for first time. Also, Liberal and Conservative MLAs elected in Edmonton. Liberal, Conservative and Labour MLAs elected in Calgary.	
July 9, 1928	Vernon Booher shot and killed four people, including his mother and brother, in Mannville, Alberta. A mind-reader identified Booher as the perpetrator and announced where he had hidden his rifle. He was hanged for the crime in 1929 at Fort Saskatchewan.	
December 14, 1929	Alberta Natural Resources Act transfers control of Alberta's natural resources and Crown land to the province.	
1930	McGillivray mine, at Coleman suffered explosion. Ten were killed	
1929–1939	Great Depression. Massive unemployment. Prices plummet for agricultural products and manufactured goods. Southern Alberta suffers from drought as well.	
1932	Co-operative Commonwealth Federation (Farmer-Labour-Socialist) party, a predecessor of the NDP, founded in Calgary	
1932	RCMP resumed policing in Alberta, as Alberta Provincial Police are disbanded.	
December 20, 1932	Edmonton Hunger March. A demonstration by struggling workers and farmers is repressed by billyclub-wielding police, some on horseback. Subsequently, police raid the Hunger March headquarters. 27 leaders and activists arrested.	
1933	League of Indians of Alberta (LIA) founded by Cree and Stoney leaders from central Alberta. Later it became the Indian Association of Alberta	
1933	Blairmore elects a town council of socialist activists. Is re-elected in 1934 and 1935.	
1933 –	July 2, 1934 Brownlee sex scandal captures widespread attention, resulting in the premier's resignation. He is replaced by Richard Reid.	
February 1935	The Alberta Health Insurance Act was an act passed by the Alberta Legislature in the last months of the United Farmers of Alberta government. It was the first provincial or federal health insurance law to provide some public funding for medical services. (Stopped by change of government).	
August 22, 1935	8th Alberta general election. Alberta Social Credit League, led by William Aberhart, wins a majority of seats in the Legislature — ending 15 years of the United Farmers of Alberta hold on majority power in the Legislature. The Social Credit government would hold power until 1971.	
October 5–8, 1935	String of murders from Saskatchewan to Banff committed by three Doukhobor farmers - John Kalmakoff, Joseph Posnikoff and Peter Woiken, suspected of a bank robbery. Constable William Wainwright and RCMP Constable John Shaw were killed near Pelly, Saskatchewan; Sergeant Thomas Seller Wallace and George "Scotty" Harrison were shot to death near Banff. Police shot to death the three perpetrators.	
December 9, 1935	Coalhurst coal mine explosion kills 16, almost an entire shift of underground miners. (Coalhurst is located about 15 kilometres north of Lethbridge.)	
April 1, 1936	Alberta became the first and only Canadian province to default on its bond payments. The province failed to redeem two bond issues totaling $3,200,000. (The bonds were eventually honored once the province's economy improved in the 1940s.)	
1937	Lieutenant Governor John C. Bowen refused to give royal assent to three pieces of legislation passed by the Social Credit government. Two of the bills would have imposed provincial government control over private banks operating in Alberta. The Accurate News and Information Act would have forced newspapers to print government rebuttals to stories the provincial cabinet deemed "inaccurate". The three bills were later declared unconstitutional (ultra vires) by the Supreme Court of Canada and the Judicial Committee of the Privy Council due to limits on the powers of provincial governments. The government's debt moratoriums intended to save homes and farms from foreclosure, were overturned by the federal government and the courts.	
1938	Alberta Treasury Branches established as a provincially owned bank, as part of the Social Credit government's monetary reform policies.	
1938	Metis Population Betterment Act is passed into law by Aberhart's Social Credit government. Lands are set aside for Metis Settlement Associations, establishing Metis settlements at Buffalo Lake, Cold Lake, East Prairie, Elizabeth, Fishing Lake, Gift Lake, and other places. James P. Brady and Malcolm Norris were prominent in the process	
April 1938	the Government of Alberta enacted An Act for the Conservation of Oil and Gas Resources of the Province of Alberta. Assented to April 8, 1938. This law stopped the flagrant flaring off of natural gas in the Turner Valley oilfield. It is said you could read a newspaper at night in Calgary by the light of the flares. (The United Farmers government's attempt to regulate such through the Turner Valley Gas Conservation Act of 1932 had been ineffectual.) Premier Aberhart's own constituents in Turner Valley moved to recall him as their MLA but the government repealed the recall law.	
1939	Indian Association of Alberta founded by John Callihoo and John Laurie, based on the League of Indians of Alberta.	
1939–1945	Alberta plays a role in the Canadian WWII effort. This includes participation in the Commonwealth Air Training Plan, Edmonton being a base and administrative headquarters for construction of the Alaska Highway, and hundreds of planes being ferried through Alberta on their way to aid the Soviet Union's war effort.	
1941	Brazeau Collieries Mine explosion killed 29 at Rocky Mountain House.	

== Post World War II ==
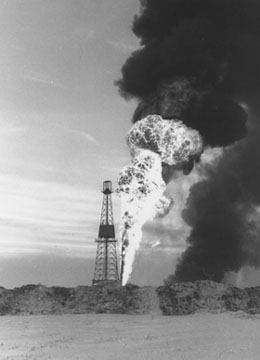
Leduc No. 1 well

Date	Event	Reference
February 13, 1947	Leduc No. 1 strikes oil. it is the first major oil discovery in northern Alberta, growing the petroleum industry in Alberta.	
1940s-1950s	Many coal mines close up after railways switch to diesel and oil found at Leduc. (The continuing move to clean technology impacts coal mining—the last coal power plant in Alberta closes in 2024).	
1950	Chinchaga fire in northwestern Alberta and parts of BC burned an estimated 1,700,000 hectares (4,200,000 acres) of boreal forest. The Chinchaga fire produced large amounts of smoke, creating the "Great Smoke Pall", observed across eastern North America and Europe. Much of the province of Ontario experienced heavy smoke that caused pitch darkness during daytime hours.	
1950	Leduc Hotel explosion killed 10.	
1955	Camrose declared a city.	
June 3, 1956	Stettler MLA John Etter Clark killed his family and others, and then himself. Total of eight died. (Clark's murders, the Cook Family murders of 1959, and Phu Lang's murders in 2014 are the deadliest in Alberta's history.)	
1958	James Gladstone of the Kainai Nation, appointed to Senate. He was the first First Nations person (person of Treaty status) to serve in the Senate.	
1959	Robert Raymond Cook killed seven members of his family at Stettler.	
November 29, 1960	A train struck a school bus carrying students from Chipman to a school in Lamont. Seventeen students (15 girls and two boys) killed.	
July 1, 1969	Alberta instituted the Alberta Health Care Insurance Plan (AHCIP), joining the national universal medicare program. (The federal government had passed the Medical Care Act in 1966 to cover doctor visits, but Alberta premier Ernest Manning had opposed Alberta joining. He eventually relented and signed on in 1969. Alberta began charging residents a healthcare premium, finally scrapped in 2009.)	
1971	17th Alberta general election. The Progressive Conservatives win a majority, led by Peter Lougheed — ending 36 years of the Social Credit government's hold on majority power in the Legislature. The Progressive Conservative government would hold power until 2015.	
May 19, 1976	Alberta Heritage Savings Trust Fund is created, after Alberta Heritage Savings Trust Fund Act receives royal assent. The Heritage fund is the only sovereign wealth fund in Canada.	
October 28, 1980	National Energy Program. Pierre Trudeau's government announces the NEP, arousing anger and resentment in the West. It is set to take effect on January 1, 1981.	
September 15, 1981	West Edmonton Mall, at the time the world's largest, opens.	
February 1983	Fort Saskatchewan held a plebiscite on becoming a city. 78% of voters said no. (In 1985, sentiment had changed, and Fort Saskatchewan, led by Mayor Muriel Abdurahman, became a city.)	
October 19, 1984	NDP leader Grant Notley and five others are killed when Wapiti Aviation Flight 402 crashes in snow and trees southeast of Grande Prairie.	
September 25, 1985	Royal Tyrell Museum of Palaeontology opens.	
1985	Mid-air collision at CFB Edmonton killed 10.	
February 8, 1986	The Hinton train disaster kills 23 people, the deadliest railway accident in Alberta history.	
June 14, 1986	The Mindbender derails, killing three people	
July 31, 1987	The Edmonton tornado kills 27 people, injures more than 300, and destroys more than 300 homes and business buildings, in the Evergreen trailer park and elsewhere. It causes more than $330M in damage.	
February 13, 1988	1988 Winter Olympics open in Calgary with closing ceremonies on February 28.	
August 9, 1999	Hub Oil explosion, at a Calgary refinery, kills two workers. Likely deadliest industrial disaster in Calgary history. Series of three major explosions and many smaller ones. The Calgary Fire Department lost two truck units in the second explosion, and several firefighters sustained injuries. Approximately 300 nearby residents were evacuated for 20 hours.	

== 21st century ==
Date	Event	Reference
2000	Pine Lake tornado killed 12.	
2002	Alberta teachers strike. 21,000 either on strike or locked out, for three weeks in February. Government ordered them back to work, but that was overturned in legal appeal. Government passed Bill 12, banning teachers' strikes and putting in place an arbitration process that was considered unfair by the Alberta Teachers Association. Finally in April a new contract was achieved through a fair arbitration process, to teachers' relief. (First major teachers' strike since 1992. Next one in 2025).	
2009	Alberta stopped charging provincial health care premiums effective January 1. (The premiums, which had been charged since 1969, had been the same for everyone irrespective of the use of healthcare services and had been going into general revenue.)	
October 7, 2011	Alison Redford becomes first female premier of Alberta. She serves in that post to 2014.	
June 19, 2013	2013 Alberta floods damage parts of Calgary and other areas in south and central Alberta. Kills five. causes some of the worst flood damage in Alberta's history.	
May 5, 2015	29th Alberta general election gives the Alberta New Democratic Party, led by Rachel Notley, a majority of seats in the Legislature—ending 44 years of Progressive Conservative party rule.	
May 1, 2016	2016 Fort McMurray wildfire begins. It displaces more than 88,000 people from their homes.	
August 8, 2018	Sunwapta Falls head-on crash killed six. Near Jasper, on Highway 93, south of Sunwapta Falls. A two-year-old child was uninjured.	
December 2, 2018	Oil curtailments announced to take effect in January 2019, limiting production to 3.56 million barrels per day (566,000 m^{3}/d).	
April 16, 2019	30th Alberta general election occurs. The United Conservative Party win a majority of seats in the Legislature, displacing the Alberta NDP government after one term.	
January 1, 2019	Beaumont is incorporated as a city.	
December 2, 2019	A school bus carrying 14 children drove onto a highway at Smoky Lake and was hit by a truck. At least eight were injured.	
January 8, 2020	The shoot-down of Ukraine International Airlines Flight 752 in Iran kills 51 Canadians, including 13 Edmontonians, of whom 10 were faculty at the University of Alberta. This is believed to be the most Edmontonians killed in a single event since the 1987 tornado, and deadliest day in the history of the university.	
February 23, 2020	Teck Resources withdraws its application to build the Frontier Mine in northern Alberta despite having spent more than one billion dollars on the project over a ten year period.	
March 17, 2020	COVID-19 causes the government of Alberta to declare a state of emergency. The first person in Alberta dies from the virus on March 19. Kills almost 5000 Albertans.	
2021	Western North American heat wave Hottest weather was observed in Alberta from June 29 to July 1, when records were set in Grande Prairie (41.5 °C), Beaverlodge (40.5 °C), Fort McMurray (40.3 °C), Edmonton (37 °C), Calgary (36 °C), and other locations. It caused 66 deaths in Alberta.	
October 18, 2018	2021 Alberta referendum. Most votes are in favour of elimination of equalization payments from the Constitution of Canada, and in favour of retaining semi-annual clock changes instead of adopting daylight saving time year-round. (Despite these results, equalization program still in effect in 2026, and in 2026 Alberta switched to permanent daylight saving time (UTC−06:00 or Central Standard Time year-round).)	
September 30, 2022	On National Day for Truth and Reconciliation, the Alberta government and Manitou Asinîy-Iniskim-Tsa Xani Centre commit to returning the Manitou Stone (Creator Stone), a 145 kg meteorite, to its landing site near Hardisty, from where it had been removed in 1868. A $7.5 million–$10 million geodesic dome designed by Indigenous architect Douglas Cardinal, will be a prayer healing facility and shrine for the allegedly sacred stone. Former Poundmaker Chief Blaine Favel says land for the site and funding from corporate donors is being negotiated. The Royal Alberta Museum is to continue to curate the artifact until the site is constructed.	
March 19, 2023	Highway 88 collision between a truck and a van, in Northern Sunrise County, killed five—three members of the Whitefish Lake First Nation, travelling in the van, and both occupants of the truck.	
2024	Wildfire destroys a large portion of the Jasper townsite.	
June–July 2026	Record amount of rain lands on Edmonton and other north central Alberta locations.	
October 17, 2026	Wildfire at a training area at CFB Wainwright kills four and injures 39. Heaviest death toll of any peacetime disaster suffered by Canadian military.	
October 19, 2026	Alberta holds referendum on separation from Canada and other questions. More votes cast for remaining in Canada than to proceed to another referendum on separation.	
October 21, 2026	Grande Prairie starts to operate its own city police force, the Grande Prairie Police Service.	

== Other Alberta timelines ==
- 2019 Alberta general election timeline
- Alberta Heritage Savings timeline
- Timeline of the petroleum industry in Alberta
- Timeline of labour issues and events in Canada
- Timeline of Edmonton history
