= Timeline of Edmonton history =

Chronology of Canadian city

The timeline of Edmonton history is a chronology of significant events in the history of Edmonton, Alberta.

== Pre-European period ==
- Indigenous peoples roamed Alberta for thousands of years, or even tens of thousands of years. The rim of the river valley and its ravines and hilltops in Edmonton are known to have been well-used as campgrounds and look-out points during this time. Rabbit Hill, today's Mary Lobay Park, Mount Pleasant Cemetery and Huntington Heights (near Whitemud Drive west of Calgary Trail) are known to be sites of human activity for millennia. As well, the "Old North Trail" of the Blackfoot goes through present-day Edmonton, as it goes from Mexico to the Barren Lands up north. (Part of it survives is preserved as the Great Western Trail through the U.S.) At about Edmonton the Trail branched, with one branch going through present-day site of Ft. Assiniboine and toward western Arctic lands; the other branch going NE then breaking north to descend the Athabasca River. Some conjecture that the Trail's crossing of the North Saskatchewan River at the site is the reason for the siting of fur-trade posts in Rossdale.

== 18th century ==
- 1754 – Anthony Henday, an explorer working for the Hudson's Bay Company (HBC), may have been the first European to enter the Edmonton area.
- 1795 – As part of the westward extension of the Saskatchewan River fur trade, the North West Company established a trading post near today's Fort Saskatchewan, on the north bank of the river. That same year, the Hudson's Bay Company established Fort Edmonton nearby.

== 19th century ==
- 1802 – Fort Edmonton (Hudson's Bay Company) moves to Rossdale.
- 1810 – Fort Edmonton (Hudson's Bay Company) moves to a location near Smoky Lake.
- 1812 – Fort Edmonton (Hudson's Bay Company) moves to Rossdale, never again to move out of today's Edmonton. This is start of Edmonton's recorded permanent occupancy.
- 1821 the North West Company and the Hudson's Bay Company merge, and fur-trade activities at Edmonton are concentrated in Fort Edmonton.
- 1824 – Horse packtrail established to connect Fort Edmonton to HBC's Fort Assiniboine, which serves as trans-shipment point on the Athabasca River, part of the Mackenzie River watershed flowing to the Arctic.
- 1825 - The name "Horse Hill" first appears in the Edmonton House Journal on December 28, 1825. (Horse Hill and Horsehills Creek are place names in present-day Edmonton.)
- 1830 – Fort Edmonton moves up the hill, to near today's legislative building. From 1830 to 1860, the fur trade in western Canada uses Edmonton as a prominent transshipment point connecting the prairies with New Caledonia (interior BC) and with the fur trading posts up north. By 1860s ships are sailing from the Atlantic Ocean "around the Horn" to the west coast, and that more and more causes a decline in the importance of Edmonton as a transportation link.
- 1859-1860 – Gold rush in the Cariboo region of BC leads to gold-panners coming to Edmonton. Among them Thomas Clover, who founds settlement at Clover Bar. (Later dredges are used to mine gold from river bed.)
- 1870 – Fort Edmonton and the rest of the North-West Territories becomes part of Canada when the Dominion of Canada expands to take in the Hudson's Bay Company's Rupert's Land.
- 1871 – The first prominent buildings outside the walls of Fort Edmonton, a Methodist church mission building and manse, built by George McDougall and his family, formerly of Victoria Settlement. They add mix to the existing campsites and log cabins of gold prospectors, frontier farmers and hunters, Indigenous, European and Métis, who live in the bush where City of Edmonton sits today.
- 1874 – North-West Mounted Police makes Great March to western prairies. Second Patrol, a spin-off of the main March West, arrives in Edmonton in exhausted dribs and drabs Oct. 29-Nov. 2
- 1874 - William Bird operates gristmill at Mill Creek.
- 1875 – Arrival of Edmonton's first sternwheeler/steamboat Northcote.
- 1876
  - Donald Ross opens Edmonton's first hotel
  - Treaty 6 is signed by representatives of the Queen and local Native leaders. Title to the Edmonton region is ceded to the Crown, excepting promised Indian reserves of Enoch and Papaschase, in return for treaty obligations on the part of the Crown (and the Canadian government). (The Papaschase reserve, on the site of Mill Woods and Southgate mall, was never established.)
  - Athabasca Landing Trail opened up, replacing the road to Fort Assiniboine as the main route to the north country.
- 1878 – first post office opens
- 1879
  - Edmonton's first local exhibition, Agricultural Show and Fair.
  - Telegraph line is built to Edmonton.
- 1880 – Edmonton Bulletin begins publication. Frank Oliver, publisher
- 1881
  - First school built in Edmonton at a site near the current McKay Avenue School at 10425 – 99 Avenue.
- 1882
  - As new arrivals try to take up residence in Edmonton area where people are already living, a violent struggle arises between "old timers" and the new "squatters". Matthew McCauley is named to head a settlers rights protective association (in local parlance "a vigilance committee"). He and others throw a squatter's shack over the edge of the river valley.
  - Dominion Land Survey is conducted in Edmonton area. Fixes in place a mixture of riverlots along river and square sections elsewhere. It helps firm up local land ownership.
- 1883 – Edmonton, at the time an unincorporated hamlet, elects Frank Oliver as its first representative to the NWT Territorial Council.
- 1885 – Telephone service begins with just two telephones
- 1885 – North-West Rebellion and the simultaneous First Nations uprising, both centred in Saskatchewan, strikes fear in many in Edmonton. Alberta Field Force, led by Thomas Bland Strange, comes from Calgary, ensures local security (Edmonton Natives do not engage in open rebellion at this time). The AFF descends the North Saskatchewan to battle at Frenchmen's Butte and Loon Lake. (St. Albert is given its own seat in the NWT Territorial Council a few months later.)
- 1886 – Edmonton's coldest temperature is recorded, as −49.4 °C (−56.9 °F) January 19.
- 1891
  - Calgary and Edmonton Railway is completed from Calgary to the south bank of North Saskatchewan River, across from the Edmonton settlement.
  - Community of South Edmonton (Strathcona) is established south of the river at the end of steel of the Calgary and Edmonton Railway. (Became a town in 1899.)
- 1892
  - Edmonton incorporated as a town with a population of 700. Covered what is now downtown, north of the river.
  - Edmonton's first town election. Matt McCauley elected mayor. City-wide district used; all city councillors elected in one contest.
  - Rat Creek Rebellion – Mayor McCauley and an armed mob prevent transfer of Dominion land office to "South Edmonton" (Strathcona). The mob stands off a NWMP force that arrives to establish law and order. When tempers cool, a separate land office is established in South Edmonton. Edmonton hires its first constable.
  - Second McDougall Church is built at site of first church. (Now at Fort Edmonton Park)
- 1894 – Edmonton Police force founded.
- 1895 – Herbert Charles Wilson becomes Mayor of Edmonton (until 1896)
- 1896
  - Edmonton pioneer, newspaperman and NWT Council member Frank Oliver is elected as MP for Alberta.
  - Edmonton Golf Club established (first golf club in Edmonton)
  - Cornelius Gallagher Mayor of Edmonton October–December, 1896
  - John Alexander McDougall Mayor of Edmonton December 1896–December 1897
- 1897 – Edmonton is a starting point for people making the trek overland to the Klondike Gold Rush. Nearby South Edmonton (Strathcona) was the northernmost railway point on the western Prairies. (But Edmonton was still about 3000 kilometres from the goldfields.)
  - William S. Edmiston Mayor of Edmonton December 1897–December 1899
- 1899
  - Royal Alexandra Hospital established
  - South Edmonton, south of the river, becomes Town of Strathcona.

== Early 20th century ==
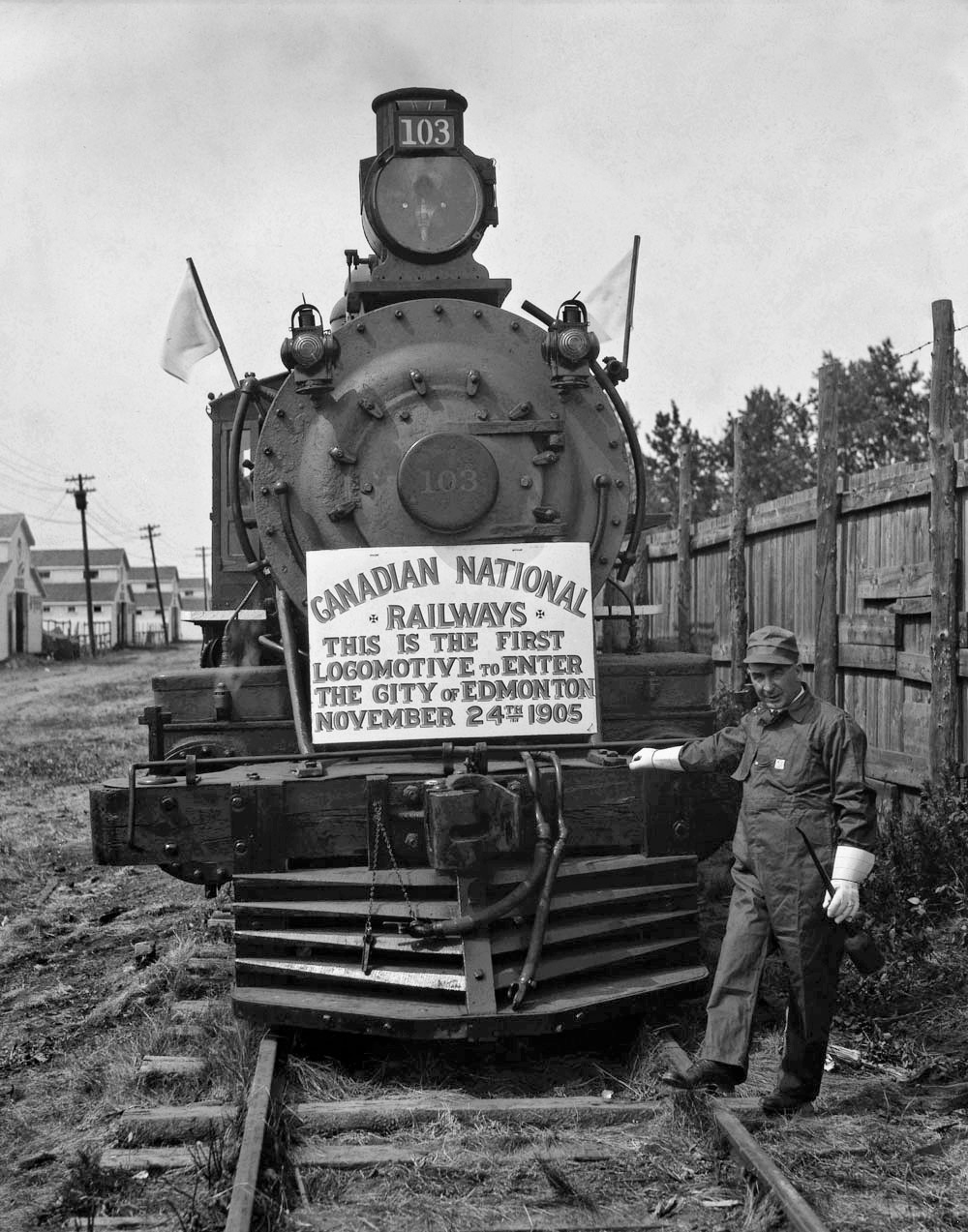
Canadian Northern Railway (CNoR) arrived in Edmonton in 1905.

- 1900
  - Low Level Bridge is completed. At first carries road traffic and foot traffic only. Train line put in in 1902; streetcar line put in in 1908.
- 1901
  - William Short Mayor of Edmonton January 1902–December 1904
- 1903
  - Edmonton Journal founded.
  - Methodist Church Board founds Alberta College
  - Edmonton, Yukon and Pacific Railway is built on the Low Level Bridge to connect Rossdale Station in Edmonton on the north side of the river by rail to Strathcona and thence to the outside world. In 1906 railway line is extended from Rossdale west to 124 Street and up out of the river valley, then back east along 104 Avenue to downtown Edmonton.
  - First car in Edmonton is unloaded off the train that brought it. Owner, Joe Morris.
- 1904
  - Incorporated as a city with a population of 8,350. First mayor, Kenneth MacKenzie.
  - Elected Liberal MP Frank Oliver in federal election. (Strathcona on the southside elected Liberal MP Peter Talbot.)
- 1905
  - Edmonton became the capital of Alberta, as Alberta became a province in Confederation. Alberta's first provincial election saw Edmonton elect Liberal Charles W. Cross as its MLA. Strathcona elected Liberal Alexander Cameron Rutherford, who served as Alberta's first premier.
  - Canadian Northern Railway (CNoR) arrived in Edmonton, accelerating growth. The first railway line in Edmonton to directly connect to Winnipeg, it is completed as a transcontinental line in 1915.
  - Rossdale Brewery (Edmonton Brewery and Malting Company) built by W.H. Shepard
- 1907-13 – Real estate and construction boom. With amalgamation of the cities of Strathcona and Edmonton, the population of Edmonton grew to 72,500.
- 1907
  - Six miners die in a fire at the Strathcona Coal Company, near south end of today's High Level Bridge, the deadliest industrial accident Edmonton has suffered
  - First paving blocks laid on McDougall Avenue, now 101 Street.
- 1908
  - Edmonton Hockey Club makes the city's first appearance at the Stanley Cup finals.
  - Edmonton Street Railway (streetcars) begins operations, crosses Low Level Bridge.
  - Strathcona Canadian Pacific Railway Station completed, along the Calgary & Edmonton Railway line.
  - University of Alberta established in Strathcona and began instruction. First convocation
  - Edmonton Pressed Brick opens a plant on the slope of the river valley in east Cloverdale in 1908. Plant made as many as 30,000 bricks daily, upwards of 5 million bricks in a year, for next six years. Its excavations formed the "Camel Humps".
- 1909
  - Grand Trunk Pacific Railway enters Edmonton. Built its roundhouse and railyard northwest of Edmonton. Village of West Edmonton established in 1910. Later took the name Calder.
  - Arlington Apartments completed. (destroyed by fire in 2005)
- 1910
  - Edmonton Kennel Club formed
  - Third McDougall Church, the brick one standing today, completed, dedicated in honour of George McDougall.
- 1911
  - Great Western Garment Co. (maker of denim products) founded in Edmonton, by Charles A. Graham and Alexander Cameron Rutherford
  - Connaught Armoury built in Strathcona.
- 1912
  - Edmonton amalgamated with the city of Strathcona, a city since 1907, south of the North Saskatchewan River; as a result, the city extended south of the river.
  - First Presbyterian Church completed.
  - Industrial Workers of the World were active in Edmonton. led a strike by municipal ditchdiggers.
  - Elm Park (near Calder AKA Village of West Edmonton) annexed.
- 1913
  - Alberta Legislature Building completed.
  - Edmonton Public Library first opens with two branches.
  - High Level Bridge opened. It carried a CPR rail-line and streetcar lines as well as a two-lane road for private vehicles (both horse-drawn and gas-fuelled) and sidewalks for pedestrians.
  - Robertson-Wesley United Church completed.
  - Edmonton economy collapses. With completion of Legislative Building and High Level Bridge, unemployment became problem. Land in the Hudson's Bay Company reserve was put on the market and sold, with the money raised by the sales going to HBC headquarters out of the province. British investment dried up as Europe invested in military preparation for the coming war. This all caused real estate prices to drop. With the start of World War I, the city's population declined, going from 72,000 in 1914 to under 54,000 in only two years, people leaving to eke out existence on farms, or off to war, or to other centres.

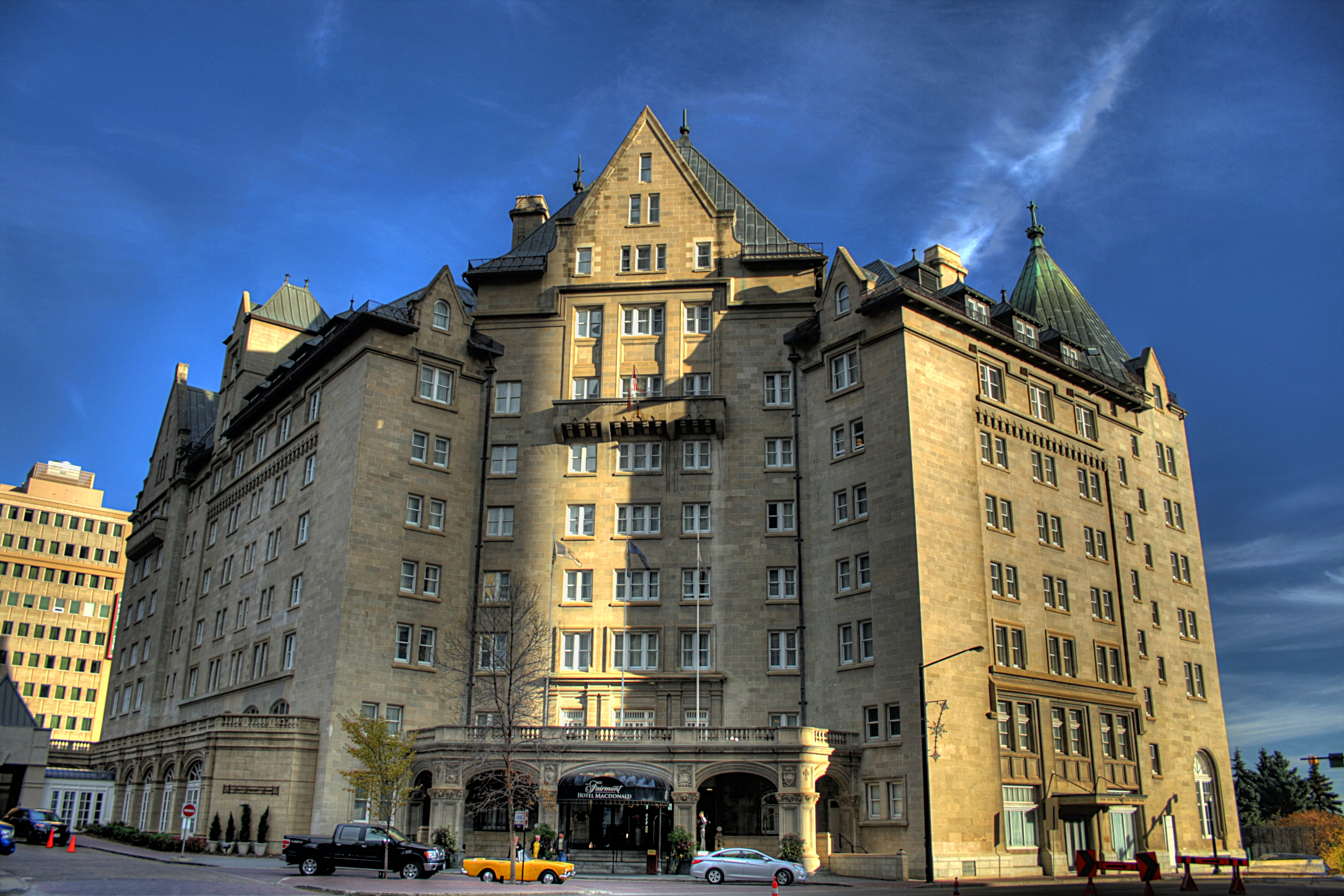
The Hotel Macdonald in downtown Edmonton

- 1914 – Vote held on street naming system (following amalgamation of Strathcona and Edmonton, each with their own systems) Numerical numbering (centred on Jasper Avenue and 101 Street) got 2099 votes; "Edmonscona" scheme (a mixed number-name system) got 1471 votes.
- 1914-1915 – Prince of Wales Armouries built.
- 1915
  - Fort Edmonton (No. 5) is dismantled. It was recreated in 1974 at Fort Edmonton Park.
  - Hotel Macdonald opens. It is built by the Grand Trunk Pacific Railway, soon to be bankrupt and rolled into the Canadian National line.
  - North Saskatchewan River flood of 1915 leaves 2000 homeless.
- 1916
  - Rotary Club of Edmonton founded.
  - Emily F. Murphy appointed first female police magistrate (equivalent of a provincial court judge today), making her the first female judge in the Commonwealth.
- 1917
  - Edmonton annexes village of West Edmonton (Calder).
  - Edmontosaurus, a genus of hadrosaurid (duck-billed) dinosaur that lived 66M to 73M years ago, is named for Edmonton.
- 1918
  - Joseph Clarke Mayor of Edmonton January 1919–December 1920 (Labour-orientation)
- 1918–1919 – Spanish Flu pandemic. Thousands are sick, unable to work. Kills 614 Edmontonians.
- 1919
  - General strike, in support of Winnipeg General Strike and local grievances, and simultaneous coal miners' strike were part of Edmontonians' involvement in the post-WWI Canadian labour revolt. Municipal-level Labour Party competed in 1919 election and achieved a majority on city council.
- 1920
  - Edmonton Symphony Orchestra holds its first performance.
  - David Milwyn Duggan Mayor of Edmonton January 1921–December 1923 (Conservative, also served as MLA)
- 1921
  - First woman MLA elected in Edmonton – Liberal Nellie McClung (Liberals elect their whole slate and make clean sweep of Edmonton seats at least partly due to use of plurality block voting.)
  - First woman elected to Edmonton city council – Izena Ross of the Citizens Committee party
- 1922
  - CJCA begins broadcasting as city's first radio station.
  - Edmonton Grads win the Canadian Basketball Championship. The team wins this competition each year from 1922 to 1940.
  - Edmonton Eskimos football team, sponsored by local Elks society, took the name Edmonton Elks in October 1922. At first known as the Edmonton Rugby Foot-ball Club, the team had taken the name Eskimos. By 1922 that name was thought to be inappropriate to the team as it "did not connote any qualities desired in football players" and "it begot a false notion of the geographical position of Edmonton." The team disbanded during WWII. (see 1954) (Today's Edmonton Elks have taken the team's old name).
  - Royal Mayfair Golf Club opens
- 1923
  - Edmonton Grads win the World Basketball Championships.
  - 1923 Edmonton used single transferable voting for the first time in its municipal elections. The city switched back to block voting in 1928.
  - Kenny Blatchford Mayor of Edmonton December 1923–December 1926
- 1924
  - The Edmonton Art Gallery opened for the first time.
- 1926
  - Edmonton elected its first "third-party" MLAs – UFA's John Lymburn and Labour Party's Lionel Gibbs. Use of proportional representation helped make this happen.
  - Ambrose Bury Mayor of Edmonton January 1927 – December 1929 (also served as Conservative MP)
- 1927
  - CKUA, the University of Alberta's radio station, and the first educational radio station in Canada comes on the air.
- 1929
  - Blatchford Field (now Edmonton City Centre (Blatchford Field) Airport) commenced operation.
  - Five women activists – Emily Murphy, Henrietta Muir Edwards, Nellie McClung, Louise McKinney and Irene Parlby – meet at Emily Murphy's house at 11011 88th Avenue and sign a petition for official recognition of women as persons, which led to the opening of the Senate to women appointees.
  - James McCrie Douglas Mayor of Edmonton January 1930–November 1931 (also served as Liberal MP, then a Borden Unionist MP)
- 1930
  - Canadian Derby established.
  - The Great Depression hit Edmonton hard. Unemployment soared.
  - The Ku Klux Klan operated in Edmonton in the early 1930s, burning crosses when politicians that were thought to be sympathetic to its cause were elected.
- 1931
  - Dan Knott Mayor of Edmonton November 1931–November 1934 (of the Labour Party)
- 1932
  - Edmonton Hunger March in December. A demonstration by struggling workers and farmers is repressed by billyclub-wielding police, some on horseback. Subsequently, police raid the Hunger March headquarters. 27 arrested.
- 1933
  - First traffic light begins flashing, at the 101st Street and Jasper Avenue intersection.
- 1934
  - Joseph Clarke Mayor of Edmonton November 1934–November 1937 (he held pro-labour sentiments)
- 1935
  - Edmonton elected its first Social Credit MLAs in 1935 Alberta General Election.
  - Margaret Crang, the youngest person ever to serve on city council when she was elected in 1933, is re-elected. She was the first woman to be re-elected to the city council.
- 1937
  - Edmonton's hottest temperature (until 1998) is recorded as 37.2 °C on June 29.
  - John Wesley Fry Mayor of Edmonton November 1937–November 1945
- 1938
  - Al-Rashid Mosque completed.
  - Clarke Stadium completed.
- 1939
  - King George VI and Queen Elizabeth visited Edmonton on June 2 as part of the 1939 royal tour of Canada
- 1941
  - HMCS Nonsuch (Naval Reserve division, Edmonton, Alberta) commissioned as a tender to HMCS Naden 1 November
- 1942
  - A record-breaking snowfall of 39.9 centimetres hits Edmonton on November 15. Equipment being shipped through Edmonton for the construction of the Alaska Highway is put to work clearing city streets.
- 1943
  - The Edmonton Regiment was part of the invasion of Sicily and later saw action in Italy.
- 1944
- 1945
  - Harry Ainlay Mayor of Edmonton November 1945–November 1949 (member of the Labour party, then the CCF)
- 1946

== Later 20th century, after discovery of oil at Leduc ==
- 1947
  - St. Josaphat Cathedral completed.
  - The first major oil discovery in Alberta was made near the town of Leduc, south of Edmonton.
- 1947–1965 – Suburban boom began.
- 1948 – Edmonton Flyers win the Allan Cup.
- late 1940s and 1950s – The subsequent oil boom gave Edmonton new status as the "Oil Capital of Canada", and during the 1950s, the city increased in population from 149,000 to 269,000. After a relatively calm but still prosperous period in the 1960s, the city's growth took on renewed vigour concomitant with high world oil prices, triggered by the 1973 oil crisis and the 1979 Iranian Revolution. The oil boom of the 1970s and 1980s ended abruptly with the sharp decline in oil prices on the international market and the introduction of the National Energy Program in 1981; that same year, the population had reached 521,000.
- 1949
  - Sidney Parsons Mayor of Edmonton November 1949–November 1951 (had been member of Labour Party)
- 1950 – Edmonton Mercurys win the Ice Hockey World Championships
- 1951
  - Edmonton Bulletin ceases production.
  - Princess Elizabeth and the Duke of Edinburgh visit Edmonton
  - William Hawrelak Mayor of Edmonton November 1951–September 1959 (served three times as mayor)
- 1952
  - Clover Bar Bridge completed.
  - Edmonton Mercurys win the Olympic Gold medal.
- 1953 – Nationwide polio epidemic. 16 Edmontonians died from poliomyelitis.
- 1954
  - Edmonton Eskimos win their first Grey Cup.
  - Matt Baldwin's team become the Edmonton rink to win The Brier (curling).
  - CFRN Television began broadcasting at 3 pm on October 25 on Channel 3
- 1955
  - Groat Bridge completed.
  - Westmount Centre opened as the city's first shopping mall.
- 1957
  - Jubilee Auditorium opened.
- 1958
  - Army base Griesbach Barracks established
- 1959
  - Valley Zoo opened.
  - Queen Elizabeth II and Prince Philip visit Edmonton. The Queen opens Coronation Park.
  - With the end of proportional representation (STV) in 1956, first-past-the-post voting is used to elect Edmonton MLAs. Social Credit scores a clean sweep of city seats.
  - Ukrainian Shumka Dancers founded in Edmonton.
  - Frederick John Mitchell Mayor of Edmonton September 1959–October 1959
  - Elmer Ernest Roper Mayor of Edmonton October 1959–October 1963 (CCF and NDP official)
- 1960 – Edmonton International Airport opened
  - Sourdough Raft Race inaugurated.
  - Queen Elizabeth Planetarium (QEP) as the very first public planetarium in Canada
- 1961
  - Town of Beverly amalgamated with the City of Edmonton.
  - Canadian Broadcasting Corporation television station CBXT began broadcasting on October 1.
  - Royal Glenora Club opens (merger of three Edmonton sports clubs: the Glenora Skating and Tennis Club, the Braemar Badminton Club, and the Royal Curling Club)
- 1962
  - Edmonton's local exhibition had been renamed to Klondike Days.
  - Northern Alberta Institute of Technology established.
- 1963
  - Edmonton Oil Kings win their first Memorial Cup.
  - Edmonton Opera established.
  - Meadowlark Mall opens
  - William Hawrelak Mayor of Edmonton October 1963–March 1965 (his second time as mayor)
- 1964 – Town of Jasper Place amalgamated with Edmonton. Number of city councillors increased from ten to twelve, still as before elected in a city-wide "at-large" district using block voting.
- 1965
  - Citadel Theatre opened.
  - Edmonton aircraft bombing.
  - Northgate Shopping Centre opened.
  - Vincent Dantzer Mayor of Edmonton March 1965–October 1968 (Conservative party member)
- 1966 – CN Tower was completed, the tallest building in Edmonton at the time, and city's first skyscraper.
- 1967
  - Provincial Museum and Archives of Alberta opened.
  - Mayfair Park opens
- 1968
  - Fluoridation of city water is approved in referendum. Twice before (1961 and 1964), citizens voted against it.
  - Change to ward election of councillors approved by referendum. Edmonton divided into four wards, each electing three councillors using block voting.
  - Ivor Dent Mayor of Edmonton October 1968–October 1974 (NDP official)
- 1969
  - The Misericordia Community Hospital opens its new building in west Edmonton.
  - Edmonton becomes the first Canadian city to join the North American Emergency Telephone 9-1-1 plan.
- 1970s – Major construction boom occurred.
- 1970
  - Southgate Shopping Centre opened.
- 1971
  - Grant MacEwan Community College established.
  - James MacDonald Bridge opened.
  - AGT Tower was completed and the tallest building in Edmonton at the time.
  - The Mill Woods Development Concept was approved. The area was planned to house approximately 120,000 people, its population in 2023.
  - City elections use wards, covering just part of the city, to elect city councillors for the first time.
- 1972
  - Alberta Oilers founded.
  - Ukrainian Canadian Archives & Museum Of Alberta opened.
- 1974
  - Fort Edmonton Park established.
  - Northlands Coliseum opened.
  - William Hawrelak becomes mayor of Edmonton for the third time in October 1974 (dies in office November 1975)
- 1975
  - First McDonald's in Edmonton opens, in Capilano area
  - Terry Cavanagh becomes Mayor of Edmonton after William Hawrelak's death November 1975–serves until October 1977 (He served as acting mayor 1988-1989 again after Decore's resignation.)
- 1976
  - Edmonton Heritage Festival begins at Mayfair Park.
  - Muttart Conservatory opened.
- 1977
  - Marigold becomes Edmonton's official flower.
  - Cec Purves Mayor of Edmonton October 1977–October 1983 (Mormon)
- 1978
  - 1978 Commonwealth Games.
    - Queen Elizabeth II and Prince Philip, along with their sons Princes Edward and Andrew, attend and open the Games
  - Edmonton LRT started.
  - Edmonton Sun founded.
  - Commonwealth Stadium opened.
  - Kinsmen Centre opened.
- 1979 – Edmonton Oilers join the National Hockey League.
  - Danny Hooper’s Stockyard opens as Edmonton's first country music showroom and steakhouse. Closes 1986.
- 1980s – Although the National Energy Program was later scrapped by the federal government, the collapse of world oil prices in 1986 and massive government cutbacks kept the city from making a full economic recovery until the late 1990s.
- 1980
  - Edmonton Folk Music Festival launched.
  - Alberta Aviation Museum established
  - The Great Divide waterfall flows from the High Level Bridge for the first time. (It flowed for the last time in 2009.)
- 1981
  - Heritage Mall opened
  - West Edmonton Mall opened.
  - Edmonton Food Bank established, the first official food bank in Canada
- 1982
  - Edmonton Fringe Theatre Festival is held for the first time.
  - A large explosion at the CIL plant in Edmonton could be felt up to 30 kilometres (19 mi) away.
  - 1982 Alberta election. An Edmonton seat taken by NDP candidate Ray Martin. First time since the end of proportional representation in 1956 that a CCF or NDP MLA was elected in Edmonton.
  - Mayfair Park renamed to William Hawrelak Park
  - General annexation of rural land outside Edmonton. City limits pushed to 41 Avenue South.
- 1983
  - 1983 Summer Universiade.
  - Hotel Macdonald closes after falling into disrepair.
  - Manulife Place was completed and was the tallest building in Edmonton until it was surpassed in 2017 by the Stantec Tower.
  - Edmonton Convention Centre opened.
  - Phase II of West Edmonton Mall opened.
    - Fantasyland opened
  - Political parties, such as the Urban Renewal Group of Edmonton (URGE), used for last time in city elections, until their rebirth in 2025.
  - Laurence Decore Mayor of Edmonton October 1983–October 1988 (later served as Liberal MLA)
- 1984
  - Edmonton hosts the Grey Cup for the first time.
  - Edmonton Oilers win their first Stanley Cup
  - Edmonton Trappers win their first Pacific Coast League championship.
  - Edmonton Space Science Centre opened.
  - Edmonton Expo Centre opened.
  - Taste of Edmonton food festival founded
  - St. Joseph's Cathedral elevated to a basilica
  - Canada Packers closes meat packing plant affecting 350 employees
- 1985
  - Edmonton International Street Performer's Festival is held for the first time.
  - Phase III of West Edmonton Mall opened.
- 1986
  - Edmonton International Film Festival is held for the first time.
  - North Saskatchewan River rises 11.5 metres higher than normal, the worst flood since 1915.
  - Three people killed and one injured when the Mindbender roller coaster at West Edmonton Mall's Fantasyland derailed.
  - The Works Art & Design Festival launched.
  - World Waterpark opened.
  - Violent labour dispute at Gainer's meat packing plant

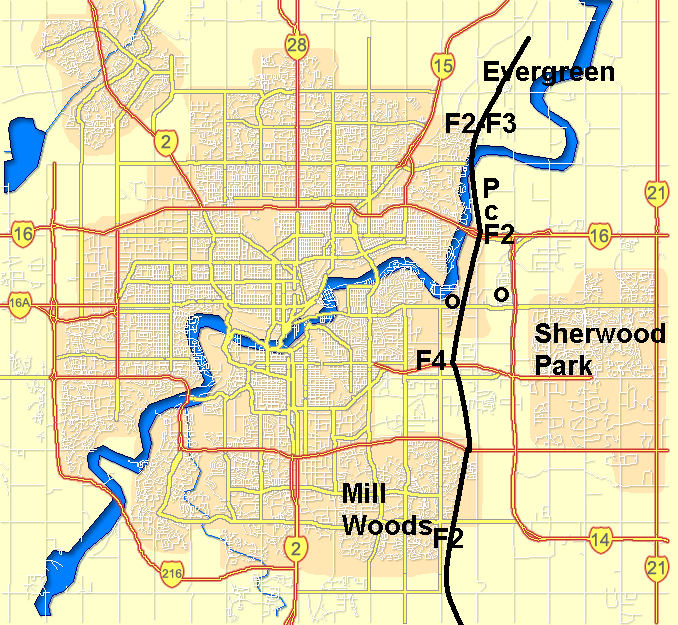
The path taken by the F4 Edmonton tornado in 1987. The F numbers are for the Fujita values, the O is for Imperial Oil Strathcona and Petro-Canada refineries, P is the Edmonton Power Clover power station and C is for the Celanese Canada chemical plant.

- 1987
  - Edmonton tornado kills 27 and causes more than $300 million damage.
  - Edmonton is officially twinned with Harbin, China
  - Celebration of Stanley Cup win on Jasper Avenue turned into riot. Dozens arrested.
- 1988
  - The Grey Nuns Community Hospital opens in Mill Woods.
  - Edmonton Oilers trade Wayne Gretzky, Marty McSorley, and Mike Krushelnyski to Los Angeles
  - Canada Place opens as the main federal government office in Edmonton
  - Terry Cavanagh Mayor of Edmonton October 1988–October 1989
- 1989
  - Jan Reimer becomes the first female mayor of Edmonton (NDP affiliation)
- 1990
  - Edmonton Police Constable Ezio Faraone shot and killed while on duty
- 1991
  - Hotel Macdonald reopened after significant restoration and a change in ownership.
  - Alberta Aviation Museum opens at the Hanger on Kingsway
- 1992
  - The current Edmonton City Hall completed.
  - A referendum was held on the downtown airport. 54 per cent of respondents stated that the City Centre Airport should remain open to the traffic it could handle.
- 1993
  - Edmonton Eskimos win their 11th Grey Cup, defeating the Winnipeg Blue Bombers
- 1994
  - Coca Cola closes Edmonton bottling plant.
  - The Rolling Stones performed at the Commonwealth Stadium with more than 60,000 in attendance in two back-to-back shows on October 4 and 5.
- 1995
  - After 91 years of service, Telus acquired Edmonton Telephones Corporation (Ed Tel), the city's publicly owned telephone company.
  - Edmonton Queen (riverboat) christened.
  - Fantasyland changed its name to "Galaxyland", after a lawsuit filed by the Walt Disney Company.
  - Bill Smith Mayor of Edmonton October 1995–October 2004
- 1996
  - 1996 World Figure Skating Championships.
  - Keillor Road closed after 1995 referendum and much controversy.
- 1997
  - Winspear Centre opened.
  - 85th Grey Cup: Nov. 16, 1997
- 1998
  - Edmonton's hottest temperature is recorded at 38.3 °C (100.9 °F), on August 5.
- 1999
  - Phase IV of West Edmonton Mall opened.
  - Landslide destroys three homes on Whitemud Road in the Ramsay Heights neighbourhood.
  - August 31 – the last Lilith Fair was held in Edmonton's Commonwealth Stadium. (Edmonton also hosted a show of the unsuccessful 2010 revival tour.)

== 21st century ==
- 2000
  - Heritage Mall closed.
  - Researchers at the University of Alberta publish the Edmonton Protocol, describing a process of islet transplantation that has changed the lives of people with diabetes.
  - CFB Griesbach (Griesbach Barracks) closed
- 2001
  - 2001 World Championships in Athletics.
  - Canada Day riot on Whyte Avenue.
- 2002 – 90th Grey Cup: Nov. 24, 2002
- 2003
  - 2003 Heritage Classic.
  - An estimated 18,000 marched against the Iraq War: February 15. A statue of Wayne Gretzky was decorated in retribution for his stated support for President Bush's stand on the war.
- 2004
  - Large hailstorm causing widespread damage throughout the city most notably causing the evacuation of West Edmonton Mall.
  - Edmonton Trappers (professional baseball) disbanded
- 2005
  - Edmonton hosts its first Grand Prix
  - Edmonton celebrates 100 years of being the capital of Alberta.
  - Queen Elizabeth II and Prince Philip visit Edmonton.
  - The Provincial Museum of Alberta becomes The Royal Alberta Museum.
  - Alice Major appointed first poet laureate for the City of Edmonton
- 2006
  - 2006 Women's Rugby World Cup.
  - May 12-June 17 Edmonton Oiler Stanley Cup playoff run inspires riots and expensive damage to businesses along Whyte Avenue. Finally put down by mass arrests of hundreds of revellers.
- 2007
  - 2007 Ford World Men's Curling Championship.
  - Largest residential fire in Edmonton's history burns down a 149 unit condominium complex, which was under construction, along with 18 duplexes. Causing $20 million in damages.
- 2008
  - Edmonton region population surpasses one million becoming the most northern city in North America with a population over one million.
- 2009
  - Edmonton submits a bid for Expo 2017.
  - Electric trolley buses make their last runs on city streets.
  - Mazankowski Alberta Heart Institute opens at University of Alberta Hospital
- 2010
  - The Art Gallery of Alberta is reopened in its new building
  - Edmonton for first time uses single-seat wards and first-past-the-post voting to elect its city councillors.
  - FC Edmonton (professional soccer club) founded
  - 98th Grey Cup played in Edmonton Nov. 28, 2010
  - The Edmonton LRT reached Century Park in April
- 2011
  - The Epcor Tower is completed, becoming Edmonton's tallest skyscraper.
  - The Edmonton Clinic opens.
  - The city's homicide rate swells; 47 murders by the year.
- 2013
  - The inaugural Tour of Alberta launches from Edmonton.
  - Edmonton City Centre Airport closes November 30.
- 2014
  - 53-year-old Phu Lam murders his ex-wife and six relatives on December 29, the worst mass murder in Edmonton's history.
  - Edmonton Neon Sign Museum, Canada's first neon sign museum, is established.
- 2015
  - NDP elected in all 19 Edmonton ridings – 2015 Alberta Election. Rachel Notley becomes Premier
  - Const. Daniel Woodall killed in shooting
  - Roxy Theatre burns
  - 2015 FIFA Women's World Cup
- 2016
  - Construction is completed on August 16, 2016, for the Royal Alberta Museum's new location in Downtown Edmonton.
  - Rogers Place arena in Downtown opens in September.
  - Anthony Henday Drive is officially completed with the opening of its northeast section, including two new bridges over the river, on October 1. It is the furthest north ring road in North America.
- 2017
  - 2017 Edmonton attack (stabbing and vehicle-ramming attack)
  - Completion of the new Walterdale Bridge as a replacement for the old bridge
- 2018
  - Completion of the Stantec Tower becoming the tallest in building in Canada outside of Toronto.
  - Construction on the JW Marriott Hotel completed, becoming the second tallest building in Edmonton
  - Opening of a new building for the Royal Alberta Museum to the public
  - Edmonton's first safe injection site opens in the inner city.
- 2019
  - Edmonton Stingers (professional basketball) play their first game.
  - Edmonton annexes 82.7 km^{2} (31.9 mi^{2}) of land mostly from Leduc County
  - Environmental protesters blocked Walterdale Bridge. Members of Extinction Rebellion blocked traffic for one hour.
- 2020
  - Edmonton co-hosts the 2020 Stanley Cup playoffs behind closed doors due to the COVID-19 pandemic.
  - Edmonton Eskimos football team changes name to Edmonton Elks.
  - Dr. Michael Houghton (University of Alberta) is 2020 Nobel Prize winner in Physiology or Medicine (co-recipient along with Harvey J. Alter and Charles M. Rice).
- 2021 Scramble crossings installed where 104th and 105th Streets cross Whyte Avenue in bid to make roads safer for pedestrians. (City announces in 2026 that they will be removed.)
- 2023
  - 2023 Heritage Classic
  - Edmonton receives more than 7000 NWT wildfire evacuees
- 2024
  - Canadian Finals Rodeo returns to Edmonton
  - 2024 Americas Cup Triathlon Edmonton
- 2025
  - Magpie becomes Edmonton's official bird.
  - Political parties are re-introduced into the Edmonton Civic Election. Better Edmonton party and PACE (Principled Accountable Coalition for Edmonton) party.

== See also ==
- History of Edmonton
- List of tallest buildings in Edmonton
- Timeline of Alberta history
- Timeline of labour issues and events in Canada
