= Thomas Wallace =

Thomas Wallace may refer to:

- Thomas Wallace (Irish MP) (1765–1847), Irish politician, UK member of parliament
- Thomas Wallace, 1st Baron Wallace (1768–1844), British politician, president of the Board of Control and vice president of the Board of Trade
- Thomas Browne Wallace (1865–1951), member of parliament for West Down, 1921–1922
- Thomas George Wallace (1879–1920), Canadian member of parliament for the Ontario ridings of York Centre and York West
- Thomas Wallace (horticulturalist) (1891–1965), English chemist, horticulturalist, pomologist, and soil scientist
- Thomas Seller Wallace (1896–1935), British-born Canadian police officer killed in the 1935 Royal Canadian Mounted Police killings
- Thomas W. Wallace (1900–1943), lieutenant governor of New York in 1943
- Thomas Wallace (footballer) (1906–1939), English football defender
- Thomas Wallace (RAF officer) (1916–1944), South African World War II air ace
- Thomas Wallace (rugby union) (1892–1954), Irish rugby union player
- Tom Wallace (born 1936), Australian politician
- Tommy Lee Wallace (born 1949), American film producer, director and screenwriter
- Thomas Wallace, drummer of Australian indie rock band Red Riders
