= McDougall United Church =

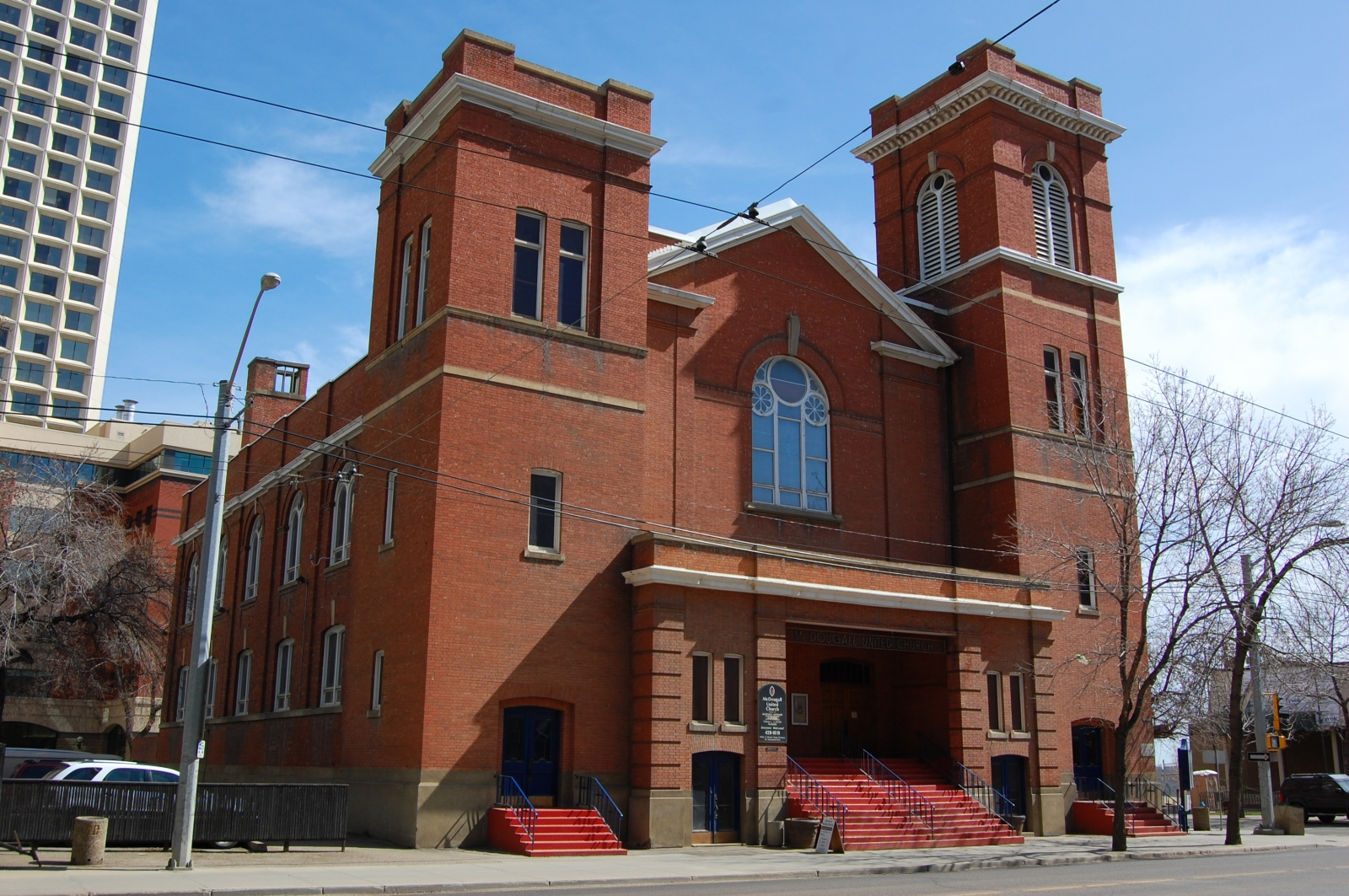
- Front entrance of McDougall United
- McDougall United Church
- 53°32′23″N 113°29′35″W
- Location: 10086 MacDonald Drive NW; Edmonton, Alberta; T5J 2B7
- Denomination: United Church of Canada
- Previous denomination: Methodist
- Website: mcdougallunited.com

History
- Former name: McDougall Methodist Church
- Status: Church
- Founded: 1871
- Founder: Robert Rundle
- Dedication: George McDougall
- Dedicated: 1910

Architecture
- Functional status: Functioning
- Architect: H.A. Magoon
- Style: Italianate

Specifications
- Materials: Brick

The McDougall United Church is a church located in Downtown Edmonton, Alberta, Canada, at 10086 MacDonald Drive NW.

== History ==
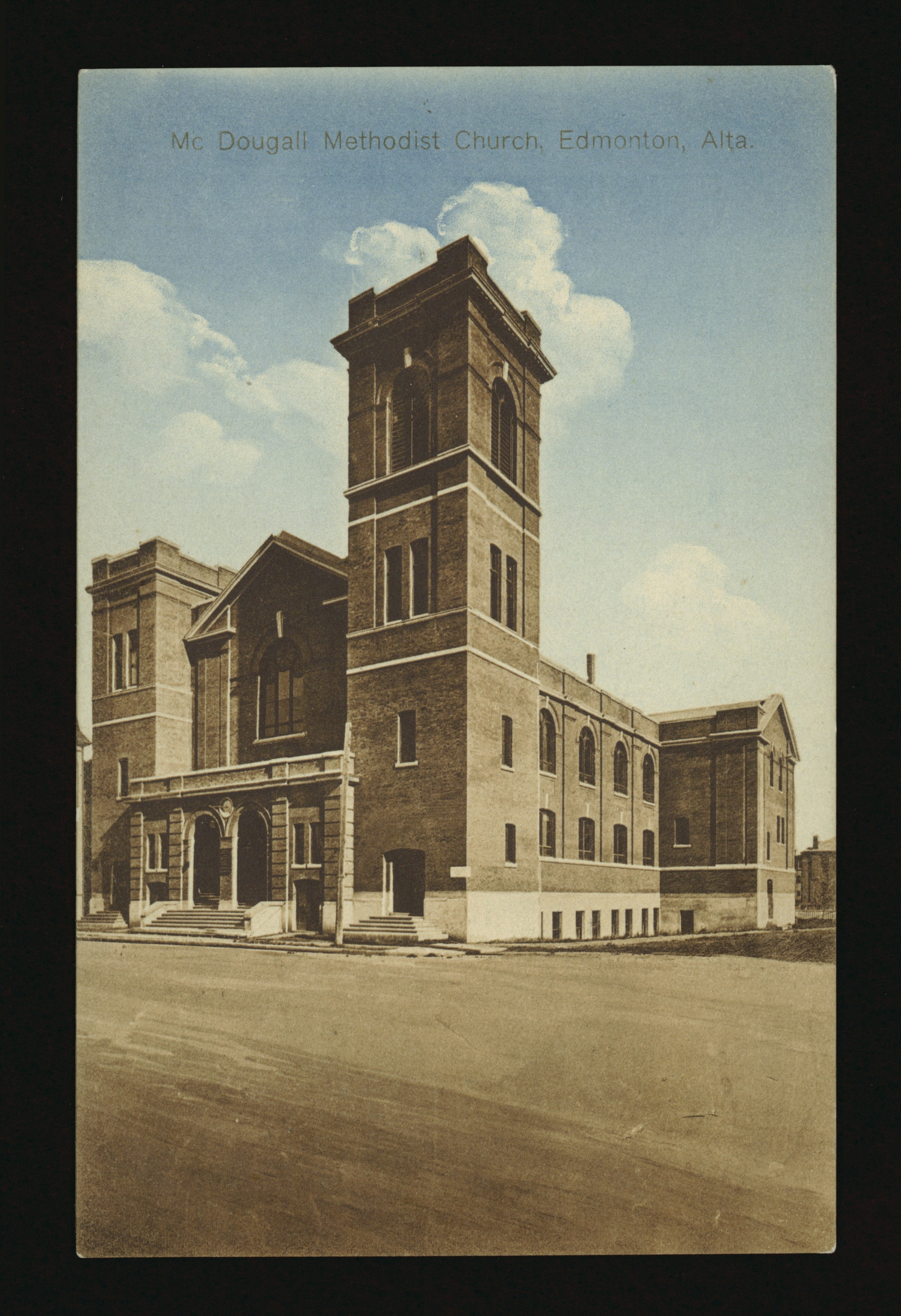
Exterior view of the McDougall Methodist Church and grounds circa. 1910 in Edmonton, Alberta

McDougall United Church was founded as a Methodist church in Edmonton. Methodists started coming to Alberta in 1840, when Robert Rundle came to Fort Edmonton. He was an itinerant missionary; later, another missionary by the name of Peter Campbell came to Edmonton in the 1860s. It was still 10 years before Edmonton had a resident Methodist. George McDougall established a school in 1871, to teach English to the children of the Hudson's Bay Company employees, because the most used languages then were French, Gaelic and Cree.

The McDougalls were a family of Methodist missionaries: George and his son John started missions to the native people in Pakan (north east of Edmonton), and Morley (west of Calgary). After the smallpox epidemic of 1870, in which many of the McDougall women and children died, the survivors moved to Edmonton before moving to Morley. The second Methodist church was built in 1892 and called "McDougall Church" in honour of the now deceased founder. The current brick McDougall Church, built in 1910 and dedicated to the honour of George McDougall, was designed by H. A. Magoon. It is two-and-a-half stories tall and built in the Italianate style. A brick annex was added in 1954.
