= Canadian Newcomer Magazine =

Canadian Newcomer Magazine Logo (c)

Canadian Newcomer Magazine (French edition: Nouvel Arrivant au Canada) is a social enterprise publication launched by Dale Sproule in 2004 specifically to provide new immigrants with the information they require to settle and integrate in Canada. The magazine and its website are published in English and French and distributed in large and small centres across Ontario, with the help of funding from Citizenship and Immigration Canada.

== Target audience ==
Branding itself as the "How-To Magazine for New Immigrants", Canadian Newcomer Magazine/Nouvel Arrivant au Canada tries to make sure that newcomers understand not just the information necessary to make decisions, but the steps involved in following through to navigate around the pitfalls, hazards and barriers they are likely to encounter during the course of their settlement to achieve their goals.

== Content ==
Themed issues cover different aspects of life in Canada, including laws and rights, health, language training and even shopping.
There is a strong emphasis on providing knowledge of the Canadian work environment, and providing connections to agencies and programs that help readers gain the skills to find employment.

== Special issues ==
Canadian Newcomer's annual Settlement Guide to Ontario contains comprehensive listings of settlement, English as a Second Language (ESL) and employment service providers, along with up-to-date contact information and summaries of their specific programs and services.

== Reach ==
The magazines are distributed through settlement service agencies, ESL classrooms and employment agencies across Ontario. An online version of the magazine, along with archived back issues, news releases, and event listings are available through Canadian Newcomer Magazine's website. The magazine currently publishes six issues per year with a print run of 62,000 copies in English and 5,000 copies in French. Although the magazine's philosophy has always been to offer information in the languages of the marketplace in Canada, their website also offers multilingual editions (available in .pdf format) in Arabic, Urdu, Persian, Tagalog, Portuguese, Spanish, Chinese, Punjabi, Russian and Korean. In 2004, Canadian Newcomer was cited in Masthead Online's Tally 2004 (of notable Canadian magazines) under the Special Interest category.

== Canadian Newcomer Magazine in the news ==
(1) Magazine for newcomers now available in 10 languages | https://web.archive.org/web/20110706190339/http://www.nccpeterborough.ca/?p=1671
(2) Canadian Newcomer Magazine adds ESL tool | http://www.mediaincanada.com/articles/mic/20080416/cnmag.html
