= Alberta Health Care Insurance Plan =

Canadian healthcare program

The Alberta Health Care Insurance Plan is the system of tax-funded health insurance for residents of the province of Alberta.

Most residents of Alberta who are either Canadian citizens, permanent residents of Canada, or have refugee status in Canada and who live in Alberta for 183 or more days per year or more and who are not already covered by the health insurance plan of another province are eligible for coverage. Exceptions, who are not covered, include members of the Canadian Armed Forces, federal penitentiary inmates, refugee claimants not yet given status, refused or failed refugee claimants, and people with expired immigration documents.

== History ==
A failed attempt to create a publicly funded healthcare system in Alberta was the Alberta Health Insurance Act passed through the legislature by the United Farmers of Alberta majority government in 1935 shortly before the UFA were defeated in that year's election. The plan called for mandated health insurance premiums paid by employers and employees as well as tax funding from general revenues. The incoming Social Credit Party of Alberta government declined to implement the program.

The Social Credit government did, however, create the Associated Hospitals of Alberta (AHA) in 1948 to operate a voluntary (not mandated or universal) public insurance scheme alongside private insurance. This system continued until Medical Care Act (1966) passed by the federal parliament offered the provinces 50% funding if they created their own universal insurance programs, to which Alberta signed in 1969. Monthly healthcare premiums were charged, until they were scrapped in 2009.

Since that time universal insurance has been administered by the Government of Alberta's Ministry of Health, with the care itself provided by privately run doctors' clinics and publicly-run hospitals (administered by either Alberta Health Services or Covenant Health since 2009).

As of April 1, 2022 the Ukrainian Evacuee Temporary Health Benefits Program allows Ukrainians fleeing the Russian invasion and staying in Canada on temporary visas to receive health insurance without the typical waiting period. As of July 2022, 7,200 applications for The U.E.T.H.R.P. were received in Alberta.

== See also ==
- Ontario Health Insurance Plan
- Régie de l'assurance maladie du Québec
