= Ontario Health Insurance Plan =

Health insurance plan provided by the Government of Ontario

The Ontario Health Insurance Plan (French: Assurance-Santé de l'Ontario), commonly known by the acronym OHIP (pronounced /ˈoʊhɪp/ OH-hip), is the government-run health insurance plan for the Canadian province of Ontario. OHIP is funded by a payroll deduction tax by residents who are gainfully employed, by businesses in the province of Ontario, and by transfer payments from the Government of Canada.

== Covered services ==
Every Ontario resident with their primary and permanent home in Ontario is entitled to access emergency and preventive care under OHIP free of charge. Ontario residents may go to a participating doctor—essentially every doctor practising in the province—any time they wish (subject to the consent of the doctor) and the services are billed through OHIP to the government.

In 2018, the Ontario Health Insurance Plan announced a new program designed to assist individuals struggling with food addiction.

=== Prescription drug ===
OHIP does not generally cover prescription drugs outside of hospitals or dental care. However,

- the Ontario Drug Benefit program pays for prescription drugs for seniors covered by OHIP.
- the Trillium Drug Program covers households with high prescription drug costs.
- as of 1 January 2018, prescription drugs for those under 25 years of age are covered by OHIP through OHIP+.

As of 1 April 2019, the Ontario government will no longer offer free prescriptions to children and young adults with private coverage.

=== Physiotherapy ===
OHIP coverage for physiotherapy was restricted to those 65 years of age and over, those 19 years of age and under, residents of long-term care homes (regardless of age), individuals who had been hospitalized (regardless of age) and individuals on the Ontario Disability Support Program, Family Benefits and Ontario Works (regardless of age).

=== Optometry ===
OHIP covers the cost of one major eye exam (for vision and general eye health) every 12 months, plus any minor assessments you need, but only if you are 19 years and younger, or 65 years and older. If you are 20 to 64 years old, and you have a specific medical condition affecting your eyes that requires regular monitoring, OHIP will cover a major eye exam for you once every 12 months and any follow-up appointments related to the condition.

=== Dental ===
It provides free, routine dental services for low-income seniors who are 65 years of age or older, with the income requirements of an annual net income of $22,200 or less for a single senior, or a combined annual net income of $37,100 or less for a couple (for year 2022).

=== International coverage ===
OHIP will only cover a very limited amount of the costs if you receive emergency health services while you’re travelling outside Canada, including the following OOC emergency services: doctor services (e.g. medical assessments, emergency surgery), emergency outpatient services (e.g. MRIs, CT scans), emergency inpatient services (e.g. hospital stays, nursing services).

== Funding ==
While Ontario receives transfer payments from the Government of Canada to partially fund health care, OHIP is also supported by general provincial tax revenues and premiums (taxes) paid by employers and individuals. Employers are charged a payroll health care tax (with an exemption for small businesses), and residents of the province pay a health premium (introduced in 2004) as part of their income taxes. Similarly, Ontario publicly funds hospitals.

The Ontario Health Premium (OHP) is a component of Ontario's Personal Income Tax system. The OHP is based on taxable income for a taxation year. As of May 2010, an Ontario resident with taxable income (i.e., income after subtracting allowable deductions) of $21,000 pays $60 per year. With a taxable income of $22,000, the premium doubles to $120. With a taxable income of $23,000, the premium is $180. With a taxable income of $24,000, the premium is $240. The premium increases at a decreasing rate thereafter for taxable incomes up to $200,600 at which point the maximum premium of $900 is reached.

== Delisted care ==
Until 2004, OHIP also paid for an eye examination every two years and limited chiropractic and physical therapy/physiotherapy services. The May 2004 budget, however, announced that most eye exams and all chiropractic and physical therapy would be "delisted" (removed) from coverage, by the Liberal government of Dalton McGuinty. Physiotherapy ended up never being delisted from OHIP. Instead, effective April 1, 2005, OHIP coverage for physiotherapy was restricted to those 65 years of age and over, those 19 years of age and under, residents of long-term care homes (regardless of age), individuals who had been hospitalized (regardless of age) and individuals on the Ontario Disability Support Program, Family Benefits and Ontario Works (regardless of age). OHIP covers up to 50 visits per year post-hospitalization and up to 100 visits per year for residents of long-term care homes. The McGuinty government at the time promised to expand OHIP coverage for residents of long-term care homes and for residents of rural and remote areas. The provision continues to be made for free coverage to minors. Annual eye examinations are free for children (19 or younger), seniors (65 or older), adults ages 20–64 with certain ocular health conditions (including glaucoma, cataracts, and diabetes), as well as those receiving ODSP or Ontario Works (every two years).

== Eligibility ==
In order to be eligible for coverage under OHIP, a person must normally be a Canadian citizen or permanent resident or a holder of a work permit as set out in Ontario's Health Insurance Act, must have a permanent and principal home in Ontario, and must be physically present in Ontario 153 days in any 12-month period. Canadian citizens or permanent residents returning to Canada from another country are not normally covered by OHIP until they have been resident in Ontario for three months. In 2009, applicants for permanent residence from within Canada were added to the plan, following the "Approval In Principle" (AIP) stage of the process. Applicants from outside Canada continue to be ineligible for OHIP until they have completed the landing process and have actually become permanent residents, when the usual three-month waiting period begins. It is recommended to obtain private health insurance to cover the waiting period. For Canadian citizens or permanent residents moving to Ontario from another province, the province of the previous residency continues to cover them during the three-month waiting period.

== Waiting period ==
- Transfer from another province, territory, or country: the waiting period used to be three months, but as of March 19, 2020, that has been temporarily removed because of the COVID pandemic.
- Military spouses: immediate regardless of origin.
- Applicants for permanent residence from inside Canada: obtaining of permanent residence
- Applicants for permanent residence from outside Canada: obtaining of permanent residence (15–24 months as of April 2014)

== Precursors ==
Ontario's first government-run health plan, known as OMSIP (Ontario Medical Services Insurance Plan), was established and enacted on 1 July 1966. On 1 October 1969, it was replaced by OHSIP, the Ontario Health Services Insurance Plan, as a provincially-run and federally-assisted plan under the federal Medical Care Insurance Act for the establishment of a national medical plan. In 1972, its name was shortened to simply OHIP.

== See also ==
- Ministry of Health (Ontario)
- Ontario Health (agency)
- Ontario
- Health care in Canada
- Alberta Health Care Insurance Plan
