= 1935 killings of Royal Canadian Mounted Police officers =

1935 Murder of four police in Canada

1935 Royal Canadian Mounted Police Killings
- Location: Near Pelly, Saskatchewan, and Banff, Alberta, Canada
- Date: 5–8 October 1935
- Attack type: Spree shooting, shootout, robbery
- Weapons: Knives; .32 S&W revolver; Stolen .38 Special Colt New Service Revolver; .303 Winchester Model 1895
- Deaths: 7 (four constables and three perpetrators)
- Perpetrators: John Kalmakoff, Joseph Posnikoff, and Peter Woiken
- Motive: Unknown

The 1935 Royal Canadian Mounted Police Killings were a series of murders of three Royal Canadian Mounted Police and one local constable from 5–8 October 1935. They began with the murders of Benito Constable William Wainwright and RCMP Constable John Shaw near Pelly, Saskatchewan, by three Doukhobor men who had been in the custody of the officers - John Kalmakoff, Joseph Posnikoff, and Peter Woiken. This led to a shootout which killed two additional RCMP officers in Banff, Alberta, and the death of perpetrator Joseph Posnikoff. The remaining two perpetrators were shot by Banff Park Game Warden William Neish, as they were pursued by a combined posse of RCMP officers and armed civilian volunteers.

The ordeals involved RCMP detachments from three provinces in western Canada and remained one of the deadliest incidents in RCMP history until the Mayerthorpe tragedy in 2005. With the death of all perpetrators, the motivations of the perpetrators remain unknown.

== Pelly shooting ==
The string of murders began late in the evening of 4 October 1935 when officer Wainwright and Shaw apprehended three Doukhobor farmers in Benito, Manitoba, including John Kalmakoff, Joseph Posnikoff, and Peter Woiken, under suspicion of involvement in a bank robbery. The suspects were loaded into Shaw's unmarked police vehicle. As with common practice at the period, none of the men were searched before they were put into the vehicle. For reasons unknown, at approximately 04:00 CST on 5 October 1935, en route to the RCMP detachment building in Pelly, both officers were attacked with knives and a .32 revolver that had been smuggled into the police vehicle .

Wainwright was stabbed and shot with his own revolver, while Shaw was also stabbed and later shot three times with the smuggled .32 revolver as he attempted to both ward off the attackers and drive. The car crashed into a ditch, and the three perpetrators looted the vehicle, leaving behind the corpses of the slain officers. A local farmer discovered their bodies on 7 October, and immediately reported it to the authorities.

== Banff shootout ==
After the bodies of Wainwright and Shaw were discovered, the news of the murders and information about suspects was relayed to RCMP detachments across western Canada. By 19:00 MST on 7 October 1935, news had been communicated into Alberta. Although off-duty, Sergeant Thomas Seller Wallace and Constable G.E. Combe joined forces with uniformed officers George "Scotty" Harrison and Grey Campbell and were mobilized to search for the fugitives. At about 19:20 MST on 7 October, the fugitives pulled into a service station 20 kilometres east of Canmore, Alberta, to buy only one gallon of gas, an odd request. Lucille and Roy Zeller, the owners of the station, recognized the suspects from the descriptions being broadcast on the radio and called police, informing Constable Campbell that the perpetrators were heading west. The disorganized suspects realized they had no real escape plan and were running out of money.

On 8 October 1935, the perpetrators robbed a vehicle driven by C.T. Scott, stealing his money and wristwatch. They bizarrely informed him that they would return his wristwatch if he did not inform the police and followed his vehicle westward as it drove towards Banff.

As the two vehicles arrived in Banff, Scott stopped his vehicle before an RCMP checkpoint near the eastern gate of Banff National Park and informed the uniformed Campbell that the men in the vehicle following him had robbed him.

The perpetrators' vehicle stopped and as Wallace and Harrison approached the vehicle, its occupants fired two shots through the windshield, hitting both officers. Harrison was shot in the neck. Even though mortally wounded, the officers fired back at the fugitives. Harrison shot out the headlights of the vehicle then lost consciousness. Wallace, a distinguished World War I veteran and renowned marksman, fired his service revolver until he was low on ammunition and collapsed from his wounds.

After the shoot-out, the three perpetrators abandoned their car and ran into the bush, pursued by Combe as Campbell loaded the wounded officers into his police vehicle. Combe caught a glimpse of Joseph Posnikoff hiding in the bush and fired his revolver at him, killing Posnikoff instantly. He recovered Wainwright's stolen revolver.

== Death of Kalmakoff and Woiken ==
By the evening of 8 October 1935, enraged residents had armed themselves and formed posses to help the RCMP track down the two remaining fugitives. The search team involved Sergeant John Cawsey and his dog Dale, one of the first police dogs employed by the RCMP. Ultimately, the fugitives were detected by Banff Park Game Warden and ex-RCMP officer William Neish. As the weather conditions worsening from rain to blowing snow, and with the assistance of Dale, Neish spotted the two fugitives and called for them to surrender. The fugitives began to exchange gunfire with Neish's party, until Neish himself mortally wounded Woiken amidst a volley of gunfire. Neish quickly also spotted Kalmakoff from the glint of his Winchester rifle barrel, and also mortally wounded him with another aimed shot.

== Aftermath ==
Woiken and Kalmakoff quickly lapsed from consciousness and died the same day. With the deaths of all three perpetrators, it is unclear what had motivated the typically upright and respectable Doukhobour perpetrators to turn to criminality, and attack Constable Wainwright and Shaw. It is also unclear which of the suspects fired the fatal shots that mortally wounded Wallace and Harrison.

Wallace and Harrison both died from their wounds after being transported to Calgary, and were afforded full Masonic and military funeral processions. Constable Shaw, a veteran of the Royal Flying Corps, was buried with full military honours in Swan River, Manitoba. The entirety of the event outraged the community in Banff and surrounding areas leading them to refuse burial to the three perpetrators. The Doukhobour families of the perpetrators refused to take back the bodies of Woiken and Posnikoff, and they were buried in an unmarked graved in Morley, Alberta. Kalmakoff was taken back by his family and buried in an unmarked grave in a Saskatchewan Doukhobour wheat field.

== See also ==
- List of law enforcement officers killed in the line of duty in Canada
- Kansas City massacre
