= Joseph Shaw =

Joseph or Joe Shaw may refer to:

- Joseph Shaw (boxer) (1938–2005), American boxer
- Joseph Shaw (legal writer) (1671–1733), English legal writer
- Joseph Shaw (editor) (1874–1952), editor of Black Mask magazine, 1926–1936
- Joseph Shaw (Christ's College) (1786–1859), Master of Christ's College, Cambridge
- Joseph Shaw, newspaper editor from Westminster, Maryland, murdered in 1865
- Joe Shaw (rugby union) (born 1980), Newcastle Falcons rugby union player
- Joe Shaw (footballer, born 1882) (1882–?), forward for Sunderland, Hull City and Grimsby Town
- Joe Shaw (footballer, born 1883) (1883–1963), left back for Arsenal and was later caretaker manager at the club
- Joe Shaw (footballer, born 1928) (1928–2007), centre half for Sheffield United
- Joseph Tweed Shaw (1883–1944), Canadian politician
- Joseph Carl Shaw (1955–1985), American murderer executed by the state of South Carolina
- Joseph Shaw (philosopher) (born 1971), British academic and chairman of the Latin Mass Society
- Joe Shaw (actor) (born 1972), English actor
