= Thomas Wallace (footballer) =

English footballer (1906–1939)

Personal information
- Full name: Thomas Hall Wallace
- Date of birth: 1 July 1906
- Place of birth: Jarrow, England
- Date of death: 1939 (aged 32–33)
- Position: Defender

Youth career
- Sunderland

Senior career*
Years	Team	Apps	(Gls)
1933–1936	Burnley	61	(1)
- * Club domestic league appearances and goals

Thomas Hall Wallace (1 July 1906 – 1939) was an English professional footballer who played as a central defender. He made 61 appearances and scored one goal in the Football League Second Division for Burnley.
