= Thomas Seller Wallace =

Canadian police officer (1896–1935)

Thomas Sellar Wallace
- Born: 1896; Banffshire, Scotland
- Died: 8 October 1935 (age 39); Banff, Alberta, Canada
- Burial place: Union Cemetery, Calgary, Alberta
- Military career
- Allegiance: United Kingdom; Canada
- Branch: British Army; Alberta Provincial Police; Royal Canadian Mounted Police
- Service years: 1914-1918 British Army; 1921-1932 Alberta Provincial Police; 1932-1935 Royal Canadian Mounted Police
- Rank: Serjeant (British Army); Sergeant (RCMP)
- Units: 1/6 Battalion, Gordon Highlanders
- Conflicts: World War I: Battle of Mons
- Awards: Military Medal; Mons Star; 1914–15 Star; Victory Medal; British War Medal; Byron Trophy (APP)
- Known for: Involvement in 1935 Royal Canadian Mounted Police Killings

Thomas Sellar Wallace, MM (1896 – October 8, 1935) was a British-born Canadian police officer who was killed in the 1935 Royal Canadian Mounted Police Killings. On 8 October 1935, Wallace was shot in the chest by one of the fugitives in the incident on the outskirts of Banff, Alberta, succumbing to his wounds later that day. He had previously earned a distinguished service record in the British Army during World War I. He emigrated to Canada and joined the Alberta Provincial Police after the war in 1921, before it was amalgamated with the Royal Canadian Mounted Police by 1932 and had been a law enforcement officer in Alberta for 14 years before his death.

== Early life and World War I ==
Wallace was born in Banffshire, Scotland and enlisted in the British Army prior to the First World War. Assigned to the 1/6 Battalion, Gordon Highlanders, he saw action in the initial campaigns of the war including the Battle of Mons as an "old contemptible" of the British Expeditionary Force. He was awarded a Military Medal for his distinguished service as a sniper and left the army as a Serjeant.

== Police career ==
After the First World War, Thomas emigrated to Canada and joined the Alberta Provincial Police in 1921. The force itself was relatively new after having been formed in 1917 to replace the paramilitary North-West Mounted Police which had just relinquished policing duties in Alberta. He was posted across Alberta throughout his career with the APP was noted as an effective policeman winning the Byron Trophy for being the best shot with a revolver in the entire force.

The force was amalgamated with the RCMP in 1932 as a cost-cutting measure during the Great Depression. At the time of the amalgamation, Wallace was an APP Sergeant serving as a drill instructor stationed in Lethbridge. He was allowed retained his rank in the newly formed Alberta detachment of the RCMP after additional training in Regina.

== Death and funeral ==
On 7 October 1935, Wallace had been dispatched with fellow British born RCMP officer Constable George "Scotty" Harrison while in dressed in plain clothed. They were to assist with the capture of three fugitive Doukhobors identified as John Kalmakoff, Joseph Posnikoff, and Peter Woiken. They had been suspected of killing Constable William Wainwright of the Benito police force and RCMP Constable John Shaw. They joined with uniformed RCMP officers G.E Combes and Gray Campbell in an unmarked police vehicle.

On 8 October, the perpetrators had robbed a vehicle driven by C.T Scott. Scott had his money and wristwatch stolen by the disoriented fugitives. They bizarrely informed him that they would return his wristwatch if he did not inform the police and continued to follow his vehicle westward as it drove towards Banff. As the two vehicles arrived in Banff, Scott stopped his vehicle before an RCMP checkpoint near the eastern gate of Banff National Park and informed the uniformed Campbell that the men in the vehicle following him had just robbed him.

As Wallace and Harrison approached the vehicle, two shots through the windshield were fired by its occupants, hitting both officers. The officers continued to engage the fugitives but had been mortally wounded. Harrison had been shot in the neck, and managed to shoot out the headlights of the vehicle before losing consciousness. Wallace fired his service revolver until he was low on ammunition and collapsed from his wounds. Combes was able to shoot Woiken, killing him instantly while the remaining two perpetrators were tracked down by a combined force of RCMP officers and enraged civilians. Kalmakoff and Posnikoff were both and ultimately shot and morally wounded by civilian William Neish.

Wallace was transported to Calgary for medical attention after the shooting where he died of his wounds, with his wife Helen at his side. His partner Harrison also died of his wounds on the same day. At the time of his death, Wallace had been a police officer for 14 years in Alberta. His long years of service were recognized in his massive funeral procession led by the Calgary Highlanders' Pipes and Drums band. He was buried with full masonic and military honours at Calgary's Union Cemetery.
