= Alberta Health Insurance Act (1935) =

The Alberta Health Insurance Act was an act passed by the Alberta Legislature in February 1935. It was the first Canadian health insurance act to provide some public funding for medical services, and as such is considered to be an early step toward the provision of medicare in Canada.

== Origins ==
In 1932, the College of Physicians and Surgeons of Alberta prepared a brief for a commission on health care reform that had been established by the Government of Alberta. The brief was presented by Albert Ernest Archer, an early supporter of public health care in Canada. The commission subsequently established a prepaid health insurance program for rural areas, and an employer/employee program for urban centres, with the province paying two-ninths of the total costs.

== Context ==
The United Farmers of Alberta (UFA) government proposed the Alberta Health Insurance Act of 1934. The legislation was to provide health care to every province resident at an annual cost of $14.50 per person (Canadian Dollars). However, the Act did not pass before the UFA government was defeated by the Social Credit Party. The plan would have required health care providers to provide specific services for the insured at no extra cost. These services included "full-time public health service", "complete medical service" (including major and minor surgery and obstetrics), "drugs and surgical appliances" if prescribed, limited "dental service", "private nursing service" (under special circumstances) and "hospitalization" (x-rays, operating room, lab services, etc.).

Although this plan was not enacted, in the 1940s and 1950s, support for a national health care system grew popular among provincial residents. Federal hospital insurance would provide federal funds to provinces that implemented a universal hospital insurance plan. The implementation of such programs developed, and in 1969 Alberta signed on to the national universal health insurance program.

== National vs. provincial government in Canada ==
Canadian health policies are co-financed by the federal government and provincial/territorial programs. Health care providers are mostly private, however, universal programs are implemented by the provincial government. The federal government's role is not only limited to financing, but it also regulates medical products such as pharmaceuticals, as well as funding medical research. However, the provincial government seem to play a bigger and more direct role as 47% of health care spending in Canada is provided for by them while 22% is provided for by federal transfers. With this large amount of provincial government spending in health care and other areas, the provincial government plays a large role in Canadian governing. Provincial government expenditure seems to be increasing and this may be attributed to the change in age distribution in Canada as this can cause a greater demand for more welfare in education and health care systems.

== Reform ==
The Alberta Health Insurance Plan was revised by the year 2000. Statues of the updated plan included more details and laws specific to payment. It established that "extra billing" was not permitted by physicians or dentists; this means they could not charge or collect money from a patient that was in addition to what the Minister covered. Many argue that over time health care has become more decentralized from the national government and more focused onto local governments. Reay and Hinings contend that after 1994 with the establishment of Regional Health Authorities there is a greater amount of power not only provincial governments but also regional governments. By establishing these specialized fields to facilitate, it took a more businesslike method. Although Canadian health care is highly prioritized when it comes to government spending, the total costs of health care administration is significantly less than the United States. "In the United States, health care administration cost $294.3 billion, or $1,059 per capita (Table 1). In Canada, health care administration cost $9.4 billion, or $307 per capita".

== Passage ==
The United Farmers of Alberta (UFA) government passed the commission's recommendations as to the Alberta Health Insurance Act in February 1935. The party subsequently lost the 1935 provincial election, however, and the new government did not follow through with the insurance plan.

== Aftermath ==
In 1948, the Alberta government passed legislation for a medical insurance program. This led to the establishment of Medical Services (Alberta), which was superseded by Canada's national medicare program in 1969.
