= George McDougall =

Canadian Methodist missionary (1821–1876)

Reverend George McDougall
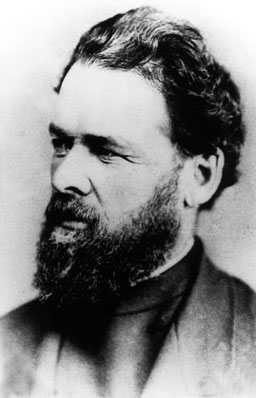
- Born: George Millward McDougall; September 9, 1821; Kingston, Upper Canada
- Died: January 25, 1876 (aged 54) near Fort Calgary, North-West Territories, Canada
- Occupation: Missionary

George Millward McDougall (September 9, 1821 – January 25, 1876) was a Methodist missionary in Canada who assisted in negotiations leading to Treaty 6 and Treaty 7 between the Canadian government and Indigenous nations of the prairies and what is now western Canada.

He founded missions and schools for First Nations in what is now Alberta.

== Biography ==
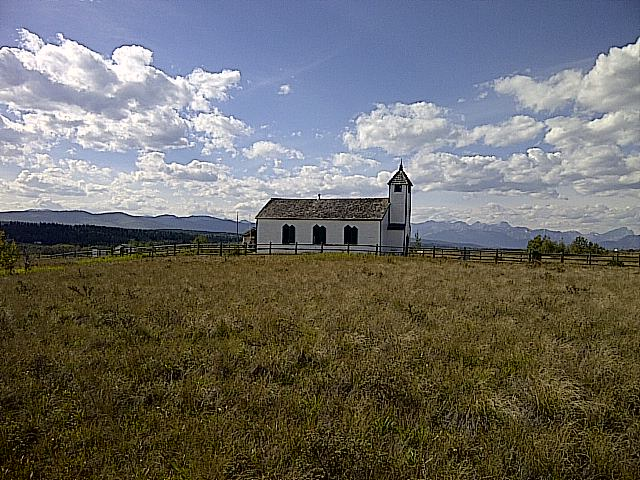
McDougall Mission

McDougall was born in Kingston, Upper Canada). In 1842 he married Elizabeth Chantler and they eventually had nine children. After attending Victoria College in Cobourg, he was ordained in 1854. In 1860 he was sent to the Rossville near Norway House. In 1863 he established the Victoria Mission near Edmonton, the earliest Methodist mission in the West and was superintendent of Methodist missionary work in the Saskatchewan District. In 1871 he founded a permanent mission at Edmonton House, a Hudson's Bay Company outpost at what is now Edmonton, Alberta.

In 1866 he was responsible for the theft of the 145 kg meteorite called the Manitou Stone, or Manitou Asinîy ('Creator's Stone'). He took it from its resting site to the nearby Victoria Mission, believing that it would bring Indigenous peoples to the mission and help him convert them to Christianity. Holly Quan wrote: "To the Blackfoot and Cree of the western plains, the Iron Stone was the embodiment of powerful spirits, a source of strength, power, protection and luck...To the Reverend George McDougall, the Iron Stone was a pagan symbol. With considerable effort, in the early spring of 1866 he had the stone dug from its resting place...to be proudly displayed on the lawn of the Methodist college where he was trained...That spring, when the Cree and Blackfoot came again to visit the Iron Stone...their link with the buffalo spirits...had mysteriously vanished. The elders predicted war disease and starvation. All their predictions came true." Since 1972, Manitou Asinîy has been held in the collection of the Royal Alberta Museum.

He and his son John McDougall served missions over a wide area, including to Indigenous groups at Pigeon Lake, Stoney Lake, Saddle Lake and Whitefish Lake. In Morleyville, they founded the McDougall Orphanage and Training School, an Indian residential school, around 1873.

George extended his ministry to southern Alberta, establishing McDougall Mission on the Bow River named Morleyville. On a hunting trip in January 1876 near the Nose Hill area George was lost in a blizzard and was found dead several days later. There is a cairn to mark the place of George's death, on Panora Way NW in Calgary.

== Bibliography ==
- McDougall, John (1888). George Millward McDougall: the pioneer, patriot and missionary. Toronto: William Briggs.
- McDougall, John, ed. (1890). Primer and Language Lessons in English and Cree. William Briggs.
- McDougall, John (1895). Forest, lake, and prairie; twenty years of frontier life in Western Canada (1842-62). Toronto: William Briggs.
- McDougall, John (1896). Saddle, sled and snowshoe: pioneering on the Saskatchewan in the sixties. Toronto: William Briggs.
- McDougall, John (1911). In the days of the Red River rebellion: Life and adventure in the far west of Canada (1868-1872). Toronto: William Briggs.
- McDougall, John (1911). On western trails in the early seventies: frontier pioneer life in the Canadian North-West. Toronto: William Briggs.
