= Fort Victoria, Alberta =

Historic site in Alberta

Fort Victoria
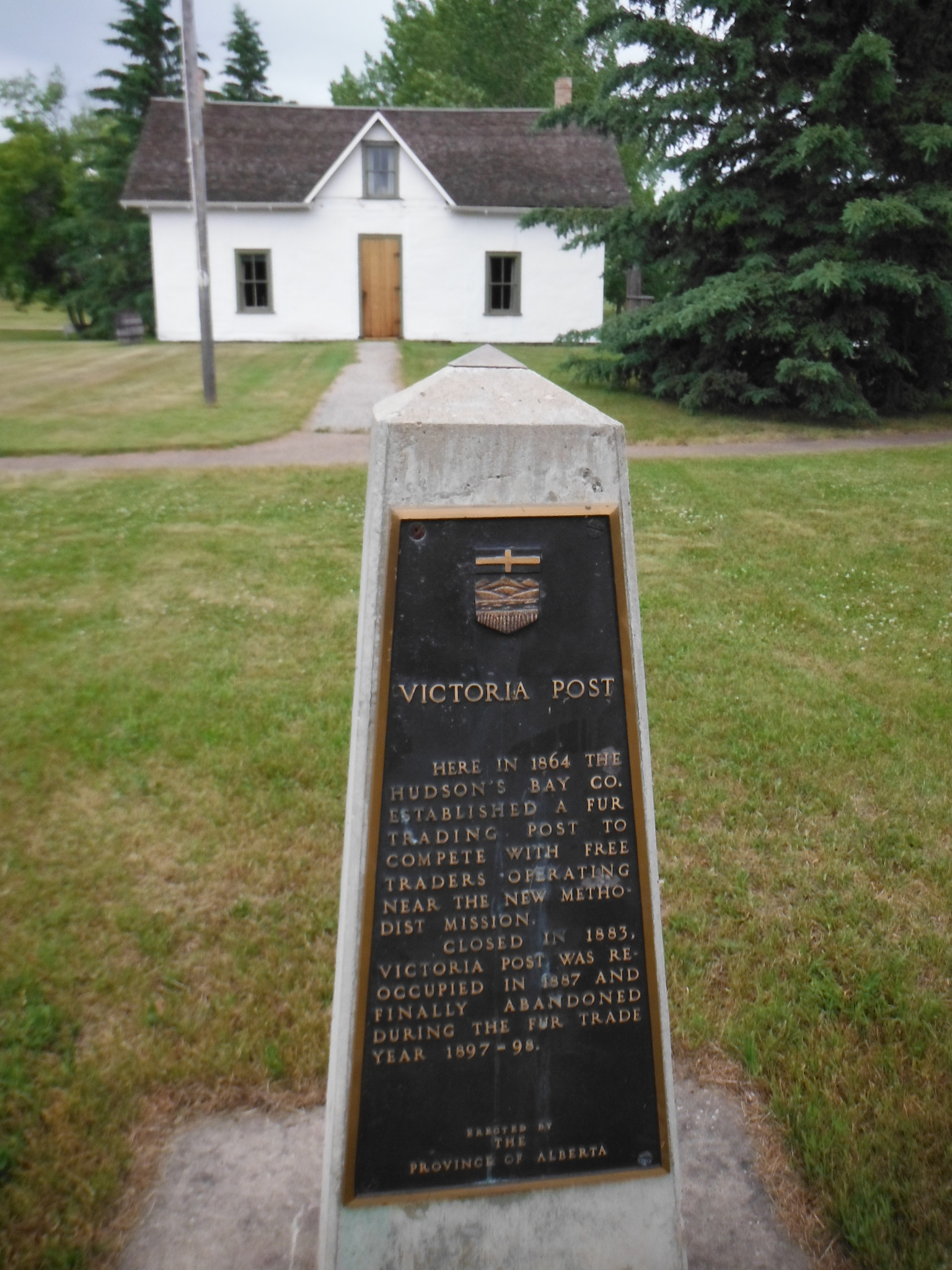

- Location in Alberta
- Location: Smoky Lake, Alberta, Canada
- Coordinates: 54.00384°N 112.39810°W
- Type: National Historic Site, Cultural landscape
- Website: Victoria Settlement

National Historic Site of Canada
- Official name: Victoria District National Historic Site of Canada
- Designated: 17 October 2001

Fort Victoria, near present-day Smoky Lake, Alberta, is located on the north bank of the North Saskatchewan River, 100 kilometres downstream from Edmonton. Today, it is a historical museum known as Victoria Settlement. The nearby rural residences make up Pakan, Alberta. Metis Crossing Cultural Heritage Gathering Centre is nearby.

The Hudson's Bay Company established Fort Victoria in 1864 on the North Saskatchewan River as a trading post with the local Cree First Nations. The site had previously been used starting in 1862 as a Methodist Missionary site, on the location of an aboriginal meeting place. It was named Victoria Settlement, after Queen Victoria.

== History ==
Methodist missionary George McDougall, and his family, established a missionary site at the site in 1862–63. This site was chosen because of its popularity as a hunting area and Cree settlement (there were always 10 to 100 Native tents present according to Mcdougall). It was also adjacent to the North Saskatchewan River and the Carlton Trail, at the time busy transportation routes. McDougall chose the name Victoria to honor Queen Victoria, queen at the time. The McDougall family relocated to Edmonton in 1871.

A Hudson's Bay Co. fort was established there in 1864. Fort Victoria (Victoria Settlement) was located along Victoria Trail/Carlton Trail between Edmonton and Fort Pitt and served as a stopping house on the overland route between the two as well as a waystation for travellers moving up or down the river. The fur trading post at Victoria was minor compared to Edmonton but it gradually attracted a small agricultural settlement, as occurred near other Hudson's Bay Company posts in those pioneer days. Clara Victoria Hardisty, daughter of Richard and Eliza Hardisty, was born here in 1868, and in 1926 was billed as the first white girl born in Alberta.

Land in the settlement was used according to the customary French-Quebec riverlot system, and a mixed community of First Nations, Métis, and Europeans developed. For several miles on each side of the present-day museum the riverlot system is still in use, the official survey reflecting the fact that farms and land usage predated the Dominion Land Survey of the 1880s. (The DLS in most cases carved up large, square tracts as per Dominion Lands Act).

Fort Victoria shifted from subsistence on wildlife—specifically bison—and trade in furs to agriculture (crops and livestock).

In 1864 George Flett was given the job of opening a Hudson's Bay Company trading post at Fort Victoria. Flett was of Orkney and Cree descent. Flett and John Norris led the first brigade of Red River ox-carts from Winnipeg to Edmonton, taking three and a half months on the journey. They passed through Victoria Settlement As clerk in charge of the post until 1866, Flett was responsible for arranging for construction of the buildings and for opening up trade with the local Indians. Flett quickly obtained a supply of good-quality furs, which Flett and his assistants took by horse and dog train to Fort Edmonton for shipment downriver to Hudsons Bay. The oldest building in Alberta still on its original foundations is the clerk's quarters at Fort Victoria, which dates from 1865.

The fort closed in 1883 but was re-opened in 1887. It operated until 1897–98.

Later the site of the fort became a hub for the early settlement of East-Central Alberta. It came to be called the Victoria Settlement and later, Pakan, after the Cree chief Pakannuk. Chief Pakan's name was sometimes given as "Peccan or Seenum".

Still later, the settlement served as a Methodist mission to Ukrainian Canadian settlers in the region.

The post was also a vital stop on the Carlton Trail from Winnipeg to Edmonton. The section of the trail currently within the eastern part of the city of Edmonton is a now a paved road called Victoria Trail in honour of the fort and of this route's historic past as an indigenous trail and trade route.

The fort lies within the larger Victoria District, as well as the Kalyna Country ecomuseum. It has been designated a national historic site of Canada, a provincial historic site of Alberta, as well as municipally designated by Smoky Lake County.

== Victoria Park Cemetery ==
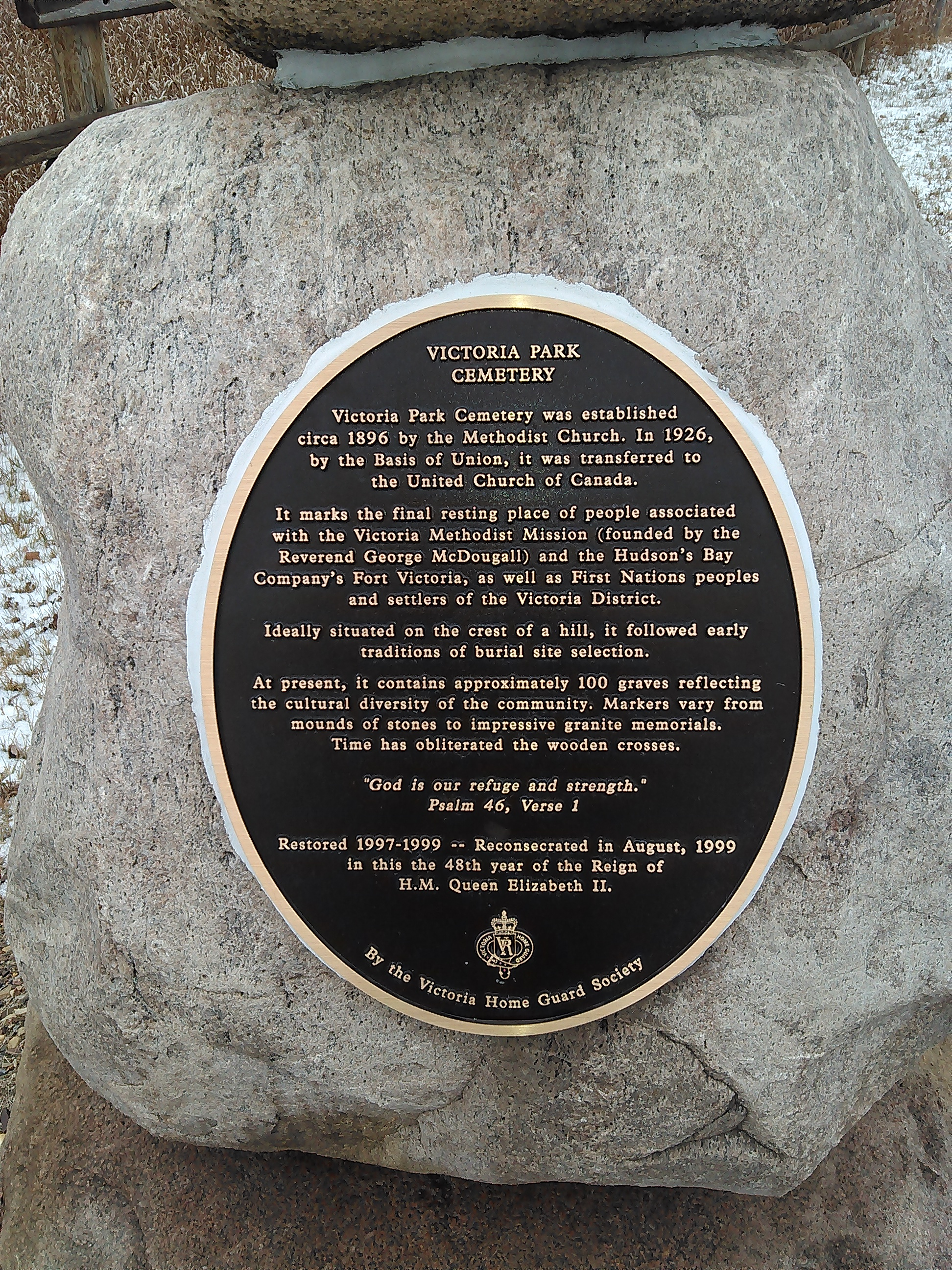
Plaque at Victoria Cemetery, near Smoky Lake, Alberta.

The Methodist church established Victoria Park Cemetery circa 1896, on a hill above the Victoria Settlement overlooking the river. It was the second of six cemeteries that were eventually established in the settlement. It contains approximately 100 recognizable graves of both Natives and Settlers, likely including victims of the 1870 smallpox epidemic. It was restored and rededicated in 1999.

== Victoria District National Historic Site of Canada ==
Fort Victoria and the Victoria Park Cemetery is situated within the larger geographic space of the Victoria District, which itself is currently one of twenty-three national historic sites in Alberta. The Victoria District and only two other historic sites are north of Edmonton. The Victoria District historic site is the only national historic site in rural Alberta.

== See also ==
- History of Alberta
- Kalyna Country
- Fort Pitt
- Royal eponyms in Canada

== Affiliations ==
The Museum at Fort Victoria is affiliated with: CMA, CHIN, and Virtual Museum of Canada.
