= Culture of Alberta =

The culture of Alberta refers to the art, customs, and traditions of the people of Alberta. Alberta entered into Confederation in 1905, placing it in a tie with Saskatchewan as the country's second youngest province. Despite its short history, the province possesses a rich culture. The vastness of the land and variation of geography — which includes mountains, foothills, grassland, parkland, forest, and rockland — have served as important sources of creative inspiration across all art forms. Alberta's primary industries of farming, ranching, and petroleum also play a major part in the province's culture and identity.

== Arts ==
=== Architecture ===
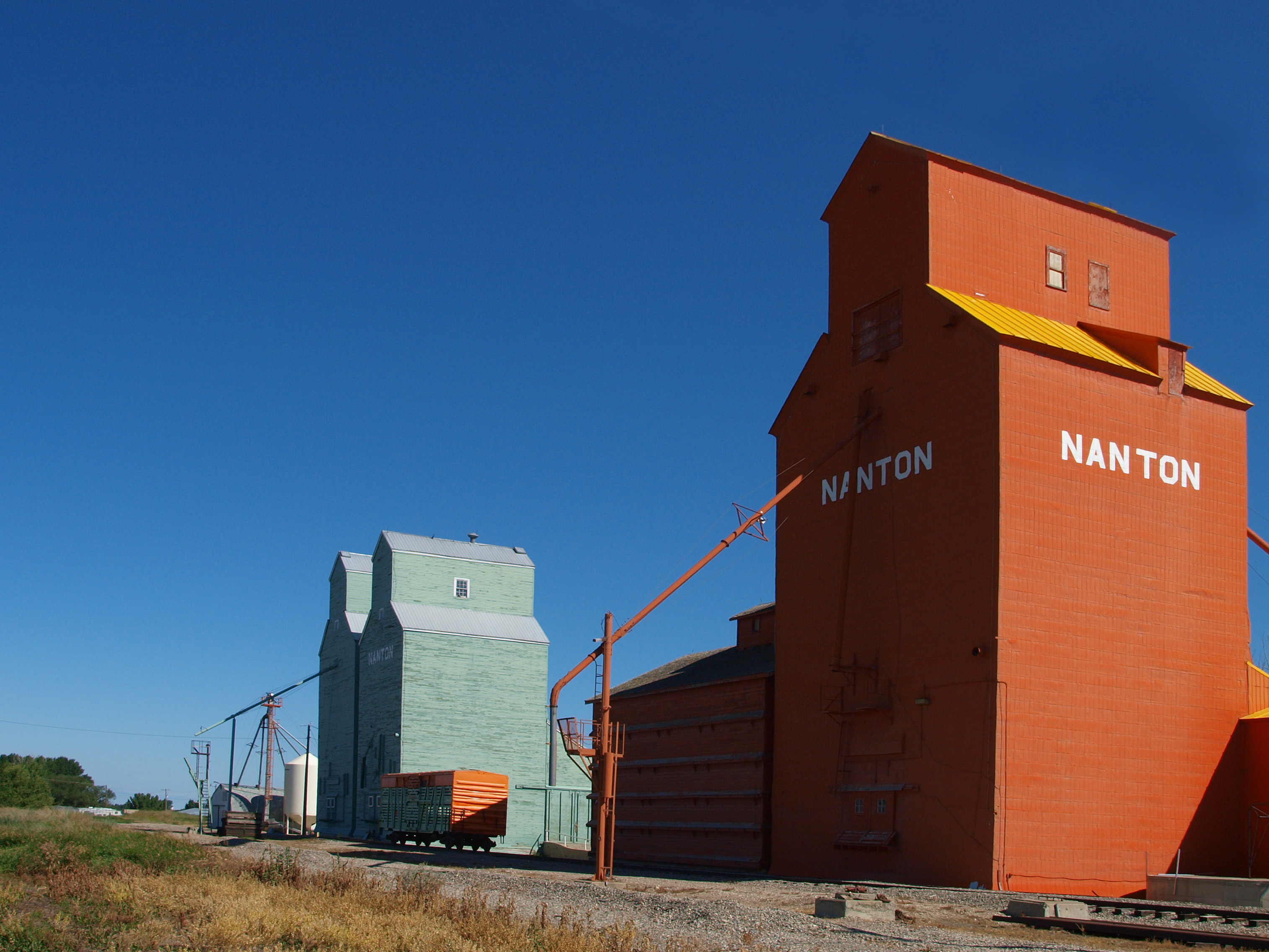
Elevator row in Nanton

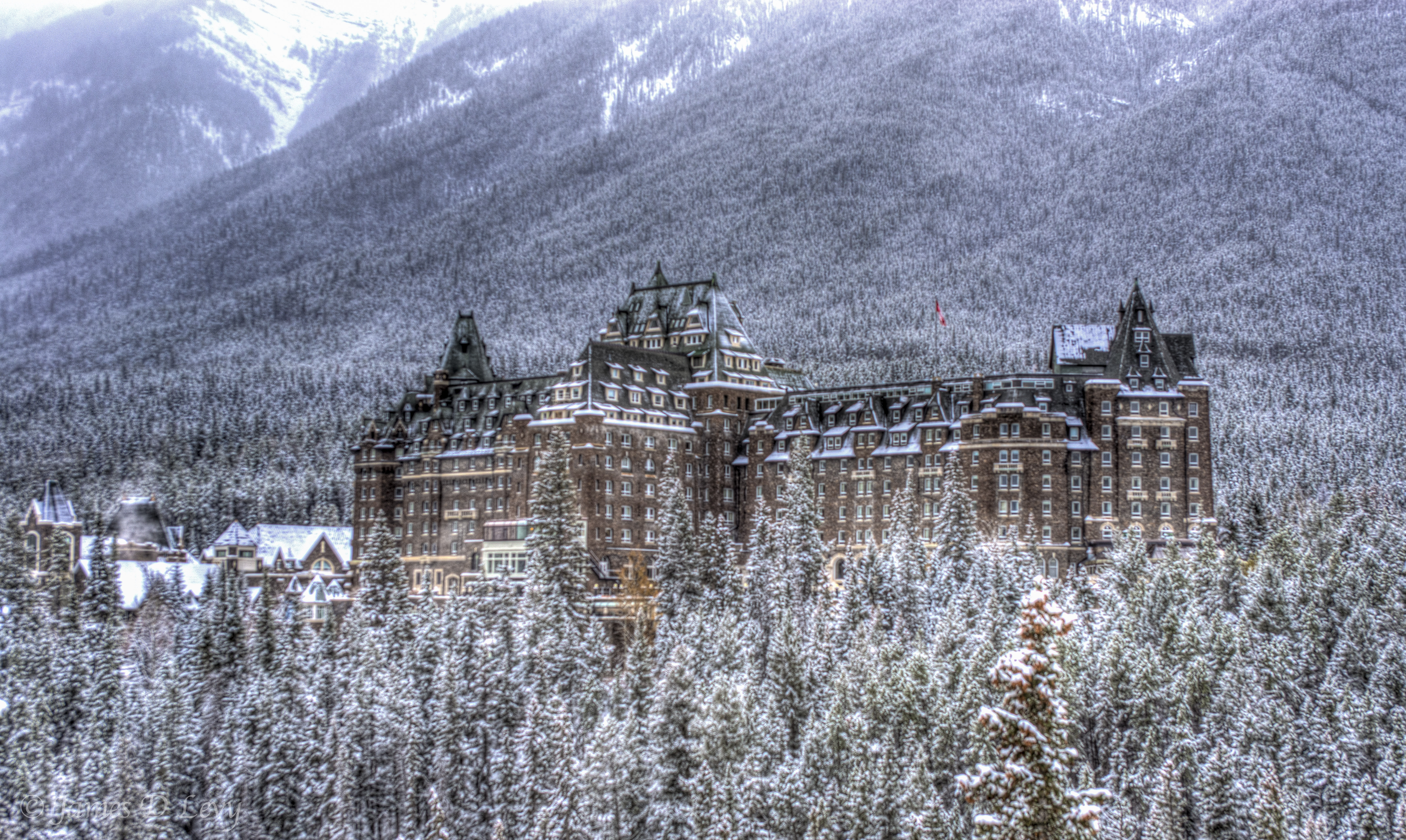
Banff Springs Hotel

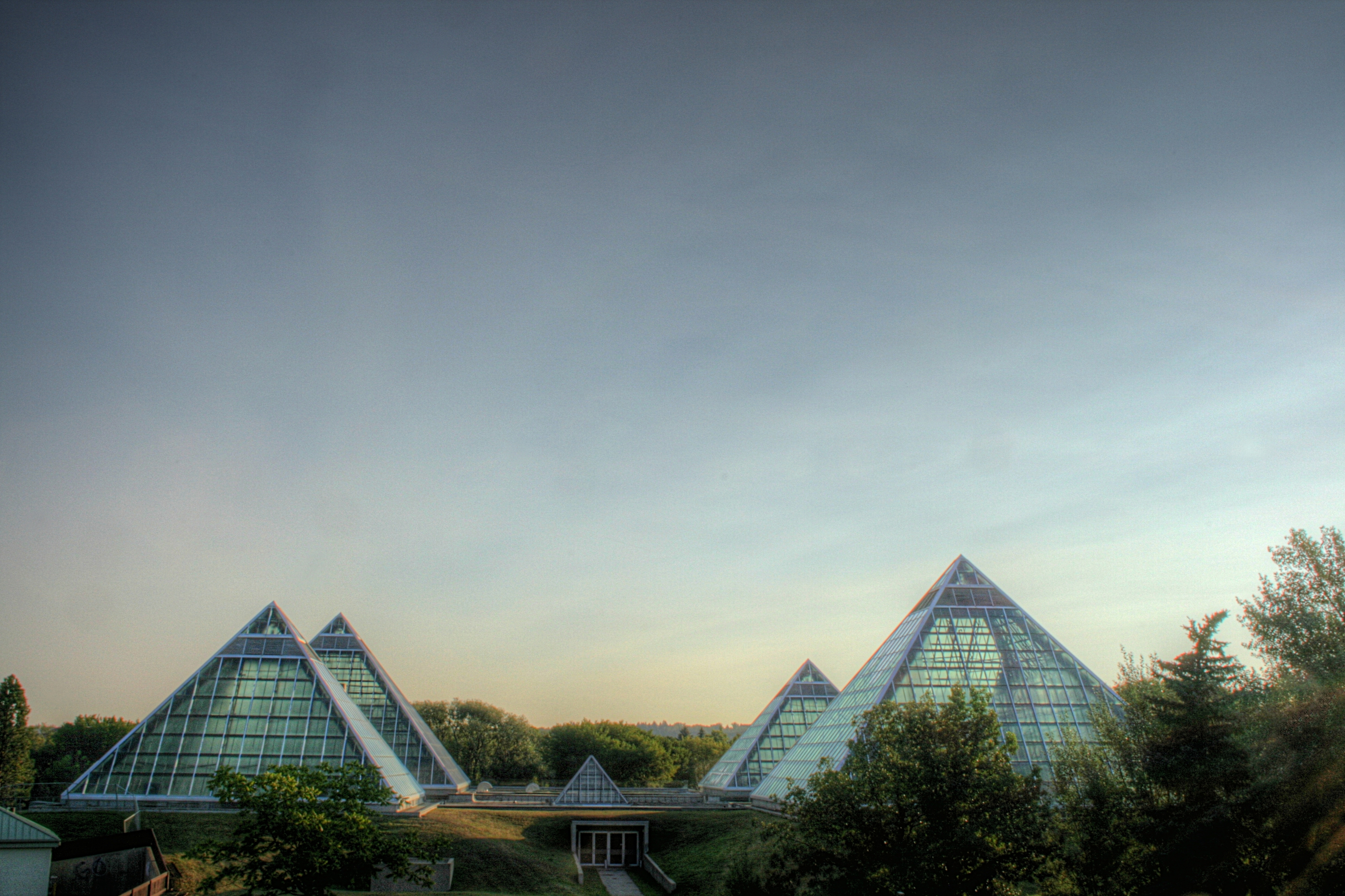
Muttart Conservatory

Few structures in Alberta predate the province's founding in 1905. During the province's early years, many significant projects were designed by eastern firms including those of Ross and MacDonald, E. and W. S. Maxwell, Edward Colonna, John M. Lyle, Brown and Vallance, Burke Horwood and White, and Percy Erskine Nobbs.

For much of the 20th century, the Alberta landscape was dotted with wooden, gable-roofed grain elevators. Authors have referred to prairie elevators as "prairie sentinels" or "prairie cathedrals." These structures existed in most towns and hamlets and became symbols of the Canadian prairies. Alberta's first grain elevator was erected in Strathcona in 1895 by the Brackman-Ker Milling Co. Elevators, which had painted on their sides the names of towns, served as landmarks for rail and car travelers, as well as for BCATP pilots during World War II. In his 1923 book Vers une architecture, French architect Le Corbusier featured a photograph of the concrete Dominion Government Elevator in Calgary, which was demolished in 2011. By 1951 there were 1,651 elevators in the province. However, in the 1960s the traditional grain transportation system began to disappear, and by 2005 only 156 wooden elevators remained. Several, such as those at Andrew, Castor, Leduc, Meeting Creek, Paradise Valley, Radway, Rowley, Scandia and St. Albert have been designated historical sites.

Alberta is home to six grand hotels built by railway companies; some of these are built in the château style, a uniquely Canadian aesthetic. The hotels are the Palliser Hotel, Hotel Macdonald, Banff Springs Hotel, Château Lake Louise, Jasper Park Lodge, and Prince of Wales Hotel. All six remain prominent tourist destinations. Alberta was also home to one of only two buildings in Canada designed by Frank Lloyd Wright: the Banff National Park Pavilion (built 1913–14). The building was, however, destroyed by flood in 1938. In recent years the Town of Banff has made several proposals to reconstruct the building, albeit in a new location, however, none have come to fruition.

Following World War II, Albertan architects embraced the International Style. The firm of Rule Wynn and Rule was founded in Edmonton in 1938 by three University of Alberta graduates, and in 1945 opened a second office in Calgary. Throughout the 1950s and 1960s RWR dominated the province's architectural scene, producing numerous notable commercial and residential structures. In the late 1960s a new generation emerged and sought to develop a uniquely Albertan style of architecture that responded to the province's landscape and culture. These individuals included Douglas Cardinal (1934–), Peter Hemingway (1929–1995), Gordon Atkins (1937–), Jack Long (1925–2001), Donald G. Bittorf (1926–2008), and William E. Boucock. Of this group, Douglas Cardinal became the most famous, going on to gain worldwide recognition for his work.

Perhaps the two most recognizable buildings in Calgary's skyline are the Calgary Tower (William G. Milne, 1968) and the Olympic Saddledome (Graham McCourt, 1983). Edmonton's most recognizable buildings are arguably the Alberta Legislature Building (Allan Merrick Jeffers and Richard Blakey, 1907) and Muttart Conservatory (Peter Hemingway, 1976).

=== Dance ===
Alberta is home to Canada's third largest ballet company, the Alberta Ballet Company. The company was founded in 1958 by Ruth Carse (1916–1999) as Dance Interlude. Carse had been a ballerina with the Canadian Ballet, National Ballet of Canada, and Radio City Music Hall before injury forced her into retirement in 1954. In 1960 it changed its name to the Edmonton Ballet Company, and in 1966 to the Alberta Ballet Company. Since Carse's retirement in 1975, subsequent directors have included Jeremy Leslie-Spinks, Brydon Paige, Ali Pourfarrokh, Mikko Nissinen, and Jean Grand-Maître. In 1990 the company merged with the Calgary City Ballet and relocated to Calgary. It is currently based in St. Mary's Parish Hall.

=== Film ===
During the Golden Age of Hollywood, Alberta was the setting of many films in the Northern genre. Some of these were filmed on location while others were shot in the United States. Examples include Canadian Pacific, Saskatchewan, Northwest Stampede, Blue Canadian Rockies, and The Wild North. Although it takes places in the United States, the 1954 film River of No Return, starring Marilyn Monroe, was filmed in Banff. The 1941 British war film 49th Parallel includes a lengthy sequence shot in Banff National Park. Campbell's Kingdom (1957), starring Dirk Bogarde, is the only feature film to tell a story about the Alberta oil industry.

Alberta has a rapidly burgeoning film industry based largely out of Calgary. During the industry’s nascent years, Alberta's prairie landscape made it a popular location to shoot western films. These include: Days of Heaven (1978), Unforgiven (1992), Legends of the Fall (1994), Open Range (2003), Brokeback Mountain (2005), and The Assassination of Jesse James by the Coward Robert Ford (2007).

In more recent years, the province has played host to many successful films either filmed or set almost entirely within the province. These include: Superman, Superman II, and Superman III (1983), The Revenant (2015), Ghostbusters (2020), Inception (2010), Cool Runnings (1993), The Bourne Legacy (2012), and others.

=== Music ===
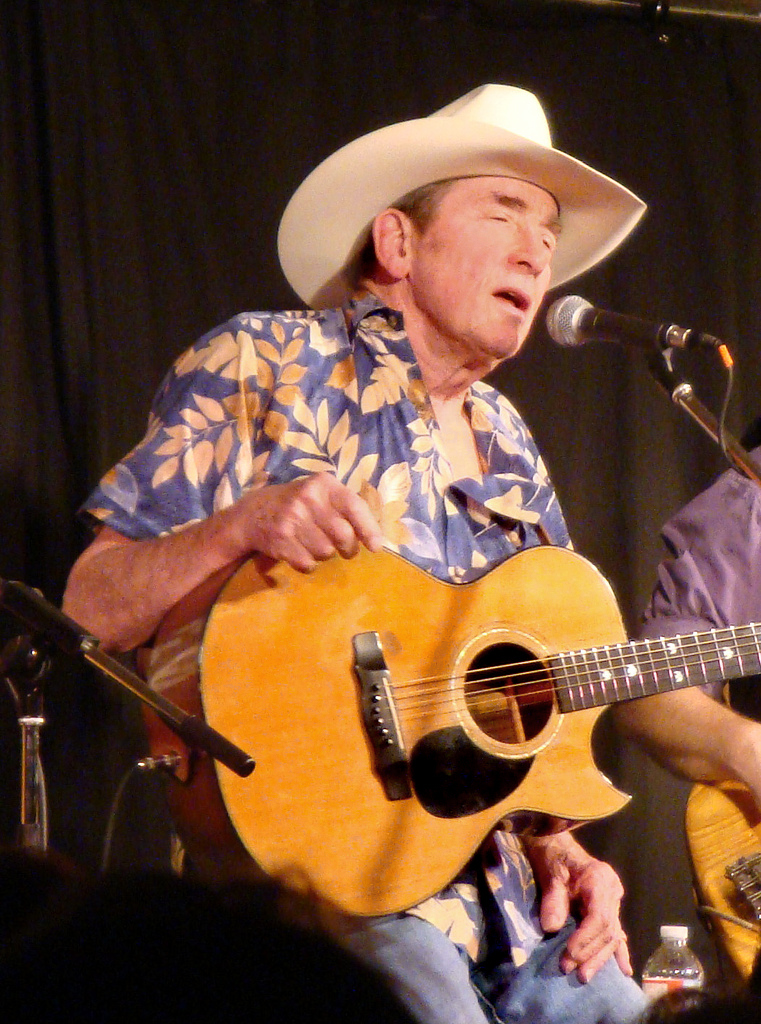
Ian Tyson

Alberta is home to two professional orchestras: the Calgary Philharmonic Orchestra and the Edmonton Symphony Orchestra. The CPO was founded in 1955 upon the merger of two existing groups. From 1957 to 1985 the orchestra's home was the Southern Alberta Jubilee Auditorium, after which time it moved to the new Jack Singer Concert Hall, where it remains today. The EPO was founded in 1952 upon the merger of two groups. From 1952 to 1997 its home was the Northern Alberta Jubilee Auditorium, after which time it moved to the Winspear Centre, where it remains today.

Several prominent classical composers originate from Alberta or have lived there. In 1962, Montreal-born composer Violet Archer (1913–2000) moved to Edmonton after taking a position in the music department at the University of Alberta. Archer remained in Edmonton for the duration of her life and often drew from the Alberta landscape for inspiration. Other Alberta composers include Allan Gordon Bell (1953–) and Allan Gilliland (1965–), both of whom studied under Archer. South African-born composer Malcolm Forsyth lived in Edmonton from 1968 until his death in 2011. Perhaps his best-known composition is Atayoskewin from 1984, which depicts Alberta's northern landscape.

Alberta has long had a vibrant jazz scene. The Edmonton jazz club Yardbird Suite has been in operation since 1984, making it one of the longest-running clubs in the country. It features local, national, and international musicians and has been the site of many live recordings. From 1987 to 2012 Calgary also had a jazz club, the Beat Niq. Perhaps the two most famous jazz musicians from Alberta are saxophonist P. J. Perry (1941–) and pianist Tommy Banks (1936–2018). Perry was born in Red Deer and as a teenager played in his father's band, the Paul Perry Orchestra, at Varsity Hall in Sylvan Lake during the summer months. Banks was born in Calgary and before becoming a senator in 2011 was the host of the television programme The Tommy Banks Show.

The country and western genre plays a significant part in Alberta's music scene. Although born in Victoria, British Columbia, Ian Tyson (1933–) is arguably the province's most famous country musician. In 1963, as part of the duo Ian and Sylvia, Tyson recorded the song "Four Strong Winds", which became one of Canada's most famous songs and whose lyrics explicitly discuss Alberta. Since the late 1960s Tyson has resided on a ranch near Longview, Alberta, and has recorded numerous cowboy-themed albums. Another of Alberta's best-known country and western performers is Corb Lund (1969–) and his band The Hurtin' Albertans. Lund's songs regularly discuss Albertan subjects. Gord Bamford, although born in Australia, grew up and still resides in Alberta.

A number of successful pop musicians and bands have come from Alberta. These include performers Jann Arden (1962–), k.d. Lang (1961–), Joni Mitchell (1943–), Feist (1976–), and bands Loverboy, The Stampeders, Nickelback, The Dudes, and Tegan and Sara.

An important musical institution is the province-wide CKUA Radio Network. The station originated in 1927 when the Extension Department of the University of Alberta purchased the licence to CFCK. CKUA is fully donor funded, and its programming includes all types of music. Since 2012 the station has been based at the newly renovated Alberta Hotel at 9804 Jasper Avenue. CKUA also has a satellite broadcast location in the King Edward Hotel in Calgary.

=== Painting ===
The first visual art produced in Alberta was made the members of Aboriginal tribes such as the Blackfoot, Sarcee, and Nakota. Blackfoot pictographic art was made on media such as tipis, rock, and robes, and recurring subjects include spiritualism and inter-tribal war. One of the best-preserved examples of Aboriginal art in Alberta is at Writing-on-Stone Provincial Park near Lethbridge.

The first European artist to travel to Alberta was Paul Kane, who visited the province thrice in the late 1840s. Kane was enthralled by the expanse of the land and portrayed the west as romantic and exotic. Romanticisation of the landscape would remain a prominent feature throughout much of the province's artistic history. In 1859 Kane published an account of his journeys entitled Wanderings of an Artist Among the Indians of North America. Other European artists, such as James Alden and William Hind, journeyed to Alberta in the mid-19th century and produced romantic depictions of the land, similar to those of Kane. Watercolour was the preferred medium at this time as it was fast-drying and easily transportable.

Following the completion of the Canadian Pacific Railway in 1885, the company's president William Van Horne began giving free passes to artists. Paintings produced by these artists would serve to promote travel to the newly-accessible region. Early artists to travel to the west on the CPR included John Fraser, Lucius O'Brien, Robert Ford Gagen, John A. Hammond, and Frederic Bell-Smith. Most of their paintings depict the mountains rather than the prairies.

In the years following World War I, Alberta artists began to establish institutions to support their craft. The first art classes in Alberta were held at the Provincial Institute of Technology and Art in Calgary in 1921. Teachers included Lars Jonson Haukaness (1927–1929), Alfred Crocker Leighton (1929–1935), and Henry George Glyde (1936–1946). Students to come out of the two-year programme included William Leroy Stevenson, Maxwell Bates, and Marion Nicoll. Numerous art clubs formed around this time as well, included in Edmonton Art Association (1914), Lethbridge Sketch Club (1936), Medicine Hat Art Club (1945), and the Red Deer Art Club (late-1940s). Crucially, in 1935 art classes began at the Banff School of Fine Arts, which remains a vital artistic institution in Alberta today. An important guest at the Medicine Hat club was Walter J. Phillips. The most famous artist to originate from Medicine Hat was Roloff Beny. Several new galleries also opened in this era, including the Edmonton Museum of Arts (1924) and the Canadian Art Galleries (1945). All members of the Group of Seven (excluding Franklin Carmichael and Frederick Varley) painted in Alberta. A. Y. Jackson was the only member to paint prairie landscapes as well as mountains. In the 1940s and 50s, a new generation of Aboriginal artists — including Gerald Tailfeathers and Percy Two Gun — began depicting their communities using European techniques and tools.

Prior to the 1960s, only a select few artists painted in the modernist style. These included Bates, Stevenson, and Nicoll, as well as Stanford Perrott, Jock Macdonald, Helen Stadelbauer, Ron Spickett, and Roy Kiyooka. The Emma Lake Artists' Workshops of the 1950s helped to spread modernism. Guests at the workshops included Will Barnet and Barnett Newman. In 1960, the new University of Calgary — which until 1966 was a satellite campus of the University of Alberta — had from its inception an art programme. Faculty included Helen Stadelbauer, Eric Dodd, Harry Kiyooka, Ken Esler, and Ron Spickett.

Following the 1960s, modernism and abstraction took a prominent place in the Alberta arts scene. Many new galleries emerged, including the Walter Phillips Gallery (1976), the Nickle Arts Museum (1979), the Medicine Hat Art Gallery (1967), and the Muttart Art Gallery (1977). In 1975 a large collection of Alberta art was showcased at Canada House in London, and was introduced by Premier Peter Lougheed's wife Jeanne. Important post-1960 artists include Robert Scott, Graham Peacock, Douglas Haynes, John Brocke, and Takao Tanabe. Although he spend much of his career in Saskatchewan, Ted Godwin remained an important member of the Albertan art community.

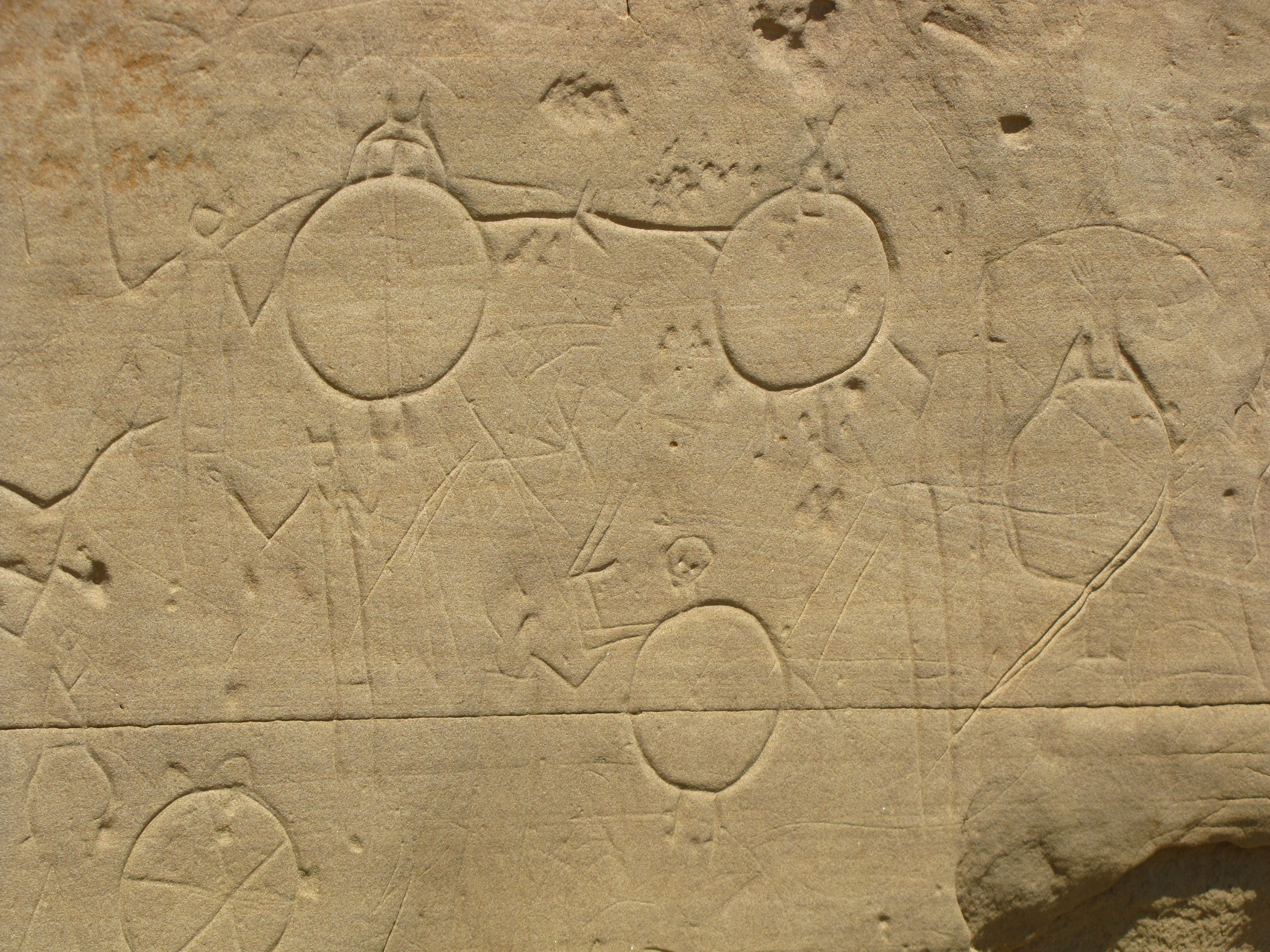
Petroglyph of men with shields, Writing-on-Stone

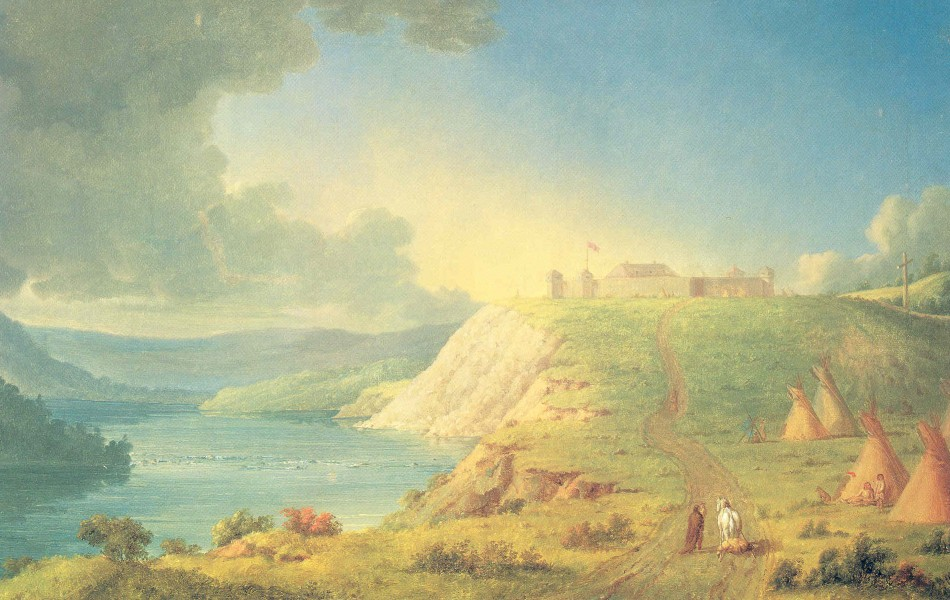
Fort Edmonton by Paul Kane (c. 1849–56)

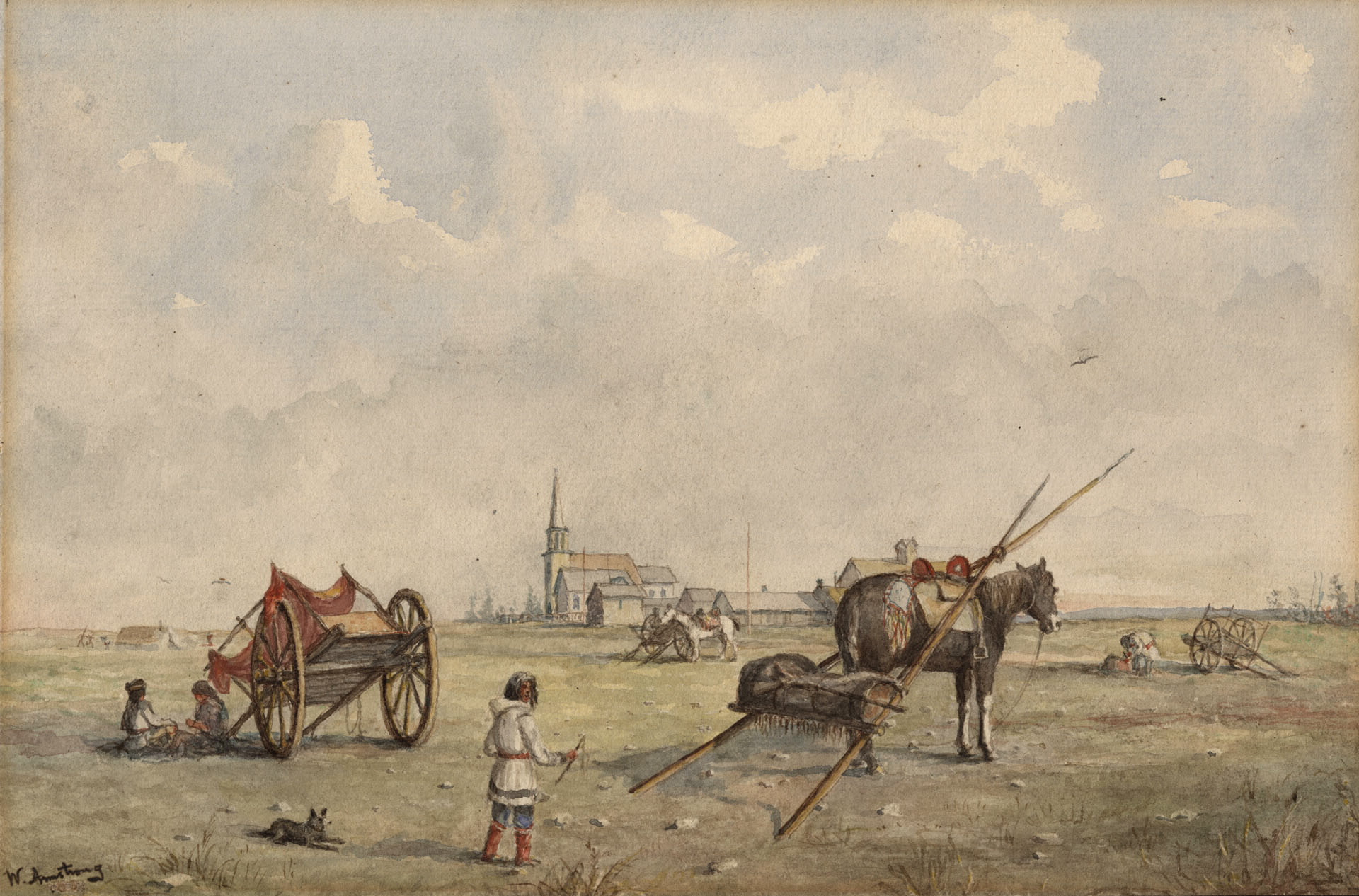
Fort Macleod, Alberta by William Armstrong (1902)

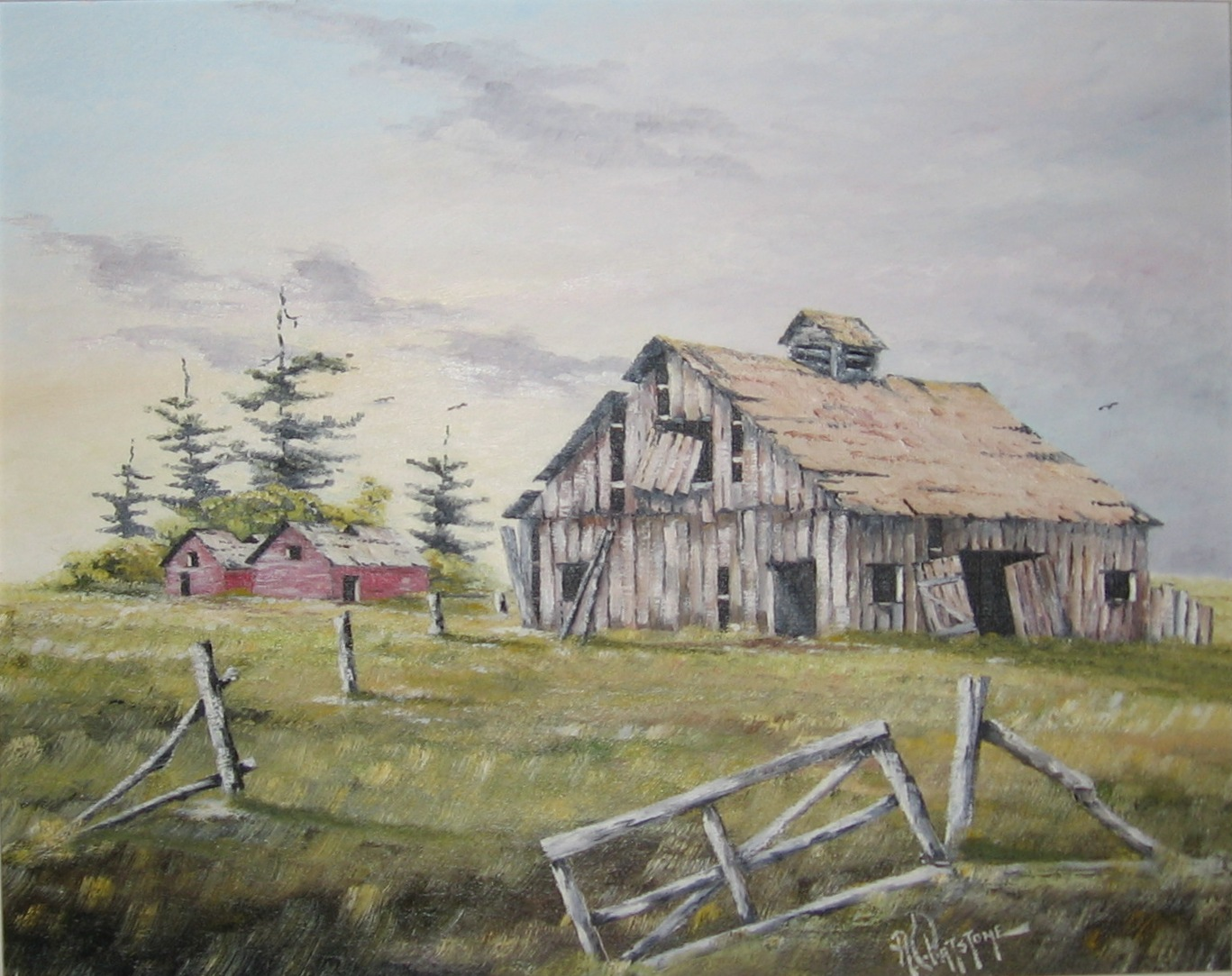
Prairie Companions by Alfred C. Patstone (1972)

== Sport ==
=== Football ===
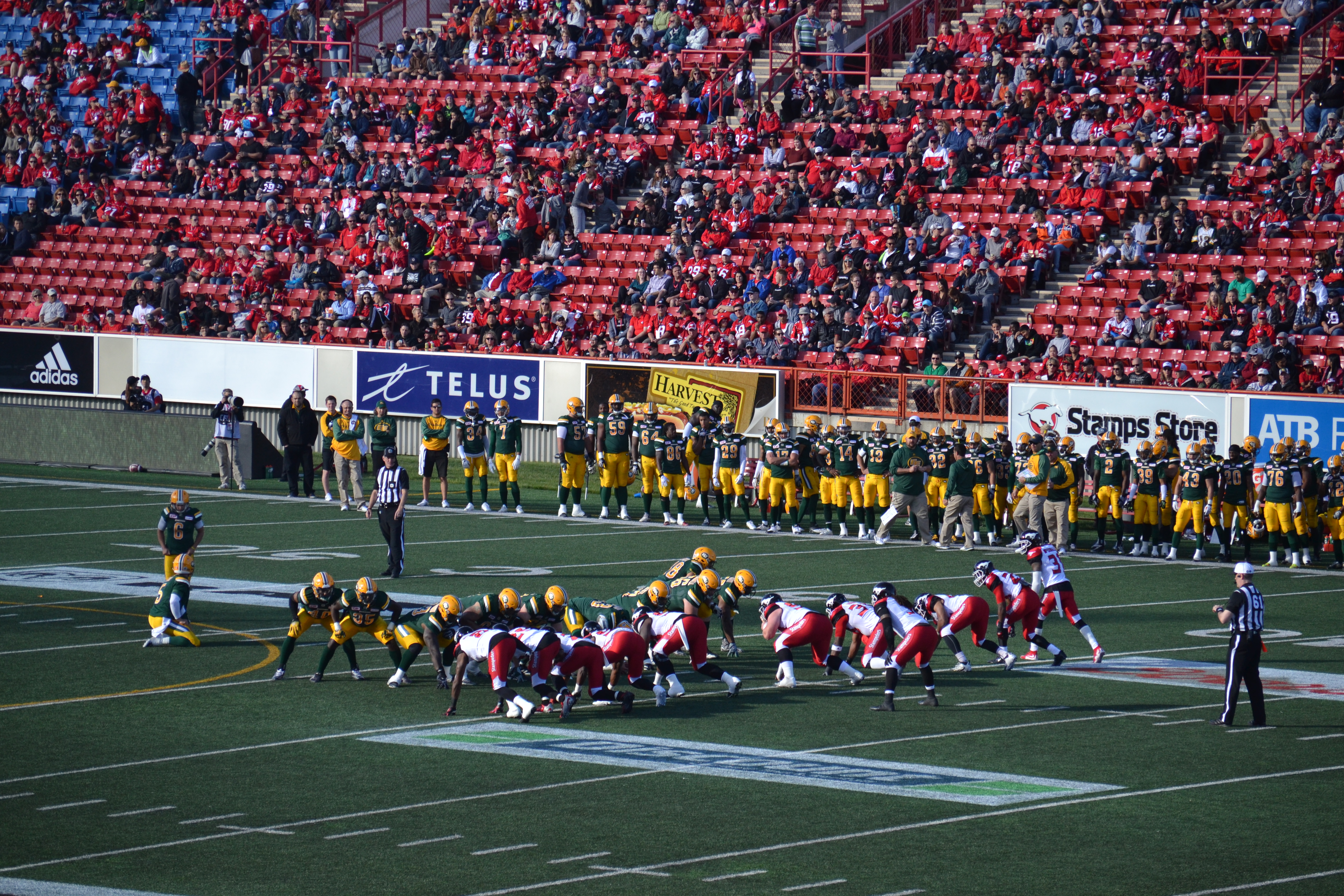
Edmonton Eskimos play Calgary Stampeders at McMahon Stadium

A central element of sporting culture in Alberta is the rivalry between teams from Edmonton and Calgary, known as the "Battle of Alberta". This rivalry exists across multiple sports and leagues. Calgary and Edmonton teams have competed against one another in football since around the 1890s. Rivalries between the cities existed via various Calgary and Edmonton clubs that participated in the Alberta Rugby Football Union. Following World War II, the Calgary Stampeders and Edmonton Eskimos formed, in 1948 and 1949 respectively, both of whom played in the Western Interprovincial Football Union, the precursor to the modern CFL West Division. The Stampeders and Eskimos quickly developed into rivals. Every year since 1949 (excluding 1954–1958, 1964–1967, 1973, and 1981), the two clubs have competed against one another in the "Labour Day Classic", which is arguably the province's paramount annual sporting event. The game has always been played in Calgary, with the exception of the years 1949, 1952, and 1953. A newer tradition formed later, the "Labour Day Rematch", in which Edmonton hosts Calgary the week after Labour Day. This game was first played in 1989 and has been held annually since 1992. In 1948 the Calgary Stampeders competed in their first Grey Cup. Along with the team, a delegation from Calgary chartered a train to Toronto to support the team. This delegation took with it a full car of livestock and chuckwagons. Notoriously, members of the Stampeders delegation rode a horse into the lobby of the Royal York after disembarking at Union Station. The ritual of riding a horse into a hotel in the host city is a tradition Calgarians continue today when the Stampeders play in the Grey Cup.

=== Hockey ===
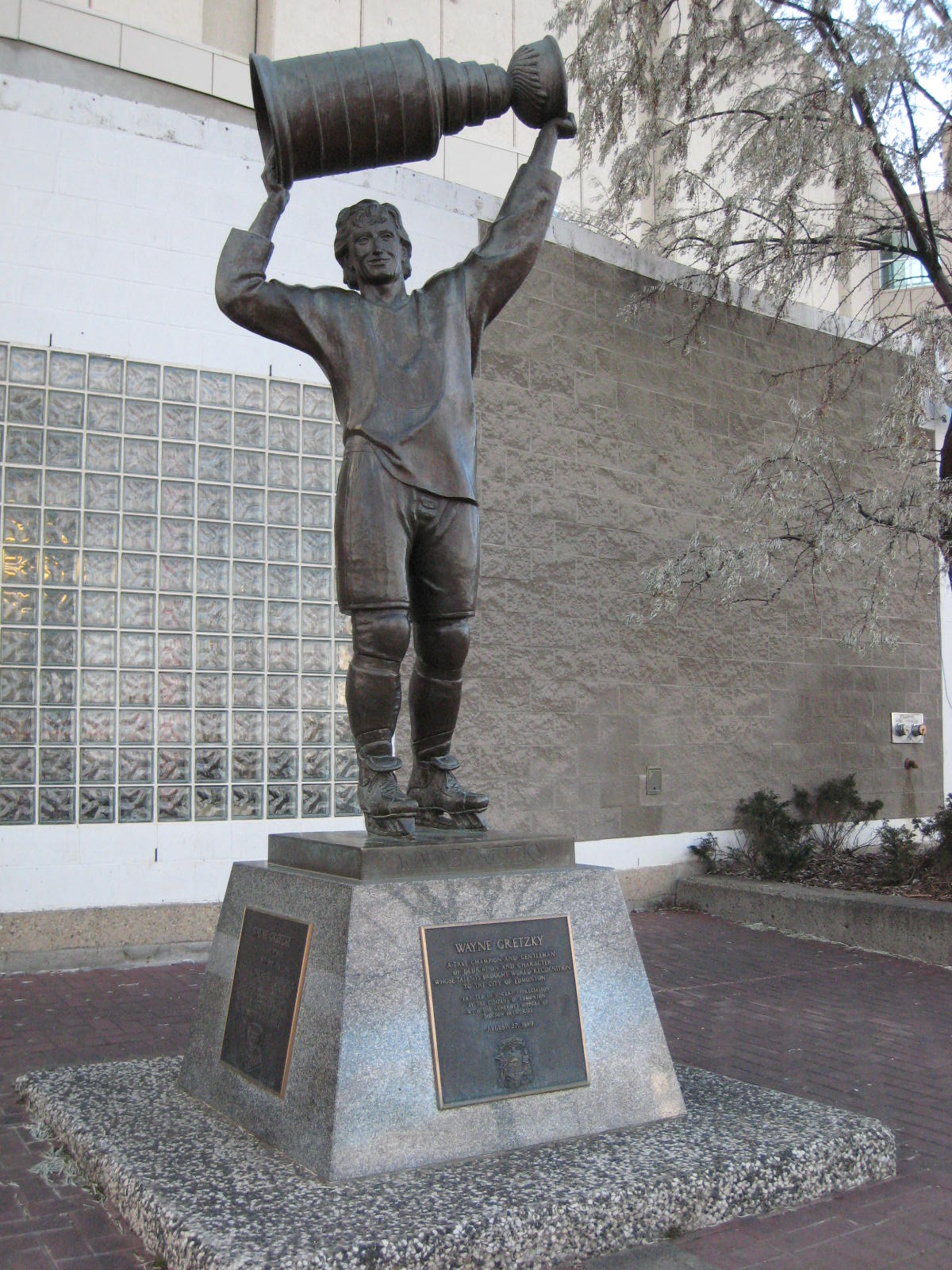
Bronze statue of Wayne Gretzky

Calgary and Edmonton have likewise competed against one another in hockey since the 1890s. Teams in senior leagues such as the Western Canada Hockey League, and junior leagues such as the Western Hockey League, played against one another for most of the 20th century. It was not until the 1980s, however, that both cities had professional teams that could sustain a rivalry. The Edmonton Oilers first played in the 1972–73 season of the World Hockey Association. After that league folded in the summer of 1979, the Oilers joined the NHL for the 1979–80 season. The Calgary Flames began life as the Atlanta Flames in the 1972–73 season of the National Hockey League, and after a group of Calgary businessmen bought the team, the club relocated to Calgary for the 1980–81 season. The Flames played their first three seasons in the Stampede Corral before moving to the Olympic Saddledome for the 1983–84 season. The golden age of the Flames-Oilers rivalry was the late 1980s, when the two teams were at the pinnacle of their power. During this era both clubs featured a balance of skill and toughness that resulted in many high-scoring, fight-filled games. From 1983 to 1990, the Stanley Cup Final included either the Oilers or Flames. Since the 1980s, the teams have not been competitive simultaneously, which has meant that the rivalry has diminished to an extent. Edmonton last played in the Stanley Cup Final in 2025, while Calgary last played in the Final in 2004. Unquestionably the greatest sports star in Alberta's history is Wayne Gretzky, who played for the Edmonton Oilers from 1979 to 1988.

Junior hockey leagues such as the Western Hockey League and the Alberta Junior Hockey League play an important cultural role in the province's small towns.

=== Rodeo and chuckwagons ===
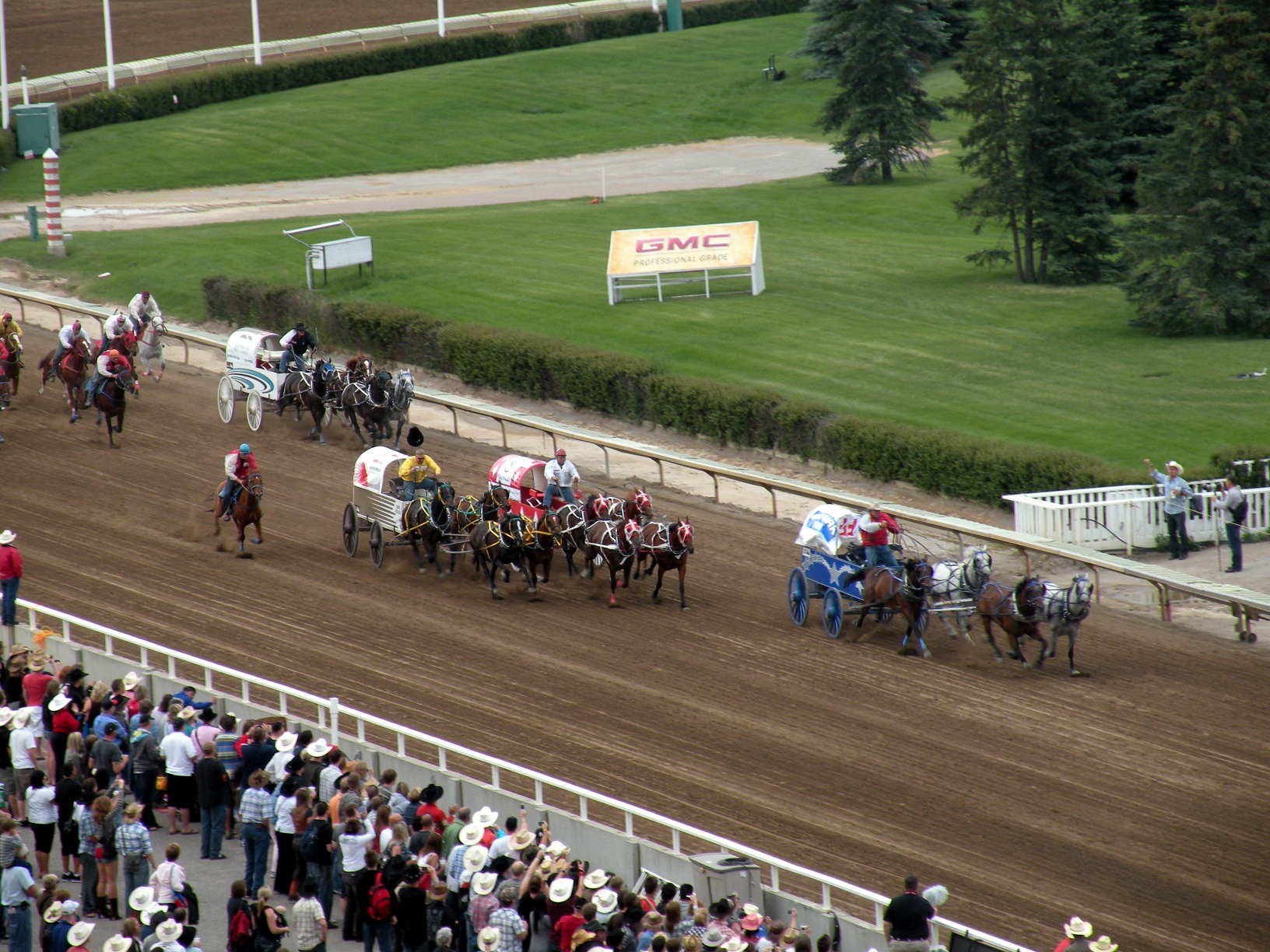
Chuckwagon racing at the Calgary Stampede

The first rodeo in Canada was held in Raymond, Alberta in 1902, and was organized by Ray Knight. The sport soon became popular across the province and in 1912 Guy Weadick along with businessmen Pat Burns, George Lane, A. J. McLean, and A. E. Cross — collectively known as the "Big Four" — added the first Calgary Stampede to the Calgary Exhibition, which had existed since 1886. The event has taken place annually since then and remains the city's greatest tourist attraction. The province hosts the majority of rodeos in the Canadian Professional Rodeo Association season. Other larger rodeos include the Ponoka Stampede and the Guy Weadick Days in High River.

The sport of chuckwagon racing was invented by Guy Weadick, and formal races were first held at the 1923 Calgary Stampede under the name the "Rangeland Derby". The majority of races during the World Professional Chuckwagon Association (WPCA) season take place in Alberta.

=== Skiing ===
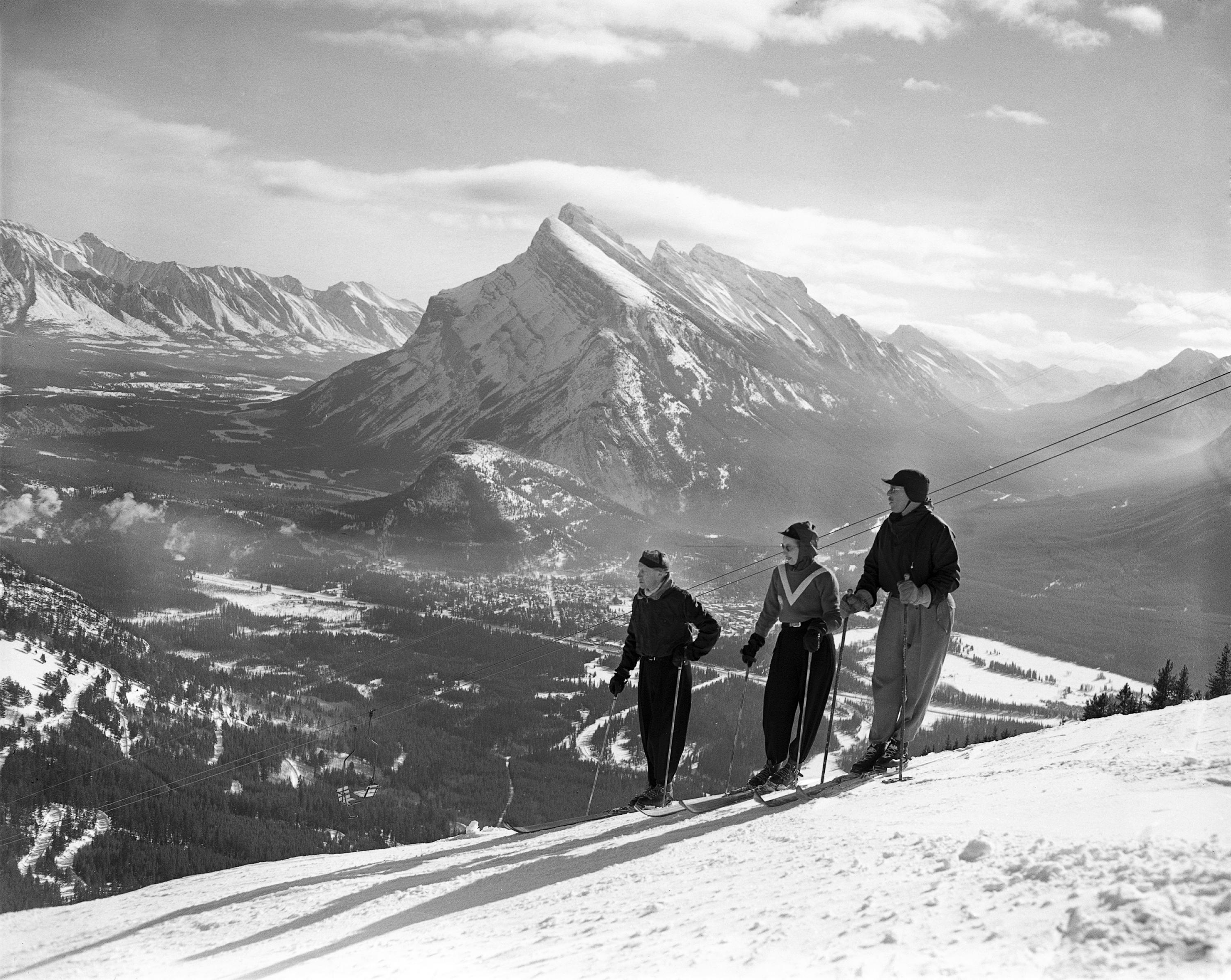
Mt. Norquay

Alberta is bounded on the west by the Canadian Rockies, and consequently, possesses some of the world's finest skiing destinations. During the winter, many Albertans spend their weekends in the mountains. Major ski hills include Sunshine Village, Lake Louise, Nakiska, Mount Norquay, Castle Mountain, and Marmot Basin. The alpine skiing at the 1988 Olympics was held at Nakiska. Calgary is home to Canada Olympic Park, which includes the ski jump and bobsleigh track that were used for the 1988 Olympics.

== Cuisine ==
=== Food ===
Alberta's ranches contain just over 40% of the country's beef cattle herd. Accordingly, beef is one of the province's most prominent foods. One of Alberta's most famous restaurants is Hy's Steakhouse, which was founded in Calgary in 1955 by Hy Aisenstat, and has since opened restaurants in several other Canadian cities. Other iconic steakhouses include the Longview Steakhouse and Caesars Steakhouse. Historically, most small towns in the province had a Chinese café on their main streets, and Canadian-Chinese cuisine remains an important food tradition. The dish ginger beef was invented in the 1970s by chef George Wong at the Silver Inn in Calgary. In central Alberta, which has a large population of Eastern-European descent, pierogies are a popular food. Pierogies are often served in Ukrainian churches and community halls in small towns. During Stampede week in Calgary, communities across the city host free pancake breakfasts to celebrate the event.

Signature ingredients of Alberta include honey, canola, Red Fife wheat, Saskatoon berries, and root vegetables. Alberta is the fifth-largest honey-producing region in the world, producing 40 million pounds of honey a year, which is half the total production of Canada. Albertan honey is distinct for its white colour and creamy consistency due to local red clover and alfalfa. Canola, short for "Canadian oil", was developed in Alberta, and the province produces 15 million tonnes annually. Red Fife wheat was the first breed of wheat to grow in Canada, is credited for having saved pioneers from starvation, and can be found in Alberta bakeries in sourdough loaves, baguettes, croissants, and more. Saskatoon berries are indigenous to Alberta, are typically used in jams, jellies, pies, and butter tarts, and have historically been used for tea and to make pemmican.

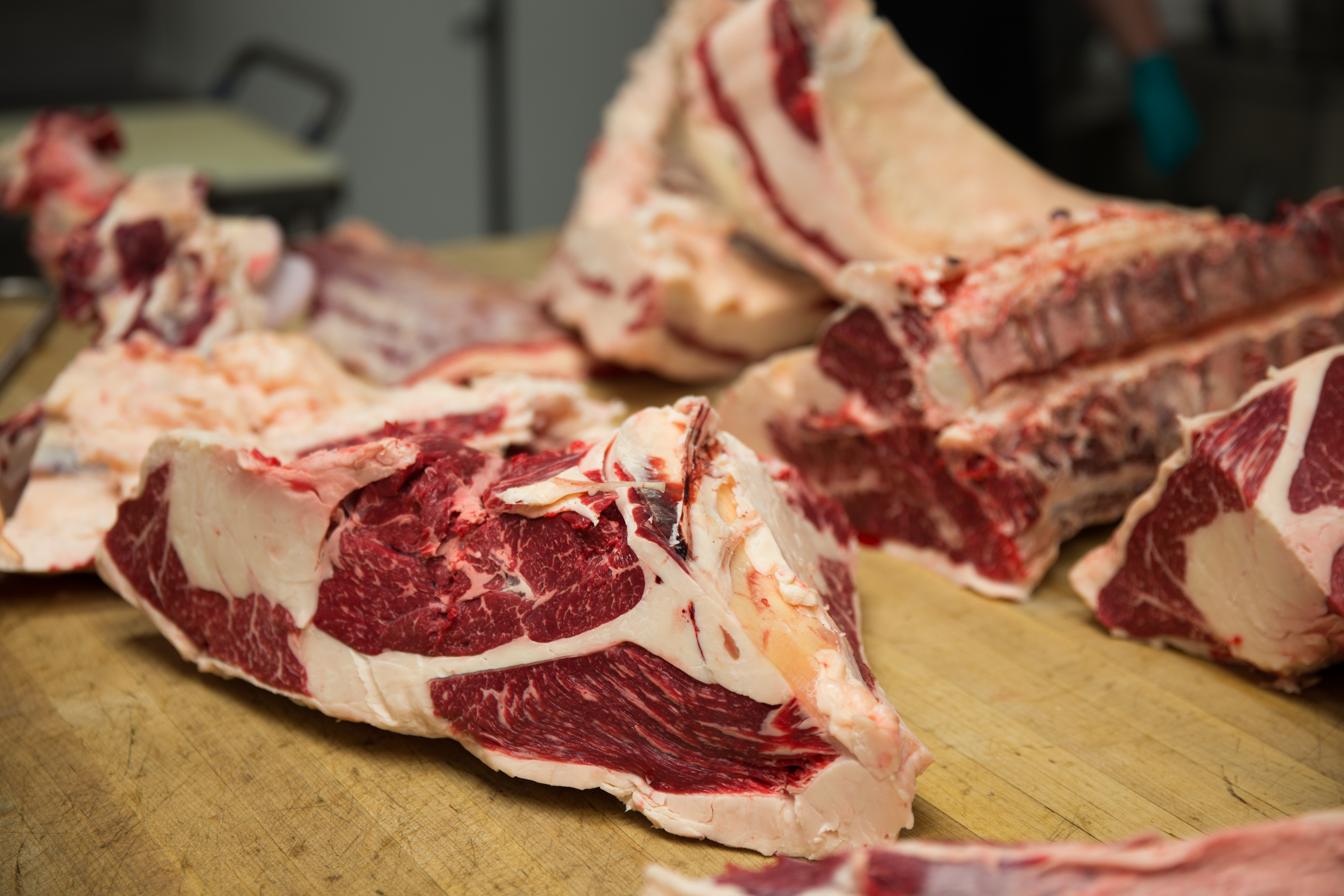
Alberta beef

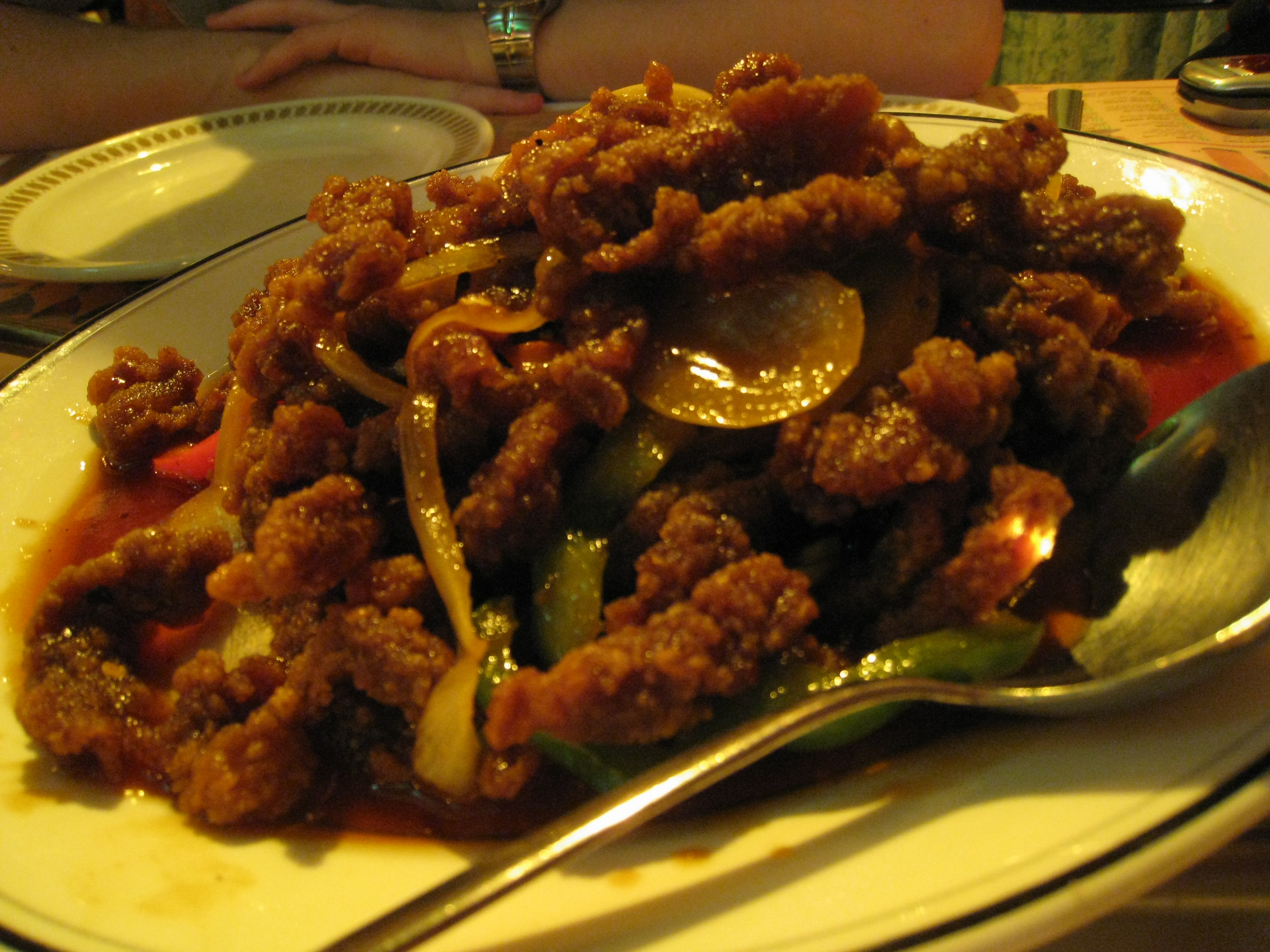
Ginger beef

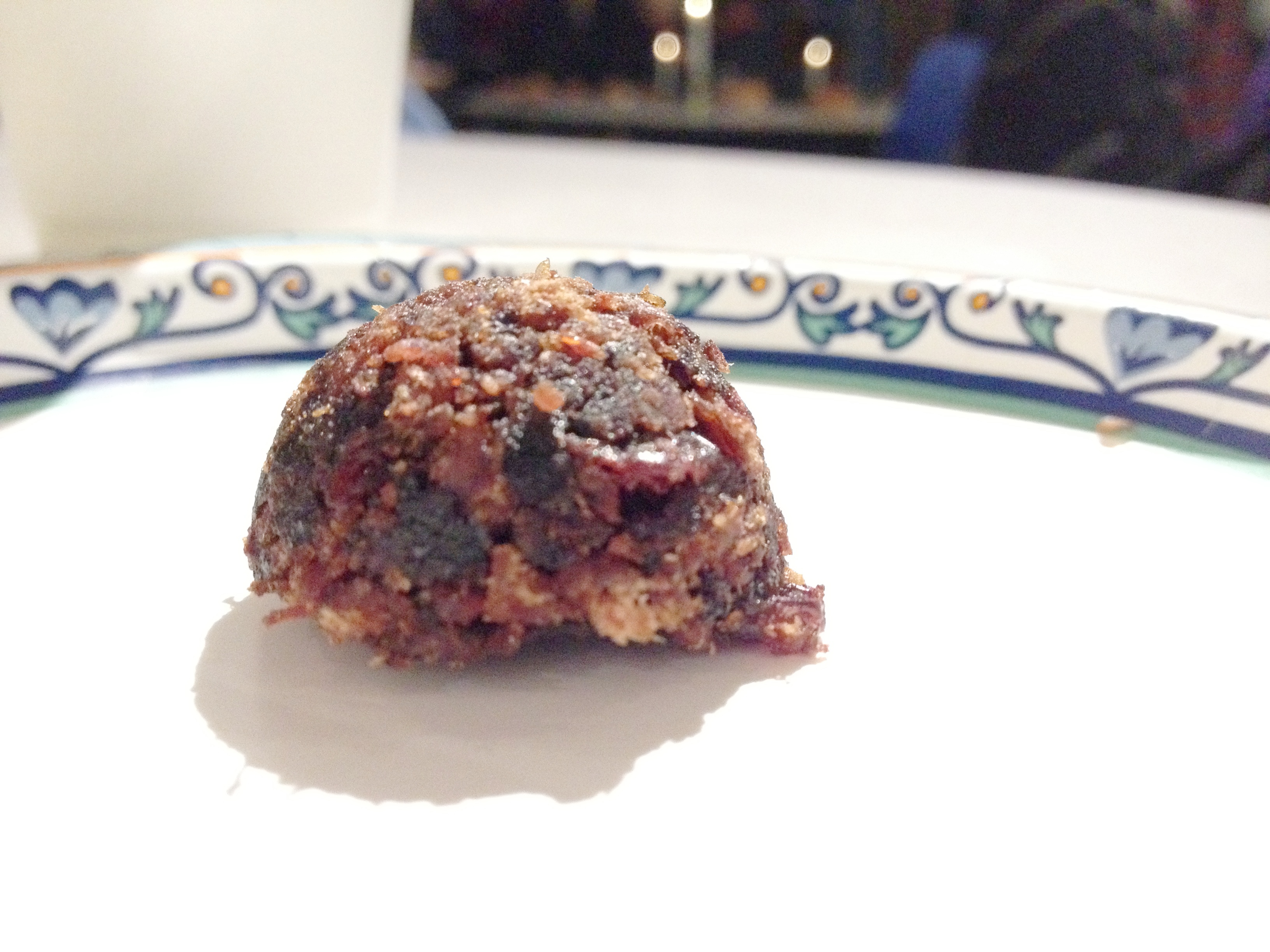
Pemmican

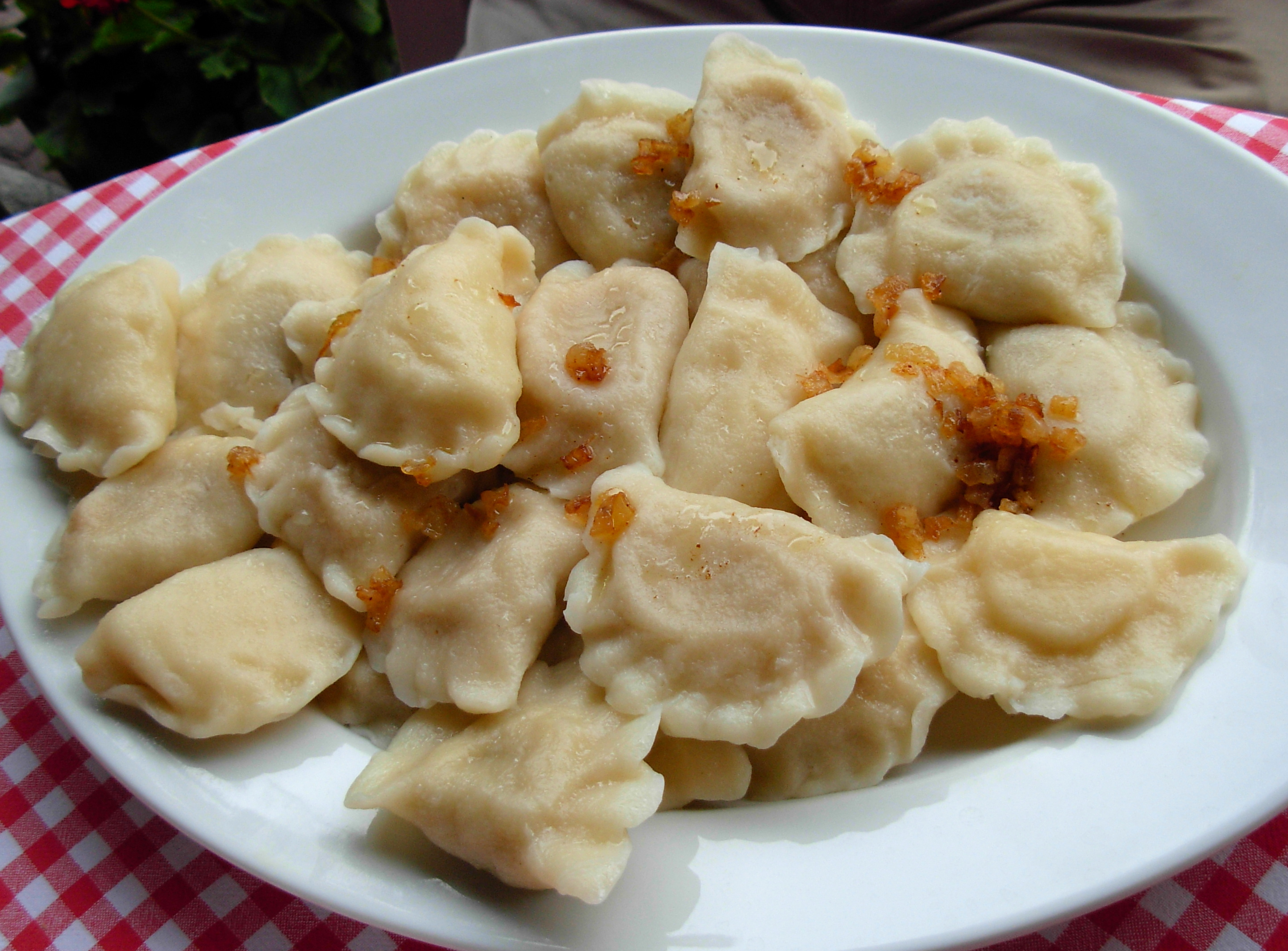
Pierogies

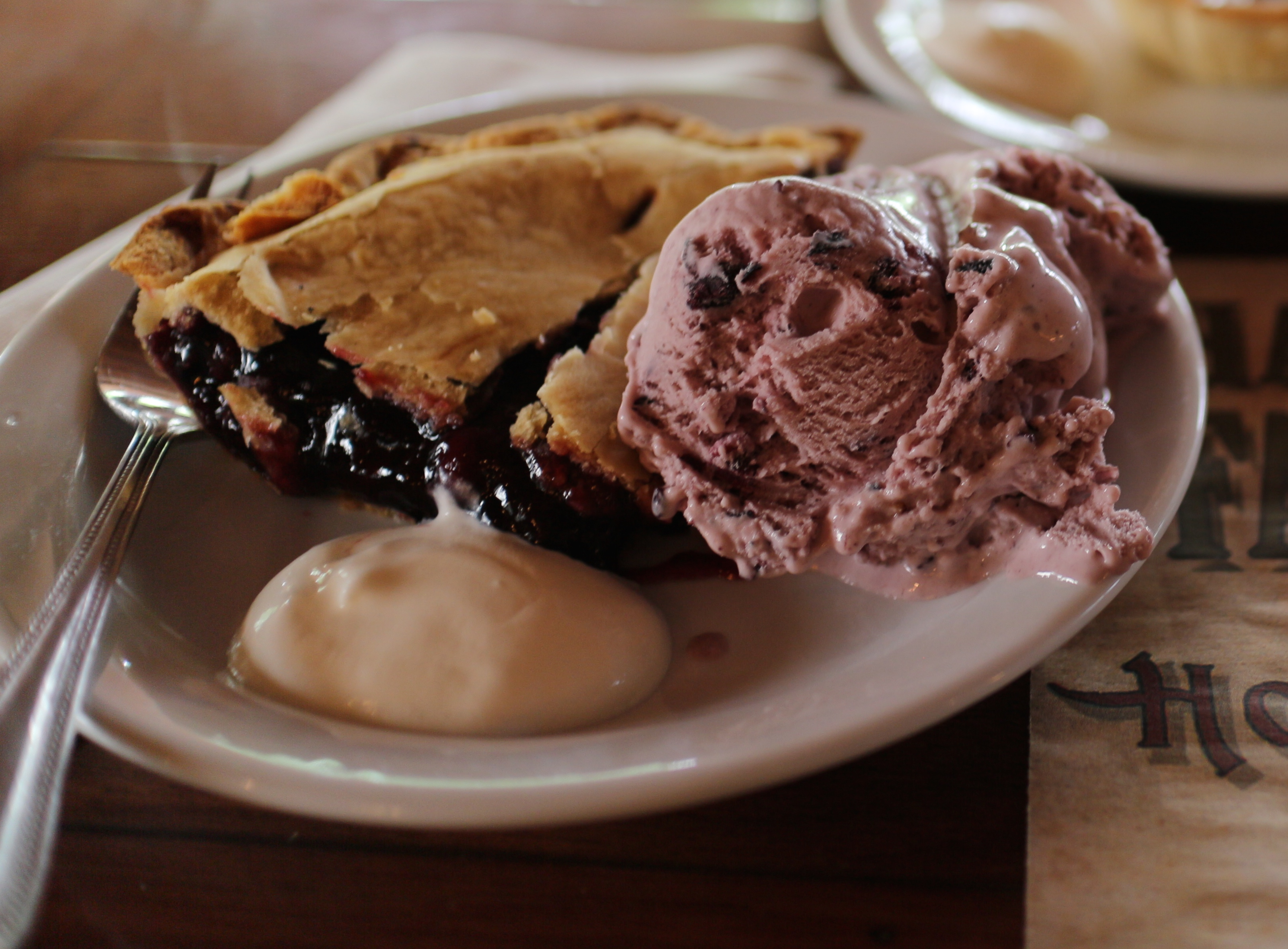
Saskatoon berry pie

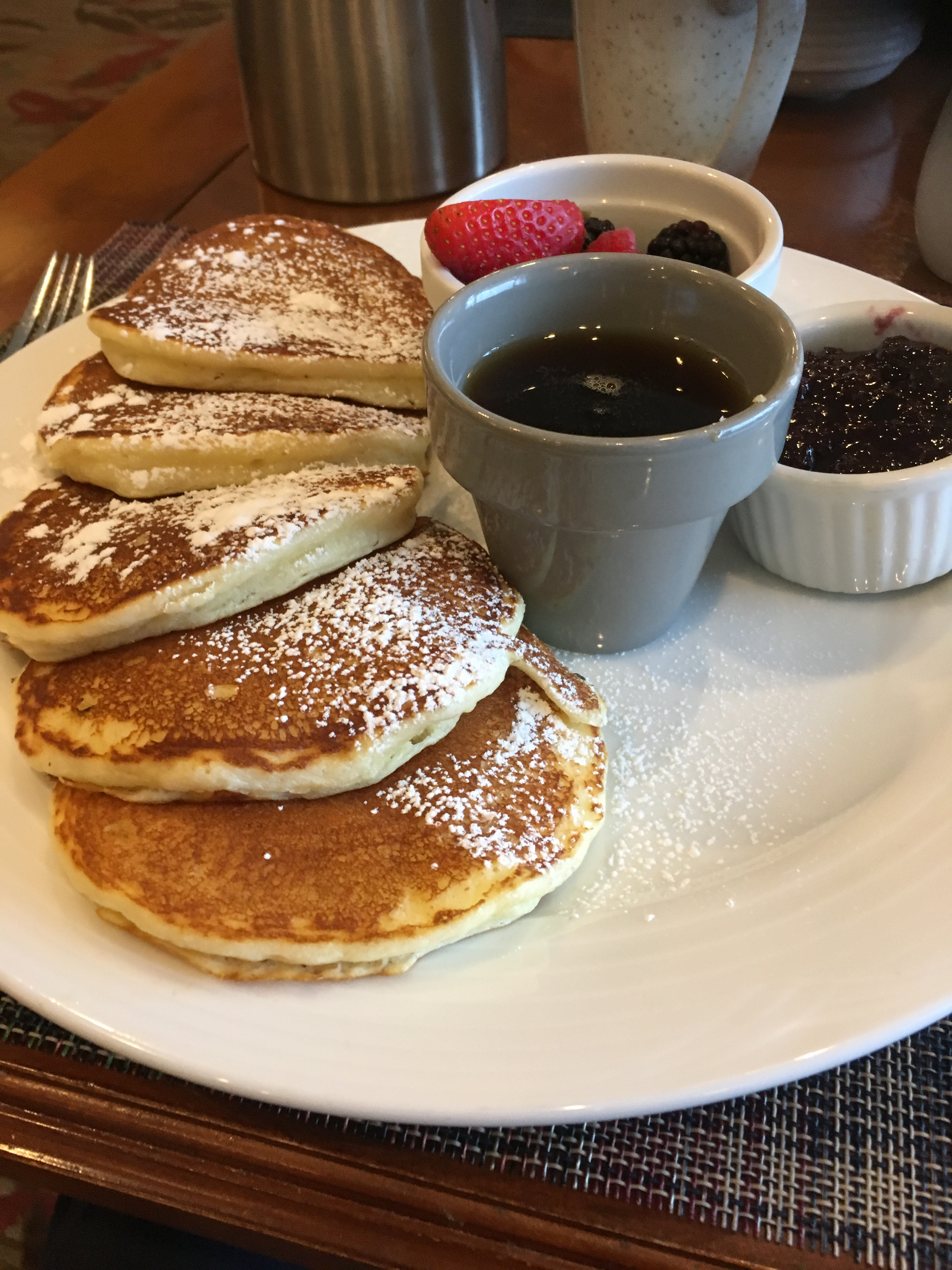
Pancake breakfast

=== Drink ===
The oldest distillery in the province is Alberta Distillers, which was founded in 1946 by Frank McMahon and George H. Reifel. Alberta Distillers' best-known product is Alberta Premium, a 100% rye-grain whiskey. The cocktail "Bloody Caesar", or simply "Caesar", was invented at the Calgary Inn (now The Westin Calgary) in 1969 by bartender Walter Chell (1926–1997). This drink has since become one of the most popular cocktails in Canada.

Alberta's most famous beer is Old Style Pilsner, which was first brewed in 1926 by Fritz Sick at Sick's Breweries in Lethbridge. The recipe was bought in 1958 by Molson and the beer is no longer brewed in Alberta, however, it remains a popular drink in the province. Another historic beer is Calgary Beer, which was first brewed in 1892 by the Calgary Brewing and Malting Company, founded by A. E. Cross. Its iconic "buffalo head and horseshoe" logo was for decades a prominent emblem of the city and appeared on the jerseys of many sports teams. As with Old Style Pilsner, Calgary Beer is no longer brewed in the city and is only available for purchase in Saskatchewan. One of Edmonton's historic breweries was Northwest Brewing, which had been founded by Robert Oschner in 1894 as Strathcona Brewing before changing its name in 1923. Its most popular product was Bohemian Maid Beer. The brewery closed in 1975. The area around the former Edmonton Brewing and Malting Company has been redeveloped as the Brewery District. Newer Alberta breweries whose beers are popular include Big Rock Brewery, Wild Rose Brewery, and Alley Kat Brewing.

Alberta is also the origin of several well-known cocktails. The B-52, invented at the Banff Springs Hotels, is a layered shot composed of coffee liqueur, Irish cream, and Grand Marnier (substitutes include triple sec or Cointreau). The Angry Canadian, invented in Calgary, is an Old Fashioned variety made with Canadian rye whiskey, bitters, club soda or water, and pure maple syrup.

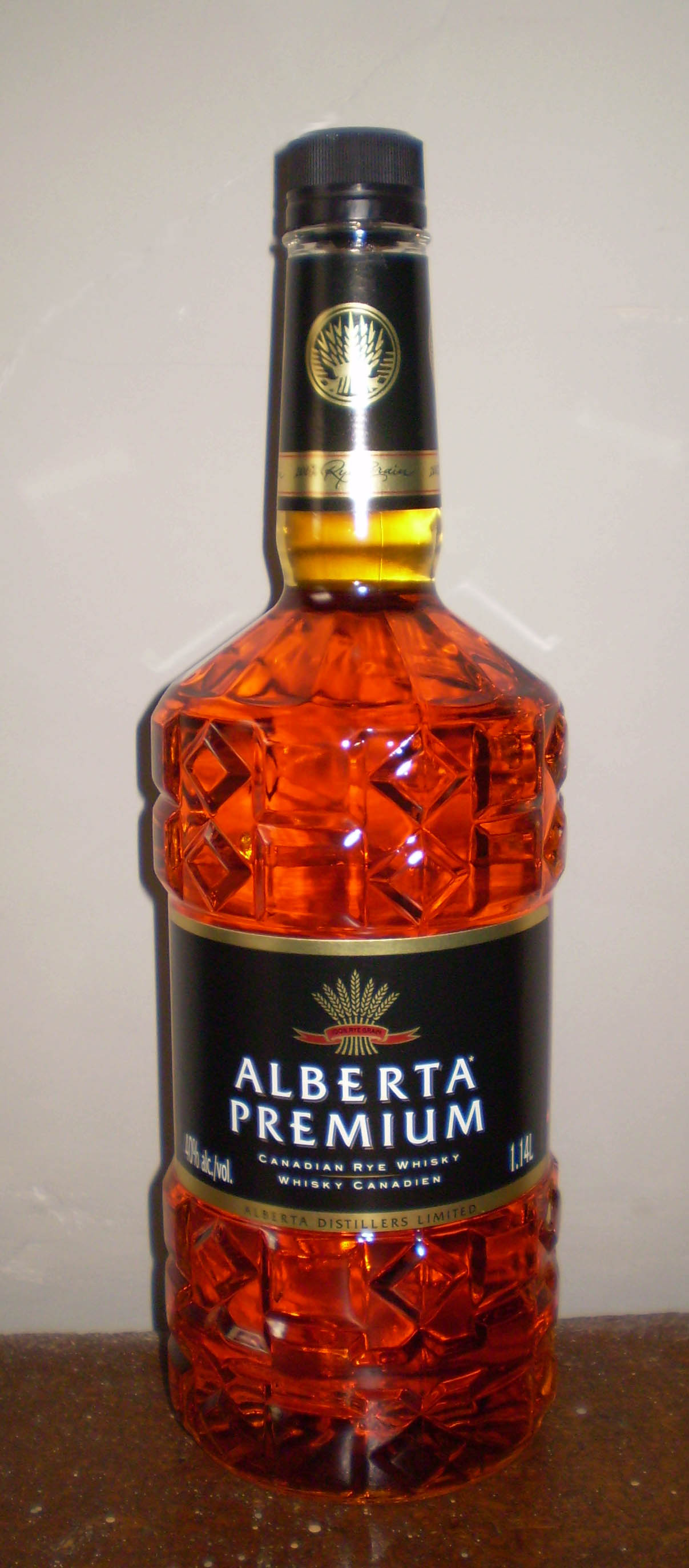
Alberta Premium whisky

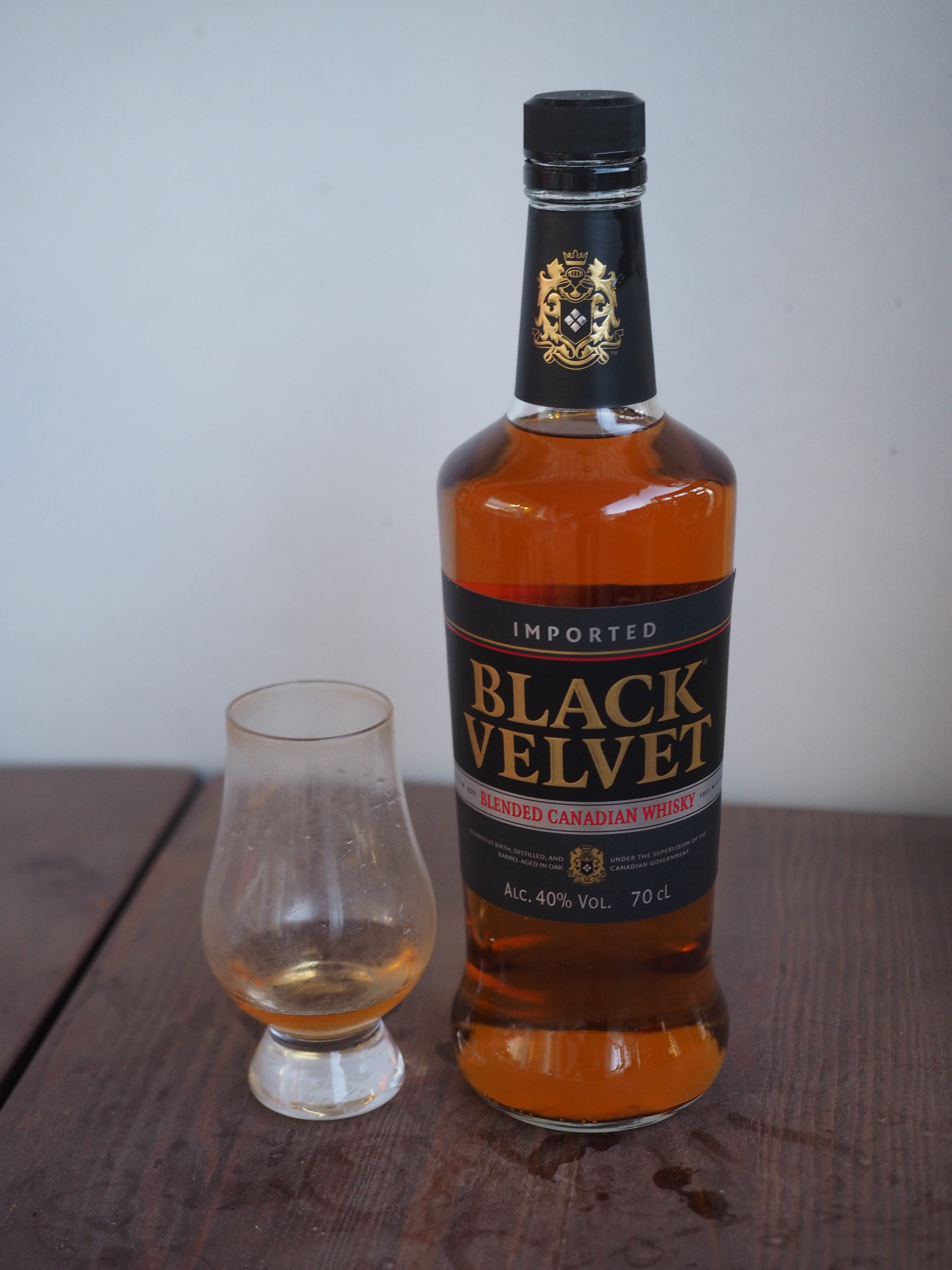
Black Velvet whisky

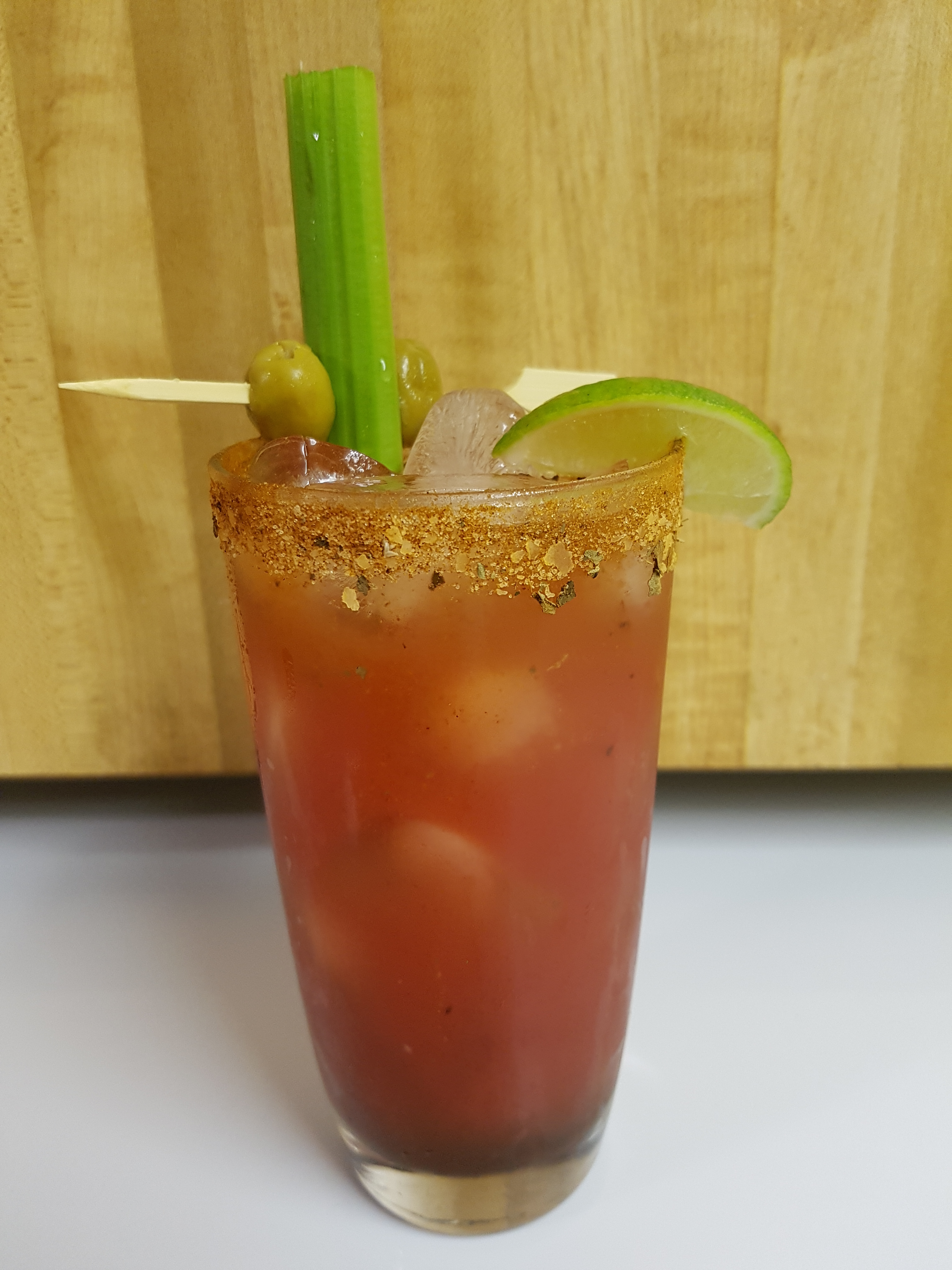
Bloody Caesar

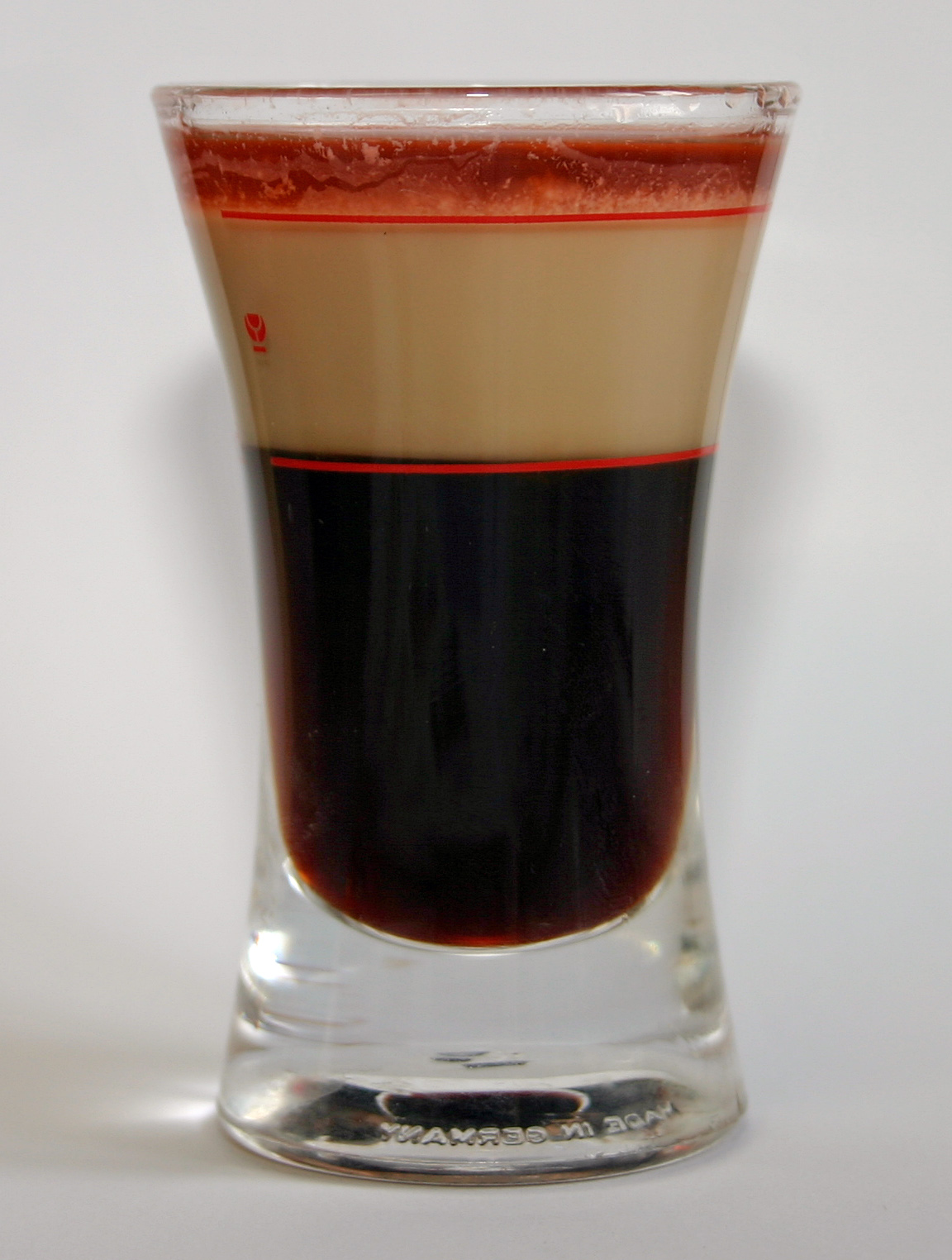
B-52 cocktail

== Costume ==
Albertans often don western wear for public events. In Calgary, many citizens wear cowboy hats and boots during Stampede week in July. Since 1950, Calgary has presented its "White Hat" to visiting dignitaries upon their arrival. The official manufacturer of the Calgary White Hat is Smithbilt Hats. Smithbilt was founded in 1919 by Morris Schumiatcher, who had immigrated to Canada from Russia in 1910, and for 100 years has been the city's preeminent manufacturer of cowboy hats. Two major western wear retailers were started in Alberta: Riley and McCormick, founded in 1901, and Lammle's, founded in 1983. During World War I, Riley and McCormick provided saddles for the Russian cavalry, and in 1919 when the Prince of Wales purchased his E.P. Ranch, fully equipped its staff.

== Symbols ==
=== Decorative symbols ===
Coat of Arms of Alberta

Alberta's coat of arms was granted a royal warrant by King Edward VII on 30 May 1907. Originally, the coat of arms consisted exclusively of an escutcheon (shield). At the top of the escutcheon is a Saint George's Cross, which alludes to the arms of the Hudson's Bay Company, which formerly controlled the territory that is now Alberta. Below the cross are, from foreground to background, a wheat field, a grass prairie, foothills, and the Rocky Mountains. On 30 July 1980, Queen Elizabeth II granted a second royal warrant which augmented the shield with supporters, a crest, and motto. These elements include a beaver (representing Canada), a lion (representing the monarchy), and a pronghorn antelope (representing the province proper). The motto in the arms is "fortis et liber," or "strong and free."

On 1 June 1968, Alberta adopted its official flag. The flag consists of the province's shield centred on an ultramarine background. Alberta has two tartans: regular and dress. The regular tartan was adopted in 1961, and its colour scheme represents the green of forests, the gold of wheat fields, the blue of skies and lakes, the pink of wild rose, and the black of coal and petroleum. The dress tartan was adopted in 2000, and its colour scheme represents the Alberta landscape in winter.

=== Natural symbols ===
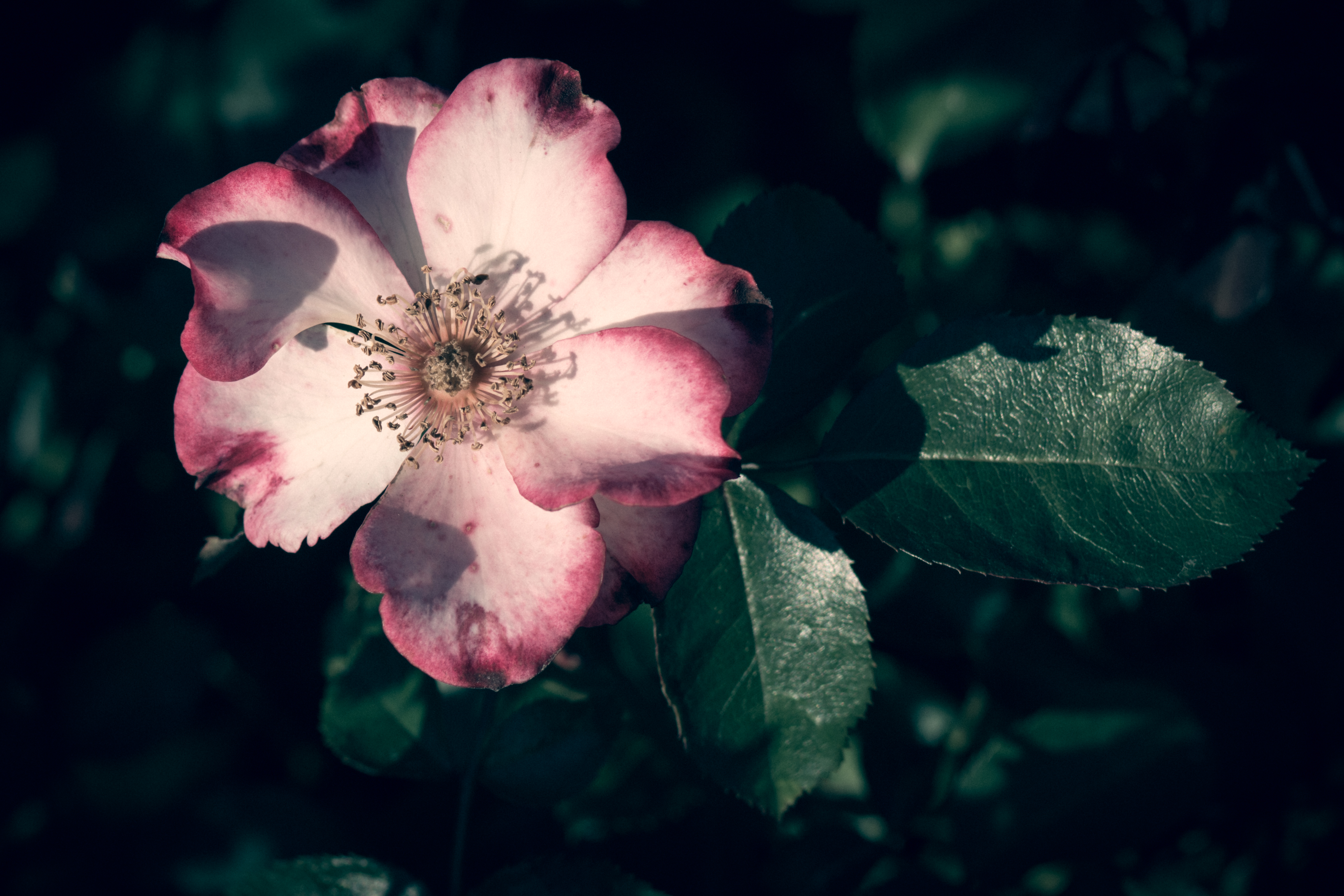
Wild rose

Alberta's best-known natural symbol is the wild rose. The province's licence plates include the phrase "Wild Rose Country", reflecting the flower's symbolic importance. Alberta's provincial tree is the lodgepole pine, its provincial mammal is the bighorn sheep, and its provincial bird is the great horned owl.

=== Monarchy ===
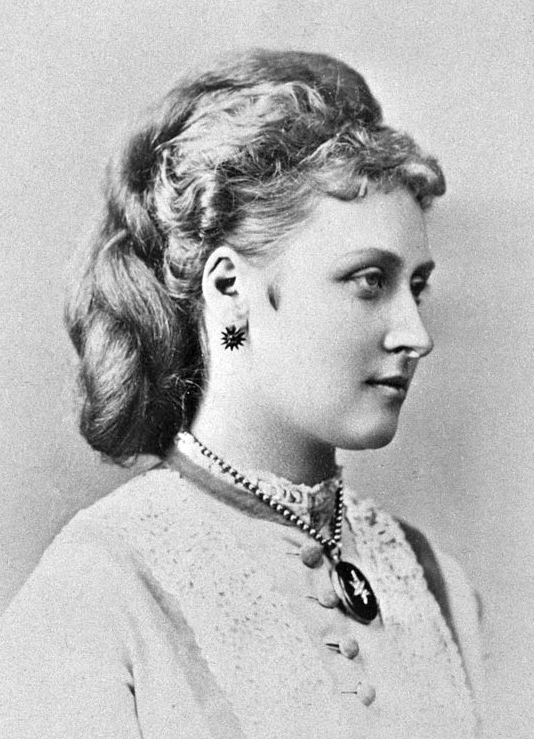
Alberta's namesake, Princess Louise, Duchess of Argyll

Alberta, named after Princess Louise Caroline Alberta (1848–1939), maintains a strong relationship with the Canadian Royal Family. Other royal eponyms include the towns Empress, Lake Louise, Princess, Patricia, and Coronation; the neighbourhoods Prince Rupert, Victoria Park, Connaught, Athlone, King Edward Park, Queen Alexandra, Queen Mary Park, and Prince Charles; the mountains Mount Victoria, Little Alberta, Mount Alberta, Princess Margaret Mountain, and the Queen Elizabeth Ranges; the lakes Lake Louise and Patricia Lake; and the roads Marquis of Lorne Trail, Kingsway, Queen Elizabeth II Highway, and Princess Elizabeth Avenue.

The first reigning monarch to visit Alberta was King George VI, who during his 1939 tour of Canada stayed in Calgary on 26 May and in Banff on 27 May. The Lieutenant Governor of Alberta lives in the province's capital, Edmonton, and the position is held by Salma Lakhani. Government House was built in 1913 to house the LG; however, it has not been used for that purpose since 1938. The Lieutenant Governor does, however, still use it to host her annual Christmas tea and New Year's levée, both of which the public may attend. Canada's current Sovereign, Charles, Prince of Wales first visited Alberta in July 1977 to mark the centenary of Treaty 7. Charles visited again in 1983 with his wife Diana, Princess of Wales. Canada's former Sovereign, Queen Elizabeth II, has visited Alberta six times: in 1951 (as princess), 1959, 1973, 1978, 1990, and 2005. Her most recent visit was to celebrate the centennials of Alberta and Saskatchewan. Many other members of Canada's Royal Family have spent time in Alberta. From 1919 to 1962 Edward, Prince of Wales (later King Edward VIII) owned a property south of Calgary, the E.P. Ranch, beside the Bar U Ranch. Heir to the Canadian throne, Prince William, Duke of Cambridge, visited Alberta for the first time in July 2011.

== Museums and galleries ==
=== Museums ===
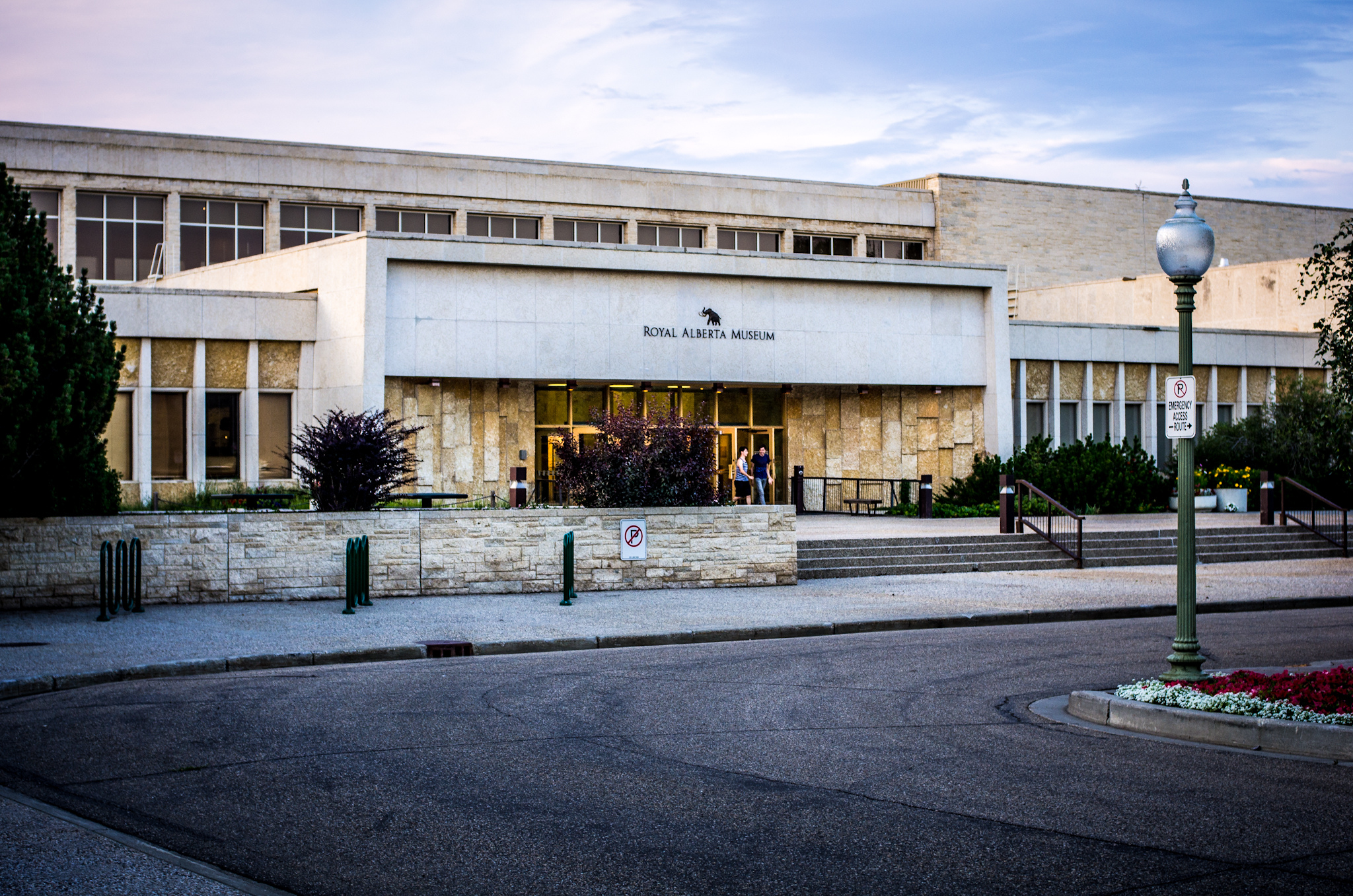
Royal Alberta Museum

Alberta's state museum is the Royal Alberta Museum, located in Edmonton. Opened in 1967 as the Provincial Museum of Alberta, the museum contains life science, earth science, and human history collections. During her 2005 visit to the province, Queen Elizabeth II granted the museum royal patronage, at which time it became the Royal Alberta Museum. In October 2018 the museum moved from its original location in Glenora to a new building downtown. Calgary's largest museum is the Glenbow Museum, which was founded in 1966 by oilman and collector Eric Harvie. The Glenbow boasts a diverse collection of local and international objects. One of the province's unique attractions is the Royal Tyrrell Museum of Palaeontology, located in Drumheller. In Wetaskiwin is the Reynolds-Alberta Museum, which owns one of the world's largest collection of moving machines. The Whyte Museum in Banff opened in 1968 and focuses largely on art and artefacts related to the Rocky Mountains. Aviation museums include the Bomber Command Museum of Canada in Nanton, Hangar Flight Museum in Calgary, the Cold Lake Air Force Museum, and the Alberta Aviation Museum in Edmonton. Sports museums include Canada's Sports Hall of Fame in Calgary and the Alberta Sports Hall of Fame in Red Deer.

=== Galleries ===
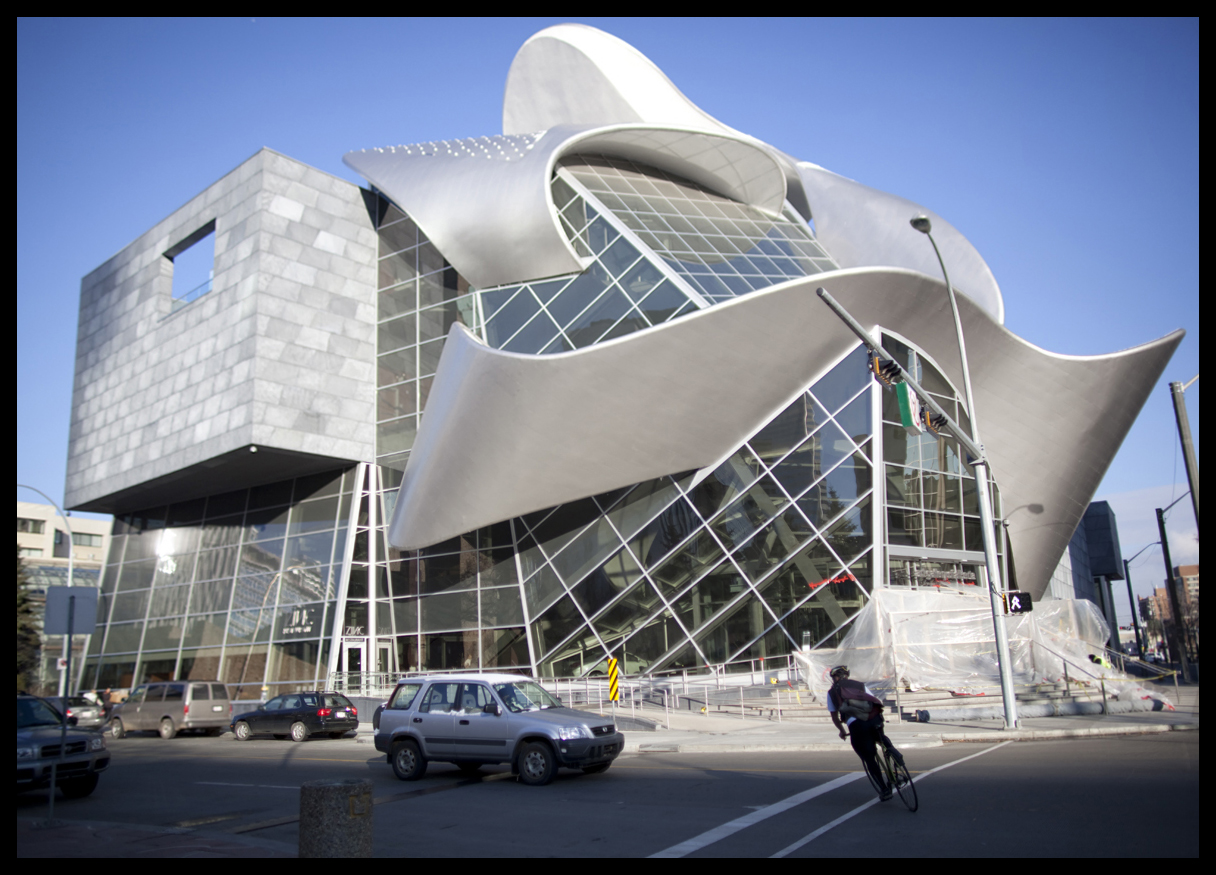
Art Gallery of Alberta

The province's largest gallery is the Art Gallery of Alberta in Edmonton. The museum's origins date to 1924 when the Edmonton Museum of Arts was founded, which in 1956 became the Edmonton Art Museum. In 2005 the gallery moved from its home at the Arthur Blow Condell Memorial Building to a new building designed by Randall Stout, and at this time changed its name to the Art Gallery of Alberta. The Southern Alberta Art Gallery in Lethbridge, which opened in 1976, is a leader in contemporary art. Smaller galleries include the Nickle Galleries at the University of Calgary, and the Marion Nicoll Gallery at the Alberta College of Art and Design.

== Festivals ==
Alberta's two largest festivals are the annual exhibitions held in Calgary and Edmonton: the Calgary Stampede and Klondike Days. Both of these events attract thousands of tourists from around the world. Film festivals include the Edmonton International Film Festival, Calgary International Film Festival, Lethbridge International Film Festival, as well as the Banff Mountain Film Festival. Music festivals include the Calgary Folk Music Festival, Edmonton Folk Music Festival, Canmore Folk Music Festival, Calgary International Blues Festival, Edmonton Blues Festival, Edmonton International Jazz Festival, Medicine Hat Jazz Fest, Calgary International Reggae Festival, and Sled Island. Theatre festivals include Shakespeare in the Park, Edmonton International Fringe Festival, Calgary Fringe Festival, and The Canadian Badlands Passion Play.

== See also ==
- List of writers from Alberta
