= Alberta Registered Music Teachers' Association =

Canadian organization

Alberta Registered Music Teachers’ Association
- Abbreviation: ARMTA
- Formation: 1947
- Type: Non-profit professional association
- Purpose: Promote high standards of music teaching in Alberta
- Headquarters: Alberta, Canada
- Region served: Alberta
- Website: www.armta.ca

The Alberta Registered Music Teachers' Association (ARMTA) is a professional organization representing music teachers across Alberta, Canada. The organization was established to promote high standards of music teaching and to provide a framework for qualified instructors to maintain professional status and exchange teaching methods.

== Background ==
Membership is open to teachers who meet specific educational and experience requirements, including holding a recognized music degree or diploma and having a minimum of two years of teaching experience. Members may use the professional designation R.M.T. (Registered Music Teacher). By the mid-20th century, local branches were active in several Alberta cities, including Calgary and Edmonton. The association has sponsored recitals, scholarships, and conventions, and participated in regional collaborations such as the Western Board of Music.

During the COVID-19 pandemic, the Lethbridge branch of ARMTA held virtual performances and celebrated Canadian Music Week with online concerts.

== Notable members ==
Jessie Kennedy served as registrar, secretary, and treasurer for the organization between 1941 and 1974, and was recognized as a life member upon her retirement. Composer Violet Archer received an honorary life membership from ARMTA in 1980 in recognition of her contributions to Canadian music. The 1986 annual conference of the Alberta Registered Music Teachers’ Association featured American vocal educator Joan Frey Boytim as its keynote speaker.

== See also ==
- Culture of Alberta
- Music of Canada
