= Stadelbauer =

Stadelbauer is a German language occupational surname for a "farmer" and may refer to:

- Helen Stadelbauer (1910–2006), Canadian painter and educator
- Lisa Stadelbauer, Canadian ambassador to Israel
