= Leighton Art Centre =

Art museum in Alberta, Canada

- Location of in Alberta
- Former name: Leighton Centre for Arts and Crafts
- Established: 1974
- Location: Millarville, Alberta
- Coordinates: 50.7964°N 114.2119°W
- Type: Art gallery Art museum Art education centre
- Accreditation: Alberta Register of Historic Places (7 May 2009)
- Key holdings: A. C. Leighton's artwork and archives
- Founder: Barbara Mary Leighton
- Director: Christina Cuthbertson
- Chairperson: Michele Chiasson-Suart
- Architect: A.C. Leighton
- Owner: Leighton Foundation
- Website: www.leightoncentre.org

Leighton Art Centre (LAC) is a non-profit public art gallery, museum and education centre near the hamlet of Millarville, Alberta, south of Calgary that was established in 1974. The gallery and museum building were designed as his family's residence by Alfred Crocker Leighton, who was a member of the Royal Society of British Artists (RBA). His widow, Barbara Leighton, first established the gallery to showcase A. C. Leighton's artwork. In 1974, she incorporated the Leighton Foundation to operate the gallery and museum to exhibit his work along with other Albertan artists. The centre was designated as a Provincial Historic Resource on 7 May 2009.

== Overview ==
The gallery and museum are located on property that had been purchased by Alfred Crocker Leighton, who was a member of the Royal Society of British Artists (RBA) and had established the Alberta Society of Artists. Leighton was born in 1901 in Hastings, Sussex and served as Art Director of the Art Institute of Calgary starting in 1929. He married one of his art students Barbara Harvey. They purchased the property near Millarville in 1952. Following Leighton's death in 1965, Barbara Leighton completed her diploma course at the Provincial Institute of Design and Technology in 1969. In 1970, she began to use part of her home to display her husband's artwork. By 2020 the property associated with the centre, spanned 80 acres of "Foothills fescue natural grasslands" overlooking the Rocky Mountains to the west.

== Leighton home ==
In 1952, Alfred Crocker Leighton (27 October 1901 – 6 May 1965), a member of the Royal Society of British Artists (RBA), and his wife Barbara Mary Leighton (née Harvey) (1909–1986) purchased the property for their family residence. A. C. Leighton designed the house in a predominantly "English Country" style "in a cruciform shape with a central tower to view the magnificent landscape from any direction."

The Leighton's named their home ''Ballyhamage'' after a one-room schoolhouse constructed in 1919, and later abandoned, that was on their property. Barbara Leighton purchased the original Ballyhamage schoolhouse, which had been abandoned. She converted it first into an art studio and later into its present use as a children's education centre. Over the years, the centre expanded in membership and size, and Barbara added two other buildings to accommodate classes in batik, copper enamelling, weaving, tie-dyeing, pottery, wood-working, print-making, jewellery-making, and silver-smithing.

== Leighton Foundation ==
In 1974, Barbara Leighton turned her home into a gallery to showcase the work of A. C. Leighton as well as works by other Alberta artists such as Stan Perrott, Barbara Ballachey, Jim Nicoll, Marion Nicholl, Rick Grandmaison, Janet Mitchell, Roland Gissing, Illingworth Kerr, and sculptor Richard Roenisch. Over 150 archived items from The Leighton Art Centre and museum are featured in the Virtual Museum of Canada, which is administered by the Canadian Museum of History.

== Activities ==
By 2020, the centre had 300 members and held year round educational programs as well as exhibitions of the work of contemporary artists.

== See also ==
- List of museums in Alberta
- Alfred Crocker Leighton
