= Alfred Crocker Leighton =

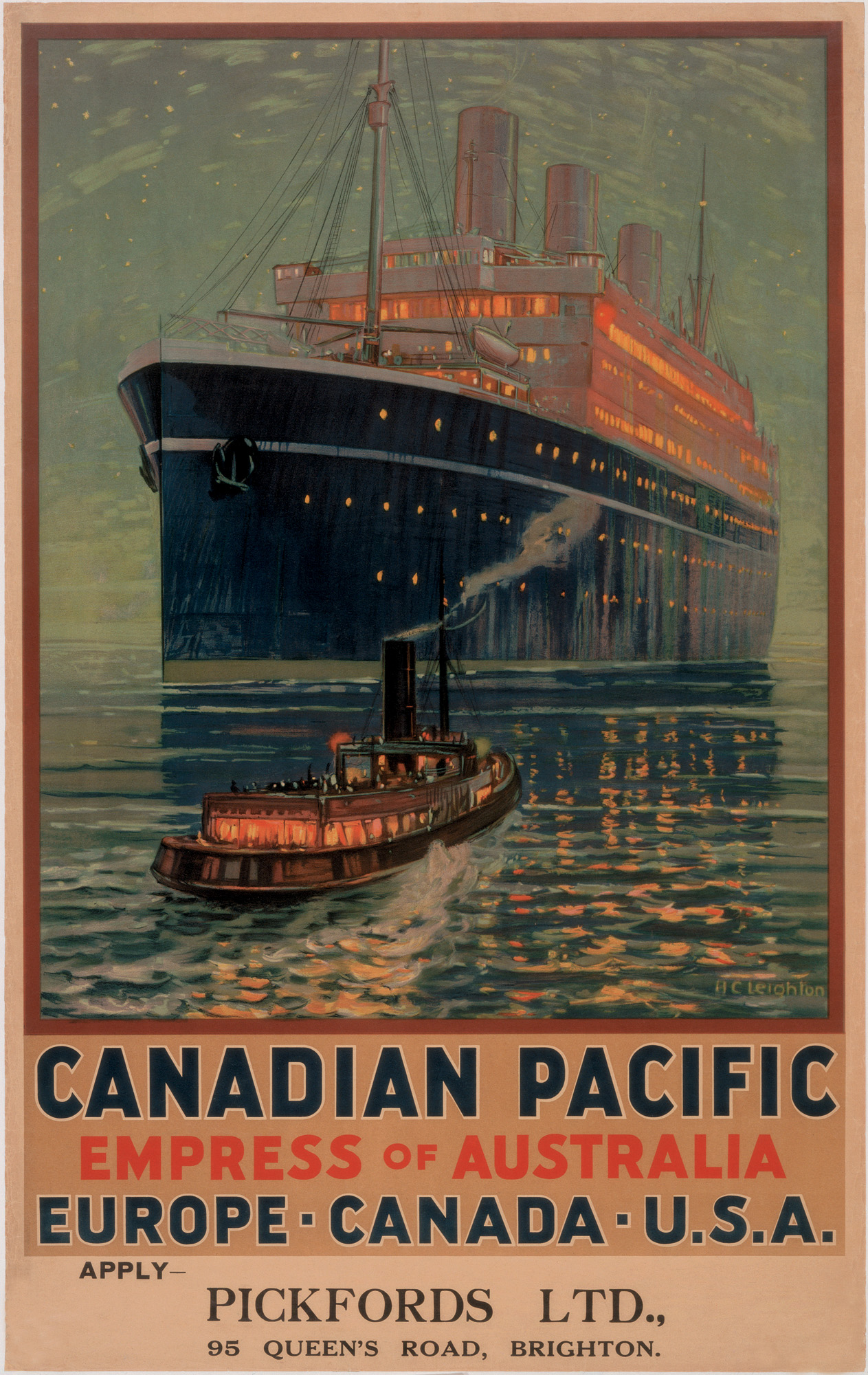
Poster designed by A.C. Leighton

Alfred Crocker Leighton (October 27, 1900 or 1901 – May 1965), commonly known as A. C. Leighton, was a British-Canadian landscape painter, architect, and educator. He is frequently described as a foundational figure in the history of art in Alberta, Canada. Leighton was the first president of the Alberta Society of Artists and established the program that became the visual arts department of the Banff Centre for Arts and Creativity.

== Early life and education ==
Alfred Crocker Leighton was born in Hastings, Sussex, England, to Charles and Frances Leighton. While his birth certificate records the year as 1900, his tombstone and several biographical sources cite 1901. Leighton demonstrated an early talent for drawing and, despite his father's preference that he study architecture, he received a scholarship to attend the Hastings School of Art at the Brassey Institute. There, he studied under the tutelage of E. Leslie Badham.

In 1917 or 1918, Leighton enlisted in the Royal Flying Corps (later the Royal Air Force) while underage. During a training flight, his aircraft crashed after striking power lines, resulting in injuries that caused him chronic health problems throughout his life. He was discharged in April 1919 and subsequently worked as a toy designer for the engineering firm Vickers and as a freelance artist in London.

== Career in England ==
During his early career in England, Leighton focused on painting architectural subjects and natural landscapes. He became particularly concerned with the preservation of historic windmills, which were being replaced by modern industrial mills. He founded the Society for the Preservation of Windmills and produced numerous watercolours and pastels of these structures to create a visual record for the British government. One of these works, Hog Hill Mill, was exhibited at the 1929 Paris Salon.

In 1926, Leighton was elected the youngest associate member of the Royal Society of British Artists (RBA) at the age of 26. By 1929, he had been elected as a full member of the society.

== Move to Canada ==
Leighton's connection to Canada began in 1924 after he and a partner constructed a highly acclaimed scale model of the port of Liverpool. The model impressed officials from the Canadian Pacific Railway (CPR), who hired Leighton to produce commercial art and promotional paintings of the Canadian landscape.

During his initial six-month tour in 1924, Leighton was immediately captivated by the Rocky Mountains. To find ideal vantage points, he reportedly jumped from moving trains and scaled cliffs, establishing a reputation for daring methods in his pursuit of plein air subjects. While the CPR retained first right of purchase for his work, many of the original paintings held in the railway's London offices were destroyed by bombing during World War II.

Leighton returned to Canada for exhibitions in 1927 and 1929, showing work at the Banff Springs Hotel, the Calgary Public Library, and through the Eaton's department store chain across Western Canada.

== Educational leadership and organizations ==
In late 1929, Leighton accepted the position of Art Director at the Art Institute of Calgary (part of the Provincial Institute of Technology and Art, now the Alberta University of the Arts and SAIT). He is credited with expanding the department's reputation and maintaining enrollment during the Great Depression. Leighton was a central figure in organizing the Alberta arts community:

- Alberta Society of Artists (ASA): Leighton co-founded the society in 1931 with Reginald Llewellyn Harvey and served as its first president until 1942.
- Banff School of Fine Arts: In 1933, he established a summer art school in the Kananaskis area for his students. This program was moved to Banff in 1935, forming the basis of the visual arts program at what is now the Banff Centre for Arts and Creativity.
- Calgary Sketch Club: He formed this club in 1931, which later merged with the Calgary Art Club.

Leighton's health began to decline significantly in 1936 due to overwork, leading him to take a leave of absence to recuperate in England. He officially resigned from his teaching positions in 1938.

== Artistic style and subjects ==
Leighton's work was rooted in British academic traditions and heavily influenced by the English sensibility toward alpine scenery, such as that of J. M. W. Turner. He was a proponent of plein air painting, often trekking into remote backcountry locations to capture "austere" and "solitary" mountain scenes untouched by development. While he worked in both oil and watercolour, he is particularly noted for his mastery of watercolours. His primary subjects included glaciers, peaks, and high passes of the Rockies, as well as English village scenes and windmills.

In addition to his painting, Leighton was a designer and architect.He designed and built at least three homes that were nearly identical in layout: one in Crescent Beach, British Columbia, and two in the Calgary and Millarville areas. His architectural style was influenced by the Arts and Crafts movement and included elements from his study of windmills, such as spiral staircases.

== Personal life and Legacy ==
In 1930, Leighton met Barbara Mary Harvey (1909–1986), a student in his art classes. They married in May 1931 and spent their honeymoon on a painting expedition in the Kananaskis. Barbara became an artist in her own right, known for her "Barleigh" prints based on A. C.'s paintings.

The couple moved to Chilliwack and Crescent Beach in British Columbia in 1941, but they returned to Alberta after several years because Leighton missed the prairie skies and mountain scenery. In 1952, they purchased 80 acres in the Millarville area, naming the property "Ballyhamage." The house they built there, completed around 1960, served as his final studio.

Leighton's health continued to fail, and he died at the Calgary General Hospital in May 1965. He is buried in Millarville, Alberta.

In 1974, Barbara Leighton established the Leighton Art Centre at their former home in Millarville to serve as a gallery, museum, and educational facility. The centre houses a significant collection of his work and continues to offer art and nature programs. Leighton's paintings are also held in the permanent collections of the National Gallery of Canada and the Vancouver Art Gallery.

== See also ==
- List of Canadian artists
- Leighton Art Centre
- Banff Centre for Arts and Creativity
- History of Alberta
