= Joan Frey Boytim =

- Born: May 6, 1933; Carlisle, Pennsylvania, U.S.
- Died: December 16, 2024 (aged 91); Carlisle, Pennsylvania, U.S.
- Education: Indiana University of Pennsylvania; Indiana University Bloomington
- Occupations: Vocal pedagogue, editor, author
- Notable work: The Private Voice Studio Handbook
- Awards: NATS Lifetime Achievement Award (2016)

Joan Frey Boytim (May 6, 1933 – December 16, 2024) was an American vocal pedagogue, editor, and author. She was best known for compiling a series of vocal anthologies published by Hal Leonard and G. Schirmer Inc., and for writing The Private Voice Studio Handbook: A Practical Guide to All Aspects of Teaching.

== Background ==
Boytim was born in Carlisle, Pennsylvania, and earned a Bachelor of Science degree in music education from Indiana University of Pennsylvania in 1955 and a Master of Music Education from Indiana University Bloomington in 1964. She taught in the Carlisle Area School District, maintained a private studio for more than fifty years, and served as an adjunct professor at Messiah College. Her publications, including The First Book of Soprano Solos and related volumes, have been widely used in voice instruction.

== Recognition ==
The 1986 annual conference of the Alberta Registered Music Teachers’ Association featured American vocal educator Joan Frey Boytim as its keynote speaker. In 2016 the National Association of Teachers of Singing presented Boytim with its Lifetime Achievement Award. The organization also sponsors the Joan Frey Boytim Awards for Independent Teachers, established in her honor. Boytim died in Carlisle at the age of 91.
