= Millarville =

- Hamlet
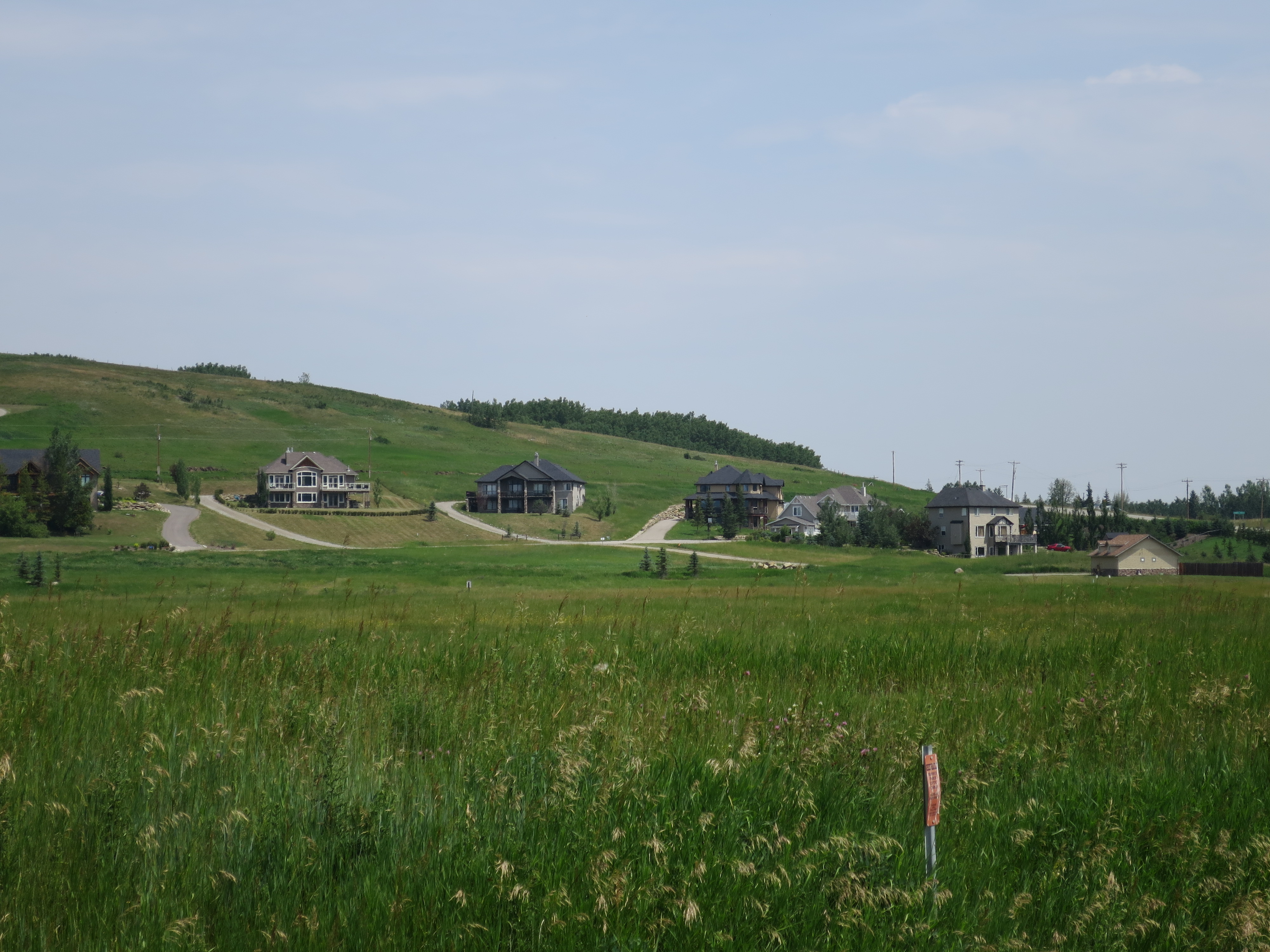
- The eastern part of the hamlet of Millarville, looking ENE from Highway 549. Highways 22 is visible near the right edge of the image.

- Location of Millarville in Alberta
- Coordinates: 50.7567°N 114.3194°W
- Country: Canada
- Province: Alberta
- Census division: No. 6
- Municipal district: Foothills County

Government
  - Type: Unincorporated
  - Reeve: Rob Siewert
  - Governing body: M.D. of Foothills Council: Suzanne Oel; Benita Estes; Laura Kendall; Alan Alger; John Callister; RD McHugh; Rob Siewert
- Elevation: 1,185 m (3,888 ft)

Population (2003)
  - Total: 58
- Time zone: UTC−06:00 (Alberta Time)

Millarville is a hamlet in Alberta, Canada within the Foothills County. It is located in the foothills of the Canadian Rockies at an elevation of 1,185 metres (3,888 ft). The hamlet is located northwest of the intersection of the Cowboy Trail (Highway 22) and Highway 549, approximately 11 kilometres (6.8 mi) north of Turner Valley and 35 kilometres (22 mi) southwest of Calgary's city limits.

The hamlet is within Census Division No. 6 and in the federal riding of Macleod.

== History ==
The post office first opened in April 1892.

== Demographics ==
The population of Millarville according to the most recent 2003 municipal census conducted by Foothills County is 58.

== Attractions ==
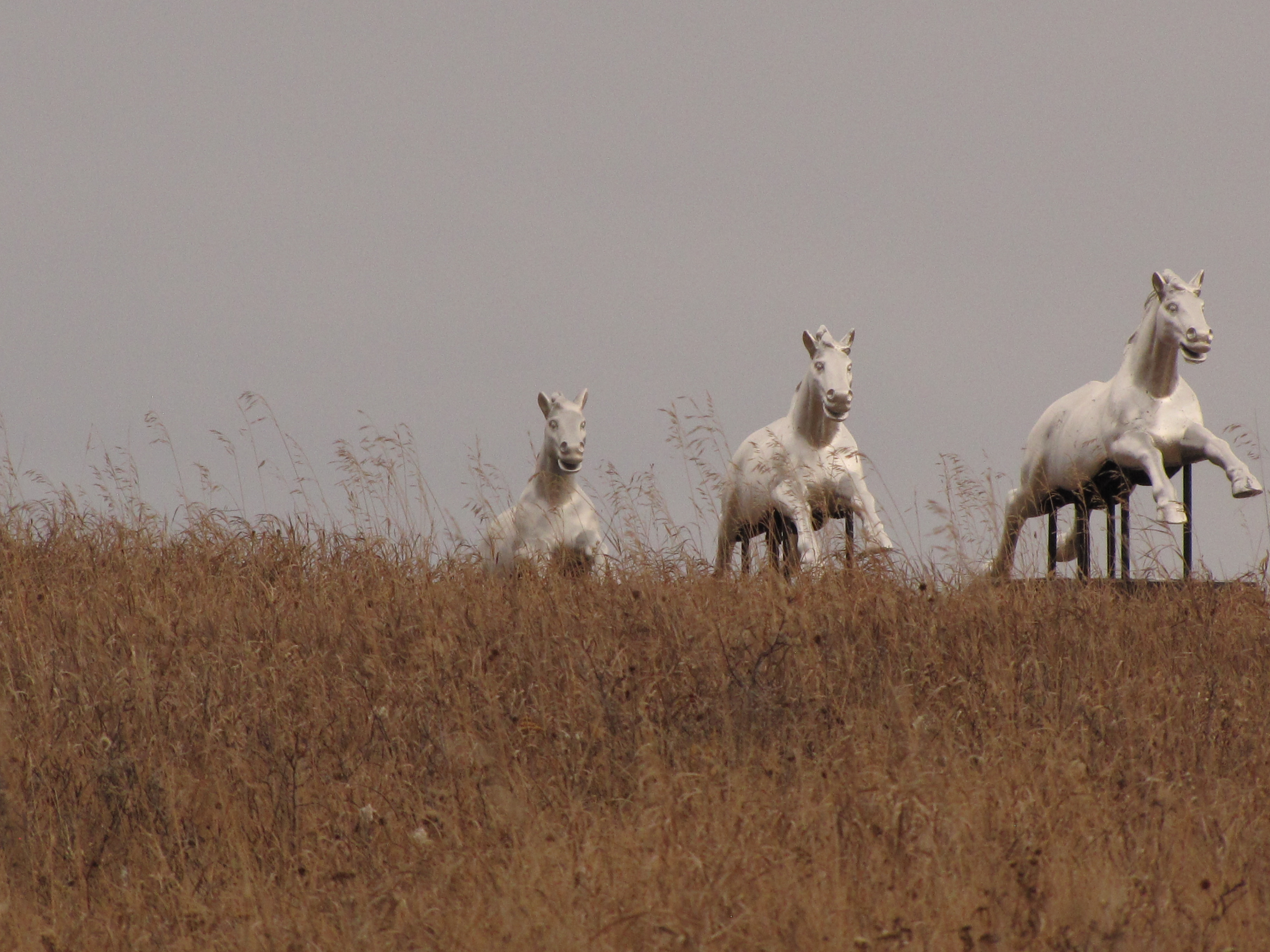
Helios is a former exhibit at the Leighton Art Centre

Millarville is the location of the Millarville Market and Fair. Founded in 1907, the market and fair are hosted by the Millarville Racing and Agricultural Society on land northeast of the hamlet, 1.6 kilometres east down Highway 549, east. (MRAS).

The Leighton Art Centre includes a gallery of Alberta art and the museum home of founders and artists A.C. and Barbara Leighton. There is also a gallery shop of art and handcrafts.

== Education ==
Millarville Community School is located in the hamlet. The school includes a kindergarten program through to grade eight.

== See also ==
- List of communities in Alberta
- List of hamlets in Alberta
