= Roland Gissing =

Canadian artist (1895-1967)

- Born: May 14, 1895; Willersey in the county of Gloucestershire, South West England
- Died: September 29, 1967 (aged 72); Okotoks near Calgary
- Education: George Watson's College, Edinburgh, Scotland; as an artist, mainly self-taught
- Known for: Painter of Western Canada
- Spouse(s): Alexina (Enie) Gillies (1884-1967) (1931, divorced 1961); Ester Lily Skogheim (1909-1988)

Roland Gissing (May 14, 1895 – September 29, 1967) was a painter whose subject was the western Canadian landscape. His paintings are today in The Royal Collection, and other public collections.

== Career ==
Gissing was born in Willersey in the county of Gloucestershire, South West England. He studied at George Watson's College in Edinburgh, Scotland. Inspired by cowboy movies, he moved to western Canada in 1913, and for ten years he worked as a ranch hand in southern Alberta and the southwestern U.S.A. He returned to Calgary and in 1924, settled near Cochrane, Alberta. There, a chance meeting with C. W. Jefferys, who was visiting the Mortimer Ranch in Alberta which was near Gissing's home, encouraged him as an artist. He received some instruction from A. C. Leighton but was mainly self-taught.

In 1929 Gissing had his first solo show in Calgary, then opened his own gallery. Even with the arrival of The Depression in Canada Gissing stayed in Calgary but in 1931 he returned to Cochrane where he married and continued to paint. From 1931 to 1934 he exhibited with the Art Association of Montreal. In 1934 and 1935 he showed his work at the Royal Canadian Academy of Arts. In 1944 Gissing had a destructive fire which razed his home and studio but he recovered, rebuilt and painted again.

== Work ==
His painting was influenced by the work of western artists such as Charles Marion Russell and the Group of Seven but by 1930 he was developing the subject his own way - a lucid western landscape seen by sunlight, painted from oil sketches done on lengthy trips using a packhorse or car to carry supplies. They were usually of mountains, foothills or streams but sometimes recorded the dwellings he found there as in John Ware's Ranch at Duchess, Alberta (Glenbow Museum, 1963). He was elected an associate member of the Alberta Society of Artists when it was first formed in 1930 and a full member in 1947. In addition, he was a member of the Calgary Sketch Club. His paintings are in the Royal Collection, the Glenbow Museum, the Alberta Foundation for the Arts, and the Whyte Museum of the Canadian Rockies, among others. A Roland Gissing fonds is in the Glenbow Museum.
