= Helen Stadelbauer =

Canadian painter

- Born: December 20, 1910; Calgary, Alberta, Canada
- Died: April 6, 2006 (aged 95); Calgary, Alberta, Canada
- Known for: Painter, Educator

Helen Stadelbauer (December 20, 1910 – April 6, 2006) was a Canadian painter and educator known for her establishment of the Art Department at the University of Calgary.

== Biography ==
Helen Barbara Stadelbauer was born in Calgary, Alberta, on December 20, 1910. She grew up in Calgary and attended Crescent Heights Collegiate High School, now known as Crescent Heights High School. She later attended Calgary Normal School with her sister Isabel and graduated in 1933. Both sisters later went on to be artists and art educators, and their love of drawing and painting was fostered through early family holidays in the Rockies.

== Education ==
Concurrent to teaching, Stadelbauer pursued an arts education in the evenings and summers. Beginning in 1936 she attended the Provincial Institute of Technology and Art, the Banff School of Fine Arts and the Summer School of the Department of Education. At her summer courses at Banff she studied with A.Y. Jackson, Walter J. Phillips, and Charles Comfort. She received an Advanced Diploma in Fine Arts from the Alberta College of Art.

In 1947, after becoming a lecturer at the University of Alberta, Stadelbauer took a leave of absence to attend Columbia University in New York. There she received her bachelor's and master's degrees. She later achieved a full diploma from the Royal Drawing Society in London.

== Career ==
=== Educator ===
Helen Stadelbauer began her career teaching at a rural school near Calgary. After teaching there for four years she transferred to a small two-room school in Calgary, where she taught four more years.

In 1949, Stadelbauer returned to Calgary after studying at Columbia University. She helped to establish the University of Calgary as an independent entity from the University of Alberta. She was a founding member the University of Calgary's art department. Starting as the sole faculty member, Stadelbauer worked to expand the department, both teaching and working in an administrative capacity, as well as launching BA program in Art, Drama, and Music.

Stadelbauer stayed at the University of Calgary for 31 years, retiring in 1989. In 1997, she donated her papers and artwork to the library at the University of Calgary. She died in Calgary on April 6, 2006.

=== Artist ===
Helen Stadelbauer painted in oil, watercolour, and acrylics. Little was known about her career until the 2000s, as often it was overshadowed by her career as a dedicated educator. She received formal instruction through six summer sessions at the Banff Centre, and painted landscape paintings, as well as abstract geometric works on paper. Much of her work was interested in exploring urban industrial landscapes through modernist styles including op-art and geometric abstraction, and incorporated influences from artists such as the Group of Seven and Bridget Riley. Her work, Breaking the Atom (1946), is the earliest surviving piece of abstract art in Alberta.

Stadelbauer's artworks are included in the collections of the Alberta Foundation for the Arts, the Nickle Galleries, and the Glenbow Museum.

== Select exhibitions ==
- At the Crossroads: Helen Stadelbauer and Wes Irwin, Triangle Gallery of Visual Art, Calgary, AB, 2010
- Alberta Mistresses of the Modern: 1935-1975, Art Gallery of Alberta, Edmonton, AB, 2012
