= Jerry Bremner =

Canadian professional chuckwagon racer

- Jerry Bremner on stage in 1993 after winning the Calgary Stampede Rangeland Derby
- Born: January 27, 1960
- Achievements: 1990 World Champion Driver 1995 World Champion Driver; 2003 World Champion Driver; 1996 World Champion Outrider Calgary Stampede Rangeland Derby Champion (1993) Ponoka Stampede Champion (1996, 2007)
- Statistics up to date as of April 5, 2015.

Jerry Bremner (born January 27, 1960) is a Canadian professional chuckwagon racer. He is a three-time World Champion Chuckwagon Driver and was the 1986 World Champion Outrider.

== Career ==
Bremner grew up in Rapid View, Saskatchewan. He started his chuckwagon racing career as an outrider when he was 12 in 1972 with the Northern Chuckwagon Racing Association, and began driving when he was 24 in 1984 on the World Professional Chuckwagon Association (WPCA) circuit. Jerry became the second rookie to win a show on the WPCA Pro Tour (after Rick Fraser when he captured the Trochu Chuckwagon Championship in 1984 and was named the WPCA Top Rookie Driver in 1984 as well. He won his first Calgary Stampede trophy in 1982 as an outrider for Dave Lewis, another in 1984 outriding for Dallas Dorchester, and in 1986 he was the World Champion Outrider.

After starting his driving career in 1984, by 1989 he had some three small shows at the Trochu Chuckwagon Championship in 1984 and 1989, and the chuckwagon championship in Rimbey in 1986. None of these wins had points that counted towards the World Championship. In 1990, Jerry captured the Trochu Chuckwagon Championship for the third time, and although it was a no-points show, Jerry was the top point earner on the World Professional Chuckwagon Association (WPCA) circuit by years end and was named the 1990 World Champion Chuckwagon Driver. In 1993, he won the second major title of his career when he captured the Calgary Stampede Rangeland Derby Championship.

Over the next 15 years, Bremner was a regular winner on the WPCA Pro Tour. He captured two more World Chuckwagon Championships in 1995 and 2003, and twice won the Ponoka Stampede Championship in 1996 and 2007. He also captured the Grande Prairie Stompede on three occasions, and the North American Chuckwagon Championship and Medicine Hat Exhibition & Stampede championships twice each among others. Jerry also had 4 horses named to the WPCA Equine Outfit of Excellence. Jerry retired at the end of the 2015 Calgary Stampede.

On July 8, 2024, Jerry was named to the Calgary Stampede's Class of 2024 Pioneers of Rodeo.

== Personal life ==
Jerry was born in Loon Lake, Saskatchewan, to a former Calgary Stampede finalist, Roy Bremner. Jerry has two children - Shane and Jaycee. Along with his wife Donna, the Bremners make their home in Westerose, Alberta.

== Professional wins ==
- 1986 World Champion Outrider
- 1990 World Champion Chuckwagon Driver
- 1995 World Champion Chuckwagon Driver
- 2003 World Champion Chuckwagon Driver

=== Show Wins - Driver (18) ===
- 1984 (1) Trochu Chuckwagon Championship
- 1986 (1) Rimby Chuckwagon Championship
- 1989 (1) Trochu Chuckwagon Championship
- 1990 (1) Trochu Chuckwagon Championship
- 1993 (2) Trochu Chuckwagon Championship, Calgary Stampede Rangeland Derby Champion Driver
- 1994 (2) Grande Prairie Stompede, Moses Lake Roundup
- 1996 (2) Trochu Chuckwagon Championship, Ponoka Stampede Championship
- 2006 (3) Medicine Hat Exhibition & Stampede, North American Chuckwagon Championship, WPCA Dodge Pro Tour Championship
- 2007 (3) Grande Prairie Stompede, Ponoka Stampede Championship, Medicine Hat Exhibition & Stampede
- 2008 (1) Grande Prairie Stompede, WPCA Equine Outfit of Excellence - "STORM" - Champion Outriding Horse
- 2009 (1) North American Chuckwagon Championship

=== Major Wins - Outrider (4) ===
This list is probably incomplete

- 1982 (2) Calgary Stampede Rangeland Derby Champion Outrider, Calgary Stampede Aggregate Champion Outrider
- 1984 (1) Calgary Stampede Rangeland Derby Champion Outrider
- 1991 (2) Calgary Stampede Rangeland Derby Champion Outrider

== Awards ==
- WPCA Top Rookie Driver (1984)
- WPCA Most Improved Chuckwagon Driver (1986)
- WPCA Clean Drive Award (2003)
- Guy Weadick Award (2005)
- WPCA Equine Award Of Excellence - "SLASH" - Champion Outriding Horse (2006)
- WPCA Equine Award Of Excellence - "MONARCH" - Champion Left Wheeler (2007)
- WPCA Equine Outfit of Excellence - "STORM" - Champion Outriding Horse (2008)
- WPCA Equine Outfit of Excellence - "WHISPER" - Champion Right Leader (2011)

== Personal life ==
Jerry is a second generation chuckwagon driver whose father was former Calgary Stampede finalist Roy Bremner. Jerry has two children - Shane and Jaycee. Along with his wife Donna, the Bremners make their home in Westerose, Alberta.
