= Troy Dorchester =

Canadian professional chuckwagon racer

- Troy Dorchester with his outriders winning the 2012 Calgary Stampede Aggregate Title
- Born: December 6, 1972
- Achievements: Calgary Stampede Rangeland Derby (2012) Calgary Stampede Aggregate Title (2012) Ponoka Stampede Champion (2012)
- Statistics up to date as of April 5, 2015.

Troy Dorchester (born December 6, 1972) is a Canadian professional chuckwagon racer. He is the only chuckwagon driver to have won chuckwagon racing's "Triple Crown" consisting of the Calgary Stampede Rangeland Derby, the Calgary Stampede Aggregate Title and the Ponoka Stampede in a single year. He accomplished the feat in 2012.

== Career ==
Dorchester grew up in Westerose, Alberta. He started his chuckwagon racing career driving pony chuckwagons, and began driving thoroughbred wagons in 1993 on the World Professional Chuckwagon Association (WPCA) circuit and won WPCA Top Rookie Driver honors. He qualified for his first Calgary Stampede Rangeland Derby as a driver in 1998 and won the Orville Strandquist Award for top rookie driver.

His first show championship win came in 1999 at the Grande Prairie Stampede. Later that same year he added the Strathmore Heritage Days Championship, and captured the WPCA Pro Tour Championship (a showcase event held at Strathmore in conjunction with the Strathmore Heritage Days) as well. Although he had been close (he qualified for a number of single run championship final heats) and was runner-up for the World Championship in 2011, Troy did not win another event until 2012 when he captured the Ponoka Stampede. He followed it up two weeks later when he captured the Calgary Stampede Aggregate Championship, and two days later won chuckwagon racing biggest event - the Calgary Stampede Rangeland Derby to become the first man to win chuckwagon racing's "Triple Crown" in a single year.

== Professional wins ==
=== Show Wins - Driver (6) ===
- 1999 (3) Grande Prairie Stompede, Strathmore Heritage Days, WPCA GMC Tour Championship
- 2012 (3) Ponoka Stampede, Calgary Stampede Rangeland Derby Champion Driver, Richard Cosgrave Memorial Award (Calgary Stampede Aggregate Champion)

== Awards ==
- WPCA Top Rookie Driver (1993)
- Orville Strandquist Award (1998)
- WPCA Clean Drive Award (2011, 2014)
- Calgary Stampede Safety Award (Least Penalized Driver) (2012)

== Personal life ==
Troy is a third generation champion chuckwagon driver whose grandfather was hall-of-fame cowboy Tom Dorchester - a 4-time World and 2-time Calgary Stampede champion, his father Garry Dorchester is a former World and Calgary Stampede Champion, and Uncle Dallas Dorchester was a former World and 2-time Calgary Stampede Champion as well. Troy is a first cousin to 2-time World Champion Chuckwagon Driver Rick Fraser, and 2-time World Champion Chuckwagon Outrider Quinn Dorchester. Troy has three children - Emilee, Haley and Connor. He and his wife Jennifer make their home in Westerose, Alberta.
