= Kelly Sutherland (chuckwagon) =

Canadian chuckwagon racer (born 1951)

- Born: October 29, 1951 (age 75); Grande Prairie, Alberta

WPCA career
- Debut season: 1969

Championship titles
- 1974, 1977, 1979, 1982, 1983, 1996, 1998, 1999, 2006, 2007, 2010, 2011: WPCA world championships

Championship titles
- 1974, 1975, 1977, 1978, 1986, 1997, 1998, 1999, 2001, 2002, 2010, 2011: Calgary Stampede

Kelly Sutherland, nicknamed "The King", (born October 29, 1951) is a professional rodeo competitor in chuckwagon racing. He is a 12-time world champion of the World Professional Chuckwagon Association and 12-time winner at the Calgary Stampede.

== Early life ==
Sutherland is from Grande Prairie, Alberta. Chuckwagon racing is a family affair. Sutherland was inspired by his father, who was an amateur racer and other members of the family who competed.

== Career ==
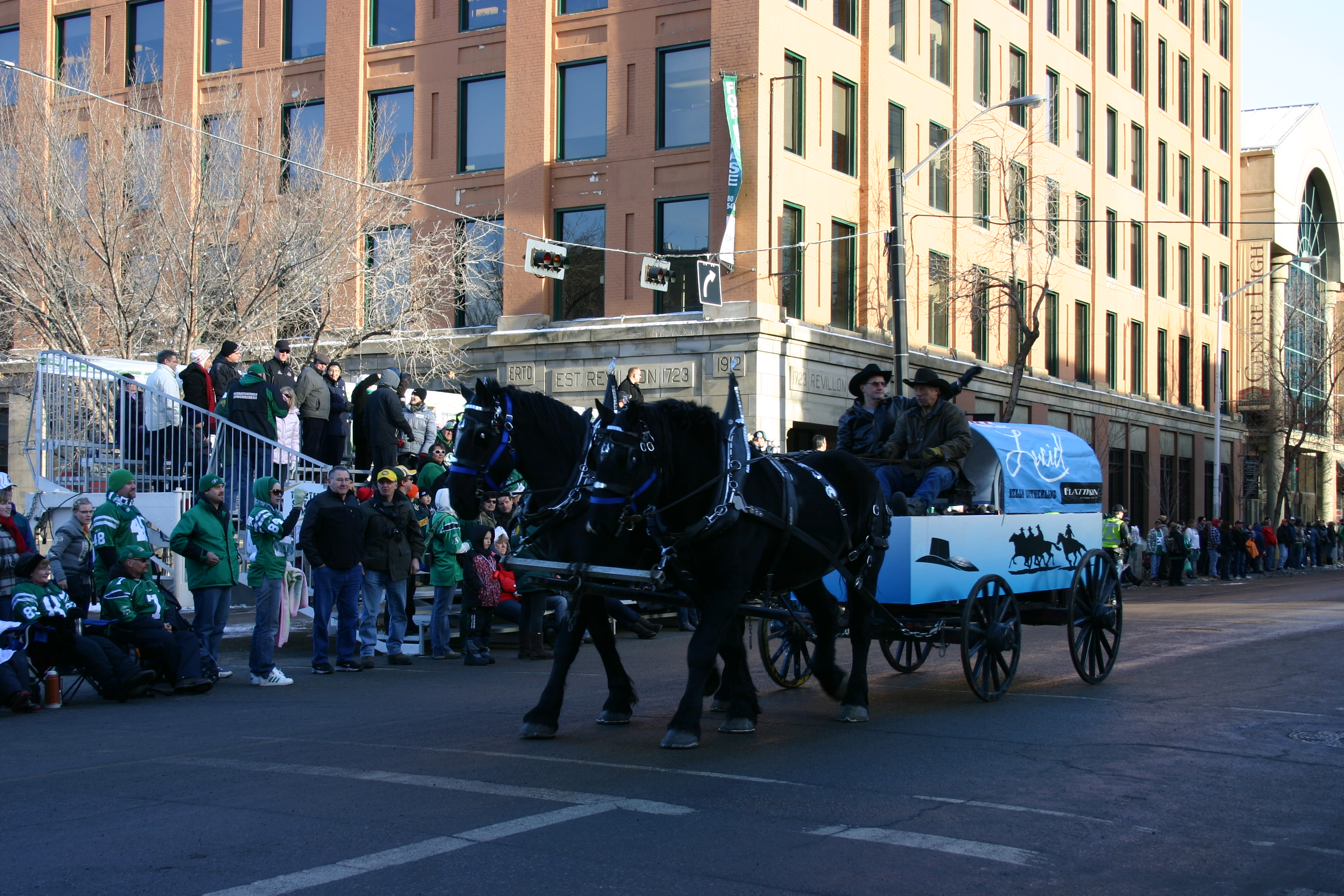
Sutherland at the 2010 Grey Cup parade.

He has been competing in chuckwagon racing since 1967. Sutherland was 14 when he started racing. He was 22 when he won his first race. He can recall being on stage for the first time for an audience of 40,000. "When you're in the sport, you only dream about getting the opportunity to win and I was fortunate when I was young."

He was an outrider for the first year, then began driving in 1968. His rookie season in the WPCA was 1969. He competed in the 2016 Calgary Stampede Rangeland Derby. In 2010, Sutherland won the chuckwagon championship for the 11th time, breaking the world record. He was almost 60 years old when he won his final and 12th world championship. He also has a dozen championships from the Calgary Stampede, nine championships from the Ponoka Stampede, and one from his hometown of Grande Prairie. He won his 12th and final world championship not long before his birthday in 2017. The year 2017 was his last year competing, as the event has a mandatory retirement age of 65. Sutherland competed in his last race in Rocky Mountain House in west central Alberta. Sutherland spent 50 years guiding horses around the track.

== Awards ==
- 2012 Calgary Stampede Guy Weadick Award
- 12 Calgary Stampede Championships
- 12 World Championships
- 7 time Calgary Stampede Aggregate Winner
- 77 Champion final heats on World Professional Chuckwagon Association Circuit
- 25 Victories in Championship heats on the World Professional Chuckwagon Association Circuit
- $300,000 highest bid chuckwagon canvas sold at Calgary Stampede Canvas Auction (2012)

== Personal life ==
Sutherland owned a country bar in Canada in the 1980s, called Kelly's Bar at the Sutherland Inn, in Clairmont, Alberta. His first Chuckwagon hung from the ceiling above the dance floor. Sutherland's wife Debbie has been riding with him ever since he began racing competitively.

In 2009, Sutherland participated in the 2010 Winter Olympics as one of 13 torchbearers for his home town of Grande Prairie, Alberta. Each of the torchbearers rode down the main street of the town for the one-kilometre ride with the torch. He revealed that he will put the used torch on display with his 38 chuckwagon trophies.
