= Curtis Glencross =

Canadian ice hockey player (born 1982)

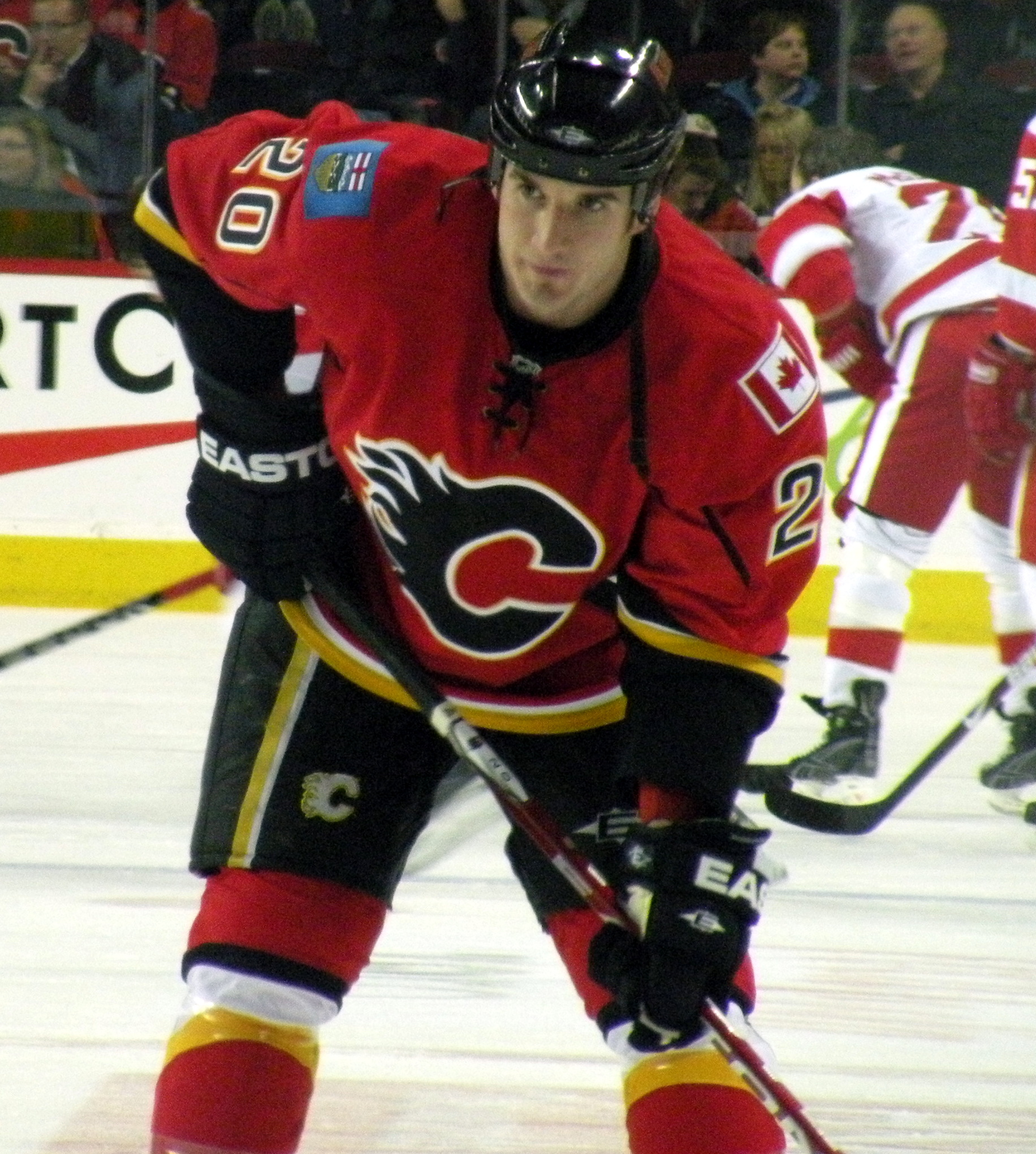
- Born: December 28, 1982 (age 43) Kindersley, Saskatchewan, Canada
- Height: 6 ft 1 in (185 cm)
- Weight: 200 lb (91 kg; 14 st 4 lb)
- Position: Left wing
- Shot: Left
- Played for: Anaheim Ducks; Columbus Blue Jackets; Edmonton Oilers; Calgary Flames; Washington Capitals
- NHL draft: Undrafted
- Playing career: 2004–2015

Curtis Jack Glencross (born December 28, 1982) is a Canadian former professional ice hockey player who played in the National Hockey League (NHL). An undrafted player, he signed with the Mighty Ducks of Anaheim as a free agent in 2004 and made his NHL debut with the team in 2007. He has also played in the NHL for the Columbus Blue Jackets, Edmonton Oilers, Calgary Flames and Washington Capitals.

Glencross was an effective goalscorer and active within the community during his time in Calgary, which led to the team naming him its recipient of the Ralph T. Scurfield Humanitarian Award in 2012. After splitting the 2014–15 season between Calgary and Washington, Glencross was unable to reach a contract deal with any NHL team and opted to retire as a player. During his playing career, Glencross was a spokesman for the Special Olympics. He has also participated with Rae Croteau Jr.'s chuckwagon racing team in the summer.

== Early life ==
Glencross was born December 28, 1982, in Kindersley, Saskatchewan, but grew up in Provost, Alberta. He is the son of Mel and Robin Glencross, and has a younger brother, Matthew, and sister, Kari. His parents both played hockey and say he inherited an intense competitive nature from them. His family moved to Red Deer, Alberta, when he was a teenager as his parents began a livestock auction business. Glencross was small for his age, standing less than five feet tall when he was 15, and as a result was often left off the top teams in minor hockey despite having the talent to play; he played Midget C hockey in Provost. He experienced a rapid growth spurt, growing a full foot in a period of 17 months, and was recruited to play Junior A hockey for the expansion Brooks Bandits of the Alberta Junior Hockey League (AJHL) in 2000. He went on to become the first Bandit alumnus to play in the NHL, and his number 17 was retired by the team in 2011.

== Playing career ==
=== College and minor professional ===
The Bandits were a last-place team both years Glencross played, but he was among the AJHL's leading goalscorers in 2001–02 with 42 goals. He went undrafted by an NHL team, but received interest from National Collegiate Athletic Association (NCAA) schools and was considering returning to Brooks for a third season of junior. Jack Kowal, assistant coach of the University of Alaska-Anchorage Seawolves, had scouted Glencross during the season. Impressed with his ability and intensity on the ice, offered Glencross a full scholarship to play for his school. Glencross played two seasons at Alaska-Anchorage between 2002 and 2004, scoring 32 goals and 57 points in 72 games. He was named the Western Collegiate Hockey Association offensive player of the week for December 15, 2003, after scoring a hat trick against the Colorado College Tigers in a 5–2 win. He led the Seawolves in goals (21) and points (34) in 2002–03.

Glencross chose to forgo his final two years of college eligibility, signing a professional contract with the Mighty Ducks of Anaheim on March 25, 2004. He was assigned to the team's American Hockey League (AHL) affiliate, the Cincinnati Mighty Ducks, to complete the 2003–04 season. He scored two goals in seven regular season games, and one more in nine playoff games. He remained with Cincinnati in 2004–05, appearing in 51 games and scoring nine points. He was moved to the Portland Pirates, also of the AHL, in 2005–06 and improved to 15 goals and 25 points in 41 games while also appearing in 19 post-season games.

=== Ducks, Blue Jackets and Oilers ===
Glencross' 2006–07 season was split between four teams. Glencross began with the Pirates, but at mid-season earned his first call-up and made his NHL debut on January 13, 2007. He scored his first goal on his first NHL shot that night, against Peter Budaj, in a 3–2 loss against the Colorado Avalanche. He played two games with Anaheim before he was traded (along with Zenon Konopka and a seventh-round draft pick) to the Columbus Blue Jackets in exchange for Mark Hartigan, Joe Motzko and a fourth-round pick on January 26. Glencross appeared in seven games with the Blue Jackets but finished the season in the AHL with the Syracuse Crunch.

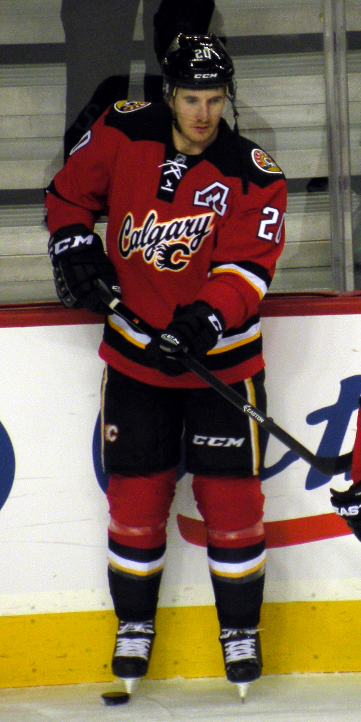
Glencross served as an alternate captain for the Flames.

Glencross established himself as an NHL regular in 2007–08. He appeared in 36 games for the Blue Jackets before being traded to the Edmonton Oilers in exchange for Dick Tärnström on February 1, 2008. Glencross appeared in 26 games for the Oilers, scoring 15 goals and 25 points in 61 games combined between Columbus and Edmonton. Though he played well with Edmonton, the Oilers did not make a contract offer, making him an unrestricted free agent. Glencross hoped to remain in Edmonton as it was close to his Red Deer home. But after the Oilers made little effort to negotiate with him, he chose to sign a three-year, $3.6 million deal with Edmonton's provincial rival, the Calgary Flames.

=== Calgary Flames ===
In his first year with the Flames, Glencross set new personal highs in games played (74), goals (13) and points (40). He missed six games in December 2008 with a knee injury, and three more early in the 2009–10 season after he was suspended for a blind-side hit on Chris Drury of the New York Rangers. He set a new personal best with 15 goals on the season that included his first NHL hat-trick in a victory over the Carolina Hurricanes. His season was ended on March 17 after suffering a leg injury when he was struck by Matt Hendricks of the Colorado Avalanche in a knee-on-knee collision.

Playing in the final year of his contract, Glencross set personal highs of 24 goals and 43 points in 2010–11. While the Flames received offers from other teams for Glencross at the trade deadline, the team chose to hold on to him though they risked losing him as an unrestricted free agent following the season. Glencross chose to remain in Calgary, agreeing to a four-year, $10.2 million contract with the Flames on May 17, 2011. Glencross felt that he could have earned a bigger contract on the open market, but chose to take less money to remain in Calgary. With 26 goals in 2011–12, Glencross finished second on the team to Jarome Iginla's 32. He was also the NHL's most efficient scorer, scoring on 23.6 percent of his shots on net.

Glencross reached several milestones in the lock-out-shortened 2012–13 season en route to leading the Flames with 15 goals. After scoring his 100th career goal, he recorded both his 100th assist and 200th point in a 5–4 victory over the Phoenix Coyotes on February 24, 2013. His season was ended prematurely by a knee injury after Anaheim's Ben Lovejoy stuck his leg out to cause a knee-on-knee collision. The injury forced Glencross out of the team's final four games of the season.

Injuries plagued Glencross throughout the 2013–14 season as he missed 15 games to a sprained knee, then suffered a high ankle sprain three weeks after his December 10 return. The injury forced him out of the line-up for nearly three months; he missed an additional 29 games before returning to action. In just the sixth game after his return, he scored his third career hat-trick in an 8–1 victory against the Edmonton Oilers.

=== Washington Capitals ===
As Glencross' contract was set to expire at the end of the 2014–15 season, his future in Calgary was placed in doubt; the team asked him for a list of teams he would agree to waive his no-trade clause to as March 2, 2015, trade deadline approached. Though the team was in playoff contention at the deadline, it still opted to move Glencross. He was traded to the Washington Capitals on March 1 in exchange for second- and third-round picks at the 2015 NHL entry draft. He made his debut with Washington two nights later. Combined between Calgary and Washington, Glencross scored 13 goals and 35 points in 71 games played. His eventually final NHL career goal occurred in the third period of Game 5 of the Conference Semifinals against the New York Rangers in the 2015 Stanley Cup playoffs to give them a 1–0 lead in a bid to finish off the Rangers, which they led in the series 3–1, and finally advance to the Conference Finals, but the Rangers thwarted it with two consecutive goals and then two more consecutive wins to eliminate them.

Despite his reduced offensive output relative to previous seasons, Glencross expected to sign with a new team as a free agent. However, when no contract offers materialized, Glencross instead accepted a professional tryout offer with the Toronto Maple Leafs. Toronto opted against signing Glencross and, after releasing him from the try-out, Glencross signed another tryout offer, with the Colorado Avalanche. After two scoreless pre-season games, he was released by the Avalanche on October 5, 2015. His first pre-season game with the Avalanche was in Calgary; the Flames recognized Glencross' contributions with the team during the game, a gesture he appreciated. However, the Avalanche also released Glencross, leaving his career in limbo as the 2015–16 NHL season began. He opted against playing in Europe in favour of remaining in Canada with his young family and, on October 20, 2015, announced his retirement as a player. Glencross played 507 games, scored 134 goals and had 275 points.

== Personal life ==
While Glencross grew up around the rodeo circuit, he did not enter into the sport until he met World Professional Chuckwagon Association driver Rae Croteau Jr. in 2005. He became interested in chuckwagon racing at the time, and while he does not race, Glencross was a part of Croteau's team in 2007 and 2008, helping around the stables.

Glencross and his wife Tanya have five children together. An active member of the community during his playing career, Glencross served as a spokesman for the Special Olympics program, and hosted an annual charity golf tournament in support of Calgary Crime Stoppers. The first event, held in 2009, raised C$100,000. Glencross is also involved with the Alberta Children's Hospital. In recognition of his community efforts, the Flames named him the 2012 recipient of the Ralph T. Scurfield Humanitarian Award, given by the team in recognition of on-ice leadership coupled with community service.

== Career statistics ==
=== Regular season and playoffs ===
			Regular season					Playoffs
Season	Team	League	GP	G	A	Pts	PIM	GP	G	A	Pts	PIM
2000–01	Brooks Bandits	AJHL	60	23	22	45	113	—	—	—	—	—
2001–02	Brooks Bandits	AJHL	53	42	26	68	—	—	—	—	—	—
2002–03	University of Alaska Anchorage	WCHA	35	11	12	23	79	—	—	—	—	—
2003–04	University of Alaska Anchorage	WCHA	37	21	13	34	79	—	—	—	—	—
2003–04	Cincinnati Mighty Ducks	AHL	7	2	1	3	6	9	1	6	7	10
2004–05	Cincinnati Mighty Ducks	AHL	51	6	3	9	63	12	2	0	2	10
2005–06	Portland Pirates	AHL	41	15	10	25	85	19	4	6	10	37
2006–07	Portland Pirates	AHL	31	6	10	16	74	—	—	—	—	—
2006–07	Anaheim Ducks	NHL	2	1	0	1	2	—	—	—	—	—
2006–07	Syracuse Crunch	AHL	29	19	16	35	53	—	—	—	—	—
2006–07	Columbus Blue Jackets	NHL	7	0	0	0	0	—	—	—	—	—
2007–08	Columbus Blue Jackets	NHL	36	6	6	12	25	—	—	—	—	—
2007–08	Edmonton Oilers	NHL	26	9	4	13	28	—	—	—	—	—
2008–09	Calgary Flames	NHL	74	13	27	40	42	6	0	3	3	12
2009–10	Calgary Flames	NHL	67	15	18	33	58	—	—	—	—	—
2010–11	Calgary Flames	NHL	79	24	19	43	59	—	—	—	—	—
2011–12	Calgary Flames	NHL	67	26	22	48	62	—	—	—	—	—
2012–13	Calgary Flames	NHL	40	15	11	26	18	—	—	—	—	—
2013–14	Calgary Flames	NHL	38	12	12	24	12	—	—	—	—	—
2014–15	Calgary Flames	NHL	53	9	19	28	39	—	—	—	—	—
2014–15	Washington Capitals	NHL	18	4	3	7	6	10	1	0	1	2
NHL totals			507	134	141	275	351	16	1	3	4	14
