= Rick Fraser (chuckwagon racer) =

Canadian professional chuckwagon racer

- Rick Fraser with 2013 World Championship Bronze
- Born: October 28, 1959 (age 66)
- Achievements: 2013 World Champion Driver 2004 World Champion Driver Ponoka Stampede Champion (1983); Klondike Derby Champion (2004, 2005) Calgary Stampede Rangeland Derby Champion Outrider (1982, 1984, 1988, 1990, 1998, 1999)
- Awards: Orville Strandquist Award (1999); Guy Weadick Award (2005)
- Statistics up to date as of April 5, 2015.

Rick Fraser (born October 28, 1959) is a Canadian professional chuckwagon racer. He is a two-time World Champion Chuckwagon Driver, a six-time Calgary Stampede Rangeland Derby Champion Outrider, and has won 20 show titles in 21 years of competing on the WPCA Pro Tour.

== Career ==
Fraser grew up in Grande Prairie, Alberta, the son of Joan (née Dorchester) and step-son to former World and Calgary Stampede Champion Chuckwagon Driver Dave Lewis. He started his chuckwagon racing career as an outrider when he was 16 in 1976, and began driving when he was 22 in 1982 on the World Professional Chuckwagon Association (WPCA) circuit. Driving his step-father's outfit, Rick became the first rookie to win a show on the WPCA Pro Tour when he captured the Strathmore Heritage Days in 1982. He was also named the WPCA Top Rookie Driver in 1982. He won his first Calgary Stampede trophy that same year as an outrider for his step-father Dave Lewis. The following year in 1983, Rick won two more show championships at the Grande Prairie Stompede and captured his first major chuckwagon show a few weeks later at the Ponoka Stampede.

Over the next 14 years, Rick only drove parts of two seasons (1985 & 1987), but continued to compete part-time as an outrider. In that time, Rick won three Calgary Stampede Rangeland Derby championships as an outrider for his uncle Dallas Dorchester in 1984, and twice more for his step-father Dave Lewis in 1988 and 1990. He would win the Calgary Stampede twice more in 1998 and 1999 as an outrider for Kelly Sutherland.

Rick returned to driving in 1998 on the WPCA Pro Tour, and qualified for his first Calgary Stampede Rangeland Derby as a driver in 1999 where he won the Orville Strandquist Award for top rookie driver (despite his early success as a driver, his Dave Lewis drove their wagon in the Calgary Stampede). He won his first show championship since returning to the driver's seat in 2002 at the Grande Prairie Stompede, and would be a regular winner ever since, capturing an additional 16 titles through the 2014 season. In 2005 Rick received the Calgary Stampede's prestigious Guy Weadick Award which is presented annually to the one chuckwagon or rodeo competitor who best embodies what the cowboy stands for, and who best typifies the spirit of the Calgary Stampede. It is based upon ability, appearance, showmanship, character, sportsmanship and cooperation with other cowboys, the arena crew, the media and the public. Rick won his first World Chuckwagon Championship in 2004 and his second in 2013, and his horses have collected an impressive 8 Calgary Stampede and WPCA Equine Outfit of Excellence awards. Rick retired at the end of the 2018 Calgary Stampede

== Professional wins ==
- 2004 World Champion Chuckwagon Driver
- 2013 World Champion Chuckwagon Driver

=== Show Wins - Driver (20) ===
- 1982 (1) Strathmore Heritage Days
- 1983 (2) Grande Prairie Stompede, Ponoka Stampede Champion Driver
- 2002 (2) Grande Prairie Stompede, Strathmore Heritage Days
- 2003 (2) Medicine Hat Exhibition & Stampede, North American Chuckwagon Championship
- 2004 (3) Rocky Mountain Turf Club Derby, Klondike Chuckwagon Derby, Strathmore Heritage Days Stmpede
- 2005 (2) North American Chuckwagon Championship, Klondike Chuckwagon Derby
- 2010 (1) Battle of the Rockies
- 2011 (2) Grande Prairie Stompede, Battle of the North
- 2013 (3) Grande Prairie Stompede, Medicine Hat Exhibition & Stampede, Battle of the North
- 2014 (2) Guy Weadick Days, Bonnyville Chuckwagon Championship

=== Major Wins - Outrider (11) ===
- 1982 (2) Calgary Stampede Rangeland Derby Champion Outrider, Calgary Stampede Aggregate Champion Outrider
- 1983 (1) Calgary Stampede Aggregate Champion Outrider
- 1984 (1) Calgary Stampede Rangeland Derby Champion Outrider
- 1988 (2) Calgary Stampede Rangeland Derby Champion Outrider, Calgary Stampede Aggregate Champion Outrider
- 1990 (2) Calgary Stampede Rangeland Derby Champion Outrider, Ponoka Stampede Champion Outrider
- 1992 (1) Ponoka Stampede Champion Outrider
- 1998 (1) Calgary Stampede Rangeland Derby Champion Outrider
- 1999 (1) Calgary Stampede Rangeland Derby Champion Outrider, Calgary Stampede Aggregate Champion Outrider

== Awards ==
- WPCA Top Rookie Driver (1982)
- Orville Strandquist Award (1999)
- WPCA Showmanship Award (2001)
- Guy Weadick Award (2005)
- WPCA Equine Award Of Excellence - "NICKLE" - Champion Left Leader (2010)
- WPCA Equine Outfit of Excellence - "MAX" - Champion Outriding Horse (2011)
- Calgary Stampede Equine Outfit of Excellence - "MAX" - Champion Outriding Horse (2012)
- WPCA Equine Outfit of Excellence - "BEAU" - Champion Outriding Horse (2012)
- Calgary Stampede Equine Outfit of Excellence - "NICKLE" - Champion Left Leader (2013)
- WPCA Equine Outfit of Excellence - "SPIERMAN" - Champion Right Leader (2013)
- GMC Sierra Cup Series (2013)
- Calgary Stampede Equine Outfit of Excellence - "LAW" - Champion Right Wheeler (2014)
- WPCA Equine Outfit of Excellence - "LAW" - Champion Right Wheeler (2014)

== Personal life ==
Rick is a third generation chuckwagon driver whose grandfather Tom Dorchester was a former World and Calgary Stampede champion. His stepfather Dave Lewis, and uncles Dallas Dorchester and Garry Dorchester were also former World and Calgary Stampede champions. Rick and his wife Sue have three children - Amy, Kaylee and Cody - and one grandchild. His son Cody is beginning his career as a chuckwagon driver.
