= Grande Prairie Stompede =

- Frequency: Annually
- Locations: Evergreen Park in Grande Prairie, Alberta
- Previous event: 2024
- Next event: 2025

The Grande Prairie Stompede is an agricultural event held typically at the end of May every year at Evergreen Park in Grande Prairie, Alberta. Recent years have seen as many as 50,000 people attending during the 5 days of Stompede. Events held at Stompede include: Rodeo, Pony Chuckwagon Racing, thoroughbred Chuckwagon Racing and usually a midway.

Originally called the Grande Prairie Chuckwagon Stompede, the event was first held in 1977. By 2014, the event had welcomed its millionth visitor, and reported attendance in excess of 50,000. The chuckwagon races are the opening event of the World Professional Chuckwagon Association season.

2020 saw the Stompede go on hiatus until 2022.
