= 2012 Pomeroy Inn & Suites Prairie Showdown =

- Host city: Grande Prairie, Alberta
- Arena: Grande Prairie Curling Club
- Dates: March 8–11
- Winner: (Alberta) Kevin Martin
- Curling club: Saville SC, Edmonton
- Skip: Kevin Martin
- Third: John Morris
- Second: Marc Kennedy
- Lead: Ben Hebert
- Finalist: (China) Liu Rui
- Women's winner: (Alberta) Shannon Kleibrink
- Skip: Shannon Kleibrink
- Third: Amy Nixon
- Second: Carolyn McRorie
- Lead: Chelsey Matson
- Finalist: (Alberta) Renée Sonnenberg

The 2012 Pomeroy Inn & Suites Prairie Showdown was held from March 8 to 11 at the Grande Prairie Curling Club in Grande Prairie, Alberta as part of the 2011–12 World Curling Tour. The event is being held in a triple knockout format. The purse for the event was a total of CAD$100,000, with the men's and women's events splitting the purse equally at CAD$50,000 apiece. The winner of each event received CAD$15,000.

Because the event planners missed the registration deadline for this season's World Curling Tour events, this year's bonspiel will not count for ranking points on the Order of Merit or the Canadian Team Ranking System.

== Men ==
=== Teams ===
Skip	Third	Second	Lead	Locale
Kurt Balderston	Les Sonnenberg	Rob Maksymetz	Del Shaughnessy	Grande Prairie, Alberta
Colin Griffith	Rob Griffith	Pete Plante	Jim Stephenson	Grande Prairie, Alberta
Tom Sallows (fourth)	Stacey Coomber	Brent Hamilton	Greg Hill	Grande Prairie, Alberta
Colton Flasch	Steve Laycock (skip)	Dallan Muyres	Kirk Muyres	Saskatoon, Saskatchewan
Liu Rui	Xu Xiaoming	Zang Jialiang	Ba Dexin	Harbin, China
Kevin Martin	John Morris	Marc Kennedy	Ben Hebert	Edmonton, Alberta
Mike McEwen	B. J. Neufeld	Matt Wozniak	Denni Neufeld	Winnipeg, Manitoba
Graham Powell	Ken Powell	Brett Vavrek		Grande Prairie, Alberta
Rollie Robinson	Nick Palinkas	Mark Pillsworth		Grande Prairie, Alberta
Jordan Steinke	Jason Ginter	Tristan Steinke	Brett Winfield	Dawson Creek, British Columbia
Brock Virtue	Braeden Moskowy	Chris Schille	D.J. Kidby	Regina, Saskatchewan
Scott Webb	Doug deBoon	Steve Byrne	John Kuran	Grande Prairie, Alberta

=== Round-robin standings ===
Red Pool	W	L
(Alberta) Kurt Balderston	4	0
(Manitoba) Mike McEwen	3	2
(China) Liu Rui	3	2
(Alberta) Graham Powell	3	2
(Alberta) Rollie Robinson	1	4
(Alberta) Scott Webb	0	5

Blue Pool	W	L
(Alberta) Kevin Martin	5	0
(Saskatchewan) Steve Laycock	4	1
(Alberta) Greg Hill	3	2
(British Columbia) Jordan Steinke	2	3
(Saskatchewan) Brock Virtue	1	4
(Alberta) Colin Griffith	0	5

=== Playoffs ===
Quarterfinals
(Alberta) Greg Hill	1
(China) Liu Rui	6
(Manitoba) Mike McEwen	6
(Saskatchewan) Steve Laycock	0

Semifinals
(Alberta) Kurt Balderston	3
(China) Liu Rui	4
(Alberta) Kevin Martin	7
(Manitoba) Mike McEwen	5

Final
(China) Liu Rui	2
(Alberta) Kevin Martin	6

== Women ==
=== Teams ===
Skip	Third	Second	Lead	Locale
Delia DeJong	Jessica Monk	Amy Janko	Aisha Veiner	Grande Prairie, Alberta
Dana Ferguson	Nikki Smith	Denise Kinghorn	Cori Morris	Calgary, Alberta
Jessie Kaufman	Nicky Kaufman	Amanda Coderre	Stephanie Enright	Edmonton, Alberta
Shannon Kleibrink	Amy Nixon	Carolyn McRorie	Chelsey Matson	Calgary, Alberta
Cathy Overton-Clapham	Jenna Loder	Ashley Howard	Cherie-Ann Loder	Winnipeg, Manitoba
Desirée Owen	Marcy Balderston	Stephanie Malekoff	Karen McNamee	Grande Prairie, Alberta
Kalynn Park	Joanne Taylor	Jessie Scheidegger	Rachelle Pidherny	Edmonton, Alberta
Renée Sonnenberg	Lawnie MacDonald	Kristie Moore	Rona Pasika	Grande Prairie, Alberta
Wang Bingyu	Liu Yin	Yue Qingshuang	Zhou Yan	Harbin, China
Crystal Webster	Erin Carmody	Geri-Lynn Ramsay	Samantha Preston	Calgary, Alberta

=== Round-robin standings ===
Yellow Pool	W	L
(Alberta) Renée Sonnenberg	4	0
(Alberta) Kalynn Park	3	2
(Alberta) Desirée Owen	2	2
(Alberta) Dana Ferguson	2	3
(Alberta) Crystal Webster	0	4

Green Pool	W	L
(Alberta) Shannon Kleibrink	4	0
(Alberta) Jessie Kaufman	3	2
(China) Wang Bingyu	2	3
(Manitoba) Cathy Overton-Clapham	2	3
(Alberta) Delia DeJong	1	3

=== Playoffs ===
Quarterfinals
(Alberta) Jessie Kaufman	4
(Alberta) Desirée Owen	6
(Alberta) Kalynn Park	6
(China) Wang Bingyu	4

Semifinals
(Alberta) Renée Sonnenberg	7
(Alberta) Desirée Owen	4
(Alberta) Shannon Kleibrink	4
(Alberta) Kalynn Park	2

Final
(Alberta) Renée Sonnenberg	3
(Alberta) Shannon Kleibrink	5
