= Florence LaDue =

American rodeo performer (1883–1951)

Florence "Flores" LaDue
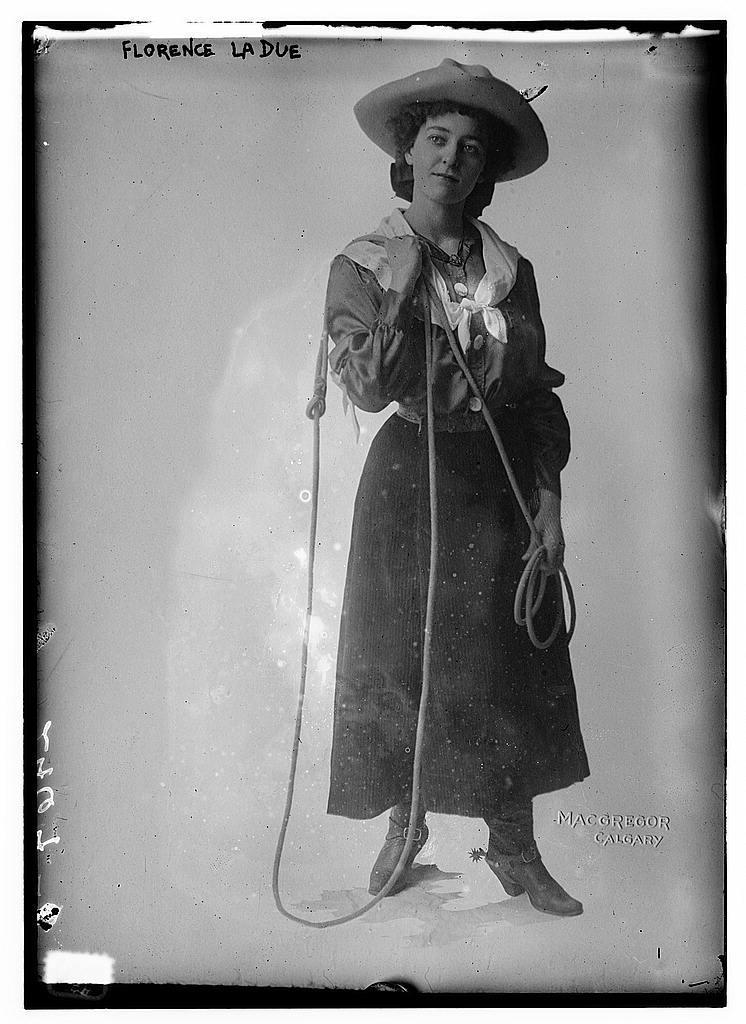
- LaDue in Calgary circa 1913
- Born: Grace Maud Bensel; June 27, 1883; Montevideo, Minnesota, U.S.
- Died: August 9, 1951 (aged 68); Los Angeles, California, U.S.
- Occupation: Cowgirl
- Spouse: George Guy Weadick (m. 1906)

Florence "Flores" LaDue (June 27, 1883 - August 9, 1951) was a vaudeville performer and champion trick roper. Together with her husband, cowboy Guy Weadick, she organized and produced the first Calgary Stampede. LaDue is credited as the inventor of the rope trick known as the "Texas Skip."

== Biography ==
Born Grace Maud Bensel in Montevideo, Minnesota, her mother died while she was an infant and her father, C.D. Bensel, was a criminal lawyer and later a judge. She spent most of her young life on a Sioux reservation where her grandfather was the government agent.

Bensel left home, by some accounts running away to join a wild west show. By 1905 she was performing with the Cummins's Wild West Show and Indian Congress under the name Florence LaDue. and began performing under the name Florence LaDue. At a show in Chicago in 1905, she met Guy Weadick, an accomplished rider and roper from Canada. The two married on November 17, 1906.

Florence LaDue and Guy Weadick led a peripatetic life for the next five years. They worked with John P. Kirk’s Elite Vaudeville co. in 1908 and were appearing with Will Rogers’ Wild West show in 1910. They had a stint on Broadway in ‘Wyoming Days’ and did the Keith-Albee, Orpheum, and Pantages vaudeville circuits, as well as appearances in Glasgow, London, and Paris. LaDue performed solo, with her husband as "Weadick and LaDue," and in larger groups.

In 1911, LaDue appeared in the Miller Brothers 101 Show, where she squared off against their star performer, "America's First Cowgirl," Lucille Muhall. By 1912, she and her husband had settled in Calgary, Alberta, where LaDue helped her husband found the Calgary Stampede. In September of the same year, LaDue defeated Muhall in competition, becoming the women's champion in fancy and trickroping, a title she maintained until her retirement in 1927.

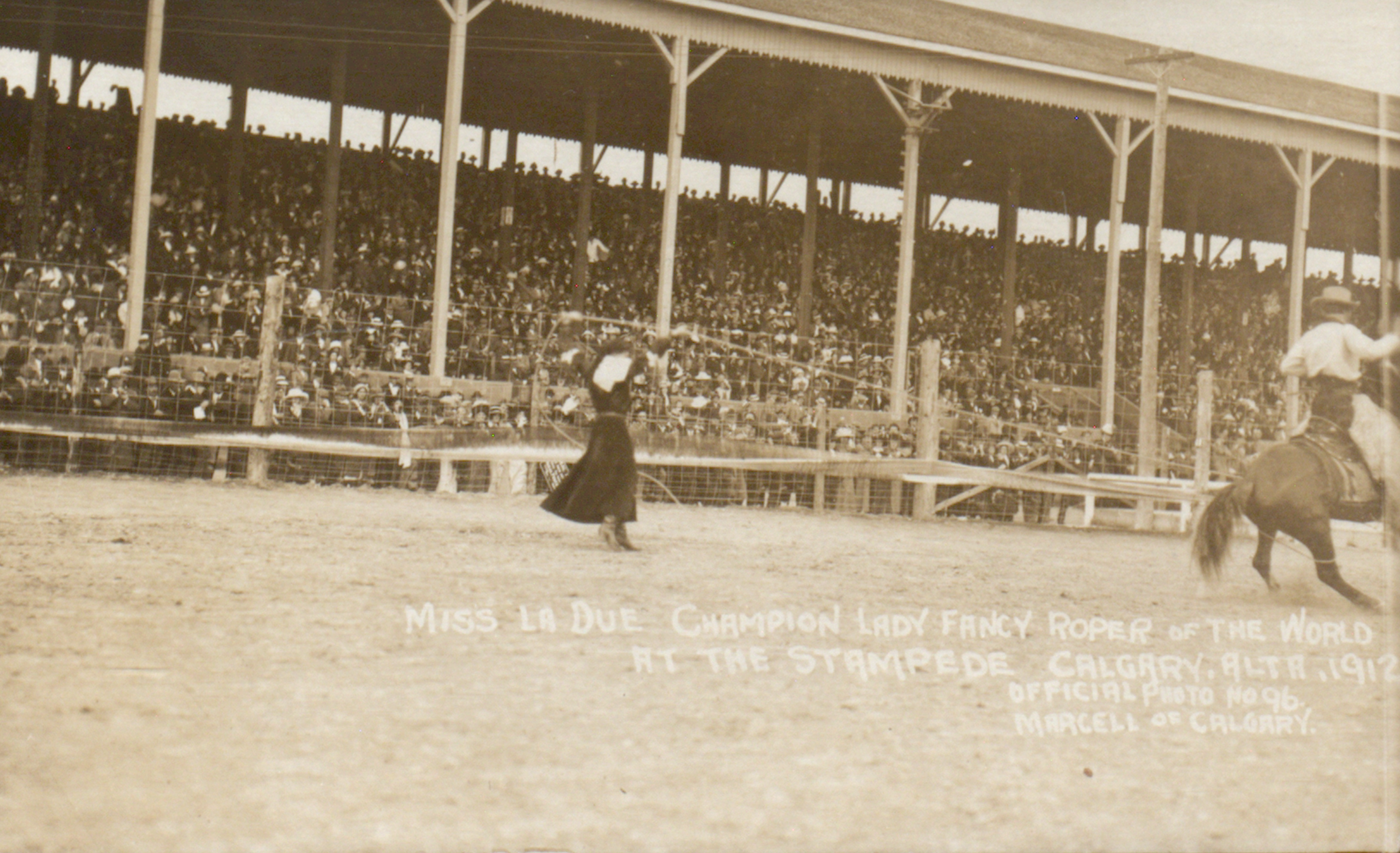
Postcard of Miss La Due, Champion Lady Fancy Roper of the World at the Stampede. Calgary, Alta. 1912.

Towards the end of her life, in the hopes of improving LaDue's failing health, the couple sold their home outside Calgary and moved to Phoenix, Arizona. LaDue died of heart failure in 1951.

== Legacy ==
In 2001 she was inducted into the National Cowgirl Museum and Hall of Fame.

LaDue is profiled in a children's book called Howdy, I'm Flores LaDue by Ayesha Clough, with illustrations by Hugh Rookwood and Keegan Starlight, published in 2022 by Red Barn Books. ISBN 978-1-989915-04-2

In Calgary, a 17th Avenue extension into Stampede Park was named "Flores LaDue Parade" in her honour in 2024.
