= 2013 Pomeroy Inn & Suites Prairie Showdown =

- Host city: Grande Prairie, Alberta
- Arena: Grande Prairie Curling Club
- Dates: March 14–17
- Men's winner: (China) Liu Rui
- Skip: Liu Rui
- Third: Xu Xiaoming
- Second: Zang Jialiang
- Lead: Ba Dexin
- Finalist: (Manitoba) Mike McEwen
- Women's winner: (Switzerland) Mirjam Ott
- Skip: Mirjam Ott
- Third: Carmen Schäfer
- Second: Carmen Küng
- Lead: Janine Greiner
- Finalist: (Ontario) Tracy Horgan

The 2013 Pomeroy Inn & Suites Prairie Showdown was held from March 14 to 17 at the Grande Prairie Curling Club in Grande Prairie, Alberta as part of the 2012–13 World Curling Tour. The men's event was held in a triple-knockout format, while the women's event was held in a round robin format.

== Men ==
=== Teams ===
The teams are listed as follows:

Skip	Third	Second	Lead	Locale
Kurt Balderston	Les Sonnenberg	Rob Maksymetz	Del Shaughnessy	Sexsmith, Alberta
Brendan Bottcher	Micky Lizmore	Bradley Thiessen	Karrick Martin	Edmonton, Alberta
Jim Cotter	Jason Gunnlaugson	Tyrel Griffith	Rick Sawatsky	Kelowna/Vernon, British Columbia
Niklas Edin	Sebastian Kraupp	Fredrik Lindberg	Viktor Kjäll	Karlstad, Sweden
Rob Fowler	Allan Lyburn	Richard Daneault	Derek Samagalski	Brandon, Manitoba
Brad Gushue	Adam Casey	Brett Gallant	Geoff Walker	St. John's, Newfoundland and Labrador
Kevin Koe	Pat Simmons	Carter Rycroft	Nolan Thiessen	Calgary, Alberta
Steve Laycock	Kirk Muyres	Colton Flasch	Dallan Muyres	Saskatoon, Saskatchewan
Liu Rui	Xu Xiaoming	Zang Jialiang	Ba Dexin	Harbin, China
William Lyburn	James Kirkness	Alex Forrest	Tyler Forrest	Winnipeg, Manitoba
Mike McEwen	B. J. Neufeld	Matt Wozniak	Denni Neufeld	Winnipeg, Manitoba
Kevin Park	Darren Moulding	Tom Sallows	Greg Hill	Edmonton, Alberta
Jordan Steinke	Jason Ginter	Tristan Steinke	Brett Winfield	Dawson Creek, British Columbia
Charley Thomas	J. D. Lind	Dominic Daemen	Matthew Ng	Calgary, Alberta
Daylan Vavrek	Carter Lautner	Daniel Wenzek	Cody Smith	Edmonton, Alberta

=== Knockout results ===
The draw is listed as follows:

==== A event ====
First Knockout		Semifinals		Qualifier 1
(Alberta) Kevin Koe	6
(Alberta) Colin Griffith	4	(Alberta) Kevin Koe	5
(Alberta) Kevin Park	2	(Manitoba) Rob Fowler	3
(Manitoba) Rob Fowler	8			(Alberta) Kevin Koe	3
(Manitoba) William Lyburn	1			(Sweden) Niklas Edin	7
(Alberta) Charley Thomas	9	(Alberta) Charley Thomas	4
(Alberta) Daylan Vavrek	4	(Sweden) Niklas Edin	9
(Sweden) Niklas Edin	6

First Knockout		Semifinals		Qualifier 2
(Manitoba) Mike McEwen	4
(Alberta) Kurt Balderston	6	(Alberta) Kurt Balderston	3
(Saskatchewan) Steve Laycock	7	(Saskatchewan) Steve Laycock	5
(Alberta) Brendan Bottcher	6			(Saskatchewan) Steve Laycock	3
(British Columbia) Jim Cotter	4			(China) Liu Rui	5
(China) Liu Rui	5	(China) Liu Rui	5
(British Columbia) Jordan Steinke	6	(Newfoundland and Labrador) Brad Gushue	4
(Newfoundland and Labrador) Brad Gushue	7

==== B event ====
Second Knockout
(Manitoba) Mike McEwen	8
(Alberta) Brendan Bottcher	3
(British Columbia) Jim Cotter	7
(British Columbia) Jordan Steinke	0

Quarterfinals
(Manitoba) Rob Fowler	3
(Manitoba) Mike McEwen	4
(Alberta) Charley Thomas	6
(British Columbia) Jim Cotter	3

Semifinals
(Manitoba) Mike McEwen	7
(Alberta) Charley Thomas	4

Qualifier 3
(Saskatchewan) Steve Laycock	0
(Manitoba) Mike McEwen	4

Second Knockout
(Alberta) Colin Griffith	2
(Alberta) Kevin Park	6
(Manitoba) William Lyburn	5
(Alberta) Daylan Vavrek	3

Quarterfinals
(Alberta) Kurt Balderston	5
(Alberta) Kevin Park	0
(Newfoundland and Labrador) Brad Gushue	7
(Manitoba) William Lyburn	6

Semifinals
(Alberta) Kurt Balderston	2
(Newfoundland and Labrador) Brad Gushue	3

Qualifier 4
(Alberta) Kevin Koe	4
(Newfoundland and Labrador) Brad Gushue	3

==== C event ====
Third Knockout		Quarterfinals		Semifinals		Qualifier 5
				(Alberta) Charley Thomas	5
(Alberta) Brendan Bottcher	6			(Alberta) Brendan Bottcher	2
(Manitoba) William Lyburn	5	(Alberta) Brendan Bottcher	5
(British Columbia) Jordan Steinke	6	(British Columbia) Jordan Steinke	4
(Alberta) Kevin Park	4					(Alberta) Charley Thomas	2
						(Newfoundland and Labrador) Brad Gushue	7

Third Knockout		Quarterfinals		Semifinals		Qualifier 6
				(Alberta) Kurt Balderston	6
(Alberta) Colin Griffith	6			(Manitoba) Rob Fowler	3
(British Columbia) Jim Cotter	7	(British Columbia) Jim Cotter	3
(Alberta) Daylan Vavrek	4	(Manitoba) Rob Fowler	8
(Manitoba) Rob Fowler	5					(Alberta) Kurt Balderston	4
						(Saskatchewan) Steve Laycock	7

=== Playoffs ===
Quarterfinals
(Alberta) Kevin Koe	3
(Saskatchewan) Steve Laycock	2
(Manitoba) Mike McEwen	6
(Newfoundland and Labrador) Brad Gushue	3

Semifinals
(China) Liu Rui	6
(Alberta) Kevin Koe	4
(Sweden) Niklas Edin	4
(Manitoba) Mike McEwen	9

Final
(China) Liu Rui	5
(Manitoba) Mike McEwen	3

== Women ==
=== Teams ===
The teams are listed as follows:

Skip	Third	Second	Lead	Locale
Cathy Auld	Janet Murphy	Stephanie Gray	Melissa Foster	Mississauga, Ontario
Cheryl Bernard	Susan O'Connor	Lori Olson-Johns	Shannon Aleksic	Calgary, Alberta
Chelsea Carey	Kristy McDonald	Kristen Foster	Lindsay Titheridge	Winnipeg, Manitoba
Laura Crocker	Sarah Wilkes	Rebecca Pattison	Jen Gates	Edmonton, Alberta
Delia DeJong	Stephanie Yanishewski	Janelle Sakamoto	Heather Stewart	Sexsmith, Alberta
Amber Holland	Jolene Campbell	Brooklyn Lemon	Dailene Sivertson	Regina, Saskatchewan
Tracy Horgan	Jenn Seabrook	Jenna Enge	Amanda Gates	Sudbury, Ontario
Jennifer Jones	Kaitlyn Lawes	Jill Officer	Dawn Askin	Winnipeg, Manitoba
Shannon Kleibrink	Bronwen Webster	Kalynn Park	Chelsey Matson	Calgary, Alberta
Stefanie Lawton	Sherry Anderson	Sherri Singler	Marliese Kasner	Saskatoon, Saskatchewan
Sherry Middaugh	Jo-Ann Rizzo	Lee Merklinger	Leigh Armstrong	Coldwater, Ontario
Kristie Moore	Blaine Richards	Michelle Dykstra	Amber Cheveldave	Grande Prairie, Alberta
Heather Nedohin	Beth Iskiw	Jessica Mair	Laine Peters	Edmonton, Alberta
Mirjam Ott	Carmen Schäfer	Carmen Küng	Janine Greiner	Davos, Switzerland
Renée Sonnenberg	Lawnie MacDonald	Cary-Anne Sallows	Rona Pasika	Edmonton, Alberta
Barb Spencer	Katie Spencer	Ainsley Champagne	Raunora Westcott	Winnipeg, Manitoba
Valerie Sweeting	Dana Ferguson	Joanne Taylor	Rachelle Pidherny	Edmonton, Alberta
Crystal Webster	Erin Carmody	Geri-Lynn Ramsay	Samantha Preston	Calgary, Alberta

=== Round Robin Standings ===
Final Round Robin Standings

Key
Teams to Playoffs
Teams to Tiebreaker

Pool A	W	L
(Alberta) Heather Nedohin	5	0
(Switzerland) Mirjam Ott	4	1
(Saskatchewan) Amber Holland	3	2
(Saskatchewan) Stefanie Lawton	2	3
(Alberta) Valerie Sweeting	1	4
(Alberta) Delia DeJong	0	5

Pool B	W	L
(Ontario) Cathy Auld	3	2
(Alberta) Shannon Kleibrink	3	2
(Alberta) Cheryl Bernard	3	2
(Manitoba) Jennifer Jones	3	2
(Alberta) Laura Crocker	2	3
(Alberta) Kristie Moore	1	4

Pool C	W	L
(Manitoba) Chelsea Carey	4	1
(Ontario) Tracy Horgan	3	2
(Alberta) Crystal Webster	3	2
(Ontario) Sherry Middaugh	2	3
(Alberta) Renée Sonnenberg	2	3
(Manitoba) Barb Spencer	1	4

=== Tiebreakers ===
Team	Final
(Alberta) Crystal Webster	2
(Ontario) Tracy Horgan	5

Team	Final
(Manitoba) Jennifer Jones	7
(Alberta) Cheryl Bernard	8

=== Playoffs ===
Quarterfinals
(Alberta) Heather Nedohin	2
(Ontario) Tracy Horgan	6
(Saskatchewan) Amber Holland	6
(Alberta) Shannon Kleibrink	4
(Manitoba) Chelsea Carey	5
(Ontario) Cathy Auld	4
(Alberta) Cheryl Bernard	5
(Switzerland) Mirjam Ott	6

Semifinals
(Ontario) Tracy Horgan	6
(Saskatchewan) Amber Holland	5
(Manitoba) Chelsea Carey	4
(Switzerland) Mirjam Ott	6

Final
(Ontario) Tracy Horgan	5
(Switzerland) Mirjam Ott	6
