= Pomeroy Inn & Suites Prairie Showdown =

The Pomeroy Inn & Suites Prairie Showdown was an annual bonspiel, or curling tournament, that took place at the Grande Prairie Curling Club in Grande Prairie, Alberta. The bonspiel was played in a triple knockout format. The bonspiel was started in 2012 as part of the World Curling Tour.

The event was created in order to address the relative lack of events in the World Curling Tour in the weeks leading up to the Players' Championship. Teams are invited to participate in the bonspiel based on certain qualifications. On both the men's and women's sides, teams were chosen from the Peace Region, the rest of Alberta, from a sponsor's exemption, and from the World Curling Tour's Order of Merit.

The event was last held in 2015 and the city's stop on the World Curling Tour was replaced by the smaller Grande Prairie Cash Spiel.

== Past champions ==
=== Men ===
Year	Winning team	Runner up team	Purse (CAD)
2012	(Alberta) Kevin Martin, John Morris, Marc Kennedy, Ben Hebert	(China) Liu Rui, Xu Xiaoming, Zang Jialiang, Ba Dexin	50,000
2013	(China) Liu Rui, Xu Xiaoming, Zang Jialiang, Ba Dexin	(Manitoba) Mike McEwen, B. J. Neufeld, Matt Wozniak, Denni Neufeld	50,000
2014	(Manitoba) Mike McEwen, B. J. Neufeld, Matt Wozniak, Denni Neufeld	(Manitoba) Jeff Stoughton, Jon Mead, Reid Carruthers, Mark Nichols	50,000
2015	(Manitoba) Mike McEwen, B. J. Neufeld, Matt Wozniak, Denni Neufeld	(Sweden) Niklas Edin, Oskar Eriksson, Kristian Lidström, Christoffer Sundgren	50,000

=== Women ===
Year	Winning team	Runner up team	Purse (CAD)
2012	(Alberta) Shannon Kleibrink, Amy Nixon, Carolyn McRorie, Chelsey Matson	(Alberta) Renée Sonnenberg, Lawnie MacDonald, Kristie Moore, Rona Pasika	50,000
2013	(Switzerland) Mirjam Ott, Carmen Schäfer, Carmen Küng, Janine Greiner	(Ontario) Tracy Horgan, Jenn Horgan, Jenna Enge, Amanda Gates	50,000
2014	(Switzerland) Silvana Tirinzoni, Manuela Siegrist, Esther Neuenschwander, Marlene Albrecht	(Scotland) Eve Muirhead, Anna Sloan, Vicki Adams, Claire Hamilton	50,000
2015	(Ontario) Rachel Homan, Emma Miskew, Joanne Courtney, Lisa Weagle	(Switzerland) Silvana Tirinzoni, Lee Merklinger, Esther Neuenschwander, Marlene Albrecht	$50,000
