= World Professional Chuckwagon Association =

Sports association promoting chuckwagon racing

- Company type: Association
- Genre: Sport
- Founded: Calgary, Canada
- Headquarters: Calgary, Alberta, Canada
- Number of locations: Grande Prairie, Saskatoon, Medicine Hat, High River, Ponoka, Calgary, Strathmore, Dawson Creek, Rocky Mountain House, Balzac,
- Area served: Alberta, British Columbia, Saskatchewan
- Website: WPCA.com or Halfmileofhell.com

The World Professional Chuckwagon Association (WPCA) is an association made up of professional cowboys and business people with an interest in preserving western heritage and providing family entertainment. The WPCA promotes and presents chuckwagon racing as a professional sport throughout North America and the world. The WPCA is a close-knit community that mentors its new drivers in safety and professionalism to preserve the integrity of the WPCA and chuckwagon racing in general.

Based in Calgary, Alberta, each summer the WPCA organizes its race season, which is known as the WPCA Pro Tour. It is the most senior and highest level of professional chuckwagon racing in the world, offering the richest purses and highest tarp prices on any other recognized chuckwagon association. Also, outside of the WPCA Pro Tour, WPCA chuckwagon drivers race for ten days at the Calgary Stampede Rangeland Derby in Calgary, Alberta and three days at the Colonial Days Fair in Lloydminster, Saskatchewan - both of which feature not only drivers that compete on the WPCA Pro Tour, but some drivers from another chuckwagon racing circuit - the Canadian Professional Chuckwagon Association (CPCA).

The WPCA board of directors is made up of elected officers and driver directors with a long-term goal of providing full-time employment for the chuckwagon drivers. The officers of the WPCA are a volunteer advisory group handling the day-to-day business of the association.

== The WPCA Pro Tour ==
The 2020 WPCA Pro Tour is composed of 41 race days over 8 cities and towns at the following locations: Grande Prairie, Saskatoon, Medicine Hat, High River, Ponoka, Strathmore, Bonnyville, Dawson Creek Rocky Mountain House and Balzac. In addition, there are 10 additional race days including the Calgary Stampede, for the top wagons in the World Professional Chuckwagon Association and the Canadian Professional Chuckwagon Association (CPCA), and the Lloydminster Colonial Days Fair, an optional meet between both associations for drivers who did not qualify for the Calgary Stampede

== Popularity of WPCA Chuckwagon Racing ==
According to John Down, Alberta Sports Hall of Fame sportswriter for the Calgary Herald, "Chuckwagon racing is the 3rd biggest spectators sport in Alberta behind hockey and pro football." Live attendance is nearly three-quarters of a million people annually, and live radio coverage of the entire WPCA Pro Tour as well as the Calgary Stampede Rangeland Derby is broadcast to an estimated audience of 250,000 per night on satellite radio via Rural Radio on SiriusXM Channel 147, with several thousands more outside the listening area tuning in over the internet via the official WPCA website at halfmileofhell.com or wpca.com. The popularity of WPCA chuckwagon racing inspired a web-based video reality series on chuckwagon racing called "Half Mile of Hell". Prior to being a web-video series, "Half Mile of Hell" was a reality based television program on the Outdoor Life Network (OLN).

== Notable Drivers ==
The biggest names in the sport's history have all raced with the WPCA or its predecessors (Cowboys Protective Association (CPA), Canadian Rodeo Cowboys Association (CRCA), Canadian Professional Rodeo Association (CPRA)). Some of the notable chuckwagon drivers that have each won either a Canadian/World Championship or a Calgary Stampede Rangeland Derby/Aggregate Championship are Ray Mitsuing, Edgar Baptiste, Logan Gorst, Kelly Sutherland, Rick Fraser, Kirk Sutherland, Jason Glass, Luke Tournier, Todd Baptiste, Troy Dorchester, Chanse Vigen, and Kurt Bensmiller.

== History of Chuckwagon Racing ==
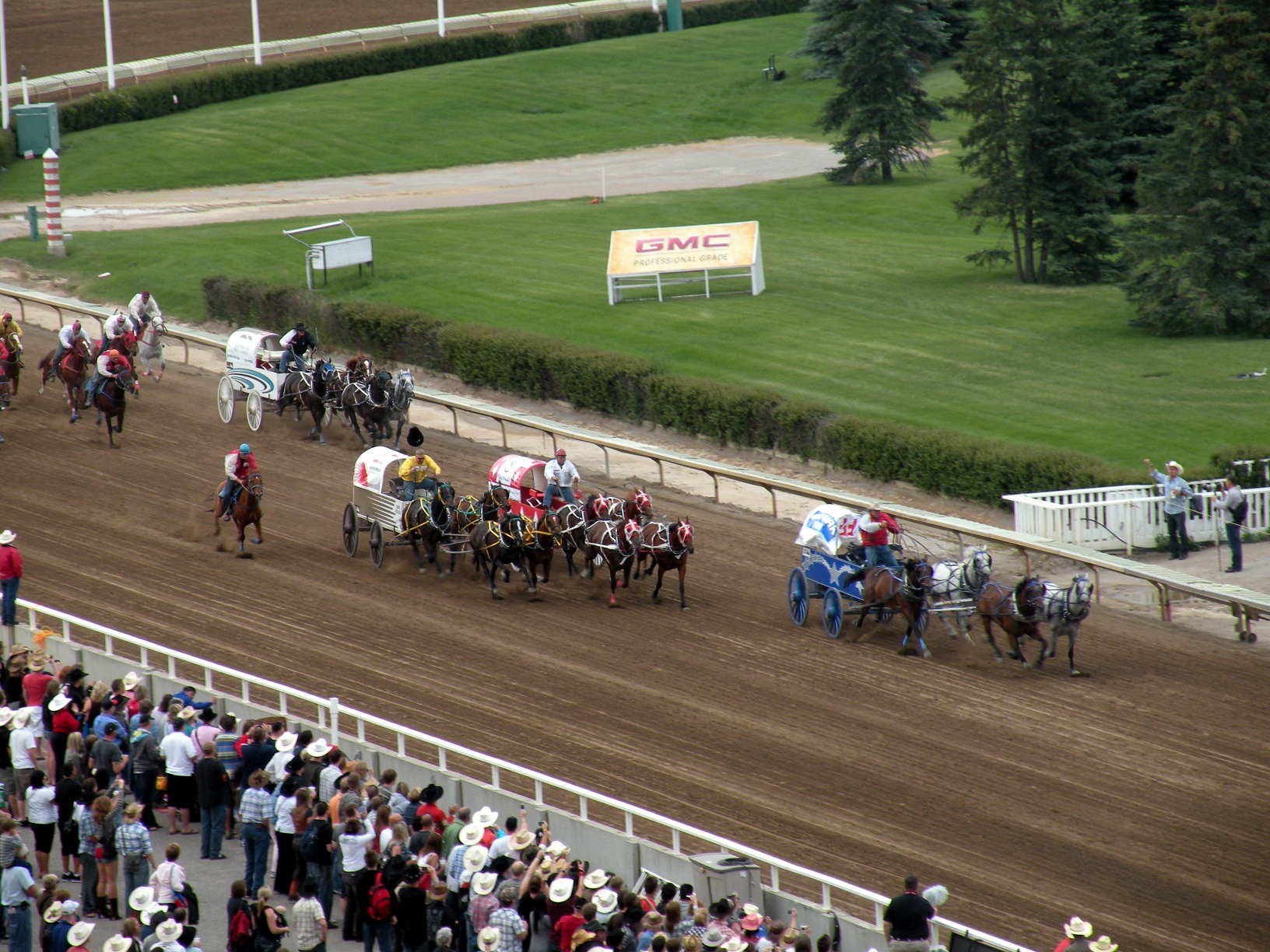
Chuckwagon racing at the Calgary Stampede.

While the origin of chuckwagon racing is debated, the idea of staging a chuckwagon race as an actual "event" was dreamed up by Calgary Stampede founder Guy Weadick. There are many thoughts on what inspired Guy Weadick's dream.

It has been suggested that Guy Weadick saw match races at the 1922 Gleichen (Alberta) Stampede between farm wagons pulled by 4 horses. Or, growing up on cattle ranches, Weadick witnessed many impromptu races between ranch outfits at the end of a round-up where the wagons would race to the nearest town saloon and the last ones there had to buy the first round of drinks.

Former Calgary Stampede arena director Jack Dillon recalled a customary gathering of pioneers and cattlemen in Miles City, Montana where ranch outfits would meet 4 miles from town, the mayor would ride out and start the race to the centre of town where the first outfit there got the best camping spot the town could offer. There were also the stories from the great land rushes in South Dakota and Oklahoma.

The most popular thought is that at the 1919 Victory Stampede in Calgary, cooks from 2 chuckwagons - who upon completion of serving a barbecue in front of the grandstand - loaded up their chuckwagons and raced down the track to see who could get to the exit gates first much to the pleasure of the grandstand crowd. Others claim that "Sundown" or "Wildhorse" Jack Morton, an original participant in the first official races, was the one who suggested the idea to Guy Weadick.

Whether it one single event of a combination of events that inspired the dream, what matters most is that the dream was realized by Guy Weadick, and the first "official" races took place in 1923 at the Calgary Stampede with just 6 outfits participating. Race rules, for all intents and purposes, were originally non-existent and were added every night of that first competition.

Over the years, rules and equipment have changed, but what has remained consistent is the entertainment value of chuckwagon races. The success of the first races of 1923 saw many other communities throughout Alberta and abroad adding chuckwagon races to their local rodeos and fairs in the years to follow. This became the basis of the WPCA Pro Tour as we know it today.
