= Grande Prairie =

City in Alberta, Canada

- City
- City of Grande Prairie
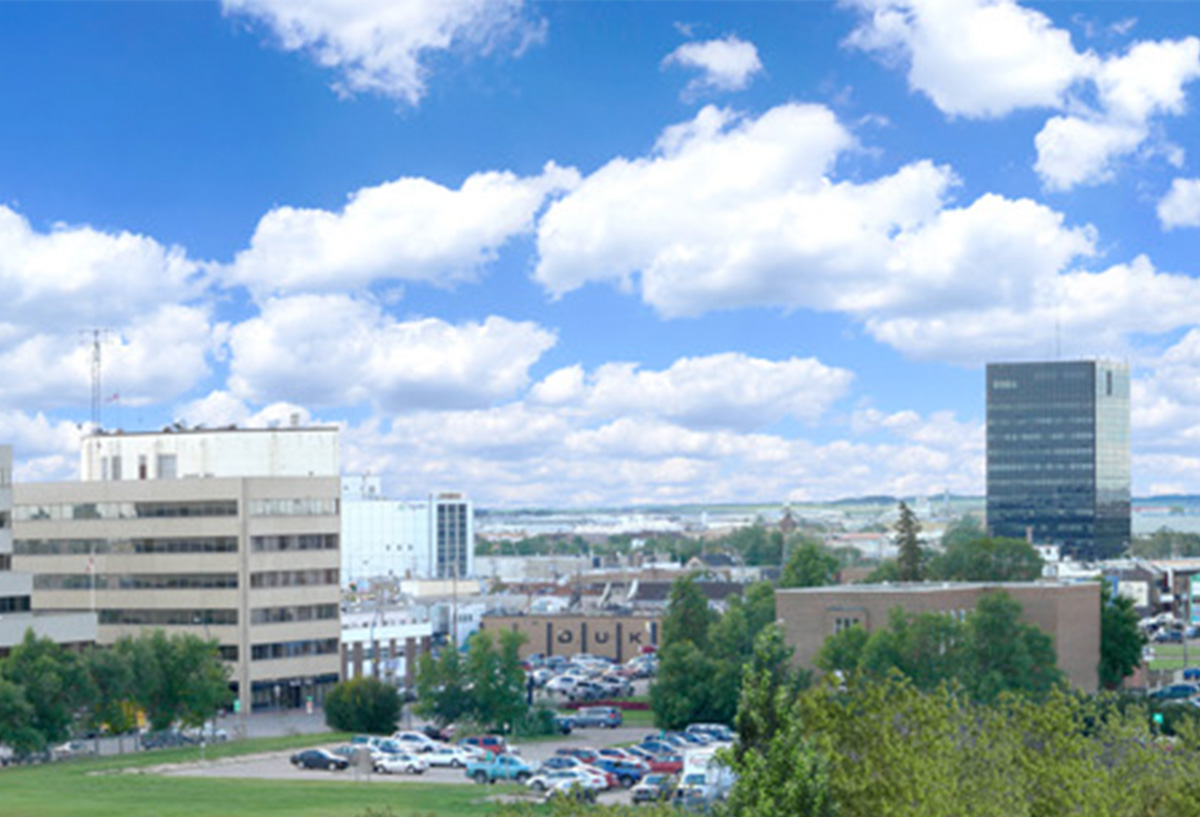
- Skyline of Grande Prairie viewed from the northeast

- Seal
- Nickname: Swan City
- City boundaries

- Location in Alberta Location in Canada Location in Grande Prairie County
- Coordinates: 55°10′15″N 118°47′46″W
- Country: Canada
- Province: Alberta
- Region: Northern Alberta
- Planning region: Upper Peace
- Municipal district: County of Grande Prairie No. 1
- Federal electoral district: Grande Prairie-Mackenzie
- Provincial electoral districts: Grande Prairie; Grande Prairie-Wapiti
- Incorporated
  - Village: April 30, 1914
  - Town: March 15, 1919
  - City: January 1, 1958

Government
  - Mayor: Jackie Clayton
  - Governing body: Grande Prairie City Council: Grant Berg; Dylan Bressey; Leonard Auger; Jena Flach; Wade Pilat; Kevin O'Toole; Mike O'Connor; Chris Thiessen
  - City Manager: Robert Nicolay (Interim)
  - MP: Chris Warkentin (Conservative)
  - MLA: Nolan Dyck (UCP) Ron Wiebe (UCP)

Area (2021)
  - Land: 132.71 km^{2} (51.24 sq mi)
- Elevation: 650 m (2,130 ft)

Population (2021)
  - Total: 64,141
  - Density: 483.3/km^{2} (1,252/sq mi)
  - Municipal census (2024): 70,385
- Time zone: UTC−06:00 (Alberta Time)
- Forward sortation areas: T8V - T8X
- Area codes: 780, 587, 825, 368
- Highways: 40, 43, 43X
- Waterways: Wapiti River Bear River (Bear Creek)
- Website: cityofgp.com

Grande Prairie is a city in northwestern Alberta, Canada, within the southern portion of an area known as Peace River Country. It is located at the intersection of Highway 43 (part of the CANAMEX Corridor) and Highway 40 (the Bighorn Highway), approximately 456 kilometres (283 mi) northwest of the provincial capital, Edmonton. The city is surrounded by the County of Grande Prairie No. 1.

Grande Prairie was the seventh-largest city in Alberta in 2021, with a population of 63,166, and is Canada's northernmost city with more than 50,000 people.

The city has adopted the trumpeter swan as its official symbol due to its proximity to the bird's migration route and its summer nesting grounds. For that reason, Grande Prairie is sometimes nicknamed the Swan City. The dinosaur has also emerged as an unofficial symbol of the city due to paleontological discoveries in the areas north and west of Grande Prairie.

== History ==
The Grande Prairie area was historically known as Buffalo Plains, after the buffalo who would traverse the large prairie which lies to the north, east, and west of it. Émile Grouard, a Roman Catholic Priest, was the first to refer to the area as La Grande Prairie. In the 18th century, the prairie was occupied by bands of the Dane-zaa (Beaver) peoples, who began, in the early 19th century, trading with the North West Company at Dunvegan. The earliest recorded reference to the prairie was by Hudson Bay trader Samuel Black in 1824.

In 1880, as a result of the fur trade war between the Hudson Bay Company (which merged with the North West Company in 1821), and independent fur traders, centering around Dunvegan, a Hudson's Bay Company outpost called La Grande Prairie was established by George Kennedy. The post was established South of Dunvegan and 21 km (13 mi) north west of the present day city of Grande Prairie, south east of La Glace Lake, and west of what is now the Town of Sexsmith (the 1896 version of this building was moved and restored and now stands near the Grande Prairie Museum).

In the late 19th century, the prairie was settled by Cree and Iroquois from around Jasper and Lac Ste. Anne. When 17 townships were surveyed for homesteading in 1909, a land rush soon followed, with many settlers arriving over the Edson Trail. In 1910, the Grande Prairie Townsite was sub-divided. By 1912, it included a bank, hotel, post office, and land office, making it a district metropolis. In 1916, it became the terminus of the Edmonton, Dunvegan and British Columbia Railway from Edmonton.

The Edson Trail from Edson to Grande Prairie was opened in 1911 as a means for settlers to reach the Grande Prairie area. It was basically nothing more than a tract of clear cut bush and forest, and was thus a very difficult route for many settlers, especially during wet weather. Because of this, large scale settlement came late compared to other major farming regions further south in Canada. Grande Prairie was incorporated as a village by the province of Alberta in 1914, but it was not until the arrival of the railway in 1916 that farmland quickly expanded as waves of settlers came into the Peace region.

The arrival of the railway and the increased settlement in the area drove up Grande Prairie's population past the 1,000 mark, allowing it to incorporate as a town on March 27, 1919. A local recession in the 1920s caused a temporary depopulation of Grande Prairie. But the population rebounded afterwards by the 1930s, by which time the population had reached 1,464. Settlement continued unabated even into the 1930s during the Dust Bowl era because the Peace Region was able to escape the severe drought conditions that plagued the Canadian Prairies further south at the time.

The Second World War saw the US and Canadian military establish Grande Prairie as a part of the Northwest Staging Route and for the construction of the Alaska Highway from Dawson Creek to Alaska. Although Dawson Creek was chosen as the major starting point of the construction of the Alaska Highway, Grande Prairie was a major stopover point for military aircraft during the war, and benefited economically from this.

Although Grande Prairie was well located in the southern edge of the Peace Country, it was competing with the towns of Peace River and Dawson Creek for the title of the most important centre of commerce and agriculture in the region until the late 1950s, when its population growth began to outstrip these towns as oil and natural gas exploration was underway in the Peace Region, especially since the first major discovery of oil further south in Leduc near Edmonton in 1947 and the construction of a large pulp mill south of the city in the early 1970s.

The construction and paving of Highway 43 (originally sections of Highways 2, 34, and 43 from the BC border to the Yellowhead Highway just west of Edmonton) in 1956 cut down on the travel time by road significantly, further enhancing Grande Prairie's accessibility and economic status.

The town of Grande Prairie was incorporated as a city in 1958. At that time, its population was approximately 7,600.

The opening of the Procter & Gamble kraft pulp mill in 1972 and the discovery of the Elmworth deep basin gas field spurred an economic boom. Grande Prairie's population went from just over 12,000 in the early 1970s to over 24,000 by the time the oil boom went bust in 1981.

In the five years from 2001 to 2006, Grande Prairie was one of the fastest-growing cities in Canada, growing from 37,000 to 47,000 people. After 2006, and with another recession, the population decreased slightly, followed by a slow increase to just over 69,000 by 2018.

== Geography ==
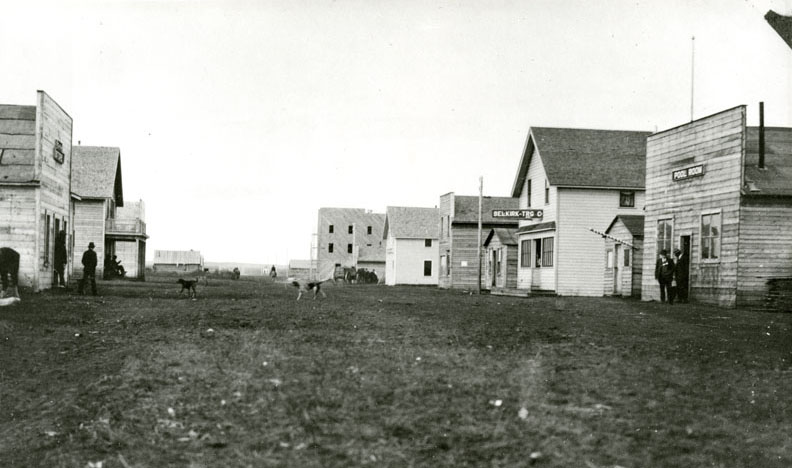
A view of downtown Grande Prairie, circa 1914

Grande Prairie is located just north of the 55th parallel north, and is 465 km (289 mi) northwest of Edmonton, lying at an elevation of 669 metres (2,195 ft) above sea level. The city is surrounded by farmland to the north, east, and west. To the south lies a vast boreal forest with aspen, tamarack, lodgepole pine, jack pine, and black spruce extending well into the foothills of the Canadian Rockies south and southwest of the city. The city actually lies on the southern edge of aspen parkland, which is a transitional biome between boreal forest and prairie. The Peace River Country contains the northernmost area of aspen parkland in North America.

Bear Creek goes through the city from the northwest to the southeast and is a tributary of the Wapiti River to the south. The Bear Creek Reservoir is the small body of water by Northwestern Polytechnic in the northwest part of the city, and is ringed by marshy wetland. The terrain immediately surrounding Grande Prairie is largely flat to gently rolling, but rises gradually to hilly terrain closer to the foothills to the south and southwest. On clear days, some peaks in the Rockies are visible to the southwest from Grande Prairie.

=== Climate ===
Grande Prairie

Climate chart (precipitation, max. and min. temperature)
J	F	M	A	M	J	J	A	S	O	N	D
28 −8 −19	16 −5 −16	18 0 −12	22 10 −2	42 17 3	72 21 8	73 23 10	50 22 8	37 17 4	30 9 −2	29 −1 −11	19 −6 −17
- █ Average max. and min. temperatures in °C
- █ Precipitation totals in mm
- Source: Environment and Climate Change Canada
Imperial conversion
J	F	M	A	M	J	J	A	S	O	N	D
1.1 17 −3	0.6 24 3	0.7 32 11	0.9 50 28	1.6 63 38	2.9 69 46	2.9 73 50	2 72 47	1.5 63 39	1.2 48 28	1.1 30 13	0.8 20 1
- █ Average max. and min. temperatures in °F
- █ Precipitation totals in inches

Grande Prairie has a northern continental climate typical of northwestern Alberta and northeastern British Columbia, classified as humid continental (Dfb), bordering closely on a subarctic climate (Dfc) with old data under the Köppen climate classification. Winters are generally very cold with some mild spells. Summers are often fairly cool to pleasantly warm in the daytime, but nights can be cool despite the long summer days typical for its latitude. Hot days over 30 °C (86 °F) are rare, occurring on average only two to three days a year, which is not unexpected this far north. Winter conditions can vary tremendously from year to year. Winters have been known to be mild enough to produce brown Christmas conditions, where little or no snow may fall until after Christmas due to unusually mild early winter conditions. The average January temperature is −13.6 °C (7.5 °F), while the average July temperature is 16.2 °C (61.2 °F). However, temperatures as low as −52.2 °C (−62.0 °F) have been recorded; alongside as high as 41.5 °C (106.7 °F), which the latter occurred on June 29, 2021; the extreme humidex and wind chill readings are 40.8 and −63.0 °C (105.4 and −81.4 °F), respectively.

The city receives 445 millimetres (17.5 in) of precipitation annually, including 322 mm (12.7 in) of rain and 154 centimetres (61 in) of snow. Snowfall amounts, however, vary greatly from year to year. Being fairly close to the foothills of the Canadian Rockies, it can get quite windy in Grande Prairie, especially in the spring and fall. Chinooks may occur in and bring winter thaws to the Grande Prairie area.

Grande Prairie has 314 days with measurable sunshine per year on average, and just above 2,200 hours of bright sunshine or about 46.1% of possible sunshine, ranging from a low of 31.2% in November to a high of 59.1% in July.

Summers can bring thunderstorms, although they are not as frequent nor as severe as those further south in Central Alberta. Rainfall can vary from year to year, but the Peace Region is noted for never having experienced truly severe drought conditions more typical of Southern Alberta and neighbouring Saskatchewan. Tornadoes are rare but not unheard of in the Peace Region. A tornado struck the downtown area and east side of Grande Prairie on July 8, 2004. Although the tornado was considered a very weak one (F0-F1 on the Fujita scale) and the weather was not severe at the time, it was still strong enough to damage houses and flip vehicles. There were no casualties or deaths.

The record high daily minimum was 18.9 °C (66.0 °F) recorded May 22, 1945. The record highest dew point was 22.2 °C (72.0 °F) recorded July 31, 1971. The most humid month was August 1989 with an average dew point of 11.9 °C (53.4 °F). The warmest month was July 2024 with an average mean temperature of 19.8 °C (67.6 °F) and the highest average monthly daily minimum of 12.2 °C (54.0 °F). August 1981 recorded the highest monthly average daily maximum of 26.7 °C (80.1 °F). July 1985 set a record of no maximum temperature below 19.6 °C (67.3 °F) for the entire month; and July 2020 with no temperature below C and no dew point below 4.5 °C (40.1 °F).

The lowest yearly maximum dew point is 13.3 °C (55.9 °F) recorded in 1985. The lowest yearly maximum daily minimum temperature is 12.5 °C (54.5 °F) recorded in 2011. The lowest yearly maximum temperature is 26.1 °C (79.0 °F) recorded in 1976.

The average yearly maximum dew point is 17.4 °C (63.3 °F) and the average yearly maximum daily minimum temperature is 15.1 °C (59.2 °F).

Climate data for Grande Prairie (Grande Prairie Airport) WMO ID: 71940; coordinates 55°10′47″N 118°53′06″W; elevation: 669 m (2,195 ft); 1991−2020 normals, extremes 1922−present
Month	Jan	Feb	Mar	Apr	May	Jun	Jul	Aug	Sep	Oct	Nov	Dec	Year
Record high humidex	14.5	11.1	15.6	28.6	30.8	44.0	40.8	36.6	34.7	27.1	17.2	12.1	44.0
Record high °C (°F)	15.2 (59.4)	12.8 (55.0)	16.1 (61.0)	29.4 (84.9)	34.4 (93.9)	41.1 (106.0)	35.6 (96.1)	34.5 (94.1)	31.9 (89.4)	28.9 (84.0)	22.2 (72.0)	13.3 (55.9)	41.1 (106.0)
Mean maximum °C (°F)	7.0 (44.6)	6.6 (43.9)	9.6 (49.3)	19.9 (67.8)	26.4 (79.5)	27.7 (81.9)	29.8 (85.6)	29.5 (85.1)	26.5 (79.7)	20.5 (68.9)	9.9 (49.8)	6.1 (43.0)	31.2 (88.2)
Mean daily maximum °C (°F)	−8.3 (17.1)	−4.6 (23.7)	−0.1 (31.8)	9.9 (49.8)	17.0 (62.6)	20.6 (69.1)	22.7 (72.9)	22.0 (71.6)	17.3 (63.1)	9.1 (48.4)	−0.9 (30.4)	−6.4 (20.5)	8.2 (46.8)
Daily mean °C (°F)	−13.9 (7.0)	−10.5 (13.1)	−5.8 (21.6)	3.8 (38.8)	10.3 (50.5)	14.3 (57.7)	16.3 (61.3)	15.2 (59.4)	10.5 (50.9)	3.3 (37.9)	−5.9 (21.4)	−11.7 (10.9)	2.2 (35.9)
Mean daily minimum °C (°F)	−19.4 (−2.9)	−16.3 (2.7)	−11.5 (11.3)	−2.3 (27.9)	3.4 (38.1)	8.0 (46.4)	9.9 (49.8)	8.4 (47.1)	3.8 (38.8)	−2.4 (27.7)	−10.7 (12.7)	−17.0 (1.4)	−3.8 (25.1)
Mean minimum °C (°F)	−36.5 (−33.7)	−30.9 (−23.6)	−27.9 (−18.2)	−12.5 (9.5)	−3.8 (25.2)	2.3 (36.1)	4.6 (40.3)	2.0 (35.6)	−3.9 (25.0)	−12.2 (10.0)	−24.7 (−12.5)	−31.3 (−24.3)	−40.2 (−40.4)
Record low °C (°F)	−52.2 (−62.0)	−50.0 (−58.0)	−42.8 (−45.0)	−35.6 (−32.1)	−8.7 (16.3)	−3.3 (26.1)	−1.1 (30.0)	−2.8 (27.0)	−11.7 (10.9)	−31.7 (−25.1)	−40.6 (−41.1)	−47.2 (−53.0)	−52.2 (−62.0)
Record low wind chill	−63.0	−55.0	−53.1	−46.7	−16.1	−4.3	0.0	−3.2	−15.3	−34.3	−56.1	−56.3	−63.0
Average precipitation mm (inches)	28.4 (1.12)	15.5 (0.61)	17.6 (0.69)	21.7 (0.85)	41.6 (1.64)	72.4 (2.85)	72.9 (2.87)	49.9 (1.96)	37.2 (1.46)	30.2 (1.19)	28.6 (1.13)	19.1 (0.75)	435.3 (17.14)
Average rainfall mm (inches)	2.4 (0.09)	0.8 (0.03)	1.7 (0.07)	12.2 (0.48)	37.8 (1.49)	71.6 (2.82)	73.1 (2.88)	49.9 (1.96)	35.7 (1.41)	17.8 (0.70)	7.1 (0.28)	0.8 (0.03)	310.8 (12.24)
Average snowfall cm (inches)	34.3 (13.5)	20.4 (8.0)	21.6 (8.5)	11.2 (4.4)	5.0 (2.0)	0.2 (0.1)	0.0 (0.0)	0.0 (0.0)	1.6 (0.6)	14.8 (5.8)	27.8 (10.9)	25.3 (10.0)	162.2 (63.9)
Average precipitation days (≥ 0.2 mm)	12.6	7.7	9.3	8.2	10.8	13.5	14.0	11.2	11.5	11.0	11.8	9.8	131.4
Average rainy days (≥ 0.2 mm)	2.2	0.8	1.9	5.5	10.3	13.4	14.2	11.2	11.4	7.7	3.9	1.0	83.5
Average snowy days (≥ 0.2 cm)	11.5	7.6	8.0	3.7	1.3	0.04	0.0	0.0	0.56	4.3	9.2	9.6	55.8
Average relative humidity (%) (at 1500 LST)	72.9	68.8	61.7	45.9	39.6	45.9	48.8	48.0	49.7	56.5	73.0	74.3	57.1
Average dew point °C (°F)	−16.6 (2.1)	−14.2 (6.4)	−10.3 (13.5)	−3.9 (25.0)	0.8 (33.4)	6.4 (43.5)	9.4 (48.9)	8.5 (47.3)	4.2 (39.6)	−1.8 (28.8)	−9.2 (15.4)	−15.0 (5.0)	−3.5 (25.7)
Mean monthly sunshine hours	77.8	106.2	172.1	231.0	276.0	295.2	307.7	272.4	172.5	134.5	78.9	73.5	2,197.7
Percentage possible sunshine	32.1	39.1	47.0	54.6	55.1	56.9	59.1	58.7	45.0	41.3	31.2	32.7	46.1
Source: Environment and Climate Change Canada (1991–2020) (sun 1981–2010) (June max) (mean maximum / minimum, & dew point from weatherstats.ca)

== Demographics ==
Federal census population history
Year	Pop.	±%
1916	337	—
1921	1,061	+214.8%
1926	917	−13.6%
1931	1,464	+59.7%
1936	1,478	+1.0%
1941	1,724	+16.6%
1946	2,267	+31.5%
1951	2,664	+17.5%
1956	6,302	+136.6%
1961	8,352	+32.5%
1966	11,417	+36.7%
1971	13,079	+14.6%
1976	17,626	+34.8%
1981	24,263	+37.7%
1986	26,471	+9.1%
1991	28,271	+6.8%
1996	31,140	+10.1%
2001	36,983	+18.8%
2006	47,076	+27.3%
2011	55,032	+16.9%
2016	63,166	+14.8%
2021	64,141	+1.5%
Source: Statistics Canada

In the 2021 Census of Population conducted by Statistics Canada, the City of Grande Prairie had a population of 64,141 living in 24,816 of its 27,551 total private dwellings, a change of 1.5% from its 2016 population of 63,166. With a land area of 132.71 square kilometres (51.24 sq mi), it had a population density of 483.3/km^{2} (1,251.8/sq mi) in 2021.

In the 2016 Census of Population conducted by Statistics Canada, the City of Grande Prairie had a population of 63,166 living in 23,676 of its 26,204 total private dwellings, a change of 13.5% from its 2011 population of 55,655. With a land area of 132.73 km^{2} (51.25 sq mi), it had a population density of 475.9/km^{2} (1,232.6/sq mi) in 2016.

The population of the City of Grande Prairie according to its 2015 municipal census was 68,556, a change of 36.5% from its 2007 municipal census population of 50,227.

In the 2021 census, 15.9% of residents were visible minorities, while 11.7% were Indigenous and the remaining 72.4% were white/European. The largest visible minority groups were Filipino (6.9%), South Asian (2.9%), Black (2.2%), Latin American (0.8%), Chinese (0.8%) and Arab (0.6%).

Panethnic groups in the City of Grande Prairie (2001−2021)
Panethnic group	2021		2016		2011		2006		2001	
Panethnic group	Pop.	%	Pop.	%	Pop.	%	Pop.	%	Pop.	%
European (Note: Statistic includes all persons that did not make up part of a visible minority or an indigenous identity.)	45,770	72.45%	48,145	77.58%	45,685	84%	40,090	85.74%	32,325	88.48%
Indigenous	7,370	11.67%	6,550	10.56%	5,290	9.73%	4,365	9.34%	2,610	7.14%
Southeast Asian (Note: Statistic includes total responses of Filipino and Southeast Asian under visible minority section on census.)	4,620	7.31%	3,210	5.17%	1,275	2.34%	600	1.28%	265	0.73%
South Asian	1,820	2.88%	1,165	1.88%	590	1.08%	460	0.98%	475	1.3%
African	1,415	2.24%	1,325	2.14%	410	0.75%	325	0.7%	195	0.53%
East Asian (Note: Statistic includes total responses of Chinese, Korean, and Japanese under visible minority section on census.)	790	1.25%	665	1.07%	685	1.26%	490	1.05%	315	0.86%
Latin American	530	0.84%	390	0.63%	250	0.46%	195	0.42%	200	0.55%
Middle Eastern (Note: Statistic includes total responses of West Asian and Arab under visible minority section on census.)	490	0.78%	365	0.59%	115	0.21%	75	0.16%	90	0.25%
Other/multiracial (Note: Statistic includes total responses of Visible minority, n.i.e. and Multiple visible minorities under visible minority section on census.)	360	0.57%	250	0.4%	90	0.17%	160	0.34%	60	0.16%
Total responses	63,175	98.49%	62,055	98.24%	54,390	97.73%	46,755	99.32%	36,535	98.79%
Total population	64,141	100%	63,166	100%	55,655	100%	47,076	100%	36,983	100%
Note: Totals greater than 100% due to multiple origin responses

=== Language ===
As of 2021, 83.8% of residents claimed English as their first language. Other common mother tongues were Tagalog (3.4%), French (2.1%), Punjabi (0.8%), Spanish (0.8%), and German (0.6%) . 2.0% listed both English and a non-official language as mother tongues, while 0.6% listed both English and French.

=== Religion ===
45.8% of residents were Christian in 2021, down from 58.5% in 2011. 20.4% were Catholic, 11.3% were Christian n.o.s, 10.0% were Protestant, and 4.1% belonged to other Christian denominations or Christian-related traditions. 49.4% were non-religious or secular, up from 39.2% in 2011. All other religions and spiritual traditions accounted for 4.8% of the population, up from 2.3% in 2011. The largest non-Christian religions were Islam (1.7%), Hinduism (1.1%) and Sikhism (0.8%).

=== Crime rate ===
Until 2015, Grande Prairie topped the list for the national average for the Crime Severity Index, but by 2016 a report published by Maclean's, stated that the city had dropped to 12th place.

The Crime Severity Index was 150 per 100,000 people, compared to the national average of 70.96. Grande Prairie was 13th on the Violent Crime Severity Index with 139 per 100,000 people versus a 75.25 average for all municipalities included in the report.

== Economy ==
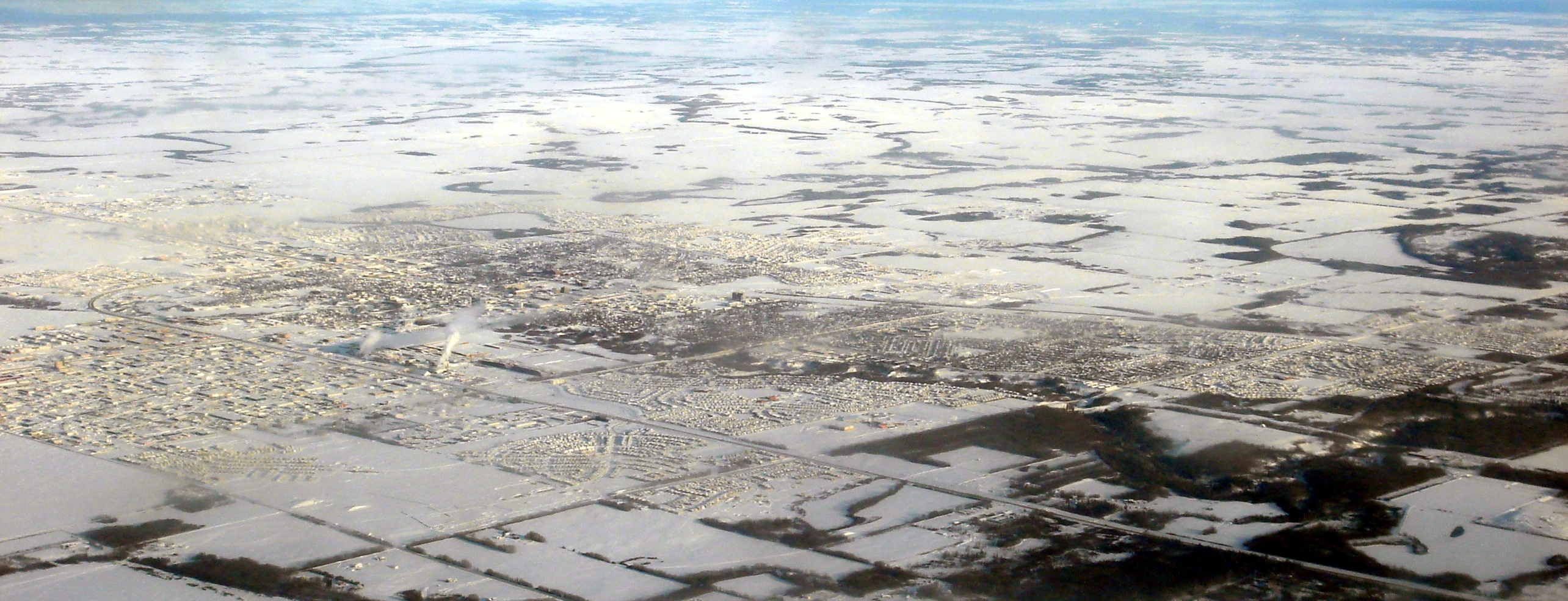
Aerial view of Grande Prairie and farmland to the north

Grande Prairie possesses a diversified economy. Major industries include oil and gas, agriculture, forestry, and food services.

Agriculture was the first economic mainstay of Grande Prairie since settlement began in the early 20th century. It remains part of the local economy today. A variety of crops such as barley, wheat, canola, and oats are grown in the area. Livestock such as cattle and buffalo (bison) are also raised in the area. Despite being north of the 55th parallel, the climate is mild enough to allow for farming on a large scale to prosper. Longer daylight hours during the summer at this latitude aid in crop production. The Peace Country is the northernmost major farming region in North America. Land within the region is still being cleared for new farmland.

Although some oil and gas drilling has been ongoing in the area since the 1950s, oil and gas exploration did not begin to occur on a large scale until the late 1970s. It was in the mid to late-1970s that the Elmworth gas field was discovered and developed, causing the city to grow rapidly until the oil boom ended in 1981. Today Grande Prairie's location atop both the Montney and Duvernay geological formations have seen local extraction activities focused on natural-gas condensate and shale gas. As a result of this focus the region has maintained relatively high levels of activity when compared to areas where conventional resources, shallow gas or heavy oil are the primary resources.

Forestry is a major part of Grande Prairie's economy, for large tracts of forest lie to the south in the foothills of the Canadian Rockies. International Paper (formerly Weyerhaeuser Canada) kraft pulp mill, opened in 1972 by Procter & Gamble, is one of Grande Prairie's largest employers. Canfor runs a sawmill and lumber yard operation on the west side of the city. Norbord (formerly Ainsworth) oriented strand board plant opened in late 1995.

Grande Prairie serves as the economic and transportation hub for a trading area of nearly 290,000 people. Grande Prairie is also on the CANAMEX trade route linking Canada, the United States, and Mexico.

== Government and politics ==
The Grande Prairie provincial district was formed in 1930. Beginning in 1993 the Grande Prairie-Wapiti and Grande Prairie-Smoky districts were formed. In 2017 the Grande Prairie-Smoky electoral district was abolished.

=== Grande Prairie Police Service ===
Grande Prairie

Agency overview
- Formed: 2023

Jurisdictional structure
- Legal jurisdiction: Municipal

Operational structure
- Sworn members: 23
- Agency executive: Dwayne Lakusta, chief of police

Website
- Official website

The Grande Prairie Police Service (GPPS) was formed on March 7, 2023. This marked the first municipal police service to be formed in Alberta in almost 70 years.

The GPPS said in May 2025 that 50 officers had been recruited since being formed in 2023, and the service's goal was to reach 110.

On October 21, 2026, the GPPS formally took over policing in the city from the RCMP.

== Arts and culture ==
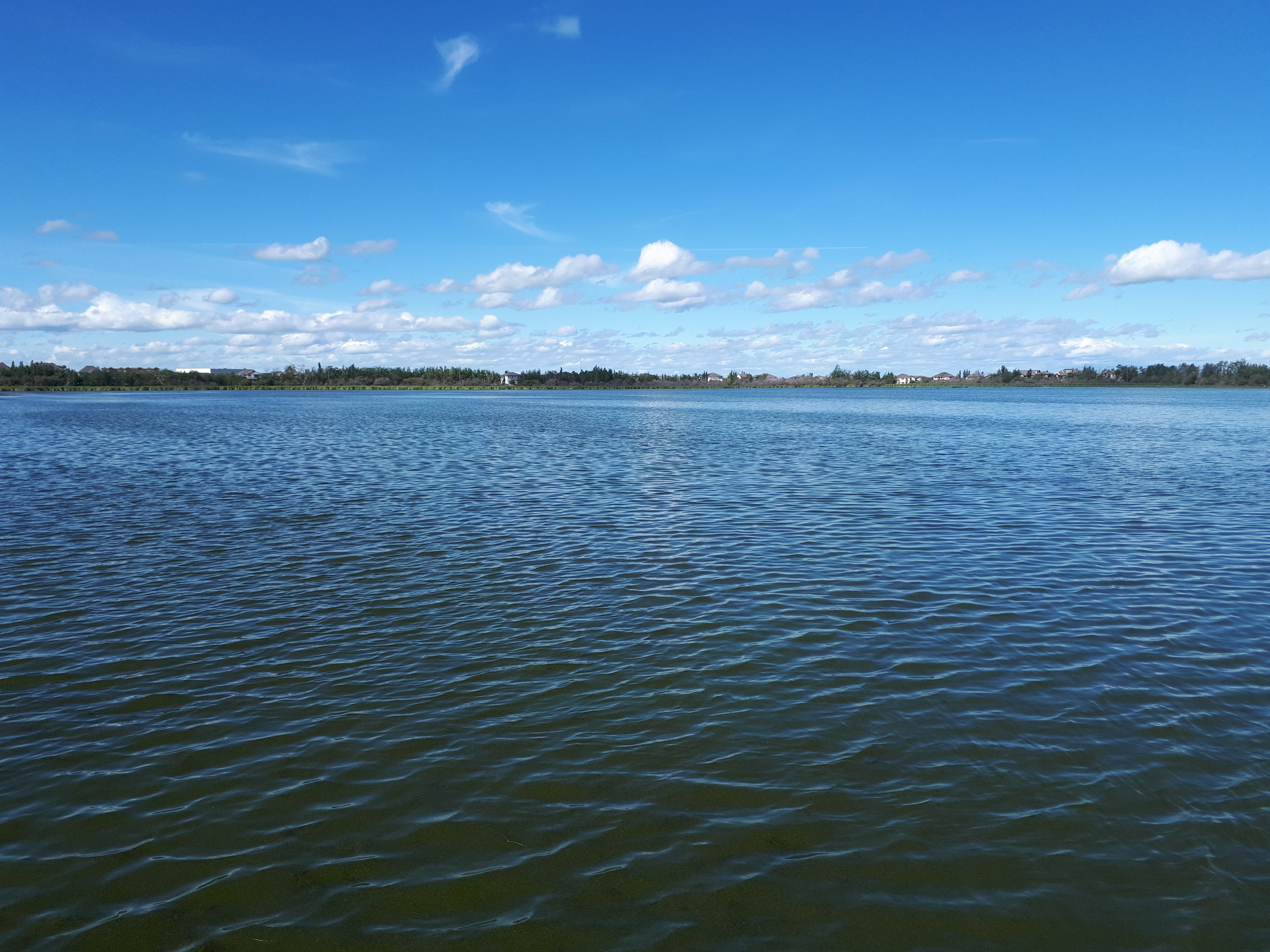
Crystal Lake, in northeast Grande Prairie

Live music can be found in several downtown bars and intermittently at all-ages locations such as Tito's Restaurant and the GP Curling Club. Summer-long music festivals have been organized by community-minded individuals and charitable organizations. Grande Prairie has a wide range of local music genres, including country (such as Tenille Townes, Brad Sims, and more); reggae (Tasman Jude); metal (Arrival of Autumn); folk; rock, and more

Cultural venues include Bonnetts Energy Centre (a concert hall and hockey rink—the local AJHL team, the Grande Prairie Storm, plays there), the Grande Prairie Museum, the Art Gallery of Grande Prairie, 214 place, the tallest commercial building in the city, and Second Street Theatre. Grande Prairie is also home to a professional musical theatre company, "Broadway Live Broadway". The Grand Prairie Public Library, founded in 1939, includes broad collections of medical, travel, fiction, and children's literature.

The Reel Shorts Film Festival is a five-day international festival of short films that takes place at Grande Prairie Live Theatre's Second Street Theatre in early May.

The Philip J. Currie Dinosaur Museum, located fifteen minutes west of Grande Prairie, is a 3,800 m^{2} (41,000 sq ft) building with many exhibits, a large theatre, classrooms, a paleontology lab, a gift shop, and a restaurant. The museum is named after Philip J. Currie, from the University of Alberta, who has contributed to the understanding of the link between dinosaurs and birds.

The Bear Creek Folk Music Festival, first held in 2016, is an outdoor music festival held in late August on Borstad Hill in Muskoseepi Park. The festival is funded in part by the City of Grande Prairie.

== Sports and recreation ==
In 1995, the city hosted the Canada Games. The event was televised nationally on CBC Television. Hundreds of athletes competed in the events and the city gained status and recognition as a result. The city played host to the 2010 Arctic Winter Games from March 6–13, 2010.

There are a number of parks in Grande Prairie, including the large Muskoseepi Park in the Bear Creek valley which winds its way throughout the city. Muskoseepi Park has excellent walking and bike trails extending nearly the entire length of Bear Creek, from the northwest to the southeast of the city. The park also contains the Ernie Radbourne Pavilion, the outdoor Bear Creek Swimming Pool and the outdoor Muskoseepi Park Pond which converts into a skating rink in the winter.

Crystal Lake in the northeast part of the city also has parkland, preserved wetlands (great for birdwatching), and walking/bike paths around its entire circumference.

Nestled within spruce and pine trees, on the south east side of the city, just a couple of minutes from downtown, is Evergreen Park. The park and facilities are home to the annual Grande Prairie Stompede event, which draws upwards of 30,000 people annually. The park is the largest full featured exhibition facility north of Edmonton, and can cater to upwards of 10,000 people at a time. It has a restaurant (open daily) and a lounge, and hosts events such as agricultural shows, rodeos, chuckwagon races, horse racing, sportsman and RV shows. A variety of halls, convention spaces and conference facilities all with paved parking are available. The largest building, the Entrec Centre has 9,800 m^{2} (105,000 sq ft) of space, with a 4,300 m^{2} (46,000 sq ft) main hall, and has hosted many concerts and trade shows in the past. Evergreen Park also has a 76 spot RV and Marine Campground which is open in the summer from May to October, as well as an archery centre, an equestrian facility, and 12 baseball diamonds, which are home to the Grande Prairie Reds Baseball Club.

Grande Prairie has three 18-hole golf courses, The Dunes Golf and Winter Club, the Bear Creek Golf Club, and the Grande Prairie Golf and Country Club. A fourth golf course, Grovedale Golf Course, is also located approximately 20 km (12 mi) to the southwest of the city.

Early in 2017, a new nine hole course, The Bear Paw Golf Course, with a par level of 3 opened up in the South Bear Creek Recreation Area.

Grande Prairie has three 18-hole disc golf courses. Thrill Hill in the Swanavon neighbourhood, South Bear Creek, and Coop Community Course at Evergreen Park, which was the site of the 2026 Canadian National Disc Golf Championships.

Downhill skiing is popular in Grande Prairie, which has a local ski hill called Nitehawk and is located south of the city on the south bank of the Wapiti River. Aside from skiing, Nitehawk also has the only North American natural luge track certified for international events, and over the summer months freestyle ski jumpers practice using the Northern Extreme water ramp facility. It is also active in luge as a naturally refrigerated venue, hosting the FIL World Luge Natural Track Championships in 2007.

Cross-country skiing is also common during the winter. The Wapiti Nordic Ski Club is one of Canada's premier cross country skiing and biathlon facilities, and is just south of the city. There are over 35 km (22 mi) of both classical and skate skiing trails, as well as 4.5 km (2.8 mi) of nightly lit trails. There are also snowshoe trails as well as dog friendly trails. In the summer, the trails are used for hiking, mountain biking, and running.

The foothills south of Grande Prairie and around Grande Cache are visited year-round for hiking in the summer and for snowmobiling and other winter sports in the winter. Kakwa Wildland Park on the Alberta–BC border, about 180 km (110 mi) south of the city, is a mountainous natural area and is known for the Kakwa Falls.

On the South side of the city, off of Resources Road, is the Wapiti Shooters Club. The club was founded in 1949, and due to the many upgrades over the years is considered one of the finest shooting clubs in Alberta. It offers Shotgun (Trap, Sporting Clays, and Skeet), Handgun (outdoor 12 lanes, indoor 6 lanes), and a 200 m (660 ft) outdoor covered rifle range. The club is also used for business functions, birthday parties, RCMP, Sheriff, and Safety training. Over the years many top level coaches and athletes from all over Canada have trained or entered into events at the club. In addition, the club is currently developing a 1,000-metre-long (3,300 ft) rifle range suitable for high power rifles, north of the city, near Webster. There is also an indoor shooting range (Bullets and Broadheads) across the street from (west of) the Prairie Mall.

Grande Prairie also has a new and modern 42,000 m^{2} (450,000 sq ft) health and fitness facility known as the Eastlink Centre. It is a large indoor fitness facility that has two indoor pools: a 50-meter, deep water Olympic sized pool, and a 25-meter, wheelchair accessible, higher temperature, shallow water Program Pool. Other aquatic amenities include a splash park, a lazy river, waterslides, and a surf simulator. The facility also includes a large weight room, squash and racquetball courts, fitness classes, a daycare service, a multi-use basketball court, a summer outdoor 5,000 sq. ft. concrete skateboard park, and additional other amenities and programs. The Eastlink Centre is located in the city's southwest and connects St. Joseph High School, the Grande Prairie Gymnastics Centre, the Design Works Centre, and Charles Spencer High School. In March 2012 the Eastlink Centre received an award for its exceptional accessibility features.

The Outdoor Bear Creek (Aquatera) Swimming Pool, in Muskoseepi Park, was reopened in the summer of 2019, after extensive modifications. The new renovations include a Tots Pool, a Zero Beach, Spanish Steps, Lily Islands, a Games Area, and a Waterslide.

The Leisure Centre (previously known as the Rec-Plex) is located in northwest Grande Prairie near the Bear Creek Reservoir. In December 2011, after the Eastlink Centre opened, the majority of the Leisure Centre was closed, with unrealized plans to reopen in the second half of 2013. Currently the swimming pool and gym remain closed, but the indoor soccer pitch is open for a variety of sports.

Over the years Grande Prairie has played host to many tournaments including:

- 2004 Royal Bank Cup
- 2006 Ford World Women's Curling Championship
- 2009 Players' Championship
- 2010 Arctic Winter Games
- 2011 Players' Championship
- 2012 Pomeroy Inn & Suites Prairie Showdown (Pomeroy Inn & Suites Prairie Showdown)
- 2013 Pomeroy Inn & Suites Prairie Showdown
- 2015 Canada Cup of Curling
- 2016 Scotties Tournament of Hearts

The city also has the following ice hockey teams:

Club	League	Sport	Venue	Established	Championships
Grande Prairie Storm	AJHL	Ice hockey	Revolution Place	1966	3
Grande Prairie Kings	NWJHL	Ice hockey	Crosslink County Sportsplex	1994	1
Grande Prairie Athletics	NPHL	Ice hockey	Crosslink County Sportsplex	1960	7

== Transportation ==
=== Air ===
The Grande Prairie Airport is located at the west end of the city and serves the region with daily scheduled flights to Calgary and Edmonton. Two airlines, Air Canada and WestJet, offer service to the airport. The airport saw a reduction in flights in 2023. The Grande Prairie Airport was originally developed in the 1930s as a grass only strip at its present site. In 1941 in support of the war effort, and the building of the Alaska Highway, the facility was expanded for utilization by the Royal Canadian Air Force and the United States Air Force. In 1950, the airport came under the authority of the Federal Government until February 1, 1997, when it was transferred to the City of Grande Prairie.

The terminal, built in 1981, was renovated in 2009 making it twice its original size. In 2014, one of the two asphalt runways was extended to 8,502 feet (2,591 m), with the other one being 6,200 ft (1,900 m). A forthcoming expansion includes an upgrade to the parking system. Currently the airport has no customs capabilities (although a temporary customs facility was set up for the 2010 Arctic Winter Games).

Swanberg Air formerly operated out of the airport until they ceased operations in 2011. They flew cargo, scheduled, and charter passenger services in Alberta, Saskatchewan, and British Columbia.

=== City public transit ===
Grande Prairie Transit is a small public transit system with modern buses and a route system integrated throughout the city. In September 2023, city transit became free to anyone under the age of 18 years.

Grande Prairie's local vehicle-for-hire industry has been historically anchored by long-standing family-run providers. While the market has expanded to include various independent owner-operators and services regulated under City Bylaw C-1394, these original companies remain the city's longest-standing managed taxi fleets serving the Grande Prairie, Clairmont, and Sexsmith areas. Both providers offer 24/7 service, including regional long-distance transfers to out-of-town areas across Alberta. Yellow Cab GP serves as the official, 24/7 ground transportation provider for the Grande Prairie Airport, with dedicated staging at the terminal's arrival doors.

=== Intercity bus ===
Greyhound Canada offered scheduled bus service from its Grande Prairie terminal to Edmonton and Dawson Creek. This service was terminated in October 2018. Ebus connects Grande Prairie to Edmonton. Bus service to Edmonton is also provided by Cold Shot Bus Service.

=== Highways and roads ===
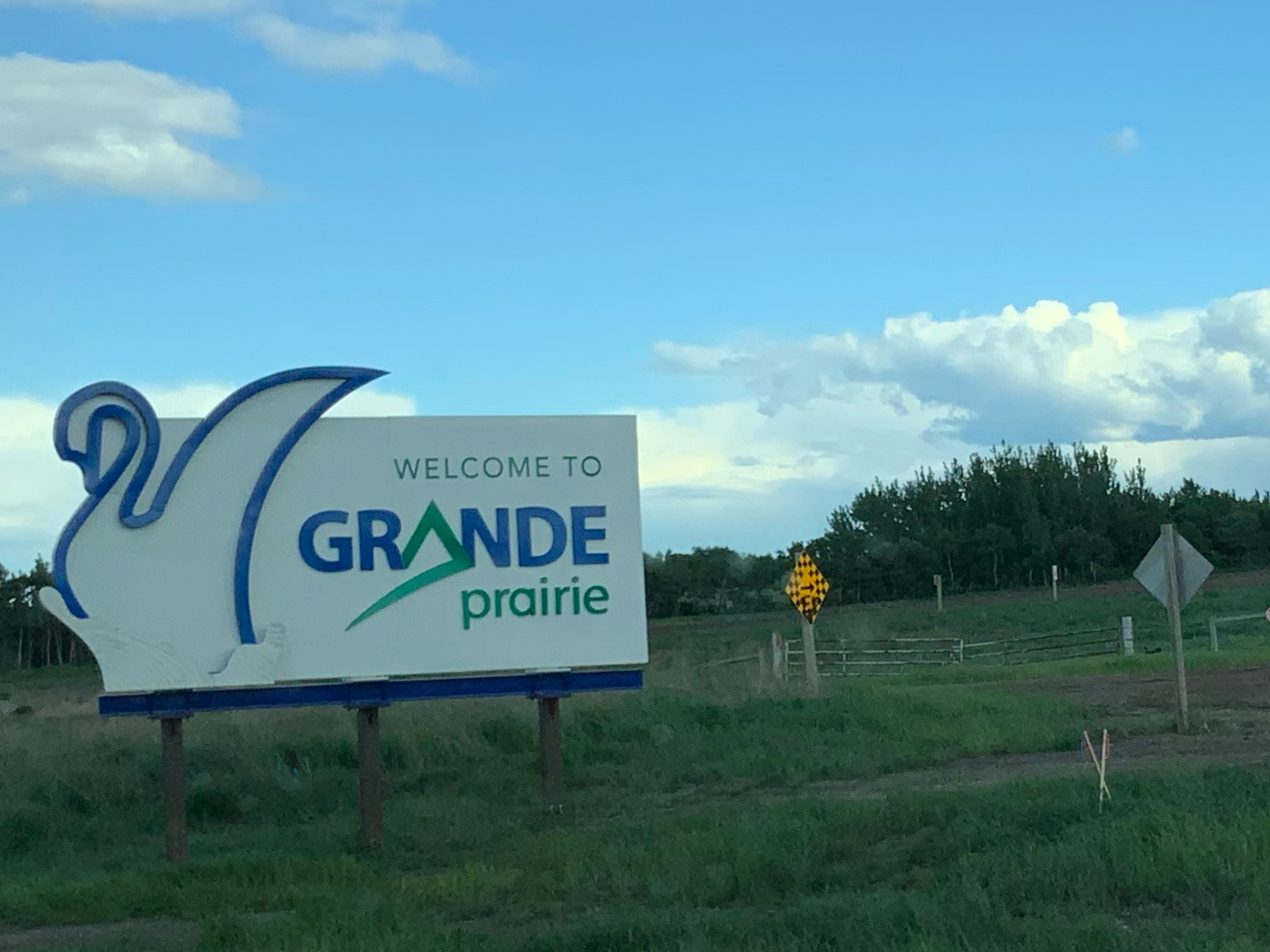
The welcome sign of the city of Grande Prairie.

Highway 43 is the main east–west highway through the city providing a connection from Edmonton to the southeast through to British Columbia to the west. Highway 43 meets Highway 2 a few kilometres north of the city at the Four Mile Interchange, then continues south into the city, via the city bypass, and exits the city at the west end near the airport. The Four Mile Interchange (previously called Four Mile Corner) is an interchange so-named because it is six kilometres (four miles) north of Richmond Avenue (100th Avenue, at 100 street).

The short stretch of Highway 2 extending just north and just west of Grande Prairie was renumbered to Highway 43 in the late 1990s to link with the rest of Highway 43 i.e.: the Yellowhead Highway from Edmonton. The renumbering was also due to Highway 43 now being a part of the CANAMEX trade route and being widened to a four-lane divided highway.

The four lane Highway 43X bypass, skirts the northwest corner of the city from the Four Mile Interchange to Highway 43 just west of the airport. The Highway 43X bypass was completed in stages, over several years, and was fully opened to traffic in September 2019. The Highway 43X Bypass permits traffic to go around the city's north west region, and reduces traffic on the city bypass, which was built in the 1960s, and had become fully engulfed within the city, and was somewhat congested with traffic.

Highway 40 is the primary access road into Grande Prairie from the south, and extends southward to Grande Cache, and onward to Jasper National Park. It is part of the shortest fully paved route to Alaska from the lower 48 states, so Grande Prairie sees many vacationers heading to Alaska by road during the summer via Highway 40 northward into Grande Prairie, then Highway 43 westward towards Dawson Creek, BC, which is Mile 0 of the Alaska Highway.

=== Rail ===
The City of Grande Prairie has rail freight service provided by CN. Trackage runs south from Grande Prairie to Grande Cache and Hinton, where it joins CN's main transcontinental line. CN also operates local freight service out of Grande Prairie on former Northern Alberta Railways tracks - north to Sexsmith and Rycroft, and west to Beaverlodge and Hythe.

Savage Alberta Railway, which operated from 1999 to 2006, was owned by North American RailNet and had its headquarters in the city prior to being purchased by CN.

== Education ==
=== Elementary and secondary schools ===
Four school districts operate schools within Grande Prairie.

The Grande Prairie Public School District (GPPSD) operates 18 schools.

Grande Prairie Roman Catholic Separate School District No. 28 operates 11 schools within Grande Prairie.

The Peace Wapiti School Division No. 76 (PWSD) operates three schools in Grande Prairie that serve students of the surrounding County of Grande Prairie No. 1.

The Northwest Francophone Education Region No. 1 operates École Nouvelle Frontière for students in kindergarten to grade 12.

Aside from the two outreach schools that provide alternative curriculum for high school students, Grande Prairie's high schools are the Grande Prairie Composite High School (GPPSD), St. Joseph's Catholic High School (GP&DCS), Ecole Nouvelle Frontiere, Charles Spencer High School (GPPSD) Peace Wapiti Academy (PWSD), and St John Paul II (GPCSD).

=== Post-secondary ===
Northwestern Polytechnic (NWP), previously known as Grande Prairie Regional College, was originally incorporated as the Grande Prairie Junior College in 1965 and opened its doors in 1966. After being renamed Grande Prairie Regional College (GPRC) in 1970, construction of the present campus began in 1973, based on a plan prepared by Canadian architect Douglas Cardinal. The first phase opened in 1974 followed by the second phase in 1991. GPRC was renamed Northwestern Polytechnic in March 2022.

Dr. Vanessa Sheane was appointed acting president and CEO in July 2023.

== Notable people ==
- Theodore deWit Willie deWit, former professional and Olympic boxer
- Tanner Fritz, professional ice hockey player for the New York Islanders of the NHL
- Leslie Greentree, poet
- Carolyn Dawn Johnson, country music singer-songwriter
- Dusty LaValley, bareback rider
- Kelly Sutherland (chuckwagon) retired professional chuckwagon driver
- Viktor (Eric Thompson), professional wrestler
- Tenille Townes, country music singer
- Chris Warkentin, Canadian politician, Conservative Member of Parliament (2006-)
- William Paul Young, novelist
- Alex Zahara, actor

== See also ==
- List of francophone communities in Alberta
