= Guy Weadick =

American cowboy

- Born: George Guy Weadick; February 23, 1885; Rochester, New York, U.S.
- Died: December 13, 1953 (aged 68); Los Angeles, California, U.S.
- Occupation: Cowboy
- Known for: Co-founder of Calgary Stampede
- Spouses: Grace Maud Bensel (m. 1906; died 1951) Dorothy Mullens (m. 1952)

George Guy Weadick (February 23, 1885 – December 13, 1953) was an American cowboy, performer and promoter. He and his horse Cyclone quickly became well known in the Calgary area. Today, he is best known as the founder of the Calgary Stampede in Alberta, Canada. He was married to famed cowgirl, Florence LaDue. Weadick was the first to be inducted in the Builder category in the Canadian Pro Rodeo Hall of Fame.

== Calgary Stampede ==
In 1912, Weadick travelled to Calgary, where he met with H.C. McMullen, a livestock agent for the Canadian Pacific Railway. The two of them put together a program for a frontier show. They envisioned a cowboy championship along with a tribute to the Old West. Weadick gained financing from the Big Four: George Lane, owner of the Bar U Ranch; two other wealthy ranchers, Patrick Burns and A. E. Cross; and A. J. McLean, provincial secretary. He staged the first Calgary Stampede September 2–7, 1912, when ranchers and farmers had finished the harvesting and would be free to attend.

Weadick arranged for 200 head of Mexican steers, 200 bucking steers, and wild horses to be brought in from the ranches around Calgary. In order to entice top quality competitors, $20,000 in championship money and world championship titles were offered. The prize money was about four times the closest competition, causing riders from across North America to arrive in the 1912 Stampede. In 1919, Weadick and Calgary Industrial Exhibition manager, E. L. Richardson, agreed to combine the rodeo events with the Calgary Industrial Exhibition and, in 1923, Weadick and Richardson co-founded the Calgary Exhibition and Stampede as an annual event.

In 1912, Indigenous peoples were not allowed to celebrate their cultures on their own reserves because of Indian Act laws and regulations. The Stampede was one of the only places they were welcomed to participate and celebrate their traditions publicly because of a special agreement Guy Weadick and the Calgary Stampede made with the government. Indian Village is organized by volunteers on the Stampede's Indian Events committee, Stampede employees and the tipi families who camp at the Village during the Stampede. There is constant consultation about the name of the Village and if it should be changed. The tipi owners have indicated that Indian Village is a place and a name with great historical significance and honours the role of Guy Weadick and the relationship with the Stampede throughout the 20th century.

== Later years ==
Following on the success of the Calgary Stampede, Guy Weadick continued promoting his own personal Old West shows (outside Calgary). He continued running the Stampede for 20 years after its initial creation. His next appearance at the Stampede was to appear in the parade in 1952. He died on December 13, 1953. The Calgary Stampede Guy Weadick Award, created in 1969, was named after him. He was inducted into the Canadian Pro Rodeo Hall of Fame in the Builder category on July 12, 1982. He was inducted into the Rodeo Hall of Fame of the National Cowboy & Western Heritage Museum in 1976.
