= Chuckwagon racing =

Equestrian rodeo sport

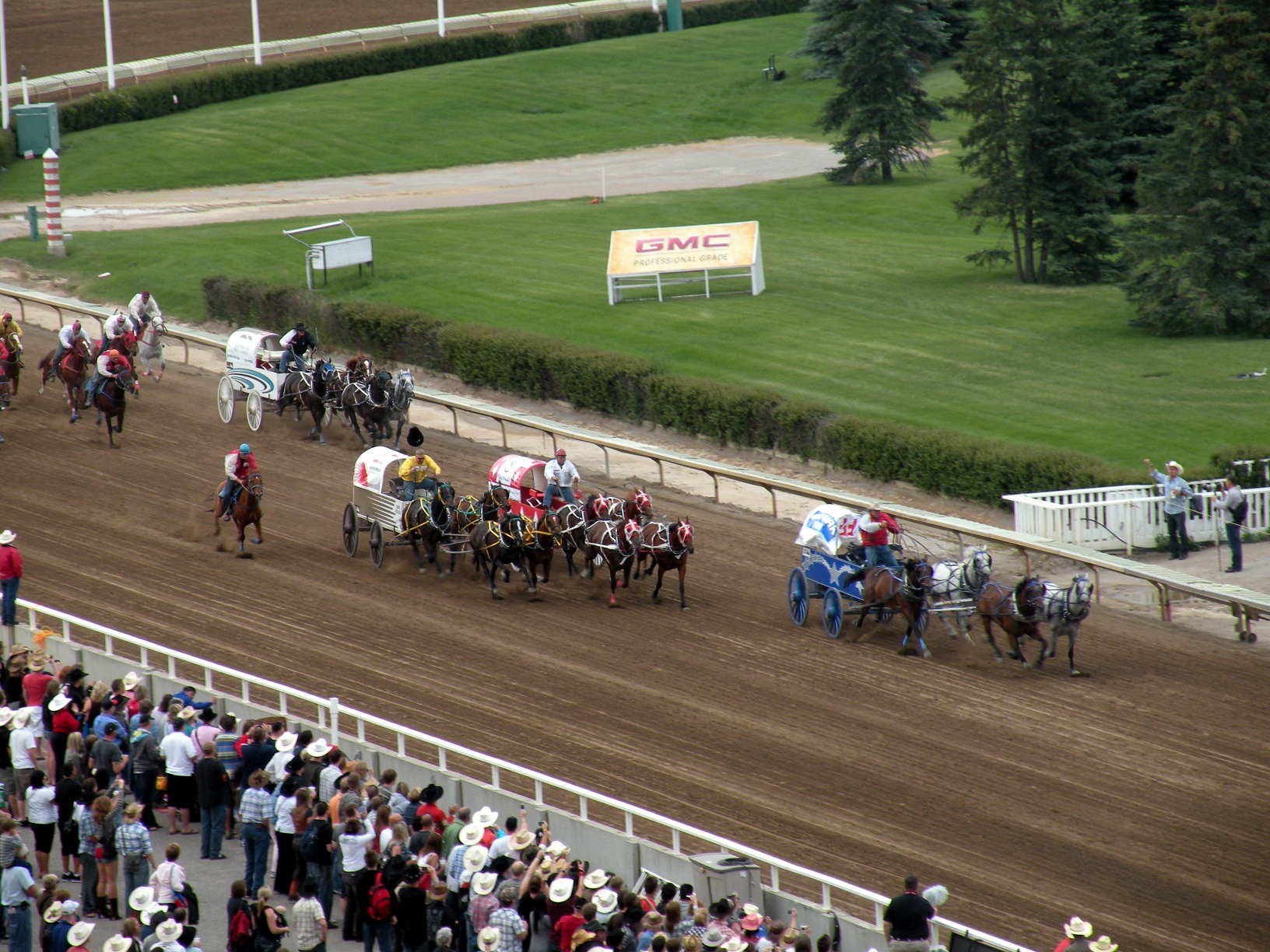
- Chuckwagons racing toward the finish line at the 2009 Calgary Stampede

Characteristics
- Type: Equestrian rodeo sport

Presence
- Olympic: No
- Paralympic: No
- World Games: No

Chuckwagon racing is an equestrian rodeo sport in which drivers in a chuckwagon led by a team of Thoroughbred horses race around a track.

The sport is most popular in Alberta and Saskatchewan, where the World Professional Chuckwagon Association and the Canadian Professional Chuckwagon Association are the two major racing circuits. The most famous chuckwagon race in the world is held the "Half-Mile of Hell" annually at the Calgary Stampede, where the total prize money for the ten-day event tops C$2 million ($1.5 million USD). The WPCA submits 25 drivers to the Calgary Stampede, while the CPCA submits 11 drivers. The sport is controversial with animal rights groups, as horses and drivers have been injured or died, prompting some to call for it to be banned.

In 1986, adapted versions of the sport were adopted in Central Arkansas, and have evolved into a semi-popular spectator sport in the Midwest and MidSouth, USA. The National Championship Chuckwagon Races are held over Labor Day Weekend in Clinton, Arkansas on The ōf Ranch, owned by Dan and Peggy Eoff. The event is widely regarded as one of the largest equine events in the USA. With over 6,000 horses and mules on the ranch throughout the weekend, and over 20,000 campers and spectators, the National Championships have grown into a yearly tradition and celebration of old Western culture. The Arkansas format of wagon racing has branched out into The Arkansas Chuckwagon Racing Association, which sanctions over a half-dozen weekend racing events across Arkansas, Missouri, Kentucky, Tennessee, and Alabama. Races are captured and broadcast through The Chuckwagon Channel.

== Race format ==
Each chuckwagon racing team is led by a driver, who commands a team of horses pulling the chuckwagon. The driver is supported by two or four outriders, each racing individual thoroughbred horses that follow the chuckwagon. Each race typically involves three or four teams, and begins with the outriders "breaking camp", by tossing two tent poles (with four outriders only) and a barrel representing a camp stove into the back of their wagon before mounting their horses and following the wagons as they complete a figure eight around two barrels before circling a race track. The first wagon to cross the finish line typically wins, although various time penalties are handed out for infractions such as a barrel being knocked over, a tent pole or stove not loaded, wagon interference, or an outrider crossing the finish line too far behind his wagon driver.

== History ==
The first time chuckwagon races were held as a spectator sport was at the 1923 Calgary Stampede. Guy Weadick, who had founded the Stampede eleven years previously, invited ranchers to enter their chuckwagons and crews to compete for a total of $275 in prize money. In 2009, the total purse available to racers was $1.15 million. Drivers can earn additional awards:

- The Guy Weadick Award is awarded for overall sportsmanship and exemplifying the spirit of the Calgary Stampede.
- The Richard Cosgrave Memorial Award, named after former driver and 2-time aggregate winner Richard Cosgrave, died in 1993, is awarded for the best aggregate time during the first 8 days of the Rangeland Derby.
- The Orville Strandquist Award, named for the great cowboy Orville Strandquist, recognizes the top rookie driver (based on dollars won) during the Rangeland Derby year.

The actual origin of the sport is unknown, with many different stories offered. Among them are the suggestions that Weadick first saw a similar event at the 1922 Gleichen Stampede, that he saw impromptu races between chuckwagon drivers as a kid growing up, or that cooks from two chuckwagons who had completed serving a barbecue at the 1919 Victory Stampede in Calgary then raced to the grandstand's exit, inspiring the event.

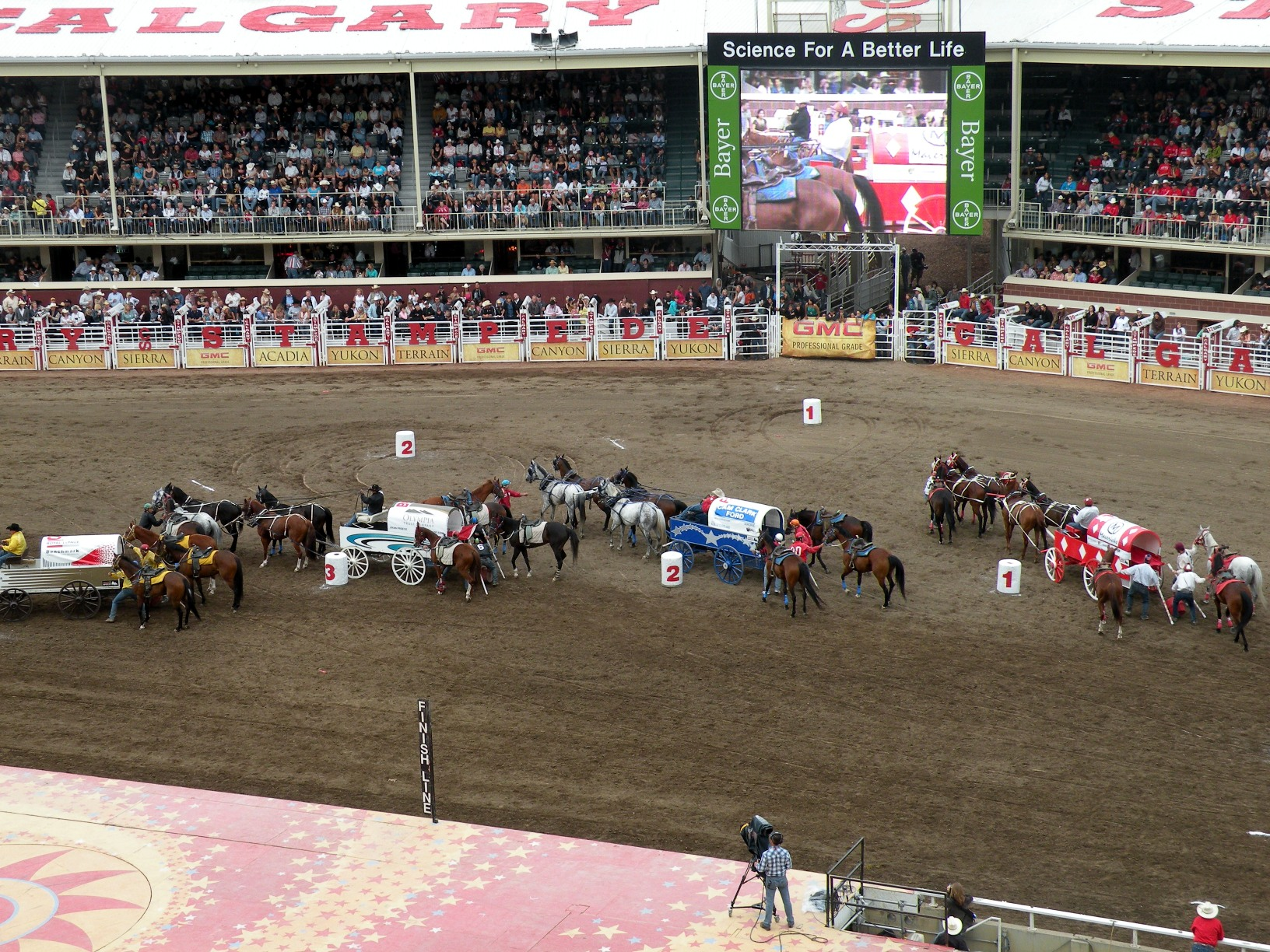
Wagons lined up before the start of a race

The first professional racing circuit was sanctioned in 1949 by the Cowboys Protective Association (today the World Professional Chuckwagon Association), which sanctioned all professional rodeo and chuckwagon races in Canada, including the Calgary Stampede. It operates the GMC Pro Tour, a 10-event season with events held throughout Alberta and northeastern British Columbia. Another organization, the Northern Chuckwagon Association, was formed in the late 1970s, eventually becoming the Canadian Professional Chuckwagon Association in 1995. The CPCA's Pro Tour hosts events in Central Saskatchewan and northern Alberta. In 2001 the Western Chuckwagon Association was formed in Northern Alberta. They raced in venues across the Peace River Country with major shows in Grande Prairie, AB and Dawson Creek, BC. The WCA had around 20-25 active drivers but as of 2025 most have moved to the WPCA.

While it is mostly seen on the Canadian prairies, chuckwagon racing has often been held in conjunction with many rodeos across North America.

The sport can be very dangerous for wagon drivers and outriders. There have been five human deaths related to the Rangeland Derby at the Calgary Stampede. Three occurred between 1948 and 1971, one of which was a spectator struck by an outrider's horse, and two occurred in the 1990s; an outrider in 1996 and a driver in 1999.

== Horse welfare and deaths ==
The sport has faced opposition from animal welfare groups, who contend that it is unnecessarily cruel to the horses (which occasionally suffer injuries requiring them to be euthanized), and want the sport banned. For instance, four horses died following chuckwagon races at the 2009 Calgary Stampede, and a wagon crash during the 2007 Stampede in which three horses died and a driver hospitalized led officials in Calgary to review the safety of the sport. Six horses died in 2010, two from heart attacks. Approximately 65 horses have died in chuckwagon races at that event between 1986 and 2015. In 2013, a 12-year-old thoroughbred ridden by an outrider collapsed with a burst lung artery and died shortly afterwards, a death attributed to exercise-induced pulmonary hemorrhage. In 2019, the Calgary Stampede tied for the second most deadliest year for horse fatalities when six horses were killed in chuckwagon races. Four horses were euthanized after suffering leg injuries in races at the 2015 Stampede. Three horses were euthanized after being injured at the 2024 Calgary Stampede.

Supporters of the event argue that the horses are well cared for, before and after the race itself. At the Calgary Stampede, officials work closely with local Society for the Prevention of Cruelty to Animals and Calgary Humane Society staff to ensure that the horses are fit enough to endure the race. In a 2009 interview, the stampede president, who is also a veterinarian, remarked that "regrettably, an animal will die from time to time. If you're on any ranch or if you're on any farming operation, animals die. So do humans."
