= Monarchy in Alberta =

Function of the Canadian monarchy in Alberta

King in Right of Alberta
- Provincial
- Coat of arms of Alberta

Incumbent
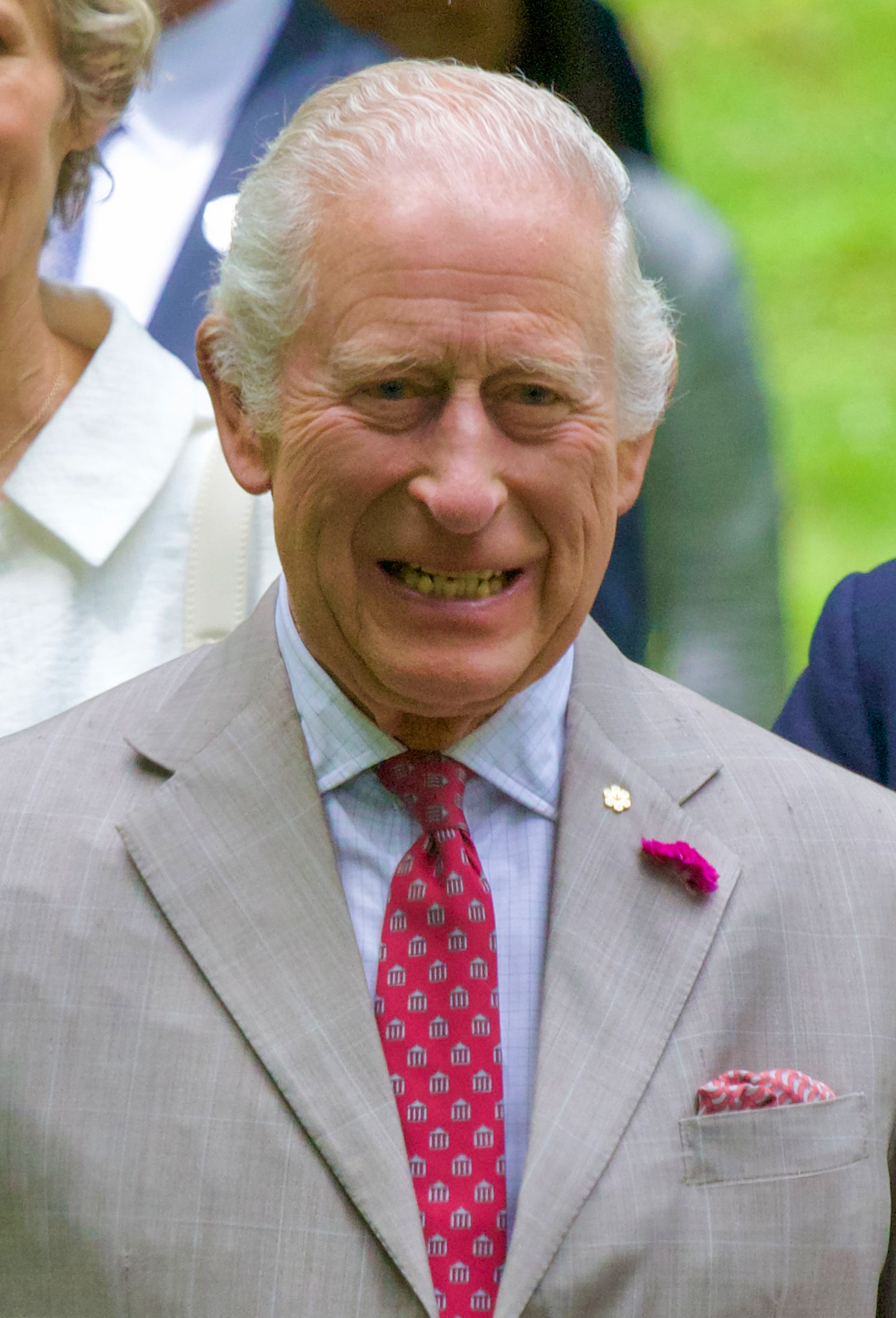
- Charles III; King of Canada since 8 September 2022

Details
- Style: His Majesty
- First monarch: Edward VII
- Formed: 1 September 1905

By the arrangements of the Canadian federation, Canada's monarchy operates in Alberta as the core of the province's Westminster-style parliamentary democracy. As such, the Crown within Alberta's jurisdiction is referred to as the Crown in Right of Alberta, His Majesty in Right of Alberta, or The King in Right of Alberta. The Constitution Act, 1867, however, leaves many royal duties in Alberta specifically assigned to the sovereign's viceroy, the Lieutenant Governor of Alberta, whose direct participation in governance is limited by the conventional stipulations of constitutional monarchy.

== Constitutional role ==
The role of the Crown is both legal and practical; it functions in Alberta in the same way it does in all of Canada's other provinces, being the centre of a constitutional construct in which the institutions of government acting under the sovereign's authority share the power of the whole. It is thus the foundation of the executive, legislative, and judicial branches of the province's government.

The Canadian monarch—since 8 September 2022, King Charles III—is represented and his duties carried out by the Lieutenant Governor of Alberta, whose direct participation in governance is limited by the conventional stipulations of constitutional monarchy, with most related powers entrusted for exercise by the elected parliamentarians, the ministers of the Crown generally drawn from amongst them, and the judges and justices of the peace. The Crown today primarily functions as a guarantor of continuous and stable governance and a nonpartisan safeguard against the abuse of power. This arrangement began with the granting of royal assent to the 1905 Alberta Act and continued an unbroken line of monarchical government extending back to the late 18th century. However, though Alberta has a separate government headed by the King, as a province, Alberta is not itself a kingdom.

The Alberta Sovereignty Within a United Canada Act gives the lieutenant governor the unique ability to, following a resolution passed by the legislature, and on ministerial advice, amend any piece of legislation ("Henry VIII powers"), as well as to direct "provincial entities" to disobey any federal law for up to four years. The constitutionality of these powers remains untested.

Government House in Edmonton is owned by the sovereign only in his capacity as King in Right of Alberta and is used both as an office and official event location by the lieutenant governor, the sovereign, and other members of the Canadian royal family. The viceroy resides in a separate home provided by the provincial Crown and the King and his relations reside at a hotel when in Alberta. A member of the royal family have owned Alberta property in a private capacity; King Edward VIII (later the Duke of Windsor) owned the E.P. Ranch (formerly the Bedingfield Ranch), near High River, for more than 40 years.

== Royal associations ==
Those in the Royal Family perform ceremonial duties when on a tour of the province; the royal persons do not receive any personal income for their service, only the costs associated with the exercise of these obligations are funded by both the Canadian and Alberta Crowns in their respective councils. Monuments around Alberta mark some of those visits, while others honour a royal personage or event. Further, Alberta's monarchical status is illustrated by royal names applied regions, communities, schools, and buildings, many of which may also have a specific history with a member or members of the Royal Family. Associations also exist between the Crown and many private organizations within the province; these may have been founded by a royal charter, received a royal prefix, or been honoured with the patronage of a member of the Royal Family. Examples include the Royal United Services Institute of Alberta, which was under the patronage of Prince Andrew, Duke of York, and the Royal Tyrrell Museum of Palaeontology, which received its royal prefix from Queen Elizabeth II in 1990. At the various levels of education within Alberta there also exist a number of scholarships and academic awards either established by or named for members of the Royal Family.

The main symbol of the monarchy is the sovereign himself, his image (in portrait or effigy) thus being used to signify government authority. A royal cypher or crown may also illustrate the monarchy as the locus of authority, without referring to any specific monarch. Additionally, though the monarch does not form a part of the constitutions of Alberta's honours, they do stem from the Crown as the fount of honour, and so bear on the insignia symbols of the sovereign. The King or others in his family may bestow these honours in person: Queen Elizabeth II, when in the province in 2002, appointed Albertans to the Royal Victorian Order and presented in Alberta, on her official Canadian birthday in 2005, the insignia of the Venerable Order of Saint John to new inductees.

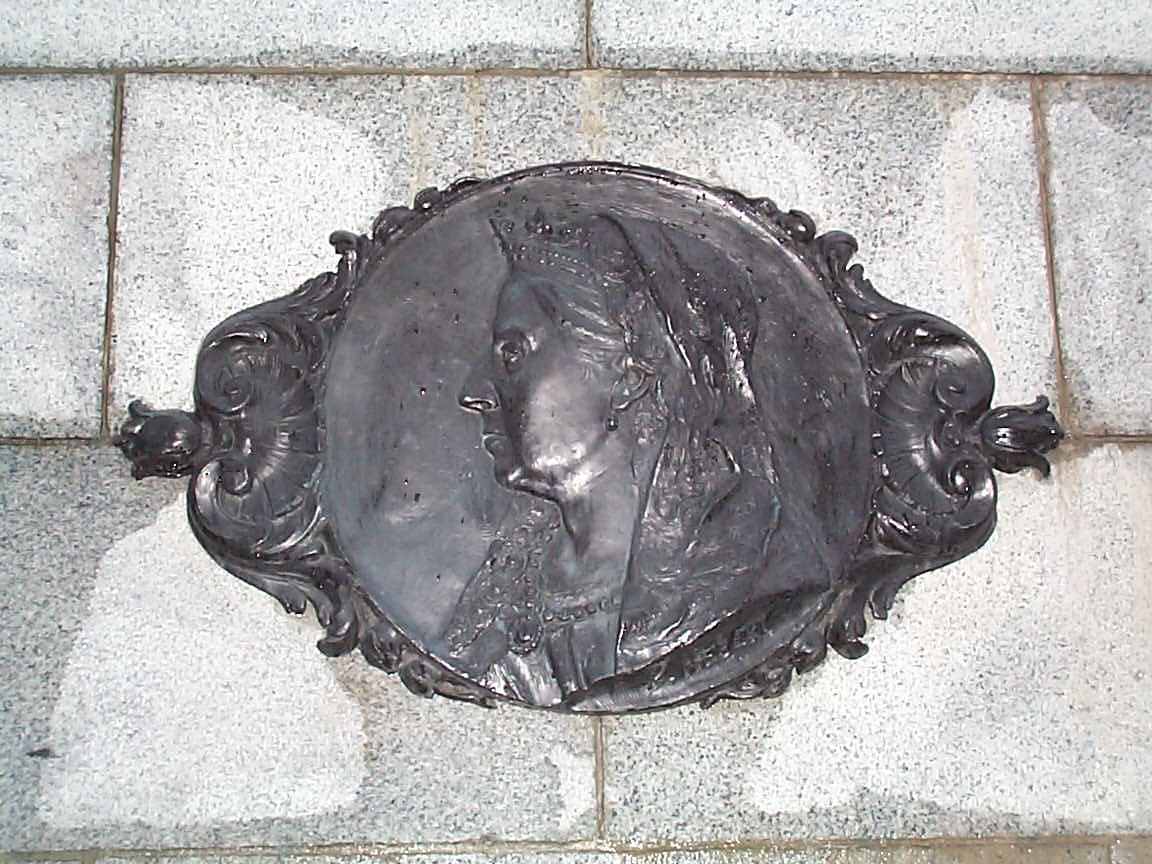
Effigy of Queen Victoria on the Second Boer War monument in Victoria Park, Calgary

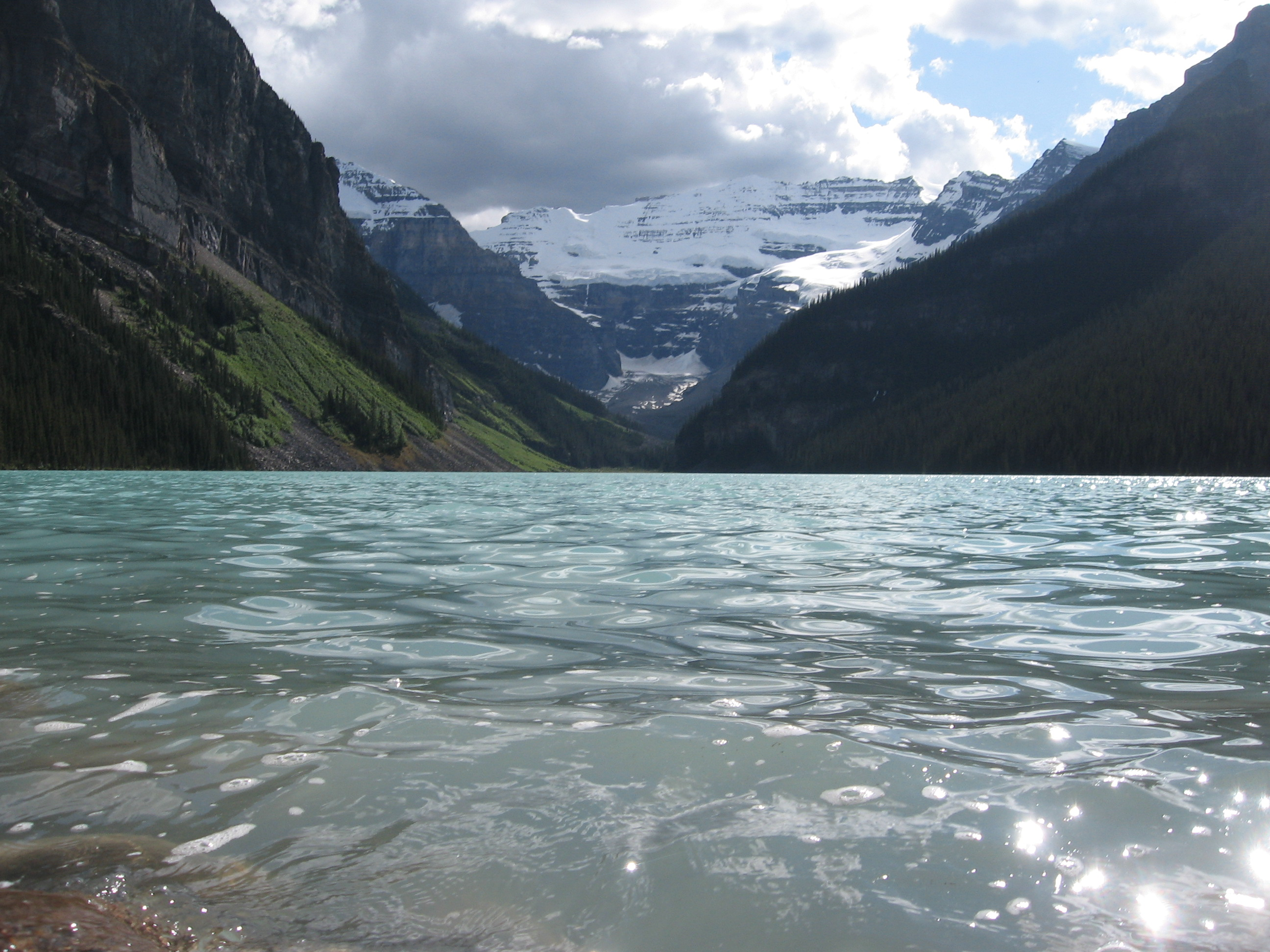
Lake Louise, named for Princess Louise, and the glacier named for her mother, Queen Victoria

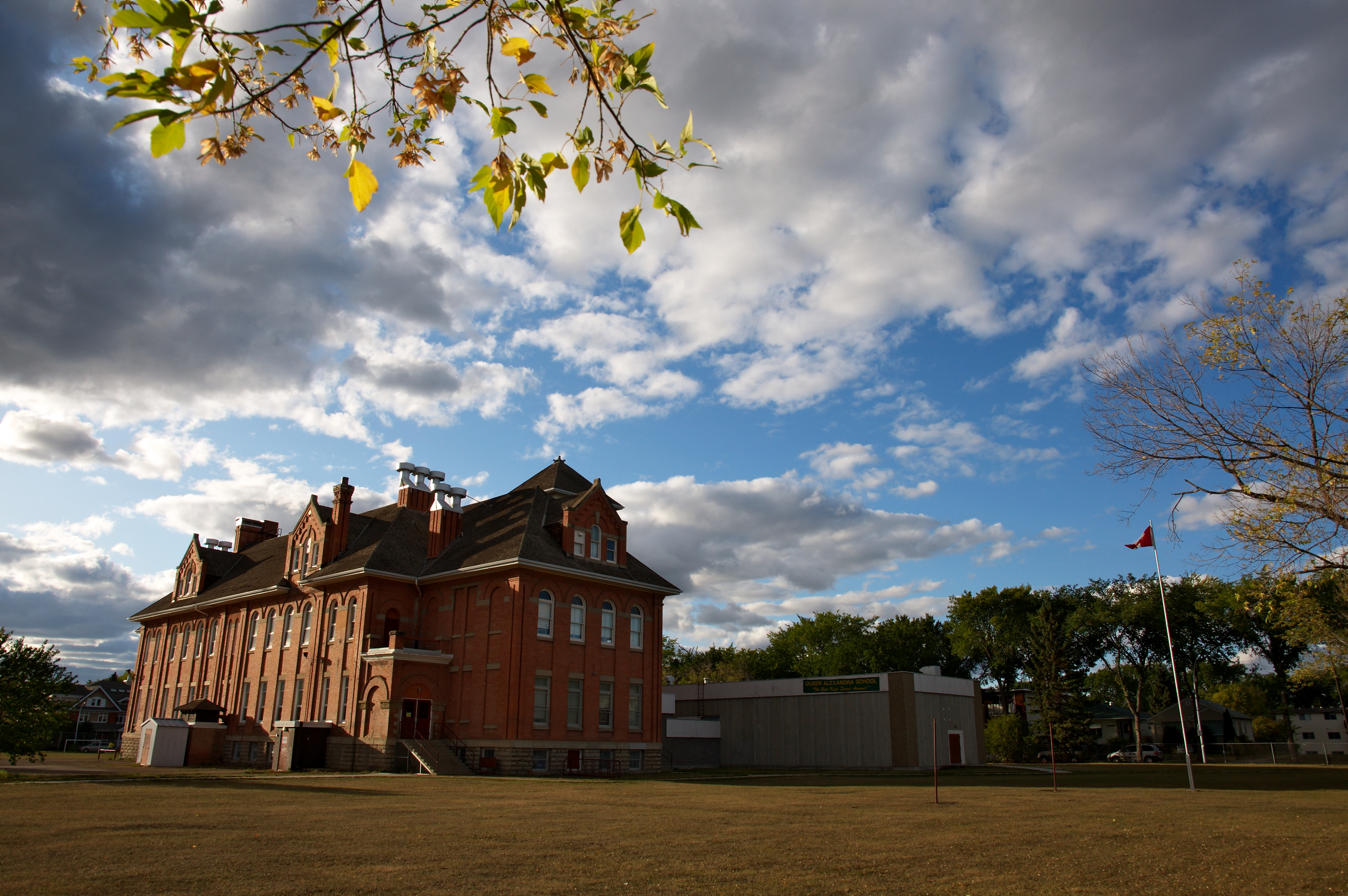
The Queen Alexandra School in Queen Alexandra, Edmonton, named for Queen Alexandra

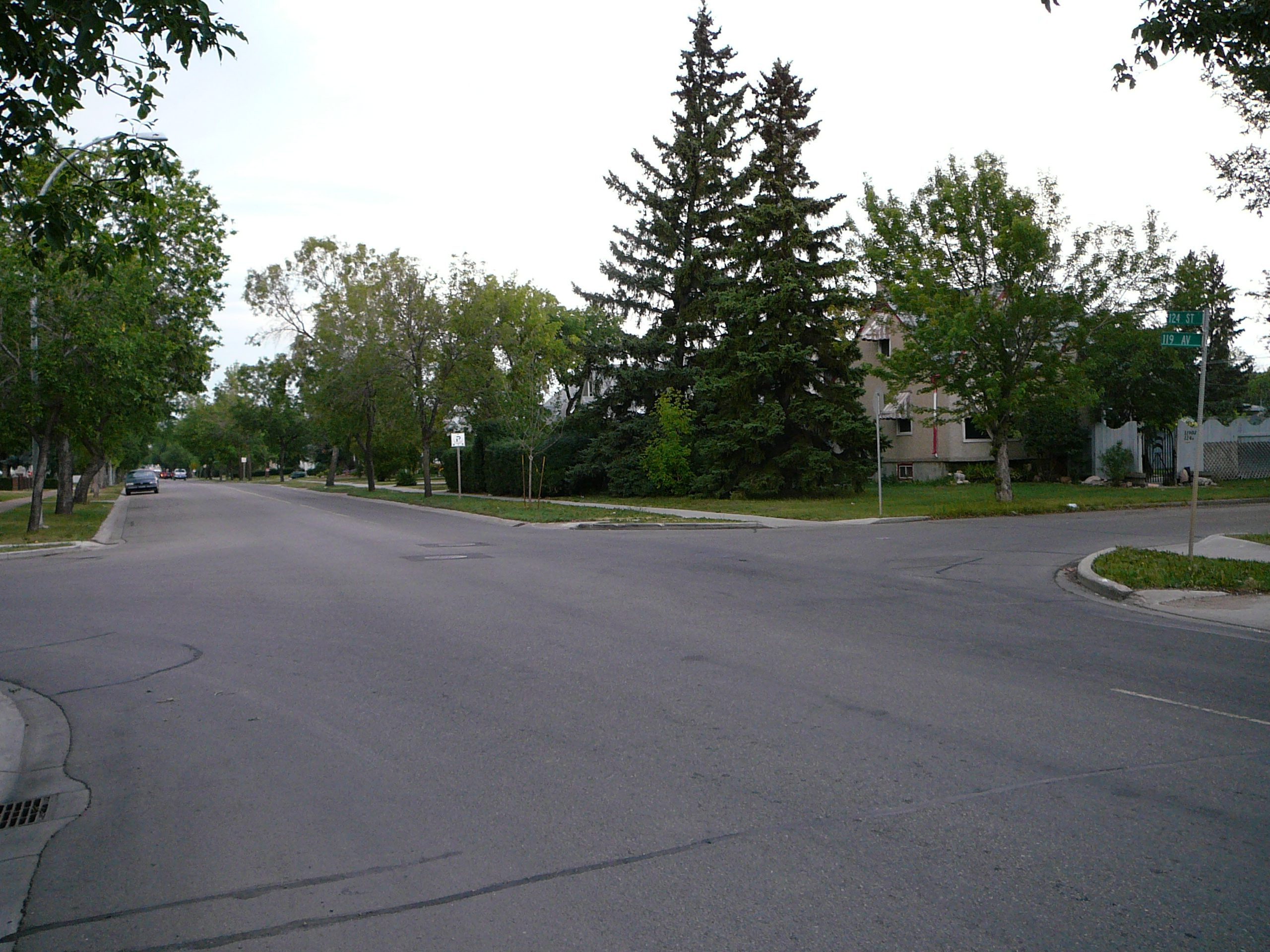
The neighbourhood of Prince Charles, Edmonton, named for Prince Charles, Prince of Wales

== History ==
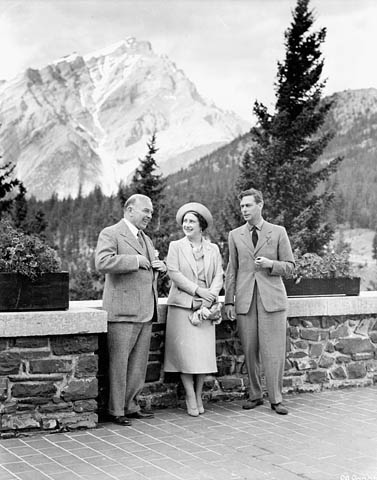
King George VI (right) and his wife, Queen Elizabeth (centre), with Prime Minister Mackenzie King (left) in Banff, Alberta, 1939

Prince Edward (the future King Edward VIII) first toured Alberta in 1919, when he was hosted at the Bar-U Ranch by George Lane. The Prince enjoyed the province's rural life so much he purchased a 400-acre (1.6 km^{2}) property nearby—outside Pekisko, High River—and named it E.P. Ranch (the initials a reversal of Prince Edward). There, he raised cattle, sheep, and horses imported from the Duchy of Cornwall. Though his father, King George V, did not approve of his son holding property in Canada—believing it would lead the other Dominions to expect the Prince to purchase land there, too—Edward held this ranch and stayed at it numerous times. One such occasion was in 1923, during which time Edward participated in typical ranch chores and dining with the hired hands on basic meals. Edward sold the ranch in 1962, a decade before his death.

A request was made by Premier Ralph Klein for the Queen of Canada to give royal assent to a bill in the Legislative Assembly of Alberta in May 2005. This request was turned down by the Office of the Governor General "for two reasons: such an unprecedented ceremony would hinder [the office's] ability to 'Canadianize' the Crown and the constitution specifically assigns to the Lieutenant-Governor the function of giving royal assent to provincial bills." That assertion, however, was contested by Professor and Senior Director of Interdisciplinary Programs at the University of Alberta, Kenneth Munro.

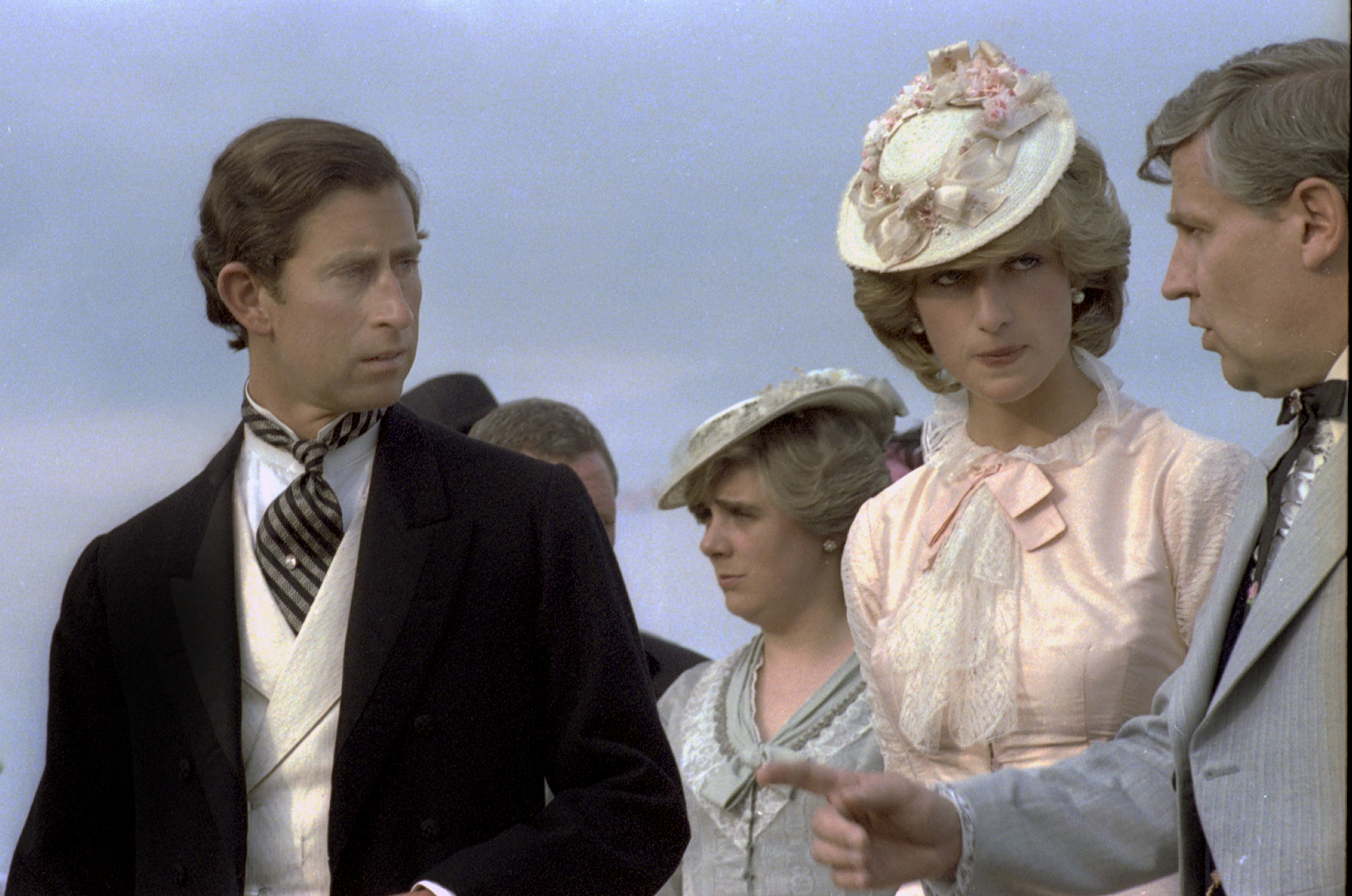
Prince Charles, Prince of Wales, and Diana, Princess of Wales, at Fort Edmonton Park, 30 June 1983

Though Queen Elizabeth II did not tour any part of the province during her Golden Jubilee royal tour in 2002, the legislative assembly and government introduced a number of events and initiatives to mark the anniversary. More than 4,000 Albertans attended the Lieutenant Governor's Jubilee Levée on 23 June, where Lois Hole stated: "what we want to realize is how important the monarchy is to Canada and certainly to Alberta." Three years later, the Queen was in Alberta to mark the province's 100th anniversary of entry into Confederation, where she attended, along with an audience of 25,000, a kick-off concert at Commonwealth Stadium and addressed the legislative assembly, becoming the first reigning monarch to do so. At the same time, the Ministry of Learning encouraged teachers to focus education on the monarchy and to organize field trips for their students to see the Queen and her consort, or to watch the events on television.

Princess Anne, Princess Royal, visited Edmonton from 5 to 8 November 2018 to attend the 28th Royal Agricultural Society of the Commonwealth conference, which was held at Edmonton Expo Centre in conjunction with Farmfair and brought 150 attendees from 23 countries in the Commonwealth of Nations. Anne, who is the society's president, took part in some of the sessions and toured the barns at Northlands. She noted that Alberta and Canada face the same challenges as other Commonwealth member-states do; namely, an aging farming population, difficulty attracting new entrants, land access, changing dietary trends, and environmental concerns. At Government House, the Princess also launched the Edmonton Commonwealth Walkway, which was proposed by Lieutenant Governor Lois Hole, funded by private donors, and built "as a way to honour the long-standing service of Her Majesty the Queen and celebrate the shared values of democracy, human rights, and the rule of law that unite Commonwealth nations."

In 2022, Alberta instituted a provincial Platinum Jubilee medal to mark Elizabeth II's seventy years on the Canadian throne; the first time in Canada's history that a royal occasion was commemorated on provincial medals.

== See also ==
- Symbols of Alberta
- Monarchy

== Sources ==
- MacLeod, Kevin S. (2008). A Crown of Maples (PDF) (1 ed.). Ottawa: Queen's Printer for Canada. p. 16. ISBN 978-0-662-46012-1.
