= Bar U Ranch =

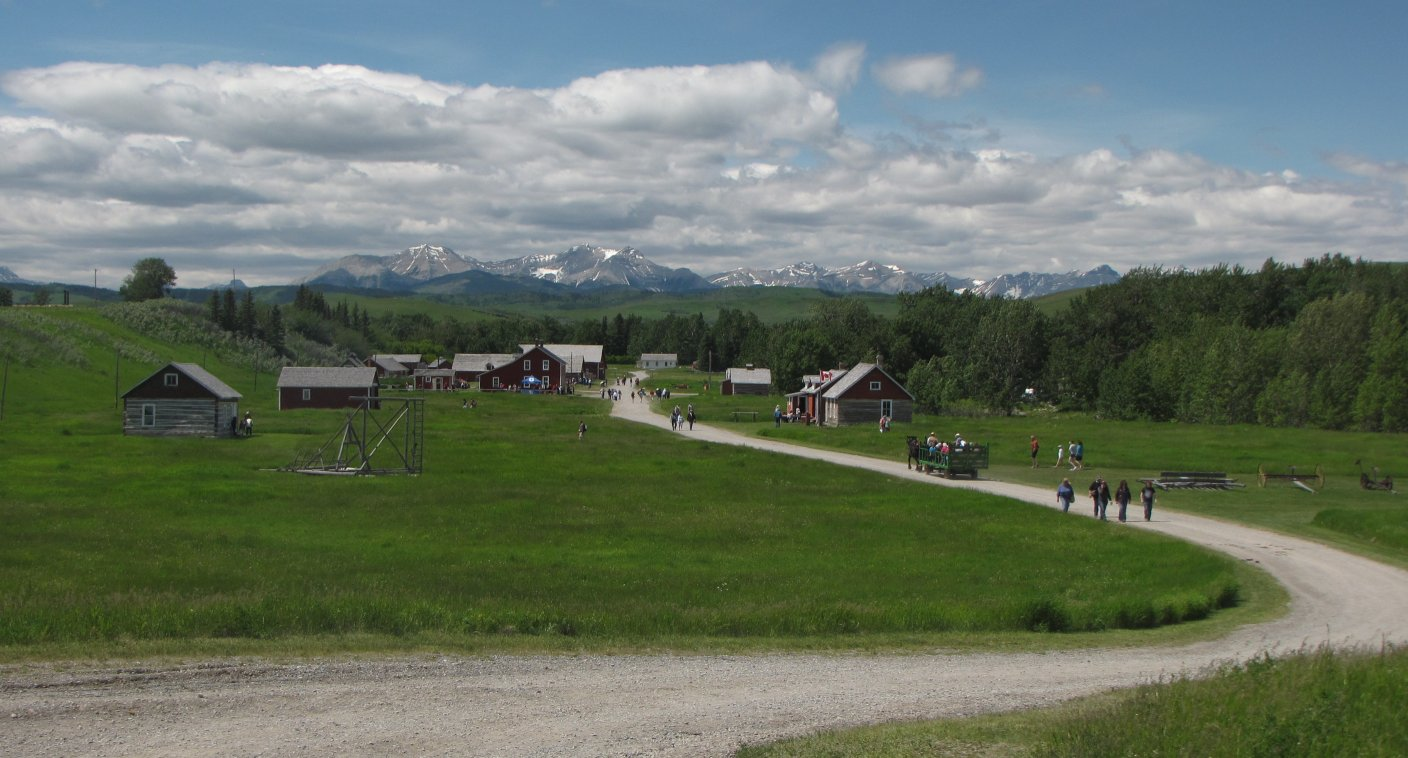
- Interactive map of Bar U Ranch
- Location: Longview, Alberta, Alberta, Canada
- Nearest city: Foothills No. 31, Alberta

History
- Established: 1881
- Founder: Fred Stimson, George Lane, Patrick Burns

Site notes
- Area: 148.43 ha, 367 acres
- Governing body: Parks Canada
- Website: Parks Canada page

National Historic Site of Canada
- Designated: 1991

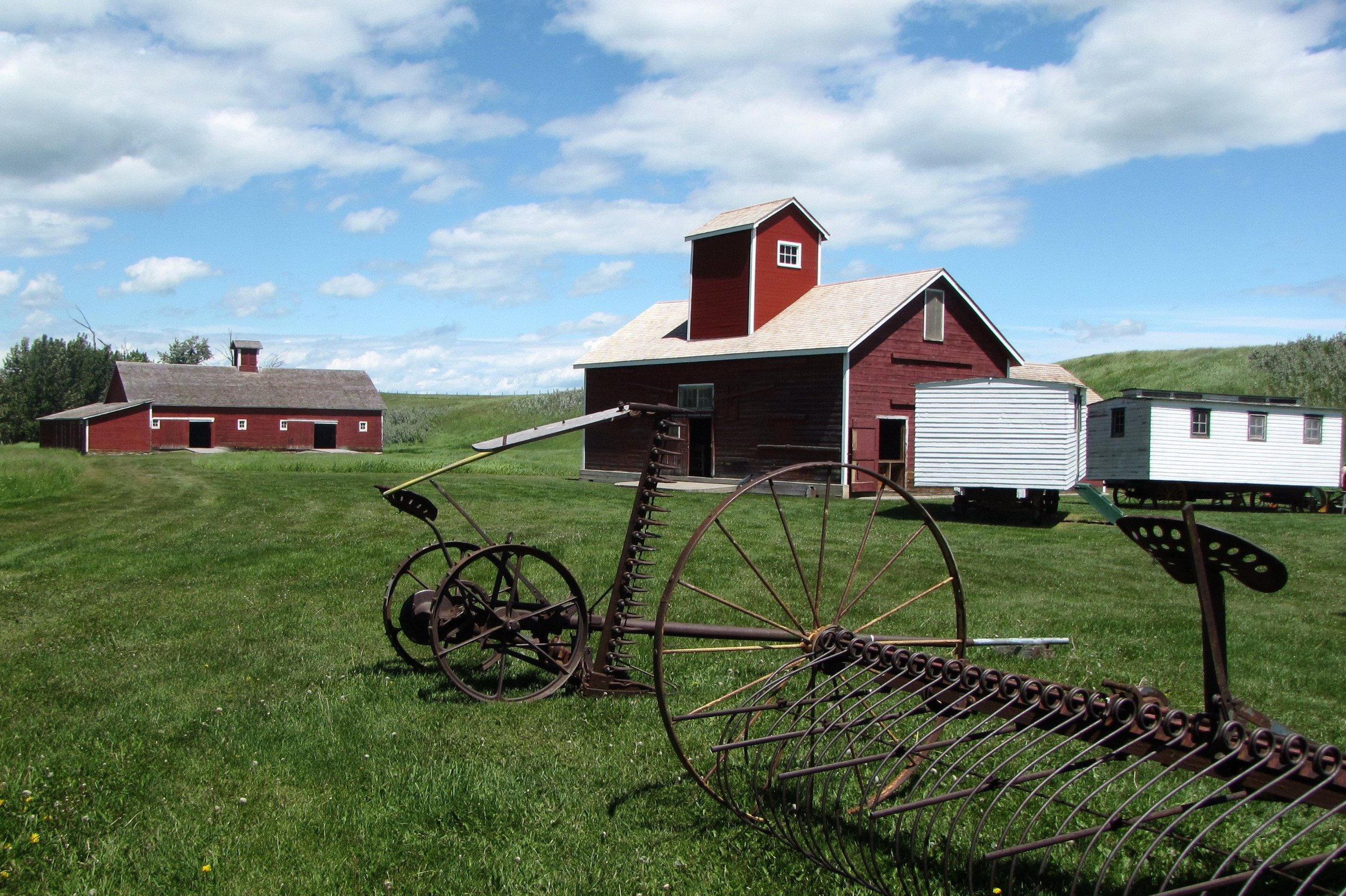

The Bar U Ranch, located near Longview, Alberta, Canada, is a preserved ranch and a National Historic Site of Canada. For 70 years it was one of the leading ranching operations in Canada, that at its peak extended over 160,000 acres (65,000 ha) with 30,000 cattle and 1000 Percheron horses. Two owners were instrumental in the establishment of the Calgary Stampede, forming part of the Big Four.

The ranch was founded by Fred Stimson, whose North West Cattle Company kept cattle on 147,000 acres (59,000 ha) of open range between 1881 and 1902. Stimson used the Bar U brand for NWCC stock. From 1902 to 1925 the Bar U was operated by George Lane and his business partners, whose business ventures included meat packing, mills and other farms and ranches. Lane renamed the operation the Bar U Ranch, buying out his partners in 1908. Lane raised both cattle and Percherons.

From 1927 to 1950 the Bar U was part of a group of ranches operated by Patrick Burns totalling 700,000 acres. Burns grew grains on the ranch, which remained one of the largest ranches in Canada during the period.

After 1950 much of the ranch land was sold. The present National Historic Site is the central remnant, owned by Parks Canada, which bought the property in 1991 and opened it to the public in 1995. The site features costumed historical interpreters and is open daily from mid-May to the end of September every year.

A number of prominent personalities were associated with the Bar U. In 1891, Harry Longabaugh, a horse breaker at the Bar U, later became the notoriously infamous outlaw and Wild West gun fighter "the Sundance Kid". Edward, Prince of Wales visited the Bar U in 1919 and was so taken with it that he bought a neighbouring ranch, which he named the E.P. Ranch. Charles M. Russell painted a series of paintings at the Bar U. Ranch cowboy Everett Johnson was reportedly studied as the lead character for the novel The Virginian and the later television show.
