= The Big Four (Calgary) =

Alberta cattlemen of the early 20th century

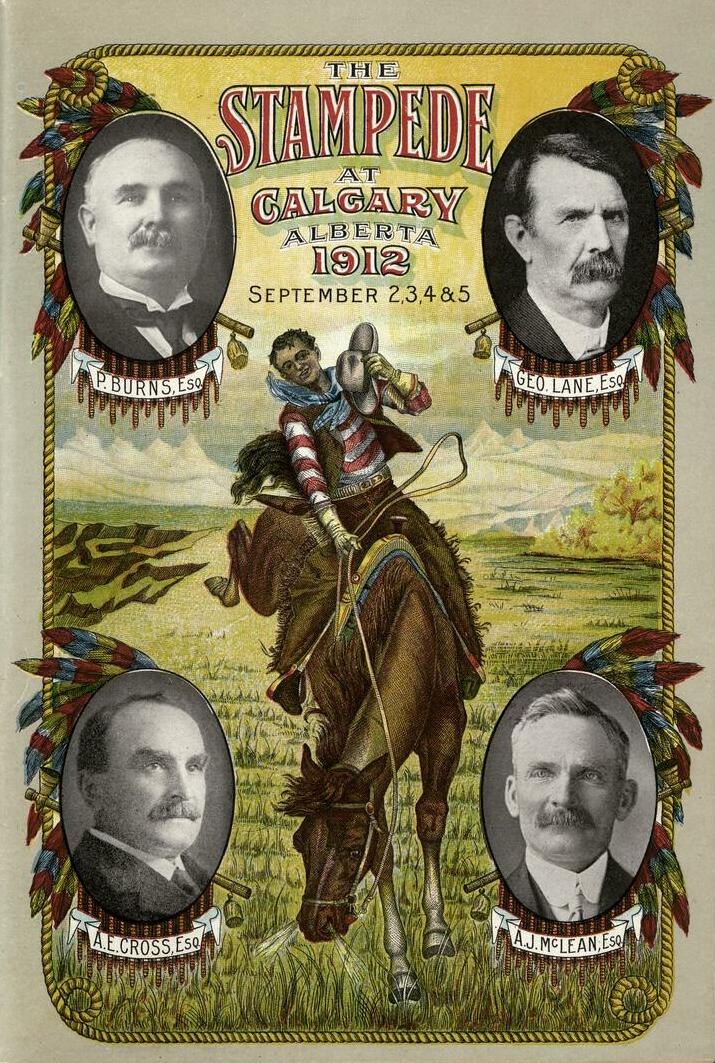
Program for the 1912 Calgary Stampede featuring the four sponsors

The Big Four were the wealthy Alberta cattlemen Patrick Burns, George Lane, A. E. Cross and Archibald J. McLean. Together they founded the Calgary Stampede, as well as other cultural and entrepreneurial activities in Calgary, Alberta, Canada in the early years of the 20th century.

George Lane and A.J. McLean were ranchers, Pat Burns owned a meat packing business and A.E. Cross was a brewery owner. All four men were involved in Alberta's cattle industry.

== Calgary Stampede ==
In the summer of 1912, the Big Four were approached by cowboy Guy Weadick with the proposal for a wild west show that would "make Buffalo Bill's Wild West Extravaganza look like a sideshow." They each put up $25,000 to finance the first Calgary Stampede held in September 1912. The event has grown since to more than $1.8 million in prize money, and attracts more than one million visitors yearly.

The Big Four Building at the Stampede Grounds in Calgary was named for the four businessmen, and once held the largest curling rink in the world.

== Political careers ==
- A.E. Cross was elected in 1898 as a Conservative member of the Legislative Assembly of Alberta ("MLA") for the riding of Calgary East.
- Archie McLean was first elected as a Liberal MLA for the Lethbridge constituency in 1909. He served as minister of municipal affairs, and as minister of public works.
- George Lane was elected to be a member in the Legislative Assembly of Alberta in 1913 for the Bow Valley riding on behalf of the Liberal Party. He held the position for less than a year; resigning his seat so that defeated party leader Charles R. Mitchell could re-gain a place in the legislature.
- Patrick Burns was appointed to the Senate of Canada in 1931 by his close friend R. B. Bennett, then Prime Minister of Canada. Burns sat in the senate as an independent until 1936.

== Legacy ==
- A.E. Cross Junior High School was named for A.E. Cross. A.E. Cross, together with Pat Burns and George Lane, as well as other prominent local figures, also funded the creation of Western Canada High School.
- Senator Patrick Burns Junior High School was named for Pat Burns
- Mount Burns, a peak in Kananaskis Country.
- Burns Building
- Senator Patrick Burns Building, at Southern Alberta Institute of Technology

== See also ==
- Big Four (disambiguation)
