= Burns Manor =

Building in Alberta, Canada

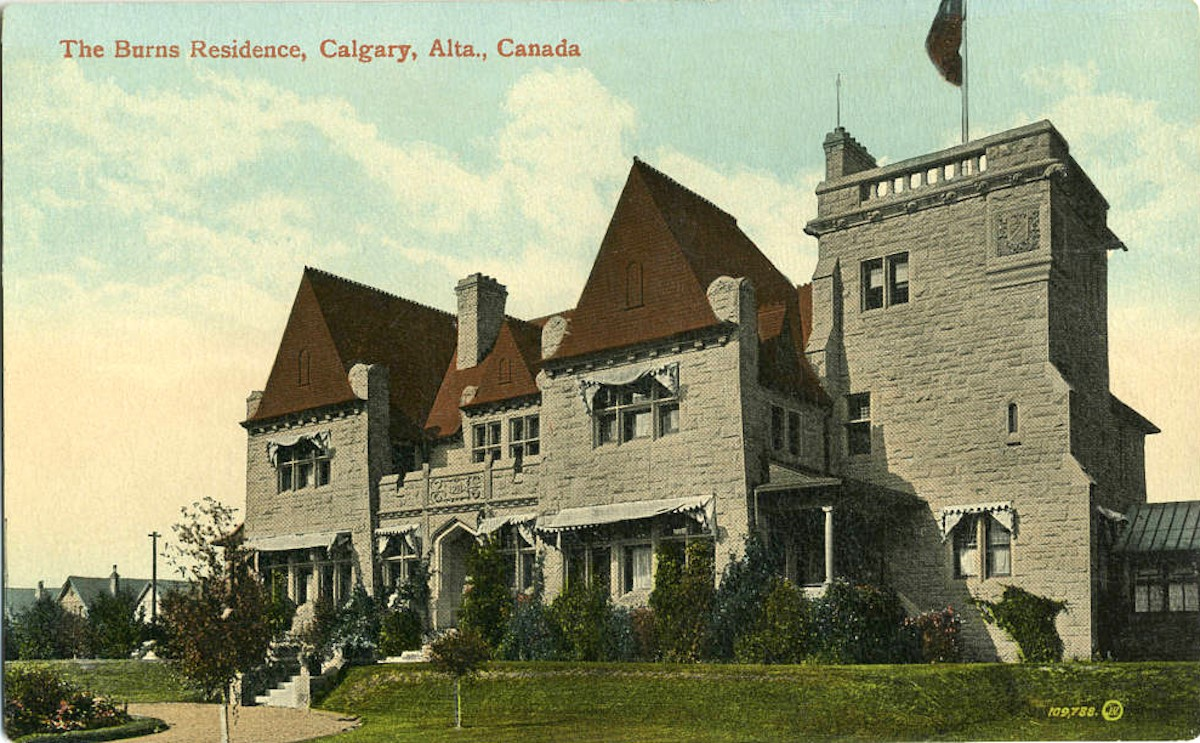
- Burns Manor circa 1903
- Interactive map of the Burns Manor area

General information
- Status: Demolished
- Type: Private Residence
- Location: Calgary; Canada
- Coordinates: 51.04118°N 114.07196°W
- Construction started: 1900
- Completed: 1903
- Demolished: 1956
- Cost: $32,000 - 40,000 (1903)
- Owner: Pat Burns

Technical details
- Floor count: 3

Design and construction
- Architect: Francis M. Rattenbury
- Main contractor: Thomas Underwood

Burns Manor was the Calgary residence of Senator Pat Burns, a successful businessman who founded Burns Meat. It was located at 510 13th Avenue S.W. in the Beltline District of Calgary, Alberta. Construction started in July 1900 and was completed in January 1903. The property was torn down in May 1956 to make room for an expansion of the Colonel Belcher Hospital. (The Colonel Belcher Hospital's services have been relocated to Carewest Colonel Belcher, and today the original location of Burns Manor is now the site of the Sheldon M. Chumir Health Centre).

== Construction ==
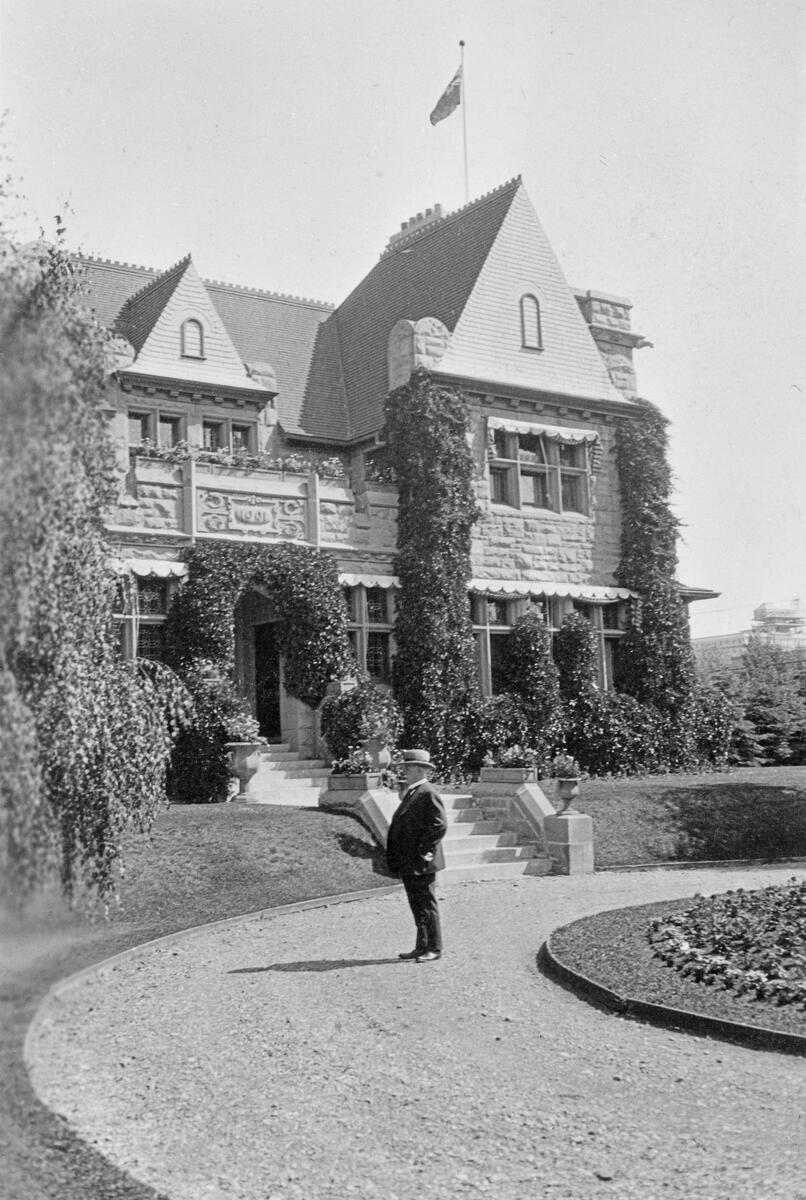
Pat Burns in driveway of his mansion ca. 1930

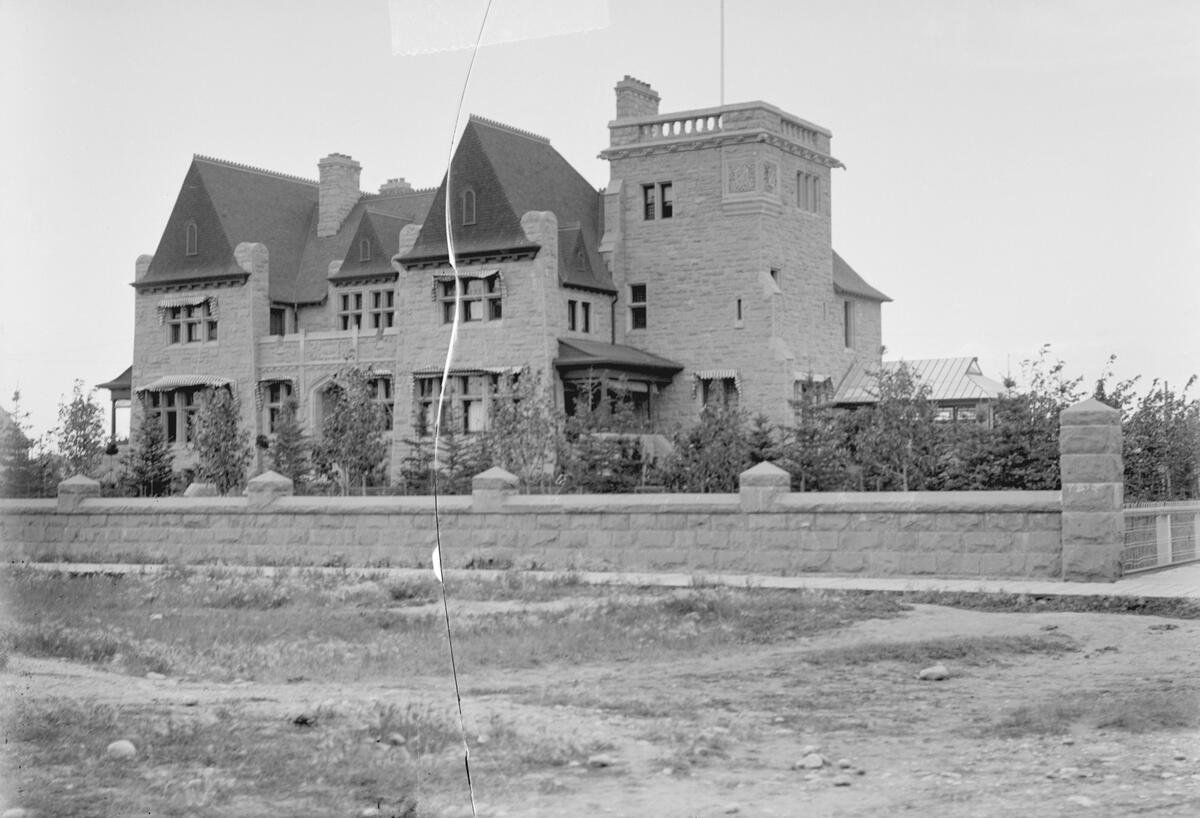
Burns Manor, ca. July -September 1905

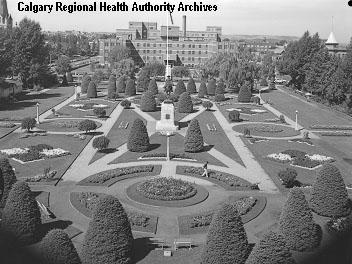
View of Central Memorial Park in Calgary with the Colonel Belcher Hospital in the background

Pat Burns commissioned the house to be built in 1900. He hired his friend, Francis Rattenbury of Victoria, British Columbia to design the building. Burns was familiar with Rattenbury as they were close friends and business associates. Thomas Underwood, who would go on to serve as Mayor of Calgary, was contracted out for construction.

The exterior was primarily sandstone which was brought in from the Shaganappi Quarry and was cut on location. Lumber for the project was milled at Colonel Walker's sawmill. Sash and solid oak doors were supplied by W.H.Cushing mills. Total cost of construction was somewhere between $32,000 - $40,000 with additional funds spent on landscaping, land, and furnishing.

== Style ==
Burns Manor was built in the Neo-Gothic style with both Arts and Crafts and Chateau motifs. It was once described as "a mixture of French Chateau and Irish castle." Symmetrical in design, it had steeply pitched gables, ornate sandstone carvings of gargoyles and coats of arms. The extensively landscaped property, surrounded by a low stone wall, resembled an English country garden.

== Interior details ==
The interior contained eighteen rooms including ten bedrooms, four bathrooms and a conservatory. There was extensive use of fine eastern hardwood. Oak was used for doors, panelling, cornices, floors and fireplace mantles. Rooms were finished in quarter-cut oak. Furnishings were imported from England.

== History ==
Construction began on the twenty lot site in July 1900. Rattenbury wrote his mother from the Alberta Hotel in Calgary on July 26, "we are laying out the lines of his [Burns] new house." By October the stone foundation was completed. Burns and his bride were married September 4, 1901 in London, England. On their return to Calgary in August they took up residence in the Alberta Hotel where they remained until the house was completed, considerably behind schedule, in January 1903. Head Gardener, William Reader and his wife lived in the coach house on the property until he left Burns' employ and in 1912 became Calgary's Superintendent of Parks. William Mayhew was the resident gardener from 1917 to 1937.

When Alberta became a province in 1905, a reception was held at Burns Manor for Sir Wilfrid Laurier and Lady Laurier. Over the years the Burns' entertained members of the royal family, aristocrats, authors and politicians. At the height of the boom in 1911 the mansion and property were valued at $150,000 (approximately equivalent to $4,105,000 in 2025).

Following Patrick Burns death in February 1937 the house stood empty for two years. In 1939 it was leased to Mrs. L. Barber to house "20 bachelor boarders." During the war years the Department of Veterans Affairs took over the house and used it as a convalescent home.

== Destruction ==
On July 30, 1941 the Department of Pensions and Health was authorized to purchase the property and construction of a new hospital began a year later. Burns' large sandstone residence was included in the purchase and used as part of the new hospital facilities.

In May 1955 Mrs. A. H. Turney, President of the Colonel Belcher Hospital Women's Auxiliary led an unsuccessful attempt to save the "historical landmark" from demolition lobbying the Department of Veterans Affairs and the City of Calgary. The Auxiliary wanted to use the residence as a club and canteen for the DVA patients.

In May 1956 the mansion was demolished to "allow access to the new entrance of the Colonel Belcher Hospital." A sign on the lawn indicated "Salvage for Sale." Calgarians hauled away oak mantles, staircases, panelling, sandstone and tiles. City workers moved sandstone from the demolished mansion to the hillside at the north end of Riley Park and in June 1956 construction began on the Senator Patrick Burns Memorial Gardens.

Present day the site is the location of the Sheldon M. Chumir Centre.

== See also ==
- Burns Building
