= Pekisko, Alberta =

Community in Alberta, Canada

Pekisko
- unincorporated community
- Location of Pekisko in Alberta
- Coordinates: 50°25′58″N 114°09′38″W
- Country: Canada
- Province: Alberta
- Census division: No. 6
- Municipal district: Foothills County

Government
  - Type: Unincorporated
- Time zone: UTC−7 (MST)
  - Summer (DST): UTC−6 (MDT)

Pekisko is an unincorporated community in southern Alberta, Canada. It is located in the Foothills County, east of the junction of Cowboy Trail and Highway 540, 35 kilometres (22 mi) south of High River and 19 km (12 mi) south of Longview.

It lies in the Canadian Rockies foothills, north of the Highwood River, at an elevation of 1,215 m (3,986 ft), and is the centre of the Pekisko Rangeland, an area of livestock grazing and agriculture. Oil and gas is an increasing part of the economy.

The name Pekisko originates from the Blackfoot language i ta pisko, meaning rolling foothills.

The Pekisko Formation (Mississippian limestone) of the Rundle Group was named after this community. A hybrid of Pisum sativum (pea) was also named Pekisko after this area.

== Pekisko area ranches ==
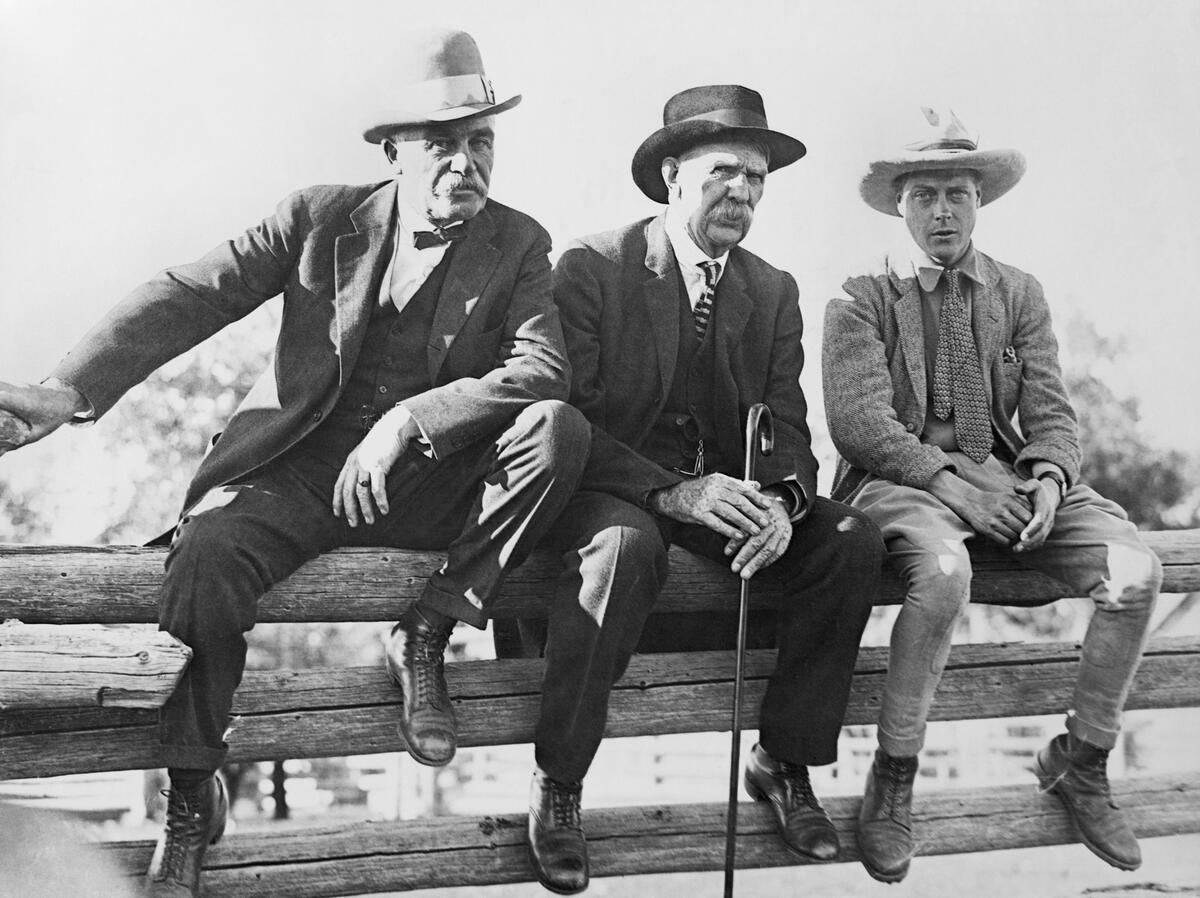
Edward, Prince of Wales, sitting on a corral fence with Archibald J. McLean and George Lane at the EP Ranch in October 1924

Pekisko is ranching country and two famous ranches operated there for decades: the Bar-U Ranch, owned by Calgary Stampede founder George Lane, and the E.P. Ranch (formerly the Bedingfeld Ranch).

After touring Canada in 1919, the Prince of Wales bought the Bedingfeld cattle ranch, which had been founded in 1886 by Mrs. Bedingfeld, a widow of a British army officer who died in India. The ranch became known as the Prince of Wales Ranch or the E.P. Ranch. The E.P. brand used on the ranch stood for "Edward Prince". The prince briefly became King of the United Kingdom and King of Canada in 1936.

In 1925, cowboy movie star Hoot Gibson was filmed in scenes at the E.P. Ranch as part of the Hollywood movie The Calgary Stampede.

== Climate ==
According to the 1971–2000 normals with the Köppen–Geiger climate classification system, Pekisko has a firmly subarctic climate, or as lower elevations nearby have humid continental climates, a subalpine climate (Dfc). Like other subpolar climates, summers are short and lukewarm, but while typically sub-freezing, winters average out to be fairly mild, being considered "maritime subarctic" (Eo) according to the Trewartha climate classification system. Being on the immediate leeward side of the Canadian Rockies, Chinook (Föhn) winds can sometimes drive winter temperatures well above freezing—during a particularly extreme event on 31 January 1906, the temperature rose to an exceptional 80 °F (26.7 °C), possibly the highest January temperature ever recorded at such a high latitude. Like at lower elevations in the Canadian Prairies, precipitation peaks in late spring and summer, but Pekisko experiences significantly more than those elevations due to the orographic effect, and it is also significantly less seasonal.

Climate data for Pekisko (1971–2000 normals)
Month	Jan	Feb	Mar	Apr	May	Jun	Jul	Aug	Sep	Oct	Nov	Dec	Year
Record high °C (°F)	26.7 (80.1)	24.4 (75.9)	19.4 (66.9)	30.6 (87.1)	29.5 (85.1)	32.8 (91.0)	36.1 (97.0)	32.8 (91.0)	32.8 (91.0)	28.3 (82.9)	26.7 (80.1)	18.3 (64.9)	36.1 (97.0)
Mean daily maximum °C (°F)	−1.8 (28.8)	0.1 (32.2)	3.2 (37.8)	8.7 (47.7)	13.8 (56.8)	18.1 (64.6)	21.1 (70.0)	20.4 (68.7)	15.6 (60.1)	10.9 (51.6)	2.7 (36.9)	−1 (30)	9.3 (48.7)
Daily mean °C (°F)	−8.6 (16.5)	−6.7 (19.9)	−3.4 (25.9)	2 (36)	6.9 (44.4)	10.7 (51.3)	13.1 (55.6)	12.6 (54.7)	8.1 (46.6)	3.8 (38.8)	−3.5 (25.7)	−7.7 (18.1)	2.3 (36.1)
Mean daily minimum °C (°F)	−15.4 (4.3)	−13.5 (7.7)	−9.9 (14.2)	−4.8 (23.4)	−0.1 (31.8)	3.3 (37.9)	4.9 (40.8)	4.7 (40.5)	0.6 (33.1)	−3.4 (25.9)	−9.8 (14.4)	−14.4 (6.1)	−4.8 (23.4)
Record low °C (°F)	−46.7 (−52.1)	−46.1 (−51.0)	−42.8 (−45.0)	−31.1 (−24.0)	−25.6 (−14.1)	−8.9 (16.0)	−3.9 (25.0)	−6.1 (21.0)	−22.2 (−8.0)	−31 (−24)	−40.5 (−40.9)	−46.7 (−52.1)	−46.7 (−52.1)
Average precipitation mm (inches)	39.3 (1.55)	36 (1.4)	49.9 (1.96)	66.7 (2.63)	82.6 (3.25)	86.9 (3.42)	66.9 (2.63)	84.3 (3.32)	62.2 (2.45)	37.3 (1.47)	35.1 (1.38)	35.3 (1.39)	682.6 (26.87)
Source: Environment and Climate Change Canada
