= Burns Building =

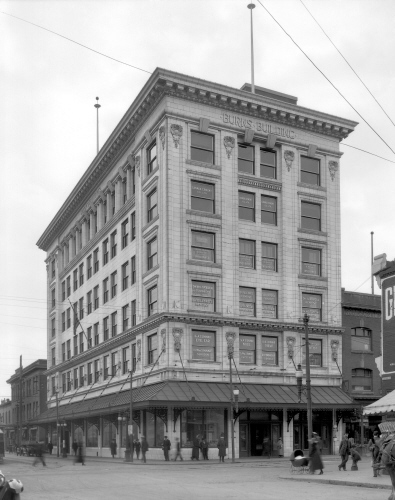
- Burns Building (1930s)
- Interactive map of the Burns Building area

General information
- Status: Completed
- Type: Office
- Location: Calgary, Alberta, Canada
- Coordinates: 51.0452°N 114.0582°W
- Construction started: 1911
- Completed: 1912
- Cost: C$350,000 (1911)
- Owner: Pat Burns (1911–1923)
- Management: Triumph Mgmt. Realty Ltd.

Technical details
- Floor count: 6

Design and construction
- Architects: Hodgson, Bates and Beattie (1911); A.J. Diamond and Partners (1981); Carruthers and McCullum (1981)
- Main contractor: Norton – Griffiths Steel Construction Company of Vancouver

The Burns Building is a historic six-story building located in downtown Calgary, Alberta. It sits at 237 8 Avenue SE on the end of Stephen Avenue overlooking Olympic Plaza and City Hall.

== History ==
The building was commissioned by meat baron Pat Burns as the corporate headquarters and flagship market for his empire, Burns Foods. Burns bought the property around 1909 but excavation did not begin until the fall of 1911. Construction commenced in April 1912. 1913 was a big year for building in Calgary. The Palliser Hotel, Lancaster Block, Canada Life Building and the Hudson's Bay store were built. The Herald Building (demolished in 1972 and now the site of the Len Werry Building) was also under construction.

In 1923 Pat Burns exchanged the building for the Glengarry Ranch.

== Original use ==
The ground level provided retail space for Burns' retail meat market. The 130-foot (40 m) long market hall featured twelve 25-foot (7.6 m) high Doric marble columns. Burns leased out the remaining 35,000 square feet (3,300 m^{2}) of office space to a wide variety of tenants. Historian Hugh Dempsey wrote, "the list of businesses which occupied the Patrick Burns Building…reads like a corporate Who's Who." Calgary Power, Alberta Investment and Insurance Brokers, Rocky Mountain Cement and a variety of dentists, doctors, lawyers, realtors, insurance agents and accountants were among the first tenants.

== Architecture ==
The building was built in the style of Edwardian Classical. The exterior features Lions' heads and other ornamental mouldings sculptured in the surface of the terracotta. Inside white and green Italian marble was used to finish the main stairways and corridors. The building included modern conveniences like steam heating and ventilation. In addition to electricity, each office was equipped with natural gas lighting.

Between 1981 and 1984 the building underwent extensive renovations designed by architects A.J. Diamond and Partners with Carruthers and McCullum.

== Historic status ==
Around 1980 the demolition of the Burns building became a possibility when it was proposed that the property it sat on was needed for the construction of the Calgary Centre for the Performing Arts. In a June 1980 report the situation was clearly outlined. "Our [the city's] urban planning consultants (Hanen and Moriyama) have recommended that two heritage buildings in this block be preserved, namely the Calgary Public Building and the Burns Building. At the time of the recommendation it was thought possible to fit the necessary concert halls and theatres in and around the two old buildings. A more detailed study by the architects for the performing arts group [Stevenson Raines] and their theatre consultants has indicated that while this can be done, a better result can be achieved if the land under the Burns Building were to be available for performing arts purposes." Ultimately the demolition proposal was defeated by one City Council vote. The Burns Building, like the Public Building was saved and incorporated into the design of Performing Arts Centre.

In 1987 it was officially designated a Provincial Heritage Resource.

== See also ==
- Pat Burns
- Burns Manor
