= E.P. Ranch =

Ranch and royal residence in Alberta, Canada

E. P. Ranch
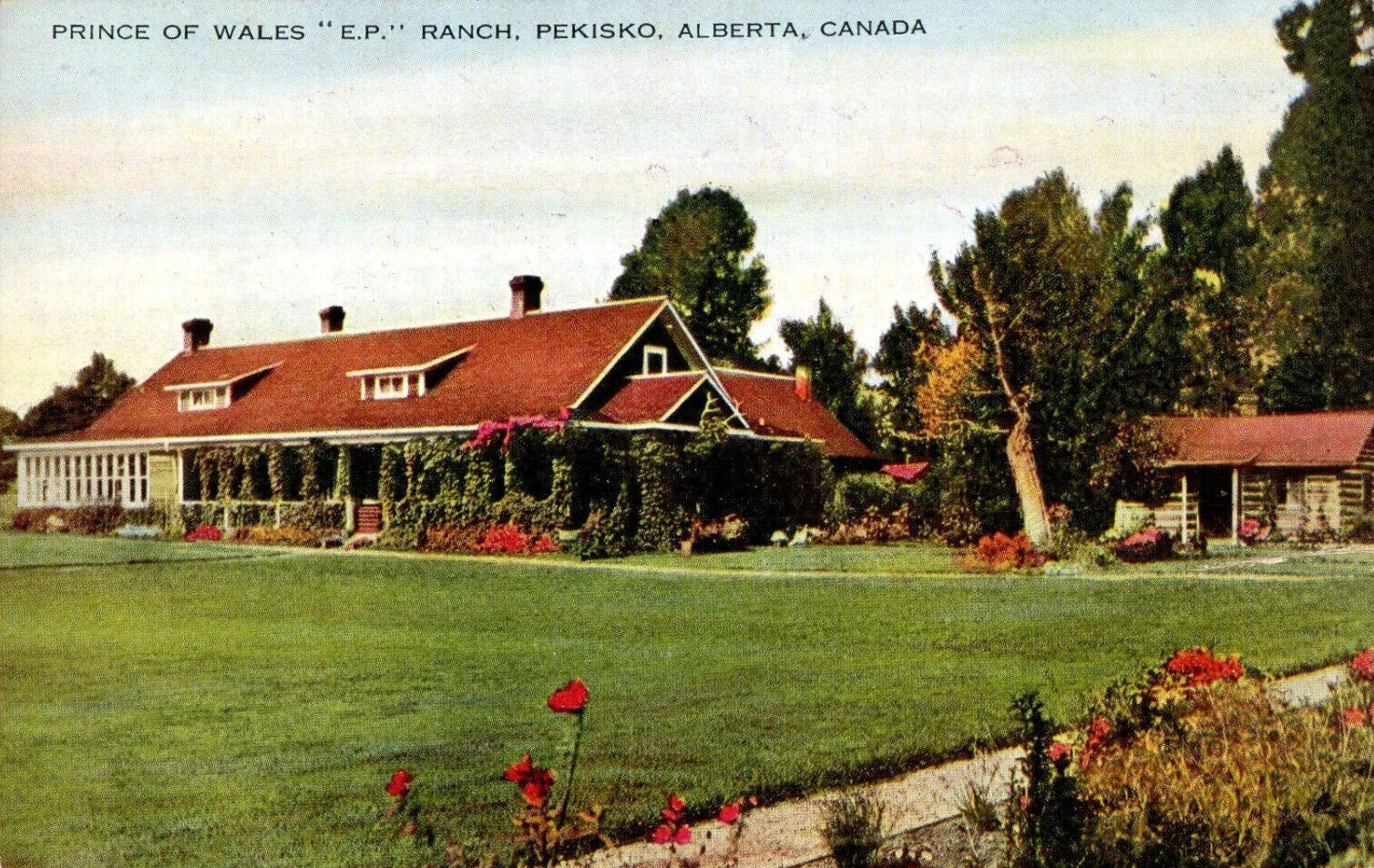
- Prince of Wales ("E.P. Ranch"), 1920
- Town/City: Pekisko
- Province: Alberta
- Country: Canada
- Established: 1886
- Owner: Bedingfield Family (1884–1919); Edward VIII (1919–1962); Cartwright Family (1962–)

The E.P. Ranch, formally known as the Bedingfield Ranch, was a ranch and royal residence in Pekisko, Alberta, that was owned from 1919 to 1962 by Edward VIII.

== History ==
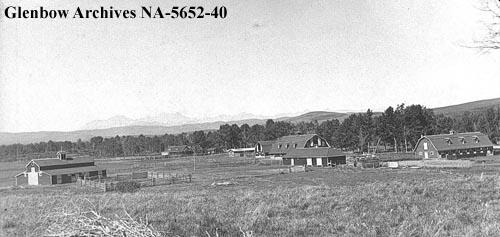
E.P. Ranch (1923)

In 1884, Mrs. A. K. Bedingfield and her son Frank Bedingfield moved from the United Kingdom to the Pekisko region of the North-West Territories' District of Alberta to start a ranch. In 1886, Frank and Mrs. Bedingfield applied for homesteads on adjacent quarters of land. As a widow, Bedingfield was eligible to apply for a homestead. While improving their homesteads and ranch lands, Frank worked for the adjacent Bar U Ranch, before eventually starting to acquire his own herd of cattle and enlarging the family's land holdings. At its peak, the family owned over 5.8 km^{2} (1,440 acres) of land and held the grazing rights to a further 160 km^{2} (40,000 acres). In addition to cattle, the Bedingfields raised and bred Percheron and Clydesdale horses.

=== Edward VIII's ownership ===
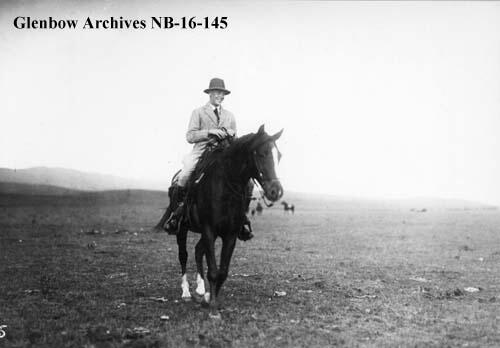
The Prince of Wales (later King Edward VIII) riding at the Bar U Ranch (1919)

In 1919, the Prince of Wales (later King Edward VIII and the Duke of Windsor) made a royal tour of Canada. During a stay at the Bar U Ranch, one of the largest ranching operations in Canada, Edward announced his interest to the Bar U's owner, George Lane, in purchasing a ranch. The two visited five ranches during Edward's stay at the Bar U, and Lane, on Edward's behalf, entered into negotiations with the Bedingfield family to purchase the ranch. The total agreed purchase price $130,000 which included payment of $6,200/km^{2} ($25/acre), a half share in 168 km^{2} (41,400 acres) of leased grazing land, 400 head of horses, and 150 head of cattle.

Unable to manage the E.P. Ranch himself, Edward delegated the overseeing of operations to several individuals. Among them were Lane, dairy scientist and veterinarian William Levi Carlyle, William Elliot, and Alick Newton who served as the executive link between Edward and the ranch.

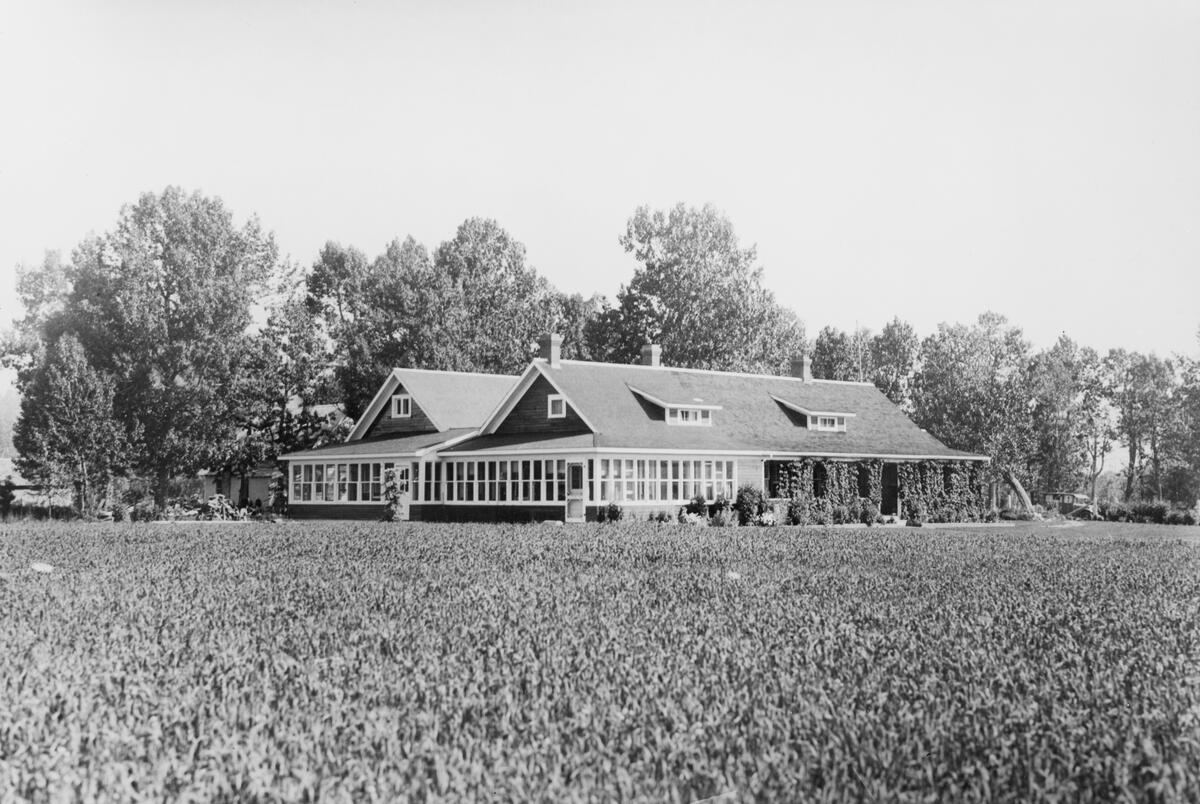
E. P. Ranch Main House (1927)

While removed from the ranch, Edward continued to be involved in its management. In 1920, following consultation with Carlyle, Edward decided to ship thirty head of shorthorn cattle, eight thoroughbred fillies and a stallion, twenty head of selected Dartmoor ponies, and twenty-five head of purebred Shropshire sheep to the ranch to augment its animal holdings. The intention of having a diversity of animals was to produce prize winning show animals. Given this focus, the ranch operated at a small loss each year, typically losing between $2,000 and $5,000.

Over the years extensive improvements were made. In 1919, shortly after purchasing the ranch, four rooms were added to the main building, in addition to a bathroom. In 1923, several more additions were made in anticipation of a visit from Edward. Three new rooms were added, alongside a glazed in porch and modern conveniences. Despite these upgrades, every effort was made to preserve the character of the original structure. In 1927, a substantial enlargement was made via the addition of a new wing to the house which included several additional bedrooms and a formal reception room for receiving guests.

Although Edward was fond of the ranch, he visited only a handful of times, largely due to his royal duties taking priority. However, despite his sporadic visits, he was known to roll up his sleeves and engage in ranch labour when visiting. He also entertained many visitors during his visits to the ranch, including George Harry Webster, R. B. Bennett, Peter Charles Larkin, and Colonel James Walker.

=== Later ownership ===
After owning the E.P. Ranch for 43 years, Edward decided to sell the ranch to Jim Cartwright of the nearby D Ranch. As of 2025 the ranch continues to remain under private ownership.

In 1991, filming for several scenes of the Clint Eastwood film Unforgiven were shot at the E.P. Ranch and featured several of the original buildings.

The E.P. Ranch was designated a provincial historic resource of Alberta in 2004 in recognition of its heritage value and association with Edward VIII.

In 2013, heavy rainfall caused severe flooding in southern Alberta. Pekisko Creek overran its banks and flooded large areas of the ranch, severely damaging several of the buildings. Significant preservation work was undertaken in 2015 to repair the damaged buildings.

== See also ==
- Bar U Ranch
