= George Lane (politician) =

Canadian politician

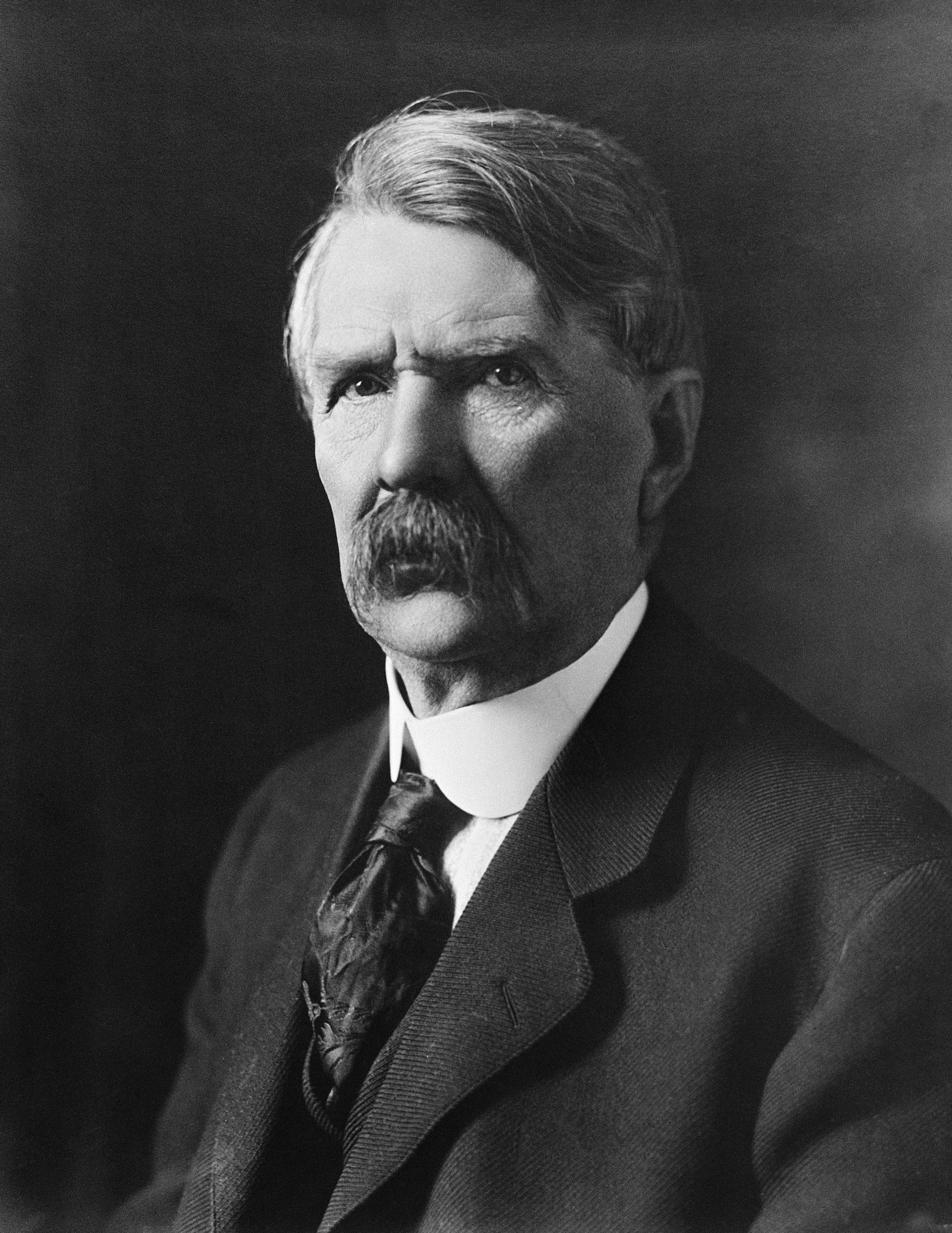

Member of the Legislative Assembly of Alberta for Bow Valley
- In office April 17, 1913 – May 26, 1913
- Preceded by: New District
- Succeeded by: Charles Richmond Mitchell

Personal details
- Born: March 6, 1856 Booneville, Iowa
- Died: September 24, 1925 (aged 69) Bar U Ranch, Alberta
- Party: Liberal
- Spouse: Elizabeth Sexsmith
- Children: 8
- Occupation: Rancher, businessman, politician

George Lane (6 March 1856 – 24 September 1925) was an American-born Canadian rancher, community leader, and known as one of the Big Four who helped found the Calgary Stampede in 1912. In 2016, he was inducted into the Hall of Great Westerners of the National Cowboy & Western Heritage Museum.

Lane was born in Iowa and moved with his family to Virginia City, Montana when he was 16. His father was one of the founders of the Alder Gulch gold mine. In 1874, Lane joined the U.S. Army as a scout and dispatch rider. He carried messages for General Nelson Miles. He left the army and began working for Conrad Kohrs where he honed his skills as a cowboy. In 1884, following the incorporation of the first great corporate ranches in southern Alberta, he was hired by the Allen Family as the first foreman of the Northwest Cattle Company (later known as the Bar U Ranch). According to A. E. Cross, Lane was described as, "A strict autocrat with all cowboys. His word was law and no one disputed it. he was widely known over most of North America, especially in the west, and down into Mexico, even reaching as for as old France."

George Lane was foreman at the Bar U Ranch for seven years and eventually returned in 1902 to purchase it for $250,000. In 1919, he hosted the Edward VIII, then the Prince of Wales, during his Royal Tour of Canada. On Edward's behalf, he executed the purchase of the neighbouring E.P. Ranch. In 1885, he married Elizabeth Sexsmith and they raised eight children together.

In the 1913 Alberta general election, Lane was elected as the first member for the Bow Valley riding for the Alberta Liberal Party. Somewhat of a star candidate for the Liberal Party, he defeated Conservative incumbent Harold Riley, who had changed from the Gleichen district, thereby helping keep a critical southern Alberta seat from going Conservative. He would spend very little time as a member of the Legislative Assembly of Alberta, however, resigning a short time later so that defeated Cabinet Minister Charles R. Mitchell could regain a seat in the legislature.

== Legacy ==
- Hall of Great Westerners, 2016

== Election results ==
1913 Alberta general election: Bow Valley
Party	Candidate	Votes	%
Liberal	George Lane	396	61.78%
Conservative	Harold William Hounsfield Riley	245	38.22%
Total		641	
Source(s) Source: "Bow Valley Official Results 1913 Alberta general election". Alberta Heritage Community Foundation.

Legislative Assembly of Alberta
Preceded by New District	MLA Bow Valley; 1913	Succeeded by Charles R. Mitchell
