= Pancake breakfast =

Public event

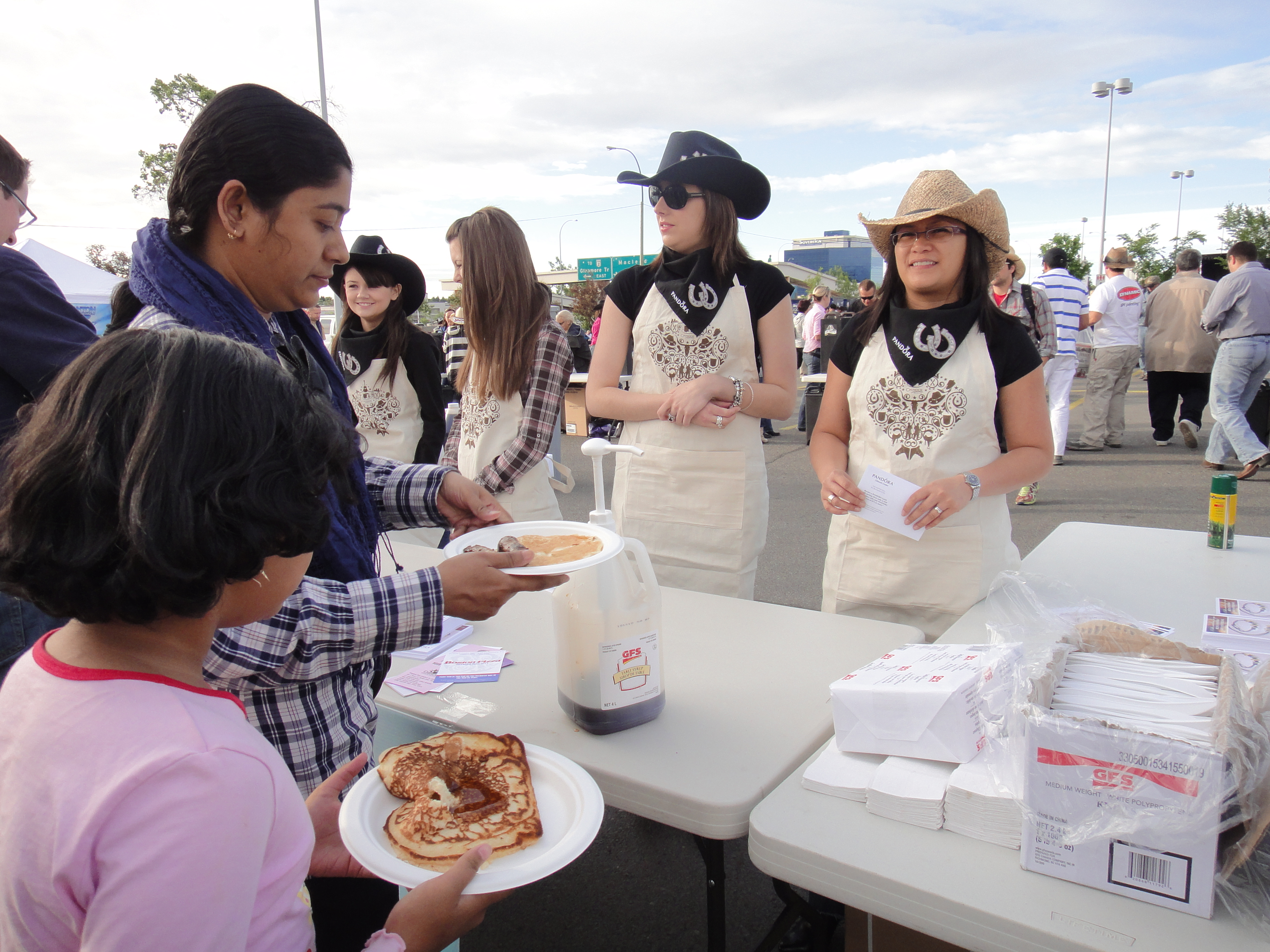
A "syrup station" at the annual pancake breakfast at the Chinook Centre Mall in Calgary, Alberta

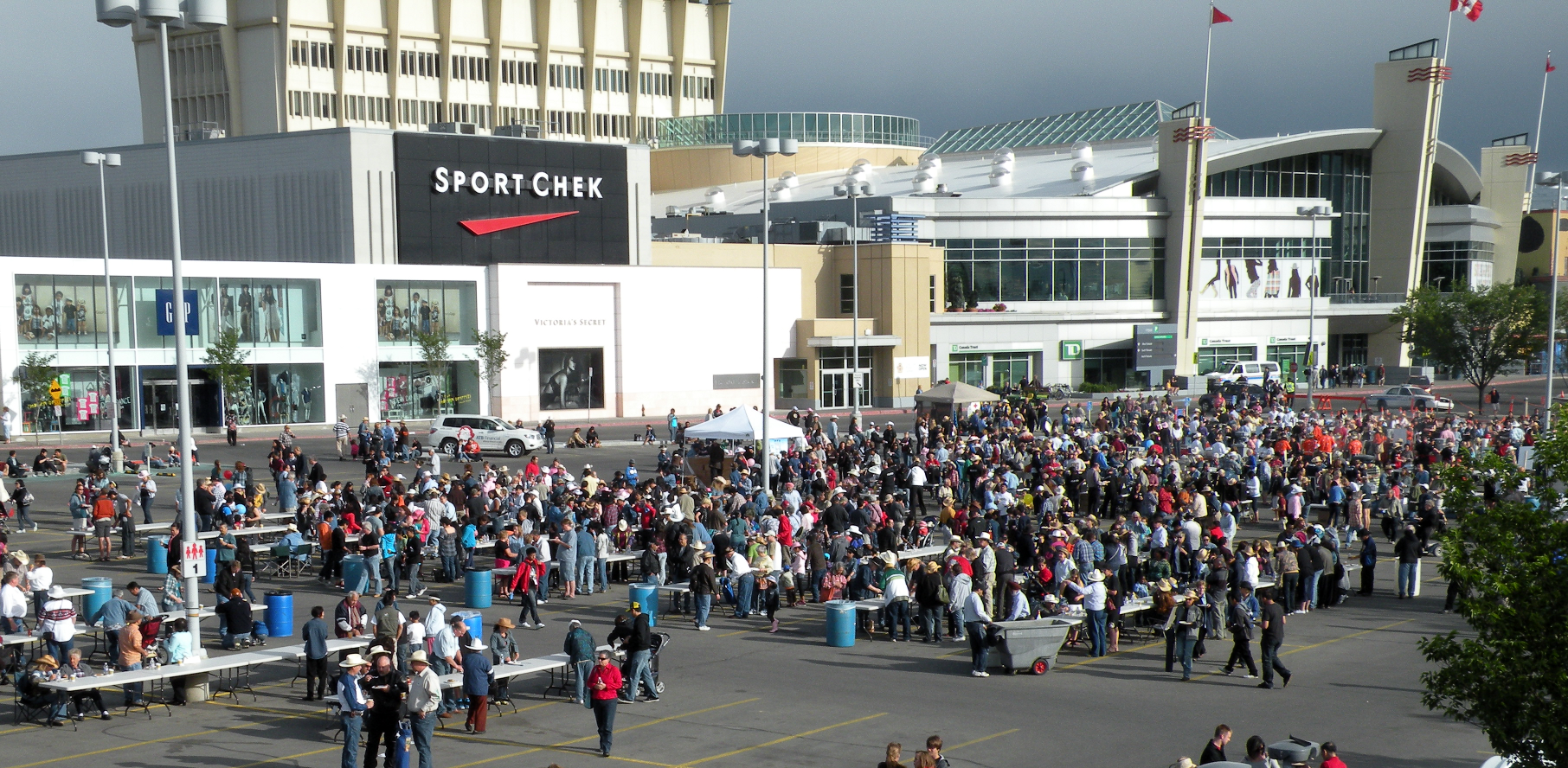
The annual pancake breakfast at the Chinook Centre Mall in Calgary, Alberta feeds over 60,000 in one day. The 2011 event is shown.

A pancake breakfast is a public meal attached to many festivals, religious celebrations, and community events which involves volunteers cooking large quantities of pancakes and other hot breakfast foods for the general public, often for free or for a nominal charge if the event is a fundraiser.

Throughout Christendom, the tradition of pancake breakfasts is carried out on Shrove Tuesday, the last day of Shrovetide and the day preceding the start of the somber season of Lent, as many Christians give up fatty foods as their Lenten sacrifice.

The tradition is especially noted in Western Canada, where it is associated with the region's cattle ranching history.

This mainly Canadian tradition appears to be related to the tradition in the neighboring United States in which various groups use pancake breakfasts as a means to raise funds for schools and charities.

== Alberta ==
In Alberta, Canada, the tradition is also closely associated with the major summer fairs and exhibitions of each town and city, including most famously K-Days in Edmonton, and the Calgary Stampede in that city. The Calgary Stampede, Canada's largest rodeo, had been associated with pancake breakfasts since 1923 when a local rancher began serving pancakes from his camp stove during the festivities to anyone who came by. The tradition soon became for local businesses and charities across Calgary and Edmonton to host breakfasts for their employees, customers, and others during the Stampede and K-Days. Likewise with Westerner Days in Red Deer, etc. Besides the fairs and rodeos, pancakes are also widely served on Canada Day, including at the Alberta Legislature.

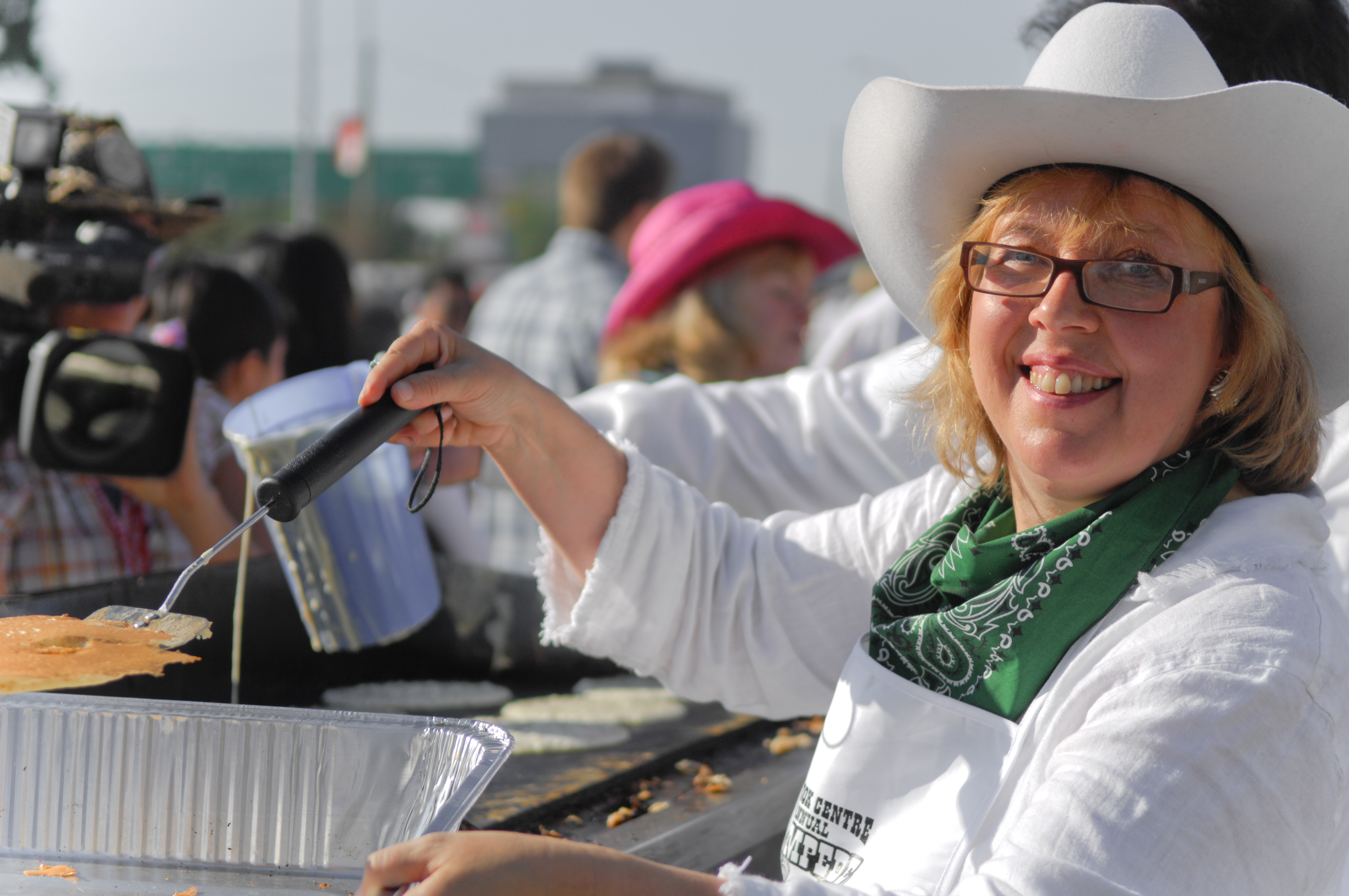
Green Party of Canada leader Elizabeth May at a 2008 Calgary Stampede pancake breakfast

There has also been a long connection between these breakfast events and politics. The Premier of Alberta annually hosts pancake breakfasts at both K-Days and the Calgary Stampede which are frequently attended by many other politicians, keen to be seen by the public at such events. And politicians are also the main volunteers behind the Canada Day breakfast hosted by the Legislative Assembly of Alberta. Likewise, most small town fairs in Alberta feature a pancake breakfast hosted by the mayor and councilors and other local notables. These events are now part of a "barbecue circuit" of summer community events that Canadian politicians are expected to attend.

Over time, the pancake breakfasts associated with the Calgary Stampede have evolved into large affairs in which big international corporate sponsors tried to out do each other and sometime overshadows the smaller breakfasts. Many large deals are sometime made at these breakfasts. More than 100 different breakfasts might be hosted during this time period. Breakfasts at the Stampede is important enough for the Canadian Prime Minister and national leaders of the other important political parties to attend as a server at some of these breakfasts. One of the largest breakfasts is held annually at the Chinook Centre in which 60,000 people are served.

Pancake breakfasts are also closely associated with Canadian football fan culture, especially around the Alberta teams. Both Calgary and Edmonton fan organizations host pancake breakfasts during Grey Cup week festivities each year. The tradition began at the 1948 championship when hundreds of Calgary Stampeders fans descended on Toronto for their team's first appearance in the game. Bringing chuckwagons and horses, the fans organized a Stampede week style pancake breakfast for bewildered Torontonians. According to historian Hugh Dempsey, "[t]he Grey Cup was just another game until Calgary went down to Toronto with chuckwagons and everything and turned it into an event." Free pancake breakfasts are now offered in the Grey Cup host city anytime Calgary is invited to the Grey Cup match.

== See also ==
- List of dining events
- List of pancakes
- Pancake feed a similar, U.S. tradition
