= Joseph Carberry =

Joseph Carberry may refer to:

- Joseph E. Carberry, pioneer aviator
- Joseph Carberry (politician), Wisconsin state representative

== See also ==
- Joey Carbery, Irish rugby union player
- Joe Carbury, rodeo announcer in Calgary, Alberta
