= Patsy Rodgers =

Calgary stampede queen (1926–2020)

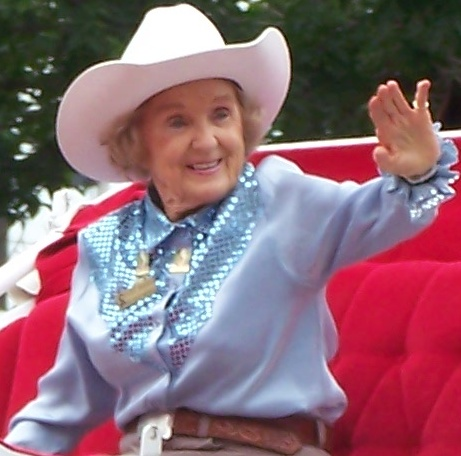
Patsy Rodgers as the parade marshal at the 2008 Calgary Stampede

Patsy Rodgers was the first Stampede Queen of the Calgary Stampede. She became Stampede Queen in 1946 and returned as parade marshal, at age 82, in the 2008 Calgary Stampede parade. Rodgers died in November 2020 at the age of 95.
