= Barbecue circuit =

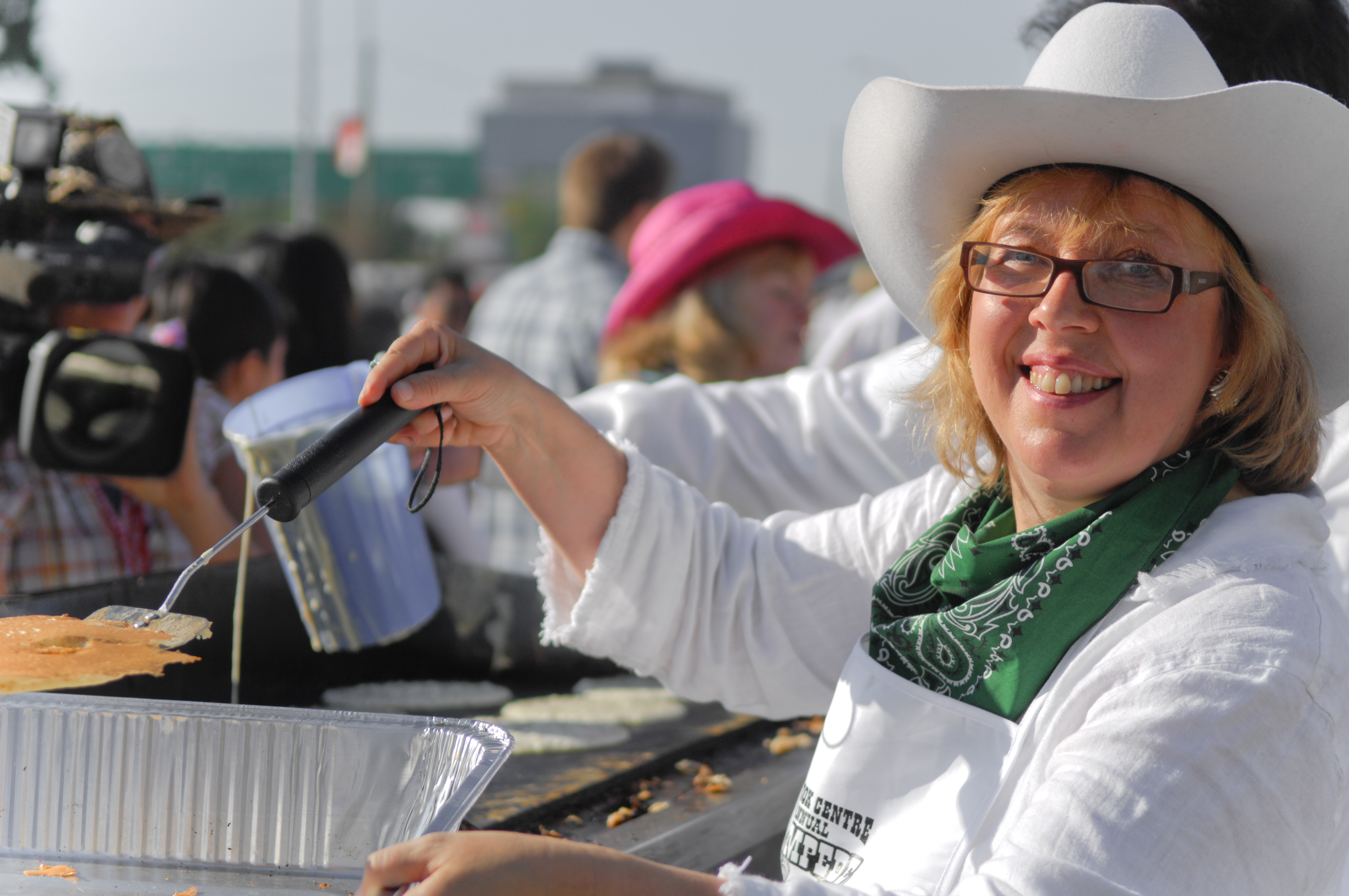
Green Party of Canada leader Elizabeth May at a 2008 Calgary Stampede pancake breakfast.

In Canadian politics, the "summer barbecue and kissing babies circuit" or simply, the barbecue circuit refers to the summer activities of Canadian legislators and politicians during breaks from parliament and the provincial legislatures. This involves attending many community events in order to meet constituents. The term refers to the ubiquity of grilled meat (barbecue) at such gatherings.

The BBQ circuit may seem inconsequential, but there is a reason it happens every year. Though far removed from the demands of governing and of holding a government to account, meeting with voters across the country is an important part of a politician’s job – and a necessity if he or she intends to keep it.

— Eric Grenier, The Huffington Post

Federal Liberal leader Michael Ignatieff was criticized by his own party for taking the 2009 barbecue season off.

In 2011, interim federal Liberal leader Bob Rae visited "P.E.I. for a strawberry social... the Assembly of First Nations gathering in New Brunswick and then the Calgary Stampede."

The 2012 barbecue circuit began in late June with events related to St. Jean Baptiste Day/Fête Nationale events in Quebec. In 2012, federal Opposition Leader Thomas Mulcair visited the Calgary Stampede and was voted the best dressed politician by The Globe and Mail. Also at the 2012 Calgary Stampede, Alberta's rival conservative leaders, Alberta PC Premier Alison Redford, and Wildrose Opposition Leader both attended Prime Minister Harper's barbue party, as did other Canadian conservative legislators included federal and provincial cabinet ministers.
