= Pancake feed =

All-you-can-eat breakfast of pancakes

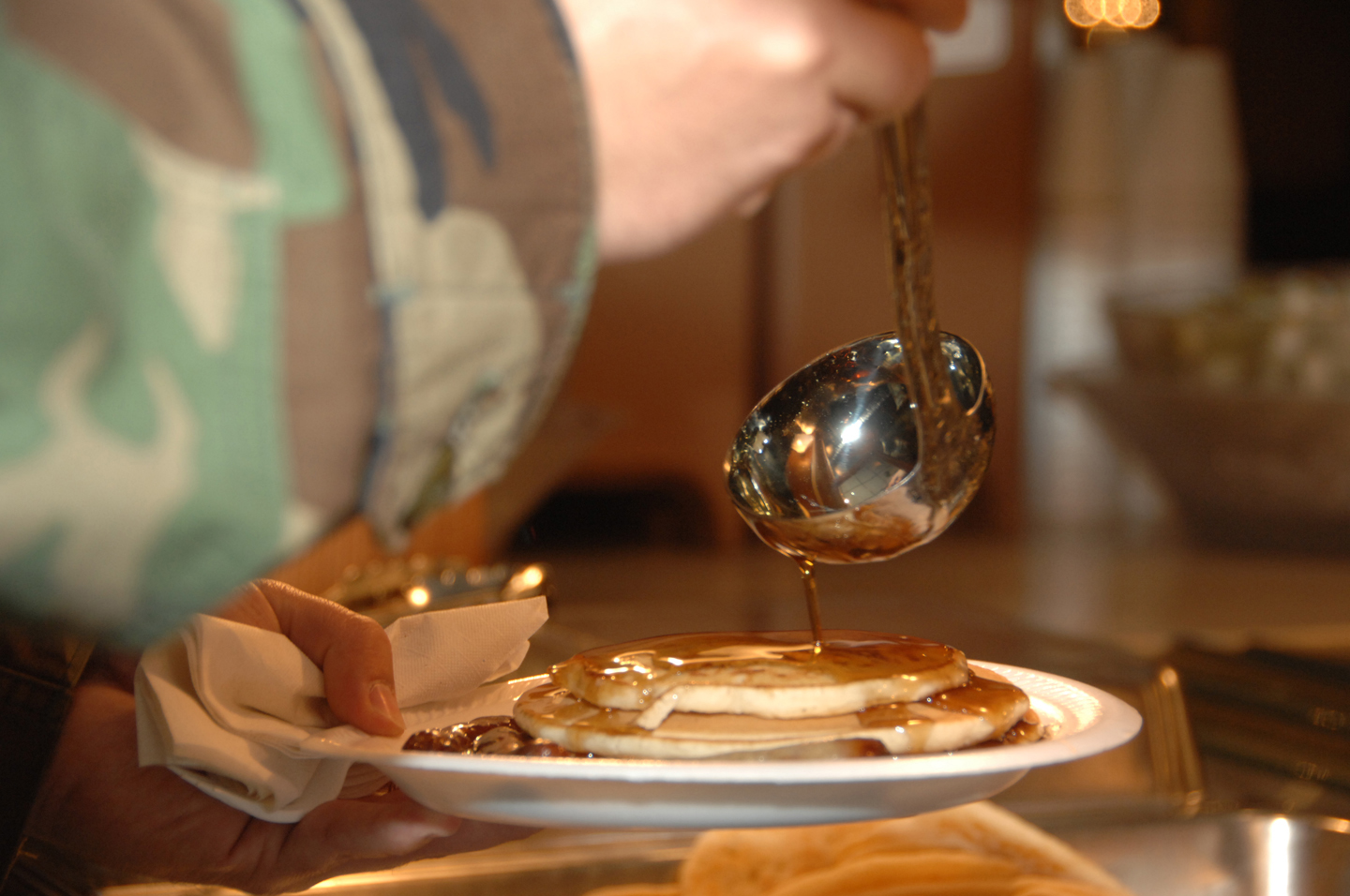
Pancake feed at Offutt Air Force Base in Nebraska

A pancake feed is an all-you-can-eat breakfast of pancakes popular in some United States locales including Minnesota and Nebraska. A record pancake feed serving over 38,000 people occurred in Fargo, North Dakota, on February 9, 2008. American civic groups and amateur sports teams have traditionally used pancake feeds as fundraisers. In Seattle, they are associated with Swedish American and Norwegian American cultural societies and clubs. The Kiwanis pancake feed in Lincoln, Nebraska, has been held continuously since the 1950s.

== See also ==
- Pancake breakfast a similar, Canadian tradition
- Pancake Tuesday a religious institution of feasting on pancakes amongst Lutherans, Catholics and other Christian denominations
