= Joe Carbury =

Canadian radio announcer

Joseph Carbury (né Carrabre; April 4, 1926 – October 17, 2017) was a rodeo announcer in Calgary, Alberta, and one of the most familiar voices of the Calgary area.

Carbury was born in Winnipeg, Manitoba in 1926, with his surname having originally been spelt "Carrabre". He began with radio sports announcing in 1948. After announcing for curling games, the junior hockey team Medicine Hat Tigers, the Edmonton Eskimos and Calgary Stampeders of the Canadian Football League, and for boxing matches, he became most famous through the Calgary Stampede.

Joe Carbury announced the chuckwagon races of the Calgary Stampede from the 1960s until his retirement in 2008. His tagline "And they're OFF..." to start each race is well known in the Calgary area.

He also announced the horse races at Stampede Park from 1953 until horse racing moved out of the park in June 2007. Thus, at 54 years on the job, Carbury had announced for almost half of horse racing's 117-year history at Stampede Park.

He has announced over 1,000 hockey games and over 25,000 horse races.

He was inducted into the Alberta Sport Hall Of Fame in 2003. Carbury died at a Calgary hospital after a stroke, on October 17, 2017. He was 91.

== Sources ==
- Article title
- http://www.canada.com/calgaryherald/news/neighbours/story.html?id=f064b30a-334b-4261-a21a-325a44a86aeb&p=2
