= Calgary Stampede =

Annual rodeo, exhibition, and festival in Canada

Coordinates: 51°02′01″N 114°03′14″W

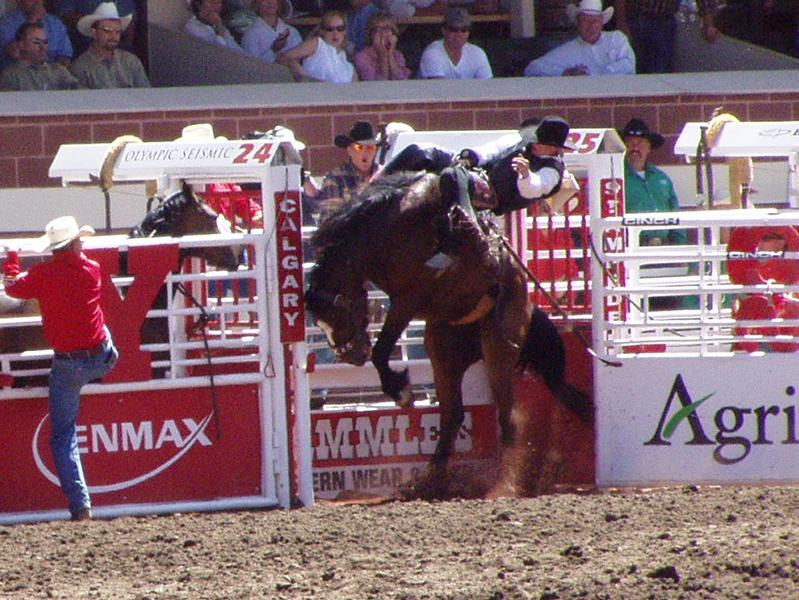
- Bareback bronc rider at the Stampede rodeo
- Genre: Rodeo and fair
- Dates: 10 days, starting the first Friday of July (second Friday if the first Friday is Canada Day or the day after Canada Day) 2027: July 9–18
- Locations: Calgary, Alberta, Canada
- Founded: 1886; 140 years ago (Exhibition); 1912 (Stampede); 1923 (Exhibition and Stampede)
- Attendance: 1,411,954 (2026); 1,477,953 (record – 2024)
- Website: www.calgarystampede.com

The Calgary Stampede (French: Stampede de Calgary) is an annual rodeo, exhibition, and festival held every July in Calgary, Alberta, Canada. The ten-day event, which bills itself as "The Greatest Outdoor Show on Earth", attracts over one million visitors per year and features one of the world's largest rodeos, a parade, midway, stage shows, concerts, agricultural competitions, chuckwagon racing, and First Nations exhibitions. In 2008, the Calgary Stampede was inducted into the ProRodeo Hall of Fame.

The event's roots are traced to 1886 when the Calgary and District Agricultural Society held its first fair. In 1912, American promoter Guy Weadick organized his first rodeo and festival, known as the Stampede. He returned to Calgary in 1919 to organize the Victory Stampede in honour of soldiers returning from World War I. Weadick's festival became an annual event in 1923 when it merged with the Calgary Industrial Exhibition to create the Calgary Exhibition and Stampede.

Organized by thousands of volunteers and supported by civic leaders, the Calgary Stampede has grown into one of the world's richest rodeos, one of Canada's largest festivals, and a significant tourist attraction for the city. Rodeo and chuckwagon racing events are televised across Canada. However, both have been the target of increasing international criticism by animal welfare groups and politicians concerned about particular events as well as animal rights organizations seeking to ban rodeo in general.

Calgary's national and international identity is tied to the event. It is known as the "Stampede City", carries the informal nickname of "Cowtown", and the local Canadian Football League team is called the Stampeders. The city takes on a party atmosphere during Stampede: office buildings and storefronts are painted in cowboy themes, residents don western wear, and events held across the city include hundreds of pancake breakfasts and barbecues.

== History ==
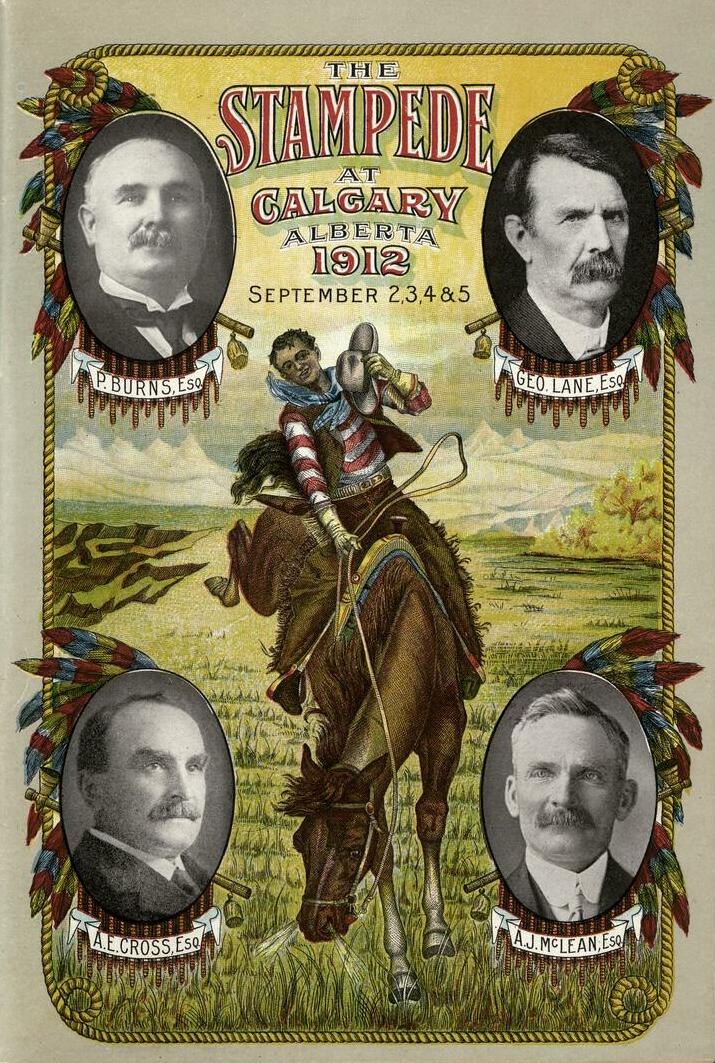
The Program for the 1912 Calgary Stampede featuring the Big Four: Burns, Lane, Cross, and McLean. This poster is part of the collection of the Glenbow Archives.

The Calgary and District Agricultural Society was formed in 1884 to promote the town and encourage farmers and ranchers from eastern Canada to move west. The society held its first fair two years later, attracting a quarter of the town's 2,000 residents. By 1889, it had acquired land on the banks of the Elbow River to host the exhibitions, but crop failures, poor weather, and a declining economy resulted in the society ceasing operations in 1895. The land passed briefly to future Prime Minister R. B. Bennett who sold it to the city. The area was called Victoria Park, after Queen Victoria, and the newly formed Western Pacific Exhibition Company hosted its first agricultural and industrial fair in 1899.

The exhibition grew annually, and in 1908 the Government of Canada announced that Calgary would host the federally funded Dominion Exhibition that year. Seeking to take advantage of the opportunity to promote itself, the city spent C$145,000 to build six new pavilions and a racetrack. It held a lavish parade as well as rodeo, horse racing, and trick roping competitions as part of the event. The exhibition was a success, drawing 100,000 people to the fairgrounds over seven days despite an economic recession that afflicted the city of 25,000.

Guy Weadick, an American trick roper who participated in the Dominion Exhibition as part of the Miller Brothers 101 Ranch Real Wild West Show, returned to Calgary in 1912 in the hopes of establishing an event that more accurately represented the "wild west" than the shows he was a part of. He initially failed to sell civic leaders and the Calgary Industrial Exhibition on his plans, but with the assistance of local livestock agent H. C. McMullen, Weadick convinced businessmen Pat Burns, George Lane, A. J. McLean, and A. E. Cross to put up $100,000 to guarantee funding for the event. The Big Four, as they came to be known, viewed the project as a final celebration of their life as cattlemen. The city built a rodeo arena on the fairgrounds and over 100,000 people attended the six-day event in September 1912 to watch hundreds of cowboys from Western Canada, the United States, and Mexico compete for $20,000 in prizes. The event generated $120,000 in revenue and was hailed as a success.

Weadick set about planning the 1913 Stampede, promoting the event across North America. However, the Big Four were not interested in hosting another such event. Businessmen in Winnipeg convinced Weadick to host his second Stampede in their city, but the show failed financially. A third attempt held in New York State in 1916 suffered the same fate. Weadick returned to Calgary in 1919 where he gained the support of E. L. Richardson, the general manager of the Calgary Industrial Exhibition. The two convinced numerous Calgarians, including the Big Four, to back the "Great Victory Stampede" in celebration of Canada's soldiers returning from World War I.

=== Calgary Exhibition and Stampede ===
While the 1919 Stampede was successful, it was again held as a one-time event. Richardson was convinced that it could be a profitable annual event but found little support for the concept within the board of directors of the Calgary Industrial Exhibition. However, declining attendance and mounting financial losses forced the exhibition board to reconsider Richardson's proposals at their 1922 annual meeting. Richardson proposed merging the two events on a trial basis. Weadick agreed, and the union created the Calgary Exhibition and Stampede.

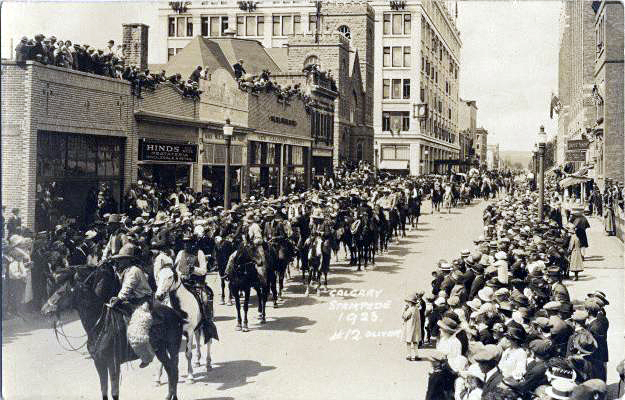
1923 Stampede parade

The combined event was first held in 1923. Weadick encouraged the city's residents to dress in western clothes and decorate their businesses in the spirit of the "wild west". Civic leaders truly supported the event for the first time: Mayor George Webster followed the costume suggestion and allowed downtown roads to be closed for two hours each morning of the six-day event to accommodate street parties. The new sport of chuckwagon racing was introduced and proved immediately popular. 138,950 people attended and the event earned a profit. Over 167,000 people attended in 1924 and the success guaranteed that the Stampede and Exhibition would be held together permanently.

Attendance grew annually throughout the 1920s, peaking at 258,496 in 1928, but the onset of the Great Depression resulted in attendance declines and financial losses. After consecutive years of losses in 1930 and 1931, the exhibition board was forced to make cutbacks, a decision that strained the relationship between the board and Weadick. Furthering the divide was Weadick's growing resentment of the board's control of what he considered his event. The issue came to a head in 1932 when Weadick and Richardson engaged in a loud argument over the situation, ending with Weadick's threat to quit entirely. One month later, the exhibition board announced that it had relieved him of his duties. Angered by the decision, Weadick sued the exhibition board for $100,000, citing breach of contract and unfair dismissal. His claim was upheld in courts, but he was awarded only $2,750 plus legal fees. Embittered by the events, Weadick remained at odds with the board for 20 years until he was invited to the 1952 Stampede as an honoured guest and parade marshal.

At least seven movies were filmed at the Stampede by 1950. The most profitable, the 1925 silent film The Calgary Stampede, used footage from the rodeo and exposed people across North America to the event. Hollywood stars and foreign dignitaries were attracted to the Stampede; Bob Hope and Bing Crosby each served as parade marshals during the 1950s, while Queen Elizabeth II and Prince Philip made their first of two visits to the event as part of their 1959 tour of Canada. The Queen also opened the 1973 Stampede.

=== Expansion ===
The discovery of the Leduc No. 1 oil well in 1946 and major reserves in the Turner Valley area southwest of the city ushered in a period of growth and prosperity. Calgary was transformed from an agricultural community into the oil and gas capital of Canada. The city's population nearly doubled between 1949 and 1956, and Calgary's immigrant population not only embraced the Stampede, but encouraged friends and family in their home towns to do the same. The 1950s represented the golden age of the Calgary Stampede.

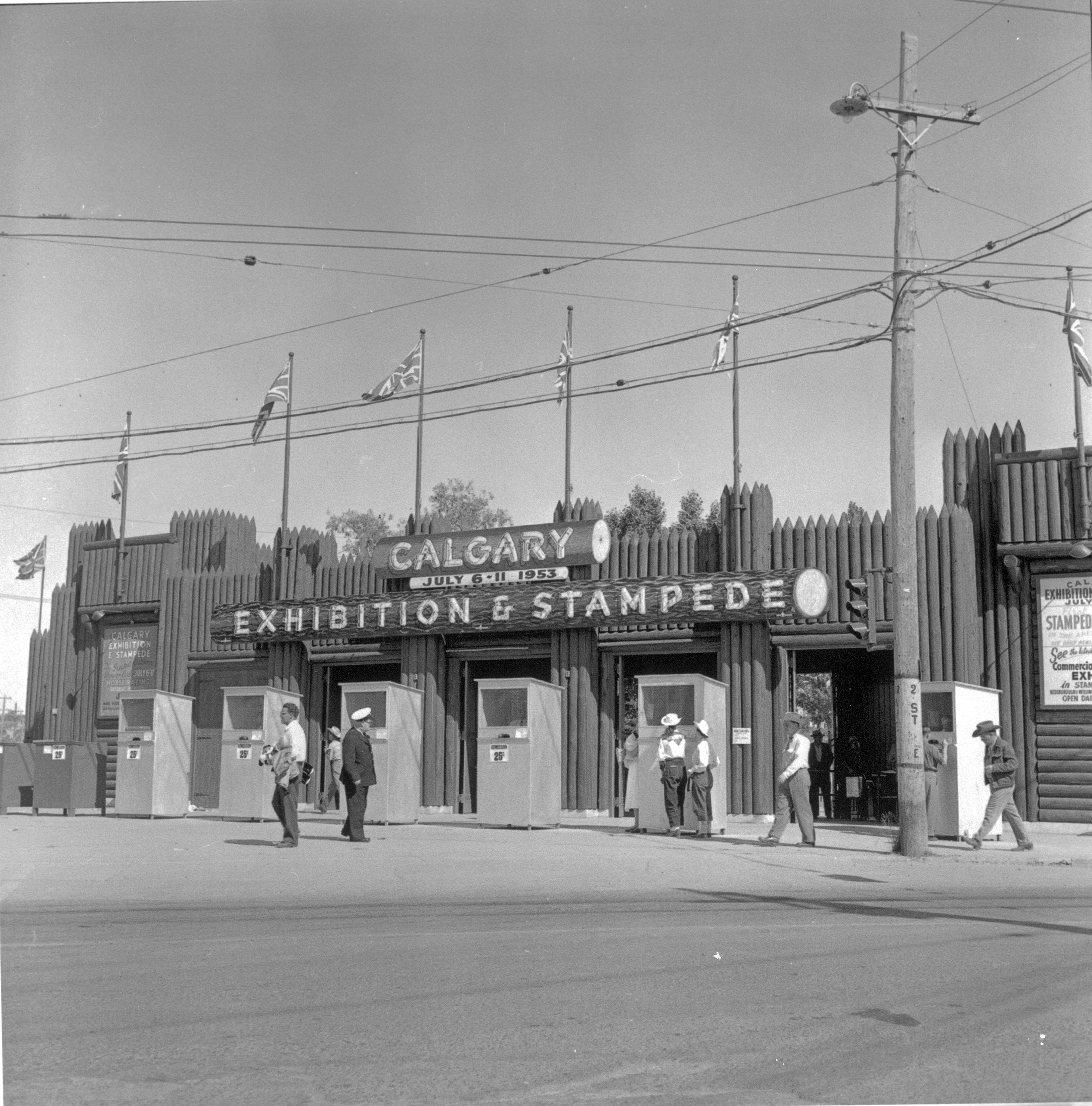
Stampede grounds, 1953

Attendance records were broken nearly every year in the 1950s and overall attendance increased by 200,000 from 1949 to 1959. The growth necessitated expansion of the exhibition grounds. The 7,500-seat Stampede Corral was completed in 1950 as the largest indoor arena in Western Canada. It housed the Calgary Stampeders hockey team, which was operated by the Board of Governors and won the Western Hockey League championship in 1954. Acts such as the Minneapolis Symphony Orchestra and Louis Armstrong played the Corral, although the arena's poor acoustics were a frequent concern to organizers and patrons.

Improvements were made to the grandstand and the race track was rebuilt in 1954. The Big Four Building, named in honour of the Stampede's benefactors, opened in 1959 to serve as the city's largest exhibition hall in the summer, and was converted into a 24-sheet curling facility each winter. The improvements failed to alleviate all the pressures growth had caused: chronic parking shortages and inability to accommodate demand for tickets to the rodeo and grandstand shows continued.

Attendance continued to grow throughout the 1960s and 1970s, topping 500,000 for the first time in 1962 and reaching 654,000 in 1966. Organizers expanded the event from six days to nine in 1967 and then to ten the following year. The Stampede exceeded one million visitors for the first time in 1976. The park, meanwhile, continued to grow. The Round-Up Centre opened in 1979 as the new exhibition hall, and the Olympic Saddledome was completed in 1983. The Saddledome replaced the Corral as the city's top sporting arena, and both facilities hosted hockey and figure skating events at the 1988 Winter Olympics.

Maintaining the traditional focus on agriculture and western heritage remained a priority for the Calgary Stampede as the city grew into a major financial and oil hub in Western Canada. "Aggie Days", a program designed to introduce urban schoolchildren to agriculture was introduced in 1989 and proved immediately popular. A ten-year expansion plan called Horizon 2000 was released in 1990 detailing plans to grow Stampede Park into a year-round destination for Calgarians; an updated plan was released in 2004. The Calgary Exhibition and Stampede organization dropped the word "exhibition" from its title in 2007, and has since been known simply as the Calgary Stampede. Attendance has plateaued around 1.2 million since 2000, however the Stampede set an attendance record of 1,409,371 while celebrating its centennial anniversary in 2012.

=== Flooding ===
Severe flooding in Calgary two weeks before the July 5 opening of the 2013 Stampede caused significant damage to the grounds. Stampede officials promised, however, that the event would be staged as planned. Some of the main events, and all concerts, scheduled for the Saddledome were cancelled due to flood damage to the facility, while other events were relocated to other locations.

=== COVID-19 pandemic ===
On April 23, the 2020 Stampede was cancelled for the first time in over a century due to the COVID-19 pandemic. Community-oriented events held in compliance with Alberta public health orders were organized on the original dates of the Stampede, including pop-up drive-throughs offering pancakes and midway food staples, and maintaining the event's fireworks show. The cancellation made a significant economic impact, as recent editions had contributed $540 million to the province's economy.

In April 2021, Alberta's chief medical officer of health Deena Hinshaw projected that the province could lift some of its restrictions on gatherings by late-June, while Premier Jason Kenney stated that the province could begin doing so once at least two thirds of its residents have been vaccinated. However, soon afterwards, the province began to enact stricter public health orders to control a major ongoing wave of infections. On May 14, the Stampede announced that it did plan to hold an in-person event for 2021, but that the structure of the event would have to be "very different" to comply with whatever public health orders will be in effect by then. On May 26, the Alberta government announced a revised "Open for Summer" plan for easing public health orders, which would allow the majority of restrictions to be lifted two weeks after 70% of eligible residents receive at least one vaccine dose (provided that hospitalizations continue to decline). It was later announced that restrictions would be fully lifted on July 1.

Despite the lifting of public health restrictions, measures such as social distancing would still be encouraged, and the capacity of Stampede Park would therefore be controlled. There would be pre-purchased entry to the grounds and reduced capacity for events. Citing that participants would not have enough time to prepare for the Stampede on short notice due to other chuckwagon racing events leading up to it being cancelled, the Rangeland Derby was cancelled for the second year in a row. Admission to Nashville North (which would be an open-air stage rather than a tent) required proof of vaccination or a negative rapid test. As the Mayor of Calgary did not issue a permit for it to occur on public streets, the Stampede parade was downsized and held as a broadcast-only event within Stampede Park, with no public spectators admitted. To compensate for the cancellation of the Rangeland Derby, bronc riding events were added to the rodeo's evening sessions.

The decision to go on with the Stampede was met with mixed reactions, including concerns that it could become a superspreading event because Alberta's reopening criteria were based only on the first vaccine dose and not being fully vaccinated. There was also criticism from the chuckwagon racing community over the cancellation of the Rangeland Derby. On July 27, Alberta Health Services stated that it had only officially attributed 71 cases of COVID-19 to the Stampede, out of a total attendance of 528,998.

== Events ==
=== Parade ===
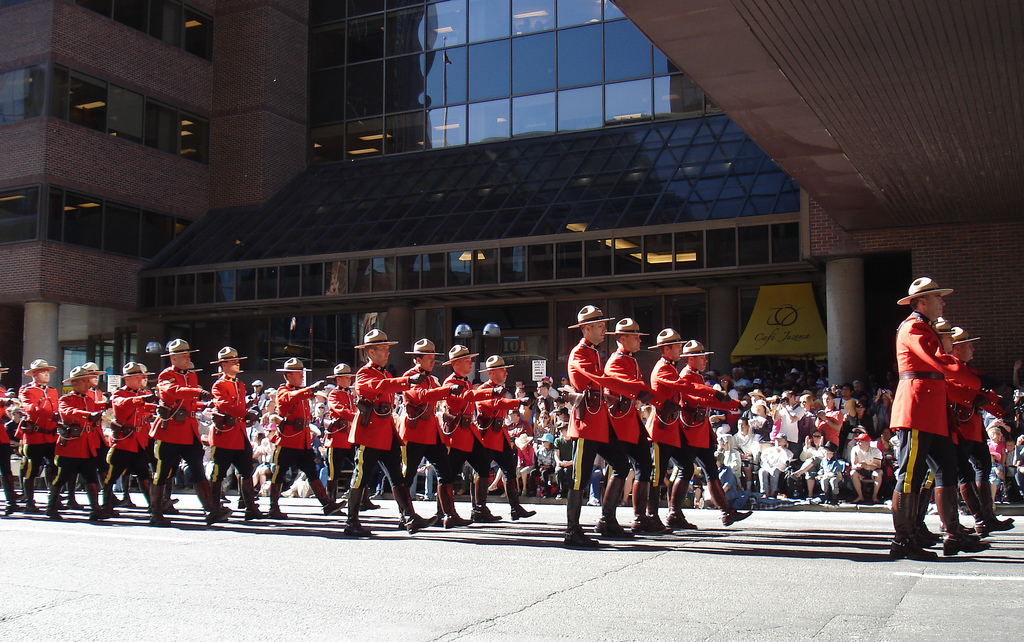
RCMP members in the Stampede Parade

The parade serves as the official opening of the Stampede and begins shortly before 9 a.m. on the first Friday of the event. Each year features a different parade marshal, chosen to reflect the public's interests at that time. Politicians, athletes, actors and other dignitaries have all served as marshals. The event features dozens of marching bands, over 150 floats and hundreds of horses with entrants from around the world, and combines western themes with modern ones. Cowboys, First Nations dancers and members of the Royal Canadian Mounted Police in their red serges are joined by clowns, bands, politicians and business leaders. The first Stampede parade, held in 1912, was attended by 75,000 people, greater than the city's population at the time. As many as 350,000 people attended the parade in 2009, while the presence of Prince William and Catherine, Duke and Duchess of Cambridge, at the 2011 parade as part of their tour of Canada increased attendance to a record estimate of 425,000.

The parade was downsized and closed to the public in 2021 due to the COVID-19 pandemic.

=== Rodeo ===
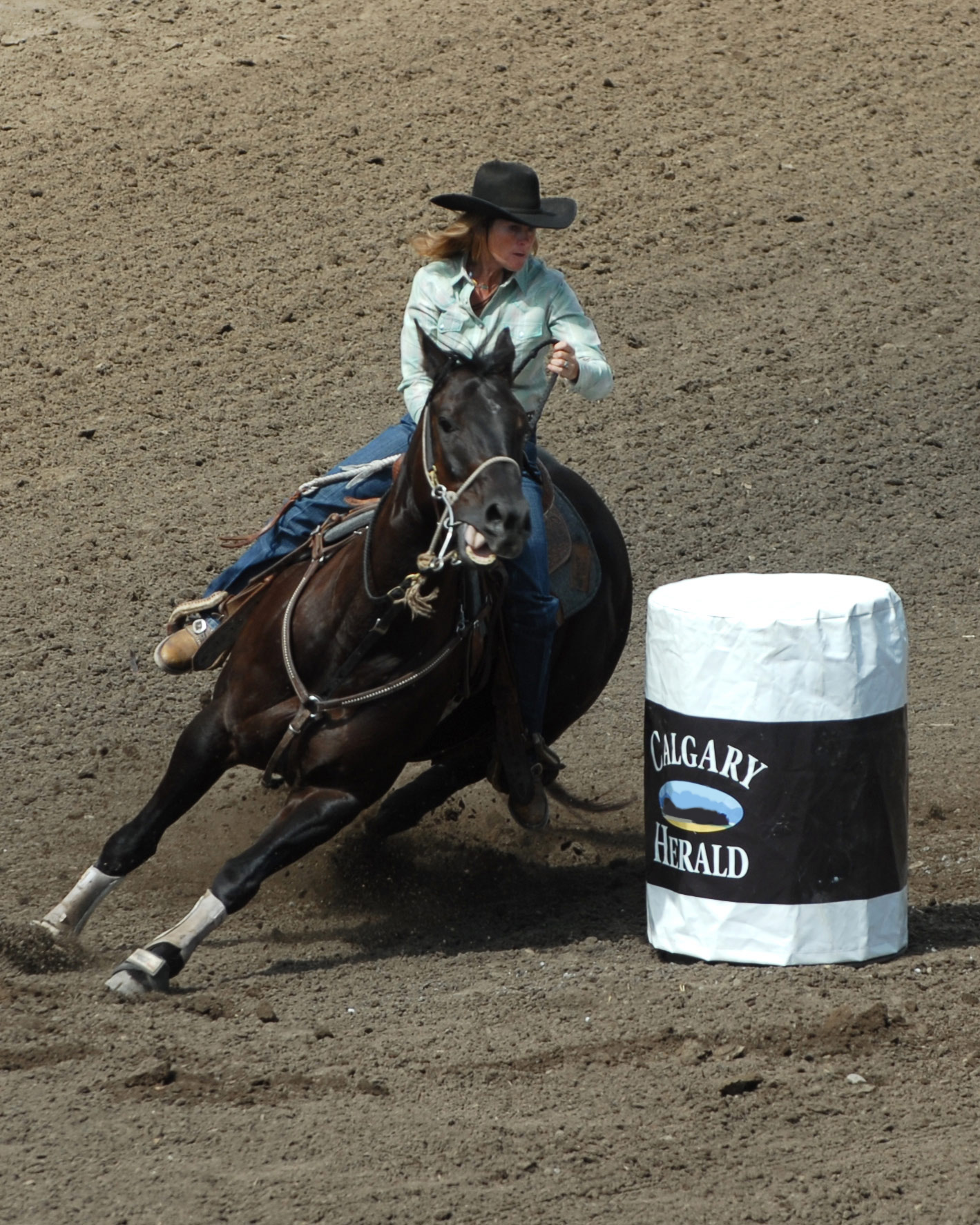
A cowgirl races around a barrel

The rodeo is a central focus of the Calgary Stampede. It is one of the largestevents of its kind in the world. With a prize of $100,000 to the winner of each discipline and $1,000,000 total on championship day alone, it offers significant payouts to event winners. Cowboys consider performing in front of over 20,000 fans daily to be a highlight of the rodeo season.

There are seven major disciplines – bull riding, barrel racing, steer wrestling, breakaway roping, tie down roping, saddle bronc and bareback riding – and four novice events – junior steer riding, novice bareback, novice saddle bronc and wild pony racing. Each event is organized as its own tournament, and the cowboys and girls are divided into two pools. The first pool competes each night for the first four nights, and the second each night for four nights following. The top four in each pool advance to the Sunday final, and the remainder compete on Saturday for a wild card spot in the final. The competitor with the best time or score on Sunday wins the $100,000 grand prize.

Most livestock for the rodeo events come from the 22,000-acre (89 km^{2}) Stampede Ranch located near the town of Hanna. The ranch was created in 1961 as a means of improving the quality of bucking horses and bulls and to guarantee supply. The first of its kind in North America, the Stampede Ranch operates a breeding program that produces some of the top rodeo stock in the world and supplies rodeos throughout southern Alberta, and as far south as Las Vegas.

=== Rangeland Derby ===
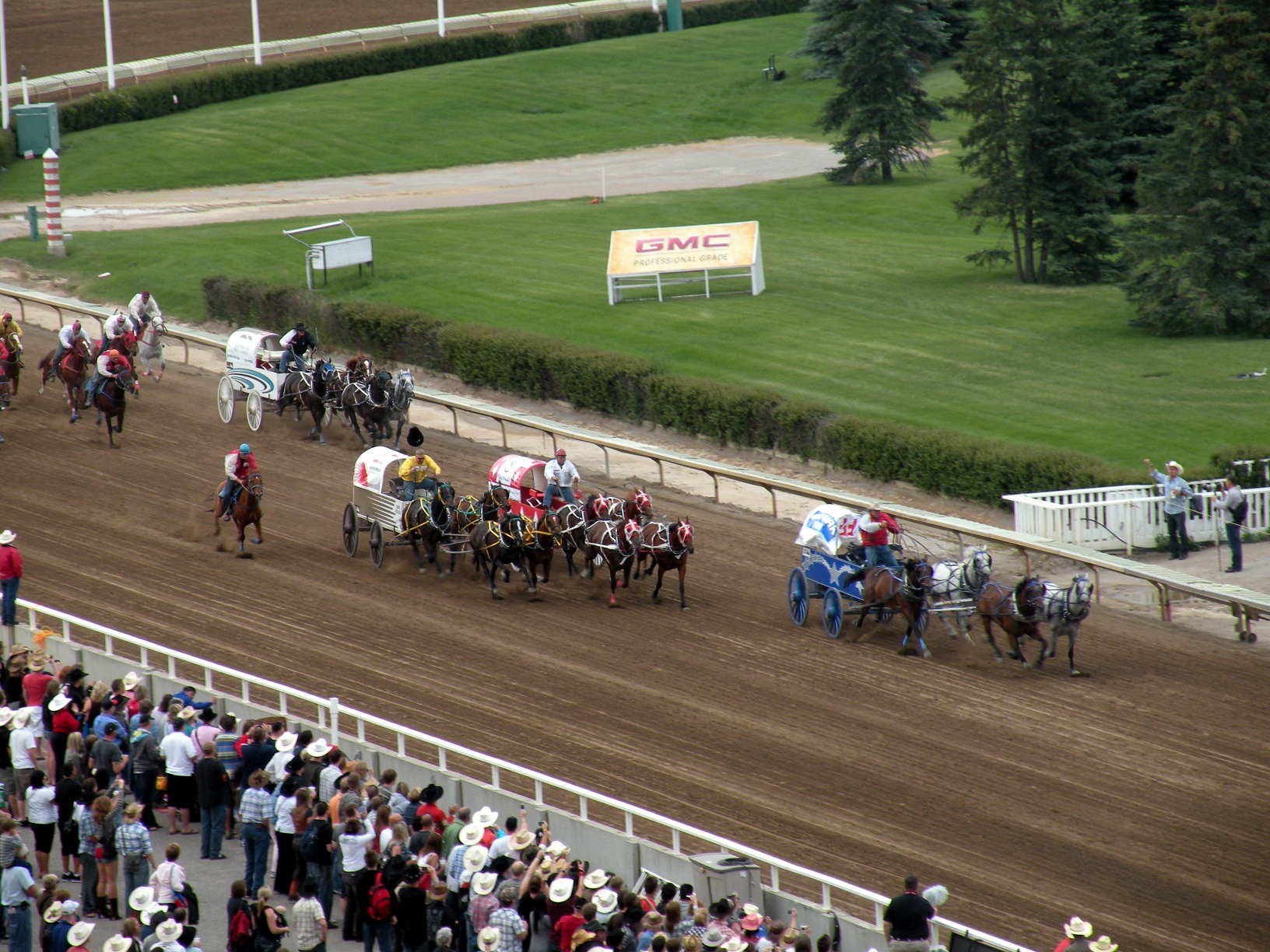
Chuckwagon races are a popular attraction.

Weadick is credited with inventing the sport of chuckwagon racing in 1923, inspired either by seeing a similar event in 1922 at the Gleichen Stampede or watching impromptu races as he grew up. He devised the sport to be a new and exciting event for the newly joined Exhibition and Stampede. Weadick invited ranchers to enter their wagons and crews to compete for a total of $275 in prize money.

Officially called the Rangeland Derby, and nicknamed the "half-mile of hell" or the "dash for cash", chuckwagon racing proved immediately popular and quickly became the event's largest attraction. While only six teams raced in 1923, today's Rangeland Derby consists of 27 teams from either the Canadian Professional Chuckwagon Association, or the World Professional Chuckwagon Association competing for $1.15 million in prize money. Joe Carbury was the voice of the Rangeland Derby for 45 years, until 2008. His distinctive voice and signature phrase of "and they're offfffffff!" to announce the start of a race made him a local legend, and earned him induction into the Alberta Sports Hall of Fame in 2003.

The chuckwagon drivers auction advertising space on their wagons before each year's Stampede. The first advertisement on the tarp cover of a chuckwagon was made in 1941, and Lloyd Nelson was the last person to win the Rangeland Derby without a sponsored wagon, doing so in 1956. The current practice of selling advertising via a tarp auction began in 1979. The revenue generated by the auctions is considered an indicator of the strength of Calgary's economy.

The Rangeland Derby was cancelled in 2020 and 2021 due to the COVID-19 pandemic.

=== Exhibition ===
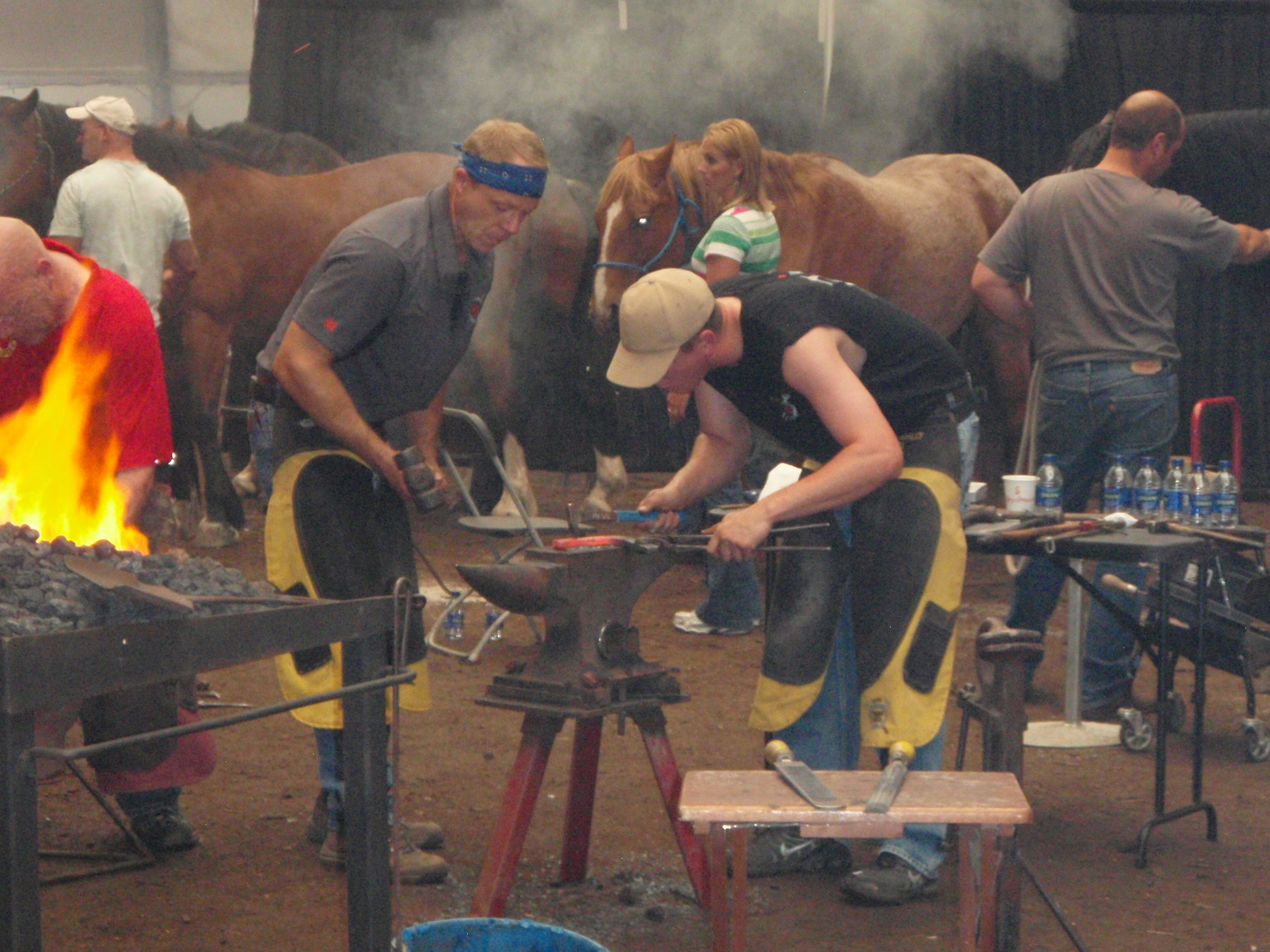
Blacksmiths demonstrate their skills at the 2010 championship

When the agricultural exhibition was first launched in 1886, Alberta was an overwhelmingly rural province. Today, agricultural producers make up less than two percent of the province's population, but the exhibition remains an integral part of the Calgary Stampede. Nearly 70% of all Stampede visitors visit the Agriculture Zone for the displays and demonstrations as well as western events. Numerous competitions are held as part of the exhibition. The American National Cutting Horse Association sanctions a World Series of Cutting event, and the World Championship Blacksmith Competition used to be held, attracting top blacksmiths from around the world. Farm and ranch demonstrations feature numerous breeds of livestock along with stock dog trials and team penning competitions.

Additionally, the exhibition serves to educate the public about Alberta's ranching and agricultural heritage along with modern food production displays through events like Ag-tivity in the city. The Stampede works with Alberta 4-H clubs to encourage youth participation in agricultural pursuits.

=== Midway ===
The Calgary Stampede midway has been operated by North American Midway Entertainment, and its predecessor Conklin Shows, since 1976. The midway is the only part of the event operated on a for-profit basis. It is considered an essential component of the Stampede, but is separate from the predominantly western theme. The midway opens on the Thursday night before other events begin, known as "sneak-a-peek" night. In addition to the traditional rides and carnival games, the midway features four concert areas. Nashville North, a large party tent, made its debut in 1993 as a country music venue. It was followed one-year later by what is now known as the Coca-Cola Stage that offers music acts across a variety of genres. The Saddledome hosts headlining acts, including Garth Brooks and The Beach Boys, who were booked for the Stampede's 100th anniversary in 2012. In 2018, the Stampede's newest concert venue, The Big Four Roadhouse, opened for Stampede-time and year-round events.

=== Market ===
The Stampede Market is located in the BMO Centre on the northwest corner of the park. It offers 38,000 square metres (410,000 sq ft) of retail space and in 2019 began highlighting local artisans. The Western Oasis, a subsection of the market, offers cowboy and western-themed artwork, bronze statues, craftwork, foods and wine. Lured by the opportunity to show their wares to the one million people who attend the Stampede, some vendors wait years before gaining admittance, and those that do consider it one of the prime events of the year.

== Stampede Park ==
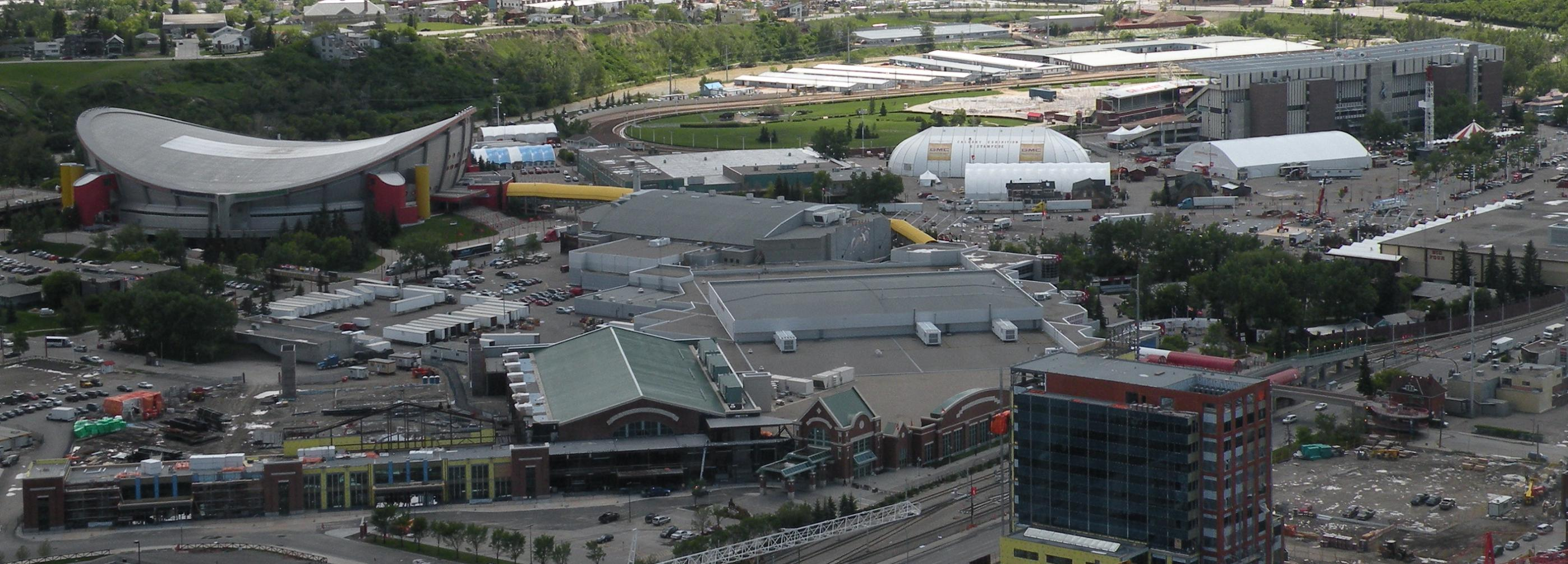
Stampede Grounds as seen from the Calgary Tower. The Saddledome is on the left, and the race track and grandstand are in the distance to the right.

Stampede Park is located southeast of Downtown Calgary in the Beltline District and is serviced by Calgary Transit's light rail system. Permanent structures at the site include the Saddledome, Big Four Building, BMO Centre – a convention and exhibition facility – Cowboys Casino, the Stampede Grandstand, the agriculture building, and a number of facilities that support the exhibition and livestock shows.

The park remains at its original location, though attempts were made to relocate. In 1964, the Stampede Board made plans to purchase former military land (Currie Barracks) in southwest Calgary near Glenmore Trail and 24 Street and relocate the park there. A fully developed plan was released in 1965, and while it had the support of the civic and federal governments, intense opposition from nearby residents quashed the proposal. Space concerns remained a constant issue, and a new plan to push northward into the Victoria Park community beginning in 1968 initiated a series of conflicts with the neighbourhood and city council that persisted for decades.

While Victoria Park fell into steady decline, it was not until 2007 that the final buildings were removed, paving the way for both an expansion of Stampede Park and an urban renewal program for the area. With the land finally secured, the Stampede organization embarked on a $400-million expansion that is planned to feature a new retail and entertainment district, an urban park, a new agricultural arena and potentially a new hotel. The expansion was originally planned to be complete by 2011, but delays and an economic downturn have pushed the expected completion of the project back to 2014.

Stampede Park has long been a central gathering place for Calgarians and tourists. In addition to attendance at the Calgary Stampede, over 2.5 million people attend other sporting events, concerts, trade shows and meetings on a grounds that hosts over 1,000 events annually.

== People ==
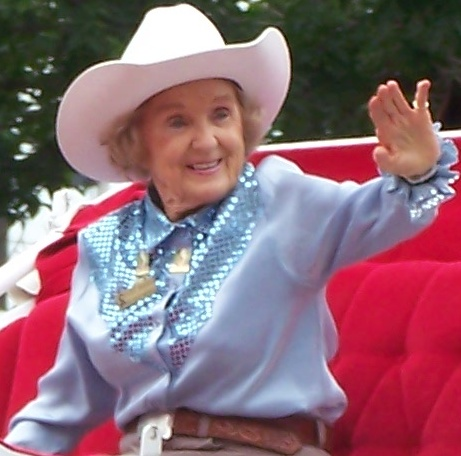
Patsy Rodgers was the first Stampede Queen in 1946 and is seen here as the 2008 Stampede Parade marshal.

Each year, a queen and two princesses are selected as Stampede royalty. They are chosen via a contest open to any woman between the ages of 19 and 24 who resides in Alberta. An emphasis is placed on horsemanship skills and ability to serve as ambassadors for both the Stampede and the city. The first Stampede Queen, Patsy Rodgers, was selected in 1946 while the princesses were first chosen the following year. The royal trio serve one-year terms during which they will make hundreds of appearances throughout southern Alberta and across North America. They then become members of the Calgary Stampede Queens' Alumni Association, founded in 1971. The association organizes fundraisers and events in support of organizations that work with special needs children.

=== First Nations participation ===
During each Stampede, the five nations of the Treaty 7–the Tsuu T'ina, Piikani, Stoney, Kainai and Siksika–create a camp on the bank of the Elbow River in the southern section of Stampede Park, originally known as the Indian Village, but renamed Elbow River Camp in 2018. They erect tipis, organize pow wows, offer arts and crafts, and re-enact elements of their traditional lifestyle. Each year, an Indian Princess is selected from one of the five nations to represent the Treaty 7 as part of the Stampede's royalty. The village is among the Stampede's most popular attractions.

First Nations people had been frequent participants in the city's exhibitions since they were first held in 1886, taking part in parades and sporting events and entertaining spectators with traditional dances. By 1912 however, pressure from agents of the Department of Indian Affairs to suppress their historic traditions and to keep them on their farms nearly ended native participation. Weadick hoped to include native people as a feature of his Stampede, but Indian Affairs opposed his efforts and asked the Duke of Connaught, Canada's Governor General, to support their position. The Duke refused, and after Weadick gained the support of political contacts in Ottawa, including future Prime Minister R. B. Bennett, the path was cleared.

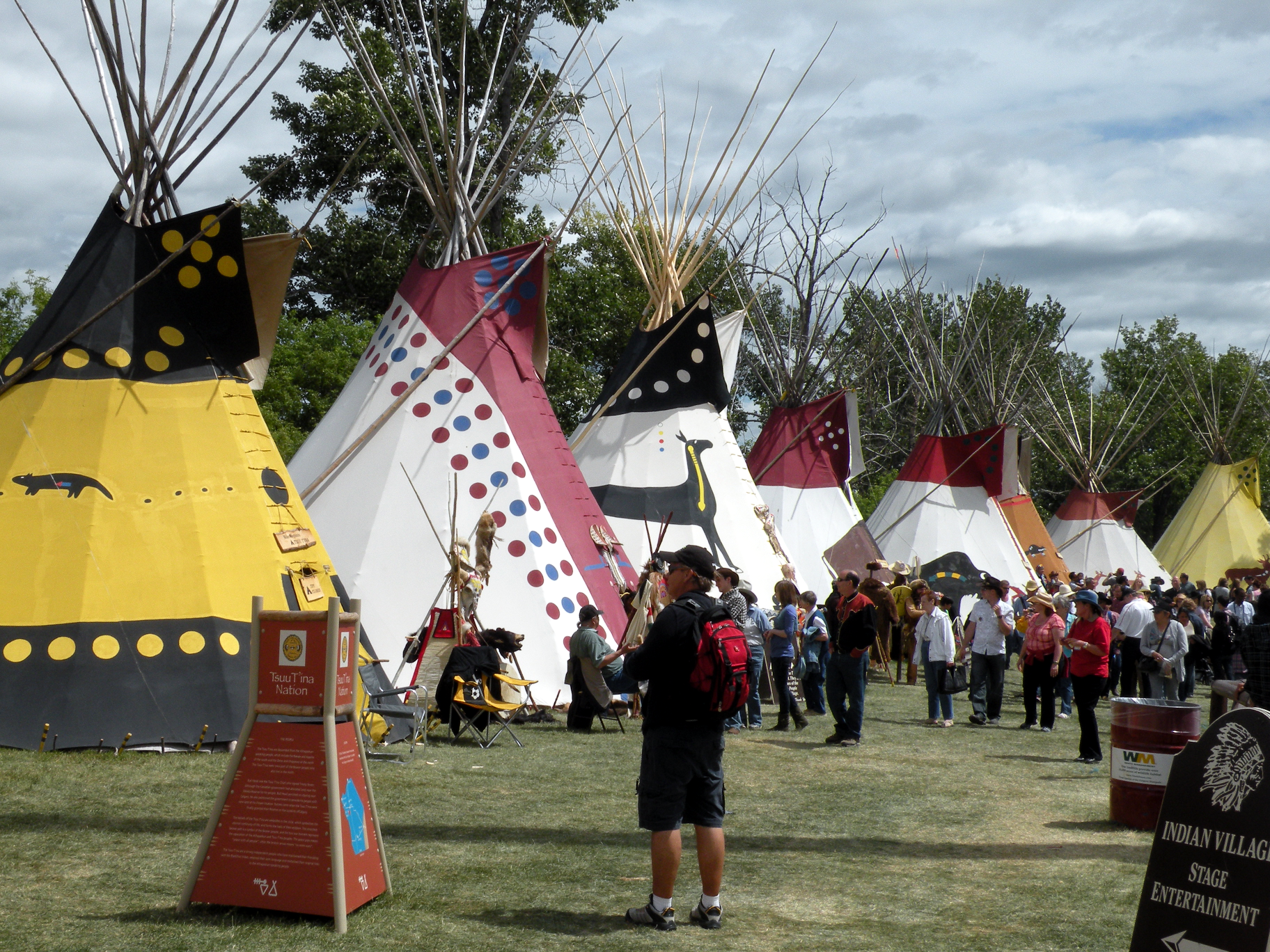
Tipis at the Elbow River Camp

Hundreds of Indigenous peoples, representing six tribes, participated at the 1912 Stampede. They camped in tipis and wore their finest traditional regalia, making them among the most popular participants in the parade. Tom Three Persons, of the Blood (Kainai) tribe, emerged as one of the Stampede's first heroes, amazing spectators with a winning performance in the saddle bronc competition. He was the only Canadian champion of the first Stampede and became the first person to successfully ride Cyclone, a notorious horse that had thrown over 100 riders during its career.

The federal government of Prime Minister Borden attempted to prevent a repeat occurrence, modifying the Indian Act in 1914 to make it illegal for Indigenous peoples to participate in fairs or parades without permission from the local Indian Agent. The new law ended native participation in the Calgary Exhibition, but when Weadick returned in 1919, he successfully fought for their return to the fairgrounds. The Indian Affairs Department under the government of Prime Minister Mackenzie King attempted again to ban native participation in 1925 without success. While conflicts between the Stampede and Indian Affairs continued until 1932, the Indian Village remained, and has remained, a staple on the grounds.

First Nations members and the Stampede board have occasionally met with conflict. The original location of the Indian Village was on low-lying ground that frequently flooded, a problem that was not resolved until 1974 when the village was moved. Complaints about low appearance fees paid to tipi owners, lack of input on committees related to their participation and accusations that natives were being exploited have periodically been made throughout the years. The Stoneys famously boycotted the 1950 Stampede following a rule change that cancelled a policy giving any Indigenous person free admittance upon showing their treaty card. The event that year was marred by violent thunderstorms, which led to apocryphal stories that the band had performed a rain dance in an effort to ruin the fair.

Despite the conflicts, the native communities around Calgary have been enthusiastic supporters of the Stampede and the Indian Village. The tipi owners have been long-term participants – many are third or fourth generation – and the Stampede has helped preserve and display First Nations cultures to the public. The village again relocated in 2016, doubled in size and featured a new exhibit displaying the partnership between the city, local First Nations and the Stampede.

During the 2018 Stampede, it was announced that the name of the area would be changed to reflect "reconciliation and increased understanding of Indigenous peoples as modern and strong and resilient"; after a voting process among the camps, it was announced on the final day of the Stampede that the Indian Village would be renamed "Elbow River Camp".

=== Employment and volunteerism ===
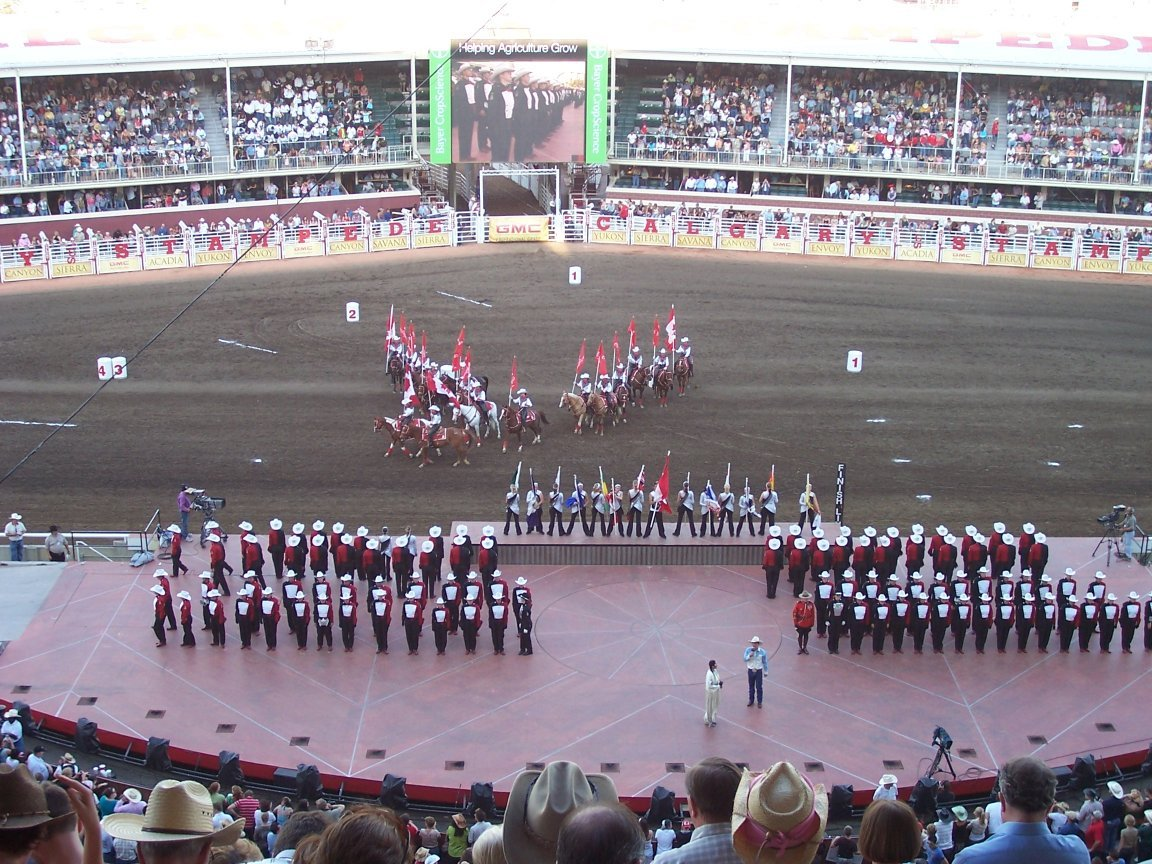
The Stampede Showband performs on stage

Operation of the park throughout the year requires 300 full-time and 1,400 part-time employees. An additional 3,500 seasonal workers are hired for the Stampede itself. The seasonal positions are often filled by Calgary's youth, and for many, represents their first paying jobs. The organization is maintained by a legion of volunteers, however. Over 2,000 volunteers sit on 50 committees responsible for all aspects of the Stampede's operation. Chief among them are the board of directors. The board is made up of 25 individuals; 20 elected from amongst the shareholders, three representing the city, one the province and the most recent president of the Stampede board. Nearly half of all volunteers have served for more than 10 years, and some as long as 60.

=== Young Canadians of the Calgary Stampede ===
When the Calgary Stampede brought in The Rockettes from New York City in 1964 as part of the grandstand show, they auditioned young local dancers to participate as the "Calgary Kidettes". The group was meant to be a one-time addition to the show, but proved popular with spectators, and returned for three subsequent years. By 1968, the Kidettes were renamed the Young Canadians of the Calgary Stampede and remained part of the nightly grandstand show, growing into a headline act by the 1970s. The group was modeled on the American group Up with People but with a style reflecting the pioneer culture of Alberta and Western Canada. The Young Canadians made television and live appearances throughout North America and attracted large crowds every year at the Calgary Stampede. In 1982, the Stampede Foundation set up the Young Canadians School of Performing Arts to offer professional training to singers and dancers between the ages of 7 and 19, paid for by scholarships from the Stampede organization. Two of the founders of the Young Canadians were director Randy Avery and choreographer Margot McDermott who remained with the group throughout the 1970s and 80s.

==== Sexual abuse class action lawsuit and settlement ====
In 2017, a class action lawsuit with over 70 class members was launched alleging that the Calgary Exhibition and Stampede Limited and the Calgary Stampede Foundation were negligent over their failure to alert police despite being aware of sexual abuse in The Young Canadians. In 2018, a staffer with The Young Canadians was criminally convicted and sentenced to 10 years in prison for sexually exploiting six members of the group between 1992 and 2014. In June 2023, the defendants reached a settlement in which they accepted liability and would pay all damages resulting from their negligence, with punitive damages to be determined later. In June 2024, the $9.5 million dollar settlement was approved by the Court of King's Bench of Alberta.

=== The Stampede Showband ===
The Stampede Showband was created in 1971 to serve as the organization's musical ambassadors. The troupe features over 150 members between the ages of 16 and 21, and has been named the world champion of marching show bands seven times, lastly being in July, 2023. The group has performed all over the world, in front of royalty and world leaders, and at the opening ceremonies of the 1988 Winter Olympics. In 2019, the Showband performed the national anthem at the 107th Grey Cup accompanied by Young Canadians singer, Lindsey Kelly. The Showband performs year round, and make over 100 appearances during the Stampede alone. They performed in the Tournament of Roses Parade in Pasadena, California for the third time in 2012 as part of the Stampede's 100th anniversary celebrations. The Showband also performed "O Canada" every night during the chuckwagon races with the member of the Young Canadians singing the anthem in English and French to represent both of Canada's official languages. During the chuckwagon races, the host introduces the showband as "Our very own, Calgary Stampede Showband". The Stampede Showriders were created in 1985 as a precision equestrian drill team and colour guard that accompanies the Showband.

=== Calgary Stampede Talent Search ===
The Calgary Stampede Talent Search was created in 1981 as an annual competition for amateur artists (aged 13 to 21). Junior performers (aged 6 to 12) were showcased every evening. The competition took place during the stampede and was intended to discover and develop talented young southern Albertans. It was phased out in 2020.

== Animal welfare ==
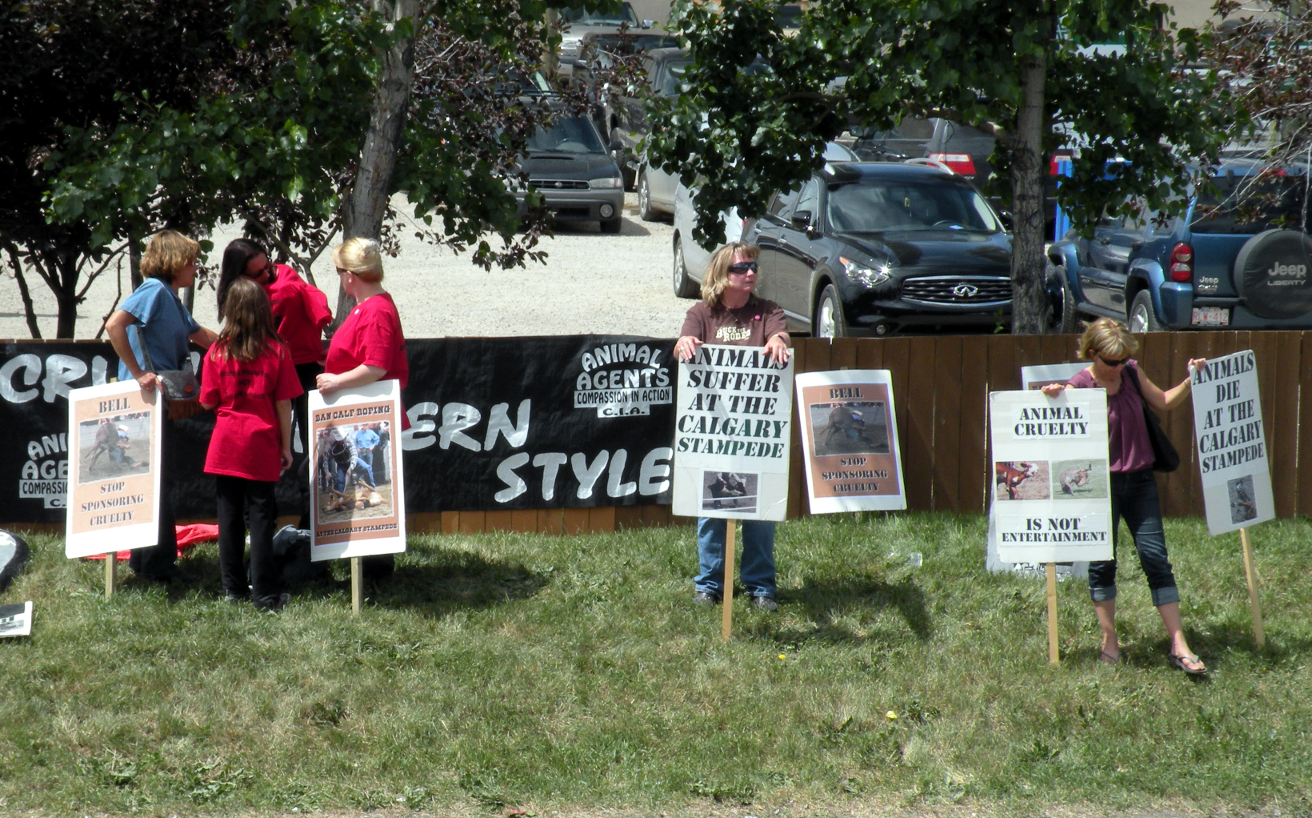
Anti-rodeo protesters picket outside an entrance to the Stampede grounds

The Stampede has attempted to balance rodeo tradition against the concerns of animal welfare groups who argue that the sport is inhumane. Officials defend the sport, calling the animals the "stars of the show" and stating that the Stampede is "passionate about the proper treatment of animals". The Calgary Humane Society has found itself at odds with other organizations by choosing to work with the Stampede to ensure that stress on the animals is kept to a minimum. It is one of two such groups, in addition to veterinarians, who are on hand to monitor the rodeo.

Chuckwagon racing is a particular source of controversy. The World Professional Chuckwagon Association has called the Stampede's Rangeland derby "a half-mile of hell", and 65 horses had been killed in the event from 1986 to 2015. Animal rights groups protest the event, arguing that the sport causes undue suffering for the horses. Racers admit the sport is dangerous, but defend their sport amidst the controversy, arguing that the animals are well cared for, and that allowing them to race saves many horses from prematurely going to slaughter.

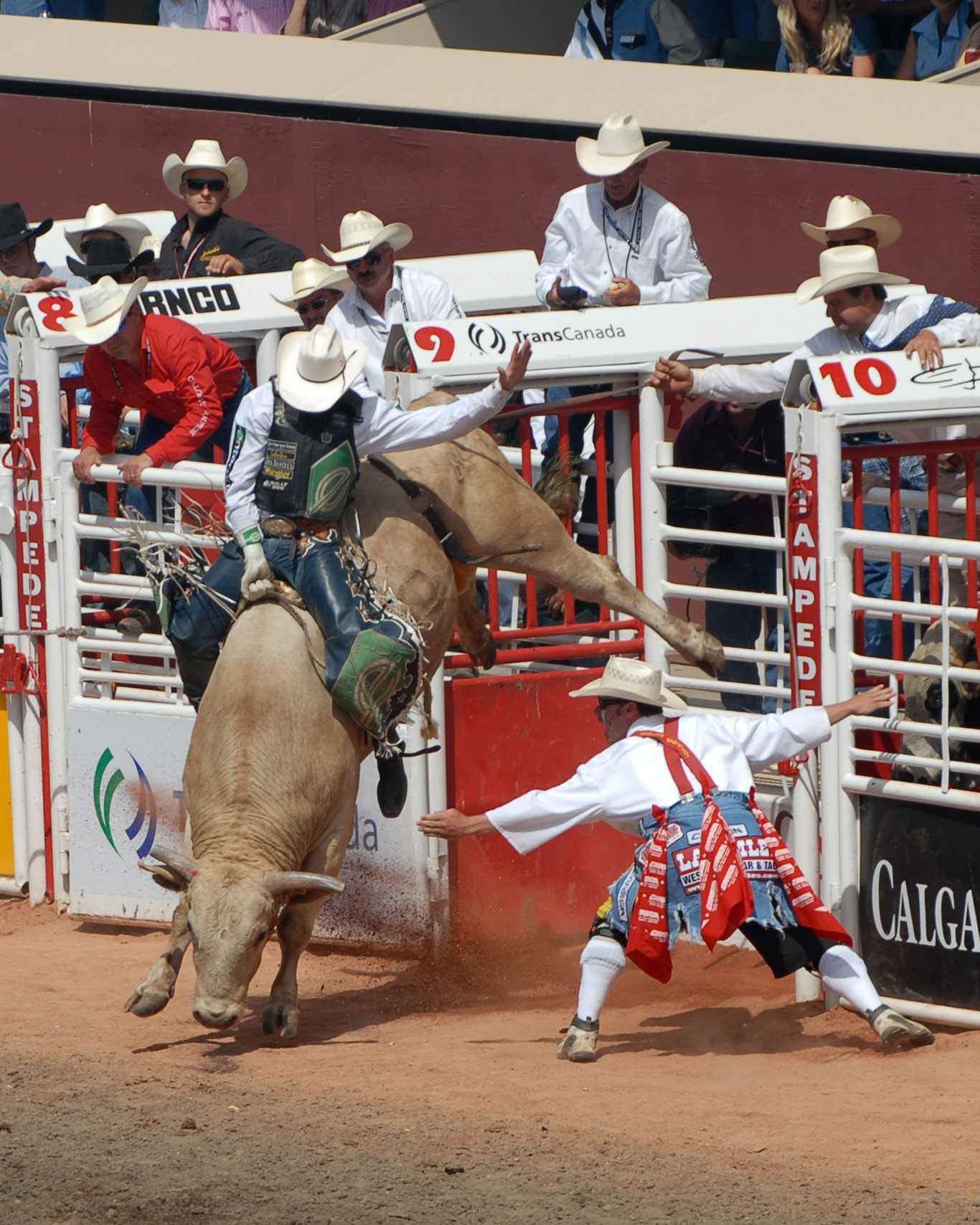
A bull rider in action; supporters of the rodeo argue the livestock is well cared for

Following a particularly deadly series of accidents in 1986 where nine horses were killed in chuckwagon racing incidents alone – including five horses in one spectacular crash – humane society officials, fans and even some drivers called for major changes to the races, while others called for the sport to be banned entirely. Numerous rule changes were announced prior to the 1987 event. The Calgary chapter of the Society for the Prevention of Cruelty to Animals accepted the changes, stating it would not call for the sport to be banned given that Stampede officials had moved to improve animal safety. Further changes to the rules were announced in 2011.

Tie down roping is a particular focus of efforts to eliminate the event. The Stampede altered its policies in 2010 to enforce the rules of the Canadian Professional Rodeo Association. Additionally, the Stampede was the first rodeo to introduce a no-time penalty for competitors who make a dangerous tackle in the steer wrestling event. Several more changes were made in 2011. The rule changes were announced after six animals died at the 2010 Stampede and were met with mixed reactions from both cowboys and animal welfare groups.

Such changes have not eliminated all risks; periodic accidents have continued to result in the deaths of horses and livestock. One of the deadliest incidents in Stampede history occurred in 2005 when, late in a trail ride meant to help celebrate the province's centennial, a group of about 200 horses became spooked and in the melee nine horses were killed after they were pushed off a city bridge into the Bow River. While similar trail rides had been completed without incident in the past, Stampede officials announced they would not attempt any further rides unless they could ensure the safety of the horses.

Animal welfare groups have called animal deaths "depressingly predictable" and seek a boycott of the rodeo. In the United Kingdom travel agencies have been asked to stop offering tourism packages to the Stampede, and in 2010, 92 members of the UK Parliament signed an Early Day Motion asking their Canadian counterparts to ban rodeo. Several groups petitioned the Duke and Duchess of Cambridge to cancel their planned attendance in 2011. However, the couple attended and participated in a private demonstration of rodeo and chuckwagon events.

=== Casualties ===
Year	Details	Reference
2025	1 horse euthanized after injury	
2024	3 horses, Chuckwagon race; 1 steer, steer wrestling	
2023	1 horse, Chuckwagon race	
2022	1 horse, Chuckwagon race	
2019	6 horses, Rangeland Derby chuckwagon race	
2018	1 horse	
2017	1 horse	
2016	no casualties	
2015	4 horses	
2014	1 horse Chuckwagon race; 1 steer, steer wrestling	
2010	6 horses, Rangeland Derby chuckwagon race	

== Broadcasting ==
Live coverage of the rodeo and Rangeland Derby competitions were broadcast by the CBC Sports website and Sportsnet One. CBC Television carried daily, late-night highlight shows, and coverage on the weekend. Supplemental coverage was, until 2013, seen on CBC's former sister cable network Bold. In 2019, U.S. sports channel CBS Sports Network aired nightly half-hour recaps covering the Stampede's rodeo (under the PBR Summer of Rodeo banner), while CBS broadcast a one-hour highlight show of the championship on July 21. In 2021, rodeo coverage moved to Sportsnet in Canada and The Cowboy Channel in the United States.

== Community ==
The festival spirit during Stampede extends throughout the city. Parade day serves as an unofficial holiday as many companies give employees half or full days off to attend. People of all walks of life, from executives to students, discard formal attire for casual western dress, typically represented by Wrangler jeans and cowboy hats. Many Calgarians have reduced productivity during the event because they take a relaxed attitude towards their usual workplace and personal responsibilities. However, the community and corporate events held during the Stampede create social networking opportunities and help newcomers acclimatize to the city. The Stampede is an important stop for political leaders as part of their annual summer tours of the country, sometimes called the barbecue circuit.

=== Pancake breakfasts ===
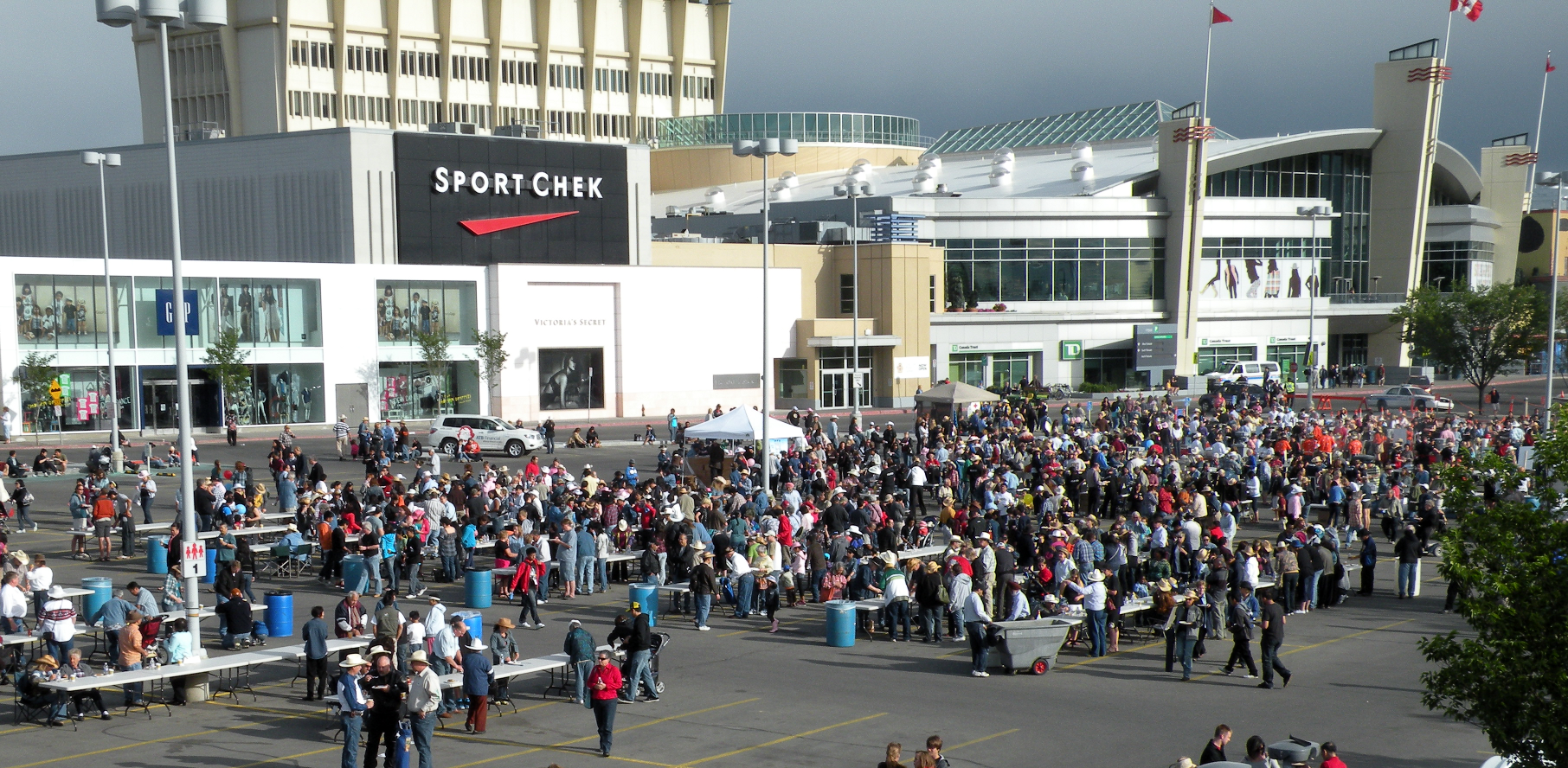
The Chinook Centre pancake breakfast serves more than 60,000 people each year.

The pancake breakfast is a local institution during Stampede. Dozens are held throughout the city each day, hosted by community groups, corporations, churches, politicians and the Stampede itself. The tradition of pancake breakfasts dates back to the 1923 Stampede when a chuckwagon driver by the name of Jack Morton invited passing citizens to join him for his morning meals.

The largest is the breakfast hosted at the Chinook Centre shopping mall. Four hundred volunteers are required to feed over 60,000 people who attend the one-day event that had its 50th anniversary in 2010. Other groups, such as the Calgary Stampede Caravan, feed as many as 120,000 people over ten days. The rising popularity of the barbecue grill in the 1960s and the city's population boom at the time brought with it the growth of community and company barbecues throughout the city during Stampede. Community booster groups have exported the tradition across the country as a symbol of Calgary's hospitality. Among them are the Calgary Grey Cup Committee, whose volunteers have hosted pancake breakfasts on the day of the Canadian Football League championship game for over three decades, sometimes in spite of poor weather conditions for the annual November contest.

=== Stampede parties ===
The size and number of parties each year during Stampede is viewed as an indicator of Calgary's economic strength. Corporations and community groups hold lavish events throughout the city for their staff and clients, while bars and pubs erect party tents, the largest of which draws up to 20,000 people per day. Paul Vickers, who owns several establishments in the city, estimates that he makes up to 20 percent of his annual revenue during the ten days of Stampede alone. Some parties have become known for heavy drinking and relaxed morals, so much so that one hotel's satirical ad promising to safely store a patron's wedding ring during Stampede was widely viewed as a legitimate offer. The parties are not without consequences, as lawyers have noted a significant increase in divorce filings in the weeks following the Stampede, primarily on claims of infidelity. Clinics see an increase in people seeking testing and treatment for sexually transmitted diseases, and Calgary is said to experience an annual baby boom each April; nine months after the event.

== Relationship with the city ==
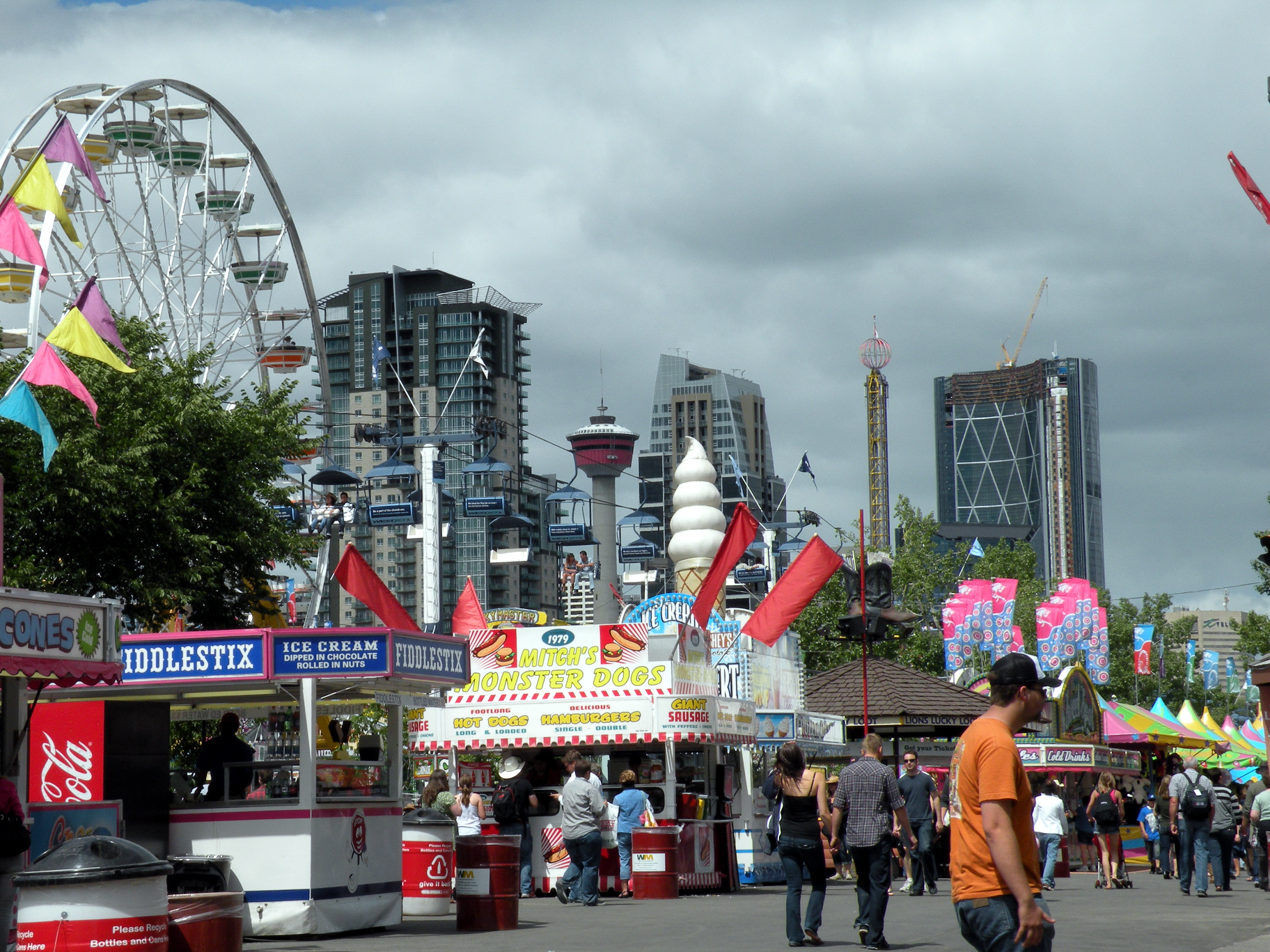
The midway with downtown and the Calgary Tower in the background

The Stampede has become inexorably linked to the city's identity. Calgary has long been called the "Stampede City", and carries the informal nickname of "Cowtown". The event's iconic status offers Calgary global publicity and plays a significant role in defining the city's image. Calgary's Canadian Football League team has been called the Stampeders since 1945, and it is a name shared by other teams in various sports throughout the city's history, including the Stampeders hockey team that operated in the years following World War II.

The Stampede has strong polling support within the province. A 2006 Ipsos-Reid poll found that 86 percent of Albertans felt that it raised the civic quality of life and considered it one of the region's most important cultural events. Nearly three in four stated they look forward to the annual event. However, critics argue that it is not a reflection of Alberta's frontier history, but represents a mythical impression of western cowboy culture created by 19th-century wild west shows.

Part of the event's success can be attributed to the close relationship the Stampede has often shared with both the civic government and community leaders. Mayors of Calgary and city aldermen have sat on the Stampede Board of Governors at the same time they occupied public office, and the Stampede's ability to convince wealthy and influential citizens to volunteer their time has allowed the organization to gain a high-profile within the city. The Stampede operates on city-owned land, pays no property tax on its lease, and typically faces little to no political interference from City Hall. It operates as a non-profit entity with all income reinvested into the park. All improvements to the park would revert to city control if the lease were allowed to expire.

Likewise, the Stampede has support from the media, which has been accused of providing an inordinate amount of positive coverage to the event while trivializing negative aspects. The local media faced national scrutiny in 2009 when both major newspapers refused to run anti-rodeo ads sponsored by the Vancouver Humane Society. While the Calgary Herald simply refused to run the ad, the Calgary Sun defended its position in an editorial. The Sun refuted charges it was kowtowing to the Stampede and justified its refusal by claiming "we are Calgarians and allowing a group of outsiders to come in and insult a proud Calgary tradition seemed just plain wrong." The Herald reversed its decision a year later, running a full-page ad sponsored by the Vancouver Humane Society.

=== Economic impact and tourism ===
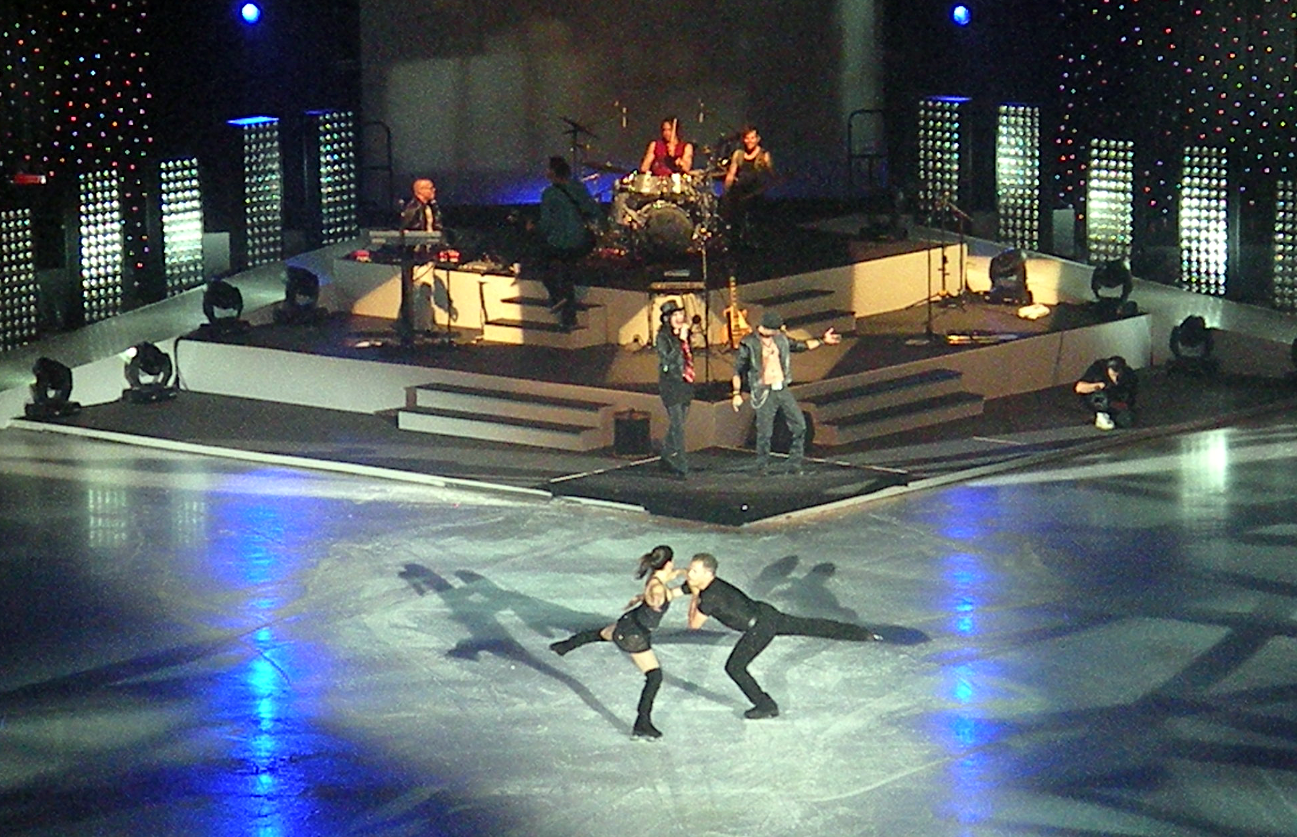
Jamie Salé and David Pelletier perform at the 2011 ice show in the Stampede Corral

While 70 percent of Stampede attendees are from the Calgary region, officials work to promote the event across the globe. As such, the Calgary Stampede is known around the world. The Stampede draws foreign visitors primarily from the United States, the United Kingdom and Australia, and is experiencing growing attendance by tourists from Asia and South America.

A 2019 Conference Board of Canada Report found the annual economic impact of the Calgary Stampede's year-round activities generated $540.8 million across the province of Alberta. The 10-day event accounted for $282.5 million of that amount. In Calgary alone, the year-round activities of the Stampede accounted for $449.8 million. Of that, 227.4 million was generated by the 10-day Stampede.

In 2025, Stampede organizers reported that the 10-day event was on pace to surpass the all-time attendance record set in 2024, with over 812,000 visitors counted by July 8 and a single-day attendance of 193,033 on TC Energy Community Day. The 2025 event was estimated to generate an economic impact of approximately $282 million, in line with the 2019 report.

Stampede officials estimated in 2009 that the city of Calgary had a gross economic impact of $172.4 million from the ten-day event alone, with a wider provincial total of $226.7 million. In terms of economic impact, the Stampede is the highest grossing festival in Canada, ahead of Ottawa's Winterlude, the Canadian National Exhibition in Toronto, and the Just for Laughs festival in Montreal. Additionally, Stampede officials estimate that for every dollar spent at Stampede Park, tourists spend $2.65 in the rest of the city. A poll conducted in 2011 found that 40 percent of Calgarians who intended to attend the Stampede expected to spend $150–$400 over the course of the event, and 7 percent stated that they would spend more than that.

=== Promoting Calgary ===
Civic leaders have consistently noted the Stampede's impact on the city. Mayor Andrew Davison claimed in 1944 that the event "had done more to advertise Calgary than any single agency", an opinion that has been echoed by his successors. Stampede officials have made similar claims, arguing that the event is one of Canada's most important tourist attractions. The Canadian Tourism Commission placed the event in its Signature Experiences Collection, one of six such events or locations in Alberta.

According to Ralph Klein, former mayor of Calgary and premier of Alberta, the Stampede symbolizes the province's spirit. He cited the friendly and welcoming attitude and festival spirit of the city's populace during the event, which community booster groups export around the world. Among examples cited was the infamous 1948 Grey Cup game in which two trains of Stampeder football fans descended on Toronto and launched an unprecedented series of celebrations before, during and after the game that included riding a horse into the lobby of the Royal York Hotel. The events helped turn the Grey Cup into a national festival and the largest single-day sporting event in the country.

== See also ==
- Calgary White Hat
- Canadian Finals Rodeo, Canada's other big rodeo
- Canadian Professional Rodeo Association
- Chuckwagon
- Festivals in Alberta
- Festival Western de Saint-Tite, eastern Canada's largest rodeo
- Raymond Stampede, Canada's oldest rodeo
- Reg Kesler
